= Maná discography =

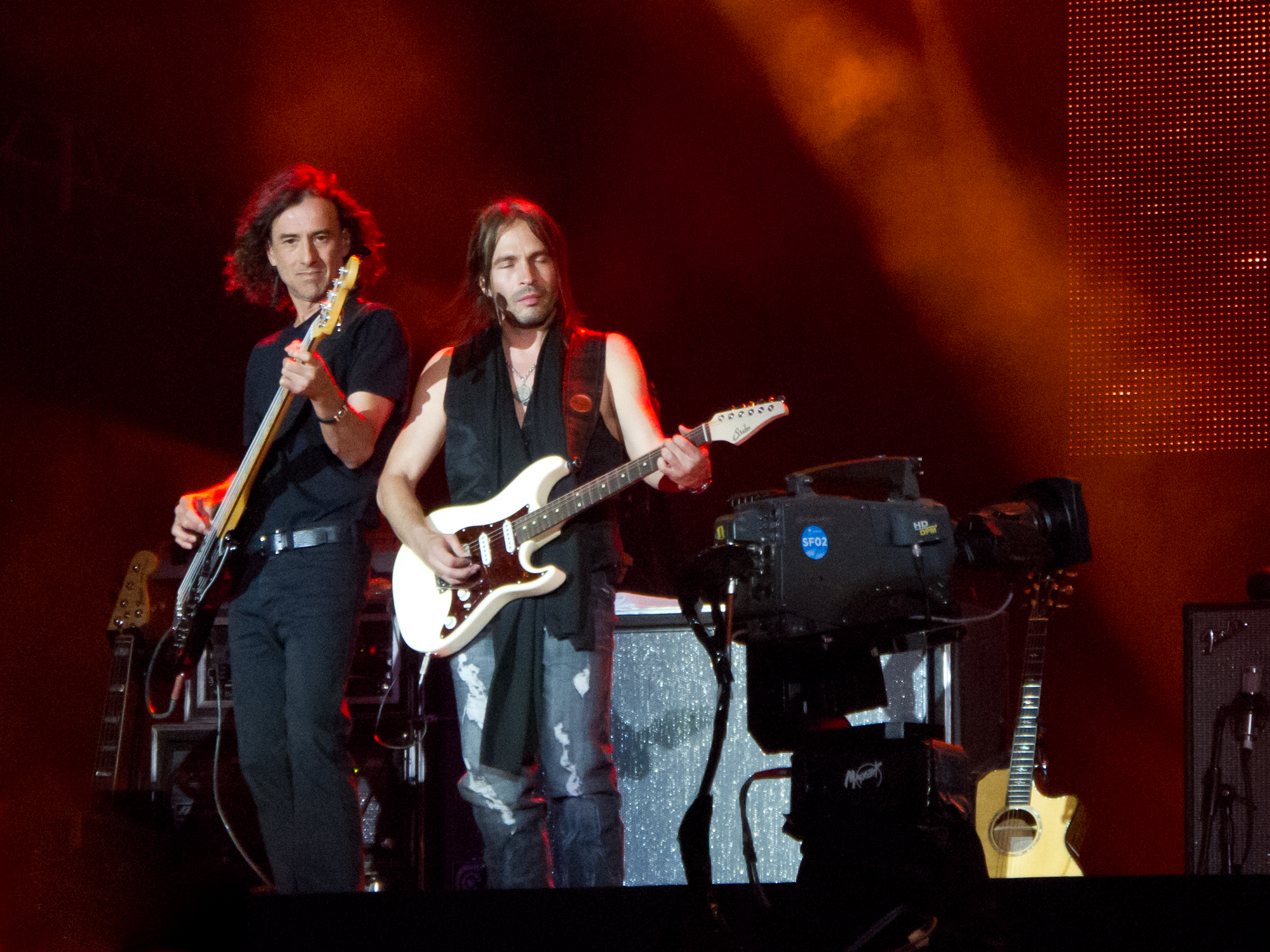
- Maná performing in 2012
- Studio albums: 9
- Soundtrack albums: 1
- Live albums: 4
- Compilation albums: 8
- Singles: 57
- Video albums: 5
- Music videos: 48
- Box set: 2

Mexican pop-rock band Maná has released 9 studio albums, 4 live albums, 8 compilation albums, 3 box sets, 1 soundtrack album, 1 remix album, 2 collaborative albums, 57 singles, 5 video albums and 48 music videos. Throughout their career, Maná has sold over 40 million albums worldwide, becoming the most successful Latin American band of all time. ¿Dónde Jugarán Los Niños? remains as the best-selling Spanish-language rock album in history with 10 million copies sold worldwide.

In a career spanning 35 years, they have achieved 50 No. 1 hits globally and became the first and only act to sell out 7 dates at the Los Angeles Forum as part of a single tour breaking previous records of 6 shows held by both Eagles and Kanye West. According to RIAA, they have achieved two Latin-Diamond albums: ¿Dónde Jugarán Los Niños? and Sueños Líquidos.

== Studio albums ==
=== As Sombrero Verde ===
Title	Album details
Sombrero Verde	Released: 1981; Label: Ariola, BMG
A Tiempo de Rock	Released: 1983; Label: Raff, Discos Cisné

=== As Maná ===
Title	Album details	Peak chart positions					Certifications
Title	Album details	MEX	SPA	US	US Latin	US Latin Pop	Certifications
Maná	Released: May 12, 1987; Label: A&M, Polygram	—	—	—	—	—	
Falta Amor	Released: July 2, 1990; Label: Warner Music	—	—	—	27	13	
¿Dónde Jugarán los Niños?	Released: October 27, 1992; Label: Warner Music	—	90	—	4	2	AMPROFON: 2× Diamond; PROMUSICAE: Platinum; RIAA: 12× Platinum (Latin)
Cuando los Ángeles Lloran	Released: April 25, 1995; Label: WEA Latina	—	—	— (Note: Cuando los Ángeles Lloran did not enter the Billboard 200, but peaked at number 22 on the Heatseekers Albums chart.)	6	2	AMPROFON: 2× Platinum+2× Gold; PROMUSICAE: Gold; RIAA: Gold
Sueños Líquidos	Released: October 14, 1997; Label: WEA Latina	—	18	67	1	1	AMPROFON: Diamond+2× Gold; PROMUSICAE: Platinum; RIAA: Platinum
Revolución de Amor	Released: August 20, 2002; Label: WEA Latina	—	1	22	1	1	AMPROFON: 3× Platinum+Gold; PROMUSICAE: 2× Platinum; RIAA: Gold
Amar Es Combatir	Released: August 22, 2006; Label: WEA Latina	8	1	4	1	1	AMPROFON: 2× Platinum; PROMUSICAE: 3× Platinum; RIAA: 16× Platinum (Latin)
Drama y Luz	Released: April 12, 2011; Label: WEA Latina	1	1	5	1	1	AMPROFON: Platinum+Gold; PROMUSICAE: Platinum; RIAA: 5× Platinum (Latin)
Cama Incendiada	Released: April 21, 2015; Label: WEA Latina	2	1	15	1	1	AMPROFON: Gold; PROMUSICAE: Gold; RIAA: Platinum (Latin)
"—" denotes a recording that did not chart or was not released in that territory.

== Special edition studio albums ==
Year	Album details
1994	¿Dónde Jugarán los Niños? (Special Edition): Released: February 15, 1994 – 1995; Label: WEA Latina; Format:
2005	Revolución de Amor: 2003 Tour Edition: Released: July 19, 2005 – 2006; Label: WEA Latina; Format:
2007	Amar Es Combatir (Deluxe Limited Edition): Released: March 27, 2007 – 2008; Label: WEA Latina; Format:
2011	Drama y Luz (Deluxe Edition): Released: November 15, 2011 – 2013; Label: WEA Latina; Format:

== Live albums ==
Title	Album details	Peak chart positions				Certifications
Title	Album details	SPA	US	US Latin	US Latin Pop	Certifications
Maná en Vivo	Released: December 13, 1994; Label: WEA Latina	—	—	7	4	
Maná MTV Unplugged	Released: June 22, 1999; Label: WEA Latina	2	83	1	1	AMPROFON: 6× Platinum; PROMUSICAE: 4× Platinum; RIAA: Gold
Unidos por la Paz	Released: 2001; Label: WEA Latina	—	—	—	—	
Arde el Cielo	Released: April 29, 2008; Label: WEA Latina	3	30	1	1	AMPROFON: Platinum+Gold; PROMUSICAE: Gold; RIAA: 2× Platinum (Latin)
"—" denotes a recording that did not chart or was not released in that territory.

== Compilations, imports, and greatest hits ==
Title	Album details	Peak chart positions				Certifications
Title	Album details	SPA	US	US Latin	US Latin Pop	Certifications
Todo Maná: Grandes Éxitos	Greatest Hits Album; Released: May 9, 1999; Label: WEA Latina	3	—	—	—	PROMUSICAE: 5× Platinum
Grandes	Released: November 20, 2001; Label: WEA Latina	52	—	—	—	PROMUSICAE: Gold
Sólo Para Fanáticos	Released: August 6, 2002; Label: Universal Music Latino	—	—	—	—	
Esenciales: Sol	Released: November 18, 2003; Label: WEA Latina	23	—	16	11	PROMUSICAE: Gold
Esenciales: Luna	Released: November 18, 2003; Label: WEA Latina	19	—	13	9	PROMUSICAE: Gold
Esenciales: Eclipse	Released: November 18, 2005; Label: WEA Latina	—	181	2	2	
Crónicas: Maná	Released: 2007; Label: Universal Music Latino	—	—	—	—	
Exiliados en la Bahía: Lo Mejor de Maná	Released: August 28, 2012; Label: WEA Latina	1	80	1	1	AMPROFON: Platinum
"—" denotes a recording that did not chart or was not released in that territory.

== Box sets ==
Year	Album details
2001	Lo Esencial de Maná: Released: November 20, 2001 – 2003; Label: WEA Latina; Format:
2001	100% Maná: Released: 2001; Label: WEA Latina; Format: 4×CD; Charts: SPA No. 11; Certifications: PROMUSICAE: Gold
2013	En Toda Libertad: Released: 2013–2014; Label: Format:

== Remix album ==
Information
Maná Remix
- Mexico only
- Released: 2002–2004
- Label: WEA Latina

== Collaborative albums ==
Information
Combinaciones Premiadas
- Featuring Los Enanitos Verdes
- Released: 2000–2001
- Label: Universal Music Latino
Noches de Cantina
- Featuring various artists
- Released: May 29, 2025
- Label: Warner Music Mexico
- Singles: "Rayando el Sol", "No Ha Parado de Llover", "Eres Mi Religión", "El Reloj Cucú", "Mariposa Traicionera", "Te Lloré un Río", "Amor Clandestino", "Ojalá Pudiera Borrarte" and "Vivir sin Aire".

== Singles ==
=== As Sombrero Verde ===
From Sombrero Verde (1981):

1. "Vampiro" (1981)
2. "Long Time" (1981)
3. "Profesor" (1981)
4. "Despiértate" (1982)
5. "Concierto" (1982)

From A Tiempo de Rock (1983):

1. "Laura" (1983)
2. "Hechos Nada Más" (1983)
3. "Me Voy al Mar" (1984)

=== As Maná ===
Single	Year	Peak chart positions				Certifications	Album
Single	Year	MEX	SPA	US	US Latin	Certifications	Album
"Rayando el Sol"	1990	—	—	—	—	RIAA: 8× Platinum (Latin)	Falta Amor
"Buscándola"	1990	—	—	—	—		Falta Amor
"Perdido en un Barco"	1991	—	—	—	—		Falta Amor
"Estoy Agotado"	1991	—	—	—	—		Falta Amor
"Oye Mi Amor"	1992	—	—	—	—	RIAA: 3× Diamond (Latin)	¿Dónde Jugarán los Niños?
"De Pies a Cabeza"	1992	—	—	—	—		¿Dónde Jugarán los Niños?
"Cómo Te Deseo"	1992	—	—	—	—		¿Dónde Jugarán los Niños?
"Te Lloré un Río"	1992	—	—	—	—	RIAA: 4× Platinum (Latin)	¿Dónde Jugarán los Niños?
"Me Vale"	1992	—	—	—	9		¿Dónde Jugarán los Niños?
"No Ha Parado de Llover"	1995	—	—	—	8		Cuando los Ángeles Lloran
"Hundido en un Rincón"	1995	—	—	—	12		Cuando los Ángeles Lloran
"El Reloj Cucú"	1996	—	—	—	34		Cuando los Ángeles Lloran
"Como un Perro Enloquecido"	1996	—	—	—	—		Cuando los Ángeles Lloran
"Clavado en un Bar"	1997	—	—	—	12	RIAA: 16× Platinum (Latin)	Sueños Líquidos
"Hechicera"	1997	—	—	—	36		Sueños Líquidos
"Cómo Dueles en los Labios"	1998	—	—	—	2		Sueños Líquidos
"En el Muelle de San Blas"	1998	—	—	—	18	RIAA: 16× Platinum (Latin)	Sueños Líquidos
"Cómo Te Extraño Corazón"	1998	—	—	—	31		Sueños Líquidos
"Se Me Olvidó Otra Vez"	1999	—	—	—	5		Maná MTV Unplugged
"Te Solté la Rienda"	1999	—	—	—	21		Maná MTV Unplugged
"Cachito"	2000	—	—	—	24		Maná MTV Unplugged
"Corazón Espinado" (with Santana)	2000	—	2	—	—		Supernatural
"Ángel de Amor"	2002	—	—	—	6		Revolución de Amor
"Eres Mi Religión"	2002	7	—	—	17	RIAA: 7× Platinum (Latin)	Revolución de Amor
"Mariposa Traicionera"	2003	1	—	— (Note: "Mariposa Traicionera" did not enter the Billboard Hot 100, but peaked at number twenty on the Bubbling Under Hot 100 chart.)	1	RIAA: 18× Platinum (Latin)	Revolución de Amor
"Justicia, Tierra y Libertad"	2003	—	—	—	—		Revolución de Amor
"Sábanas Frías" (featuring Rubén Blades)	2003	—	—	—	18		Revolución de Amor
"Te Llevaré al Cielo"	2003	—	—	—	7		Esenciales: Luna
"Baila Morena" (with Zucchero)	2006	—	—	—	—		Zu & Co.
"Labios Compartidos"	2006	—	—	82	1	AMPROFON: Diamond+4× Platinum; RIAA: 14× Platinum (Latin)	Amar Es Combatir
"Bendita Tu Luz" (featuring Juan Luis Guerra)	2006	—	—	— (Note: "Bendita Tu Luz" did not enter the Billboard Hot 100, but peaked at number two on the Bubbling Under Hot 100 chart.)	1	RIAA: Diamond (Latin)	Amar Es Combatir
"Manda una Señal"	2007	—	—	—	1		Amar Es Combatir
"Ojalá Pudiera Borrarte"	2007	—	—	— (Note: "Ojalá Pudiera Borrarte" did not enter the Billboard Hot 100, but peaked at number two on the Bubbling Under Hot 100 chart.)	2		Amar Es Combatir
"El Rey Tiburón"	2008	—	—	—	—		Amar Es Combatir
"Si No Te Hubieras Ido"	2008	—	32	— (Note: "Si No Te Hubieras Ido" did not enter the Billboard Hot 100, but peaked at number one on the Bubbling Under Hot 100 chart.)	1		Arde el Cielo
"Arde el Cielo"	2008	—	—	—	26		Arde el Cielo
"Lluvia al Corazón"	2011	2	12	— (Note: "Lluvia al Corazón" did not enter the Billboard Hot 100, but peaked at number seven on the Bubbling Under Hot 100 chart.)	1		Drama y Luz
"Amor Clandestino"	2011	1	32	— (Note: "Amor Clandestino" did not enter the Billboard Hot 100, but peaked at number 22 on the Bubbling Under Hot 100 chart.)	1	RIAA: 4× Platinum (Latin)	Drama y Luz
"El Verdadero Amor Perdona" (featuring Prince Royce)	2011	1	35	100	1	RIAA: 2× Platinum (Latin)	Drama y Luz
"Mi Reina del Dolor"	2012	1	—	—	37		Drama y Luz
"Hasta Que Te Conocí"	2012	3	48	—	1		Exiliados en la Bahía: Lo Mejor de Maná
"Penélope" (with Draco Rosa)	2012	—	—	—	—		Vida
"Mi Verdad" (featuring Shakira)	2015	5	20	— (Note: "Mi Verdad" did not enter the Billboard Hot 100, but peaked at number 19 on the Bubbling Under Hot 100 chart.)	1	AMPROFON: Gold; PROMUSICAE: 2× Platinum; RIAA: 5× Platinum (Latin)	Cama Incendiada
"La Prisión"	2015	18	—	—	27		Cama Incendiada
"Ironía"	2015	22	—	—	33		Cama Incendiada
"Adicto a Tu Amor"	2016	—	—	—	—		Cama Incendiada
"De Pies a Cabeza" (with Nicky Jam)	2016	23	36	—	8		non-album
"El Gladiador Mexicano"	2018	36	—	—	—		non-album
"Rayando el Sol" (featuring Pablo Alborán)	2019	7	—	—	—	RIAA: 2× Platinum (Latin)	Noches de Cantina
"No Ha Parado de Llover" (featuring Sebastian Yatra)	2019	13	—	—	—	RIAA: Platinum (Latin)	Noches de Cantina
"Eres Mi Religión" (featuring Joy Huerta)	2021	—	—	—	—		Noches de Cantina
"El Reloj Cucú" (featuring Mabel)	2021	—	—	—	—		Noches de Cantina
"Mariposa Traicionera" (featuring Alejandro Fernández)	2021	—	—	—	—	RIAA: 2× Platinum (Latin)	Noches de Cantina
"Te Lloré un Río" (featuring Christian Nodal)	2022	1	—	—	47	RIAA: Platinum (Latin)	Noches de Cantina
"Amor Clandestino" (featuring Edén Muñoz)	2023	—	—	—	—		Noches de Cantina
"Ojalá Pudiera Borrarte" (featuring Marco Antonio Solís)	2024	—	—	—	—		Noches de Cantina
"Vivir sin Aire" (featuring Carín León)	2025	—	—	—	—		Noches de Cantina
"—" denotes a recording that did not chart or was not released in that territory.

== Duets, collaborations, etc. ==
- 1995: "Celoso" (Single) from the My Family soundtrack album.
- 1999: In December 1998, they were invited by Carlos Santana for a duet single called "Corazón Espinado" for his Supernatural album. The track was composed by Fher Olvera. This gave them exposure in Europe, Asia, and the Middle East. They also appeared on the Grammy Award presentations and The Tonight Show with Jay Leno.
- 2001: "Si Ella Me Faltara Alguna Vez" (single) from Pablo Milanés from the Pablo Querido album that features Fher Olvera.
- 2001: Maná and Enanitos Verdes: Combinaciones Premiadas (album).
- 2002: "Cartas Marcadas" is a song from Shelia Rios from the Con toda el alma album that features Fher Olvera.
- 2002: "Mirarte", "Tic Tac", and "La Noche Me Gusta" are songs from Miguel Bosé from the Sereno album that features Alex González on drums.
- 2004: In 2003, Maná teamed up with Italian singer Zucchero, which resulted in two duets: a new version of Maná's "Eres mi Religión" and one of Zucchero's "Baila Morena" (single), both of which were released as singles and the latter of which reached the number one position in the French single charts in 2005. "Baila Morena" (single) from Zucchero is from his Zu & Co. album.
- 2004: Belén Arjona asked Maná's vocalist Fher Olvera to perform "Vivir sin Aire" for a duet for her album called O Te Mueves o Caducas (Edición Especial). It was the fifth and last single of her album.
- 2004: Maná and La Ley (band): Batalla de las Bandas: Superheros del Rock en Español! (album).
- 2006: On their seventh album, "Amar Es Combatir", features a Bachata song titled "Bendita Tu Luz", a duet along with Dominican Singer Juan Luis Guerra, who is widely regarded throughout Latin-America for his significant contribution to merengue and bachata styles of music.
- 2007: "No Lo Digo por Nada" is a song by Alejandro Sanz from his El Tren de los Momentos special edition album which features Alex González on drums.
- 2011: On their fourth special edition album Drama y Luz deluxe edition features with Latin pop/bachata singer/songwriter Prince Royce for Maná's third single "El Verdadero Amor Perdona" (Bachata Version)

== Videography ==
=== Video albums ===
- Maná: Éxitos en Video (1998)
- Maná MTV Unplugged (1999)
- Sueños Líquidos Videos (2002)
- Acceso Total (2004)
- Arde el Cielo (2008)

=== Music videos ===
Year	Title	Director	Album
1987	"Robot"	Unknown	Maná
1990	"Rayando el Sol"	Unknown	Falta Amor
1990	"Buscándola"	Unknown	Falta Amor
1991	"Perdido en un Barco"	Héctor Cárdenas	Falta Amor
1992	"Oye Mi Amor"	Hugo Massa	¿Dónde Jugarán los Niños?
1992	"Vivir sin Aire"	Gustavo Garzón	¿Dónde Jugarán los Niños?
1993	"Cómo Te Deseo"	Unknown	¿Dónde Jugarán los Niños?
1993	"Te Lloré un Río"	Gustavo Garzón	¿Dónde Jugarán los Niños?
1993	"Cómo Diablos"	Unknown	¿Dónde Jugarán los Niños?
1994	"Me Vale"	Unknown	¿Dónde Jugarán los Niños?
1995	"No Ha Parado de Llover"	Gustavo Garzón	Cuando los Ángeles Lloran
1995	"Hundido en un Rincón"	Juan Carlos Martín Méndez	Cuando los Ángeles Lloran
1996	"Déjame Entrar"	Gustavo Garzón	Cuando los Ángeles Lloran
1997	"Clavado en un Bar"	Jorge Aguilera	Sueños Líquidos
1997	"Hechicera"	Kiko Guerrero	Sueños Líquidos
1998	"Cómo Dueles en los Labios"	Kiko Guerrero	Sueños Líquidos
1998	"En el Muelle de San Blas"	Kiko Guerrero	Sueños Líquidos
1998	"Un Lobo por Tu Amor"	Unknown	Sueños Líquidos
2002	"Ángel de Amor"	Unknown	Revolución de Amor
2002	"Eres Mi Religión"	Unknown	Revolución de Amor
2003	"Mariposa Traicionera"	Eduardo Flemmer and Pablo Flemmer	Revolución de Amor
2003	"Te Llevaré al Cielo"	Unknown	Esenciales: Luna
2006	"Labios Compartidos"	Pablo Croce and Felipe Niño	Amar Es Combatir
2006	"Bendita Tu Luz" (featuring Juan Luis Guerra)	Israel Lugo and Gabriel Coss	Amar Es Combatir
2007	"Manda una Señal"	Wayne Isham	Amar Es Combatir
2007	"Ojalá Pudiera Borrarte"	Joaquín Cambre	Amar Es Combatir
2008	"El Rey Tiburón"	Pablo Croce	Amar Es Combatir
2008	"Si No Te Hubieras Ido"	Pablo Croce	Arde el Cielo
2008	"Arde el Cielo"	Dago González and Tim Zimmer	Arde el Cielo
2011	"Lluvia al Corazón"	Sam Stephens and Ariel Danziger	Drama y Luz
2011	"Amor Clandestino"	Pablo Croce	Drama y Luz
2011	"El Verdadero Amor Perdona"	Pablo Croce	Drama y Luz
2011	"El Verdadero Amor Perdona" (featuring Prince Royce)	Pablo Croce	Drama y Luz
2012	"Mi Reina del Dolor"	Joaquín Cambre	Drama y Luz
2012	"Hasta Que Te Conocí"	Pablo Croce	Exiliados en la Bahía: Lo Mejor de Maná
2015	"Mi Verdad" (featuring Shakira)	Jaume de Laiguana	Cama Incendiada
2015	"La Prisión"	Unknown	Cama Incendiada
2015	"Ironía"	Unknown	Cama Incendiada
2016	"Adicto a Tu Amor"	Unknown	Cama Incendiada
2016	"De Pies a Cabeza" (with Nicky Jam)	Unknown	non-album
2018	"El Gladiador Mexicano"	Unknown	non-album
2019	"Rayando el Sol" (featuring Pablo Alborán)	Unknown	Noches de Cantina
2019	"No Ha Parado de Llover" (featuring Sebastián Yatra)	Unknown	Noches de Cantina
2021	"Eres Mi Religión" (featuring Joy Huerta)	Andrés Ibáñez Díaz Infante	Noches de Cantina
2021	"El Reloj Cucú" (featuring Mabel)	Mr. Pico	Noches de Cantina
2021	"Mariposa Traicionera" (featuring Alejandro Fernández)	Andrés Ibáñez Díaz Infante	Noches de Cantina
2021	"Te Lloré un Río" (featuring Christian Nodal)	Antonio Roma	Noches de Cantina
2025	"Vivir sin Aire" (featuring Carín León)	Antonio Roma	Noches de Cantina

=== Collaborations in music videos ===
Year	Title	Other performer	Director	Album
1999	"Corazón Espinado"	Santana	Adolfo Doring	Supernatural
2004	"Vivir sin Aire" (only Fher Olvera)	Belén Arjona	Unknown	O Te Mueves o Caducas (Edición Especial)
