= Exiliados en la Bahía: Lo Mejor de Maná =

Greatest hits album by Maná
- Released: August 28, 2012
- Genre: Latin; Pop rock Alternative rock
- Length: 2:32:58
- Label: Warner Music Mexico
- Producer: Fher Olvera; Alex González

Maná chronology
Drama y Luz (2011)	Exiliados en la Bahía: Lo Mejor de Maná (2012)	Cama Incendiada (2015)

Singles from Exiliados en la Bahía: Lo Mejor de Maná
- 1. "Hasta Que Te Conocí" Released: June 25, 2012; 2. "Un Nuevo Amanecer" Released: August 27, 2012

Exiliados en la Bahía: Lo Mejor de Maná (Exiles at the Bay: The Best of Maná) is a greatest hits compilation album, released on August 28, 2012, by the Mexican Latin pop/Rock en Español band Maná.

The compilation features the single "Hasta Que Te Conocí", an adaptation of the song by Juan Gabriel released on June 25, a new song, "Un Nuevo Amanecer", two live songs from the Drama y Luz album, and a compilations of singles from 1990-2012. Exiliados en la Bahía: Lo Mejor de Maná won for Rock/Alternative Album of the Year at the Premio Lo Nuestro 2013.

The album received an exclusive version for Brazil, renamed Você é Minha Religião: O Melhor do Maná (You Are My Religion: The Best of Maná). This version received both Standard and Deluxe editions and has a shorter tracklist, with 14 tracks for the Standard Edition and 18 for the Deluxe. The major difference between this and the original version of the compilation is that some tracks are exclusive re-recordings from popular Maná tracks with brazilian artists (Thiaguinho, Luan Santana, Jorge & Mateus and Jota Quest respectively) as guests.

== Track listing ==
Disc 1
No.	Title	Writer(s)	From album	Length
1.	"Hasta Que Te Conocí (Until I Met You)"	Juan Gabriel	Exiliados en la Bahía: Lo Mejor de Maná	4:56
2.	"Lluvia al Corazón (Rain to the Heart)"	Sergio Vallin, Fher Olvera	Drama y Luz	4:08
3.	"Amor Clandestino (Illegal Love)"	Fher Olvera	Drama y Luz	4:51
4.	"El Verdadero Amor Perdona (True Love Forgives)"	Fher Olvera	Drama y Luz	4:41
5.	"Mi Reina del Dolor (My Queen of Pain)"	Sergio Vallin, Fher Olvera	Drama y Luz	4:06
6.	"Arde el Cielo (The Sky Burns)"	Fher Olvera	Arde el Cielo	4:33
7.	"Si No Te Hubieras Ido (If You Hadn't Gone)"	Marco Antonio Solís	Arde el Cielo	4:30
8.	"El Rey Tiburón (The Shark King)"	Fher Olvera	Amar es Combatir	4:53
9.	"Bendita Tu Luz (Blessed Is Your Light) (ft. Juan Luis Guerra)"	Sergio Vallin, Fher Olvera	Amar es Combatir	4:23
10.	"Ojalá Pudiera Borrarte (I Wish I Could Erase You)"	Fher Olvera	Amar es Combatir	4:56
11.	"Labios Compartidos (Shared Lips)"	Fher Olvera	Amar es Combatir	5:17
12.	"Manda Una Señal (Send Me a Sign)"	Fher Olvera	Amar es Combatir	4:41
13.	"Ángel de Amor (Angel of Love)"	Fher Olvera, Alex González	Revolución de Amor	4:55
14.	"Eres Mi Religión (You're My Religion)"	Fher Olvera	Revolución de Amor	5:28
15.	"Mariposa Traicionera (Treacherous Butterfly)"	Fher Olvera	Revolución de Amor	4:24
16.	"Corazón Espinado (Pierced Heart) (ft. Santana)"	Fher Olvera	Supernatural	4:36

Disc 2
No.	Title	Writer(s)	From album	Length
1.	"Un Nuevo Amanecer (A New Dawn)"	Fher Olvera	Exiliados en la Bahía: Lo Mejor de Maná	5:09
2.	"Clavado En Un Bar (Stuck In a Bar)"	Fher Olvera	Sueños Líquidos	5:11
3.	"Hechicera (Sorceress)"	Fher Olvera, Alex González	Sueños Líquidos	4:51
4.	"En el Muelle de San Blas (On the Wharf of San Blas)"	Fher Olvera, Alex González	Sueños Líquidos	5:53
5.	"No Ha Parado de Llover (It Hasn't Stopped Raining)"	Fher Olvera, Alex González	Cuando los Ángeles Lloran	5:22
6.	"Cuando los Ángeles Lloran (When the Angels Cry)"	Fher Olvera	Cuando los Ángeles Lloran	5:07
7.	"Déjame Entrar (Let Me In)"	Fher Olvera	Cuando los Ángeles Lloran	4:21
8.	"Oye Mi Amor (Listen, My Love)"	Fher Olvera, Alex González	¿Dónde Jugarán los Niños?	4:31
9.	"Me Vale (I Don't Care)"	Alex González	¿Dónde Jugarán los Niños?	4:32
10.	"Cómo Te Deseo (How I Desire You)"	Fher Olvera	¿Dónde Jugarán los Niños?	4:31
11.	"Vivir Sin Aire (To Live Without Air)"	Fher Olvera	¿Dónde Jugarán los Niños?	4:52
12.	"Te Lloré Un Río (I Cried You a River)"	Fher Olvera	¿Dónde Jugarán los Niños?	4:53
13.	"Rayando el Sol (The Sun Is Shining)"	Fher Olvera, Alex González	Falta Amor	4:11
14.	"Perdido En Un Barco (Lost On a Boat)"	Fher Olvera, Alex González	Falta Amor	4:13
15.	"Lluvia al Corazón (Rain to the Heart - Live from Buenos Aires, Argentina 2011)"	Sergio Vallín, Fher Olvera	Drama y Luz	4:35
16.	"El Verdadero Amor Perdona (True Love Forgives - Live from Buenos Aires, Argentina 2011)"	Fher Olvera	Drama y Luz	5:01

Note: The tracks on Disc 2 are digitally remastered (except tracks 1 and 6).

== Personnel ==
- Fher Olvera – main vocals, acoustic & electric guitar, coros, programming,
- Alex González – drums, vocals, coros, programming, keyboards
- Sergio Vallín – acoustic & electric guitars, coros, orchestral arrangements, string arrangements, keyboards, programming
- Juan Diego Calleros – bass

== Charts ==
=== Weekly charts ===
Chart (2012)	Peak position
Spanish Albums (Promusicae)	1
Swiss Albums (Schweizer Hitparade)	56
US Billboard 200	80
US Top Latin Albums (Billboard)	1
US Latin Pop Albums (Billboard)	1

=== Year-end charts ===
Chart (2012)	Position
Spanish Albums (PROMUSICAE)	45
US Top Latin Albums (Billboard)	26
Chart (2013)	Position
US Top Latin Albums (Billboard)	8
Chart (2017)	Position
US Top Latin Albums (Billboard)	39
Chart (2018)	Position
US Top Latin Albums (Billboard)	50
Chart (2019)	Position
US Top Latin Albums (Billboard)	45
Chart (2020)	Position
US Top Latin Albums (Billboard)	80
Chart (2021)	Position
US Top Latin Albums (Billboard)	52

== Singles ==
Year	Song
2012	"Hasta Que Te Conocí"

== Certifications ==
Region	Certification	Certified units/sales
Mexico (AMPROFON)	Platinum	60,000^{^}
^{^} Shipments figures based on certification alone.
