= 100% Maná =

Box set by Maná
- Released: August 26, 2001
- Genre: Latin/Rock en Español
- Label: WEA Latina

Maná chronology
Unidos Por La Paz (2001)	100% Maná (2001)	Lo Esencial de Maná (2001)

100% Maná is a 2001 four CD boxset compilation album by Latin American Mexican rock band Maná. This compilation was produced with the objective of entering the Spain and European markets. Includes 47 songs with hits like "Rayando El Sol", "Oye Mi Amor", "¿Donde Jugaran Los Niños?", "No Ha Parado De Llover", and "Como Te Extraño Corazón".

== Track listing ==
=== Disc 1 (Falta Amor) ===
#	Title	
1.	Gitana	4:17
2.	Refrigerador	3:50
3.	Rayando El Sol	4:14
4.	Buscandola	4:09
5.	Soledad	4:38
6.	Falta Amor (featuring Alex Lora)	4:15
7.	Estoy Agotado	3:54
8.	Perdido En Un Barco	4:15
9.	La Puerta Azul	3:14
10.	Maeo	3:58
11.	No Me Mires Asi	4:15

=== Disc 2 (¿Dónde Jugarán Los Niños?) ===
#	Title	
1.	De Pies A Cabeza	4:39
2.	Oye Mi Amor	4:33
3.	Cachito	4:49
4.	Vivir Sin Aire	4:52
5.	¿Donde Jugaran Los Niños?	4:16
6.	El Desierto	4:10
7.	La Chula	4:09
8.	Como Te Deseo	4:32
9.	Te Lloré Un Rio	4:55
10.	Como Diablos	3:55
11.	Huele A Tristeza	4:46
12.	Me Vale	4:32

=== Disc 3 (Cuando los Ángeles Lloran) ===
#	Title	
1.	Como Un Perro Enloquecido	4:24
2.	Selva Negra	5:44
3.	Hundido En Un Rincón	5:58
4.	El Reloj Cucú	5:02
5.	Mis Ojos	4:54
6.	Ana	4:56
7.	Siembra El Amor	5:13
8.	Cuando los Ángeles Lloran	5:07
9.	Déjame Entrar	4:23
10.	No Ha Parado De Llover	5:23
11.	Antifaz	5:00
12.	El Borracho	4:44

=== Disc 4 (Sueños Líquidos) ===
#	Title	
1.	Hechicera	4:59
2.	Un Lobo Por Tu Amor	5:20
3.	Como Dueles En Los Labios	4:08
4.	Chamán	5:12
5.	Tu Tienes Lo Que Quiero	4:39
6.	Clavado En Un Bar	5:12
7.	Róbame El Alma	4:03
8.	En El Muelle De San Blás	4:53
9.	La Sirena	5:29
10.	Me Voy A Convertir En Un Ave	5:01
11.	Como Te Extraño Corazón	5:10
12.	Ámame Hasta Que Me Muera	5:27

== Certifications ==
Region	Certification	Certified units/sales
Spain (Promusicae)	Gold	50,000^{^}
^{^} Shipments figures based on certification alone.
