= Lo Esencial de Maná =

Box set by Maná
- Released: November 20, 2001
- Genre: Latin/Rock en Español
- Label: WEA Latina

Maná chronology
100% Maná (2001)	Lo Esencial de Maná (2001)	Grandes (2001)

Lo Essential de Maná is a three CD box set of the first three studio albums under recording label WEA Latina from Mexican rock band Maná. Since they burst on the scene from Guadalajara, Mexico, in the early 1990s, Maná have reigned as the premier Latin rock band of our time. Led by the powerful and passionate vocalist-composer Fher Olvera, drummer Alex González, guitarist Sergio Vallín, and bassist Juan Diego Calleros blend American power rock with Hispanic folk idioms and Afro-Caribbean rhythms. This three-CD box set compilation contains the band's greatest hits, from their début album, Falta Amor to their third album Cuando Los Ángeles Lloran. A total of 37 songs from their favorites appear, including "Vivir Sin Aire," "Dónde Jugarán los Niños?", and the reggae-tinged "Selva Negra." Other favorites, such as "La Chula" and "Como Te Deseo," are remixed as pop-dance numbers.

== Albums ==
=== Disc 1 (Falta Amor) ===
#	Title	Time
1.	Gitana	4:17
2.	Refrigerador	3:50
3.	Rayando El Sol	4:14
4.	Buscandola	4:09
5.	Soledad	4:38
6.	Falta Amor (featuring Alejandro Lora)	4:15
7.	Estoy Agotado	3:54
8.	Perdido En Un Barco	4:15
9.	La Puerta Azul	3:14
10.	Maeo	3:58
11.	No Me Mires Asi	4:15

=== Disc 2 (¿Dónde Jugarán Los Niños? Special Edition) ===
#	Title	Time
1.	De Pies A Cabeza	4:39
2.	Oye Mi Amor	4:33
3.	Cachito	4:49
4.	Vivir Sin Aire	4:52
5.	¿Donde Jugaran Los Niños?	4:16
6.	El Desierto	4:10
7.	La Chula	4:09
8.	Como Te Deseo	4:32
9.	Te Lloré Un Rio	4:55
10.	Como Diablos	3:55
11.	Huele A Tristeza	4:46
12.	Me Vale	4:32
13.	Como Te Deseo (Remix Version)	4:48
14.	La Chula (Remix Version)	5:54

=== Disc 3 (Cuando los Ángeles Lloran) ===
#	Title	Time
1.	Como Un Perro Enloquecido	4:24
2.	Selva Negra	5:44
3.	Hundido En Un Rincón	5:58
4.	El Reloj Cucú	5:02
5.	Mis Ojos	4:54
6.	Ana	4:56
7.	Siempre El Amor	5:13
8.	Cuando Los Ángeles Lloran	5:07
9.	Déjame Entrar	4:23
10.	No Ha Parado De Llover	5:23
11.	Antifaz	5:00
12.	El Borracho	4:44
