= Todo Maná: Grandes Éxitos =

Todo Maná: Grandes Exitos

Greatest hits album by Maná
- Released: May 9, 1999
- Recorded: 1990–1997
- Genre: Latin/rock en español
- Length: 68:18
- Label: WEA Latina

Maná chronology
MTV Unplugged (1999)	Todo Maná: Grandes Exitos (1999)	Unidos Por La Paz (2001)

Todo Maná: Grandes Exitos is a compilation album (eleventh overall) set by Latin American Mexican rock band Maná. This compilation was made in effort to promote to fans in Spain.

== Track listing ==
#	Title	Time
1.	En El Muelle De San Blás (Fher Olvera, Alex González)	5:51
2.	Vivir Sin Aire (Fher Olvera)	4:51
3.	Oye Mi Amor (Fher Olvera, Alex González)	4:32
4.	Te Lloré Un Rio (Fher Olvera)	4:52
5.	Cómo Te Deseo (Fher Olvera)	4:30
6.	Clavado En Un Bar (Fher Olvera)	5:11
7.	No Ha Parado De Llover (Fher Olvera, Alex González)	5:21
8.	Déjame Entrar (Fher Olvera)	4:20
9.	Cuando los Ángeles Lloran (Fher Olvera)	5:05
10.	De Pies a Cabeza (Fher Olvera, Alex González)	4:35
11.	Perdido En Un Barco (Fher Olvera, Alex González)	4:12
12.	Rayando El Sol (Fher Olvera, Alex González)	4:10
13.	Hechicera (Fher Olvera, Alex González)	4:58
14.	Un Lobo Por Tu Amor (Fher Olvera, Alex González)	5:21

== Certifications ==
Region	Certification	Certified units/sales
Spain (Promusicae)	5× Platinum	500,000^{^}
^{^} Shipments figures based on certification alone.
