= Esenciales: Luna =

Compilation album by Maná
- Released: November 18, 2003
- Genre: Latin/Rock en Español
- Label: WEA Latina

Maná chronology
Esenciales: Sol (2003)	Esenciales: Luna (2003)	Esenciales: Eclipse (2003)

Singles from Esenciales: Luna
- 1. "Te Llevaré Al Cielo"; 2. "Celoso"

Esenciales: Luna is one of three CD compilation albums by Latin American Mexican rock band Maná. This album is a collection of their greatest hits along with Eclipse and Sol. Maná's Esenciales: Luna includes an unreleased song, Te Llevaré Al Cielo, and a bonus track "Celoso" from the movie soundtrack album "My Family (Mi Familia)". Their music videos for the songs En el Muelle de San Blas and Vivir Sin Aire (live) are included in the CD.

== Track listing ==
#	Title	Time
1.	Rayando El Sol	4:10
2.	Cachito	4:45
3.	Vivir Sin Aire	4:53
4.	Te Lloré Un Río	4:54
5.	Huele A Tristeza	4:49
6.	No Ha Parado De Llover	5:21
7.	El Reloj Cucú	5:02
8.	Hundido En Un Rincón	5:58
9.	Mis Ojos	4:54
10.	Celoso - Jealous Heart w.m. by J. Carson	2:51
11.	En El Muelle De San Blás	5:53
12.	Como Dueles En Los Labios	4:08
13.	Como Te Extraño Corazón	5:11
14.	Te Llevaré Al Cielo	4:46

== Chart performance ==
Chart (2003)	Peak position
US Latin Pop Albums (Billboard)	13
US Top Latin Albums (Billboard)	9

== Singles ==
Year	Single	Chart	Position
2003	Te Llevaré Al Cielo	Billboard Hot Latin Tracks 100	7

== Certifications ==
Region	Certification	Certified units/sales
Argentina (CAPIF)	Gold	20,000^{^}
Spain (PROMUSICAE)	Gold	50,000^{^}
^{^} Shipments figures based on certification alone.
