= Unidos Por La Paz =

Live album by Maná
- Released: 2001
- Recorded: March 3, 2001
- Venue: Estadio Azteca (Mexico City)
- Genre: Latin/Rock en Español
- Label: WEA Latina

Maná chronology
Todo Maná: Grandes Éxitos (1999)	Unidos Por La Paz (2001)	100% Maná (2001)

Unidos Por La Paz is a live 2 disc album (twelfth overall) set by Latin American Mexican rock band Maná. In the biggest show ever performed by 2 Latin artists in Mexico City's Estadio Azteca (Azteca Stadium), 104,000 people came together on March 3, 2001 for the "Unidos Por La Paz" (United for Peace), a concert performed by Maná and Jaguares to benefit the people of the Mexican state of Chiapas. Both bands have been well known for being rivals in the early 1990s. The four-hour extravaganza opened with a dance performance of over 200 children. It was televised to over 20 countries, including Mexican broadcasters Televisa and TV Azteca.

== Track listing ==
=== Disc 1 ===
#	Title	Time
1.	Oye Mi Amor	5:19
2.	Hechicera	5:30
3.	Falta Amor	4:43
4.	Cuando los Ángeles Lloran	7:16
5.	Selva Negra	5:07
6.	Desapariciones	6:39
7.	Como Te Deseo	6:35
8.	Déjame Entrar	5:15

=== Disc 2 ===
#	Title	Time
1.	Ana	5:27
2.	¿Dónde Jugarán Los Niños?	4:47
3.	Te Lloré Un Rio/Vivir Sin Aire	7:02
4.	Rayando El Sol	5:53
5.	En El Muelle De San Blás	6:17
6.	Clavado En Un Bar	7:44
7.	La Negra Tomasa	3:57
8.	Give Peace a Chance	7:27
