= Esenciales: Sol =

Compilation album by Maná
- Released: November 18, 2003
- Genre: Latin/Rock en Español
- Label: WEA Latina

Maná chronology
| Revolución de Amor (2002) | Esenciales: Sol (2003) | Esenciales: Luna (2003) |

Singles from Esenciales: Sol
- 1. "Te Llevaré Al Cielo"; 2. "Sabanas Frias (featuring Ruben Blades)"

Esenciales: Sol is a CD compilation album (seventeenth overall) by the Latin American Mexican rock band Maná. It is one of three greatest hits compilation albums, along with Esenciales: Eclipse and Esenciales: Luna, with remastered versions of all their best-known songs. Esenciales: Sol includes a previously unreleased song, "Te Llevaré Al Cielo", and a bonus track, "Tonto En La Lluvia'" (in English:"Fool in the Rain"), a song by Led Zeppelin from their In Through the Out Door album. The album also includes two music videos.

== Track listing ==
| # | Title | |
|---|---|---|
| 1. | Te Llevaré Al Cielo | 4:46 |
| 2. | Estoy Agotado | 3:52 |
| 3. | Buscándola | 4:05 |
| 4. | Perdido En Un Barco | 4:13 |
| 5. | De Pies A Cabeza | 4:36 |
| 6. | Oye Mi Amor | 4:31 |
| 7. | Sábanas Frías featuring Rubén Blades | 5:19 |
| 8. | Como Te Deseo | 4:29 |
| 9. | Me Vale | 4:31 |
| 10. | Déjame Entrar | 4:23 |
| 11. | Tonto En La Lluvia | 6:12 |
| 12. | Clavado En Un Bar | 5:12 |
| 13. | Hechicera | 4:59 |
| 14. | Ángel de Amor | 4:57 |

== Chart performance ==
| Chart (2003) | Peak position |
|---|---|
| US Latin Pop Albums (Billboard) | 16 |
| US Top Latin Albums (Billboard) | 11 |

In 2006, the album peaked at #31 in Spain.

== Singles ==
| Year | Single | Chart | Position |
|---|---|---|---|
| 2003 | Te Llevaré Al Cielo | Billboard Hot Latin Tracks 100 | 7 |

== Certifications ==
| Region | Certification | Certified units/sales |
|---|---|---|
| Argentina (CAPIF) | Gold | 20,000^{^} |
| Spain (Promusicae) | Gold | 50,000^{^} |
^{^} Shipments figures based on certification alone.

== Music videos ==
1. Oye Mi Amor
2. Ángel De Amor
