= Esenciales: Eclipse =

Compilation album by Maná
- Released: November 18, 2003
- Genre: Rock en Español
- Length: 70:16
- Label: WEA Latina

Maná chronology
Esenciales: Luna (2003)	Esenciales: Eclipse (2003)	Amar es Combatir (2006)

Singles from Esenciales: Eclipse
- 1. "Te Llevaré Al Cielo"

Esenciales: Eclipse is one of three CD set compilation albums (nineteenth overall) set by Latin American Mexican rock band Maná. This compilation includes their greatest hits, combining songs from Sol and Luna (hence the name "Eclipse") and adding Eres Mi Religión which is not included in either Sol or Luna. Maná's Esenciales: Eclipse includes songs such as Vivir Sin Aire, Oye Mi Amor, Cómo Te Deseo, En El Muelle de San Blas and an unreleased song, Te Llevaré Al Cielo. It also includes a song they made with salsa music singer Rubén Blades, Sábanas Frías. There is also the music video for Eres Mi Religión that is included in the CD.

== Track listing ==
#	Title	Time
1.	Te Llevaré Al Cielo	4:48
2.	Rayando El Sol	4:10
3.	Perdido En Un Barco	4:13
4.	Oye Mi Amor	4:22
5.	Vivir Sin Aire	4:53
6.	Te Lloré Un Río	4:54
7.	Cómo Te Deseo	4:31
8.	No Ha Parado De Llover	5:23
9.	Hundido En Un Rincón	5:59
10.	Clavado En Un Bar	5:12
11.	Hechicera	5:00
12.	En El Muelle De San Blás	5:53
13.	Sábanas Frías (featuring Rubén Blades)	5:20
14.	Eres Mi Religión	5:27

== Chart performance ==
Chart (2003)	Peak position
US Billboard 200	181
US Latin Pop Albums (Billboard)	2
US Top Latin Albums (Billboard)	2

== Singles ==
Year	Single	Chart	Position
2003	Te Llevaré Al Cielo	Billboard Hot Latin Tracks 100	7

== Music video ==
1. Eres Mi Religión
