= Grandes =

Grandes may refer to:

- Agustín Muñoz Grandes, Spanish general and politician
- Banksia ser. Grandes, a series of plant species native to Australia
- Grandes y San Martín, a municipality located in the province of Ávila, Castile and León, Spain
- Grandes (islands), a group of three small islands in the Aegean Sea off the east coast of Crete
- Grandes (album), by Maná
