= Benny Faccone =

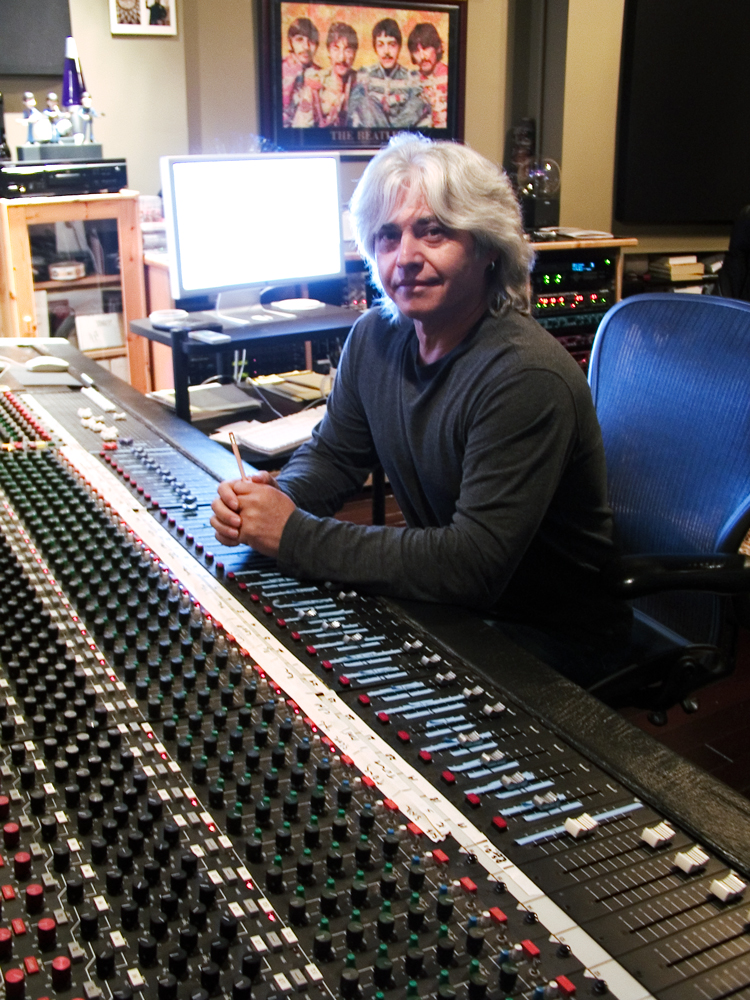

Background information
- Born: Italy
- Genres: Pop; Latin Pop; Latin Rock
- Occupations: Mixing engineer; recording engineer; record producer

Benny Faccone is a recording engineer, mixing engineer, and record producer known for his work with Ricky Martin, Santana, Luis Miguel, Maná and Marco Antonio Solís. He has won 5 Grammy Awards and 12 Latin Grammy Awards.

== Biography ==
Faccone was born in Italy and was raised in Canada. He received a composition degree from the Berklee College of Music. After graduation, he began working in the recording industry in Montreal and later moved to Los Angeles in 1980, where he became engineer at A&M Records. While mixing for the band Menudo, Faccone met Draco Rosa, member of the Puerto Rican boy band and with whom he continued working for the next decades. In 1986, Faccone became a freelance engineer.

Faccone owns "The Cavern" studios in Thousand Oaks, California. He named the studio after The Cavern Club in Liverpool, where The Beatles played during their early career. He is also a professor at the California Lutheran University.

== Selected discography ==
Year	Album	Artist	Role
1984	Closer to the Source	Dizzy Gillespie	Engineer
1985	The Broadway Album	Barbra Streisand	Engineer, Assistant engineer
1987	Soy Como Quiero Ser	Luis Miguel	Engineer
1987	Soy Así	José José	Engineer
1988	Busca Una Mujer	Luis Miguel	Engineer
1988	...Nada como el sol	Sting	Mixer
1990	20 Años	Luis Miguel	Engineer
1991	Romance	Luis Miguel	Engineer, mixer
1991	Lo Que Son Las Cosas	Ednita Nazario	Mixer
1992	En Vivo	Luis Enrique	Mixer
1992	El León	Los Fabulosos Cadillacs	Engineer
1992	¿Dónde Jugarán Los Niños?	Maná	Engineer
1993	Vasos Vacíos	Los Fabulosos Cadillacs	Engineer, mixer
1993	Me Amarás	Ricky Martin	Engineer, mixer
1993	Encadenado	Mijares	Mixer
1993	Aries	Luis Miguel	Engineer, mixer
1994	Pasiones	Ednita Nazario	Engineer, mixer
1994	Navidad en el Trópico	Disney	Engineer, mixer
1995	Fina Estampa Ao Vivo	Caetano Veloso	Engineer, mixer
1995	A Medio Vivir	Ricky Martin	Engineer, mixer
1996	Vivencias	Ana Gabriel	Engineer
1996	Si El Norte Fuera El Sur	Ricardo Arjona	Engineer, mixer
1996	Espíritu Libre	Ednita Nazario	Engineer, mixer
1997	Sueños Líquidos	Maná	Engineer, mixer, producer
1998	Vuelve	Ricky Martin	Engineer, mixer
1998	Esperanto	Kabah	Mixer
1998	35 Aniversario, Vol. 5	José José	Engineer
1999	MTV Unplugged	Maná	Engineer, mixer
1999	Supernatural	Santana	Engineer, mixer
1999	Ricky Martin	Ricky Martin	Engineer
2000	Sound Loaded	Ricky Martin	Mixer
2000	Secreto de Amor	Joan Sebastian	Mixer
2000	Noche de Cuatro Lunas	Julio Iglesias	Engineer
2001	Más de Mi Alma	Marco Antonio Solís	Engineer
2001	Duetos Armando Manzanero	Armando Manzanero	Mixer
2002	Santo Pecado	Ricardo Arjona	Engineer
2002	Revolución de Amor	Maná	Engineer, mixer
2002	Lo Dijo el Corazón	Joan Sebastian	Engineer, mixer
2003	Libertad	La Ley	Engineer
2003	En Vivo	Ricardo Arjona	Engineer, mixer
2003	Día de Independencia [Bonus Tracks]	Rojo	Mixer
2004	Razón de Sobra	Marco Antonio Solís	Engineer, mixer
2004	Con la London Metropolitan Orchestra, Vol. 2	Ricardo Montaner	Engineer, mixer
2004	Acceso Total	Maná	Engineer, mixer
2005	Mis Boleros Favoritos	Luis Miguel	Engineer, mixer
2005	Adentro	Ricardo Arjona	Engineer, mixer
2006	Todo Cambió	Camila	Engineer
2006	Trozos de Mi Alma, Vol. 2	Marco Antonio Solís	Engineer, mixer
2007	Quién Dijo Ayer	Ricardo Arjona	Engineer, mixer
2007	Esta Es Mi Vida	Jesse & Joy	Mixer
2007	Con el Corazón en la Mano	Rojo	Mixer
2007	Ultimate Santana	Santana	Engineer, mixer
2008	Una Noche en Madrid: En Vivo	Marco Antonio Solís	Engineer, mixer
2008	Manzanero Big Band Jazz de México	Manzanero Big Band Jazz de México, Armando Manzanero	Mixer
2008	Arde el Cielo	Maná	Engineer, mixer
2009	Ni Antes Ni Después	Manzanero Big Band Jazz de México, Armando Manzanero	Mixer
2009	Amor Vincit Omnia	Draco Rosa	Mixer, producer
2010	En Total Plenitud	Marco Antonio Solís	Mixer
2011	Drama y Luz	Maná	Engineer, mixer
2012	Una Noche de Luna	Marco Antonio Solís	Engineer, mixer
2012	Exiliados en la Bahia: Lo Mejor de Maná	Maná	Engineer, mixer
2013	Vida	Draco Rosa	Engineer, mixer
2013	Gracias Por Estar Aquí	Marco Antonio Solís	Engineer, mixer
2014	Sex and Love	Enrique Iglesias	Engineer
2015	Por Amor a Morelia Michoacán	Marco Antonio Solís	Engineer, mixer
2015	Los Dúo	Juan Gabriel	Mixer
2016	Glory	Britney Spears	Assistant Engineer
2017	Jesse & Joy	Jesse & Joy	Mixer
2018	Monte Sagrado	Draco Rosa	Mixer

== Awards and recognition ==
=== Grammy Awards ===
Faccone has been nominated for the following Grammy Awards:

Year	Title	Artist	Category	Role	Result
2000	Supernatural	Santana	Album of the Year	Engineer, mixer	Won
2003	Revolución De Amor	Maná	Best Latin Rock/Alternative Album	Engineer, mixer	Won
2003	Lo Dijo El Corazón	Joan Sebastian	Best Mexican/Mexican-American Album	Engineer, mixer	Won
2010	Amor Vincit Omnia	Draco Rosa	Best Latin Rock, Alternative or Urban Album	Mixer, producer	Nominated
2012	Drama y Luz	Maná	Best Latin Pop, Rock, or Urban Album	Engineer, mixer	Won
2014	Vida	Draco Rosa	Best Latin Pop Album	Engineer, mixer	Won
2015	Gracias Por Estar Aquí	Marco Antonio Solís	Best Latin Pop Album	Engineer, mixer	Nominated
2023	Qué Ganas de Verte	Marco Antonio Solís	Best Regional Mexican Music Album (Including Tejano)	Engineer, mixer	Nominated

=== Latin Grammy Awards ===
Faccone has been nominated for the following Latin Grammy Awards:

Year	Title	Artist	Category	Role	Result
2000	Corazón Espinado	Santana ft. Maná	Record of the Year	Engineer, mixer	Won
2001	Duetos	Armando Manzanero	Best Pop Album by a Duo/Group with Vocals	Engineer, mixer	Won
2002	Lo Dijo El Corazón	Joan Sebastian	Best Grupero Album	Engineer, mixer	Won
2003	Revolución De Amor	Maná	Best Engineered Album	Engineer, mixer	Won
2003	Revolución De Amor	Maná	Best Rock Album By a Duo or Group With Vocal	Engineer, mixer	Won
2007	Con el Corazón en la Mano	Rojo	Best Christian Album (Spanish Language)	Mixer	Nominated
2007	-	-	Producer of the Year	Producer	Nominated
2009	Teatro	Draco Rosa	Best Rock Album	Mixer	Won
2010	Mientes	Camila	Record of the Year	Engineer	Won
2010	Dejarte de Amar	Camila	Best Pop Album By A Duo Or Group With Vocal	Engineer	Won
2011	Drama y Luz	Maná	Best Engineered Album	Engineer	Won
2011	Drama y Luz	Maná	Best Rock Performance By a Duo or Group with Vocal	Mixer	Won
2012	Hasta Que Te Conocí	Maná	Record of the Year	Engineer, mixer	Nominated
2013	Vida	Draco Rosa	Album of the Year	Engineer, mixer	Won
2013	Vida	Draco Rosa	Best Contemporary Pop Vocal Album	Engineer, mixer	Nominated
2013	Más y Más	Draco Rosa ft. Ricky Martin	Record of the Year	Engineer, mixer	Nominated
2014	Gracias Por Estar Aquí	Marco Antonio Solís	Best Traditional Pop Vocal Album	Engineer, mixer	Nominated
2019	Monte Sagrado	Draco Rosa	Best Rock Album	Mixer	Won
2022	Qué Ganas De Verte (Deluxe)	Marco Antonio Solís	Best Ranchero/Mariachi Album	Engineer, mixer	Nominated
