= Arde el Cielo =

Live album by Maná

Arde El Cielo

Live album with studio tracks by Maná
- Released: April 29, 2008
- Recorded: at José Miguel Agrelot Coliseum, San Juan, Puerto Rico and Henson Studios & Puerta Azul Studio
- Genre: Latin Pop/Rock
- Length: 79:12
- Label: WEA Latina
- Producer: Fher Olvera, Alex González

Maná chronology
Amar es Combatir (2006)	Arde El Cielo (2008)	Drama y Luz (2011)

Singles from Arde El Cielo
- 1. "Si No Te Hubieras Ido"; 2. "Arde el Cielo"

Arde el Cielo (English: The Sky Burns) is the third live album by the Mexican Latin Pop/Rock band Maná. The album was released on April 29, 2008. This live album was released in three formats CD, CD with DVD, and DVD.

The album was recorded during their Amar es Combatir Tour in two of four shows in San Juan, Puerto Rico at José Miguel Agrelot Coliseum on March 30 and 31, 2007. The first single off the album, "Si No Te Hubieras Ido," was released on March 12, 2008, and quickly became number one on the Hot Latin Tracks.

Maná also recorded 2 studio songs "Arde El Cielo" and "Si No Te Hubieras Ido". This album is the successor to the popular album Amar es Combatir (2006).

== Track listing ==
=== CD track listing ===
Original track listing
No.	Title	Writer(s)	Length
1.	"Déjame Entrar"	Fher Olvera	4:28
2.	"Manda Una Señal"	F. Olvera	5:27
3.	"Labios Compartidos"	F. Olvera	6:02
4.	"Bendita Tu Luz"	F. Olvera, Sergio Vallín	4:20
5.	"Vivir Sin Aire"	F. Olvera	5:31
6.	"¿Dónde Jugarán los Niños?"	F. Olvera, Alex Gonzáles	6:01
7.	"Mariposa Traicionera"	F. Olvera	4:31
8.	"El Rey"	José Alfredo Jiménez	5:08
9.	"No Ha Parado De Llover"	F. Olvera, A. González	9:07
10.	"En El Muelle De San Blás"	F. Olvera, A. González	6:16
11.	"Clavado En Un Bar"	F. Olvera	7:00
12.	"Rayando el Sol"	F. Olvera, A. González	6:23
13.	"Si No Te Hubieras Ido"	Marco Antonio Solís	4:31
14.	"Arde el Cielo"	F. Olvera	4:34

=== CD/DVD Edition ===
Original track listing
No.	Title	Length
1.	"Déjame Entrar"	5:08
2.	"Manda Una Señal"	5:22
3.	"Labios Compartidos"	5:58
4.	"Bendita Tu Luz"	4:46
5.	"Vivir Sin Aire"	5:28
6.	"¿Dónde Jugarán los Niños?"	5:43
7.	"Mariposa Traicionera"	4:41
8.	"El Rey"	5:36
9.	"No Ha Parado de Llover"	9:05
10.	"En el Muelle de San Blas"	5:51
11.	"Rayando el Sol"	6:19
12.	"Clavado En Un Bar"	7:16
13.	"Final y Créditos"	1:31

== Music DVD (cover only) ==
Arde el Cielo was released in DVD format as well. With the same tracks as the CD/DVD combo edition, this version has two added bonus features, the "Si No Te Hubieras Ido" music video and the Arde El Cielo Electronic Press Kit.

=== Music DVD Edition ===
Arde El Cielo

Video by Maná
- Released: 2008
- Recorded: 2007
- Genre: Rock en Español, Latin Pop
- Label: WEA Latina

Maná chronology
Acceso Total (2004)	Arde El Cielo (2008)

Original track listing
No.	Title	Length
1.	"DVD Intro"	1:30
2.	"Déjame Entrar"	5:11
3.	"Manda Una Señal"	5:20
4.	"Labios Compartidos"	6:01
5.	"Bendita Tu Luz"	5:24
6.	"Vivir Sin Aire"	5:29
7.	"¿Dónde Jugarán los Niños?"	6:22
8.	"Mariposa Traicionera"	5:21
9.	"El Rey"	5:42
10.	"No Ha Parado de Llover"	9:00
11.	"En el Muelle de San Blas"	6:32
12.	"Rayando el Sol"	6:59
13.	"Clavado En Un Bar"	8:51
14.	"Si No Te Hubieras Ido"	4:38
15.	"Arde El Cielo (EPK)"	4:47

=== The concert ===
Fher Olvera changes the lyrics of the song "En el Muelle de San Blas" from San Blas, a Mexican seaside tourist destination, to "San Juan" in order to acknowledge his Puerto Rican audience.

During the last song of the concert, Olvera unfurls a special double flag. It begins with the Mexican flag, then becomes the Puerto Rican flag, to the cheers of the audience.

== Personnel ==
- Fher Olvera – main vocals, acoustic & electric guitars, harmonics, and group member
- Alex González – drums, coros and group member
- Sergio Vallín – acoustic & electric guitars and group member
- Juan Diego Calleros – bass and group member

== Additional personnel ==
- Juan Carlos Toribio – keyboards
- Fernando Vallín – backup guitar, coros
- Hector Quintana – percussions, coros

== Charts ==
Arde El Cielo debuted at #30 on the Billboard 200 chart with 17,000 copies sold; it also debuted at #11 on the Billboard Top Rock Albums chart. The disc has been certified double platinum in the US for 400,000 copies as well as gold and platinum in Mexico and Spain for over 120,000 and 40,000 units sold respectively.

=== Album ===
Chart (2008)	Peak position
U.S. Billboard Top Latin Albums	1
U.S. Billboard Top Latin Pop Albums	1
U.S. Billboard Top Rock Albums	10
U.S. Billboard 200	30
U.S. Billboard Top Music Video	2
Venezuelan Albums (Recordland)	5

=== Singles ===
Year	Song	Chart	Peak position
2008	"Si No Te Hubieras Ido"	U.S. Billboard Hot Latin Tracks	1
2008	"Si No Te Hubieras Ido"	U.S. Billboard Latin Pop Airplay	1
2008	"Si No Te Hubieras Ido"	U.S. Billboard Latin Tropical Airplay	8
2008	"Si No Te Hubieras Ido"	U.S. Billboard Spain	7
2008	"Si No Te Hubieras Ido"	Venezuela Singles Chart	8
2008	"Arde el Cielo"	U.S. Billboard Hot Latin Tracks	26
2008	"Arde el Cielo"	U.S. Billboard Latin Pop Airplay	14
2008	"Arde el Cielo"	Venezuela Singles Chart	6

== Sales and certifications ==
Region	Certification	Certified units/sales
Argentina (CAPIF)	Platinum	40,000^{^}
Mexico (AMPROFON)	Platinum+Gold	120,000^{^}
Spain (PROMUSICAE)	Gold	40,000^{^}
United States (RIAA)	2× Platinum (Latin)	200,000^{^}
^{^} Shipments figures based on certification alone.
