= Cómo Dueles en los Labios =

Single by Maná

"Como Dueles En Los Labios"

Single by Maná

from the album Sueños Líquidos
- Released: 1997
- Studio: A&M Studios; Hollywood, California; Puerta Azul-Mobile Studio; Quinta Del Mar, Puerto Vallarta
- Genre: Acoustic; nueva trova
- Length: 4:08
- Label: WEA Mexico
- Songwriter: Fher Olvera
- Producers: Fher Olvera; Alex González; Benny Faccone

Maná singles chronology
"Hechicera" (1997)	"Como Dueles En Los Labios" (1997)	"En El Muelle De San Blás" (1998)

Music video
- "Como dueles en los labios" on YouTube

"Cómo Dueles en los Labios" (English: "How Your Lips Hurt") is a song from Mexican band Maná's fifth studio album Sueños Líquidos (1997). The song was written by the band's frontman Fher Olvera, who handled production alongside Alex González and Benny Faccone. It was released as the fourth single from the album in 1997. An acoustic ballad with a Cuban nueva trova influence, its lyrics deal with the singer who feels empty and is kept happy with memories. The song received positive reactions from four music journalists although one review found it to be a copy of Silvio Rodríguez's music. Commercially, the song peaked at number two on the pop ballads chart in Mexico and Hot Latin Songs chart in the United States, while also topping the Latin Pop Airplay chart in the United States. A music video for the song was directed by Kiko Guerrero. The song was included on the set list for the promotional tour of the album.

== Background and composition ==
In 1997, Maná released their fifth studio album Sueños Líquidos, with the band's lead vocalist Fher Olvera composing most of the tracks and co-producing the record with drummer Alex González and Benny Faccone. Recording for the took place at the A&M Studio in Hollywood, California and thePuerta Azul-Mobile Studio in Puerto Vallarta, Mexico One of the songs Olvera wrote for Sueños Líquidos was "Cómo Dueles en los Labios". A "gentle" acoustic ballad with Cuban nueva trova influences featuring a flautist from Puerto Vallarta. the song describes "the pain of emptiness where small of moments of happiness are now the only companions". Gonzalez explained: "It's a ballad, but it has these Peter Gabriel drum machines in the background. But it has melody and orchestra string music."

== Promotion and reception ==
"Cómo Dueles en los Labios" was released as the fourth single from the album in 1997 by WEA Mexico. Its music video was directed by Kiko Guerrero. The video features black-and-white scenes of Olvera and a woman separately on a couch in a white sheet. The song was later included on their compilation album Esenciales: Luna (2003). It was on the set list for the promotional tour of the album. The video was listed on "Maná's Music Video Evolution" by Billboard which an editor commented: "Who said rock was just about having fun? Mana showed that other feelings – like spite – are also important." Achy Obejas of the Chicago Tribune praised it as "simply beautiful". Mischa Field wrote for the Brattleboro Reformer that the track when combined flute, "the sweet stuff is positively on fire". The Miami Herald critic Leila Cobo called it a "gem of a song set to a simple, rising guitar accompaniment", while Ramilo Burr of the Fort Worth Star-Telegram referred to it as a "lovely, acoustic song". El Norte editor Deborah Davis was less impressed as she felt the record lacked inspirations and claimed that Maná was copying Silvio Rodríguez's music on "Cómo Dueles en los Labios".

Commercially, the track reached number two on the pop ballads chart in Mexico and on the Billboard Hot Latin Songs chart in the US. It topped the Latin Pop Airplay chart in the US where it spent a single week on this position.

== Charts ==
Chart performance for "Cómo Dueles en los Labios"
Chart (1998)	Peak position
Mexico ballad/pop (Notimex)	2
US Hot Latin Songs (Billboard)	2
US Latin Pop Airplay (Billboard)	1

== See also ==
- List of Billboard Latin Pop Airplay number ones of 1998
