= Grandes (album) =

Greatest hits album (Import) by Maná
- Released: November 20, 2001
- Genre: Latin/Rock en Español
- Label: WEA Latina

Maná chronology
Lo Esencial de Maná (2001)	Grandes (2001)	Sólo Para Fanáticos (2002)

Grandes is compilation album released by Latin American Mexican rock band Maná. They released this greatest hits album for distribution in Italy.

== Track listing ==
1. En el muelle de San Blas - 5:34
2. Vivir Sin Aire - 4:54
3. Oye Mi Amor - 4:36
4. Te Lloré Un Río - 4:55
5. Como Te Deseo - 4:34
6. Clavado En Un Bar - 5:15
7. No Ha Parado de Llover - 5:26
8. Déjame Entrar - 4:26
9. Cuando los Ángeles Lloran - 5:08
10. De Pies a Cabeza - 4:40
11. Perdido En Un Barco - 4:16
12. Rayando el Sol - 4:16
13. Hechicera - 5:05
14. Un Lobo Por Tu Amor - 5:24
15. Corazón Espinado - 4:38

== Certifications ==
Region	Certification	Certified units/sales
Italy (FIMI)	Gold	50,000^{*}
^{*} Sales figures based on certification alone.
