= MTV Unplugged (Maná album) =

1999 live album

Maná MTV Unplugged

Live album by Maná
- Released: June 22, 1999
- Recorded: March 9, 1999
- Venue: Miami
- Genre: Rock en español
- Length: 72:58
- Label: WEA Latina
- Producers: Fher Olvera, Alex González

Maná chronology
Sueños Líquidos (1997)	Maná MTV Unplugged (1999)	Todo Grandes Exitos (1999)

Maná tour chronology
Líquido Tour (1998)	Unplugged U.S. Tour (1999)	Revolución de Amor Tour (2002–2003)

Maná MTV Unplugged is a live album by Mexican rock band Maná. It was an acoustic set performed for MTV Unplugged in Miami on March 9, 1999, and released on CD and DVD on June 22, 1999. It includes exclusive re-make versions of the José Alfredo Jiménez song "Te Solte La Rienda", the Rubén Blades song "Desapariciones", and "Se Me Olvidó Otra Vez" by Juan Gabriel. As of 2000, it sold 2 millions of copies.

It received a nomination for a Grammy Award for Best Latin Pop Album.

== Track listing ==
No.	Title	Writer(s)	Length
1.	"No Ha Parado de Llover"	Fher Olvera, Alex González	6:40
2.	"En el Muelle de San Blás"	Fher Olvera, Alex González	7:01
3.	"Vivir Sin Aire"	Fher Olvera, Alex González	5:43
4.	"Cuando los ángeles lloran"	Fher Olvera	7:06
5.	"Cachito"	Fher Olvera, Alex González	5:19
6.	"Te Solté La Rienda"	José Alfredo Jiménez	4:05
7.	"Desapariciones"	Rubén Blades	7:04
8.	"Falta amor"	Fher Olvera	4:15
9.	"Coladito"	Alex González	1:34
10.	"Ana"	Fher Olvera	5:07
11.	"Rayando el Sol"	Fher Olvera, Alex González	5:01
12.	"Se Me Olvidó Otra Vez"	Juan Gabriel	3:43
13.	"Perdido en un Barco"	Fher Olvera, Alex González	4:44
14.	"Oye Mi Amor"	Fher Olvera, Alex González	5:41
Total length:			72:58

== Maná MTV Unplugged DVD ==
Maná MTV Unplugged

Video by Maná
- Released: June 22, 1999
- Recorded: March 9, 1999
- Genres: Rock en Español, Latin Pop
- Label: WEA Latina

Maná chronology
Maná: Éxitos en Vivo (1998)	Maná MTV Unplugged (1999)	Sueños Líquidos Videos (2002)

Maná MTV Unplugged was also released as a DVD. The DVD has the same song tracks as the CD, as well as two bonus music videos "Como Un Lobo Por Tu Amor" and "Me Vale".

=== The concert ===
Fher Olvera wears a T-shirt featuring the masked image of Mexican Zapatista leader Subcomandante Marcos.

=== DVD ===
- MTV Unplugged
- Jump to a song
- The Making of...
- Interviews
- Internet
- Video-Bonus
1. "Como Un Lobo Por Tu Amor" music video
2. "Me Vale" music video
- Discography

The "Me Vale" video is a travelogue with many scenes of the band on tour, including their ride on the Maid of the Mist at Niagara Falls, New York.

== Chart performance ==
=== Album ===
Chart (1999–2000)	Peak position
U.S. Billboard Top Latin Albums	1
U.S. Billboard Latin Pop Albums	1
U.S. Billboard 200	83

== Sales and certifications ==
Region	Certification	Certified units/sales
Argentina (CAPIF)	7× Platinum	420,000^{^}
Brazil (Pro-Música Brasil) DVD	Gold	25,000^{*}
Chile (IFPI)	—	75,000
Mexico (AMPROFON)	6× Platinum	900,000^{‡}
Spain (Promusicae)	4× Platinum	400,000^{^}
United States (RIAA)	Gold	701,000
^{*} Sales figures based on certification alone.^{^} Shipments figures based on certification alone.^{‡} Sales+streaming figures based on certification alone.

== See also ==
- 1999 in Latin music
- List of best-selling albums in Argentina
- List of best-selling Latin albums in the United States
- List of best-selling Latin albums
