= El Hijo del Pueblo (soundtrack) =

Soundtrack album by Vicente Fernández
- Released: 1975
- Genre: Mariachi
- Length: 30:24

Vicente Fernández chronology
El Rey (1974)	El Hijo del Pueblo (1975)	La Ley del Monte (1975)

Professional ratings
Review scores
Source	Rating
Allmusic	4.5/5 stars

El Hijo del Pueblo (The People's Son) is the 1975 soundtrack from the film of the same name. It was later released in the United States in 1991 and is the 25th best-selling Latin album in the country.

== Track listing ==
1. Escuché las Golondrinas
2. La Primera Caricia
3. La Ley del Monte
4. Campanas del Olvido
5. No Me Hagas Menos
6. Dejo de Quererme
7. Hasta la Tumba
8. La Ley de la Vida
9. Que Triste Estoy
10. Le Pese a Quien le Pese
11. El Hijo del Pueblo

== Certifications ==
Region	Certification	Certified units/sales
United States (RIAA)	2× Platinum (Latin)	568,000

== See also ==
- List of best-selling Latin albums in the United States
