= Bendito Entre Las Mujeres =

Studio album by Sergio Vallín
- Released: September 22, 2009
- Recorded: East West Recording Los Angeles, Ca, Glenwood Place Studios Los Angeles, Ca, The Boat Los Angeles, Ca, The Steakhouse Los Angeles, Ca, Sonoland Studios Madrid, Spain, MamaSound Madrid, Spain, Groove Studios, Salvador, Brazil, Urban Production Palma de Mallorca, Spain, Montecristo Studios, Mexico D.F., Ameraycan Los Angeles, Ca, Homey Company Mexico, D.F.
- Genre: Latin Pop/Rock
- Length: 48:00
- Label: WEA Latina
- Producers: Sergio Vallín & Sebastian Krys

Singles from Bendito Entre Las Mujeres
- 1. "Sólo Tú" Released: August 10, 2009

Bendito Entre Las Mujeres (English: Blessed Among Women) is the first solo album by the lead guitarist of Latin rock band Maná, Sergio Vallín. The album was released on September 22, 2009, via Warner Music Latina. On this album which he combines his signature guitar chops with the voices of some of the greatest female singers that includes Spaniards Ana Torroja (of the trio Mecano), Rosana, Natalia Jiménez (of La 5ª Estación), Paulina Rubio, Joy Huerta (of Jesse & Joy), Ely Guerra, Raquel del Rosario (of El Sueño de Morfeo), María José and Brazilian star Ivete Sangalo.

It was produced by Vallín and Sebastian Krys.

The title is a pun on bendita entre las mujeres, which is said in praise of the Virgin Mary.

== Track listing ==
#	Title	Time
1.	Historias de una Nena 1 (Instrumental) (Sergio Vallín)	1:33
2.	Esa Soy Yo featuring Natalia Jiménez (Sergio Vallín)	3:51
3.	Por Que No Te Vas featuring Ana Torroja (Sergio Vallín)	3:29
4.	Palabras Rotas featuring Janette Chao (Sergio Vallín)	3:39
5.	Que Pasa Tío featuring María José (Sergio Vallín)	3:17
6.	Milagro Catastrófico featuring Ely Guerra (Sergio Vallín)	5:04
7.	Fragilidad featuring Joy Huerta (Gordon Sumner)	4:14
8.	Tan Dentro De Mi featuring Rosana (Sergio Vallín)	3:19
9.	No Mas Traiciones featuring Paulina Rubio (Sergio Vallín)	4:10
10.	Sólo Tú featuring Raquel del Rosario (Sergio Vallín)	4:04
11.	Gotas De Ti featuring Ivete Sangalo (Sergio Vallín)	4:25
12.	Por Que Te Vas featuring Rocío Vallín (Sergio Vallín)	4:13
13.	Historias de una Nena 2 (Instrumental 2) (Sergio Vallín)	2:41

== Personnel ==
- Sergio Vallín – guitars, chorus
- Jorginho Luiz *From Brazil – drums
- Fernando Vallín – bass guitar
- Jeff Babko – keyboards
- Luis Conte – percussion
- Chorus: Alih Jey, Karla Vallín & Sebastian Krys
- Choir of Flamenco for: "Que Pasa Tío" : Macarena Rodriguez
- Mariachi: Mariachi Divas de Cindy Shea
