= Te llevaré al cielo =

Single by Maná

from the album Esenciales: Luna
- Released: October 13, 2003
- Recorded: August 18–21, 2003 at Conway Studios in Los Angeles, Ca
- Genre: Latin
- Length: 4:44
- Songwriter: Fher Olvera

Maná singles chronology
"Mariposa Traicionera" (2003)	"Te llevaré al cielo" (2003)	"Baila Morena" (2006)

"Te llevaré al cielo" (English: I'll take you to Heaven) is the only single released from Maná's compilation album, Esenciales: Luna (2003). This single was released in promotion of their three CD set compilation albums: The Essentiales: Esenciales: Luna, Esenciales: Sol and Esenciales: Eclipse. This single top at number 7 on the Billboard Hot Latin Tracks and stayed for a total of 22 weeks.
