= List of best-selling Latin albums in the United States =

Selena's Dreaming of You (1995) is the best-selling Latin album in the US. Her previous album Amor Prohibido (1994) is the US's fourth highest-selling Latin album.

Since July 1993, Billboard has published the best-selling Latin albums in the United States on the Top Latin Albums chart. Latin music is defined by Billboard and the Recording Industry Association of America (RIAA) as a music release with 51 percent or more of its content in the Spanish language. On October 17, 2017, Billboard published a list of the 25 best-selling Latin albums in country since September 1992. As of October 2017, the best-selling Latin album in the United States is Dreaming of You by Selena, her fifth and final studio album, which was posthumously released in 1995. It has sold three million copies since its release. Dreaming of You became the first predominantly Spanish-language album to top the Billboard 200 and was the best-selling Latin album of 1995 and 1996. Selena's fourth studio album, Amor Prohibido, has sold more than 1,246,000 copies and is the fourth best-selling Latin album in the United States.

Sales data is compiled by Nielsen SoundScan from a sample that includes music stores, music departments at electronics and stores, Internet sales (both physical and digital) and verifiable sales from concert venues in the United States. Nielsen SoundScan has tracked sales of records in the country since March 1991. SoundScan does not include sales from small retailers without electronic cash registers and nontraditional outlets such as flea markets and drugstores. Prior to the inception of the Top Latin Albums chart, sales of Latin albums were reported by Latin music retailers and distributors and divided into three subcategories: Latin Pop, Tropical/Salsa, and Regional Mexican.

Sales certifications for US album sales are presented by the RIAA, who began awarding certifications in 1958. Initially, certifications were based on units shipped to retail outlets: sales of 500,000 are awarded gold, 1,000,000 for platinum and 2,000,000 or more for multi-platinum. On February 1, 2016, the RIAA updated its methodology for certifying albums by including audio streaming and track sales equivalent. Beginning in 2000, the RIAA launched the Gold and Platinum Awards (Spanish: Los Premios Oro y Platino) to acknowledge the Latin music market in the United States. As of December 20, 2013, the current thresholds for the Latin certifications are 30,000 sales for gold (Disco de oro), 60,000 sales for platinum (Disco de platino), and 120,000 sales or more for multi-platinum (Disco de multi-platino). The previous thresholds for Latin certifications were 50,000 sales for gold, 100,000 sales for platinum, and 200,000 sales for multi-platinum.

The first Latin artist to have two Spanish-language albums certified platinum was Luis Miguel, with Romance and Segundo Romance. The latter album is also the 21st best-selling Latin record in the United States with sales of over 603,000 copies. Me Estoy Enamorando by Alejandro Fernández and Vuelve by Ricky Martin were the best-selling Latin albums of 1998 and 1999, respectively, and were both certified platinum by the RIAA. Shakira and Maná are the only acts with more than two albums on the list. Shakira's albums Pies Descalzos and Dónde Están los Ladrones? were both certified Platinum while her 2005 album, Fijación Oral, Vol. 1 was certified eleven times Disco de platino. Maná is the act with the most entries on the list, with four albums: ¿Dónde Jugarán los Niños?, Sueños Líquidos, MTV Unplugged and Amar es Combatir. As of November 2017, the most-certified album is Dreaming of You, which has been awarded Disco de platino 62 times, representing 3,720,000 units.

== Best-selling albums ==
Positions are as of October 2017; sales, where shown, are from the reference given, which may be at a different date, and cannot be used to infer changes in position.

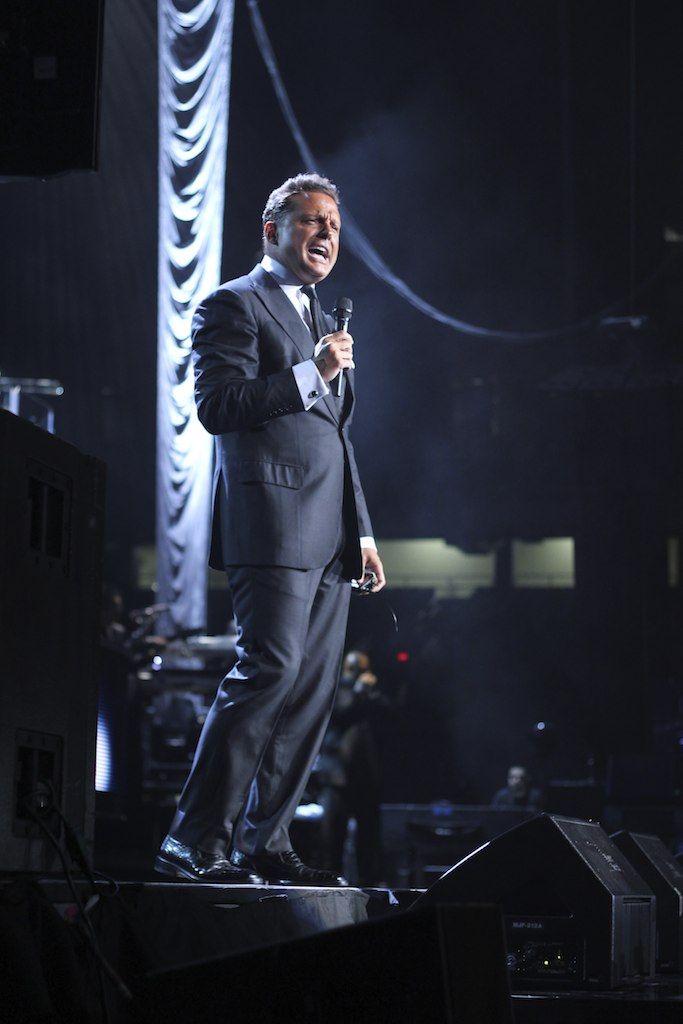
Luis Miguel was the first Latin artist to have two Spanish-language albums certified platinum.

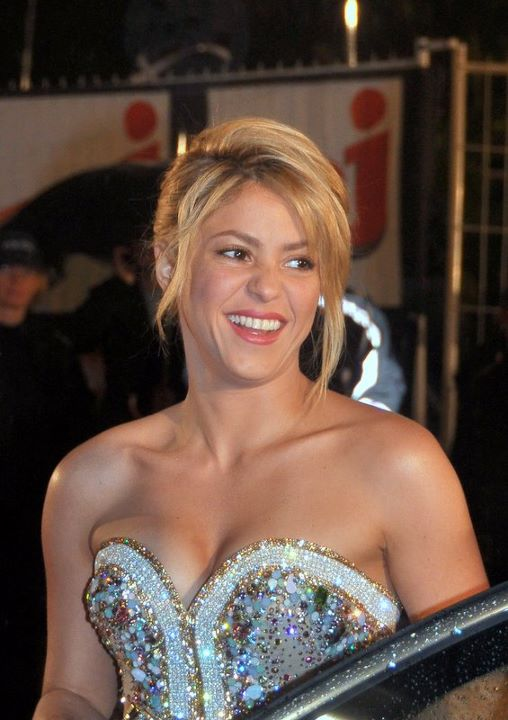
Colombian singer Shakira has three of the best-selling Latin albums in the US.

Key
Gold	Gold certification (500,000 units)
Platinum	Platinum certification (1,000,000 units)
Platinum (Latin)†	Disco de Platino certification (100,000 units) (Note: For albums certified Disco de platino before December 20, 2013.)
Platinum (Latin)‡	Disco de Platino certification (60,000 units) (Note: For albums certified Disco de platino after December 20, 2013.)

Top 25 best-selling Latin albums in the US (Note: Since September 7, 1992)
No.	Album	Artist	Record label (Note: The record labels and release dates are those given by the RIAA.)	Released	Chart peak (Note: The charts are those given by Billboard magazine.)	Sales (as of date)	Certification
1	Dreaming of You	Selena	EMI Latin	July 18, 1995	1	3,000,000 (Dec 2020)	62× Platinum (Latin)‡
2	Buena Vista Social Club	Buena Vista Social Club	Nonesuch/Atlantic	September 5, 1997	1	1,925,000 (Oct 2017)	Platinum
3	The Best of the Gipsy Kings	Gipsy Kings	Nonesuch/Atlantic	February 27, 1995	2	1,563,000 (Oct 2017)	Platinum
4	Amor Prohibido	Selena	EMI Latin	March 13, 1994	1	1,246,000 (Oct 2017)	41× Platinum (Latin)‡
5	Historia de un Ídolo, Vol. 1	Vicente Fernández	Sony Discos	November 17, 2000	1	1,242,000 (Oct 2017)	Gold
6	Mi Tierra	Gloria Estefan	Epic	June 14, 1993	1	1,232,000 (Oct 2017)	16× Platinum (Latin)†
7	Barrio Fino	Daddy Yankee	VI Music	July 13, 2004	1	1,083,000 (Oct 2017)	Platinum
8	Fijación Oral, Vol. 1	Shakira	Epic	June 7, 2005	1	1,019,000 (Oct 2017)	11× Platinum (Latin)†
9	Dónde Están los Ladrones?	Shakira	Sony Discos	September 2, 1998	1	920,000 (Oct 2017)	Platinum
10	Vuelve	Ricky Martin	Sony Discos	February 28, 1998	1	888,000 (Oct 2017)	Platinum
11	Suavemente	Elvis Crespo	Sony Tropical	April 7, 1998	1	879,000 (Oct 2017)	26× Platinum (Latin)‡
12	¿Dónde Jugarán los Niños?	Maná	WEA Latina	November 13, 1992	4	856,000 (Oct 2017)	12× Platinum (Latin)†
13	Barrio Fino en Directo	Daddy Yankee	VI Music	December 13, 2005	1	809,000 (Oct 2017)	Gold
14	Un Día Normal	Juanes	Universal Music Latino	May 21, 2002	1	745,000 (Oct 2017)	18× Platinum (Latin)‡
15	Mi Sangre	Juanes	Universal Music Latino	September 28, 2004	1	739,000 (Oct 2017)	2× Diamond (Latin)‡
16	Sueños Líquidos	Maná	WEA Latina	October 17, 1997	1	706,000 (Oct 2017)	Platinum
17	Amar es Combatir	Maná	Warner Music Latina	August 22, 2006	1	702,000 (Oct 2017)	16× Platinum (Latin)‡
18	MTV Unplugged	Maná	WEA Latina	June 22, 1999	1	701,000 (Oct 2017)	Gold
19	Romances	Luis Miguel	WEA Latina	August 27, 1997	1	687,000 (Oct 2017)	Platinum
20	Pa'l Mundo	Wisin & Yandel	Machete Music	November 8, 2005	1	676,000 (Oct 2017)	Gold
21	Segundo Romance	Luis Miguel	WEA Latina	August 30, 1994	1	603,000 (Oct 2017)	Platinum
22	Trozos de Mi Alma	Marco Antonio Solís	Fonovisa	January 26, 1999	1	598,000 (Oct 2017)	Platinum
23	Pies Descalzos	Shakira	Sony Discos	February 13, 1996	5	580,000 (Oct 2017)	Platinum
24	Me Estoy Enamorando	Alejandro Fernández	Sony Discos	September 25, 1997	1	576,000 (Oct 2017)	Platinum
25	El Hijo del Pueblo	Vicente Fernández	Sony Discos	January 18, 1991	—	568,000 (Oct 2017)	2× Platinum (Latin)†

== See also ==
- List of best-selling albums in the United States
- List of best-selling Latin singles in the United States
- List of best-selling Latin albums
