= Arde el Cielo (song) =

Single by Maná

from the album Arde El Cielo
- Released: June 30, 2008
- Recorded: at Jim Henson Studios Hollywood, CA & Puerta Azul Studios Puerto Vallarta, Mx
- Genre: Hard rock/Spanish rock
- Length: 4:33
- Label: Warner/WEA International
- Songwriter: Fher Olvera
- Producers: Fher Olvera & Alex González

Maná singles chronology
"Si No Te Hubieras Ido" (2008)	"Arde el Cielo (song)" (2008)	"Lluvia al Corazón" (2011)

"Arde el Cielo" ( English: The Sky Burns ) is the second radio single and fourteenth track from Maná's third live album, Arde El Cielo (2008). On August 9, 2008 the song debuted at fifty on the U.S. Billboard Hot Latin Tracks.

== Music video ==
The music video for the song was directed by Diego González and Tim Zimmer. It has footage of environmental issues and major historical, often tragic events.

== Charts ==
Chart (2008)	Peak position
US Billboard Hot Latin Tracks	26
US Billboard Latin Pop Airplay	14
Venezuela Singles Chart	6
