= Como Te Extraño Corazón =

Single by Maná

from the album Sueños Líquidos
- Released: November 28, 1998
- Recorded: Conway Studios in Los Angeles, Ca, Ocean Way Recording Hollywood, Ca and Puerta Azul-Mobile Puerto Vallarta, Mexico
- Genre: Latin Rock
- Length: 5:10
- Label: WEA Latina
- Songwriter: Fher Olvera
- Producers: Fher Olvera & Alex González

Maná singles chronology
"En El Muelle De San Blás" (1998)	"Como Te Extraño Corazón" (1998)	"Se Me Olvidó Otra Vez" (1999)

"Cómo Te Extraño Corazón" (English: How I miss you darling [lit. "my heart"]) is the fifth and last radio single and eleventh track from Maná's fifth studio album, Sueños Líquidos in 1997. On the week of November 28, 1998, the song debuted, peaking at number 31 on the U.S. Billboard Hot Latin Tracks. It stayed for a total of two weeks.

== Charts ==
Chart (1998)	Peak position
US Billboard Hot Latin Tracks	31
US Billboard Latin Pop Airplay	16
