= Grandes y San Martín =

- Municipality
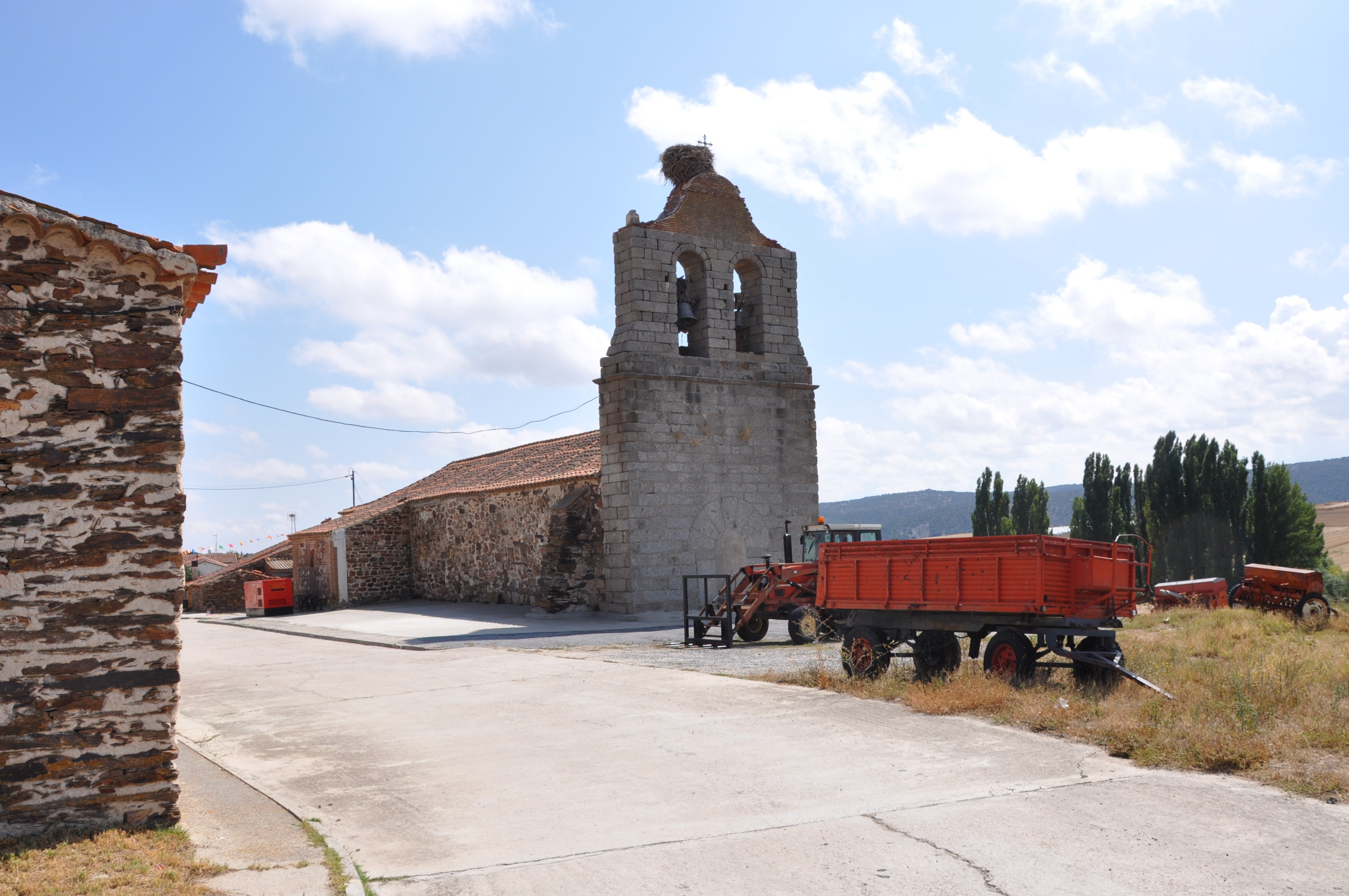
- Church of San Juan Bautista
- Flag Coat of arms
- Location in Spain. Grandes y San Martín (Spain)
- Coordinates: 40°45′21″N 4°57′20″W
- Country: Spain
- Autonomous community: Castile and León
- Province: Ávila
- Municipality: Grandes y San Martín

Area
  - Total: 11.59 km^{2} (4.47 sq mi)
- Elevation: 1,005 m (3,297 ft)

Population (2025-01-01)
  - Total: 34
  - Density: 2.9/km^{2} (7.6/sq mi)
- Time zone: UTC+1 (CET)
  - Summer (DST): UTC+2 (CEST)
- Website: Official website

Grandes y San Martín is a municipality located in the province of Ávila, Castile and León, Spain.

== Population ==
Historical population
Year	Pop.	±% p.a.
2023	36	—
2024	32	−11.11%
2025	34	+6.25%
Source: INE
