= Si No Te Hubieras Ido =

1999 single by Marco Antonio Solís

"Si no te hubieras ido"

Song by Marisela
- Genre: Latin
- Songwriter: Marco Antonio Solís
- Producer: Marco Antonio Solís

"Si No Te Hubieras Ido" ("If You Hadn't Left") is a song written by Mexican singer-songwriter Marco Antonio Solís, which has been recorded by a number of performers, including Marco Antonio Solis, Charlie Cruz, and Maná.

== Song history ==
The song was written in 1983 and was first included in the album Sin El by singer Marisela. The album was written and produced by Solís in 1984. The song was released as a single and became very successful in Mexico. The singer later included it on her live album Tu Dama de Hierro released on 27 April 1999 as a part of a medley with two other songs written by Solís: "Vete con Ella" and "No Puedo Olvidarlo". "No Puedo Olvidarlo" was re-recorded by Marco Antonio Solís as "No Puedo Olvidarla" and became a Top Ten hit in the Billboard Hot Latin Tracks in 2007.

== Marco Antonio Solís re-recording ==
"Si no te hubieras ido"

Single by Marco Antonio Solís

from the album Trozos de Mi Alma
- Released: 23 November 1998
- Genre: Latin
- Length: 4:48
- Label: Fonovisa
- Songwriter: Marco Antonio Solís
- Producer: Bebu Silvetti

Marco Antonio Solís singles chronology
"Casas de Cartón" (1998)	"Si no te hubieras ido" (1998)	"Inventame" (1999)

Marco Antonio Solís re-recorded the track to include it on his album Trozos de Mi Alma, a collection of songs written by him previously recorded by several performers. This version was featured in the movie Y Tu Mamá También and in the movie soundtrack, and became another top-ten smash for Solís, peaking at number four in the Billboard Hot Latin Tracks chart. It is also recognized as one of Solís's signature songs.

Chart (1999)	Peak position
US Billboard Hot Latin Tracks	4
US Billboard Latin Pop Airplay	5
US Billboard Latin Regional Mexican Airplay	16
US Billboard Latin Tropical/Salsa Airplay	21

== Charlie Cruz version ==
"Si no te hubieras ido"

Single by Charlie Cruz

from the album Asi Soy
- Released: 2000
- Genre: Latin
- Length: 4:48
- Label: WEA
- Songwriter: Marco Antonio Solís

Charlie Cruz singles chronology
"Amarte Es Un Problema" (2000)	"Si no te hubieras ido" (2000)	"Un Chin Chin" (2001)

In 2000, Puerto Rican salsa musician Charlie Cruz covered Si no te hubieras ido on his album, Así Soy. The song was the second single released from the album and did not fare on the charts, only peaking #40 on the Hot Latin Tracks.

Chart (2000)	Peak position
US Billboard Hot Latin Tracks	40
US Billboard Latin Tropical/Salsa Airplay	13

== Maná version ==
"Si no te hubieras ido"

Single by Maná

from the album Arde el Cielo
- Released: 3 March 2008
- Genre: Latin; Pop rock
- Length: 4:30
- Label: Warner Bros.
- Songwriter: Marco Antonio Solís
- Producer: Fernando Olvera

Maná singles chronology
"El Rey Tiburón" (2008)	"Si no te hubieras ido" (2008)	"Arde el Cielo" (2008)

Mexican rock band Maná recorded the track for their new live album titled Arde El Cielo, due 29 April 2008. The single was released to radio on 3 March 2008, and debuted at number 7 in the Billboard Hot Latin Tracks chart in the week of 12 April 2008, climbing to number 1, 2 weeks later.

Chart (2008–2009)	Peak position
Spain Airplay Chart	4
Spain Singles Chart	2
US Billboard Hot Latin Tracks	1
US Billboard Latin Pop Airplay	1
US Billboard Latin Tropical Airplay	8
Venezuela Singles Chart	8

=== Certifications and sales ===
Region	Certification	Certified units/sales
Mexico (AMPROFON) Master ringtone	Gold	10,000^{*}
Spain (Promusicae) Ringtone	3× Platinum	60,000^{*}
^{*} Sales figures based on certification alone.

== Music video ==
The music video for the song was directed by Pablo Croce.

== See also ==
- List of number-one Billboard Hot Latin Songs of 2008
