= El reloj cucú =

"El Reloj Cucú"

Single by Maná

from the album Cuando los Ángeles Lloran
- Released: March 16, 1996
- Recorded: Record Plant Studios, Hollywood, California, Funny Farm Studios, Studio City, Ca and Puerta Azul-Mobile Puerto Vallarta, Mexico
- Genre: Latin Rock / Pop rock
- Length: 5:02
- Label: WEA Latina
- Songwriter: Fher Olvera
- Producers: Fher Olvera & Alex González

Maná singles chronology
"Hundido En Un Rincón" (1995)	"El Reloj Cucú" (1996)	"Clavado En Un Bar" (1997)

"El Reloj Cucú" (English: The Cuckoo Clock) is the fifth radio single and the fourth track from Maná's fourth studio album, Cuando los Ángeles Lloran in 1995. On the week of March 16, 1996 the song debuted at number forty on the U.S. Billboard Hot Latin Tracks and three weeks later on March 30, 1996, it reached its highest point at the number thirty-four spot for only one week. It would stay for a total of 3 weeks.

In 2021 it was re-released featuring 12-year-old Mexican singer Mabel Vázquez.

== Lyrics ==
The song is about a child whose father died. The singer remembers the father putting them to bed and turning off the light. The chorus asks the cuckoo clock to turn on the light and turn off the time.

== Charts ==
Chart (1996)	Peak position
US Billboard Hot Latin Tracks	34
US Billboard Latin Pop Airplay	5

== Covers ==
Maelo Ruiz a performed a salsa version of the song which peaked at #20 on the Billboard Tropical Songs chart.
