= Hundido En Un Rincón =

Single by Maná

from the album Cuando los Ángeles Lloran
- Released: October 7, 1995
- Recorded: Record Plant Studios, Hollywood, California, Funny Farm Studios, Studio City, Ca and Puerta Azul-Mobile Puerto Vallarta, Mexico
- Genre: Latin Rock / Pop rock
- Length: 6:01
- Label: WEA Latina
- Songwriter: Fher Olvera
- Producers: Fher Olvera & Alex González

Maná singles chronology
"No Ha Parado De Llover" (1995)	"Hundido En Un Rincón" (1995)	"El Reloj Cucú" (1996)

"Hundido En Un Rincón" (English: Depressed in a corner) is the second radio single and the third track from Maná's fourth studio album, Cuando los Ángeles Lloran in 1995. On the week of October 7, 1995 the song debuted at number twenty-five on the U.S. Billboard Hot Latin Tracks and after two weeks later on October 21, 1995 it reach to its highest point at the number twelve spot for only one week. It would stayed for a total of 6 weeks.

== Charts ==
Chart (1995)	Peak position
US Billboard Hot Latin Tracks	12
US Billboard Latin Pop Airplay	5
