= Sueños Líquidos =

Studio album by Maná
- Released: October 14, 1997
- Recorded: 1997
- Studio: A&M Records; Classic Recording Rentals; Conway Studios (Hollywood, California); Mad Hatter Studios; Puerta Azul-Mobile Studio; Quinta del Mar (Puerto Vallarta, Mexico)
- Genre: Latin Rock
- Length: 59:35
- Label: WEA Latina
- Producer: Fher Olvera · Álex González

Maná chronology
Cuando los Ángeles Lloran (1995)	Sueños Líquidos (1997)	MTV Unplugged (1999)

Alternative cover
- from the album booklet

Singles from Sueños Líquidos
- 1. "Clavado En Un Bar" Released: September 13, 1997; 2. "Hechicera" Released: December 13, 1997; 3. "Cómo Dueles En Los Labios" Released: February 14, 1998; 4. "En el muelle de San Blas" Released: May 23, 1998; 5. "Cómo Te Extraño Corazón" Released: November 28, 1998

Professional ratings
Review scores
Source	Rating
Allmusic	2/5 stars
Chicago Tribune	3/4 stars

Sueños Líquidos (Spanish for Liquid Dreams) is the fifth studio album (ninth overall) recorded by Mexican rock band Maná, It was released by WEA Latina on October 14, 1997 (see 1997 in music). After its release for the first time in over 36 countries across the globe, the band began to receive wide international attention, especially in Spain and the U.S., where the album sold over one million copies. This album was born of the desire to create an environment where water, a vital element, has an important presence. Because of this, the record was recorded in the coastal city of Puerto Vallarta, an important location in the creative atlas of Maná. Sueños Líquidos garnered Maná its first Grammy Award, for Best Latin Rock/Alternative Performance. The album was given a Premio Lo Nuestro award for "Pop Album of the Year" which was shared with Shakira for "¿Dónde están los ladrones?. It was released on DVD-Audio format in 2001. As of 2002, it has sold 3.5 million copies. The album's "[pop] sensibility and successful experimentalism" was praised upon release.

== Track listing ==
No.	Title	Writer(s)	Length
1.	"Hechicera (Sorceress)"	Fher Olvera, Alex González	4:58
2.	"Un Lobo Por Tu Amor (A Wolf for Your Love)"	Fher Olvera, Alex González	5:21
3.	"Cómo Dueles en los Labios (How You Hurt the Lips)"	Fher Olvera	4:08
4.	"Chamán (Shaman)"	Fher Olvera, Alex González	5:11
5.	"Tu Tienes Lo Que Quiero (You've Got What I Want)"	Alex González	4:38
6.	"Clavado en un Bar (Stuck in a Bar)"	Fher Olvera	5:11
7.	"Róbame el Alma (Steal My Soul)"	Fher Olvera, Alex González	4:04
8.	"En el muelle de San Blas (On the Pier of San Blas)"	Fher Olvera, Alex González	5:51
9.	"La Sirena (The Mermaid)"	Fher Olvera	5:28
10.	"Me Voy a Convertir En Un Ave (I Will Become a Bird)"	Fher Olvera	5:00
11.	"Como Te Extraño Corazón (How I Miss You, My Love)"	Fher Olvera	5:10
12.	"Ámame Hasta Que Me Muera (Love Me Till I Die)"	Fher Olvera, Sergio Vallín	4:30
Total length:			72:58

After the final track, "Ámame Hasta Que Me Muera," there is a backmasked track. Those who found this early, won tickets to their shows.

== Charts ==
Chart (1997)	Peak position
U.S. Billboard 200	67
U.S. Billboard Top Latin Albums	1
U.S. Billboard Latin Pop Albums	1

== Sales and certifications ==
Region	Certification	Certified units/sales
Argentina (CAPIF)	2× Platinum	120,000^{^}
Mexico (AMPROFON)	Diamond+2× Gold	1,200,000^{‡}
United States (RIAA)	Platinum	706,000
Venezuela	3× Platinum	70,000
^{^} Shipments figures based on certification alone.^{‡} Sales+streaming figures based on certification alone.

== Personnel ==
- Fher Olvera – main vocals, electric guitar, acoustic guitar and harmonica
- Alex González – drums, vocals, electric percussion and programming
- Juan Diego Calleros – electric and acoustic bass
- Sergio Vallín – acoustic and electric guitar

=== Guest performers ===
- Juan Carlos Toribio – keyboards, programming
- Luis Conte – percussion
- Bob Tansen – flute on "Como Dueles En Los Labios"
- José L. Quintana – background vocals
- Randy Walman – keyboards, samples on "Como Dueles En Los Labios" and "La Sirena"
- Pablo Aguirre – programming
- Rick Bartist – trumpet
- Doug Michael

== See also ==
- 1997 in Latin music
- List of number-one Billboard Top Latin Albums of 1997
- List of best-selling Latin albums
- List of best-selling Latin albums in the United States
- List of best-selling albums in Mexico
