= Sergio Vallín =

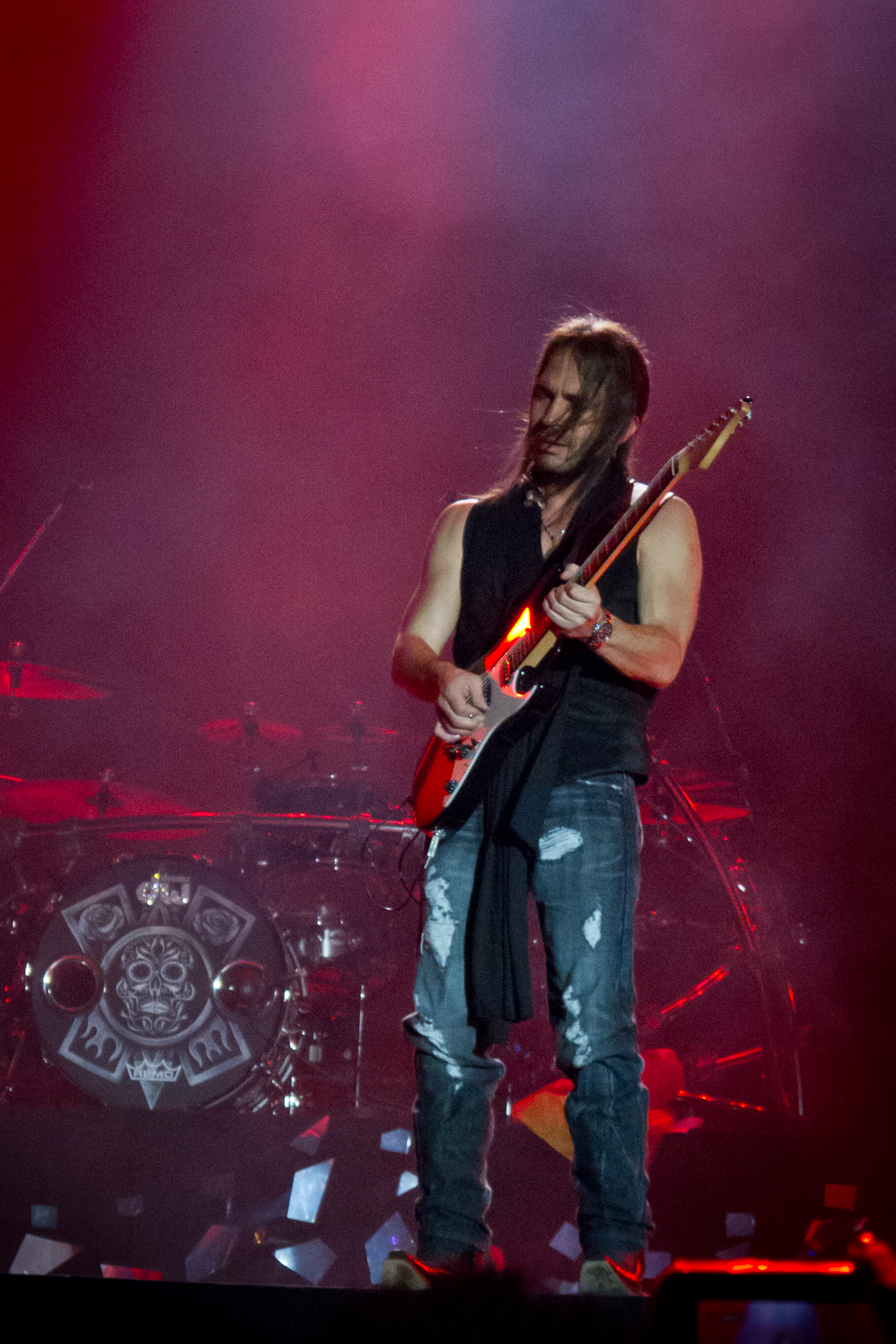
- Maná - Rock in Rio Madrid 2012

Background information
- Born: Sergio Vallín Loera; 26 May 1972 (age 54)
- Origin: Mexico City, Mexico
- Genres: Rock
- Occupations: Musician; songwriter
- Instruments: Guitar; vocals
- Years active: 1995–present
- Label: Warner/WEA International
- Member of: Maná

Sergio Vallín Loera (born May 26, 1972) is a Mexican guitarist of the Mexican band Maná. Vallín was born in Mexico City, where he lived for the first ten years of his life until he moved with his family to Aguascalientes, capital of the state of the same name. Thus he has nicknamed himself "Hidrocálido", after one of the demonyms for his adopted city.

== Early music ==
He had his first contact with music when he became part of a local student music group when he was 8. At the age of ten he began to feel attracted to bands like The Beatles, The Rolling Stones, and The Doors. When he was thirteen in Aguascalientes, he took classical guitar lessons. He received his first salary as a musician, when he began to give private guitar lessons to other young kids in his same age group. He formed the band "Wando" with his siblings Rocío and Fernando Vallín, and Emilio. "Wando" won first place in the contest "Valores Juveniles Bacardí" in 1993 in the group category with "Puedo gritarlo frente a ti". (Ana Bárbara won first prize in the singles category in the same contest).

During a Luis Miguel concert, Sergio met guitarist Kiko Cibrián, to whom he gave a copy of his guitar demo. The demo passed from person to person until it reached Fher Olvera, Maná vocalist, who was looking for a guitarist for the band after the departure of Ulises Calleros and César "Vampiro" López. Olvera was greatly impressed with Vallín's style, and asked him to audition. Fher was very pleased with Sergio's audition, telling Sergio: "eres un bombon asesino", meaning "he's really good". Vallín was chosen after trying out more than eighty guitarists and since 1994 has formed part of Maná.

== Maná ==
After a few collaborations with the band, doing covers of "Celoso" from Los Panchos and "Fool in the Rain" from Led Zeppelin, Maná recorded Cuando los ángeles lloran in 1995, the first studio album with Sergio as lead guitar. Vallín has recorded five other studio albums; Sueños Líquidos (1997), Revolución de Amor (2002), Amar es Combatir (2006), Drama Y Luz (2011), and Cama Incendiada (2015), as well as the Maná MTV Unplugged (1999).

== Composer ==
The tour "Jalisco Power" alongside Carlos Santana holds special significance to Sergio Vallín. They had previously composed "Corazón Espinado" specially for Santana which now features on his production Supernatural. Sergio has admitted that playing next to the idol of his early life has been one of the most gratifying events of his career.

Sergio's importance to the group has grown through the four albums. He debuted as a composer in Sueños Líquidos, with the flamenco influenced song "Ámame hasta que muera". He debuted as a singer in Revolución de Amor with the theme "¿Por qué te vas?" dedicated to his parents. In this album he also composed "No voy a ser tu esclavo" and collaborated again with Santana in the guitar solo of "Justicia Tierra y Libertad". In Amar es Combatir he wrote three songs: the cumbia "Somos Mar y Arena", "Relax", and "Bendita tu Luz". Sergio, who is considered one of the best Latin guitarists, is an admirer of flamenco, Paco de Lucía and Tomatito, and has become involved in projects outside of Maná. He has worked as the producer of new artists like Chío and Serralde, and is currently working on the project "Escuela de Música México Contemporáneo".

== Solo discography ==
=== Studio album ===
- 2009: Bendito Entre Las Mujeres (Blessed Among Women) (Release on 09/22/09)
- 2021: Microsinfonías (Release on 01/11/21)
