= Clavado en un Bar =

Single by Maná

from the album Sueños Líquidos
- Released: 5 September 1997
- Genre: Reggae rock
- Length: 5:11 (album version); 4:20 (radio edit)
- Label: WEA Latina
- Songwriter: Fher Olvera
- Producers: Fher Olvera; Alex González; Benny Faccone

Maná singles chronology
"El Reloj Cucú" (1996)	"Clavado en un Bar" (1997)	"Hechicera" (1997)

"Clavado en un Bar" (English: "Stuck in a Bar") is a song by Mexican band Maná from their fifth studio album, Sueños Líquidos (1997). The song was written by the band's lead vocalist Fher Olvera, who handled the production alongside drummer Alex González and Benny Faccone. It was released as the album's lead single on 5 September 1997. A reggae rock "heartbreak" song, the protagonist is depicted as stuck in a bar waiting for his lover to return.

"Clavado en un Bar" received positive reactions from music critics, who favorably compared it to other rock bands and received an American Society of Composers, Authors and Publishers (ASCAP) Latin Award on the Pop/Ballad field in 1998. In the United States, it peaked at numbers twelve and five on the Billboard Hot Latin Songs and Latin Pop Airplay charts, respectively. The song was covered by Dominican Republic singer José Alberto "El Canario" on his studio album Herido (1999), and his version peaked at number 10 on the Billboard Tropical Airplay chart.

== Background and composition ==
On 24 June 1997, Maná confirmed that they were working on their fifth studio album, Sueños Líquidos (1997) with recording taking place at the Quinta Del Mar and the Puerta Azul-Mobile Studio, both located in Puerto Vallarta, Mexico. Additional recordings took place at Classic Recording Rentals, Conway Recording Studios and Mad Hatter Studios all located in Hollywood, California. "Clavado en un Bar" was mixed at the A&M Studios in Hollywood, California. Fher Olvera wrote the song for Sueños Líquidos and co-produced it with drummer Alex González and record producer Benny Faccone.

"Clavado en un Bar" is a "punkish reggae rock song. According to Gonzalez: "Fher wanted to write a heartbreak song, like how in many mariachi songs (the protagonist) usually ends up in a cantina, drinking and lamenting, 'why did she leave me!' — but in a rock version." The San Antonio Express-News editor Ramiro Burr noted that Olvera "mixes pain and pride" as the artist sings in Spanish: "I'm here trying to alleviate my pain. It's not working. But I'm not leaving till you come rescue me." Olvera also mentioned that "Clavado en un Bar" was inspired by José Alfredo Jiménez's songs.

== Promotion and reception ==
"Clavado en un Bar" was released as the album's lead single on 5 September 1997. A music video for the song was filmed and features a drunk man on top of a building reminiscing his old love with scenes alternating with the band performing at the same spot. A live version of the track was included on the album Arde el Cielo (2008). Maná performed "Clavado en un Bar" live, along with "Labios Compartidos", at the Person of the Year gala in 2018 where they were honored with the accolade, and again at the 19th Annual Latin Grammy Awards the following day.

Ernesto Lechner of the Los Angeles Times commented that the "legions of fans will probably embrace the catchy rocker", while Burr lauded its "feverish reggae rhythms". Don Mayhew of The Fresno Bee stated that the track "comes on with all the swagger of The Rolling Stones" and praised Olvera's vocals as "pure Sting, appropriate since the song builds into a steady, soaring chorus worthy of The Police". Similarly, the Newsday editor Richard Torres felt that the song is "reminiscent of the reggae power pop of The Police". The Miami Herald reviewer Leila Cobo-Hanlon called it a "reggae-inspired hit". An editor from Billboard called it the "perfect song" for "trying to forget someone"

The track was recognized as one of the best-performing songs of the year on the Pop/Ballad field at the 1998 American Society of Composers, Authors and Publishers (ASCAP) Latin Awards. In the United States, "Clavado en un Bar" reached number 12 on the Billboard Hot Latin Songs chart, making it the highest ranked Spanish-language rock song at the time. The song also peaked number five on the Latin Pop Airplay chart. Dominican Republic salsa singer José Alberto "El Canario" covered "Clavado en un Bar on his studio album Herido (1999). His version peaked at number 10 on the Billboard Tropical Airplay chart in the US. The song was used on the American television series New Girl for the episode of the same name, where it was played at a jukebox on Clyde's Bar.

== Formats and track listings ==
US promo single

1. "Clavado en un Bar" (album version) – 5:11
2. "Clavado en un Bar" (radio edit) – 4:20

Mexican remix single

1. "Clavado en un Bar" – 5:11
2. "Clavado en un Bar" (Drila Club Mix) – 5:07
3. "Clavado en un Bar" (Drila Club Mix) (radio edit) – 4:46
4. "Clavado en un Bar" (Hard Club Mix) – 5:55
5. "Clavado en un Bar" (Music Mix) – 5:06
6. "Clavado en un Bar" (Bombo Remix) – 5:20
7. "Clavado en un Bar" (Bombo Music Remix) – 5:20

== Personnel ==
Credits adapted from AllMusic.

- Fher Olvera – co-production, vocals, songwriting
- Alex González – co-production
- Benny Faccone – co-production

== Charts ==
Chart performance for "Clavado en un Bar"
Chart (1997)	Peak position
US Hot Latin Songs (Billboard)	12
US Latin Pop Airplay (Billboard)	5

Chart performance for José Alberto's version
Chart (1999)	Peak position
US Tropical Airplay (Billboard)	10

== Certifications ==
Certifications for "Clavado en un Bar"
Region	Certification	Certified units/sales
United States (RIAA)	16× Platinum (Latin)	960,000^{‡}
^{‡} Sales+streaming figures based on certification alone.
