= Cuando los Ángeles Lloran =

Cuando Los Ángeles Lloran

Studio album by Maná
- Released: April 25, 1995
- Recorded: 1994
- Studio: Record Plant (Hollywood); Funny Farm (Studio City); Puerta Azul-Mobile (Puerto Vallarta)
- Genre: Rock; Latin
- Length: 60:53
- Label: Warner Music
- Producer: Fher Olvera; Alex González

Maná chronology
Maná en Vivo (1994)	Cuando Los Ángeles Lloran (1995)	Sueños Líquidos (1997)

Singles from Cuando los Ángeles Lloran
- 1. "No Ha Parado De Llover" Released: April 3, 1995; 2. "Hundido En Un Rincón" Released: June 25, 1995; 3. "Déjame Entrar" Released: December 4, 1995; 4. "El Reloj Cucú" Released: April 8, 1996; 5. "Como Un Perro Enloquecido" Released: May 5, 1996

Cuando Los Ángeles Lloran (English: When the Angels Cry) is the eighth album and fourth studio album by Mexican rock band Maná. It was the first album to feature their new guitarist Sergio Vallín replacing Ulises Calleros & César "Vampiro" López. As of 1996, it has sold over 1.5 million copies.

The album, which marked a clear evolution in Maná's compositions, was recorded between Los Angeles and Puerto Vallarta throughout 1994, although its release was postponed to 1995. The singles that accompanied the release of the album, Déjame entrar, No ha parado de llover and Como un perro had a great impact on radio stations and the videos that accompanied them received numerous awards for their technical and aesthetic quality.

Cuando Los Ángeles Lloran was nominated for a 1996 Grammy Award for Best Latin Pop Performance.

The song that gave its name to the album is in recognition of Chico Mendes, a Brazilian environmentalist who was murdered.

== Track listing ==
#	Title	Time
1.	Como un Perro Enloquecido (Like a Crazed Dog) (Fher Olvera, Alex González)	4:28
2.	Selva Negra (Black Jungle) (Fher Olvera)	5:48
3.	Hundido En Un Rincón (Depressed in a Corner) (Fher Olvera)	6:01
4.	El Reloj Cucú (The Cuckoo Clock) (Fher Olvera)	5:05
5.	Mis Ojos (My Eyes) (Fher Olvera)	4:58
6.	Ana (Fher Olvera)	5:01
7.	Siembra el Amor (Sow the Love) (Fher Olvera)	5:17
8.	Cuando Los Ángeles Lloran (When Angels Cry) (Fher Olvera)	5:12
9.	Déjame Entrar (Let Me In) (Fher Olvera)	4:26
10.	No Ha Parado De Llover (It Hasn't Stopped Raining) (Fher Olvera, Alex González)	5:24
11.	Antifaz (Mask) (Fher Olvera, Alex González)	5:01
12.	El Borracho (The Drunk) (Alex González)	4:44

== Personnel ==
- Fher Olvera – lead vocals, acoustic guitar, electric guitar, harmonics, choir
- Alex González – drums, electric percussion, lead vocals in "Como Un Perro Enloquecido" and "El Borracho", choir
- Juan Calleros – bass guitar
- Sergio Vallín; acoustic guitar, electric guitar, sitar coral

== Invited Guests ==
- Juan Carlos Toribio – keyboards, piano, Hammond B-3 organ
- Luis Conte – percussions
- David Hidalgo – accordion on "El Borracho"
- David Shamban – cello on "Hundido En Un Rincón"
- Ramon Flores – brass on "Déjame Entrar"
- Eric Jorgensen – brass on "Déjame Entrar"
- Jene Burkert – brass on "Déjame Entrar"
- Charles David – brass on "Déjame Entrar"

== Charts ==
Chart (1995)	Peak position
Chilean Albums (AFP)	4
U.S. Billboard Top Latin Albums	6
U.S. Billboard Latin Pop Albums	2
U.S. Billboard Heatseekers Albums	22

== Sales and certifications ==
Region	Certification	Certified units/sales
Argentina (CAPIF)	Platinum	60,000^{^}
Chile (IFPI Chile)	4× Platinum	117,000
Mexico (AMPROFON)	2× Platinum+2× Gold	700,000^{‡}
Spain (PROMUSICAE)	Gold	50,000^{^}
United States (RIAA)	Gold	303,000
^{^} Shipments figures based on certification alone.^{‡} Sales+streaming figures based on certification alone.
