= Hechicera =

Single by Maná

from the album Sueños Líquidos
- Released: December 13, 1997
- Recorded: Conway Studios in Los Angeles, Ca, Ocean Way Recording Hollywood, Ca and Puerta Azul-Mobile Puerto Vallarta, Mexico
- Genre: Latin Rock / Pop rock
- Length: 4:58
- Label: WEA Latina
- Songwriters: Fher Olvera & Alex González
- Producers: Fher Olvera & Alex González

Maná singles chronology
"Clavado En Un Bar" (1997)	"Hechicera" (1997)	"Como Dueles En Los Labios" (1998)

"Hechicera" (English: Sorceress) is the second radio single and the first track from Maná's fifth studio album, Sueños Líquidos in 1997. On the week of December 13, 1997, the song debuted and lasted only one week at the number thirty-six spot on the U.S. Billboard Hot Latin Tracks. It was nominated for a Lo Nuestro Award for Video of the Year.

== Charts ==
Chart (1997)	Peak position
US Billboard Hot Latin Tracks	36
US Billboard Latin Pop Airplay	15
US Billboard Latin Tropical/Salsa Airplay	17
