= Oye Mi Amor =

1992 single by Maná

Single by Maná

from the album ¿Dónde Jugarán los Niños?
- Released: 7 September 1992
- Genre: Latin rock
- Length: 4:23
- Label: WEA Latina
- Songwriters: Fher Olvera; Alex González
- Producers: Fher; Alex González; José Quintana

Maná singles chronology
"Perdido en un Barco" (1991)	"Oye Mi Amor" (1992)	"De Pies a Cabeza" (1993)

Music video
- "Oye Mi Amor" on YouTube

"Oye Mi Amor" is a song recorded by Mexican pop-rock band Maná. It was released to WEA Latina as the first single of the band's third studio album, ¿Dónde Jugarán los Niños? (1992). The song peaked at number 32 on the Billboard Latin Pop Airplay chart on its 29 April 2000 issue, and charted for two weeks.

On 11 June 2026, Maná performed "Oye Mi Amor" at the opening ceremony of the 2026 FIFA World Cup.

== Charts ==
Chart performance for "Oye Mi Amor"
Chart (1993)	Peak position
Mexico (UPI)	5
Peru (UPI)	6

Chart (2000)	Peak position
US Latin Pop Airplay (Billboard)	32

Chart (2026)	Peak position
Mexico (Billboard)	8
Peru (Billboard)	23
US Latin Digital Song Sales (Billboard)	12

== Certifications ==
Certifications and sales for "Oye Mi Amor"
Region	Certification	Certified units/sales
Spain (Promusicae)	Gold	30,000^{‡}
United States (RIAA)	3× Diamond (Latin)	1,800,000^{‡}
^{‡} Sales+streaming figures based on certification alone.

== Dua Lipa version ==
"Oye Mi Amor"

Promotional single by Dua Lipa featuring Fher

from the album Live from Mexico
- Released: 14 May 2026
- Venue: Estadio GNP Seguros (Mexico City)
- Length: 5:03
- Label: Warner
- Songwriters: Fher Olvera; Alex González

Music video
- "Oye Mi Amor" (live from Mexico) on YouTube

English singer Dua Lipa performed a cover of the song with Fher of Maná during a show of her Radical Optimism Tour at Estadio GNP Seguros in Mexico City on 2 December 2025. The live performance was included in her second live album, Live from Mexico (2026). The song was released as a digital promotional single on 14 May 2026 and serviced to Latin American radio.

=== Charts ===
Weekly chart performance for "Oye Mi Amor"
Chart (2026)	Peak position
Argentina Hot 100 (Billboard)	26
Argentina Airplay (Monitor Latino)	19
Chile Pop Airplay (Monitor Latino)	14
Uruguay Pop Airplay (Monitor Latino)	16
Venezuela Airplay (Monitor Latino)	19
