= No Ha Parado de Llover =

Single by Maná

from the album Cuando los Ángeles Lloran
- Released: 1995
- Studio: Record Plant Studios, Hollywood, California
- Genre: Latin rock
- Length: 5:23
- Label: WEA Latina
- Songwriters: Fher Olvera; Alex González
- Producers: Fher Olvera; Alex González; Jose L. Quintana

Maná singles chronology
"Déjame Entrar" (1995)	"No Ha Parado de Llover" (1995)	"Como un Perro Enloquecido" (1996)

Music video
- "No ha parado de llover" on YouTube

"No Ha Parado de Llover" (English: "It Has Not Stopped Raining") is a song from Mexican band Maná's fourth studio album Cuando los Ángeles Lloran (1995). The song was written by band members Fher Olvera and Alex González, who handled production alongside Jose L. Quintana. It was released as the second single from the album in 1995. A Latin rock ballad, its lyrics deal with the singer unable to move on from his former lover. Commercially, the song peaked at number eight on the Hot Latin Songs chart and number one on the Latin Pop Airplay chart in the United States. A music video was directed by Gustavo Garzón and features the band performing the song shirtless. It was a recipient at the ASCAP Latin Awards in 1996.

In 2019, Maná re-recorded "No Ha Parado de Llover" with Colombian singer Sebastián Yatra with new musical arrangements. The collaboration came about when the band heard Yatra perform the song live in 2018. At the 2021 Lo Nuestro Awards, it was nominated in the category of Pop Song of the Year. This version reached the top five on the Monitor Latino pop charts in the Dominican Republic and Mexico and number 23 on the Latin Pop Airplay chart in the US. The video for the new version was directed by Pablo Croce where it narrates two different protagonists going through loss.

== Background and composition ==
In 1992, Maná released their third studio album ¿Dónde Jugarán los Niños? which led to the band's popularity in the Latin rock music scene. It was followed up with their live album Maná en Vivo in 1994. The band's lineup went through a change when its lead guitarist César "Vampiro" López and keyboardist Iván González left the group due to personal disputes. López was replaced by Sergio Vallín.

In April 1995, Maná released their fourth studio album Cuando los Ángeles Lloran with its pop rock musical style being similar to ¿Dónde Jugarán los Niños?. The tracks in the record were written and produced by lead vocalist Fher Olvera and drummer Alex González including "No Ha Parado de Llover" and both worked on its production alongside Jose L. Quintana. The song is a Latin rock ballad in which the singer deals with "losing a loved one and having many unanswered questions in the process".

== Promotion and reception ==
"No Ha Parado de Llover" was released as the second single from the album in 1995. The music video for the song was directed by Gustavo Garzón, and features the band shirtless singing under the rain. According to Billboard's Jessica Roiz, other scenes from the video include "an ex-couple reminiscing on their times together, a slithering snake, religious statues crying tears of blood, and Fher breaking a mirror with a phone". On the review of the album, John Lannert of Billboard referred "No Ha Parado de Llover" and "Hundido en un Rincón" as a "pair of doleful narratives of forsaken love". The track was recognized as one of the best-performing songs of the year at the 1996 ASCAP Latin Awards. In the US, "No Ha Parado de Llover" peaked at number eight on the Billboard Hot Latin Songs chart and reached the top of the Latin Pop Airplay chart. Two live versions of the track were included on the albums MTV Unplugged (1999) and Arde el Cielo (2008).

== 2019 version ==
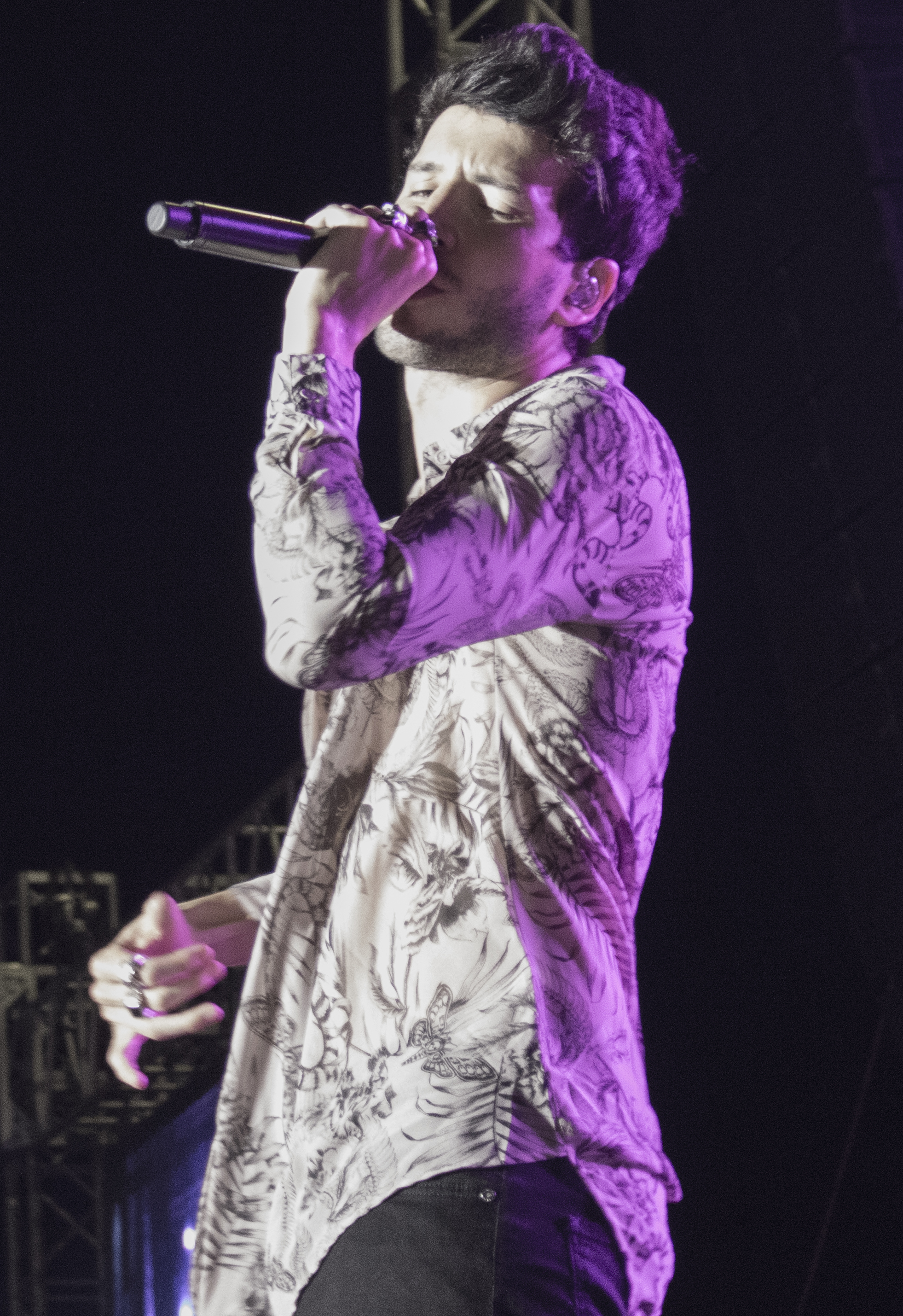
Maná collaborated with Colombian singer Sebastián Yatra (pictured) to record a new version of "No Ha Parado de Llover".

In 2019, Maná re-recorded "No Ha Parado de Llover" with Colombian singer Sebastián Yatra. It features a new musical arrangement and according to Roiz, incorporates Yatra's "pop essence" with Maná's "rock melodies". The idea for the collaboration was inspired by Yatra's live rendition of the song during the Latin Recording Academy Person of the Year gala in 2018, where the band was honored with the accolade. At the 33rd Annual Lo Nuestro Awards in 2021, it was nominated for Pop Song of the Year, but lost to "ADMV" by Maluma.

"No Ha Parado de Llover" peaked at number four and two on the Monitor Latino pop charts in the Dominican Republic and Mexico, respectively. On its initial run, the 2019 version reached number 32 and spent ten weeks on the Billboard Latin Pop Airplay chart in the US. On the week ending 15 August 2020, Billboard revised the methodology for the Latin Pop Airplay chart to only track Latin pop songs being played on Latin radio stations in the country. As a result, "No Ha Parado de Llover" re-entered the chart and peaked at number 23.

=== Music video ===
The music video for the 2019 version of "No Ha Parado de Llover" was filmed in Los Angeles, California and directed by Pablo Croce. It narrates two people who are going through loss. The first is a woman who loses her friend in a car crash from texting while driving and the second is a man who discovers his girlfriend cheating on him. This leads the man to attempt suicide, but is stopped by the woman who was led by a butterfly, representing her friend's spirit, and both begin to heal together. At the end of the video, a message reads: "The use of cell phones at the wheel is one of the leading causes of death today." Within a week of its release, it received over 3.5 million views on YouTube. The video received a nomination for "Video With a Purpose" at the 2020 Premios Juventud.

== Charts ==
=== Weekly charts ===
Chart performance for "No Ha Parado de Llover"
Chart (1995)	Peak position
US Hot Latin Songs (Billboard)	8
US Latin Pop Airplay (Billboard)	1

Chart performance for "No Ha Parado de Llover" (duet)
Chart (2020)	Peak position
Dominican Republic Pop (Monitor Latino)	4
Mexico Pop (Monitor Latino)	2
US Latin Pop Airplay (Billboard)	23

=== Year-end charts ===
2020 year-end chart performance for "No Ha Parado de Llover" (duet)
Chart (2020)	Position
Dominican Republic Pop (Monitor Latino)	43

== Certifications ==
Certifications for "No Ha Parado de Llover"
Region	Certification	Certified units/sales
United States (RIAA) Duet version	Platinum (Latin)	60,000^{‡}
^{‡} Sales+streaming figures based on certification alone.

== See also ==
- List of Billboard Latin Pop Airplay number ones of 1994 and 1995
