= En el muelle de San Blas =

"En el Muelle de San Blas"

Single by Maná

from the album Sueños Líquidos
- Released: May 23, 1998; January 6, 2001 (Maxi-Single 4 Track)
- Recorded: Conway Studios in Los Angeles, Calif, Ocean Way Recording Hollywood, Ca and Puerta Azul-Mobile Puerto Vallarta, Mexico
- Genre: Latin rock
- Length: 5:51
- Label: WEA Latina
- Songwriters: Fher Olvera and Alex González
- Producers: Fher Olvera and Alex González

Maná singles chronology
"Como Dueles En Los Labios" (1998)	"En el Muelle de San Blas" (1998)	"Como Te Extraño Corazón" (1998)

"En el muelle de San Blas" (English: "At the pier of San Blas") is the fourth radio single and eighth track off of Maná's fifth studio album, Sueños Líquidos (1997). In the week of May 23, 1998, the song debuted and reached number eighteen on the U.S. Billboard Hot Latin Tracks. It stayed for a total of six weeks.

The song was inspired by Rebeca Méndez Jiménez, a woman in Nayarit, Mexico. In 1971 she said goodbye to her fiancé Manuel, a foreign fisherman she was set to marry four days later. As he was returning from his fishing trip, the storm Priscilla struck the area, possibly killing him, though his body was never found. Rebeca Méndez Jiménez waited for him for 41 years (1971–2012) at the pier of San Blas. She was nicknamed the “Loca del Muelle de San Blas” by the locals because she often dressed as a bride.

In 1997, Fernando Olvera, the lead singer of the group Maná, visited the pier, crossed paths with Rebeca, asked her about her story, and decided to turn it into a song. Méndez Jiménez died on September 16, 2012, at the age of 63, still waiting for Manuel who never returned.

The authorities of Nayarit have built a statue of her at the San Blas Port to commemorate her story. This has made the port a popular tourist destination, attracting visitors from different parts of Mexico and Latin America.

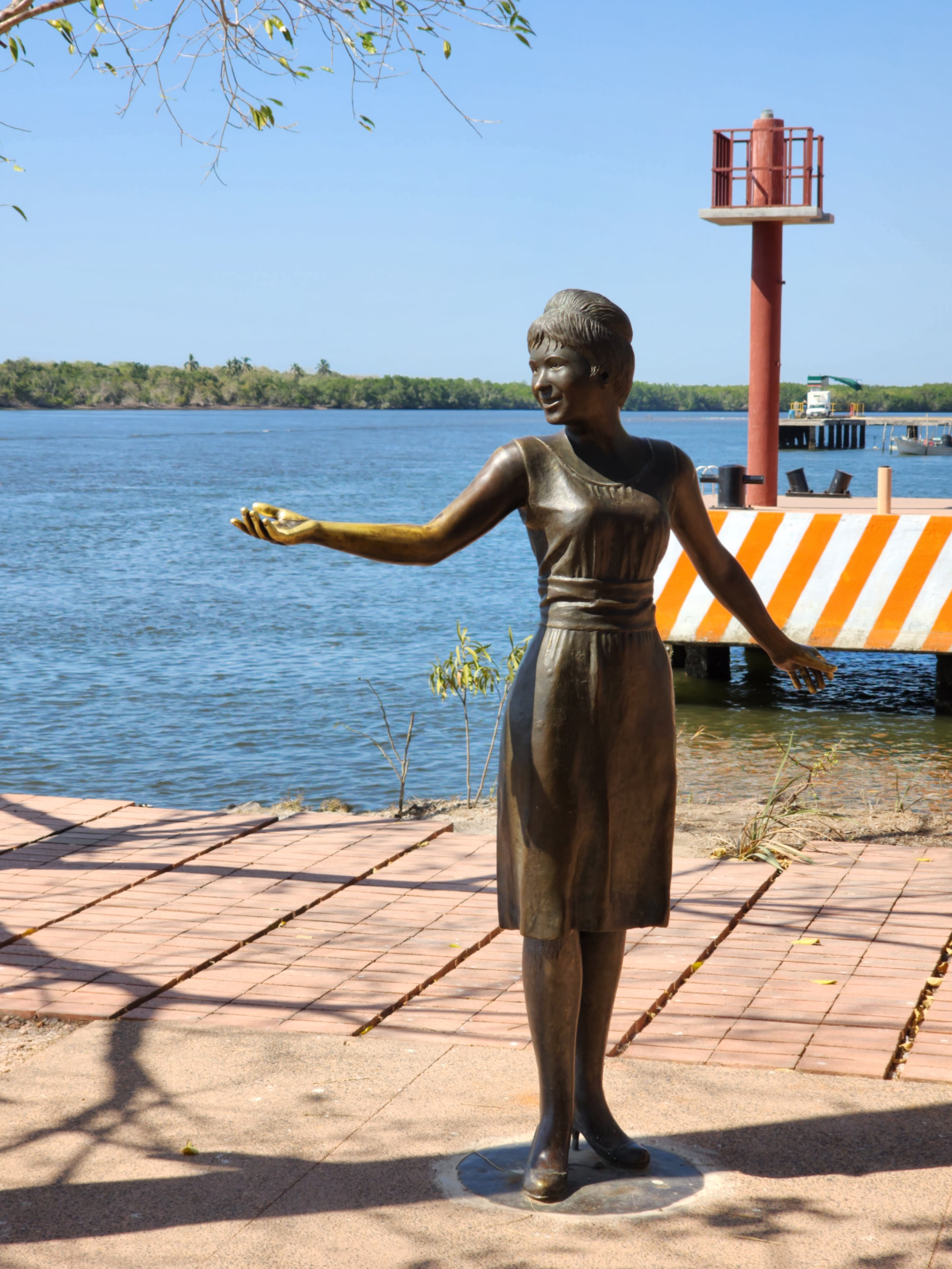
Statue of Rebeca Méndez Jiménez at the San Blas port.

== Charts ==
Chart (1998)	Peak position
Guatemala (Notimex)	4
Honduras (Notimex)	1
Nicaragua (Notimex)	1
US Hot Latin Songs (Billboard)	18
US Latin Pop Airplay (Billboard)	18
US Tropical Airplay (Billboard)	19

== Certifications ==
Region	Certification	Certified units/sales
United States (RIAA)	16× Platinum (Latin)	960,000^{‡}
^{‡} Sales+streaming figures based on certification alone.
