= Fher Olvera =

Mexican musician and songwriter (born 1959)

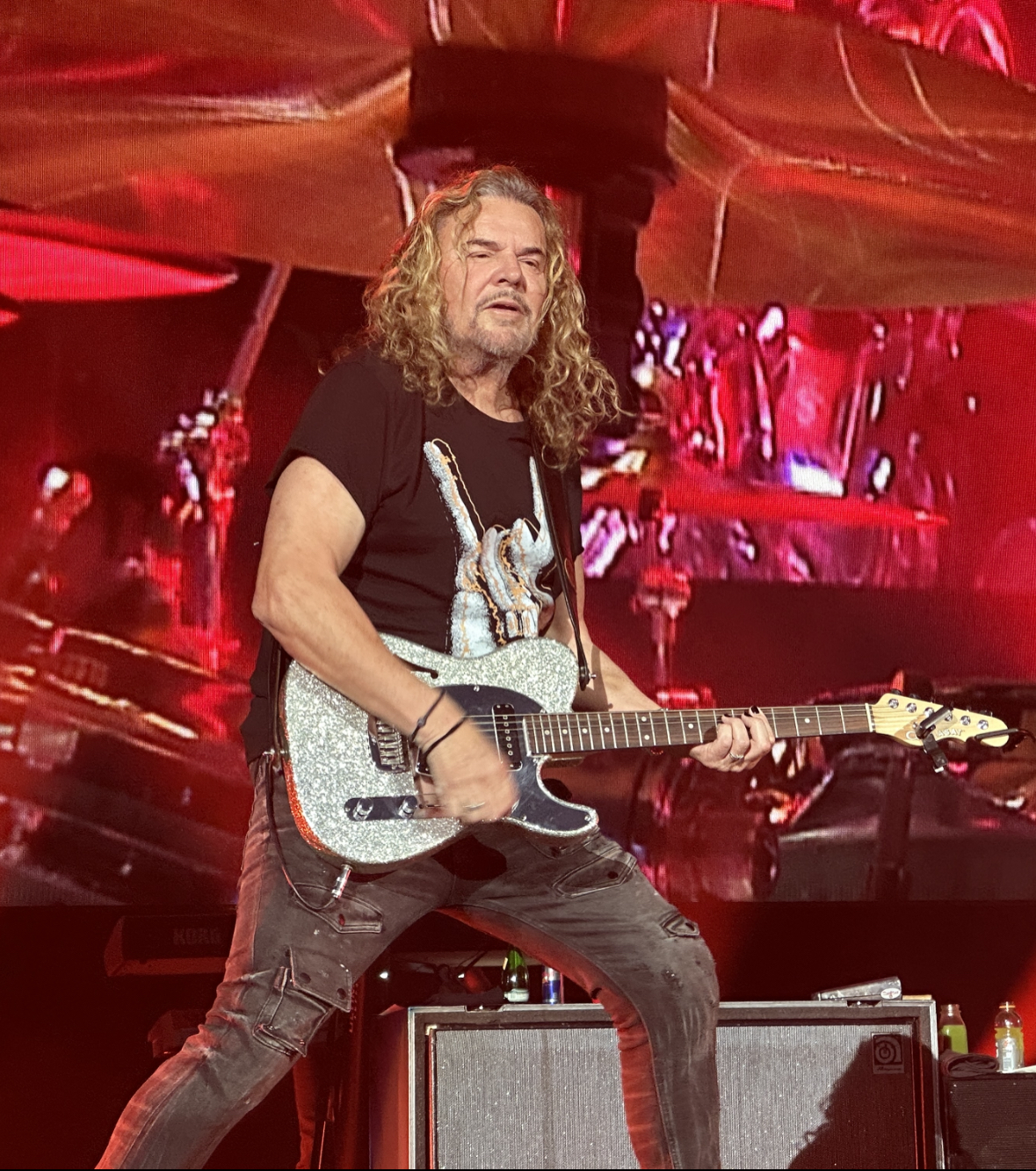
- Olvera performing in Denver, 2023

Background information
- Also known as: Fher; Fernando Olvera
- Born: José Fernando Emilio Olvera Sierra; 8 December 1959 (age 66); Puebla, Mexico
- Genre: Rock
- Occupations: Singer; songwriter; musician; activist; philanthropist
- Instruments: Vocals; guitar; harmonica
- Years active: 1978–present
- Label: Warner Music México
- Website: www.mana.com.mx

Signature
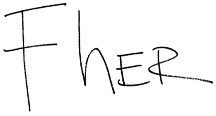

José Fernando Emilio "Fher" Olvera Sierra (born 8 December 1959) is a Mexican musician and songwriter who is the secondary guitarist, composer and lead singer of the rock band Maná.

== Biography ==
=== Early career ===
Born José Fernando Emilio Olvera, he began his musical career as a teenager in Guadalajara, playing alongside Gustavo Orozco and brothers Ulises, Juan Diego, and Abraham Calleros. Together, they formed a band called Sombrero Verde in the early 1980s.

=== Maná ===
With Abraham Calleros and Gustavo Orozco switching interests, Olvera continued his musical trajectory with the Calleros, Juan Diego (bass), Ulises (lead guitar) and himself (vocals and backup guitar), and a new member: Alejandro González (drums). The band recreated itself with a new name in 1987: Maná. The current members are:

- Fher Olvera — lead vocals, electric guitar, acoustic guitar, rhythm guitar, harmonica.
- Alex González — drums, backup vocals.
- Juan Calleros — bass, acoustic bass guitar.
- Sergio Vallín — electric guitar, acoustic guitar.

== Personal life ==
Olvera's father died when he was 7 years old. His mother died when he was making the album Drama y Luz. Olvera has a child, Dalí, with his ex-girlfriend Ana Ivette Verduzco. He later had a 4-year relationship with TV host Monica Noguera. He keeps a close relationship with fellow band members, especially with Ulises Calleros and Alex González.

He made an appearance in Coldplay's 2022 Tour Music of the spheres singing "Rayando el Sol" along with the Coldplay members in the Akron Stadium in Guadalajara, Jalisco on 29 March 2022.
