= Alex González (musician) =

American musician

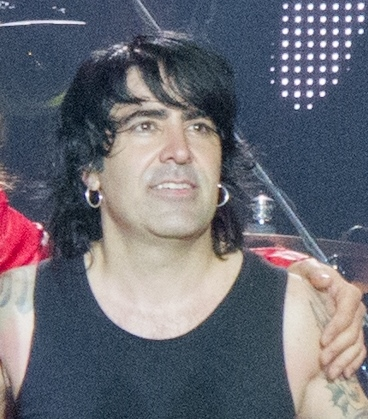
- González in 2012

Background information
- Also known as: El Animal
- Born: Alejandro González Trujillo; February 24, 1969 (age 57); Miami, Florida, United States
- Genres: Rock
- Occupations: Musician; songwriter
- Instrument: Drums
- Years active: 1980–present
- Website: www.mana.com.mx; www.delatierramusic.com

Alejandro González Trujillo (born February 24, 1969) is an American musician. He is the main drummer and songwriter for the Mexican band Maná and metal band De La Tierra. He is nicknamed "El Animal" and has sung lead vocals on several songs, such as "Me Vale". González discovered his passion for playing the drums at the young age of 5 when he caught the attention of a kindergarten teacher who gave him a red sparkle drumkit. He took to the instrument very seriously and found himself a teacher shortly thereafter.

By age fifteen, González was in Maná who had their first hit in 1992 with their album ¿Dónde Jugarán Los Niños?, which was certified gold in the U.S. González cites influences such as Ringo Starr, John Bonham, Keith Moon, Stewart Copeland, Neil Peart and Terry Bozzio.

Maná has been a big part of the Rock En Español phenomenon in the United States. They began playing in the United States in 1993 and influenced other bands with their success to play in the U.S., too. González is quoted as saying, "I think it's incredible that Spanish language bands like ours can sell millions of albums and sell out arenas in the U.S. It's also cool to see how many “anglos” are now getting hooked on our music." His talent has been featured in Modern Drummer Magazine, Drummerworld, Drum, among others. He performs exclusively with DW Drums (formerly has used Pearl Drums), Remo, Paiste and Vic Firth.
