= Natalia Jiménez =

Spanish singer (born 1981)

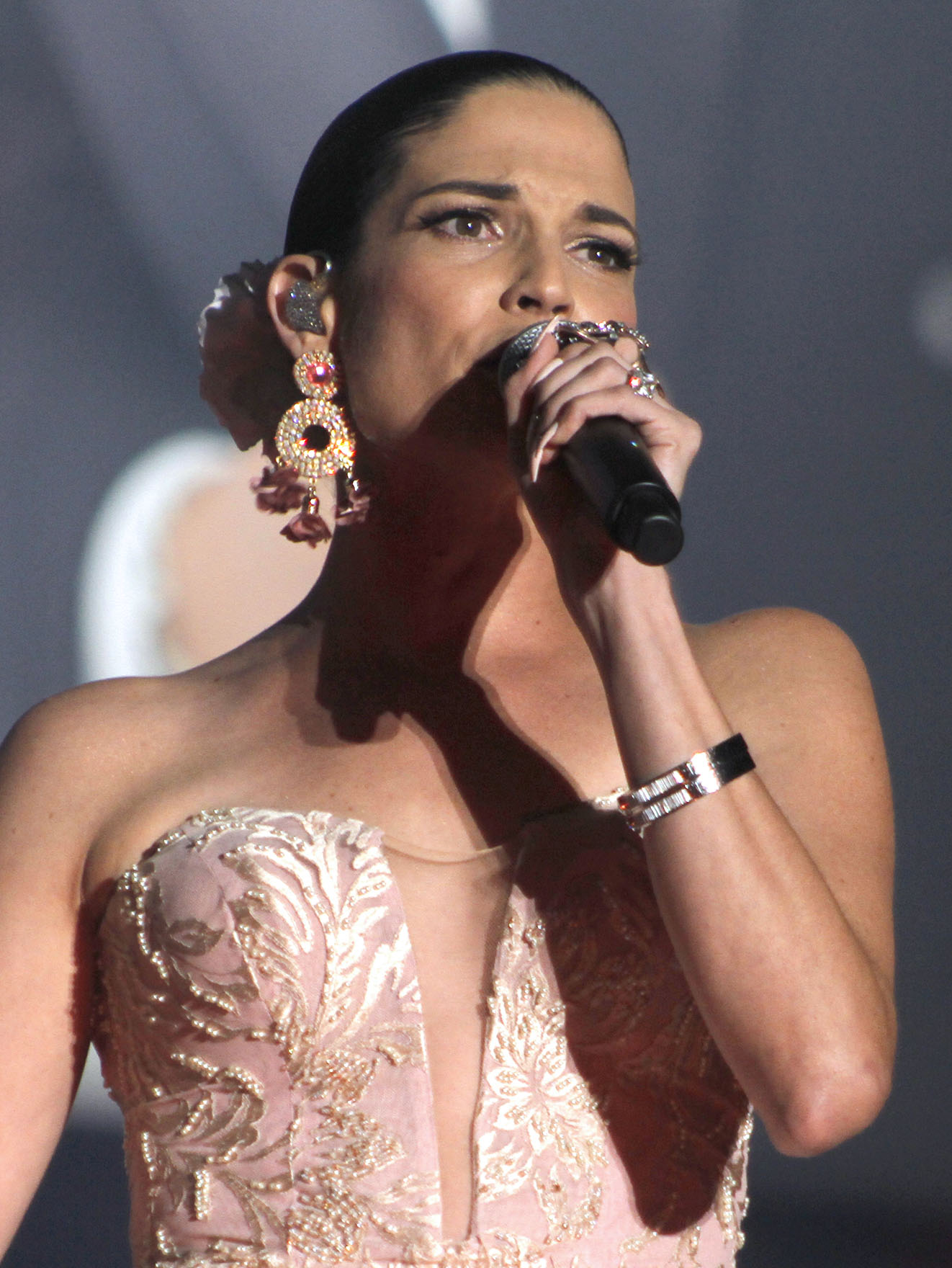
- Jiménez in 2019

Background information
- Born: Natalia Altea Jiménez Sarmento; 29 December 1981 (age 44); Madrid, Spain
- Genres: Pop; Latin pop; mariachi; regional Mexican; rock
- Occupation: Singer
- Instrument: Vocals
- Years active: 2000–present
- Label: Sony Latin
- Member of: La 5ª Estación
- Website: www.nataliajimenezmusic.com

Natalia Altea Jiménez Sarmento (born 29 December 1981) is a Spanish singer who started her musical career in the 2000s as vocalist of La Quinta Estación. Her first disc as a soloist was titled Natalia Jiménez. She has received Grammy and Latin Grammy Awards and has sold more than 3 million albums worldwide, during her solo career. She has recorded duets with the main stars of Latin music, including Marc Anthony, Daddy Yankee and Ricky Martin among others.

== Career ==
Jimenez began her career playing in the subway and on the streets of Madrid at age 15.

In 2001, she signed an agreement with BMG Entertainment and became the lead singer of La Quinta Estación, with which she managed to achieve success in Spain, Mexico and the United States thanks to the albums Flores de Alquiler, El Mundo Se Equivoca y Sin Frenos.

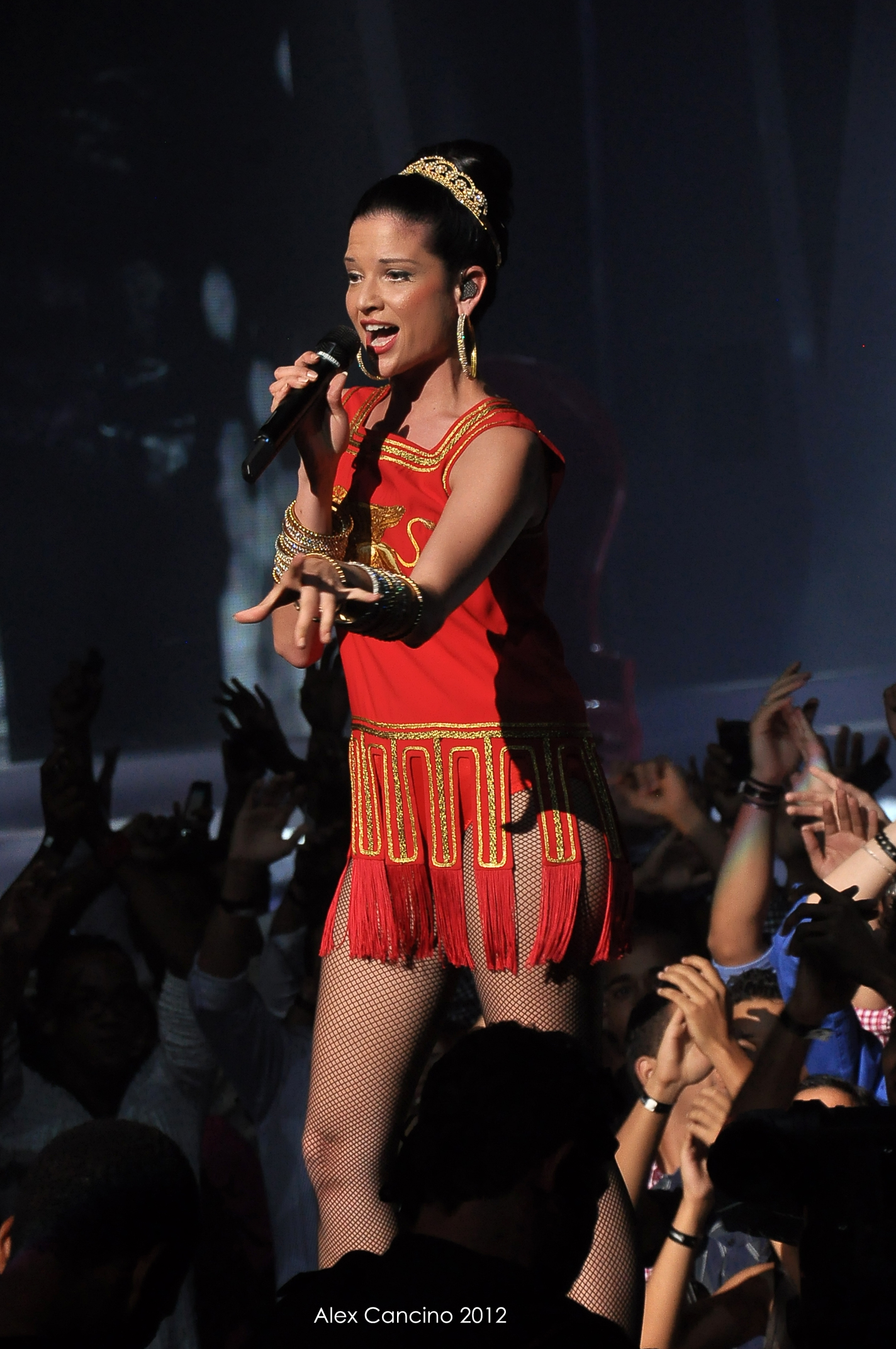
Natalia Jiménez participating in the 2012 Premios Casandra, Santo Domingo

After living in Mexico for more than eight years, Natalia moved to Miami to devote time to an album on which she debuted as a soloist, Natalia Jiménez, released on 21 June 2011. The album debuted at the number one position on the iTunes Latin Pop list and with it, the singer received the “Female artist of the year” nomination for the Billboard Latin Music Awards. In early 2012 she won the Premio Lo Nuestro for "Revelation of the year ".

Her second solo album, Creo en Mi, was released on 17 March 2015 and reached the number one position in Puerto Rico and number two on the Billboard Latin Albums chart. In addition, she received two Latin Grammy nominations in the categories Album of the Year ("Creo en mí") and Song of the year ("Quédate con ella").

In 2016, Jiménez celebrated the work of the Mexican-American diva, Jenni Rivera, in her third solo album: Tributo a la gran señora.

In 2019, she released the single "Nunca Es Tarde", which she recorded with Jesús Navarro, vocalist of Reik, and composed with Claudia Brant and Jayson DeZuzio. The same theme became the main song of the second season of the Televisa and Univision serie, Amar Sin Ley.

In August 2019, Jiménez released an album of rancheras entitled México de mi corazón, produced by Armando Ávila. In seven months, the material reached the top positions in the lists of musical successes in Mexico and the United States, and it has earned it a Gold Record and more than 55 million reproductions worldwide.

México de mi corazón is an album that honors the Mexican song and features duets with voices such as Carlos Rivera, Pedro Fernández, Paquita la del Barrio, Lila Downs, El Bebeto and Banda MS. Mariachi Gama Mil provides musical accompaniment, and Natalia was granted permission to incorporate choirs with Juan Gabriel.

Jiménez served as coach for three seasons of La Voz Kids USA, where she won twice and also as coach of La Voz...Mexico. In 2020, Natalia returned to Spain where she served as judge of the reality show Operación Triunfo.. In 2021, she was on the Colombian Kids and Senior version of La Voz, winning both of the series. She is currently tied with the 2nd most wins female coach on The Voice, same as Sarah Geronimo, Kelly Clarkson and Pelageya on Philippine, American and Russian series.

== Personal life ==
Natalia Jiménez was born on 29 December 1981 in Madrid to a Spanish father and Portuguese mother (who were both musicians).

In 2009, Jiménez had a wedding scheduled with her fiancé, businessman Antonio Alcol. The wedding was canceled and the couple broke up.

In 2016, Jiménez announced her surprise wedding with Daniel Trueba. She has a daughter, Alessandra, from that Marriage who was born on 21 October 2016. On 8 January 2021, she announced the divorce from that relationship and that they had been separated for several months.

Natalia is engaged to her fiancé and manager Arnold Hemkes. Jiménez resides between Miami, Florida and Mexico City, Mexico with frequent visits to her family in Madrid.

== Discography ==
=== Studio albums ===
Title	Album details	Billboard			Sales	Certifications
Title	Album details	Billboard 200	Top Latin Albums	Latin Pop Albums	Sales	Certifications
Natalia Jiménez	Released: 20 June 2011; Formats: CD, digital	—	4	—	US: 3,000	
Creo en Mi	Released: 17 March 2015; Formats: CD, digital	157	2	2	US: 4,000	
Homenaje a La Gran Señora	Released: 9 December 2016; Formats: CD, digital	—	2	2		
México de Mi Corazón	Released: 30 August 2019; Formats: CD, download, streaming	—	—	—		AMPROFON: Platinum; RIAA: Gold (Latin)
México de Mi Corazón, Vol. 2	Released: September 10, 2021; Formats: CD, download, streaming	—	—	—		

=== Studio albums with La Quinta Estacion ===
Year	Title	Chart positions			Sales/certifications
Year	Title	United States	Mexico	Spain	Sales/certifications
2001	Primera Toma: 1st studio album; Released: 3 December 2001; Formats: CD	—	—	—	
2004	Flores de Alquiler: 2nd studio album; Released: 22 June 2004; Formats: CD, digital	7	5	—	AMPROFON: Platinum+Gold; RIAA: 2× Platinum (Latin)
2006	El Mundo Se Equivoca: 3rd studio album; Released: 22 August 2006; Formats: CD, digital	13	4	3	AMPROFON: Platinum+Gold; PROMUSICAE: 2× Platinum; RIAA: Platinum (Latin)
2009	Sin Frenos: 4th studio album; Released: 17 March 2009; Formats: CD, digital	1	3	2	AMPROFON: Gold; PROMUSICAE: Gold

=== Compilations and live albums ===
Year	Title	Chart positions			Sales/certifications
Year	Title	United States	Mexico	Spain	Sales/certifications
2005	Acústico: 1st live album; Released: 1 November 2005; Formats: CD/DVD	28	—	—	AMPROFON: Platinum
2007	La Quinta Estación (La Caja): Greatest hits collection; Released: 27 November 2007; Formats: CD, digital	—	—	—	

Footnotes:

- ^{1} Based on the Billboard Top Latin Albums chart.

=== Special appearances ===
- 2002 – Clase 406 soundtrack
- 2002 – Tributo a los Hombres G
- 2003 – Dame Tu Cuerpo soundtrack
- 2006 – Now Esto Es Musica! Latino
- 2015 – La Voz Kids
- 2018 – La Voz... México

=== Singles ===
As a solo artist:

Title	Year	Billboard			Certifications	Album
Title	Year	Hot Latin Songs	Latin Airplay	Latin Pop Songs	Certifications	Album
"Por Ser Tu Mujer"	2011	36	36	19		Natalia Jiménez
"Creo en Mi"	2014	12	4	2	AMPROFON: 2× Diamond; RIAA: 8× Platinum (Latin)	Creo en Mi
"Quédate Con Ella"	2015	17	8	4		Creo en Mi
"Algo Brilla en Mi"	2015	44	19	13		Creo en Mi
"Querida Socia"	2017	—	40	22		Homenaje a la Gran Señora
"Una Mentira Más" (with Yuri)	2019	—	—	—		Non-album single
"Qué Bueno Es Tenerte"	2021	—	—	—	RIAA: Gold (Latin)	México de Mi Corazón, Vol. 2

with La Quinta Estación:

Year	Single	Peak chart positions						Certifications	Album
Year	Single	HLT	LPA	MEX	SPA	PER	CAL	Certifications	Album
2002	"Dónde Irán"	—	—	11	—	—	30		Primera Toma
2002	"Perdición"	24	6	—	—	—	37		Primera Toma
2003	"No Quiero Perderte"	—	—	—	—	—	—		Primera Toma
2004	"El Sol No Regresa"	37	21	3	19	—	5		Flores de Alquiler
2005	"Algo Más"	3	2	1	32	—	1		Flores de Alquiler
2005	"Daría"	13	3	4	15	—	11		Flores de Alquiler
2005	"Niña"	—	36	9	—	—	22		Flores de Alquiler
2006	"Tu Peor Error"	18	17	1	16	64	16	AMPROFON: Gold	El Mundo Se Equivoca
2006	"Me Muero"	10	2	1	1	3	1	AMPROFON: Platinum; PROMUSICAE: 6× Platinum	El Mundo Se Equivoca
2007	"Sueños Rotos"	—	27	6	1	—	8		El Mundo Se Equivoca
2007	"Ahora Que Te Vas"	26	6	—	—	60	—		El Mundo Se Equivoca
2008	"La Frase Tonta De La Semana"	—	—	73	—	—	8		El Mundo Se Equivoca
2009	"Que te Quería"	4	1	1	1	—	10	PROMUSICAE: Platinum	Sin Frenos
2009	"Recuérdame" (featuring Marc Anthony)	5	3	4	8	—	12	PROMUSICAE: 2× Platinum	Sin Frenos
2009	"Me Dueles"	—	—	—	—	—	—		Sin Frenos

=== Featured singles ===
Year	Single	Peak chart positions					Certifications	Album
Year	Single	HLT	LPA	LTA	MEX	SPA	Certifications	Album
2008	"No" (Ednita Nazario featuring Natalia Jiménez)	—	22	—	—	—	—	Real
2010	"Lo Mejor De Mi Vida Eres Tu" (Ricky Martin featuring Natalia Jiménez)	1	1	28	3	27	—	Música + Alma + Sexo
2013	"La Noche De Los Dos" (Daddy Yankee featuring Natalia Jiménez)	19	6	19	—	—	—	Prestige

== Awards and nominations ==
With La Quinta Estación
Year	Award	Category	Result
2004	MTV Latinoamérica Awards	Best New Artist – Mexico	Nominee
2005	Orgullosamente Latino Awards	Latino Group of the Year	Won
2006	Oye! Awards	Best Spanish Group	Nominee
2006	Premio Lo Nuestro	Best Group or Duo of the Year	Nominee
2006	Billboard Awards	Latin Pop Album, Duo or Group	Nominee
2006	Billboard Awards	Latin Pop Airplay of the Year, Duo or Group	Nominee
2006	Billboard Awards	Latin Pop Airplay of the Year, New Artist	Won
2006	Latin Grammy	Best Pop Vocal Album Duet or Group	Nominee
2007	40 Principales Awards	Best Music Video Clip	Nominee
2007	40 Principales Awards	Best Song	Won
2007	40 Principales Awards	Best Album	Won
2007	40 Principales Awards	Revelation Artist	Won
2007	Orgullosamente Latino Awards	Latino Group of the Year	Nominee
2007	Ondas Award	Best Latin Video	Won
2007	Ondas Award	Best Latino Group	Won
2007	Latin Grammy	Best Pop Vocal Album Duet or Group	Won
2007	Amigo Awards	Best-Selling Revelation Artist	Won
2007	Amigo Awards	Best-Selling Spanish Artist	Nominee
2007	MTV Europa Awards	Best Spanish Artist	Nominee
2007	Premio Lo Nuestro	Best Group or Duo of the Year	Won
2007	Premio Lo Nuestro	Best Pop Vocal Album Duet or Group	Won
2008	Orgullosamente Latino Awards	Latin Song of the Year	Nominee
2008	Awards Orgullosamente Latino	Latino Group of the Year	Nominee
2008	Billboard Awards	Latin Pop Airplay of the Year, Duo or Group	Nominee
2008	Premio Lo Nuestro	Best Song	Nominee
2008	Premio Lo Nuestro	Best Group or Duo of the Year	Nominee
2009	People en Español Awards	Collaboration of the Year (for "Recuérdame" with Marc Anthony)	Nominee
2009	People en Español Award	Best Pop Singer or Group	Nominee
2009	40 Principales Awards	Best Album	Nominee
2009	40 Principales Awards	Best Group or Duo	Nominee
2009	Awards Hey!	Best Spanish Pop Group	Won
2009	Orgullosamente Latino Awards	Latino Group of the Year	Nominee
2009	Grammy	Best Latin Pop Album	Won
2010	Billboard Awards	Latin Pop Album, Artist of the Year, Duo or Group	Won
2010	Premio Lo Nuestro	Best Group or Duo of the Year	Won
2010	Premio Lo Nuestro	Album of the Year	Won
2010	Latin Grammy	Best Pop Duo or Group Vocal Album	Won

As soloist
Year	Award	Category	Result
2011	Latin Grammy	Collaboration of the Year for "Lo Mejor de mi Vida Eres Tú" with Ricky Martin	Nominee
2011	Latin Grammy	Song of the Year for "Lo Mejor de mi Vida Eres Tú" with Ricky Martin	Nominee
2012	Premios Lo Nuestro	Female Artist of the Year	Nominee
2012	Premio Lo Nuestro	Breakthrough Soloist or Group of the Year	Won
2012	Oye! Awards	Pop Revelation	Nominee
2012	Premio Casandra Internacional	Outstanding foreign artists in the Dominican Republic	Won
2012	– Latin Billboard Awards	Female Artist of the Year, Album	Nominee
2013	La Musa Elena Casals Award	Outstanding young songwriter in the Latin industry	Won
2015	Latin Billboard Awards	Female Artist of the Year	Won
2014	Neox Fan Awards	This is my song "Creo En Mí"	Won
2015	ASCAP Award	Composers Award for the theme "Creo En Mí"	Won
2016	Premio Lo Nuestro	Female Artist of the Year	Won

Year	Category	Title of Work	Result
2012	Breakout Artist or Duo of the Year	Natalia Jiménez	Won

=== Latin Billboard Music Awards ===
Year	Category	Title of work	Result
2015	Hot Latin Songs Artist of the Year, Female	Natalia Jiménez	Won
