= 2006 Latin Billboard Music Awards =

Annual American music awards ceremony

2006 Billboard Latin Music Awards
- Date: April 27, 2006
- Venue: Seminole Hard Rock Hotel & Casino, Hollywood, Florida

The 2006 Billboard Latin Music Awards, produced and broadcast lived on Telemundo, were held on Thursday, April 27, 2006. The award show aired on Telemundo at 8pm EST. The awards show and after party were held at the Hard Rock Live in Hollywood, Florida.

== Hot Latin Songs of the Year ==
=== Hot Latin Song of the Year ===
- Mayor Que Yo – Baby Ranks, Daddy Yankee, Tonny Tun Tun, Wisin, Yandel, & Héctor el Father (Mas Flow/Machete)
- La Camisa Negra – Juanes (Surco/Universal Latino)
- La Tortura – Shakira featuring Alejandro Sanz (Epic/Sony BMG Norte)
- Rakata – Wisin & Yandel (Mas Flow/Machete)

=== Vocal Duet or Collaboration ===
- Ella y Yo – Aventura feat. Don Omar (Premium Latin)
- Mayor Que Yo – Baby Ranks, Daddy Yankee, Tonny Tun Tun, Wisin, Yandel, & Héctor el Father (Mas Flow/Machete)
- Obsesion (No Es Amor) – Aventura & Frankie J feat. Baby Bash (Columbia/Sony BMG Norte)
- La Tortura – Shakira feat. Alejandro Sanz (Epic/Sony BMG Norte)

=== Artist of the Year ===
- Daddy Yankee
- Juanes
- Shakira
- Wisin & Yandel

== Latin Pop Albums ==
=== Male ===
- Adentro – Ricardo Arjona (Sony BMG Norte)
- Cautivo – Chayanne (Sony BMG Norte)
- Paso A Paso – Luis Fonsi (Universal Latino)
- En La Luna – Reyli (Sony BMG Norte)

=== Female ===
- El Sexto Sentido – Thalía (EMI Latin)
- Escucha Atento – Laura Pausini (Warner Latina)
- Fijación Oral, Vol. 1 – Shakira (Epic/Sony Music)
- Una Nueva Mujer – Olga Tañón (Sony BMG Norte)

=== Duo or Group ===
- Flores de Alquiler – La 5ª Estación (Sony BMG Norte)
- Tour Generación RBD En Vivo – RBD (EMI Latin)
- Nuestro Amor – RBD (EMI Latin)
- Rebelde – RBD (EMI Latin)

=== New Artist ===
- Flores de Alquiler – La 5ª Estación (Sony BMG Norte)
- Nuestro Amor – RBD (EMI Latin)
- Rebelde – RBD (EMI Latin)
- En la Luna – Reyli (Sony BMG Norte)

== Top Latin Albums Artist of the Year ==
- Daddy Yankee
- Juanes
- RBD
- Shakira

== Latin Rock/Alternative Album of the Year ==
- Un Viaje — Café Tacuba (Universal Latino)
- Chavez Ravine — Ry Cooder (Perro Verde/Nonesuch/Warner Bros.)
- Cronicas de un Laberinto — Jaguares (Sony BMG Norte)
- Consejo — La Secta AllStar (Universal Latino)

== Tropical Album of the Year ==
=== Male ===
- Ironía — Andy Andy (Wepa/Urban Box Office)
- Adiós Amor — Joseph Fonseca (Karen/Universal Latino)
- En Vivo Desde Carnegie Hall — Víctor Manuelle (Sony BMG Norte)
- Hoy, Mañana Y Siempre — Tito Nieves (SGZ/Univision)

=== Female ===
- Grandes Exitos — La India (Universal Latino)
- MQ — Milly Quezada (J&N/Sony BMG Norte)
- Atrévete A Olvidarme — Brenda K. Starr (Mi Voz/Boss)
- Como Olvidar: Lo Mejor de Olga Tañón — Olga Tañón (Warner Latina)

=== Duo or Group ===
- God's Project — Aventura (Premium Latin/Sony BMG Norte)
- I Love Salsa — N'Klabe (NU/Sony BMG Norte)
- Dos Soneros, Una Historia — Gilberto Santa Rosa & Víctor Manuelle (Sony BMG Norte)
- Asi Es Nuestra Navidad — Gilberto Santa Rosa & El Gran Combo (Sony BMG Norte)

=== New Artist ===
- Ironia — Andy Andy (Wepa/Urban Box Office)
- Mas Grande Que El — Elvis Martinez (Univision/UG)
- Buena Vista Social Club Presents Manuel Guajiro Mirabal — Manuel Guajiro Mirabal (World Circuit/Nonesuch/Warner Bros.)
- I Love Salsa — N'Klabe (NU/Sony BMG Norte)

== Regional Mexican Album of the Year ==
=== Male Solo Artist ===
- Mis Duetos — Vicente Fernández (Sony BMG Norte)
- El Rey De Las Cantinas — Lupillo Rivera (Univision/UG)
- Inventario — Joan Sebastian (Musart/Balboa)
- Las Dos Caras De La Moneda — Beto Terrazas (Sony BMG Norte)

=== Male Duo or Group ===
- Y Sigue La Mata Dando — Grupo Montéz de Durango (Disa)
- X — Intocable (EMI Latin)
- Mas Capaces Que Nunca — K-Paz de la Sierra (Disa)
- Divinas — Patrulla 81 (Disa)

=== Female Group or Female Solo Artist ===
- Confesiones — Ana Bárbara & Jennifer Peña (Fonovisa/UG)
- Y Seguimos Con Duranguense — Los Horóscopos de Durango (Disa)
- La Reina Del Pasito Duranguense — Diana Reyes (Musimex/Universal Latino)
- Parrandera, Rebelde y Atrevida — Jenni Rivera (Fonovisa/UG)

=== New Artist ===
- 100% Autoridad Duranguense — La Autoridad De La Sierra (Disa)
- Gracias Rigo — La Autoridad De La Sierra (Disa)
- La Reina Del Pasito Duranguense — Diana Reyes (Musimex/Universal Latino)
- Las Dos Caras De La Moneda — Beto Terrazas (Sony BMG Norte)

== Latin Pop Airplay Song of the Year ==
=== Male ===
- Porque Es Tan Cruel El Amor — Ricardo Arjona (Sony BMG Norte)
- Nada Es Para Siempre — Luis Fonsi (Universal Latino)
- La Camisa Negra — Juanes (Surco/Universal Latino)
- Amor Del Bueno — Reyli (Sony BMG Norte)

=== Female ===
- Viveme — Laura Pausini (Warner Latina)
- No — Shakira (Epic/Sony BMG Norte)
- Bandolero — Olga Tañón (Sony BMG Norte)
- Algo Esta Cambiando — Julieta Venegas (Ariola/Sony BMG Norte)

=== Duo or Group ===
- Obsesion (No Es Amor) — Frankie J Featuring Baby Bash (Columbia/Sony BMG Norte)
- Algo Mas — La 5ª Estación (Sony BMG Norte)
- Solo Quédate En Silencio — RBD (EMI Latin)
- La Tortura — Shakira Featuring Alejandro Sanz (Epic/Sony BMG Norte)

=== New Artist ===
- Algo Mas — La 5ª Estación (Sony BMG Norte)
- Solo Quédate En Silencio — RBD (EMI Latin)
- Yo Quisiera — Reik (Sony BMG Norte)
- Amor del Bueno — Reyli (Sony BMG Norte)

== Tropical Airplay Song of the Year ==
=== Male ===
- Que Ironia — Andy Andy (Wepa/Urban Box Office)
- Tu Amor Me Hace Bien — Marc Anthony (Sony BMG Norte)
- Para Ti — Juan Luis Guerra (Venemusic/Universal Latino)
- Resistire — Tono Rosario (Universal Latino)

=== Female ===
- Quiero Ser — Milly Quezada (J&N)
- Tu Eres — Brenda K. Starr (Mi Voz/Boss)
- Bandolero — Olga Tañón (Sony BMG Norte)
- Vete Vete — Olga Tañón (Sony BMG Norte)

=== Duo or Group ===
- Ella Y Yo — Aventura Featuring Don Omar (Premium Latin)
- La Boda — Aventura (Premium Latin)
- Hasta El Fin — Monchy y Alexandra (J&N)
- Amor de Una Noche — N'Klabe (NU/Sony BMG Norte)

=== New Artist ===
- Lamento Boliviano — Amarfis Y La Banda De Atakke (Amarfica/J&N)
- Me Extranaras — Edgar Daniel (Musical Productions)
- La Gorda Linda — Arthur Hanlon Featuring Tito Nieves (Fonovisa)
- Te Extrano — Xtreme (SGZ)

== Regional Mexican Airplay Song of the Year ==
=== Male Solo Artist ===
- Y Las Mariposas — Pancho Barraza (Musart/Balboa)
- Recostada En La Cama — El Chapo De Sinaloa (Disa)
- Ya Me Habian Dicho — Lupillo Rivera (Univision)
- Dueno De Ti — Sergio Vega (Sony BMG Norte)

=== Male Group ===
- No Puedo Olvidarte — Beto Y Sus Canarios (Disa)
- Hoy Como Ayer — Conjunto Primavera (Fonovisa)
- Mi Credo — K-Paz de la Sierra (Disa)
- Eres Divina — Patrulla 81 (Disa)

=== Female Group Or Female Solo Artist ===
- Lo Busque — Ana Bárbara (Fonovisa)
- Si La Quieres — Los Horóscopos de Durango (Disa)
- El Sol No Regresa — Diana Reyes (Musimex/Universal Latino)
- Que Me Vas A Dar — Jenni Rivera (Fonovisa)

=== New Artist ===
- Yo Me Quede Sin Nadie — La Autoridad De La Sierra (Disa)
- Fruta Prohibida — Los Elegidos (Fonovisa)
- Cosas del Amor — Sergio Vega (Sony BMG Norte)
- Dueno de Ti — Sergio Vega (Sony BMG Norte)

== Latin Tour of the Year ==
- Marc Anthony, Alejandro Fernández & Chayanne
- Vicente Fernández
- Juan Gabriel
- Luis Miguel

== Reggaeton ==
=== Album of the Year ===
- Barrio Fino: En Directo — Daddy Yankee (El Cartel/Interscope)
- Da Hitman Presents Reggaeton Latino — Don Omar (VI/Machete/UMRG)
- Flashback — Ivy Queen (La Calle/Univision)
- Pa'l Mundo — Wisin & Yandel (Machete)

=== Song of the Year ===
(new category)

- Ven Bailalo — Angel & Khriz (Luar/MVP/Machete)
- Mayor Que Yo — Baby Ranks, Daddy Yankee, Tonny Tun Tun, Wisin, Yandel & Héctor el Father (Mas Flow/Machete)
- Lo Que Paso, Paso — Daddy Yankee (El Cartel/VI/Machete)
- Rakata — Wisin & Yandel (Mas Flow/Machete)

== Other Latin ==
=== Latin Ringtone of the Year ===
(new category)

- Gasolina — Daddy Yankee (El Cartel/VI/Machete)
- Lo Que Paso, Paso — Daddy Yankee (El Cartel/VI/Machete)
- Solo Quédate En Silencio — RBD (EMI Latin)
- La Tortura — Shakira Featuring Alejandro Sanz (Epic/Sony BMG Norte)

=== Latin Dance Club Play Track of the Year ===
- No Te Quiero Olvidar (Ralphi Rosario Remix) — Betzaida (Fonovisa)
- La Gorda Linda (Norty Cotto Remix) — Arthur Hanlon Featuring Tito Nieves (Fonovisa)
- I Don't Care/Que Más Dá (Dance Remixes) — Ricky Martin Featuring Fat Joe (Columbia/Sony BMG Norte)
- Sugar Daddy — Yerba Buena (Fun Machine/Razor & Tie)

=== Latin Rap/Hip-Hop Album of the Year ===
- Kickin' ItýJuntos — Akwid & Jae-P (Univision)
- Los Aguacates De Jiquilpan — Akwid (Univision)
- Desahogo — Vico C (EMI Latin)
- John Ghetto — Juan Gotti (Dope House/Warner Latina)

=== Latin Greatest Hits Album of the Year ===
- Antologia De Un Rey — Ramón Ayala Y Sus Bravos Del Norte (Freddie)
- Tesoros De Coleccion: Lo Romantico De Los Caminantes — Los Caminantes (Sony BMG Norte)
- Historia De Una Reina — Ana Gabriel (Sony BMG Norte)
- La Historia Continua Parte II — Marco Antonio Solís (Fonovisa)

=== Latin Compilation Album of the Year ===
- Mas Flow 2 — Luny Tunes & Baby Ranks (Mas Flow/Machete)
- Boy Wonder & Chencho Records Present: El Draft 2005 — Various Artists (Chencho/Chosen Few Emerald/Urban Box Office)
- Chosen Few: El Documental — Various Artists (Chosen Few Emerald/Urban Box Office)
- The Hitmakers Of Reggaeton — Various Artists (VI/Machete)

=== Latin Jazz Album of the Year ===
- Vol. 5: Carnival — Los Hombres Calientes (Basin Street)
- Listen Here! — Eddie Palmieri (Concord)
- Do It! — Poncho Sanchez (Concord Picante/Concord)
- Sandoval: Live At The Blue Note — Arturo Sandoval (Half Note)

=== Latin Christian/Gospel Album of the Year ===
- Timeless — The Katinas (BHT/Word-Curb)
- Que Tan Lejos Esta El Cielo — Salvador (Word-Curb/Warner Bros.)
- So Natural — Salvador (Warner Bros./Word-Curb)
- Dios Es Bueno — Marcos Witt (CanZion/Sony BMG Norte)

== People ==
=== Songwriter of the Year ===
- Raymond Ayala (Daddy Yankee)
- Juan Gabriel
- Juanes
- William O. Landron (Don Omar)

=== Producer of the Year ===
- Armando Avila
- Jesus Guillen
- Eliel Lind
- Luny Tunes

== Labels ==
=== Publisher of the Year ===
- EMI April, ASCAP
- EMI Blackwood, BMI
- Ser-Ca, BMI
- WB, ASCAP

=== Publishing Corporation of the Year ===
- EMI Music Publishing
- Peermusic Publishing
- Sony/ATV Music Publishing
- Warner/Chappell Music Publishing

=== Hot Latin Songs Label of the Year ===
- Disa
- Fonovisa
- Sony BMG Norte
- Universal Latino

=== Top Latin Albums Label of the Year ===
- Disa
- Machete
- Sony BMG Norte
- Univision Music Group

=== Latin Pop Airplay Label of the Year ===
- EMI Latin
- Sony BMG Norte
- Universal Latino
- Warner Latina

=== Tropical Airplay Label of the Year ===
- J&N
- Machete
- Sony BMG Norte
- Universal Latino

=== Regional Mexican Airplay Label of the Year ===
- Disa
- EMI Latin
- Fonovisa
- Univision

=== Latin Pop Albums Label of the Year ===
- EMI Latin
- Sony BMG Norte
- Universal Latino
- Univision Music Group

=== Tropical Albums Label of the Year ===
- Machete
- Sony BMG Norte
- Universal Latino
- Urban Box Office

=== Regional Mexican Albums Label of the Year ===
- Disa
- EMI Latin
- Sony BMG Norte
- Univision Music Group

=== Billboard "Life Achievement Award" ===
- Joan Sebastian

=== Billboard "Spirit of Hope Award" ===
- Shakira

== See also ==
- Billboard Latin Music Awards
- Billboard Music Award
