= Lo Nuestro Award for Video of the Year =

American annual award for Latin music

- Awarded for: Video of the Year
- Country: United States
- Presented by: Univision
- First award: 1991
- Currently held by: Los Rivera Destino and Bad Bunny (2020)

Highlights
- Most awards: Ricky Martin (4)
- Most nominations: Maná (9)
- Website: univision.com/premiolonuestro

The Lo Nuestro Award for Video of the Year is an honor presented annually by American television network Univision at the Lo Nuestro Awards. The accolade was established to recognize the most talented performers of Latin music. The award was first presented in 1991 to Juan Luis Guerra. Ricky Martin is the most awarded performer, with four victories.

== Recipients and milestones ==
The nominees and winners were originally selected by a voting poll conducted among program directors of Spanish-language radio stations in the United States and also based on chart performance on Billboard Latin music charts, with the results being tabulated and certified by the accounting firm Deloitte. However, since 2004, the winners are selected through an online survey. The trophy awarded is shaped in the form of a treble clef.

The award was first presented to "A Pedir Su Mano" by Dominican singer Juan Luis Guerra in 1991. Puerto-Rican American singer Ricky Martin and Spanish artist Enrique Iglesias are the most awarded performers, with four victories for Martin, for "Te Extraño, Te Olvido, Te Amo", "Bella", "She Bangs" and "La Mordidita" and Iglesias with three victories, "Esperanza", "Héroe" and "Bailando"; Martin also won the Latin Grammy Award for Best Short Form Music Video for "She Bangs". Iglesias' "Héroe" won the Lo Nuestro and also was nominated for Video of the Year in the MTV Video Music Awards Latinoamérica of 2002 and the English-language version of the video was a four-time nominee in the 2002 MTV Video Music Awards including Viewer's Choice and Best Male Video. Two-time winners include Puerto-Rican reggaeton performer Daddy Yankee and Colombian artist Juanes. Mexican band Maná and Spanish singer-songwriter Alejandro Sanz are the most nominated artists without a win, with seven unsuccessful nominations each.

== Winners and nominees ==
Listed below are the winners of the award for each year, as well as the other nominees.

Key	Meaning
‡	Indicates the winning music video

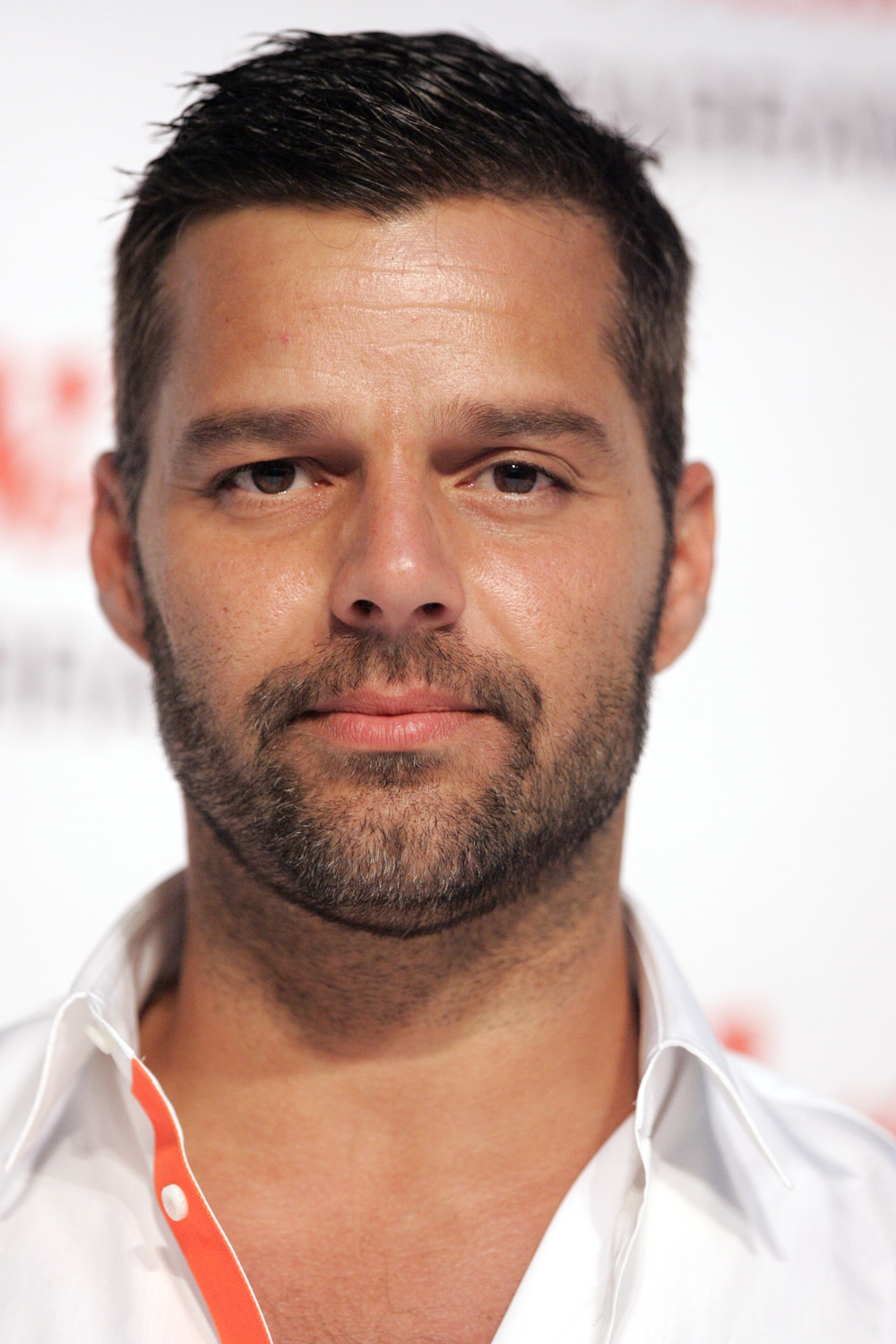
Puerto-Rican American singer Ricky Martin (pictured in 2013), the most awarded performer, with four wins

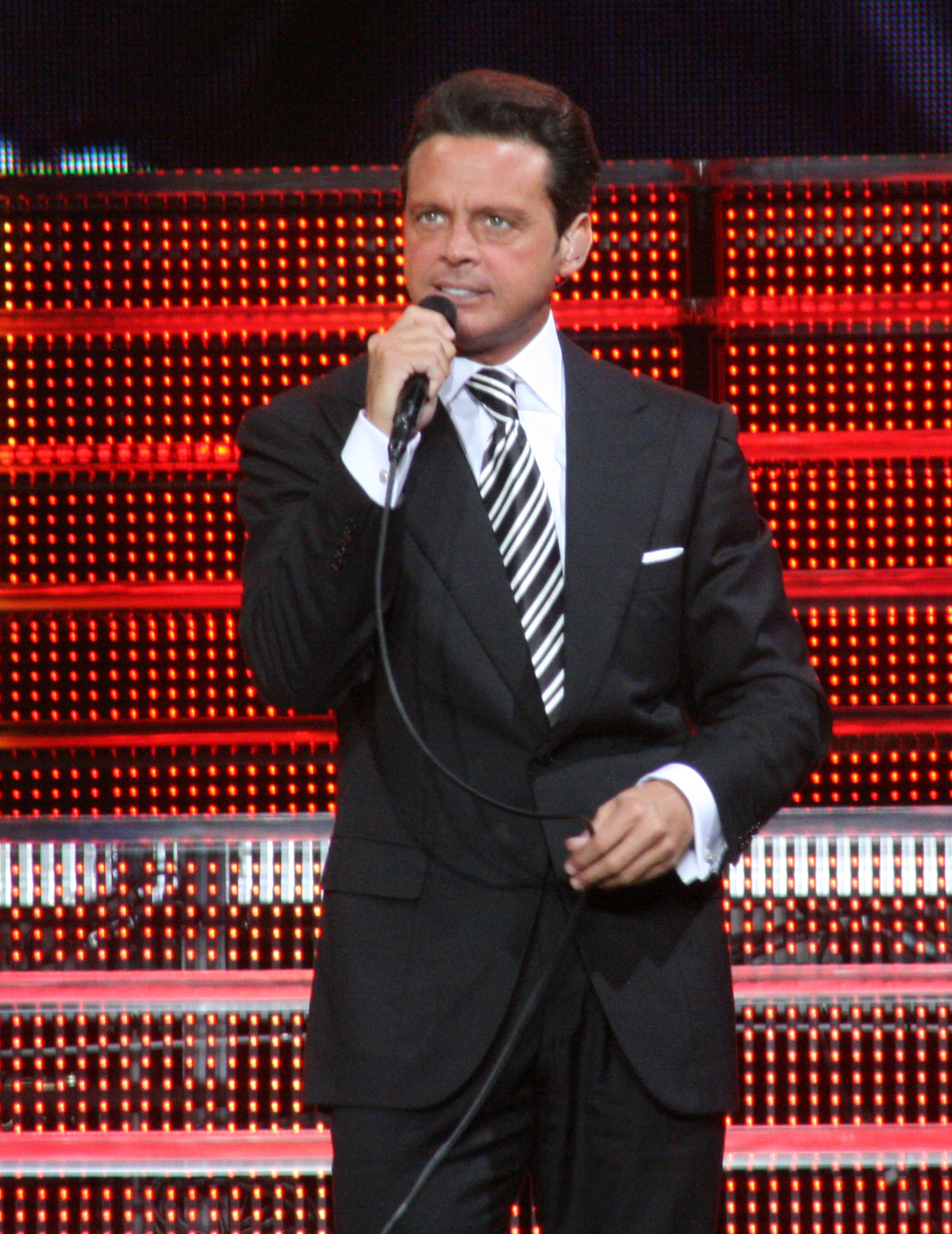
Mexican performer Luis Miguel (pictured in 2009), winner in 1994

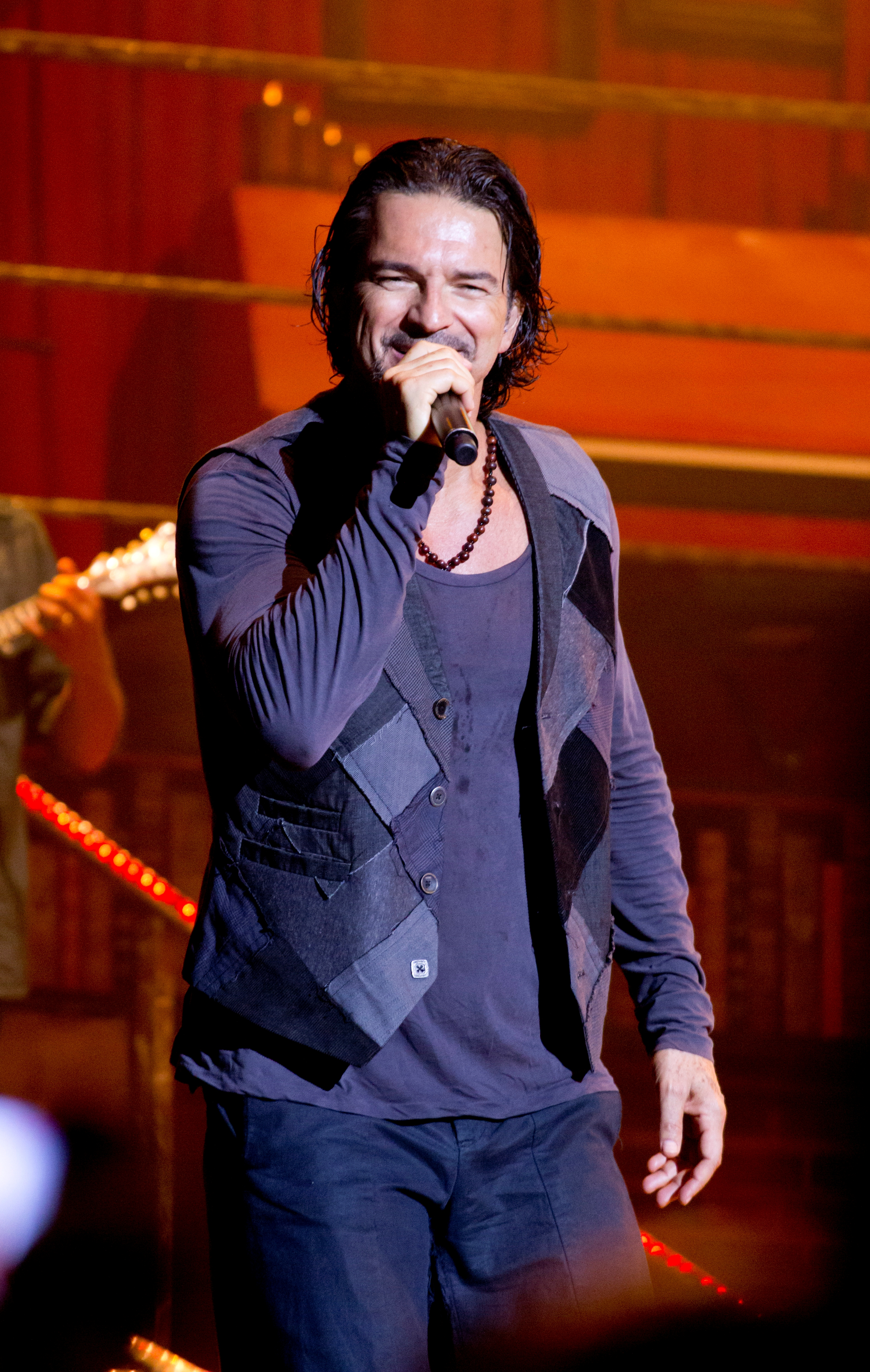
Guatemalan performer Ricardo Arjona (pictured in 2013), winner in 1998

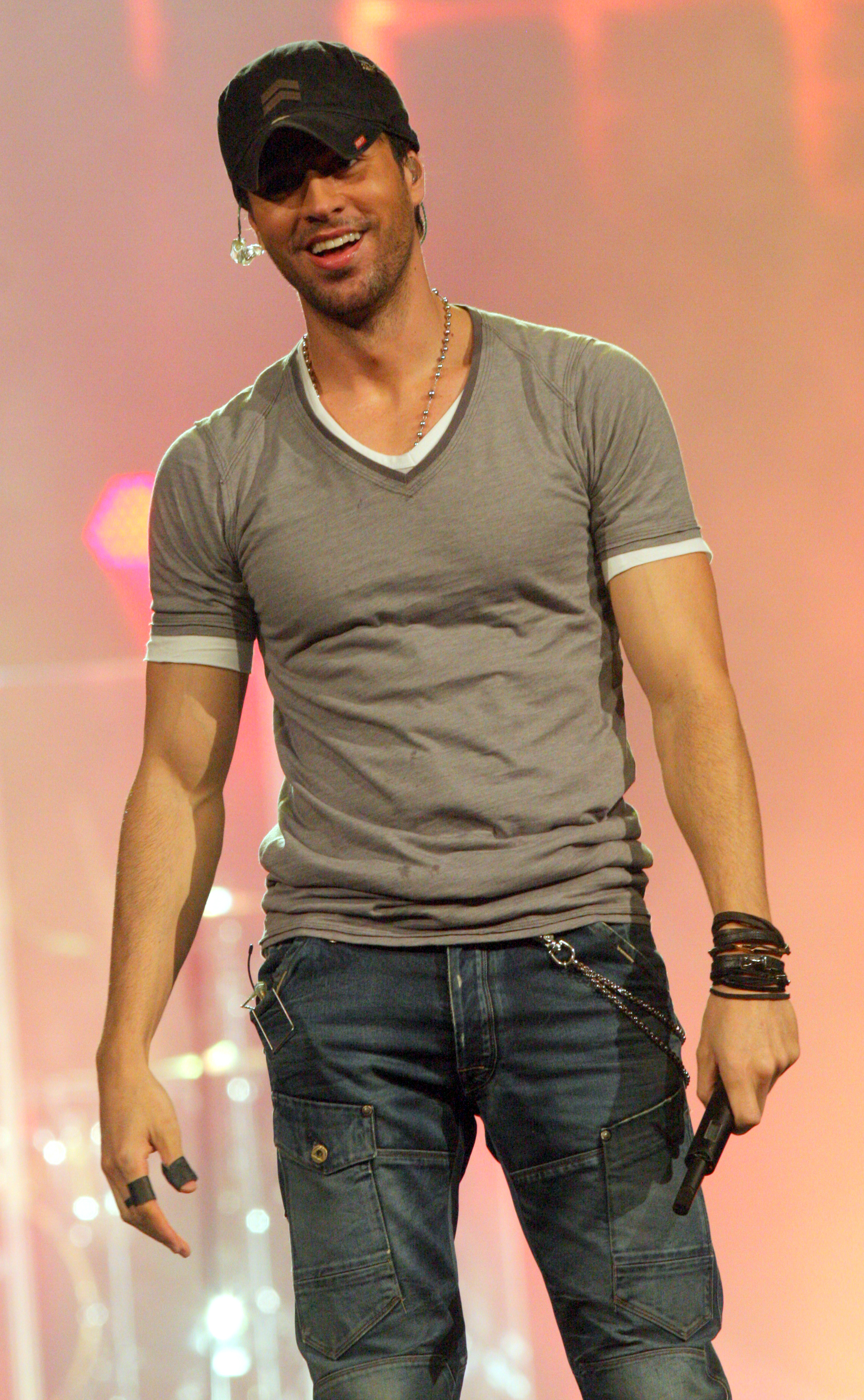
Spanish singer Enrique Iglesias (pictured in 2011), winner in 1999, 2002 and 2014

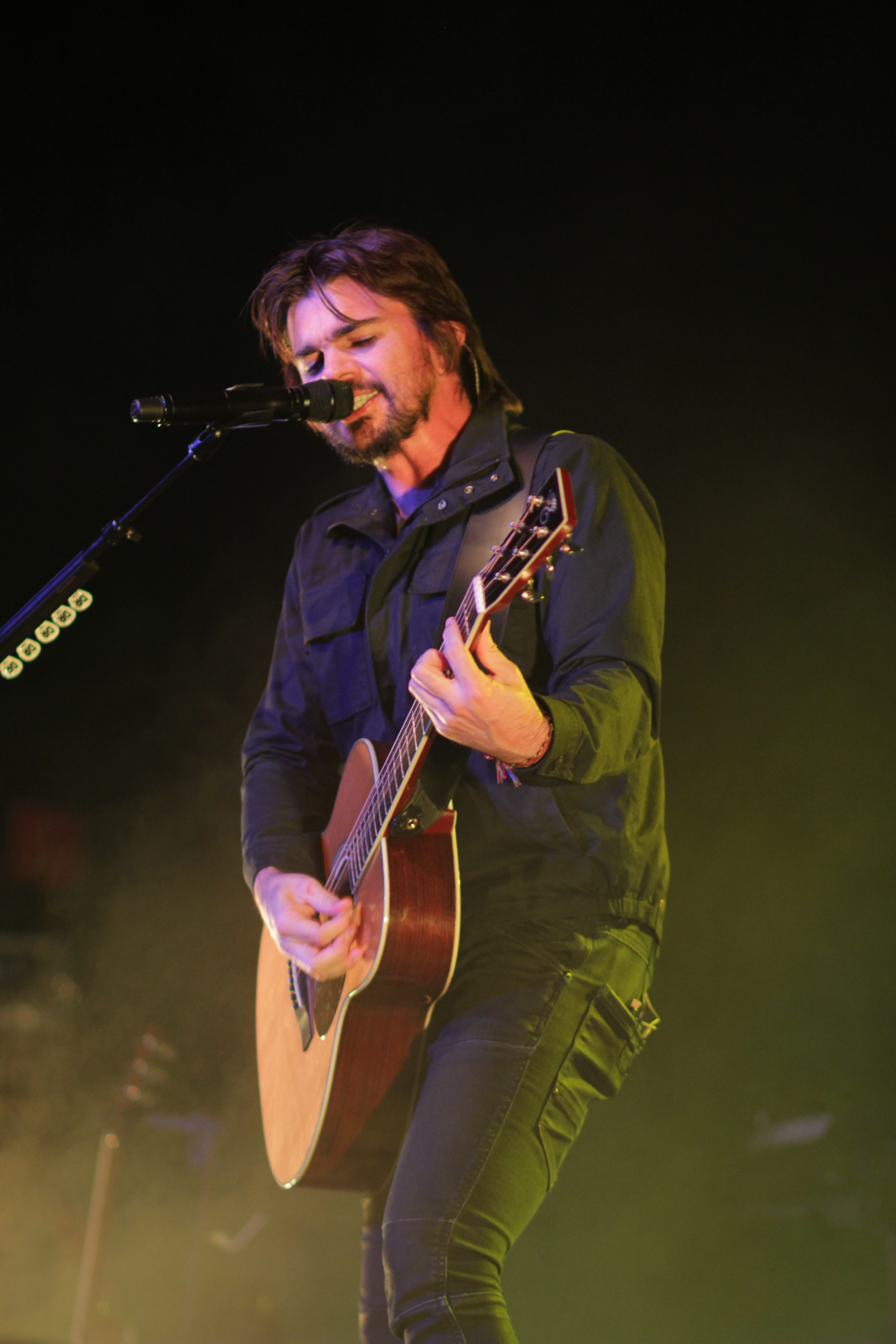
Colombian performer Juanes (pictured in 2012), two-time winner

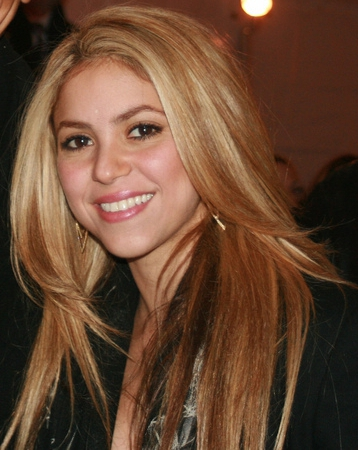
Colombian performer Shakira (pictured in 2009), winner in 2010 and 2017

Year	Music Video	Performer(s)	Ref
1991 (3rd)	"A Pedir Su Mano"‡	Juan Luis Guerra y 440	
1992 (4th)	"Todo, Todo, Todo"‡	Daniela Romo	
1992 (4th)	"Cosas del Amor"	Vikki Carr and Ana Gabriel	
1992 (4th)	"Amor Mío, ¿Qué Me Has Hecho?"	Camilo Sesto	
1992 (4th)	"Sera"	Ricardo Montaner	
1992 (4th)	"Déjame Llorar"	Ricardo Montaner	
1992 (4th)	"No Basta"	Franco De Vita	
1992 (4th)	"Vuela Vuela"	Magneto	
1992 (4th)	"No He Podido Verte"	Emmanuel	
1992 (4th)	"Popurri"	Pandora	
1992 (4th)	"Fiesta"	Banda Blanca	
1993 (5th)	"Una Rosa Es Una Rosa"‡	Mecano	
1993 (5th)	"El Sheriff de Chocolate"	Bronco	
1993 (5th)	"María"	Café Tacuba	
1993 (5th)	"Magdalena"	Emmanuel	
1993 (5th)	"El Costo de la Vida"	Juan Luis Guerra y 440	
1993 (5th)	"Me Estoy Enamorando"	La Mafia	
1993 (5th)	"América, América"	Luis Miguel	
1993 (5th)	"Castillo Azul"	Ricardo Montaner	
1993 (5th)	"Llovió"	Presuntos Implicados	
1993 (5th)	"Otro Día Más Sin Verte"	Jon Secada	
1994 (6th)	"Sabor, Sabor"‡	Rosario Flores	
1994 (6th)	"Rarotonga"	Café Tacuba	
1994 (6th)	"Tu Ingratitud"	Los Bukis	
1994 (6th)	"Coronita de Flores"	Juan Luis Guerra y 440	
1994 (6th)	"Mírala, Míralo"	Alejandra Guzmán	
1994 (6th)	"Ayer"	Luis Miguel	
1994 (6th)	"La Mañana"	Luis Enrique	
1994 (6th)	"Vivir Sin Aire"	Maná	
1994 (6th)	"Otra Como Tú"	Eros Ramazzotti	
1994 (6th)	"Somos"	Edi Xol	
1995 (7th)	"La Media Vuelta"‡	Luis Miguel	
1995 (7th)	"Viviré"	Juan Luis Guerra y 440	
1995 (7th)	"Así Es La Vida"	Luis Enrique	
1995 (7th)	"Te Lloré un Río"	Maná	
1995 (7th)	"Qué Sabes Tú"	Daniela Romo	
1995 (7th)	"Si Te Vas"	Jon Secada	
1995 (7th)	"Reencuentro"	Álvaro Torres and Barrio Boyzz	
1996 (8th)	"Te Extraño, Te Olvido, Te Amo"‡	Ricky Martin	
1996 (8th)	"Tesoro (Pudo Ser Tu Nombre...)"	Miguel Bosé	
1996 (8th)	"No es el Fin del Mundo"	Emilio Navaira	
1996 (8th)	"Como Quien Pierde Una Estrella"	Alejandro Fernández	
1996 (8th)	"Hipnótizame"	Fobia	
1996 (8th)	"Experiencia Religiosa"	Enrique Iglesias	
1996 (8th)	"Palabras"	Lucero	
1996 (8th)	"La Fuerza del Corazón"	Alejandro Sanz	
1996 (8th)	"Penélope"	Diego Torres	
1996 (8th)	"La Tierra del Olvido"	Carlos Vives	
1997 (9th)	"La Aurora"‡	Eros Ramazzotti	
1997 (9th)	"Como Te Extraño"	Café Tacuba	
1997 (9th)	"Volver a Nacer"	Chayanne	
1997 (9th)	"Dame"	Luis Miguel	
1997 (9th)	"Las Cosas Que Vives"	Laura Pausini	
1997 (9th)	"Mátame"	Daniela Romo	
1997 (9th)	"Pies Descalzos, Sueños Blancos"	Shakira	
1997 (9th)	"Stress"	Álvaro Torres	
1997 (9th)	"Sé Que Ya No Volverás"	Diego Torres	
1997 (9th)	"Menta y Romero"	Zucchero	
1998 (10th)	"Ella y Él"‡	Ricardo Arjona	
1998 (10th)	"Si Tú Me Amaras"	Cristian Castro	
1998 (10th)	"No Sé Olvidar"	Alejandro Fernández	
1998 (10th)	"Pata Pata"	El General	
1998 (10th)	"Desesperadamente Enamorado"	Jordi	
1998 (10th)	"Hechicera"	Maná	
1998 (10th)	"Y Hubo Alguien"	Marc Anthony	
1998 (10th)	"Que Diera"	Carlos Vives	
1998 (10th)	"Corazón Partío"	Alejandro Sanz	
1998 (10th)	"Mujer Latina"	Thalía	
1999 (11th)	"Esperanza"‡	Enrique Iglesias	
1999 (11th)	"El Aguacero"	Juan Luis Guerra	
1999 (11th)	"En el Muelle de San Blas"	Maná	
1999 (11th)	"No Puedo Olvidar"	MDO	
1999 (11th)	"Rezo"	Carlos Ponce	
1999 (11th)	"Ciega, Sordomuda"	Shakira	
1999 (11th)	"Tu Amor"	Olga Tañón	
2000 (12th)	"Bella"‡	Ricky Martin	
2001 (13th)	"She Bangs"‡	Ricky Martin	
2002 (14th)	"Héroe"‡	Enrique Iglesias	
2002 (14th)	"Shhh!"	A.B. Quintanilla & Kumbia Kings	
2002 (14th)	"Tantita Pena"	Alejandro Fernández	
2002 (14th)	"Quisiera"	Juan Luis Guerra	
2002 (14th)	"Bésame"	Ricardo Montaner	
2002 (14th)	"Cumbia Sobre el Río"	Celso Piña	
2002 (14th)	"Y Yo Sigo Aquí"	Paulina Rubio	
2002 (14th)	"Amor a la Mexicana" (banda version)	Thalía	
2002 (14th)	"Reencarnación"	Thalía	
2002 (14th)	"I Wanna Go"	Tranzas	
2003 (15th)	"A Dios le Pido"‡	Juanes	
2003 (15th)	"Ángel de Amor"	Maná	
2003 (15th)	"Carito"	Carlos Vives	
2003 (15th)	"Hay Otra en Tu Lugar"	Pablo Montero	
2003 (15th)	"Lloviendo Estrellas"	Cristian Castro	
2003 (15th)	"Mentiroso"	Enrique Iglesias	
2003 (15th)	"Mi Sufrimiento"	Jorge Moreno	
2003 (15th)	"Si Tú Te Vas"	Paulina Rubio	
2003 (15th)	"Tu Boca"	Cabas	
2003 (15th)	"Vuela Muy Alto"	Jerry Rivera	
2004 (16th)	"Bonito"‡	Jarabe de Palo	
2004 (16th)	"Fotografía"	Juanes featuring Nelly Furtado	
2004 (16th)	"No Es Lo Mismo"	Alejandro Sanz	
2004 (16th)	"Quitémonos la Ropa"	Alexandre Pires	
2004 (16th)	"Perfume"	Bajofondo	
2004 (16th)	"Dígale"	David Bisbal	
2004 (16th)	"Hoy"	Gloria Estefan	
2004 (16th)	"Minutos"	Ricardo Arjona	
2004 (16th)	"Jaleo"	Ricky Martin	
2004 (16th)	"Amor Amor"	Roselyn Sánchez	
2005 (17th)	"Te Quise Tanto"‡	Paulina Rubio	
2005 (17th)	"Ahora Quién"	Marc Anthony	
2005 (17th)	"Bulería"	David Bisbal	
2005 (17th)	"Santa María"	Gotan Project	
2005 (17th)	"Lágrimas"	JD Natasha	
2005 (17th)	"Try to Save Your S'ong"	Alejandro Sanz	
2006 (18th)	"Nada Es Para Siempre"‡	Luis Fonsi	
2006 (18th)	"Nace"	Anasol	
2006 (18th)	"Víveme"	Laura Pausini	
2006 (18th)	"Que Seas Feliz"	Luis Miguel	
2006 (18th)	"No"	Shakira	
2006 (18th)	"Desahogo"	Vico C	
2007 (19th)	"Angelito"‡	Don Omar	
2007 (19th)	"Mojado"	Ricardo Arjona and Intocable	
2007 (19th)	"Ni Freud Ni Tu Mamá"	Belinda	
2007 (19th)	"Labios Compartidos"	Maná	
2007 (19th)	"Todos Me Miran"	Gloria Trevi	
2007 (19th)	"Me Voy"	Julieta Venegas	
2008 (20th)	"Impacto"‡	Daddy Yankee featuring Fergie	
2008 (20th)	"Baila Mi Corazón"	Belanova	
2008 (20th)	"Pa'l Norte"	Calle 13 featuring Orishas	
2008 (20th)	"Dímelo"	Enrique Iglesias	
2008 (20th)	"Me Enamora"	Juanes	
2009 (21st)	"Pose"‡	Daddy Yankee	
2009 (21st)	"La Novela"	Akwid	
2009 (21st)	"Un Beso de Desayuno"	Calle 13	
2009 (21st)	"Tu Adiós No Mata"	Intocable	
2009 (21st)	"Visible"	Jaguares	
2010 (22nd)	"Loba"‡	Shakira	
2010 (22nd)	"Recuérdame"	La 5ª Estación featuring Marc Anthony	
2010 (22nd)	"La Perla"	Calle 13	
2010 (22nd)	"Esclavo de Sus Besos"	David Bisbal	
2010 (22nd)	"Cumbayá"	Pee Wee	
2010 (22nd)	"Loco Por Ti"	Los Temerarios	
2011 (23rd)	"Egoísta"‡	Belinda featuring Pitbull	
2011 (23rd)	"De Donde Vengo Yo"	ChocQuibTown	
2011 (23rd)	"Hasta Contar a Mil"	Jotdog	
2011 (23rd)	"Loca"	Aleks Syntek	
2011 (23rd)	"Puente"	Ricardo Arjona	
2012 (24th)	"Tu Olor"‡	Wisin & Yandel	
2012 (24th)	"Bienvenido"	Laura Pausini	
2012 (24th)	"Como Tu Nay 2"	Beatriz Luengo	
2012 (24th)	"Dopamina"	Belinda	
2012 (24th)	"Respira"	Luis Fonsi	
2012 (24th)	"Tengo Tu Love"	Sie7e	
2013 (25th)	"¡Corre!"‡	Jesse & Joy	
2013 (25th)	"Follow the Leader"	Wisin & Yandel featuring Jennifer Lopez	
2013 (25th)	"Jamás Abandoné"	Laura Pausini	
2013 (25th)	"No Me Compares"	Alejandro Sanz	
2013 (25th)	"Quiero Creer"	Beto Cuevas featuring Flo Rida	
2014 (26th)	"Propuesta Indecente"‡	Romeo Santos	
2014 (26th)	"Come with Me"	Ricky Martin	
2014 (26th)	"Hablé de Ti"	Yandel	
2014 (26th)	"Hoy Tengo Ganas de Ti"	Alejandro Fernández featuring Christina Aguilera	
2014 (26th)	"Ice El Hielo"	La Santa Cecilia	
2014 (26th)	"I Love It"	Jencarlos Canela	
2014 (26th)	"Me Quiero Enamorar"	Jesse & Joy	
2014 (26th)	"Mi Marciana"	Alejandro Sanz	
2014 (26th)	"Tranquila"	J Balvin	
2014 (26th)	"So What"	Sie7e	
2015 (27th)	"Bailando"‡	Enrique Iglesias featuring Descemer Bueno and Gente de Zona	
2015 (27th)	"Adrenalina"	Wisin featuring Jennifer Lopez and Ricky Martin	
2015 (27th)	"Apnea"	Ricardo Arjona	
2015 (27th)	"Arrullo de Estrellas"	Zoé	
2015 (27th)	"Cuando Nos Volvamos a Encontrar"	Carlos Vives featuring Marc Anthony	
2015 (27th)	"Me Olvidé de Vivir"	Alejandro Fernández featuring Vicente Fernández	
2015 (27th)	"No Amanece"	David Bisbal	
2015 (27th)	"Ora Por Mi"	Daddy Yankee	
2015 (27th)	"Tu Respiración"	Chayanne	
2015 (27th)	"Tus Besos"	Juan Luis Guerra	
2016 (28th)	"La Mordidita"‡	Ricky Martin featuring Yotuel	
2016 (28th)	"Encanto"	Miguel Bosé	
2016 (28th)	"La Gozadera"	Marc Anthony and Gente de Zona	
2016 (28th)	"La Tierra del Olvido" (live)	Carlos Vives	
2016 (28th)	"Mi Verdad"	Maná and Shakira	
2016 (28th)	"Somos Dos"	Bomba Estéreo	
2016 (28th)	"Un Zombie a la Intemperie"	Alejandro Sanz	
2017 (29th)	"La Bicicleta"‡	Carlos Vives and Shakira	
2017 (29th)	"Andas en Mi Cabeza"	Chino & Nacho featuring Daddy Yankee	
2017 (29th)	"Safari"	J Balvin featuring Pharrell Williams, BIA and Sky	
2017 (29th)	"Soy Yo"	Bomba Estereo	
2017 (29th)	"Tu Enemigo"	Pablo López featuring Juanes	
2019 (31st)	"Mi Cama (Remix)"	Karol G featuring J Balvin and Nicky Jam	
2019 (31st)	"Tu Refugio"	Pablo Alborán	
2019 (31st)	"Seremos"	El Bebeto	
2019 (31st)	"El Préstamo"	Maluma	
2019 (31st)	"La Vida Sin Ti"	Piso 21	
2019 (31st)	"Celoso"	Lele Pons	
2019 (31st)	"1, 2, 3"	Sofía Reyes featuring Jason Derulo and De La Ghetto	
2019 (31st)	"Sexo"	Residente and Dillon Francis featuring iLe	
2019 (31st)	"Malamente"	Rosalía	
2019 (31st)	"Ya No Tiene Novio"	Sebastián Yatra featuring Mau y Ricky	
2020 (32st)	"Flor"	Los Rivera Destino featuring Bad Bunny	
2020 (32st)	"Aleluya"	Reik and Manuel Turizo	
2020 (32st)	"Blue (Diminuto Planeta Azul)"	Macaco featuring Jorge Drexler and Joan Manuel Serrat	
2020 (32st)	"En Guerra"	Sebastián Yatra and Camilo	
2020 (32st)	"La Prisión del Folsom (Folsom Prison Blues)"	Los Tigres del Norte	
2020 (32st)	"Party"	Paulo Londra featuring A Boogie Wit Da Hoodie	
2020 (32st)	"Rayando el Sol"	Maná featuring Pablo Alborán	
2020 (32st)	"R.I.P."	Sofía Reyes featuring Rita Ora y Anitta	
2020 (32st)	"Tú Eres la Razón (Electrocumbia Remake)"	Raymix	
2020 (32st)	"Tu Rumba"	iLe	

== See also ==
- Latin Grammy Award for Best Short Form Music Video
- Los Premios MTV Latinoamérica for Video of the Year
