= List of Billboard Regional Mexican Albums number ones of 2005 =

The Regional Mexican Albums, published in Billboard magazine, is a record chart that features Latin music sales information for regional styles of Mexican music. This data are compiled by Nielsen SoundScan from a sample that includes music stores, music departments at department stores and verifiable sales from concert venues in the United States.

== Albums ==
Issue date	Album	Artist(s)	Reference(s)
January 1	México en la Piel	Luis Miguel	
January 8	México en la Piel	Luis Miguel	
January 15	México en la Piel	Luis Miguel	
January 22	México en la Piel	Luis Miguel	
January 29	15 Duranguenses De Corazon	Various Artists	
February 5	15 Duranguenses De Corazon	Various Artists	
February 12	Cronica De Dos Grandes: Recuerdos Con Amor	Grupo Bronco/Los Bukis	
February 19	Y Sigue La Mata Dando	Grupo Montez de Durango	
February 26	Y Sigue La Mata Dando	Grupo Montez de Durango	
March 5	X	Intocable	
March 12	X	Intocable	
March 19	Y Seguimos Con Duranguense	Los Horóscopos de Durango	
March 26	Y Seguimos Con Duranguense	Los Horóscopos de Durango	
April 2	Y Seguimos Con Duranguense	Los Horóscopos de Durango	
April 9	X †	Intocable	
April 16	Directo Al Corazón	Los Tigres del Norte	
April 23	Directo Al Corazón	Los Tigres del Norte	
April 30	Directo Al Corazón	Los Tigres del Norte	
May 7	Divinas	Patrulla 81	
May 14	Divinas	Patrulla 81	
May 21	Divinas	Patrulla 81	
May 28	Divinas	Patrulla 81	
June 4	Divinas	Patrulla 81	
June 11	Divinas	Patrulla 81	
June 18	Divinas	Patrulla 81	
June 25	Divinas	Patrulla 81	
July 2	Divinas	Patrulla 81	
July 9	Divinas	Patrulla 81	
July 16	Agarron Durango Vs Tierra Caliente	Various Artists	
July 23	Dejando Huella II	Conjunto Primavera	
July 30	Dejando Huella II	Conjunto Primavera	
August 6	Ardientes	Beto y sus Canarios	
August 13	Ardientes	Beto y sus Canarios	
August 20	Por Muchas Razones Te Quiero	Grupo Bryndis	
August 27	Por Muchas Razones Te Quiero	Grupo Bryndis	
September 3	Por Muchas Razones Te Quiero	Grupo Bryndis	
September 10	Por Muchas Razones Te Quiero	Grupo Bryndis	
September 17	Vive	Grupo Montez de Durango	
September 24	Sueno De Amor	Los Temerarios	
October 1	Sueno De Amor	Los Temerarios	
October 8	Sueno De Amor	Los Temerarios	
October 15	Sueno De Amor	Los Temerarios	
October 22	Más Capaces que Nunca	K-Paz de la Sierra	
October 29	Más Capaces que Nunca	K-Paz de la Sierra	
November 5	Más Capaces que Nunca	K-Paz de la Sierra	
November 12	Más Capaces que Nunca	K-Paz de la Sierra	
November 19	Más Capaces que Nunca	K-Paz de la Sierra	
November 26	Más Capaces que Nunca	K-Paz de la Sierra	
December 3	Los Super Exitos: Lagrimillas Tontas	Grupo Montez de Durango	
December 10	Los Super Exitos: Lagrimillas Tontas	Grupo Montez de Durango	
December 17	Más Capaces que Nunca †	K-Paz de la Sierra	
December 24	Mis Duetos	Vicente Fernández	
December 31	Mis Duetos	Vicente Fernández	
