= Acústico (La Quinta Estación album) =

Studio album by La 5ª Estación
- Released: November 1, 2005
- Recorded: 2005
- Genre: Latin; Pop rock
- Length: 42:20
- Label: Ariola; Sony BMG
- Producer: Armando Ávila

La 5ª Estación chronology
Flores De Alquiler (2004)	Acústico (2005)	El Mundo Se Equivoca (2006)

Acústico is a studio album/DVD combination from Spanish/Mexican pop rock group La 5ª Estación. The album features acoustic renditions of songs that were originally recorded on the band's first two albums, Primera Toma and Flores De Alquiler.

== Track listing ==
1. "Daría" – 3:39 (Pontes, Villarrubia)
2. "Esperaré Despierta" – 4:00 (Jimenez)
3. "Rompe El Mar" – 3:31 (Jimenez)
4. "Niña" – 4:26 (Jimenez)
5. "Flores de Alquiler" – 3:40 (Pontes, Villarrubia)
6. "Perdición" – 4:04 (Jimenez)
7. "El Sol No Regresa" – 4:25 (Pontes, Villarrubia)
8. "Algo Más" – 7:33 (Avila, Jimenez)
9. "Busco Tu Piel" – 3:41 (Pontes, Villarrubia)
10. "Cuando Acaba La Noche" – 4:41 (Pontes)

== Personnel ==
- Armando Avila – directing, mixing, producer
- Carlos Garcia – A&R
- Guillermo Gutierrez Leyva – A&R
- Juan Carlos Miguel – engineering
- Gilda Oropeza – A&R
- Jose Juan Sanchez – photography
- Don C. Tyler – mastering

== Charts ==
Chart (2005–2007)	Peak position
Spanish Albums (PROMUSICAE)	73
US Top Latin Albums (Billboard)	28
US Latin Pop Albums (Billboard)	11

== Certifications ==
Region	Certification	Certified units/sales
Mexico (AMPROFON)	Platinum	100,000^{^}
^{^} Shipments figures based on certification alone.
