= Capitol Latin =

American record label

- Parent company: Universal Music Group (2012–present); EMI (1989–2012)
- Founded: 1989; 37 years ago (as Capitol/EMI Latin); 2009 (as Capitol Latin)
- Founder: José Behar
- Status: It was merged with Universal Music Latin Entertainment following Universal Music Group's acquisition of EMI.
- Genre: Latin
- Country of origin: United States
- Location: Los Angeles, California, U.S.

Capitol Latin (formerly EMI Latin and Capitol/EMI Latin) is a brand of Universal Music Latin Entertainment, a division of Universal Music Group. Previously, it was a subsidiary of EMI.

== History ==
In 1989, José Behar, the former head of CBS Discos, signed Selena to Capitol/EMI Latin, because he thought he had discovered the next Gloria Estéfan.

In 1990, Capitol/EMI Latin acquired San Antonio, Texas–based Cara Records in order to capitalize on the popularity of Tejano. Artists under the Cara label included Mazz, David Lee Garza, and La Mafia.

In mid-1993, Capitol/EMI Latin was rebranded as simply EMI Latin.

Popular EMI Latin performers linked to the EMI Televisa Music and Televisa networks included Thalía, Pedro Fernández, RBD, María Daniela y su Sonido Lasser, and Kudai. The label also signed reggaeton artists like DJ Flex and Tito El Bambino.

In 2009, EMI Latin ended its partnership with Televisa, moved from Miami, to Los Angeles, and was renamed Capitol Latin. After Universal Music Group's acquisition of EMI in 2012, Capitol Latin merged with Universal Music Latin Entertainment. The Capitol Latin record label is now a brand of Universal Music Latin Entertainment division and continues to be distributed by Universal Music Group.

== Label artists ==
The following is a select list of artists currently or previously signed to the label:

- A. B. Quintanilla
- Alberto Plaza
- Alejandra Guzmán
- Aleks Syntek
- Álvaro Torres
- Amaral
- Aracely Arámbula
- Babasónicos
- Barrio Boyzz
- Bebe
- Belinda
- Big Circo
- Bunbury
- Cabas
- Carlos Ponce
- Carlos Vives
- Catupecu Machu
- Charly García
- Christian Chávez
- Chuy Jr. y sus Jardineros
- Cuba 21
- Daniela Romo
- Daddy Yankee
- Diana Reyes
- DJ Kane
- Domino Saints
- Eiza González
- El Gran Silencio
- El Momento
- Fey
- Guatauba
- Haydée
- Jaguares
- Jailene Cintrón
- Intocable
- J Balvin
- JD Natasha
- Joey Montana
- Johnny Hernández
- Juan Luis Guerra
- Kumbia Kings
- La Mosca Tse Tse
- La Onda
- Laura Canales
- Limi-T 21
- Los Auténticos Decadentes
- Los Caudillos Del Norte
- Los Claxons
- Los Invasores de Nuevo León
- Los Mismos
- Los Nocheros
- Los Originales de San Juan
- Los Parientes
- Los Payasónicos
- Los Traileros del Norte
- Lunna
- Martina Stoessel
- Mazz
- Miranda!
- Moderatto
- Myriam
- Myriam Hernández
- Ninel Conde
- Natusha
- Obie Bermúdez
- Pablo Alborán
- Paco Barron y Sus Norteños Clan
- Panda
- Paty Cantú
- Paulina Rubio
- Pedro Fernández
- Pete Astudillo
- Pilar Montenegro
- Plácido Domingo
- Plastilina Mosh
- Proyecto M
- Ramón Ayala y Sus Bravos Del Norte
- Raphael
- RBD
- Ricardo Montaner
- Selena
- Shaila Dúrcal
- Soraya
- Thalía
- Tiziano Ferro
- Tony Touch
- Toquinho
- Verónica Orozco
- Vicente Garcia
- Vico C
- Voces del Rancho
- Volumen X
- Yaire
- Zoé
- Robert Fortuna

== See also ==
- List of EMI labels
- List of Universal Music Group labels
