= Perdición =

Single by La 5ª Estación

from the album Primera Toma
- Released: 2002
- Recorded: 2002
- Genre: Latin pop
- Length: 4:04
- Label: RCA
- Songwriter: Natalia Jiménez

La 5ª Estación singles chronology
"Perdición" (2002)	"Dónde Irán" (2002)

"Perdición" (Perdiction) is a song recorded and performed by Spanish/Mexican pop rock group La 5ª Estación. The song is the first of three radio singles from the band's debut studio album, Primera Toma. An acoustic version was later released as a single for the band's Acústico (La 5ª Estación album) album.

== Charts ==
Chart (2006)	Peak position
US Hot Latin Songs (Billboard); Acoustic version	24
US Latin Pop Airplay (Billboard); Acoustic version	6
