= Sin Frenos =

Studio album by La Quinta Estación
- Released: March 3, 2009
- Genres: Latin Pop, Rock
- Length: 46:17
- Label: Sony Music
- Producer: Armando Ávila

La Quinta Estación chronology
El Mundo Se Equivoca (2006)	Sin Frenos (2009)

Singles from Sin Frenos
- 1. "Que te Quería" Released: January 5, 2009; 2. "Recuérdame" Released: April 30, 2009; 3. "Me Dueles" Released: August 18, 2009

Professional ratings
Review scores
Source	Rating
Allmusic	3.5/5 stars

Sin Frenos (Without Brakes) is the fourth and final studio album release from the Spanish music duo, La 5ª Estación. The album received a Grammy Award for "Best Latin Pop Album" in 2010.

== Album information ==
During the summer of 2008, the release of Sin Frenos was set for October. Throughout the end of 2008, rumors circulated of a break-up of the then three members of La 5ª Estación, but were denied by the group's vocalist Natalia Jiménez. In December, the release of the CD was confirmed for March 2009, along with the confirmation that long-time member Pablo Domínguez (guitar and bass) would leave the group to join a group named Siete Horas. The first single Que te Quería was released on January 5, 2009, later releasing a music video for the song on January 21. Natalia Jiménez described the new CD as a little different still retaining their Pop/Rock style, but having half the tracks be more rockish and less gloomy and the other half a more Latin Mexican sound. The CD included 12 songs, half from Ángel Reyero (guitar) and half from Natalia Jiménez. Four songs: Que Te Quería, Mis Labios Por Tus Piernas, Esta Noche No, and Sin Salida were produced by Tom Lord Alge. The CD contains a duet with Marc Anthony titled Recuérdame. The iTunes edition of the album included a bonus pre-order track titled Es Cierto. The album received a 2009 Latin Grammy nomination for Best Pop Album by a Duo/Group with Vocals.

== Track listing ==
#	Song	Translation	Composers	Duration
1	Que te Quería	That I Loved You	Ángel Reyero / Armando Ávila	3:49
2	Me Dueles	You Hurt Me	Natalia Jiménez / Armando Ávila	3:27
3	Mis Labios Por Tus Piernas	My Lips Over Your Legs	Ángel Reyero / Armando Ávila	3:24
4	Te Quiero	I Love You	Natalia Jiménez / Armando Ávila	3:35
5	Sin Frenos	Without Brakes	Ángel Reyero / Armando Ávila	3:33
6	Recuérdame	Remember Me	Natalia Jiménez / Armando Ávila	3:27
7	Esta Noche No	Not Tonight	Ángel Reyero	3:40
8	Es Cierto	It's True	Natalia Jiménez / Armando Ávila	3:36
9	Te Supieron A Poco	They Tasted Insignifagant	Ángel Reyero	3:40
10	Quiéreme Mucho	Love Me So Much	Natalia Jiménez / Armando Ávila	3:48
11	Engañame	Lie To Me	Natalia Jiménez / Armando Ávila	3:10
12	Sin Salida	Without An Exit	Ángel Reyero / Armando Ávila	3:13
13	Recuérdame ft. Marc Anthony	Remember Me	Natalia Jiménez / Armando Ávila	4:06

Track listing confirmed on CDUniverse.com

== Singles ==
Year	Title	Chart positions		
Year	Title	U.S.^{HLT}	U.S. Latin^{POP}	SPA
2009	"Que te Quería"	4	1	4
2009	"Recuérdame (ft. Marc Anthony)	5	3	8
2009	Me Dueles			

== Release history ==
Region	Date
Mexico	March 3, 2009
Spain	March 10, 2009
United States	March 17, 2009

== Charts and certifications ==
=== Charts ===
Chart (2009)	Peak position
Argentina Albums Chart	7
Mexican Albums Chart	3
Spanish Albums (Promusicae)	2
U.S. Billboard 200	120
U.S. Billboard Top Latin Albums	1
U.S. Billboard Latin Pop Albums	1
Venezuela Albums Chart	1

=== Certifications ===
Region	Certification	Certified units/sales
Mexico (AMPROFON)	Gold	40,000^{^}
Spain (Promusicae)	Gold	40,000^{^}
^{^} Shipments figures based on certification alone.

== Accolades ==
Sin Frenos was nominated in the 2009 Latin Grammy Awards for best record by a Pop duo/group, but lost to Reik's Un Dia Más. On January 31, 2010, the album took home the Grammy Award for Best Latin Pop Album. It also received the "Pop Album of the Year" award at the Premio Lo Nuestro 2010 awards.
