= La Novela =

Studio album by Akwid
- Released: March 4, 2008
- Recorded: 2007–2008
- Genre: Hip hop, Latin rap
- Label: Univision
- Producer: Akwid

Akwid chronology
E.S.L. (2006)	La Novela (2008)	Clasificado R (2010)

La Novela is the fifth studio album by Akwid, released in March 2008. Special guests include Voces del Rancho, Fidel Rueda, Raul Hernandez, Los Tucanes de Tijuana, Rocio Saldoval "La Peligrosa", El Flaco Elizalde, Palomo, Jenni Rivera, Kuky, and Chino XL. It received a nomination for Best Latin Urban Album at the Grammy Awards of 2009.

== Track listing ==
#	Title	Producer(s)	Featured guest(s)	Sample(s)	Time
1	Intro	Francisco "Wikid" Gómez			1:04
2	"La Novela"	Francisco "Wikid" Gómez	Voces del Rancho		3:40
3	"No Tengo Padre"	Francisco "Wikid" Gómez			4:43
4	"Traigo la Muerte a Mi Lado"	Francisco "Wikid" Gómez	Fidel Rueda		3:55
5	"Sin Fortuna"	Francisco "Wikid" Gómez	Raul Hernandez		4:42
6	"Ombligo a Ombligo"	Francisco "Wikid" Gómez	Los Tucanes de Tijuana		4:02
7	"Solo Contigo"	Francisco "Wikid" Gómez	Rocio Sandoval La Peligrosa		4:02
8	La Duda	Francisco "Wikid" Gómez			1:34
9	"Desde La Prision"	Francisco "Wikid" Gómez	El Flaco Elizalde		4:10
10	"Perdido en el Alcohol"	Francisco "Wikid" Gómez	Palomo		4:39
11	"Me Siento Libre"	Francisco "Wikid" Gómez	Jenny Rivera		4:16
12	"Amigo"	Francisco "Wikid" Gómez			3:57
14	"Ombligo a Ombligo" (Bad Girl Remix)	Francisco "Wikid" Gómez	Kuky & Chino XL		4:05

== Charts ==
=== Weekly charts ===
Chart (2008)	Peak position
US Billboard 200	196
US Top Latin Albums (Billboard)	10
US Latin Rhythm Albums (Billboard)	3

=== Year-end charts ===
Chart (2008)	Position
US Top Latin Albums (Billboard)	62

== Sales and certifications ==
Region	Certification	Certified units/sales
United States (RIAA)	Gold (Latin)	50,000^{^}
^{^} Shipments figures based on certification alone.
