= Tu Peor Error =

Single by La 5ª Estación

from the album El Mundo Se Equivoca
- Released: 2006
- Recorded: 2006
- Genre: Pop rock
- Length: 2:47
- Label: Sony
- Songwriters: Angel Reyero, Armando Ávila
- Producer: Armando Avila

La 5ª Estación singles chronology
"Niña" (2006)	"Tu Peor Error" (2006)	"Me Muero" (2006)

"Tu Peor Error" ("Your Worst Mistake") is a song recorded and performed by Spanish pop rock group La 5ª Estación. The song is the first radio single from the band's third studio album, El Mundo Se Equivoca. "Tu Peor Error" reached the number 1 position on the Spanish singles chart in 2006.

== Track listing ==
1. "Tu Peor Error" – 2:47 (Avila, Reyero)

== Charts ==
Chart (2005)	Peak position
Spain (Los 40 Principales)	17
US Hot Latin Songs (Billboard)	3
US Latin Pop Airplay (Billboard)	18
Venezuela (National-Report)	5

== Certifications ==
Region	Certification	Certified units/sales
Mexico (AMPROFON) Ringtone	Gold	10,000^{*}
^{*} Sales figures based on certification alone.
