= Betzaida =

American singer

Betzaida (born March 16, 1982) is an American singer of Latin pop music and regional Mexican music. Born in Chicago, Illinois, to Puerto Rican and Mexican parents, Betzaida released her debut self-titled album in 2004 on Fonovisa Records. She first gained fame through her song "La Copa Será Tuya Al Final" which aired on Univision to promote Copa América 2004. Her song "No Te Quiero Olvidar" was nominated for "Latin Dance Club Play Track Of The Year" at the 2006 Latin Billboard Music Awards. In 2007, Betzaida released her second album, titled Te Quiero Así. She recently participated in La Voz Mexico (The Voice Mexico Edition) 2014.
