= Proyecto Akwid =

Studio album by Akwid
- Released: June 10, 2003
- Recorded: 2003
- Genre: Mexican hip-hop
- Length: 42:38
- Label: Univision

Akwid chronology
Akwid A.D. (2002)	Proyecto Akwid (2003)	Komp 104.9 Radio Compa (2004)

Professional ratings
Review scores
Source	Rating
AllMusic	4/5 stars

Proyecto Akwid is the second studio album by Mexican-American rap duo Akwid. It was released on June 10, 2003 via Univision Records, marking their debut for the label. It features guest appearances from Adán "Chalino" Sánchez and Jenni Rivera.

In the United States, the album peaked at number 7 on the Top Latin Albums, number 3 on the Regional Mexican Albums and number 16 on the Heatseekers Albums charts.

It received nominations for a Grammy Award for Best Latin Rock or Alternative Album at the 46th Annual Grammy Awards, a Best Urban Music Album at the 5th Annual Latin Grammy Awards, and a Lo Nuestro Award for Urban Album of the Year at the Premio Lo Nuestro 2004.

Jason Roberts' remix of "No Hay Manera" was used in the video game Midnight Club LA Remix.

== Track listing ==
No.	Title	Length
1.	"Un Plan" (Intro)	0:53
2.	"No Hay Manera"	4:03
3.	"Es Mi Gusto"	3:35
4.	"Taquito de Ojo" (featuring Jenni Rivera)	4:27
5.	"Pobre Compa"	4:03
6.	"Un Minutito" (Insert)	0:34
7.	"Subir Arriba"	3:38
8.	"A Pesar de Todo" (featuring Adán Sánchez)	3:55
9.	"Siempre Ausente"	3:54
10.	"Sin Ti"	4:26
11.	"Hollywooood"	4:06
12.	"Eso Es Todo" (Outro)	0:25
13.	"No Hay Manera (Jason Roberts Remix)" (Bonus Track)	4:39
Total length:		42:38

== Charts ==
Chart (2003)	Peak position
US Top Latin Albums (Billboard)	7
US Regional Mexican Albums (Billboard)	3
US Heatseekers Albums (Billboard)	16

== Certifications ==
Region	Certification	Certified units/sales
Mexico (AMPROFON)	Gold	50,000^{^}
United States (RIAA)	2× Platinum (Latin)	200,000^{^}
^{^} Shipments figures based on certification alone.
