= Dónde Irán =

"¿Dónde Irán?"

Single by La 5ª Estación

from the album Primera toma
- Released: 2002
- Recorded: February – March 2002
- Genre: Latin pop
- Length: 3:20
- Label: RCA International
- Songwriters: Pablo Domínguez, Natalia Jiménez, Sven Martín, Angel Reyero

La 5ª Estación singles chronology
"Perdición" (2002)	"¿Dónde Irán?" (2002)	"No Quiero Perderte" (2002)

"Dónde Irán" (Where will they go) is La 5ª Estación's second single release from their first studio album, Primera toma.

The song was used as the theme to the Mexican telenovela, Clase 406, the soap opera before Rebelde.
