= Que te Quería =

Single by La 5ª Estación

from the album Sin Frenos
- Released: January 5, 2009
- Genre: Latin pop, Pop rock
- Length: 3:53
- Label: Sony International
- Songwriters: Ángel Reyero; Armando Avila
- Producer: Armando Avila

La 5ª Estación singles chronology
"La Frase Tonta De La Semana" (2008)	"Que te Quería" (2009)	"Recuérdame" (2009)

Que te Quería (Spanish for "That I Loved You") is La 5ª Estación's first single released from their fourth studio album, Sin Frenos.

== Song information ==
This was La Quinta Estacion's first single as a duo.

Angel Reyero, composer and band member, comments:

"Es la canción que abre el disco y es muy distinta, más rockera a lo que habíamos hecho hasta ahora y habla de una relación pasada de alguien que intenta apegarse a algo que ya no es"

(Translation) "It's the song that opens the disc and it's very different, it's more rock than any other we have done to this point and it talks about a past relationship of someone who tries to cling on to something that is no longer there."

== Music video ==
Jorge Abarca, directed the music video of Que te Quería using a special camera called Phantom, a type of special equipment to record high quality images. This helped the special effects to be more focused and better seen. The music video does not have a story, but includes lots effects such as rain and real flames. Natalia and Angel were supervised, but where very close to the flames. Natalia's dress kept undoing and her hair puff up. The dress Natalia was wearing was not an actual dress, but was made quickly using a red fabric. The video is very dark and moody representing the "world" one feels when broken up in a relationship. The video took 20 hours to complete and premiered exclusively to Ritmoson on Jan. 21, 2009.

== Charts ==
Chart	Peak
Mexico (Monitor Latino)	1
Spain (PROMUSICAE)	4
US Hot Latin Songs (Billboard)	4
US Latin Pop Airplay (Billboard)	1
US Latin Rhythm Airplay (Billboard)	25

== Sales and certifications ==
Region	Certification	Certified units/sales
Spain (Promusicae)	Platinum	40,000^{*}
^{*} Sales figures based on certification alone.

== See also ==
- List of number-one songs of 2009 (Mexico)
