= Primera Toma =

Studio album by La 5ª Estación
- Released: May 3, 2002
- Recorded: 2002 (Madrid, Spain)
- Genre: Latin pop/rock
- Labels: Ariola; BMG

La 5ª Estación chronology
Primera Toma (2002)	Flores de Alquiler (2004)

Singles from Primera Toma
- 1. "Perdición" Released: March 11, 2002; 2. "Dónde Irán" Released: June 3, 2002; 3. "No Quiero Perderte" Released: October 7, 2002

Professional ratings
Review scores
Source	Rating
Allmusic	2.5/5 stars

Primera Toma (Take One) is the first studio album release from the Spanish music trio, La 5ª Estación. It was released in 2002 in Mexico only. The album was initially not well received due to La 5ª Estación's lack of notoriety. However, the album managed to become a hit when the song, "¿Dónde Irán?", was used as the opening theme song for the telenovela, Clase 406. This promotion was their first breakthrough in Latin America and the United States. The song was then chosen as the debut single for the band and was also their first commercial hit in Mexico. After the release of their debut single, La 5ª Estación released two more successful singles from Primera Toma, which were "Perdición" and "No Quiero Perderte".

== Track listing ==
#	Song	Translation	Duration
1	Dónde Irán	Where Will They Go	3:20
2	No Quiero Perderte	I Don't Want to Lose You	2:47
3	Ayer	Yesterday	2:15
4	Sólo Es Un Minuto	It's Only a Minute	2:55
5	Cinco Estaciones	Five Seasons	3:12
6	Perdición	Perdition	3:41
7	Perdiendo el Control	Losing Control	3:19
8	Nada Será Igual	Nothing Will Be the Same	3:05
9	Cuando Acaba la Noche	When the Night Ends	3:36
10	Cerca de Ti	Close to You	2:32
11	Coma	Coma	3:05
12	Todo Se Vuelve Extraño	Everything Becomes Strange	3:08
13	Contigo Sí (version acustica)	With You Yes (acoustic version)	2:11
