= Me Muero =

Single by La 5ª Estación

from the album El Mundo Se Equivoca
- Released: 2006
- Recorded: 2006
- Genre: Latin pop
- Length: 3:09
- Label: Sony International
- Songwriters: Armando Avila; Natalia Jimenez
- Producer: Armando Avila

La 5ª Estación singles chronology
"Tu Peor Error" (2006)	"Me Muero" (2006)	"Sueños Rotos" (2007)

"Me Muero" (Spanish for "I Die" or "I Am Dying") is La 5ª Estación's second single release from their third studio album, El mundo se equivoca.

== Background ==
"Me Muero" was officially released to American and Latin American radio towards the end of 2006. In Mexico, the song topped the official singles chart for eleven weeks in a row, eventually being succeeded by Julieta Venegas' "Eres para mí". In the United States, the song peaked at number two on the Latin Pop Airplay chart and number ten on the Hot Latin Tracks chart. In Spain, the song peaked at number two. According to Promusicae, "Me Muero" has been certified 6× Platinum in Spain for sales of over 120,000 units, being one of the big hits from 2007 in that country.

== Music video ==
The music video for "Me Muero" begins with what appears as a fan cutting and pasting pictures of a wrestling star. The collage album is then given to the wrestler and he reflects on it while he faces a match. La 5ª Estación is shown singing from the ring in the arena. The supposed fan then shows up to the match as sign of support. Finally a scene is shown where the two kiss and it is revealed that the fan was actually the wrestler's wife. The main wrestler in the video is Mexican professional wrestler, Místico.

== Charts ==
"Me Muero"

Chart (2006)	Peak position
Mexico (Billboard Mexican Airplay)	46
Spanish Singles Chart	2
Spanish Airplay Chart	1
US Hot Latin Songs (Billboard)	10
US Latin Pop Airplay (Billboard)	2
US Latin Rhythm Airplay (Billboard)	38

== Certifications ==
Region	Certification	Certified units/sales
Mexico (AMPROFON) Ringtone	Platinum	25,000^{*}
Spain (Promusicae)	6× Platinum	120,000^{*}
^{*} Sales figures based on certification alone.
