= Y Seguimos con Duranguense =

Studio album by Los Horóscopos de Durango
- Released: 1 March 2005
- Genre: Duranguense
- Length: 35:38
- Language: Spanish
- Label: Disa

Los Horóscopos de Durango chronology
Con Sabor a Polkas (2005)	Y Seguimos con Duranguense (2005)	En Vivo Gira México 2005 (2005)

Y Seguimos con Duranguense (transl. And We Continue with Duranguense) is a studio album by duranguense band Los Horóscopos de Durango. It was released on 1 March 2005, through Disa Records.

== Reception ==
Professional ratings
Review scores
Source	Rating
AllMusic	4/5 stars

In a positive review by Alex Henderson of AllMusic, they found the band's versatility of combining duranguense music with different genres, including rancheras and cumbias, to be creative and stated that "it will easily go down in history as one of the most interesting duranguense releases of 2005". The album won the award for Regional Mexican Album of the Year, by a female artist or group, at the 2006 Billboard Latin Music Awards.

== Track listing ==
Y Seguimos con Duranguense track listing
No.	Title	Writer(s)	Length
1.	"Si La Quieres"	Ricky Vela	2:46
2.	"Que Vuelva"	Alberto Mercado	4:18
3.	"Oiga"	Joan Sebastian	3:23
4.	"Adios Mi Tierra"	Jose Antonio Melendez	2:46
5.	"Que Manera de Perder"	Cuco Sánchez	2:32
6.	"Debes Volver"	Keith Nieto	3:03
7.	"Y Yo Sigo Aquí"	Estéfano	2:48
8.	"Volveré Junto a Ti"	Laura Pausini	3:00
9.	"La Araña"	José Alfredo Jiménez Sandoval	2:26
10.	"El Media Noche"	Jose Antonio Melendez	2:33
11.	"Anoche Estuve Llorando"	Sánchez	2:29
12.	"Obsesión"	Anthony "Romeo" Santos	3:34
Total length:			35:38

== Charts ==
Chart performance for Y Seguimos con Duranguense
Chart (2005)	Peak position
US Billboard 200	78
US Regional Mexican Albums (Billboard)	1
US Top Latin Albums (Billboard)	2

== Certifications ==
Certifications for Y Seguimos con Duranguense
Region	Certification	Certified units/sales
United States (RIAA)	2× Platinum (Latin)	200,000^{^}
^{^} Shipments figures based on certification alone.
