= Recuérdame (La Quinta Estación song) =

Single by La 5ª Estación featuring Marc Anthony

from the album Sin Frenos
- Released: May 16, 2009
- Genre: Latin pop, Pop rock
- Length: 34:03
- Label: Sony International
- Songwriters: Ángel Reyero; Armando Avila
- Producer: Armando Avila

La 5ª Estación featuring Marc Anthony singles chronology
"Que te Quería" (2009)	"Recuérdame" (2009)	"Me Dueles" (2009)

Marc Anthony singles chronology
"Escandalo" (2008)	"Recuérdame" (2009)	"Armada Latina" (2010)

"Recuérdame" ("Remember Me") is La 5ª Estación's second single released from their fourth studio album, Sin Frenos. It features American singer Marc Anthony. The music video was directed by Simon Brand and received a Lo Nuestro nomination for Video of the Year.

== Charts ==
Chart (2009)	Peak
Mexico (Billboard Mexican Airplay)	6
Spain (PROMUSICAE)	5
US Hot Latin Songs (Billboard)	5
US Latin Pop Songs (Billboard)	3
US Latin Rhythm Airplay (Billboard)	38
US Tropical Airplay (Billboard)	11

== Sales and certifications ==
Region	Certification	Certified units/sales
Spain (Promusicae)	2× Platinum	80,000^{*}
^{*} Sales figures based on certification alone.
