= Sueños Rotos =

"Sueños rotos"

Single by La 5ª Estación

from the album El Mundo Se Equivoca
- Released: 2007
- Recorded: 2006
- Genre: Latin pop
- Length: 4:10
- Label: Sony International
- Songwriter: Pablo Domingez
- Producer: Armando Avila

La 5ª Estación singles chronology
"Me Muero" (2006)	"Sueños rotos" (2007)	"Ahora Que Te Vas" (2007)

"Sueños Rotos" (Broken Dreams) is La 5ª Estación's third single released from their third studio album, El mundo se equivoca.

== Song information ==
"Sueños Rotos" was released in May 2007 and was released in Mexico and Spain only, meanwhile "Ahora Que Te Vas" was as the third American single. In Spain, the song was released to radio in late September. It debuted on the Spanish airplay chart at number nine on October 2, 2007. The song has debuted on the Spanish singles chart and has so far peaked at a position of fifteen. It has also been certified Gold for sales of over 10,000 units.

== Music video ==
The music video for Sueños Rotos was directed by Ricardo Calderón in May 2007. The video is noted for not including a type of story in it. Many found this exception strange as every music video released by La 5ª Estación has a meaning and a story. An article posted by LasNoticiasMexico.com reported that the band did not regret having a different type of video for the song since this video shows the different characteristics of each of the bandmates, however it was also explained the group misses the videos with stories and there are chances of bringing the old themes back for future music videos. In this video it is also noted that none of the group members are holding any instruments, this being odd as they have in the last two music videos.

== Charts ==
Chart (2007)	Peak position
Spanish Singles Chart	15
Spanish Airplay Chart	3
US Latin Pop Airplay (Billboard)	27
