= El Mundo Se Equivoca =

Studio album by La 5ª Estación
- Released: August 22, 2006
- Recorded: 2006
- Genre: Latin Pop/Rock
- Labels: Ariola; Sony BMG
- Producer: Armando Ávila

La 5ª Estación chronology
Acústico (2005)	El Mundo Se Equivoca (2006)	Sin Frenos (2009)

Singles from El Mundo Se Equivoca
- 1. "Tu Peor Error"; 2. "Me Muero"; 3. "Sueños Rotos"; 4. "Ahora Que Te Vas U.S Only"; 5. "La Frase Tonta De La Semana"

Professional ratings
Review scores
Source	Rating
Allmusic	4/5 stars

El Mundo Se Equivoca (The World Is Mistaken) is the third studio album release from the Spanish music trio, La 5ª Estación. The album received a Latin Grammy Award on November 8, 2007, for Best Pop Album by a Duo/Group with Vocals.

== Content ==
It was released worldwide on August 22, 2006. It includes thirteen tracks and is the band's first album to be published under the dual disc format, containing on the video side, the behind the cameras of the album's recording.

In 2006, La 5ª Estación released "Tu Peor Error" (Your Worst Mistake) as the first single for the album. The single peaked at number three in Mexico and in the top-twenty in the Billboard Hot Latin Tracks. "Me muero" (I'm Dying) was released as the second single from El mundo se equivoca, the song reached number ten in the Hot Latin Tracks chart. In Mexico, the song topped the national singles chart for twelve weeks and it was succeeded by Eres para mi by Julieta Venegas. As of April 2007, the newest single released to Mexican radio is "Sueños rotos" (Broken Dreams), the song debuted at number ninety-three on May 7, 2007.

== Track listing ==
#	Song	Translation	Composers	Duration
1	Tu Peor Error	Your Worst Mistake	Avila; Reyero	2:47
2	Ahora Que Te Vas	Now That You're Leaving	Dominguez; Vargas	3:48
3	Me Muero	I'm Dying	Avila; Jimenez	3:09
4	Para No Decirte Adiós	For Not Saying Goodbye	Reyero	3:34
5	Sueños Rotos	Broken Dreams	Dominguez	4:10
6	Nada	Nothing	Avila; Dominguez; Reyero	3:14
7	Cosa de Dos	Thing of Two	Avila; Reyero	3:35
8	La Frase Tonta de la Semana	The Dumb Phrase of the Week	Norberto Ross (Cubano)	4:03
9	Que Fuí para Ti	What Was I for You	Jimenez	3:42
10	Cartas	Letters	Reyero	3:46
11	El Amor No Duele	Love Doesn't Hurt	Avila; Jimenez	3:04
12	Tan Sólo Quiero Amarte	I Only Want to Love You	Jimenez	3:21
13	Así Eres	That's How you are	Jimenez	3:50

== Singles ==
Year	Title	Chart positions		
Year	Title	U.S.^{HLT}	U.S.^{POP}	SPA
2006	"Tu Peor Error"	18	17	17
2006	"Me Muero"	10	1	1
2007	"Sueños Rotos"	-	-	1
2007	"Ahora Que Te Vás"	26	6	-
2008	"La Frase Tonta de la Semana"	-	-	-

== Charts and certifications ==
=== Charts ===
Chart (2006)	Peak position
U.S. Billboard Top Heatseekers	16
U.S. Billboard Top Latin Albums	13
U.S. Billboard Latin Pop Albums	3
Mexican Albums Chart	6
Spanish Albums Chart	3

=== Certifications ===
Region	Certification	Certified units/sales
Mexico (AMPROFON)	Platinum+Gold	150,000^{^}
Spain (Promusicae)	2× Platinum	160,000^{^}
United States (RIAA)	Platinum (Latin)	100,000^{^}
^{^} Shipments figures based on certification alone.
