= Akwid =

Mexican-American hip hop group

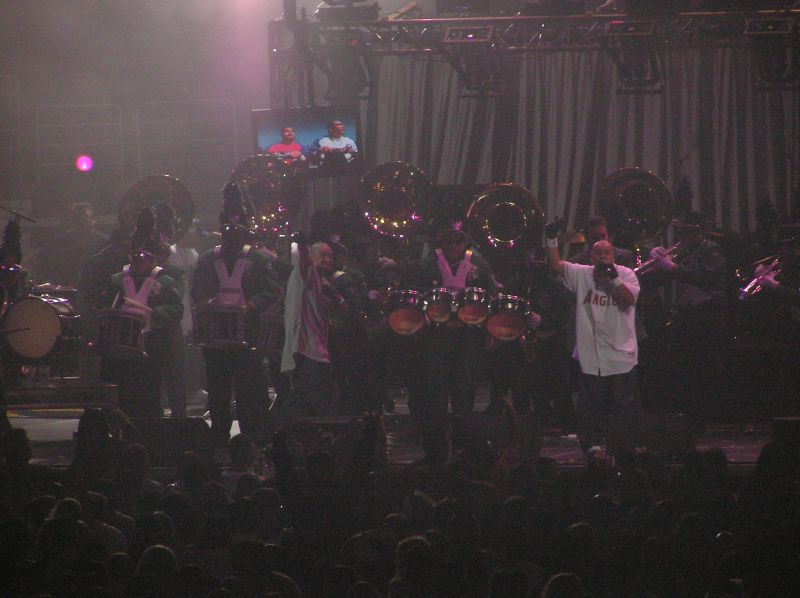
- Akwid performing in California in 2004.

Background information
- Origin: Los Angeles, California
- Genres: Chicano rap, Latin hip hop, Latin, rap, hip hop, West coast hip hop, Banda (music)
- Years active: 1992–present
- Labels: Universal/Machete (2008-Present); Univision Music Group (previously)
- Members: Sergio Gómez; Francisco Gómez
- Website: www.akwid.com

Akwid is a Chicano rap group. Brothers Francisco "AK" Gómez and Sergio "Wikid" Gómez, who make up Akwid, are originally from Jiquilpan, Michoacán, but grew up in Los Angeles, California. Before becoming Akwid both "AK" and "Wikid" were part of a former rap group named the "Head Knockerz" with other group members Sabu and John Doe

== Early life ==
Sergio and Francisco Gómez were born in Jiquilpan, Michoacán, Mexico. Relocated to the United States of America at the ages of five and three years. They grew up a mile West from Downtown LA in an area now known as Westlake South. Sergio Gomez and his siblings attended 10th St Elementary and Berendo Junior High.

== Discography ==
Their First album, Proyecto Akwid, won two Billboard Prizes and a Latin Grammy Award for Best Latin Rock/Alternative Album.

Their 2004 album Hoy, Ayer, and Forever remixes several songs from the album 2002 A.D. using their more recent style, incorporating regional Mexican music. Their 2004 album KOMP 104.9 Radio Compa is in the form of a broadcast on a fictitious radio station that plays only Akwid, and their 2005 album Los Aguacates De Jiquilpan is in the form of a fairy tale explaining their arrival from Mexico to the U.S.. They are currently signed to Universal's Machete Music.

Prior to the team's dissolution, their song, "¡Chivas Explosivas!" was the official anthem for Club Deportivo Chivas USA of Major League Soccer.

Akwid's music, such as their song "No Hay Manera," has had heavy cultural and musical impact, and was part of a Mexicanization of Los Angeles into "Nuevo L.A." "No Hay Manera" first became popular in 2003, and was played on both U.S. urban and Mexican regional radios, which, at the time, was a breakthrough for Mexican-American hip-hop. Furthermore, "No Hay Manera" began the slow addition of hip-hop into Mexican music. The song features rapping, in Spanish, over a distinctly Mexican style of band music. Ethnomusicologist Josh Kun separates "No Hay Manera" into three different musical layers: the hip-hop style lyrics, the use of a banda orquesta sample, and the use of "Te Lo Pido Por Favor." Each of these layers has its own influences, and all together, create a hybrid of Mexican and American styles. The lyrics of the song draw heavily from an African-American hip-hop style, and also from the popular Chicano style of rapping. The banda orquesta, on the other hand, is a Mexican band that mixes the structure and sound of American big bands with Mexican orchestras, and quickly became the symbolic music of Mexicans living in the U.S. in the 1990s. Lastly, "Te Lo Pido Por Favor," sung by Juan Gabriel, was regarded as a national symbol of Mexican music. Its use indicated a meshing of Mexican and American identity. These layers are important, because Los Angeles was the center of Mexican and African American or American music. Akwid's music is a representation of the strong Mexican identity within Mexican-Americans living in the United States. Unlike many other immigrants, Mexicans retain a deep connection with Mexico, and frequently visit the country or send money back home. Kun calls this a cross-border continuum, in that Mexican immigration to the United States is circular rather than one-way. Mexican immigrants themselves were also very reluctant to give up their culture and assimilate into the United States. In "No Hay Manera," Akwid raps about refusing to assimilate, and reconnecting with their Mexican roots. Overall, Akwid's music is representative of the cultural hybridity occurring in Los Angeles in the late 20th century.

In 2015 they publicly release their new album called "el atraco", they also promote "previews" of its possible content. However said album so far has never really been published; On multiple occasions the Akwid group has committed to their fans to release it for sale, but this has only been fallacious. Due to the above, it is rumored that the Akwid group presents economic, administrative and even legal obstacles (Copyright) to start its projects.

On May 3, 2019, the official video of the "single" called "akwid suena" is publicly released on the YouTube platform. In the same way; On September 27, 2019, the official video of the song "voy a 90" is publicly released on the YouTube platform, this with the collaboration of Joan Elite.

On March 10, 2020, the song premieres on the YouTube platform; "gallo de pelea", featuring Akwid, in collaboration with Neto Peña and Santa Fe Klan.

=== Studio albums ===
• The Akwid Proyect (2-k Sounds, 2001 )

- Akwid A.D (Univision, 2002)
- Proyecto Akwid (Univision, 2003)
- KOMP 104.9 Radio Compa (Univision, 2004)
- Los Aguacates de Jiquilpan (Univision, 2005)
- E.S.L. (Univision, 2006)...
- La Novela (Univision, 2008)
- Clasificado "R" (Machete Music, 2010)
- Ready Hits 21 Limited Edition ( Platino Records 2011)
- Revólver (Diwka, 2013)
- El Atraco Vol -1 (Diwka, coming soon)

=== Compilations ===
- El Movimiento Del Hip Hop (2003)
- El Movimiento Del Hip Hop Vol 2

(2004)

- The Crossover (2-k Sounds, 2004)
- Hoy, Ayer, y and Forever (2-k Sounds, 2004)
- Siempre (2-k Sounds, 2004)
- Kickin' It Juntos (con Jae-P), Univision, 2005)
- Still Kickin' It (con Jae-P), (Univision, 2005)
- Live in Japan (Univision, 2006)
- Dos En Uno (Univision, 2006)
- Greatest Éxitos (Univision, 2007)
- No Hay Manera y Muchos Éxitos Mas: Línea de Oro (Univision, 2007)
