= Dueto Voces del Rancho =

Regional Mexican band

Dueto Las Voces del Rancho
- Origin: Los Angeles
- Genres: Regional Mexican
- Years active: 1995–present
- Label: Univision
- Members: Edgar Rodríguez; Mariano Fernández

Dueto Las Voces del Rancho (Spanish: The Two Voices of the Ranch) is a Regional Mexican band. It is a duo whose members are Edgar Rodríguez and Mariano Fernández. They play many traditional song styles, but with a uniquely contemporary style.

== History ==
Dueto Las Voces del Rancho was founded in 2000 in Los Angeles, California. It all began with two young men: Edgar Rodríguez, born in Guadalajara, Jalisco; and Mariano Fernández, from Los Mochis, Sinaloa. Both of them were raised in the city of Bell, a city in the Los Angeles metropolitan area. With the help of Lupillo Rivera, a well-known Regional Mexican singer, they set up a band and began recording their first songs.

"Se Les Peló Baltazar" and "Los Dos Amigos" were Rodríguez's and Fernández's first hit singles. Soon, their popularity increased dramatically as their songs were played extensively on Regional Mexican radio. Los Dueto Voces del Rancho released other albums and songs, including the hits "El Lunar," "Dónde Están," and "De un Rancho a Otro".

Besides primarily being a Norteño band, Voces del Rancho have also played their songs with Regional Mexican artists of other subgenres, such as Banda.

== See also ==
- American norteño musicians
- Norteño music groups
