= La Quinta Estación =

Spanish band

La 5ª Estación
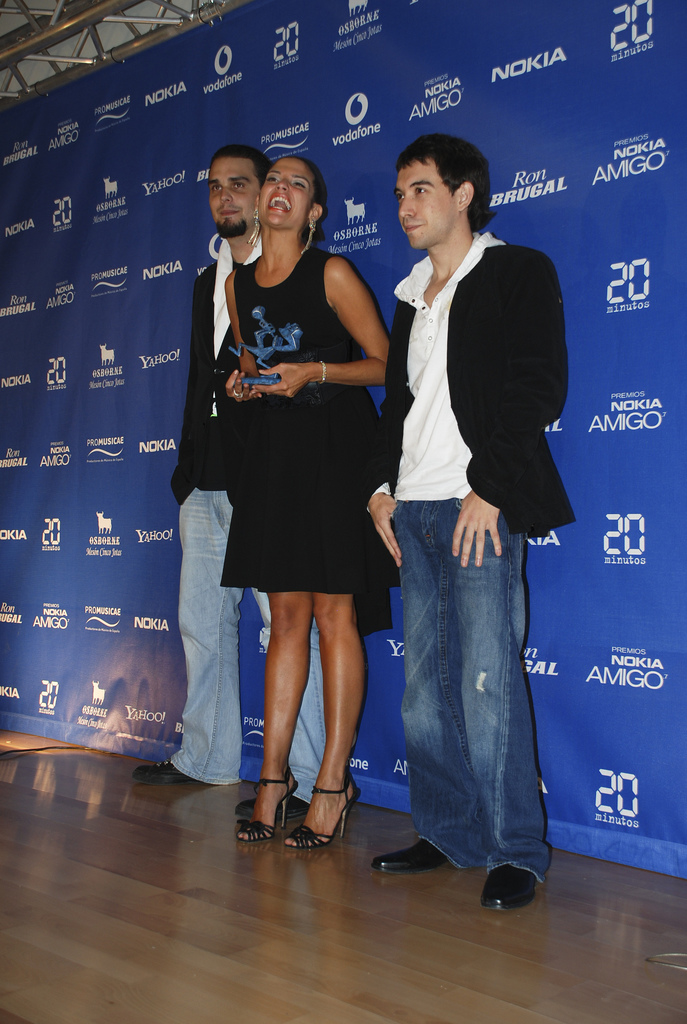

Background information
- Origin: Madrid, Spain
- Genres: Latin; Latin pop; folk-pop; pop rock
- Years active: 2000–2010; 2023–present
- Labels: Ariola; BMG; Sony Latin; Sony Music
- Members: Natalia Jiménez; Ángel Reyero
- Past members: Pablo Domínguez (2000–2008); Edward Paredes (2009–2014); Sven Martín (2000–2003)

La Quinta Estación (Spanish for "The Fifth Station", often spelled La 5ª Estación) is a Spanish pop rock band composed of two musicians from Madrid: Natalia Jiménez (lead singer and harmonica) and Ángel Reyero (guitar). Pablo Domínguez (guitar and bass) was the third member until his split in 2008 (Now in Varsovia). Sven Martín was the fourth member until his departure in 2003. The band originated in Madrid with six members but the remaining four relocated to Mexico in 2001 after signing with Ariola and began recording their debut album Primera toma ("Take #1") which was released in 2002.

== Career in Mexico ==
The first album of La Quinta Estación became popular in Mexico because one of the songs (¿Dónde Irán?, "Where will they go?") was chosen as theme song for Clase 406, one of the most popular telenovelas of Televisa in 2002. After touring the country to promote their album, they decided to stay permanently. In the same year, they performed Voy a pasármelo bien ("I'm going to have a good time") in the tribute-album to Hombres G and Si yo fuera mujer ("If I were a woman") for the soundtrack of Dame tu cuerpo, a Mexican film starred by Rafael Sánchez Navarro and Luis María Zetina.

In February 2004, the band released their second album Flores de Alquiler ("Leased Flowers") produced entirely in Mexico. The first single was El Sol No Regresa ("The Sun Doesn't Come Back") a rock song that begins with mariachi trumpets. This song talks about someone who attempts to drink away their heartbreak. The title line of the chorus translates to, "after several tequilas, the clouds go away but the sun doesn't come back". This song, as said by the band, is a tribute they made to Mexican people for being the start point of their careers.

Their second single Algo Más ("Something More", written by Natalia) talks about a feeling the author says is not love but it is "something more" that fulfills her and it is stronger than "distance, pain and nostalgia". The video for this song was recorded at a bar in the Historic District of Mexico City.

The video was directed by Alejandro Hernández, who also directed the video for El Sol No Regresa and its photography is in black and white. The scene and wardrobe are set in the 1950s and the band is seen performing at a nightclub with a couple enjoying the song and afterwards inspired by its lyrics leave their seats to caress each other.

The third single of the band was "Daría" ("I Would Give") which also met with great success, the video was filmed in Mexico City and reached No. 1 on the VH1 Latin America Top 20 and other charts in Latin America.

"Niña" ("Girl") was the latest single of the album. The video was quite controversial and also made it to the VH1's chart. This single was quite successful on Mexican radio. According to the band, this song was written for a disabled girl.

The first two singles caused the album to become a triple platinum album in Mexico and double gold in United States. And gold also in Puerto Rico and Spain. These two singles and Daría entered the Top 20 Billboard's Hot Latin Track list. This album was the first by the band released in Spain.

In 2005, they received more than 1.5 million votes to become Grupo Latino del año ("Latin band of the year") on the music video network Ritmoson of Televisa. On November 1 of the same year, the band released a CD/DVD compilation of their hits called Acústico.

In 2006, they released "Tu Peor Error" (Your Worst Mistake) the first single to their 3rd album "El Mundo Se Equivoca" (The World [as in people] Makes Mistakes). "Tu peor error" is also remarkable for being the band's first album publish in dual disc format, containing on the video side, the behind the cameras of the album's recording.

On March 16, 2007, the band performed for the first time at Mexico's most important venue, the National Auditorium (Auditorio Nacional), in Mexico City.

After seven years, La Quinta Estación's guitarist, Pablo Domínguez, decided it was time for him to leave the group and joined to Varsovia. La Quinta Estación's next studio album was released on March 3, 2009. The lead single is announced called ("Que Te Quería") and was released January 5, 2009.

The date of Sin Frenos was released in the United States on March 17, 2009.

On February 20, 2010, Cadena Dial (a Spanish radio station) falsely announced the "exclusive" news of the final separation of La Quinta Estación, i.e. breaking the duo Angel and Natalia.

On November 12, 2010, day after the Latin Grammys, Natalia Jimenez said La Quinta Estacion will still exist and that the two are simply looking into individual projects, but "one day we will release another album (as La Quinta Estacion)".

== Discography ==
=== Studio albums ===
Year	Title	Chart positions			Sales and certifications
Year	Title	United States	Mexico	Spain	Sales and certifications
2001	Primera Toma: First studio album; Released: December 3, 2001; Formats: CD	—	—	—	
2004	Flores de Alquiler: Second studio album; Released: June 22, 2004; Formats: CD, digital download	7	5	—	AMPROFON: Platinum+Gold; RIAA: 2× Platinum (Latin)
2006	El Mundo Se Equivoca: Third studio album; Released: August 22, 2006; Formats: CD, digital download	13	4	3	AMPROFON: Platinum+Gold; PROMUSICAE: 2× Platinum; RIAA: Platinum (Latin)
2009	Sin Frenos: Fourth studio album; Released: March 17, 2009; Formats: CD, digital download	1	3	2	AMPROFON: Gold; PROMUSICAE: Gold

=== Compilations and live albums ===
Year	Title	Chart positions			Sales and certifications
Year	Title	United States	Mexico	Spain	Sales and certifications
2005	Acústico: First live album; Released: November 1, 2005; Formats: CD, DVD	28	—	—	AMPROFON: Platinum
2007	La Quinta Estación (La Caja): Greatest hits collection; Released: November 27, 2007; Formats: CD, digital download	—	—	—	

Footnotes:

- ^{1} Based on the Billboard Top Latin Albums chart.

=== Special appearances ===
- 2002 – Clase 406 soundtrack
- 2002 – Tributo a los Hombres G
- 2003 – Dame Tu Cuerpo soundtrack
- 2004 – Rebelde – Temporada 1 Capitulo 45
- 2006 – Now Esto Es Musica! Latino

=== Singles ===
Year	Single	Peak chart positions							Certifications	Album
Year	Single	HLT	LPA	MEX	SPA	ARG	PER	COL	Certifications	Album
2002	"Dónde Irán"	—	—	—	—	—	—	—		Primera Toma
2002	"Perdición"	24	6	—	—	—	—	—		Primera Toma
2003	"No Quiero Perderte"	—	—	—	—	—	—	—		Primera Toma
2004	"El Sol No Regresa"	37	21	10	19	16	—	2		Flores de Alquiler
2005	"Algo Más"	3	2	1	32	10	—	1		Flores de Alquiler
2005	"Daría"	13	3	9	15	27	—	—		Flores de Alquiler
2006	"Niña"	—	36	19	—	—	—	—		Flores de Alquiler
2006	"Tu Peor Error"	18	17	3	16	16	64	3	AMPROFON: Gold	El Mundo Se Equivoca
2006	"Me Muero"	10	2	1	1	22	3	1	AMPROFON: Platinum; PROMUSICAE: 6× Platinum	El Mundo Se Equivoca
2007	"Sueños Rotos"	—	27	6	1	15	—	—		El Mundo Se Equivoca
2007	"Ahora Que Te Vas"	26	6	—	—	—	60	—		El Mundo Se Equivoca
2008	"La Frase Tonta de la Semana"	—	—	73	—	—	—	23		El Mundo Se Equivoca
2009	"Que te Quería"	4	1	1	1	14	—	2	PROMUSICAE: Platinum	Sin Frenos
2009	"Recuérdame" (featuring Marc Anthony)	5	3	28	8	100	—	1	PROMUSICAE: 2× Platinum	Sin Frenos
2009	"Me Dueles"	—	—	—	—	—	—	—		Sin Frenos

== Award nominations ==
=== 2010 Grammy Awards ===
- Best Latin Pop Album – (Sin Frenos) WON

=== 2009 Latin Grammy Awards ===
- Best Pop Album By a Duo or Group – (Sin Frenos)

=== 2007 Latin Grammy Awards ===
- Best Pop Album By a Duo or Group – (El Mundo Se Equivoca) WON

=== MTV Video Music Awards – Latinoamérica ===
- Best new artist – Mexico

=== 2006 Latin Grammy Awards ===
- Best Pop Album By a Duo or Group – (Acustico)

=== Oye! Awards ===
- Best Spanish musical group
