= Clase 406 =

Mexican telenovela

- Genre: Telenovela
- Based on: Francisco el Matemático by Diego Vivanco, Sandra Rita Paba and Ana María Parra
- Written by: María Cervantes Balmori; Pedro Armando Rodríguez; Alma Solís; María Luisa Solís; Alejandra Romero Meza; Iván Cuevas; Marimar Oliver
- Directed by: Luis Pardo; Juan Carlos Muñoz
- Starring: Jorge Poza; Irán Castillo; Sherlyn; Dulce María; Sara Maldonado; Christian Chávez; Alfonso Herrera; Aarón Díaz; Francisco Gattorno; Michelle Vieth
- Opening theme: "¿Donde irán?" by La Quinta Estación
- Country of origin: Mexico
- Original language: Spanish
- No. of seasons: 4
- No. of episodes: 349

Production
- Executive producer: Pedro Damián
- Producer: Luis Luisillo Miguel
- Production locations: Filming; Televisa San Ángel; Mexico City, Mexico; Locations; Mexico City, Mexico
- Cinematography: Vivian Sánchez Ross; Bernardo Nájera
- Camera setup: Multi-camera
- Running time: 41–44 minutes
- Production company: Televisa

Original release
- Network: Canal de las Estrellas
- Release: July 1, 2002 – October 31, 2003

Clase 406 (English title: Class 406) is a Mexican telenovela produced by Pedro Damián for Televisa, broadcast by Canal de las Estrellas (now known simply as Las Estrellas). It is a remake of the Colombian telenovela Francisco, El Matemático (1999). Clase 406 originally aired from Monday, July 1, 2002, to Friday October 31, 2003. The story deals with the problems of newer Latino youth in general like sex, drug dealing, abuse, drinking, rape, deception, and heartbreak.

Jorge Poza, Irán Castillo, Anahí, Sherlyn, Dulce María, Sara Maldonado, Christian Chávez, Alfonso Herrera, and Aarón Díaz starred as protagonists, while Julio Camejo, Tony Dalton, Miguel Rodarte, and Francesca Guillén starred as antagonists.

== Plot ==
Francisco Romero is a small-town teacher who decides to try his luck in Mexico City. He joins the faculty of Prep school number 10 "Rosario Castellanos" and soon realizes that his work is more demanding than he expected; in addition to having to prove himself as a teacher, he must prove himself as a human being.

He will find that, in order to make a difference with his students, he will also have to assume the roles of counselor, psychologist, doctor, and even detective. The themes this story deals with are: dropping out of school, teen pregnancy, street gangs, men who abuse their stepdaughters, teenagers forced to work to support their families, and alcoholic parents who lead their children down the same path - that is, problems of a very real nature, experienced by high school students the world over.

This is also a love story. Both students and faculty fall victim to Cupid's random arrows, beginning with Francisco and Adriana (the school counselor) who, nonetheless, must put their hormones on hold long enough to become respected role models in the eyes of their students. But their love story is not destined for a happy ending, since Adriana will have to choose between Francisco and her love for her son.

Francisco will have a second chance at love with Ana Maria, the new English teacher who will become his partner when dealing with his students and their problems in and out of school. Ultimately, however, he find love with Angela, the woman in charge of the school cafeteria. She is a working mother whose teenage children Juan David and Sandra attend this same school, and who has managed to keep a fine balance between being a housewife, a working woman, a mother and a lover.

The school itself occupies center stage in this story, and will become the forum where the main conflicts of the plot will be exposed and resolved, and where Francisco Romero, in his role as teacher, will not only show his students how entertaining learning can be, but will make them understand the importance of respect for authority, of friendship, camaraderie, love, and the values that will guide their conduct as they close the cycle of adolescence and move on to become adults.

One of the recurring themes in this telenovela is friendship, which is best exemplified by the story of Gabriela and Marcela, two high school students who struggle to get ahead and maintain their friendship alive in spite of the painful experiences they go through and the many obstacles that threaten to drive them apart. Their friendship will be put to the test when one of them realizes that everyone will give you advice, but no one will stand with you to face the consequences.

Alcohol abuse among teenagers, sexual responsibility, domestic violence and prostitution are also topics addressed in this production. More problems are Magdalena, a strikingly beautiful young woman with a rebellious nature. She faces domestic abuse, while another student Hugo, gets involved with gangs leading to his death. Carlos get swindled into drug dealing and addiction after his friend's death, Kike deals with heartbreak which leads to him becoming an alcoholic, Freddy who deals with being gay, and Daniela whose dreams of becoming a model almost lead her to the end of her life.

While Tatiana comes as the teen who feels out of place as a rich kid whose family has gone poor and must adapt to face the gang 406. She ultimately leads to drugs much later on. The toughest struggle is when Francisco, their professor who has stuck through thick and thin with them must leave with his new wife.

A new professor, Santiago, takes his place. Can the students accept him? Will he be able to fill the void that was left by his predecessor? His troubled past including a young girl who was sexually harassing him in an old school he taught and when he does not agree to have a relationship with her she accuses him of rape.

The girl with the troubled mind is known as Jessica. Her story is one of the classics, a poor rich girl who wishes to act like a villain due to a father who doesn't pay attention to her, and a dead mother who she strives for.

== Cast ==
=== Main ===
- Jorge Poza as Professor Francisco Romero "El Matemático"
- Francisco Gattorno as Santiago Cadavid / Luis Felipe Villasana
- Alejandra Barros as Adriana Pineda Suárez / Ángela Pineda Suárez
- Michelle Vieth as Nadia Castillo Bojorquez "La Profe de Gimnasia"
- Irán Castillo as Magdalena "Magdis" Rivera "La Rebelde"
- Anahí as Jessica Riquelme Drech "La Loca"
- Sherlyn as Gabriela "Gaby" Chávez Rey "La Virgen"
- Dulce María as Marcela "Marce" Mejía "La Otra Virgen"
- Sara Maldonado as Tatiana del Moral "La Riquilla Pobre"
- Christian Chávez as Fernando "Fercho" Lucena "El Chino"
- Francisco Rubio as Carlos Muñoz "El Caballo"
- Aarón Díaz as Enrique "Kike" González "El Guapo"
- Grettell Valdéz as Daniela "Danny" Jiménez Robles "El Cuerpo de la clase"
- Alfonso Herrera as Juan David "Juancho" Rodríguez Pineda "El Ligador"
- Frantz Cossio as Alfredo "Fredy" Ordoñez "El Consentido"
- Pablo Magallanes as Hugo Salcedo "El Chavo Banda"
- Karla Cossío as Sandra Paola Rodríguez Pineda "La Hermana"
- Luis Fernando Peña as Mario Fernández "El Gato"

=== Also starring ===
- Sebastián Rulli as Juan Esteban San Pedro "El Psicólogo"
- Alexa Damián as Ana María Londoño "La Teacher"
- Arap Bethke as Antonio "Chacho" Mendoza Cuervo
- Tony Dalton as Dagoberto "Dago" García "El violador"
- Julio Camejo as Douglas Cifuentes
- Fabián Robles as Giovanni Ferrer Escudero
- Miguel Rodarte as Leonardo "Leo" Nava
- Francesca Guillén as Samsara / Paloma
- Rafael Inclán as Don Ezequiel Cuervo Domínguez "El Director"
- Beatriz Moreno as Blanca Inés "Blanquita" Beteta "La Secretaria"

=== Recurring ===
- Maria Fernanda Garcia as Marlen Rivera
- Felipe Nájera as Dionisio Nino Infante
- Jose Elias Moreno as Manuel del Moral
- Lucero Lander as Dora del Moral
- David Galindo as José Manuel del Moral
- Aracely Mali as Clara Betancourt
- Armando Hernández as Cipriano Goytisolo "El Alebrije"
- Manuel Landeta as Gonzalo Acero
- Imanol Landeta as Alejandro "Alex" Acero Pineda "El Ñiño"
- Luis Fernando Ceballos as Valentino
- Karen Juantorena as Vanessa
- Alan Gutiérrez as Pablo
- Felipe Sánchez as Chuli Nava
- Gabriela Platas as Elisa Camargos
- Liuba de Lasse as Cindy "La DJ"
- Rosangela Balbo as Bertha Ponce
- Eleazar Gómez as Brian Rios
- Wendy González as Blanca Uribe Soto
- José Luis Reséndez as Teacher Gilberto Bernal
- Juan Carlos Colombo as Don Jorge Riquelme
- Alejandra Jurado as Matilde Rodríguez
- Susan Vohn as Silvia
- Giovan D'Angelo as Federico "Fede" Barbera
- Catherine Papile as Andrea
- Conrado Osorio as Edgar
- Carolina Rincón as Susy
- Karla Luengas as Pilar "Pili" Reyna
- Roberto Assad as Dylan "El DJ"
- Bobby Larios as César
- Yessica Salazar as Brenda
- Lourdes Canale as Doña Guillermina "Guille" Muñoz
- Héctor Gómez as Dr. Narváez
- Juan Peláez as Octavio Valenzuela
- Alma Cero as Bianca
- Queta Lavat as Cuquita
- Jose Luis Cordero "Pocholo" as Sr Lucena "Papa de Fercho"
- Dolores Salomon "Bodokito" as Barbara de Lucena
- Adriana Laffan as Teresa Salcedo
- Agustín Arana as Ramiro
- Adriana Barraza as Mabel
- Arturo García Tenorio as Rodolfo
- Alicia Farh as Dolores
- René Casados as Manolo
- Aitor Iturrioz as Max Brouer
- Jorge de Silva as Luigi Ferrer
- Polly as Emiliana Askenazy
- Gabriela Bermúdez as Miriam
- Xóchitl Vigil as Consuelo
- Payín Cejudo as Olga Limonqui
- Paola Flores as Doña Cleotilde
- Aída Diaz as Mercedes
- Esther Diez as Cecilia
- Adrian Mass as Marco
- Pablo Poumian as Rosendo
- Ariadne Pellicer as Esther Peñaloza
- Juan Antonio Edwards as Jerónimo
- Francisco Avendaño as Don Humberto
- Marieth Rodríguez as Valeria Villasana
- Gabriela Cano as Aurora
- Verónica Ibrra as Angelica
- Samantha López as Alejandra Barbosa
- Raquel Morell as Yolanda Bojórquez
- Humberto Dupeyrón as Rubén
- Julio Vega as Dr. Huerta
- Eduardo de la Peña as Gumaro
- Juan Carlos Nava as Pedro Salcedo
- Benjamín Islas as Raul Jimenez
- Andres Montiel as Eleazar Espinoza
- Alberto Salaberri as Erick
- Miguel Priego as Jorge Jiménez
- Miguel Loyo as Mauricio Pereira
- Alejandro Ciangherotti as Lic. Israel Antunez
- Alizair Gómez as Mario Sanpedro
- Azul Guaita as Juanita
- Claudio Rojo as Pablo Benedetti
- Dobrina Cristeva as Natalia
- Jacqueline Voltaire as Teacher Fabianne
- Liza Willert as Catalina Rodriguez
- Mariagna Prats as Silvia
- Marisol del Olmo as Eugenia Moretti
- Martha Julia as Angela
- Rosángela Balbó as Bertha
- Roxana Saucedo as Mariana
- Thelma Dorantes as Carmela
- Yatana as Gina de Franco

== Music ==
=== Clase 406 ===
Clase 406

Soundtrack album by Various artists
- Released: February 18, 2003
- Length: 1:04:34

Clase 406 soundtracks chronology
Clase 406 (2003)	Clase 406 El Siguiente Paso... ! (2003)

Clase 406 is the debut soundtrack of the telenovela, and was released on February 18, 2003.

No.	Title	Artist	Length
1.	"Me Urge"	Clase 406 Cast	0:27
2.	"Clase 406"	Caos	3:08
3.	"Dónde Irán"	La 5ª Estación	3:17
4.	"Yo Soy Así"	Ritmo Llamador	3:41
5.	"¿Y Tú Ya?"	Clase 406 Cast	0:32
6.	"Prohibida"	Raúl	3:43
7.	"It's Ok"	Rogelio Martínez	3:03
8.	"Soun Tha Mi Primer Amor"	Kinky	3:10
9.	"Luna Lunera"	Estopa	3:46
10.	"¿Te Vas A Casar?"	Clase 406 Cast	0:44
11.	"En El 2000"	Natalia Lafourcade	3:34
12.	"La Jarra"	Clase 406 Cast	0:16
13.	"La Cerveza Y El Dolor"	Los Estrambóticos	3:02
14.	"Niña"	Nicho Hinojosa	3:45
15.	"Si Tú No Estás"	Lik	3:54
16.	"Agua Y Sal"	Rosario	3:11
17.	"Mori"	Tranzas	3:33
18.	"El Karma"	Clase 406 Cast	1:27
19.	"Karma Escolar"	Clase 406 Cast	3:15
20.	"Enamorada"	Dulce María	3:07
21.	"Baila"	Sherlyn and Aarón Díaz	3:06
22.	"Una Historia De Amor"	Atómica	3:44
23.	"Y Todo Para Qué"	Intocable	3:09

=== Clase 406 El Siguiente Paso... ! ===
Clase 406 El Siguiente Paso... !

Soundtrack album by Various artists
- Released: August 30, 2003
- Length: 40:22

Clase 406 soundtracks chronology
Clase 406 (2003)	Clase 406 El Siguiente Paso... ! (2003)

Clase 406 El Siguiente Paso... ! is the second and final soundtrack of the telenovela, and was released on August 30, 2003.

No.	Title	Artist	Length
1.	"De Dónde Vienes… A Dónde Vas…?"	Aarón Díaz, Christian Chávez, Alfonso Herrera, Francisco Rubio, Grettell Valdez, Dulce María, Sherlyn	2:35
2.	"Esta Noche"	Christian Chávez	3:21
3.	"Corazón de Ángel"	Aarón Díaz, Christian Chávez, Alfonso Herrera, Francisco Rubio	3:17
4.	"Vete"	Dulce María	3:21
5.	"Por Ti"	Aarón Díaz, Christian Chávez, Alfonso Herrera, Francisco Rubio	3:21
6.	"Dos Enamorados"	Christian Chávez and Dulce María	3:59
7.	"Shala La La"	Aarón Díaz, Christian Chávez, Alfonso Herrera, Francisco Rubio, Grettell Valdez, Dulce María, Sherlyn	3:24
8.	"Grita"	Aarón Díaz, Christian Chávez, Alfonso Herrera, Francisco Rubio, Grettell Valdez, Dulce María, Sherlyn	3:26
9.	"Pélame"	Sherlyn	3:21
10.	"Solo un Poquito"	Francisco Rubio and Sherlyn	3:25
11.	"Jamas"	Aarón Díaz	3:22
12.	"Mirame a los Ojos"	Grettell Valdez, Aarón Díaz, Dulce María, Sherlyn	3:24

== Awards ==
Year	Award	Category	Nominee	Result
2003	21st TVyNovelas Awards	Best Supporting Actor	Rafael Inclán	Won
2003	21st TVyNovelas Awards	Best Female Revelation	Sherlyn	Nominated
2003	21st TVyNovelas Awards	Best Male Revelation	Christian Chávez	Won
2003	Palmas de Oro Awards	Best Young Lead Actress	Sara Maldonado	Nominated
