= Los Horóscopos de Durango =

Mexican-American musical group

- Also known as: Las Reinas del Duranguense
- Origin: Chicago, Illinois, United States
- Genres: Duranguense; banda; norteño-sax; mariachi; grupero
- Years active: 1975-2021; 2025-present
- Labels: Disa Records (2003–2010); Universal Music Latin Entertainment (2010–2015); Fonovisa (2015–2019); Universal Music (2020–present)
- Past members: Sergio Terrazas; Oscar de la Rosa; Juan "El Güero Terrazas; Jose Luis Terrazas; Gerardo García; Karlo Vidal; Jonathan Amabilis; Javier Alba Alba; Samuel Guzmán Magdaleno; Carlos Flores "Carlangas"

Los Horóscopos de Durango are a regional Mexican band. In their first years, they were a grupero band, but they eventually changed to the duranguense style when the genre was becoming mainstream. They eventually switched to Sinaloan banda. Eventually, their live performances became a mixture of the latter two styles. They have also occasionally performed songs in the norteño-sax and mariachi styles.

The band was started by Armando Terrazas in Chicago in 1975. From 2003 to 2021, it was led by his daughters, Vicky and Marisol Terrazas.

By late 2023, signs of reconciliation began to surface as the sisters appeared together at several public events and hinted at performing jointly once again. Their reunion was confirmed in May 2025, when they reunited under the Los Horóscopos de Durango name for a series of anniversary concerts celebrating five decades since the group's formation in 1975. The band has sold out at The Novo by Microsoft, Arena CDMX, Auditorio Telmex, and others across Mexico and the United States.

== Awards and achievements ==
1. Winners of three Billboard Music Awards in 2005:
  - Regional Mexican Album of the Year
  - Most air-played song in the Regional Mexican genre
  - Regional Mexican Song of the Year
2. Winners of two Billboard Awards in 2006:
  - Regional Mexican Album of the Year
  - Regional Mexican Song of the Year.
3. Winners of one Latin Grammy 2007:
  - Band Album of the Year ("Desatados")
4. Winners of one of the Latin Awards delivered by The American Society of Composers, Authors & Publishers (ASCAP) with this same Hernaldo Zúñiga song:
  - Best Regional Song 2007
5. Winners of one award Lo Nuestro 2008:
  - Duranguense Artist of the Year
6. Nominated by the Latin Grammy Awards:
  - Album of the Year 2004
  - Album of the Year 2005
7. Nominated in three categories for Premios Que Buena in 2004.
8. Nominated by Billboard Latin Music Award 2008, for the song "¿Cómo Te Va Mi Amor?" by the Nicaraguan composer Hernaldo Zúñiga:
  - Regional Mexican Airplay Song Of The Year, Female Group or Female Solo Artist

== Discography ==
- Puras de Rompe y Rasga (2003)
- Locos de Amor (2004)
- Recordando el "Terre" (2004)
- A Tamborazo Limpio (2004)
- Con Sabor a Polkas (2005)
- Y Seguimos con Duranguense (2005)
- En Vivo Gira Mexico (2005)
- Antes Muertas Que Sencillas (2006)
- Desatados (2006)
- Ayer, Hoy y Siempre (2008)
- Houston Rodeo Live (2008)
- Pura Pasión (2009)
- Duda (2009)
- La Guera y La Morena (2010)
- Viejitas Pero Buenas... Pa' Pistear (2012)
- Las Chicas Malas (2013)
- Vivir En Pecado (2015)
- Entre El Amor y La Aventura (2018)
