= Flores de Alquiler =

Studio album by La 5ª Estación
- Released: June 22, 2004 (Mexico); August 10, 2004 (U.S)
- Recorded: 2004
- Genre: Latin Pop/Rock
- Labels: Ariola; BMG
- Producer: Armando Ávila

La 5ª Estación chronology
Primera toma (2001)	Flores de Alquiler (2004)	Acústico (2005)

Singles from Flores de Alquiler
- 1. "El Sol No Regresa" Released: May 17, 2004; 2. "Algo Más" Released: September 20, 2004; 3. "Daría" Released: January 31, 2005; 4. "Niña" Released: April 18, 2005

Flores de Alquiler (Leased Flowers) is the second studio album release from the Spanish music trio, La 5ª Estación. It was released throughout 2004 on various dates for North America, Latin America and Spain.

== Track listing ==
#	Song	Composers	Duration
1	"El Sol No Regresa"	Pontes/Villarubia	3:48
2	"Esperaré Despierta"	Natalia Jiménez	3:30
3	"Daría"	Pontes/Villarubia	3:42
4	"Algo Más"	Armando Ávila/Natalia Jiménez	4:29
5	"Flores De Alquiler"	Pontes/Villarubia	3:36
6	"Mi Ciudad"	Natalia Jiménez/Pontes/Villarubia	3:02
7	"Busco Tu Piel"	Natalia Jiménez/Pontes/Villarubia	3:26
8	"A Cada Paso"	Pontes/Villarubia	3:28
9	"Niña"	Natalia Jiménez	4:00
10	"No Hay Perdón"	Natalia Jiménez/Pontes/Villarubia	3:20
11	"Rompe El Mar"	Natalia Jiménez	3:15
		Bonus	Tracks
12	"Si Yo Fuera Mujer" (Se Fossi Una Donna)	Mingardi	3:40
13	"Voy A Pasarmelo Bien"	Summers	3:00

== Singles ==
Year	Title	Chart positions		
Year	Title	U.S.^{HLT}	U.S.^{POP}	MEX
2004	"El sol no regresa"	37	21	10
2005	"Algo más"	3	2	1
2005	"Daría"	13	3	9
2006	"Niña"	-	36	19

=== El Sol No Regresa ===
"El Sol No Regresa" (The Sun Doesn't Return) is the first of four singles from Flores de Alquiler.

=== Algo más ===
"Algo más" (Something More) is the second of four singles from Flores de Alquiler.

=== Daría ===
"Daría" (I Would Give) is the third of four radio singles from the band's second studio album. The track can also be found on the compilation album Now Esto Es Musica! Latino. An acoustic version of "Daría" can be found on the band's Acústico album.

Chart (2005)	Peak position
Billboard Hot Latin Tracks	13
Billboard Latin Pop Airplay	3

=== Niña ===
"Niña" (Girl) is the fourth and final radio single from the band's second album. It reached number 36 on the U.S. Billboard Latin Pop Airplay chart.

== Reviews ==
Professional ratings
Review scores
Source	Rating
Allmusic	4/5 stars

- Allmusic

From the first notes of Flores de Alquiler, it's clear that la 5ª Estación is rock en español a cut above the average. Laced with mariachi horns and fronted by gutsy lead vocalist Natalia Jimenez, the first cut, "El Sol No Regresa," confidently sets the standard of excellence and taste to be met and exceeded by subsequent tracks. The debut performance of this trio, rounded out by rhythm guitarist Angel Pontes and lead guitarist Pablo Dominguez Villarubia, Flores de Alquiler was met with an enthusiastic reception. Reaching the Top Ten on several Billboard lists is only on the surface level of the near instant success of this 2004 release. Aggressive touring in support of this record won them a strong fan base in their native Spain, Mexico, and other corners of the Latin American world. This task would prove easy to any group resourced with the combination of Ponte and Villarubia's clever writing and the lush, flexible vocal work of Jimenez. With a strong first impression on the world audience, la 5ª Estación is sure to continue to dazzle and enchant. Their aggressive yet warm, inventive sound goes down smoothly and richly, and their measured risk-taking is to be applauded.

== Personnel ==
- Spartak Babaev – violin
- Javier Serrano – trumpet
- Natalia Jimenez – harmonica, background chorus
- Miguel Castro – guitar director
- Natalia Jimenez – background chorus
- Armando Avila – background chorus, producer
- Carlos "Patato" Valdes – production assistant
- Emilio Avila – production coordination
- Gilda Oropeza – A&R
- Guillermo Gutierrez – A&R
- MVlado Meller – mastering
- Fernando Velasco – photography

== Charts ==
Chart (2005)	Peak position
U.S. Billboard Top Heatseekers	9
U.S. Billboard Top Latin Albums	7
U.S. Billboard Latin Pop	4
Chart (2006)	Peak position
U.S. Billboard Top Latin Albums	7
U.S. Billboard Latin Pop	4
Chart (2009)	Peak position
Spanish Albums Chart	58

== Certifications ==
Region	Certification	Certified units/sales
Mexico (AMPROFON)	Platinum+Gold	150,000^{^}
United States (RIAA)	2× Platinum (Latin)	200,000^{^}
^{^} Shipments figures based on certification alone.
