= Algo Más (La Quinta Estación song) =

"Algo más"

Single by La 5ª Estación

from the album Flores de alquiler
- Released: 2005
- Recorded: 2004
- Genre: Latin Pop
- Length: 4:29
- Label: RCA International
- Songwriters: Armando Avila; Natalia Jimenez
- Producer: Armando Avila

La 5ª Estación singles chronology
"El sol no regresa" (2004)	"Algo más" (2005)	"Daría" (2005)

"Algo más" (Something More) is La 5ª Estación's second single release from their second studio album, Flores de alquiler.

== Song information ==
Algo más was written by Natalia Jimenez the lead singer. The song talks about a feeling that the author says is not love, but it is "something more" that fulfills her and it is stronger than "distance, pain and nostalgia".

The song was released in early 2005 in Latin America, United States and Spain. Algo más was also released to coincide as the main theme song for the telenovela, Innocente de ti. The song proved to be a success when it charted at number three on the U.S. Billboard Hot Latin Tracks and number two on the Latin Pop Airplay charts.

== Music video ==
The video for Algo más was recorded at a bar in the Historic District of Mexico City.

The video was directed by Alejandro Hernandez, who also directed the video for El sol no regresa and its photography is in black and white. The scene and wardrobe are set in the 1950s and the band is seen performing at a nightclub with a couple enjoying the song and afterwards inspired by its lyrics leave their seats to caress each other.

== Charts ==
Chart (2005)	Peak position
US Bubbling Under Hot 100 Singles (Billboard)	19
US Hot Latin Songs (Billboard)	3
US Latin Pop Airplay (Billboard)	2
