= List of number-one Billboard Latin Pop Airplay songs of 2007 =

The Billboard Latin Pop Songs is a chart that ranks the best-performing Spanish-language Pop music singles of the United States. Published by Billboard magazine, the data are compiled by Nielsen SoundScan based collectively on each single's weekly airplay.

== Chart history ==
Issue date	Song	Artist(s)	Ref.
January 6	"Tu Recuerdo"	Ricky Martin featuring La Mari	
January 13	"Tu Recuerdo"	Ricky Martin featuring La Mari	
January 20	"Tu Recuerdo"	Ricky Martin featuring La Mari	
January 27	"Tu Recuerdo"	Ricky Martin featuring La Mari	
February 3	"Tu Recuerdo"	Ricky Martin featuring La Mari	
February 10	"Tu Recuerdo"	Ricky Martin featuring La Mari	
February 17	"Tu Recuerdo"	Ricky Martin featuring La Mari	
February 24	"Tu Amor"	Luis Fonsi	
March 3	"Tu Recuerdo"	Ricky Martin featuring La Mari	
March 10	"Te Lo Agradezco, Pero No"	Alejandro Sanz featuring Shakira	
March 17	"Manda Una Señal"	Maná	
March 24	"Manda Una Señal"	Maná	
March 31	"Te Lo Agradezco, Pero No"	Alejandro Sanz featuring Shakira	
April 7	"Manda Una Señal"	Maná	
April 14	"Manda Una Señal"	Maná	
April 21	"Si Nos Quedara Poco Tiempo"	Chayanne	
April 28	"Si Nos Quedara Poco Tiempo"	Chayanne	
May 5	"Si Nos Quedara Poco Tiempo"	Chayanne	
May 12	"Si Nos Quedara Poco Tiempo"	Chayanne	
May 19	"Si Nos Quedara Poco Tiempo"	Chayanne	
May 26	"Si Nos Quedara Poco Tiempo"	Chayanne	
June 2	"Si Nos Quedara Poco Tiempo"	Chayanne	
June 9	"Si Nos Quedara Poco Tiempo"	Chayanne	
June 16	"Si Nos Quedara Poco Tiempo"	Chayanne	
June 23	"Si Nos Quedara Poco Tiempo"	Chayanne	
June 30	"Dimelo"	Enrique Iglesias	
July 7	"Si Nos Quedara Poco Tiempo"	Chayanne	
July 14	"Dimelo"	Enrique Iglesias	
July 21	"Dimelo"	Enrique Iglesias	
July 28	"Dimelo"	Enrique Iglesias	
August 4	"Dimelo"	Enrique Iglesias	
August 11	"Dimelo"	Enrique Iglesias	
August 18	"Dimelo"	Enrique Iglesias	
August 25	"Dimelo"	Enrique Iglesias	
September 1	"Dimelo"	Enrique Iglesias	
September 8	"Dimelo"	Enrique Iglesias	
September 15	"Dimelo"	Enrique Iglesias	
September 22	"Dimelo"	Enrique Iglesias	
September 29	"Me Enamora"	Juanes	
October 6	"Me Enamora"	Juanes	
October 13	"Me Enamora"	Juanes	
October 20	"Me Enamora"	Juanes	
October 27	"Me Enamora"	Juanes	
November 3	"Me Enamora"	Juanes	
November 10	"Me Enamora"	Juanes	
November 17	"Me Enamora"	Juanes	
November 24	"Me Enamora"	Juanes	
December 1	"Me Enamora"	Juanes	
December 8	"Me Enamora"	Juanes	
December 15	"Me Enamora"	Juanes	
December 22	"Me Enamora"	Juanes	
December 29	"Me Enamora"	Juanes	

== See also ==
- List of number-one Billboard Hot Latin Songs of 2007
