= Julio Martínez Prádanos National Stadium =

Stadium in Santiago, Chile

- Estadio Nacional Julio Martínez Prádanos
- El Coloso (The Colossus)
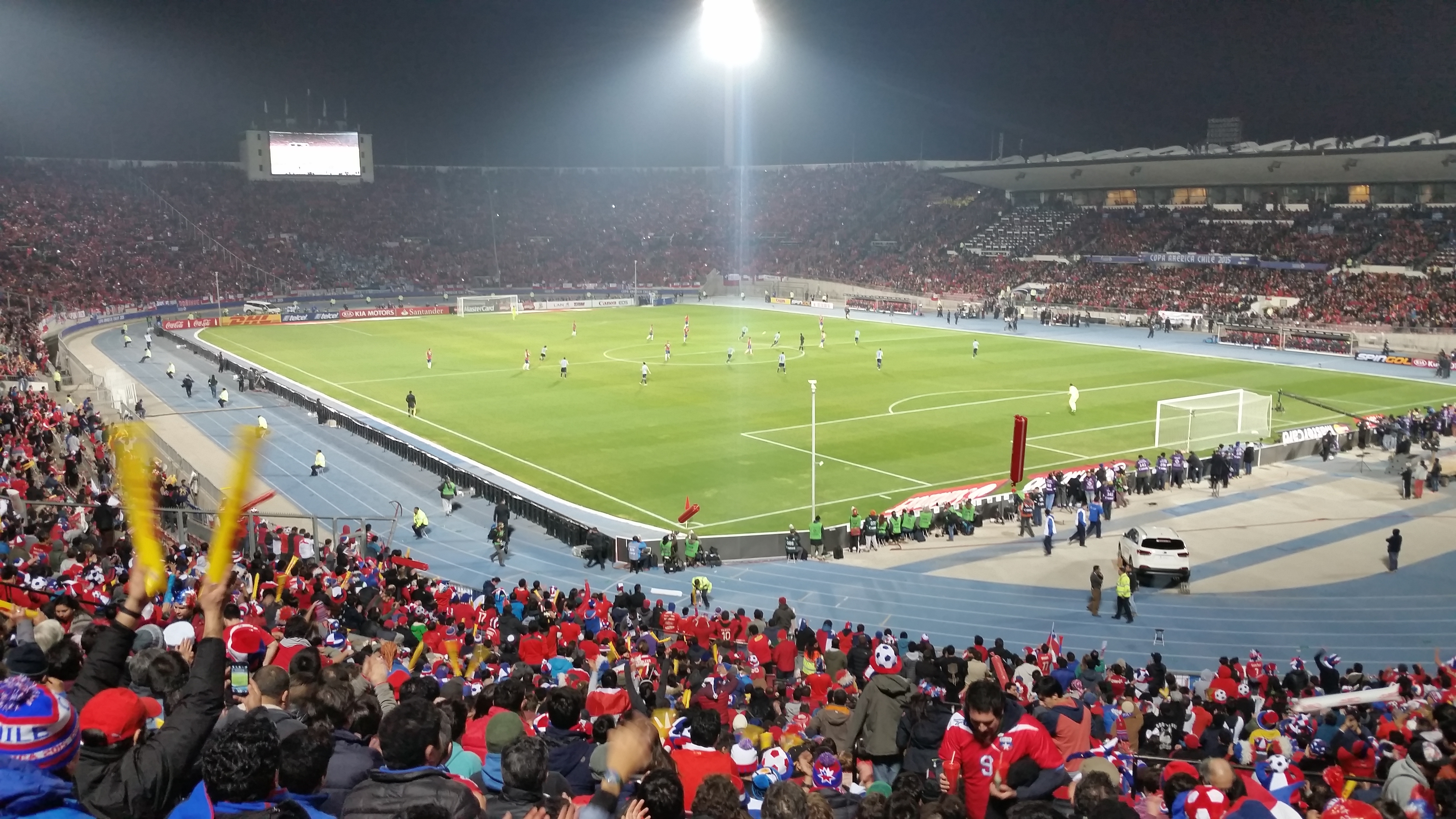
- Interior of the stadium
- Interactive map of Julio Martínez Prádanos National Stadium
- Former names: Estadio Nacional (1938–2008)
- Location: Av. Grecia 2001, National Stadium Sports Park, Ñuñoa, Chile
- Coordinates: 33°27′52″S 70°36′38″W
- Owner: Municipality of Ñuñoa
- Operator: Chiledeportes
- Capacity: 48,745
- Surface: GrassMaster
- Record attendance: 85,268 (Universidad de Chile–Universidad Católica, 29 December 1962)
- Field size: 105 m x 68 m
- Public transit: at Estadio Nacional

Construction
- Groundbreaking: 1937
- Opened: 3 December 1938
- Renovated: 2009–10
- Expanded: 1962
- Reopened: 12 September 2010
- Cost: $18,000,000
- Architects: Ricardo Muller; Aníbal Fuentealba; Roberto Cormatches
- Main contractor: Salinas y Fabres

Tenants
- Chile national football team Universidad de Chile; Palestino; Santiago Morning; Deportes Recoleta; Deportes Melipilla; Real Juventud San Joaquín; Municipal Santiago; Gremio de Santiago; Selknam (rugby club)

The Julio Martínez Prádanos National Stadium (Spanish: Estadio Nacional Julio Martínez Prádanos, Latin American Spanish pronunciation: [esˈtaðjo nasjoˈnal ˈxuljo maɾˈtines ˈpɾaðanos]) is an association football stadium in Santiago, Chile. Located in the Ñuñoa commune, it is part of the National Stadium Sports Park, a 62 hectare sporting complex which also features tennis courts, an aquatics center, a modern gymnasium, a velodrome, a BMX circuit, and an assistant ground/warmup athletics track.

Construction began in February 1937 and the stadium was inaugurated on 3 December 1938. The architecture was based on the Olympiastadion in Berlin, Germany. The stadium was one of the venues for the FIFA World Cup in 1962, and hosted the final where Brazil defeated Czechoslovakia 3–1. In 1948, the stadium hosted the matches of the South American Championship of Champions, the competition that inspired the creation of the UEFA Champions League and of the Copa Libertadores. The stadium was notoriously used as a mass imprisonment, torture, and extrajudicial execution facility by the Pinochet dictatorship following the 1973 military coup.

In 2009, a complete modernization plan was unveiled for the stadium and surrounding facilities. President Michelle Bachelet said it would become the most modern stadium in South America. A roof above the stands was initially proposed by Bachelet in order to make the stadium an indoor venue, however, this was never completed. The stadium was the opening and closing ceremonies, athletics, and football venue for the 2014 South American Games, and hosted the opening ceremonies and the athletics during the 2023 Pan American Games. The stadium also hosted the opening ceremonies of the 2023 Parapan American Games.

== History ==
The stadium is named after journalist Julio Martínez (pictured in 1952), who had an over 60 year career before his passing in 2008.

The stadium was built on former farmland, donated in 1918 by landowner and philanthropist Jose Domingo Cañas. The first sporting event in the new stadium took place on 3 December 1938, with a friendly game between the Chilean club Colo-Colo and Brazilian club São Cristóvão, with the former winning 6–3.

It has hosted all matches of the 1941, 1945 and 1955 South American Football Championships, and several matches of the 1991 and 2015 Copa América.

The stadium hosted the final stages of the 1959 World Basketball Championship. It was held outdoors because the intended venue, the Metropolitan Indoor Stadium, was not ready in time.

In the early 1960s, under the government of Jorge Alessandri, the stadium was expanded to host the 1962 FIFA World Cup. The main modification was replacing the velodrome that surrounded the stadium with galleries, thereby increasing its capacity to around 95,000.

The stadium hosted group stage games between Italy, West Germany, Switzerland and Chile, including a notoriously ill-tempered and violent clash between Italy and Chile which became known as the Battle of Santiago. A quarter-final, a semi-final, the third place play-off, and the final were also held at the ground, where Brazil was crowned world champions for the second time. In the third-place play-off, Chile defeated Yugoslavia 1–0, marking the team's greatest success in international football.

Today, the ground serves as the home field for both the national team and the first-division club Universidad de Chile. It also hosts non-sporting events, such as political celebrations, charity events and concerts.

The stadium had been used since 1995 as the final leg of the Teletón with Don Francisco, a 28-hour telecast. The stadium holds up to 100,000 people for this annual event with the Jumbotron showing the required amount required to reach the goal and the current donation level. Exceptions were in 2014 and 2020; the first one was canceled due to bad weather conditions and the second due to the protection after the social outbreak.

On 5 July 2008, the stadium was officially renamed Estadio Nacional Julio Martínez Prádanos, in honor of Julio Martínez, a Chilean sports commentator specializing in football who had a long career in the written press, radio and television, who had died in January of the same year.

=== Use as a detention center ===
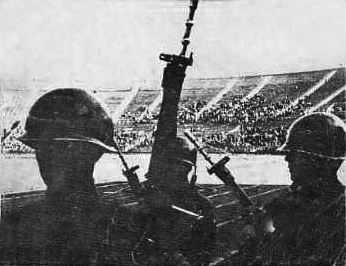
Military units watching over prisoners detained at the stadium, 1973.

After the coup d'état of 11 September 1973, that ousted President Salvador Allende, the stadium began to be used as a detention facility. An article in the Harvard Review of Latin America reported that "there were over 80 detention centers in Santiago alone" and gave details of the National Stadium and others.

Between 12,000 and 20,000 people spent time in the compound during the junta regime. Twelve thousand detainees were interned between 11 September and 7 November. The field and gallery were used to hold men, while women were held in the swimming pool changing rooms and associated buildings. Locker rooms and corridors were all used as prison facilities while interrogations were carried out in the velodrome. The Red Cross estimated that 7,000 prisoners occupied the stadium at one point, of whom about 300 were foreigners. According to the testimonies of survivors collected by the humanitarian group, detainees were tortured and threatened with death by shooting. Some were actually shot or taken to unknown locations for execution.

FIFA President Sir Stanley Rous insisted the USSR team play a World Cup qualifier at the time. They however refused to do so and Chile qualified automatically for the 1974 World Cup, where they failed to advance from a group containing both West and East Germany and Australia.

The use of the stadium during the coup d'état is depicted in the 2002 documentary film Estadio Nacional, directed and produced by Carmen Luz Parot, and in the 2007 Swedish film The Black Pimpernel, which is based on the story of Swedish ambassador in Chile Harald Edelstam and his heroic actions to protect the lives of over 1,200 people during and after the military coup. The Black Pimpernel was shot on location in Santiago. The 1982 film Missing by Greek filmmaker Costa-Gavras depicts the 11 September 1973, coup d'état and execution of American journalists Charles Horman and Frank Teruggi at the Estadio Nacional.

In 2011, Chile set aside a section of the stadium, a section of old wooden bleachers called Escotilla n.º 8, to honor the prisoners who were detained there. It is surrounded by a barbed wire fence.

=== 2009–2010 renovation ===
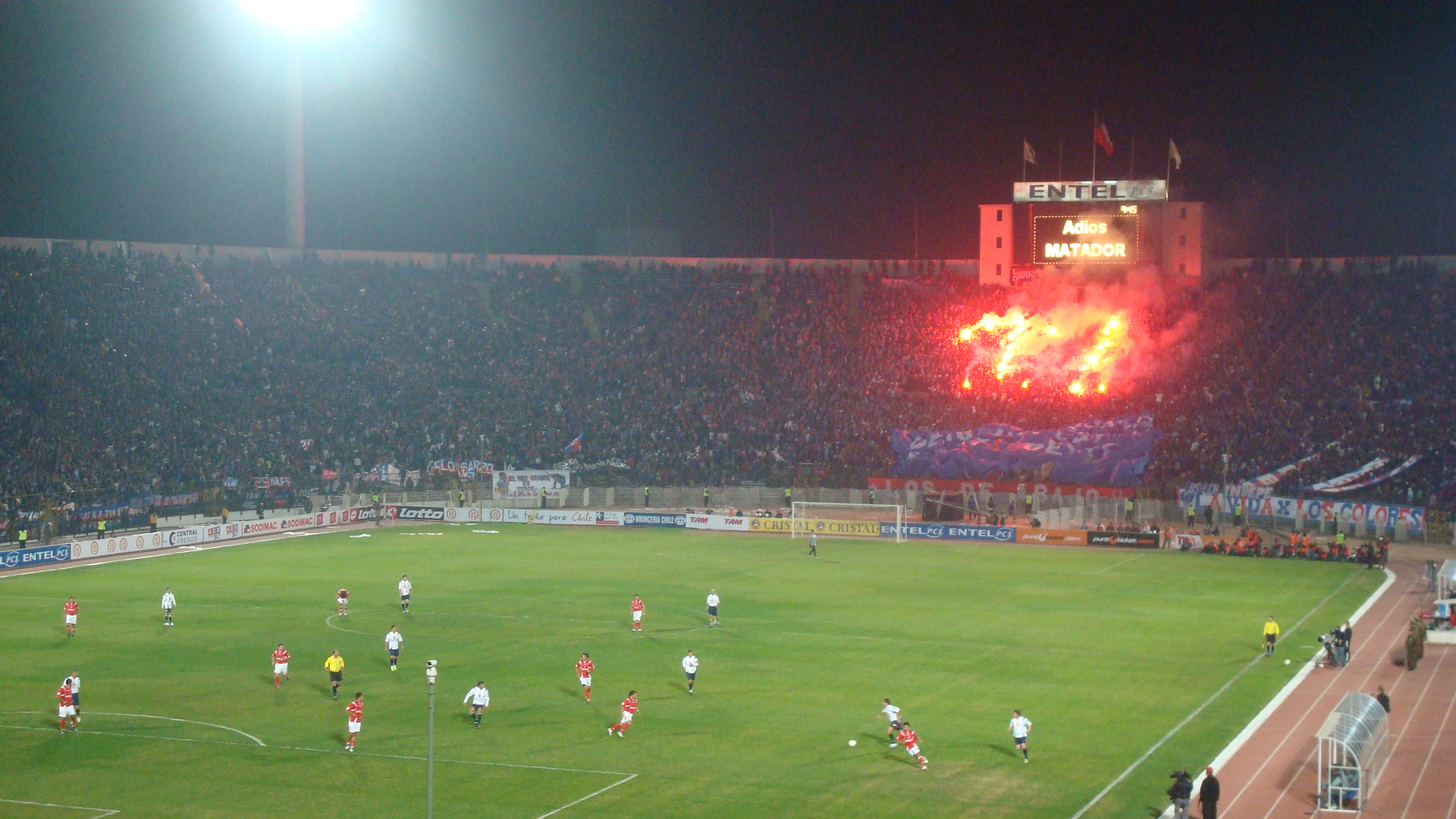
Marcelo Salas farewell match, June 2, 2009

On 15 June 2009, President Michelle Bachelet announced several infrastructure improvements in order to modernize the stadium and its immediate facilities. Out of the total 24 billion pesos (US$42.3 million) contemplated in the plan, 20 billion pesos (US$35.3 million) are destined to bring the stadium up to modern standards. The changes include, a roof covering all the seats, which will also provide illumination; installation of seats around the entire stadium, lowering the current capacity to 47,000; a new state-of-the-art scoreboard; a 2.5 m deep 2 m wide pit will separate the track and the spectators to replace the fence; and several other changes. Because the stadium is a national monument the façade will remain the same, with the roof structure placed on top, without modifying the exterior. The stadium was closed on August 15, 2009. The stadium was scheduled to be reinaugurated in March 2010 to stage a double friendly match between Chile and North Korea and Panama, but the works were not finished on time. The construction of the roof has since been postponed by the government of President Sebastián Piñera due to financial constraints brought about by the 27 February 2010 earthquake. Although the stadium suffered minor damage from the earthquake, it partially opened to host the match between C.F. Universidad de Chile and C.D. Guadalajara for Copa Libertadores 2010. It was officially re-inaugurated on 12 September 2010, during Chile's bicentennial festivities.

=== 2014 South American Games renovation ===
On 12 September 2010, during the Chilean bicentennial festivities, President Sebastián Piñera announced that the capacity of the stadium will be increased so as to reach 70,000 seats for the 2014 South American Games that took place in Santiago. The works started in 2012.

On 3 June 2011, further renovation plans were announced by the government. The complete area surrounding the stadium will be turned into a park to be called "Citizenry Park" (Parque de la Ciudadanía). Over 70% of the new 64-hectare park will consist of green areas, and the rest will include new infrastructure such as a lagoon or restaurants. The park was expected to be ready for the 2014 games. New sporting venues were built for the 2014 games, such as two modern gymnasiums, a new heated pool for synchronized swimming, a renovated velodrome and an expanded CAR, which will also serve as residence of the future Ministry of Sports. The only venues that will remain are the stadium, the main tennis court, the velodrome, the CAR, the athletics track, the skating track, the hockey field and the caracolas.

=== 2023 renovation and Sports Park ===
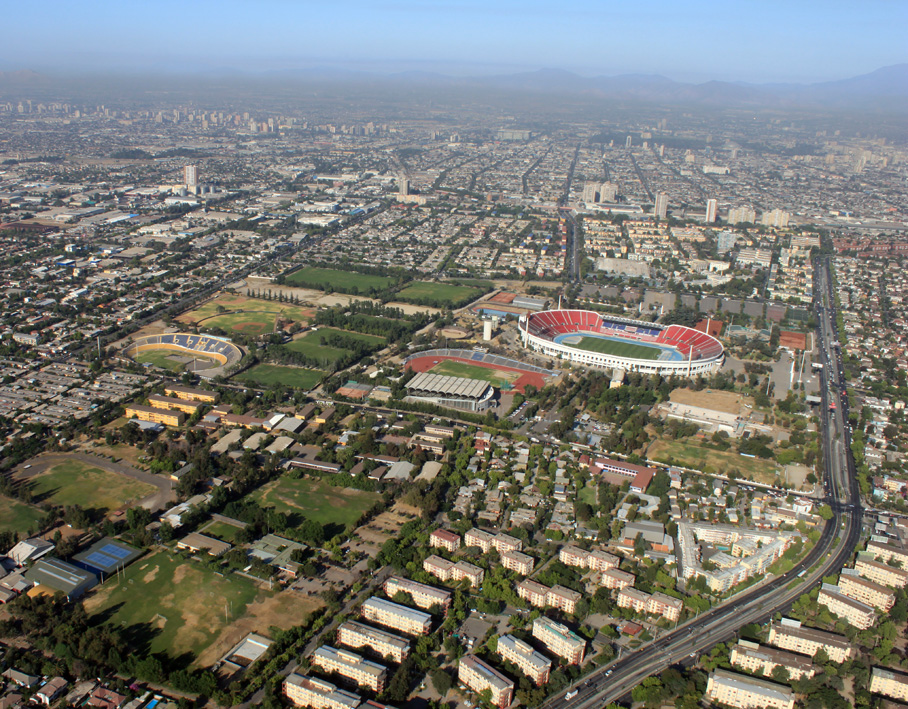
Aerial view of the Estadio Nacional Sports Park

The Estadio Nacional Sports Park was conceived under the improvements of the venue in preparations for the 2023 Pan American Games, and included the building of infrastructure for high impact sports and recreative activities, opened in 2023.

== Attendances ==
The highest attendance for a match at Estadio Nacional to date is 85,268, for a Primera Division match played on 29 December 1962; Universidad de Chile defeated Universidad Catolica 4–1. In the 2016–17 season, Universidad de Chile drew an average home league attendance of 30,041 for the Apertura and 33,466 for the Clausura.

== 1962 FIFA World Cup ==
Estadio Nacional hosted ten games of the 1962 FIFA World Cup, including the final matches.

Date	Time (UTC−04)	Team No. 1	Res.	Team No. 2	Round	Attendance
30 May 1962	15:00	Chile	3–1	Switzerland	Group 2	65,006
31 May 1962	15:00	West Germany	0–0	Italy	Group 2	65,440
2 June 1962	15:00	Chile	2–0	Italy	Group 2	66,057
3 June 1962	15:00	West Germany	2–1	Switzerland	Group 2	64,922
6 June 1962	15:00	West Germany	2–0	Chile	Group 2	67,224
7 June 1962	15:00	Italy	3–0	Switzerland	Group 2	59,828
10 June 1962	14:30	Yugoslavia	1–0	West Germany	Quarter-finals	63,324
13 June 1962	14:30	Brazil	4–2	Chile	Semi-finals	76,594
16 June 1962	14:30	Chile	1–0	Yugoslavia	Third place play-off	66,697
17 June 1962	14:30	Brazil	3–1	Czechoslovakia	Final	68,679

== Concerts ==
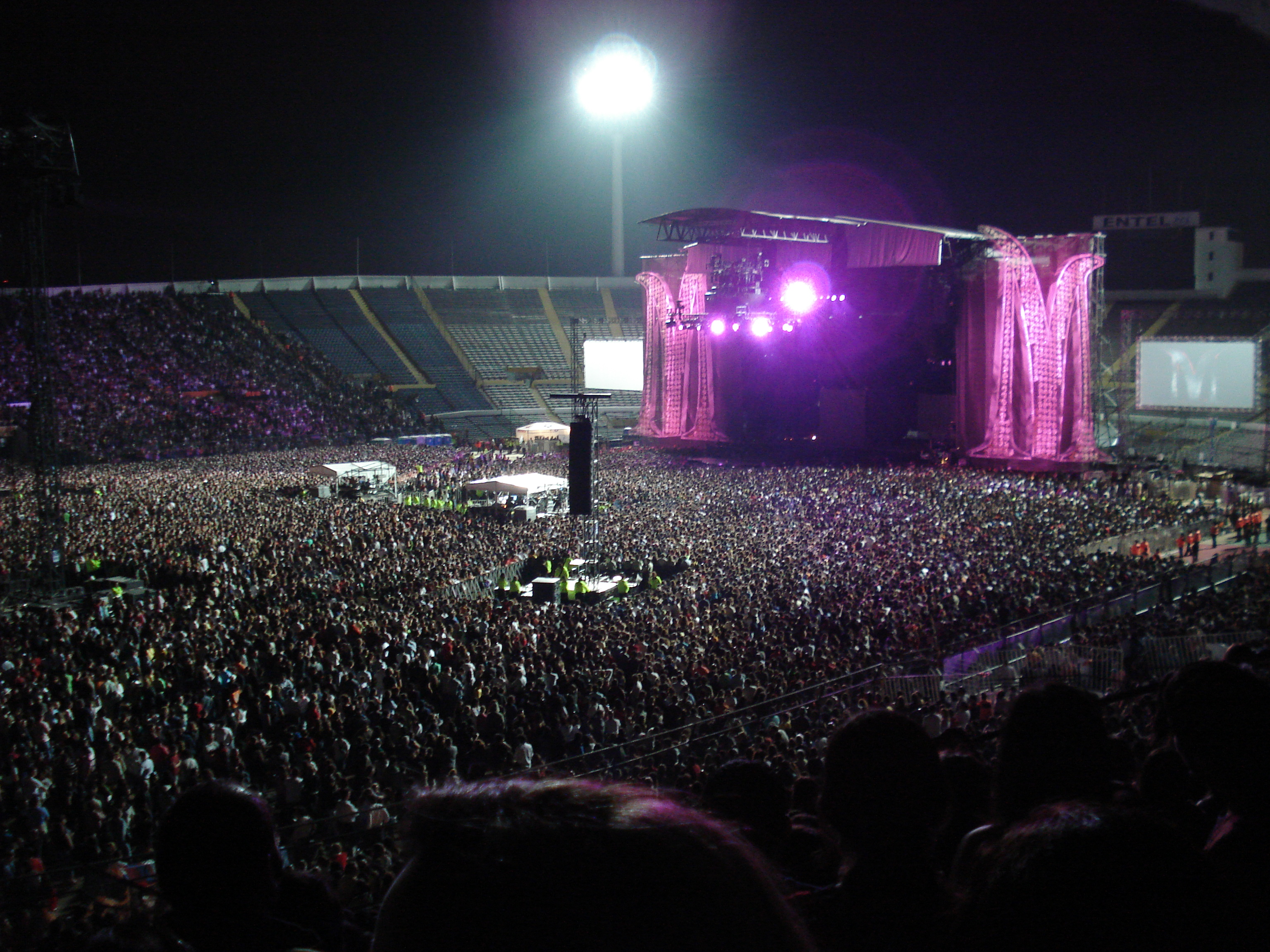
In 2008, Madonna was the first international artist to perform two concerts in two consecutive days in the stadium since 1990. Pictured, the second show of her Sticky & Sweet Tour in the venue.

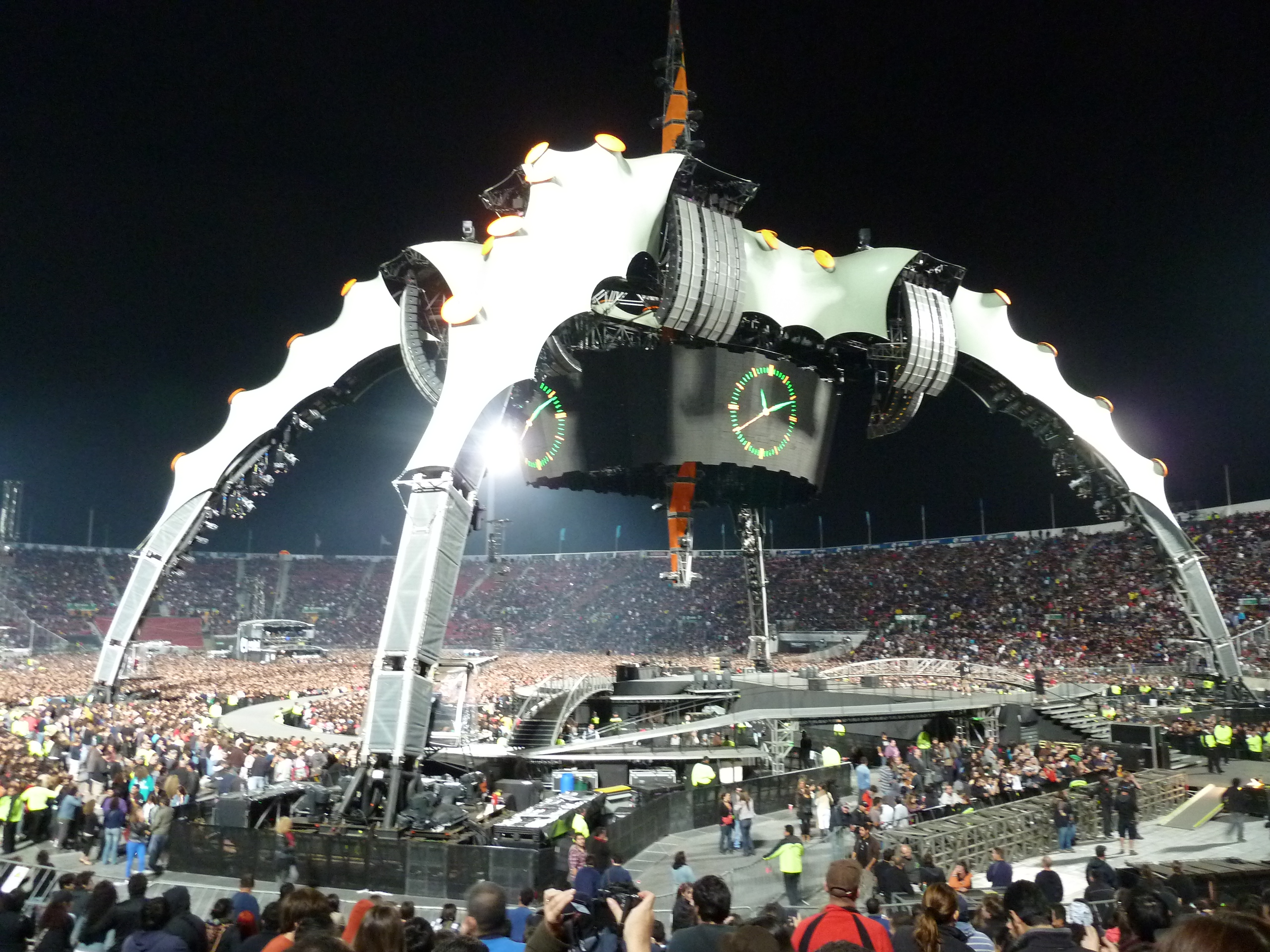
The U2 360° Tour became the biggest stage structure built inside the stadium to date.

The stadium hosts many international and national concerts during the year. In 1977, Spanish singer Julio Iglesias was the first musical act and first solo artist to perform in the stadium. Years later, in 1989, Rod Stewart performed what is considered the first proper rock concert by an international artist in the venue, drawing 70,000 fans to his Out of Order Tour, with the show being broadcast on TV throughout the country. After that show, the city started being included in many tours from international artists, using several facilities from the Stadium park.

In 2001, Chilean band Los Prisioneros became the first act to perform two consecutive days in the stadium, while Madonna is considered the first international artist to achieve the same in 2008. In 2022, Puerto Rican star Daddy Yankee became the first act to sell out three concerts in the venue on a single day, while British band Coldplay became the first act to schedule three and four consecutive concerts as part of the same tour. In 2023, Chilean band Los Bunkers became the second Chilean act to book two consecutive concerts in the venue, after Los Prisioneros achieved the same in 2001. In 2024, Colombian singer Karol G became the first solo female act to sell out three consecutive concerts in the venue. In 2025, Chilean singer Myriam Hernández became the first Chilean solo female act to book a concert in the venue.

Recordings of concerts at the stadium have been commercially released. The show of Cuban folk singer Silvio Rodríguez in March 1990 was released on a 2CD set titled Silvio Rodríguez en Chile, while both concerts of Los Prisioneros in late 2001 were released on cassette and CD as Estadio Nacional, and on VHS and DVD as Lo Estamos Pasando Muy Bien. English heavy metal band Iron Maiden recorded their show in the venue during The Final Frontier World Tour in April 2011. The show was released on CD, LP, DVD and Blu-ray as En Vivo! in March 2012.

The following is a list of concerts, showing date, artist or band, tour, opening acts and attendance, separated by decade.

1970s
Date	Headlining Artist	Concert or Tour	Opening acts	Attendance
11 February 1977	Julio Iglesias	1977 Tour	—	60,000-100,000

1980s
Date	Headlining Artist	Concert or Tour	Opening acts	Attendance
22 December 1987 (Note: This show took place on the adjacent Tennis Court.)	Pat Metheny Group	Still Life (Talking)	—	6,000
7 March 1989	Rod Stewart	Out of Order Tour	—	80,000
10 November 1989	Cyndi Lauper	A Night to Remember Tour	—	45,394

1990s
Date	Headlining Artist	Concert or Tour	Opening acts	Attendance
6 February 1990	Bon Jovi	New Jersey Syndicate Tour	—	33,186
31 March 1990	Silvio Rodríguez	Retorno a la Democracia	—	80,000
28 April 1990	Joan Manuel Serrat	Por Fin Chile	—	55,000
29 April 1990	Joan Manuel Serrat	Por Fin Chile	—	55,000
27 September 1990 (Note: The David Bowie, Bryan Adams and Eric Clapton concerts on 27, 28 and 29 September 1990 were promoted as part of the Rock In Chile Festival, but are considered part of their own tours.)	David Bowie	Sound+Vision Tour	—	15,000
28 September 1990	Bryan Adams	Playing For The Hell of It Tour	—	70,000
29 September 1990	Eric Clapton	Journeyman World Tour	Mick Taylor	50,000
12 October 1990	New Kids on the Block; Rubén Blades; Jackson Browne; Inti-Illimani; Congreso; Los Ronaldos	Desde Chile... un abrazo a la esperanza	—	80,000
13 October 1990	Sting; Peter Gabriel; Sinéad O'Connor; Rubén Blades; Jackson Browne; Wynton Marsalis; Inti-Illimani; Luz Casal	Desde Chile... un abrazo a la esperanza	—	80,000
8 December 1990	Xuxa	Xuxa 90	—	—N/a
13 September 1992 (Note: This show took place on the adjacent National Velodrome.)	Ramones	Mondo Bizarro Tour	Fiskales Ad-Hok	—N/a
2 December 1992	Guns N' Roses	Use Your Illusion Tour	Diva	85,535
22 January 1993	Soda Stereo	Gira Dynamo	—	—N/a
4 May 1993	Metallica	Nowhere Else to Roam	SpitFire	—N/a
9 May 1993	Duran Duran	The Dilate Your Mind Tour	—	—N/a
29 September 1993	Peter Gabriel	Secret World Tour	—	—N/a
23 October 1993	Michael Jackson	Dangerous World Tour	TLC	85,000
9 November 1993	Bon Jovi	I'll Sleep When I'm Dead Tour	—	—N/a
1 December 1993	Luis Miguel	Aries Tour	—	—N/a
16 December 1993	Paul McCartney	The New World Tour	Eduardo Gatti	45,000
10 April 1994	Depeche Mode	Exotic Tour	Primal Scream	25,000
13 November 1994 (Note: This show took place on the adjacent Racing Track.)	Aerosmith	Get a Grip Tour	Gilby Clarke	—N/a
19 February 1995	The Rolling Stones	Voodoo Lounge Tour	Ratones Paranoicos; Los Barracos	53,600
7 November 1995	Elton John	Made in England Tour	—	40,000
22 October 1996	AC/DC	Ballbreaker Tour	Malón	—N/a
30 November 1996	Luis Miguel	Nada Es Igual Tour	—	45,200
11 March 1997	Kiss	Alive/Worldwide Tour	Pantera	—N/a
13 September 1997	Soda Stereo	El Último Concierto	Sien; Solar	—N/a
5 November 1997 (Note: The David Bowie and Erasure concerts on 5 and 6 November 1997 were promoted as part of the Santiago Music Rock Festival, but are considered part of their own tours.)	David Bowie	Earthling Tour	Bush; Molotov	—N/a
6 November 1997	Erasure	The Cowboy Tour	No Doubt	—N/a
11 February 1998	U2	PopMart Tour	Santa Locura	67,633
12 May 1999	Metallica	Garage Remains the Same Tour	Sepultura	—N/a
20 November 1999	Luis Miguel	Amarte Es Un Placer Tour	—	60,000

2000s
Date	Headlining Artist	Concert or Tour	Opening acts	Attendance
21 January 2000	Chayanne	Atado a tu Amor Tour	—	—N/a
29 March 2000	Shakira	Tour Anfibio	—	—N/a
15 January 2001	Iron Maiden	Brave New World Tour	Halford	—N/a
30 March 2001	Alejandro Sanz	El Alma Al Aire Tour	—	—N/a
4 October 2001	Eric Clapton	Reptile World Tour	Miguel Vilanova	50,000
30 November 2001	Los Prisioneros	Estadio Nacional	—	145,000
1 December 2001	Los Prisioneros	Estadio Nacional	—	145,000
2 March 2002	Roger Waters	In the Flesh	—	—N/a
9 October 2002	Red Hot Chili Peppers	By the Way Tour	Los Tetas	15,000
16 November 2002	Luis Miguel	Mis Romances Tour	—	45,155
8 March 2003	Shakira	El Tour de la Mangosta	Jimmy Fernández	53,000
8 November 2003	La Ley	Gira Libertad	—	28,000
14 November 2003	Ricardo Arjona	Gira Santo Pecado	—	—N/a
31 March 2004	Alejandro Sanz	No Es Lo Mismo Tour	—	25,000
9 March 2005 (Note: The Lenny Kravitz concert on 9 March 2005 was originally announced to take place on 10 March, but it was rescheduled due to logistical issues.)	Lenny Kravitz	Celebration Tour	—	50,000
15 November 2005	Luis Miguel	México En La Piel Tour	—	45,680
26 February 2006	U2	Vertigo Tour	Franz Ferdinand	77,345
12 March 2006	Oasis	Don't Believe the Truth Tour	Los Bunkers	7,000
10 October 2006	Robbie Williams	Close Encounters Tour	—	50,000
3 November 2006	RBD	Tour Generación RBD	—	40,191
22 November 2006	Shakira	Tour Fijación Oral	—	51,000
14 March 2007	Roger Waters	The Dark Side of the Moon Live	—	45,000
17 March 2007	Alejandro Sanz	El Tren De Los Momentos Tour	—	40,000
1 April 2007	Don Omar; Wisin & Yandel	La Trilogía del Reggaetón	—	55,000
18 May 2007	High School Musical Cast	High School Musical: The Concert	Jordan Pruitt	16,570
24 October 2007	Soda Stereo	Me Verás Volver	—	140,000
31 October 2007	Soda Stereo	Me Verás Volver	—	140,000
22 November 2007	Daddy Yankee	The Big Boss Tour	—	—N/a
5 December 2007	The Police	The Police Reunion Tour	Beck	48,725
13 November 2008	Kylie Minogue	KylieX2008	—	10,000
10 December 2008	Madonna	Sticky & Sweet Tour	Paul Oakenfold	146,242
11 December 2008	Madonna	Sticky & Sweet Tour	Paul Oakenfold	146,242
26 March 2009	Radiohead	In Rainbows Tour	Kraftwerk	52,000
27 March 2009	Radiohead	In Rainbows Tour	Kraftwerk	52,000

2010s
Date	Headlining Artist	Concert or Tour	Opening acts	Attendance
29 August 2010	Daddy Yankee	Mundial Tour	—	10,000
1 October 2010	Bon Jovi	The Circle Tour	Lucybell	46,983
17 October 2010	Rush	Time Machine Tour	—	36,840
11 March 2011 (Note: The Shakira concert on 11 March 2011 was promoted as part of the Pop Fest, but is considered part of its own tour.)	Shakira	Sale El Sol Tour	Ziggy Marley; Vicentico; Train; Francisca Valenzuela	40,000
25 March 2011	U2	U2 360° Tour	Muse	82,596
10 April 2011	Iron Maiden	The Final Frontier World Tour	Exodus	55,780
4 May 2011	Miley Cyrus	Corazón Gitano Tour	Augusto Schuster	42,805
11 May 2011	Paul McCartney	Up and Coming Tour	—	52,000
15 October 2011	Justin Bieber	My World Tour	Cobra Starship	41,457
22 November 2011	Britney Spears	Femme Fatale Tour	Howie Dorough; C-Funk	45,000
2 March 2011	Roger Waters	The Wall Live	—	93,926
3 March 2011	Roger Waters	The Wall Live	—	93,926
20 November 2012	Lady Gaga	Born This Way Ball	The Darkness; Lady Starlight	42,416
19 December 2012	Madonna	The MDNA Tour	Laidback Luke	47,625
14 April 2013	The Cure	LatAm2013 Tour	Amöniäco; Prehistöricos	50,000
2 October 2013	Iron Maiden	Maiden England World Tour	Slayer; Ghost	57,217
7 November 2013	Blur	Blur21 Tour	Beck	20,000
12 November 2013	Justin Bieber	Believe Tour	Carly Rae Jepsen; Owl City	47,969
30 April 2014	One Direction	Where We Are Tour	Abraham Mateo	87,324
1 May 2014	One Direction	Where We Are Tour	Abraham Mateo	87,324
15 January 2015 (Note: The Foo Fighters concert on 15 January 2015 was originally scheduled to take place in the main field, but it was moved to the Athletic track for logistic reasons.)	Foo Fighters	Sonic Highways World Tour	Kaiser Chiefs	20,939
27 February 2015	Romeo Santos	Vol. 2 Tour	—	45,000
23 April 2015	Ed Sheeran	x Tour	Antonio Lulic	14,797
29 September 2015	Rihanna	Latin America Tour	Big Sean	50,200
30 September 2015	Queen + Adam Lambert	2015 Tour	—	30,000
6 October 2015	Katy Perry	The Prismatic World Tour	Tinashe	23,438
4 November 2015	Pearl Jam	2015 Latin America Tour	—	60,000
20 December 2015	David Gilmour	Rattle That Lock Tour	—	46,509
3 February 2016	The Rolling Stones	América Latina Olé Tour 2016	Los Tres	62,412
11 March 2016	Iron Maiden	The Book of Souls World Tour	Anthrax; The Raven Age	54,911
3 April 2016	Coldplay	A Head Full of Dreams Tour	Lianne La Havas; María Colores	60,787
29 October 2016	Guns N' Roses	Not in This Lifetime... Tour	Wild Parade	62,375
19 November 2016	Black Sabbath	The End Tour	Rival Sons	60,121
23 March 2017	Justin Bieber	Purpose World Tour	—	43,000
14 October 2017	U2	The Joshua Tree Tour 2017	Noel Gallagher's High Flying Birds	53,422
28 November 2017	Bruno Mars	24K Magic World Tour	DNCE	67,648
14 January 2018	Plácido Domingo	Chile en mi Corazón	Mon Laferte	43,000
8 March 2018	Katy Perry	Witness: The Tour	Schuster	15,336
15 March 2018	Phil Collins	Not Dead Yet Tour	The Pretenders	52,460
21 March 2018	Depeche Mode	Global Spirit Tour	Matías Aguayo & The Desdemonas	60,668
11 April 2018	Radiohead	SUE Festival	Flying Lotus; Junun; Föllakzoid	50,000
10 August 2018 (Note: This show took place on the adjacent Sports Complex.)	Monsta X	The Connect World Tour	—	4,000
28 September 2018 (Note: The Ricardo Arjona concert on 28 September 2018 was originally scheduled to take place in the main field, but it was moved to the Athletic track for logistic reasons.)	Ricardo Arjona	Circo Soledad	—	50,000
30 October 2018	Shakira	El Dorado World Tour	Francisca Valenzuela	51,382
14 November 2018	Roger Waters	Us + Them Tour	—	52,624
18 January 2019	BoA; Super Junior; Shinee (Key, Tae-min); Girls' Generation (Yu-ri, Hyo-yeon); F(x) (Amber, Liu); Red Velvet; NCT (NCT 127, NCT Dream); EXO	SM Town	—	40,000
19 January 2019	BoA; Super Junior; Shinee (Key, Tae-min); Girls' Generation (Yu-ri, Hyo-yeon); F(x) (Amber, Liu); Red Velvet; NCT (NCT 127, NCT Dream); EXO	SM Town	—	40,000
20 March 2019	Paul McCartney	Freshen Up	—	49,900
13 October 2019	Muse	Simulation Theory World Tour	Kaiser Chiefs	15,701
15 October 2019	Iron Maiden	Legacy of the Beast World Tour	The Raven Age	61,896

2020s
Date	Headlining Artist	Concert or Tour	Opening acts	Attendance
20 September 2022	Coldplay	Music of the Spheres World Tour	Camila Cabello; Princesa Alba	256,916
21 September 2022	Coldplay	Music of the Spheres World Tour	Camila Cabello; Princesa Alba	256,916
23 September 2022	Coldplay	Music of the Spheres World Tour	Camila Cabello; Princesa Alba	256,916
24 September 2022	Coldplay	Music of the Spheres World Tour	Camila Cabello; Princesa Alba	256,916
27 September 2022	Daddy Yankee	La Última Vuelta World Tour	Polimá Westcoast	196,917
28 September 2022	Daddy Yankee	La Última Vuelta World Tour	Polimá Westcoast	196,917
29 September 2022	Daddy Yankee	La Última Vuelta World Tour	Polimá Westcoast	196,917
5 October 2022	Guns N' Roses	We're F'N' Back! Tour	Molotov; Frank's White Canvas	57,352
28 October 2022	Bad Bunny	World's Hottest Tour	Young Cister & Pailita; Pablito Pesadilla	55,278
29 October 2022	Bad Bunny	World's Hottest Tour	Pailita; Pablito Pesadilla	55,084
1 March 2024	Luis Miguel	Tour 2024	Mario Guerrero	75,743
2 March 2024	Luis Miguel	Tour 2024	Mario Guerrero	75,743
19 April 2024	Karol G	Mañana Será Bonito Tour	Denise Rosenthal	168,120
20 April 2024	Karol G	Mañana Será Bonito Tour	Denise Rosenthal	168,120
21 April 2024	Karol G	Mañana Será Bonito Tour	Denise Rosenthal	168,120
27 April 2024	Los Bunkers	Ven Aquí	Fabrizio Copano; Pedropiedra	100,000
28 April 2024	Los Bunkers	Ven Aquí	Fabrizio Copano; Pedropiedra	100,000
29 October 2024	Aventura	Cerrando Ciclos	Vicente Cifuentes	60,000
30 October 2024	Aventura	Cerrando Ciclos	Vicente Cifuentes	60,000
2 November 2024 (Note: This concert took place in the Estadio Nacional Park facilities.)	Slipknot; Disturbed; Mudvayne; Babymetal; Amon Amarth; Poppy; Orbit Culture	Knotfest	—	30,000
27 November 2024	Iron Maiden	The Future Past World Tour	Dogma	120,000
28 November 2024	Iron Maiden	The Future Past World Tour	Dogma	120,000
21 December 2024	Orquesta Sinfónica Nacional de Chile; Coro Sinfónico de la Universidad de Chile	Oda a la Fraternidad	—	35,000
4 April 2025 (Note: The Shakira concerts had been scheduled at the main field on March 2 and 3, 2025, but they were suspended on the afternoon of the same day due to a stage malfunction. Concerts were moved to the Park facilities.)	Shakira	Las Mujeres Ya No Lloran World Tour	Antonella Sigala	180,000
5 April 2025	Shakira	Las Mujeres Ya No Lloran World Tour	Antonella Sigala	180,000
7 April 2025	Shakira	Las Mujeres Ya No Lloran World Tour	Antonella Sigala	180,000
30 April 2025	System of a Down	Wake Up! Stadium Tour	Ego Kill Talent; Sinergia	65,000
23 May 2025	Myriam Hernández	Tauro World Tour	—	42,000
30 August 2025	Green Day	The Saviors Tour	Bad Nerves	55,000
14 October 2025	Guns N' Roses	Because What You Want & What You Get Are Two Completely Different Things	La Mala Senda	40,000
2 November 2025	Linkin Park	From Zero World Tour	Poppy; Tenemos Explosivos	50,000
11 November 2025	Dua Lipa	Radical Optimism Tour	Princesa Alba	109,000
12 November 2025	Dua Lipa	Radical Optimism Tour	Princesa Alba	109,000
19 November 2025	Oasis	Live '25	Richard Ashcroft	—N/a
22 November 2025 (Note: The Shakira concert on 22 November 2025 was originally scheduled to take place in the main field, but it was moved to the Estadio Nacional Park facilities for logistic reasons.)	Shakira	Las Mujeres Ya No Lloran World Tour	Denise Rosenthal	—N/a
7 December 2025	Los Jaivas	Los Jaivas, Siempre	—	—N/a
20 December 2025	Macha y el Bloque Depresivo	Bloque Nacional	—	—N/a
9 January 2026 (Note: The Bad Bunny concerts on January 9, 10 and 11, 2025, were originally scheduled on February 5, 6 and 7, respectively, but had to be resheculed due to his participation on the Super Bowl LX halftime show.)	Bad Bunny	Debí Tirar Más Fotos World Tour	Chuwi; Anttonias	—N/a
10 January 2026	Bad Bunny	Debí Tirar Más Fotos World Tour	Chuwi; Katteyes	—N/a
11 January 2026	Bad Bunny	Debí Tirar Más Fotos World Tour	Chuwi; Young Cister	—N/a
12 February 2026	Tini	Futttura Tour	Maya Okey	—N/a
14 February 2026	Chayanne	Bailemos Otra Vez Tour	Catalina y las Bordonas de Oro	—N/a
11 March 2026	AC/DC	Power Up Tour	The Pretty Reckless; Hielo Negro	—N/a
15 March 2026	AC/DC	Power Up Tour	The Pretty Reckless; Hielo Negro	—N/a
17 April 2026	Cris MJ	El Retorno del Rey	—	—N/a
8 May 2026	Korn	Latin America 2026	Spiritbox; Seven Hours After Violet	—N/a
14 October 2026	BTS	Arirang World Tour	192,878	—N/a
16 October 2026	BTS	Arirang World Tour	192,878	—N/a
17 October 2026	BTS	Arirang World Tour	192,878	—N/a
31 October 2026	Iron Maiden	Run for Your Lives World Tour	Mammoth; Nuclear	—N/a
1 November 2026	Iron Maiden	Run for Your Lives World Tour	Mammoth; Nuclear	—N/a
11 December 2026	Macha y el Bloque Depresivo	Estadio Nacional	—	—N/a
28 January 2027	Karol G	Viajando por el Mundo Tropitour	—	—N/a
29 January 2027	Karol G	Viajando por el Mundo Tropitour	—	—N/a
30 January 2027	Karol G	Viajando por el Mundo Tropitour	—	—N/a
31 January 2027	Karol G	Viajando por el Mundo Tropitour	—	—N/a
28 February 2027	Foo Fighters	Take Cover Tour	Adelaida; Aurora Voraz	—N/a
12 September 2027	Slipknot	(sic)est Stadium Tour	Marilyn Manson; Hatebreed; Mawiza	—N/a

Notes
- A concert by American artist Michael Jackson on October 21, part of his Dangerous World Tour, was cancelled on the same day due to health problems. Another performance on 23 October 1993 went on as scheduled.
- A concert by American Band Maroon 5, part of their 2020 Tour, was originally scheduled to take place at the Stadium on 28 February 2020, but it was moved to the Estadio Bicentenario de La Florida keeping the same date.
- A concert by Argentinian band Soda Stereo, part of their Gracias Totales - Soda Stereo concert series, was originally scheduled to take place at the Stadium on 7 March 2020, before being rescheduled several times during the pandemic, being ultimately moved to the Estadio Monumental David Arellano on 3 May 2022.
- A concert by American heavy metal band Metallica, part of their WorldWired Tour, was originally scheduled to take place at the Stadium on 15 April 2020, before being rescheduled several times during the pandemic, being ultimately moved to the Club Hípico, and made part of their 2022 Tour.
- A concert by Canadian recording artist Justin Bieber, part of his Justice World Tour, was scheduled on 7 September 2022, before being cancelled the day before due to Bieber proritizing his health.
- A concert by Italian tenor Andrea Bocelli, part of his Romanza World Tour, was scheduled to take place on 20 April 2026, but it was cancelled a month before due to "circumstances out of the artist and promoter's control".

== Capacity ==
The stadium was built with an original capacity of 48,000 spectators in 1937. At the time, some considered it a "white elephant" because it was thought that it could never be filled. The term also alluded to the charges of corruption against the administration of Arturo Alessandri, which oversaw the stadium's costly construction.

For the 1962 FIFA World Cup, seating capacity was increased to 74,000 with overflow areas allowing for a total of more than 80,000 people, by eliminating the cycling track that was moved to another location. Over the years, seating capacity was reduced to keep escape routes clear and prevent accidents.

For the 2000 World Junior Championships in Athletics, the installation of individual seats was required, which reduced capacity to 66,000 spectators. This requirement ensured that the stadium could not exceed capacity, as seen with the visit of Pope John Paul II in 1987 (believed to be attended by more than 90,000 people, though no accurate measurement could be taken as attendance was free, with no control), or the closing of the Telethon. The official capacity of the stadium as of 2014 is 48,665.

Preceded by Estadio Nacional; Lima	South American Championship; Finals Venue; 1941	Succeeded by Centenario Stadium; Montevideo
Preceded by Ginásio do Maracanãzinho; Rio de Janeiro	FIBA World Cup; Final Venue; 1959	Succeeded by Ginásio do Maracanãzinho; Rio de Janeiro
Preceded by Råsunda Stadium; Stockholm	FIFA World Cup; Final Venue; 1962	Succeeded by Wembley Stadium; London
Preceded by Estádio do Maracanã; Rio de Janeiro	Copa América; Final Round Matches; 1991	Succeeded by Estadio Monumental Isidro Romero Carbo; Guayaquil
Preceded by Kungliga Tennishallen; Stockholm	Davis Cup; Final Venue; 1976	Succeeded by White City Stadium; Sydney
Preceded by El Monumental; Buenos Aires	Copa América; Final Venue; 2015	Succeeded by MetLife Stadium; East Rutherford
Preceded by Two-legged Final	Copa Libertadores; Final Venue; 2019	Succeeded by TBD; TBD
Preceded by Estadio Nacional de Lima; Lima	Pan American Games; Opening and Closing Ceremonies; 2023	Succeeded by TBD; TBD
