= List of number-one Billboard Latin Pop Airplay songs of 2006 =

The Billboard Latin Pop Songs is a chart that ranks the best-performing Spanish-language Pop music singles of the United States. Published by Billboard magazine, the data are compiled by Nielsen SoundScan based collectively on each single's weekly airplay.

== Chart history ==
Issue date	Song	Artist(s)	Ref.
January 7	"Acompañame A Estar Solo"	Ricardo Arjona	
January 14	"Acompañame A Estar Solo"	Ricardo Arjona	
January 21	"Acompañame A Estar Solo"	Ricardo Arjona	
January 28	"Suelta Mi Mano"	Sin Bandera	
February 4	"Suelta Mi Mano"	Sin Bandera	
February 11	"Como Si No Nos Hubiéramos Amado"	Laura Pausini	
February 18	"Como Si No Nos Hubiéramos Amado"	Laura Pausini	
February 25	"Lo Que Me Gusta a Mí"	Juanes	
March 4	"Lo Que Me Gusta a Mí"	Juanes	
March 11	"Lo Que Me Gusta a Mí"	Juanes	
March 18	"Lo Que Me Gusta a Mí"	Juanes	
March 25	"Lo Que Me Gusta a Mí"	Juanes	
April 1	"Lo Que Me Gusta a Mí"	Juanes	
April 8	"Lo Que Me Gusta a Mí"	Juanes	
April 15	"Lo Que Me Gusta a Mí"	Juanes	
April 22	"Lo Que Me Gusta a Mí"	Juanes	
April 29	"Lo Que Me Gusta a Mí"	Juanes	
May 6	"Volverte a Amar"	Alejandra Guzmán	
May 13	"Volverte a Amar"	Alejandra Guzmán	
May 20	"Volverte a Amar"	Alejandra Guzmán	
May 27	"Volverte a Amar"	Alejandra Guzmán	
June 3	"Volverte a Amar"	Alejandra Guzmán	
June 10	"Volverte a Amar"	Alejandra Guzmán	
June 17	"Volverte a Amar"	Alejandra Guzmán	
June 24	"Volverte a Amar"	Alejandra Guzmán	
July 1	"Volverte a Amar"	Alejandra Guzmán	
July 8	"Hips Don't Lie"	Shakira featuring Wyclef Jean	
July 15	"Hips Don't Lie"	Shakira featuring Wyclef Jean	
July 22	"Me Voy"	Julieta Venegas	
July 29	"Me Voy"	Julieta Venegas	
August 5	"Labios Compartidos"	Maná	
August 12	"Labios Compartidos"	Maná	
August 19	"Labios Compartidos"	Maná	
August 26	"Labios Compartidos"	Maná	
September 2	"Labios Compartidos"	Maná	
September 9	"Labios Compartidos"	Maná	
September 16	"Labios Compartidos"	Maná	
September 23	"Labios Compartidos"	Maná	
September 30	"Labios Compartidos"	Maná	
October 7	"Labios Compartidos"	Maná	
October 14	"Labios Compartidos"	Maná	
October 21	"Ni Una Sola Palabra"	Paulina Rubio	
October 28	"Ni Una Sola Palabra"	Paulina Rubio	
November 3	"Ni Una Sola Palabra"	Paulina Rubio	
November 11	"Ser O Parecer"	RBD	
November 18	"Tu Recuerdo"	Ricky Martin featuring La Mari	
November 25	"Te Lo Agradezco, Pero No"	Alejandro Sanz featuring Shakira	
December 2	"Tu Recuerdo"	Ricky Martin featuring La Mari	
December 9	"Tu Recuerdo"	Ricky Martin featuring La Mari	
December 16	"Bendita Tu Luz"	Maná featuring Juan Luis Guerra	
December 23	"Tu Recuerdo"	Ricky Martin featuring La Mari	
December 30	"Tu Recuerdo"	Ricky Martin featuring La Mari	

== See also ==
- List of number-one Billboard Hot Latin Songs of 2006
