= Run for Your Lives World Tour =

2025–26 concert tour by Iron Maiden

Run For Your Lives World Tour
- Tour by Iron Maiden
- Promotional poster
- Location: Asia; Europe; North America; Oceania; South America
- Start date: 27 May 2025
- End date: 16 May 2027
- Legs: 3
- No. of shows: 107
- Supporting acts: Halestorm; The Raven Age; Avatar; Anthrax; Megadeth; Evergrey; Trivium; Alter Bridge; Mammoth; Nuclear; The Darkness; Airbourne; The Hu; The Almighty; Bullet for My Valentine
- Attendance: 2.15 million (69 shows)
- Box office: $225.6 million (69 shows)

Iron Maiden concert chronology
- The Future Past World Tour (2023–2024); Run For Your Lives World Tour (2025–2027)

The Run For Your Lives World Tour is a concert tour by the English heavy metal band Iron Maiden. It began on 27 May 2025 in Budapest, Hungary, and is set to conclude on 16 May 2027, in Ocean City, Maryland. This is the band's first concert tour in more than four decades not to feature drummer Nicko McBrain, following his retirement from touring in December 2024, and being replaced by British Lion member Simon Dawson as a touring drummer. After the tour's conclusion, the band was set to take a year long break from touring in 2027 but then they announced additional dates in the US for 2027.

As of November 2026, the tour has grossed $225.6 million from a total of 69 headlining performances, with over 2.15 million people in attendance.

== Background ==
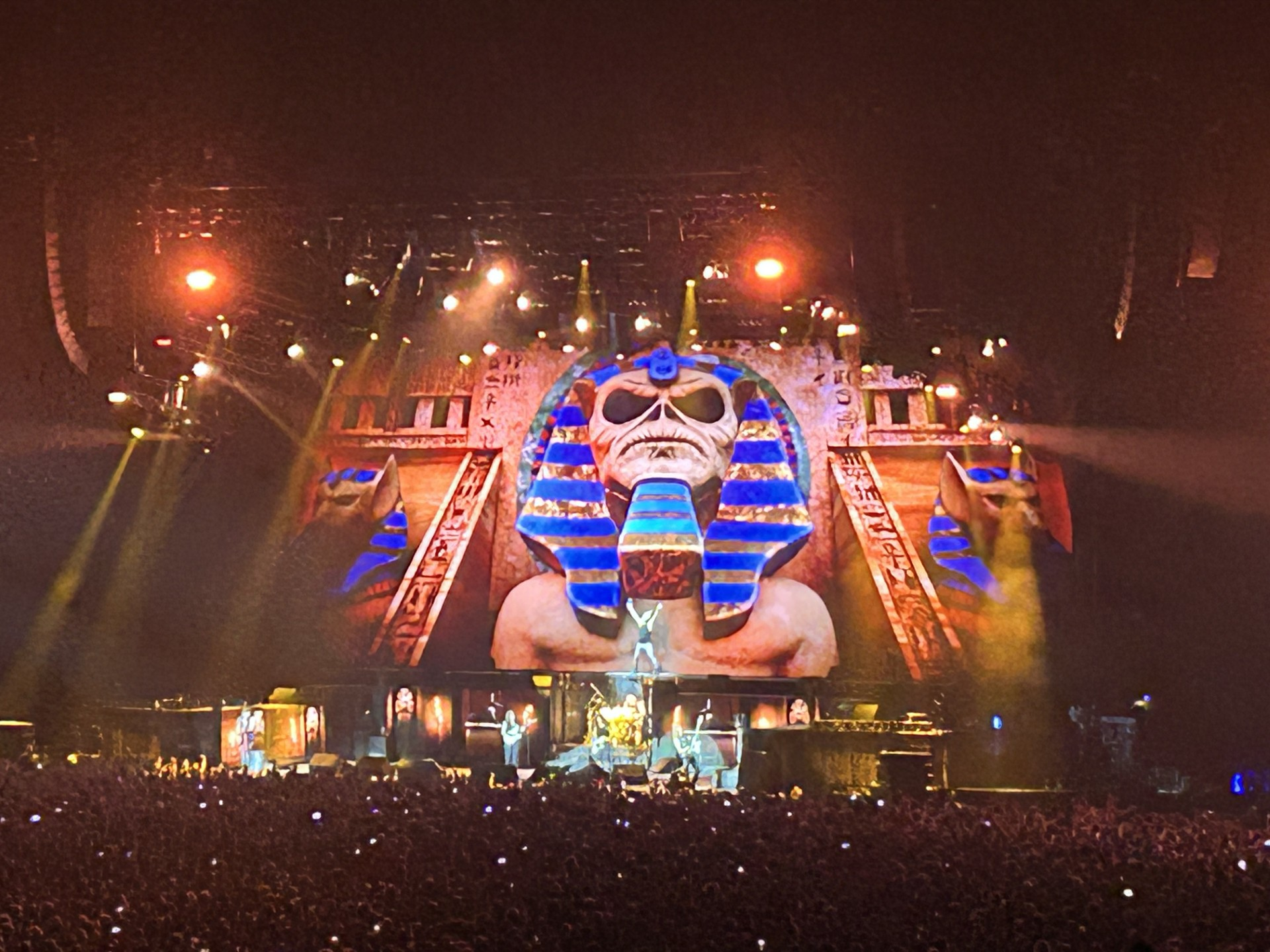
Iron Maiden performing "Powerslave" in Paris, 2025.

On 19 September 2024, the band announced the Run For Your Lives World Tour, a celebration of the band's 50th anniversary since their formation in 1975. It was also confirmed that the set list for the tour would be focused on the band's first nine albums, which Bruce Dickinson had promised would be a "set list for the ages". This tour is the first since 1983's World Piece Tour not to feature drummer Nicko McBrain, and first to feature his touring replacement Simon Dawson.

The first thirty-two shows for the European leg in 2025 sold over a million tickets. According to data published in the monthly industry magazine Pollstar, since 1982, more than 900 solo concerts in North America had generated more than $1 billion in revenue. The magazine also published its annual ranking of the world's highest-earning artists, based on individual concert ticket sales data from November 2024 to the end of October 2025. Iron Maiden reached the fifth position in their career, one of their highest, with a revenue of $128 million and net ticket sales of 1.32 million for 41 concerts during that time frame.

Iron Maiden entered at number 19 in Pollstar's Top 25 Most Popular Concert Artists of the New Millennium with net sales with 10 million tickets from 620 individual concerts played between 2001 and 2025. The band also landed in the Top 3 of Billboard's Top Rock Tours 2025 chart. According to Billboard, the group sold 1.5 million tickets, generating approximately $150.9 million in revenue.

On 18 September 2025, the band announced an extension of their tour for Europe, set to take place in 2026. On 23 October 2025, the band added shows for North America cities. On 12 December 2025, Iron Maiden announced an extensive Central and South America tour. Following the 2026 shows, the band are set to take a break from touring in 2027. On 26 February 2026, the band revealed the Oceania and Japan shows in November that year, which are set to be their final shows of the tour before their touring hiatus through 2027. On 4 March 2026, the band rescheduled the 26 September performance at Los Angeles' BMO Stadium to 27 September due to a scheduling issue with a neighbouring college football game at the Los Angeles Memorial Coliseum. On 5 March 2026, the band added one extra date for the Auckland and Brisbane shows due to overwhelming demand.

On 16 October 2026, Iron Maiden announced a final leg in North America for 2027.

== Set list ==
The following set list was performed in Budapest, Hungary on 27 May 2025. It is not intended to represent a majority of the performances throughout the tour.

1. "The Ides of March"
2. "Murders in the Rue Morgue"
3. "Wrathchild"
4. "Killers"
5. "Phantom of the Opera"
6. "The Number of the Beast"
7. "The Clairvoyant"
8. "Powerslave"
9. "2 Minutes to Midnight"
10. "Rime of the Ancient Mariner"
11. "Run to the Hills"
12. "Seventh Son of a Seventh Son"
13. "The Trooper"
14. "Hallowed Be Thy Name"
15. "Iron Maiden"
  Encore
16. "Aces High"
17. "Fear of the Dark"
18. "Wasted Years"

=== Alterations ===
- During the 2026 leg of the tour, "The Clairvoyant" was replaced by "Infinite Dreams".

== Tour dates ==
List of 2025 concerts
Date (2025)	City	Country	Venue	Opening acts
27 May	Budapest	Hungary	László Papp Budapest Sports Arena	Halestorm
28 May	Budapest	Hungary	László Papp Budapest Sports Arena	Halestorm
31 May	Prague	Czech Republic	Letňany	Halestorm
1 June	Bratislava	Slovakia	Tipos Aréna	Halestorm
5 June (Note: The performance on 5 June 2025, was a part of Trondheim Rocks.)	Trondheim	Norway	Dahls Arena	—N/a
7 June	Stavanger	Norway	SR-Bank Arena	Halestorm
9 June	Copenhagen	Denmark	Royal Arena	Halestorm
12 June	Stockholm	Sweden	3Arena	Halestorm
13 June	Stockholm	Sweden	3Arena	Halestorm
16 June	Helsinki	Finland	Olympic Stadium	Halestorm
19 June (Note: The performance on 19 June 2025, was a part of Graspop Metal Meeting.)	Dessel	Belgium	Festivalpark Stenehei	—N/a
21 June	Birmingham	England	Utilita Arena	The Raven Age
22 June	Manchester	England	Co-op Live	The Raven Age
25 June	Malahide	Ireland	Malahide Castle	Halestorm; The Raven Age
28 June	London	England	London Stadium	Halestorm; The Raven Age
30 June	Glasgow	Scotland	OVO Hydro	The Raven Age
3 July (Note: The performance on 3 July 2025, was a part of Eurockéennes.)	Sermamagny	France	Presqu'ile du Malsaucy	—N/a
5 July	Madrid	Spain	Metropolitano Stadium	Avatar
6 July	Lisbon	Portugal	MEO Arena	Avatar
9 July	Zürich	Switzerland	Hallenstadion	Avatar
11 July	Gelsenkirchen	Germany	Veltins-Arena	Avatar
13 July	Padua	Italy	Stadio Euganeo	Avatar
15 July	Bremen	Germany	Bürgerweide	Avatar
17 July	Vienna	Austria	Ernst-Happel-Stadion	Avatar
19 July	Paris	France	Paris La Défense Arena	Avatar
20 July	Paris	France	Paris La Défense Arena	Avatar
23 July	Arnhem	Netherlands	GelreDome	Avatar
25 July	Frankfurt	Germany	Deutsche Bank Park	Avatar
26 July	Stuttgart	Germany	Cannstatter Wasen	Avatar
29 July	Berlin	Germany	Waldbühne	Avatar
30 July	Berlin	Germany	Waldbühne	Avatar
2 August	Warsaw	Poland	PGE Narodowy	Avatar

List of 2026 concerts
Date (2026)	City	Country	Venue	Opening acts
23 May	Athens	Greece	Olympic Stadium	Anthrax
26 May	Sofia	Bulgaria	Vasil Levski Stadium	Anthrax
28 May	Bucharest	Romania	Arena Națională	Anthrax
30 May	Bratislava	Slovakia	Tehelné pole	Anthrax
2 June	Hanover	Germany	Heinz von Heiden Arena	Megadeth
4 June (Note: The performance on 4 June 2026, was a part of Sweden Rock Festival.)	Sölvesborg	Sweden	Norje Havsbad	—N/a
6 June (Note: The performance on 6 June 2026, was a part of Rock im Park.)	Nuremberg	Germany	Zeppelinfeld	—N/a
7 June (Note: The performance on 7 June 2026, was a part of Rock am Ring.)	Nürburg	Germany	Nürburgring	—N/a
10 June	Amsterdam	Netherlands	Ziggo Dome	Evergrey
13 June (Note: The performance on 13 June 2026, was a part of Nova Rock.)	Nickelsdorf	Austria	Pannonia Fields II	—N/a
14 June (Note: The performance on 14 June 2026, was a part of Rock for People.)	Hradec Králové	Czech Republic	Park 360	—N/a
17 June	Milan	Italy	San Siro Stadium	Trivium
19 June (Note: The performance on 19 June 2026, was a part of Hellfest.)	Clisson	France	Val de Moine	—N/a
22 June	Paris	France	Paris La Défense Arena	Evergrey
24 June (Note: The performance on 24 June 2026, was a part of Copenhell.)	Copenhagen	Denmark	Refshaleøen	—N/a
25 June (Note: The performance on 25 June 2026, was a part of Tons of Rock.)	Oslo	Norway	Ekebergsletta	—N/a
28 June	Lyon	France	Groupama Stadium	Anthrax
29 June (Note: The performance on 29 June 2026, was a part of Live is Live.)	Antwerp	Belgium	Middenvijver Park	—N/a
2 July (Note: The performance on 2 July 2026, was a part of Resurrection Fest.)	Viveiro	Spain	Campo de fútbol Celeiro	—N/a
4 July (Note: The performance on 4 July 2026, was a part of Rock Imperium.)	Cartagena	Spain	Parque de la Cuesta del Batel	—N/a
7 July	Lisbon	Portugal	Estádio da Luz	Anthrax
11 July (Note: The performance on 11 July 2026, was a part of Eddfest.)	Stevenage	England	Knebworth Park	—N/a
29 August	Toronto	Canada	Scotiabank Arena	Megadeth
30 August	Toronto	Canada	Scotiabank Arena	Megadeth
3 September	Montreal	Canada	Parc Jean-Drapeau	Megadeth; Anthrax
5 September	Harrison	United States	Sports Illustrated Stadium	Megadeth; Anthrax
6 September	Harrison	United States	Sports Illustrated Stadium	Megadeth; Anthrax
9 September	Boston	United States	TD Garden	Megadeth
11 September	Bristow	United States	Jiffy Lube Live	Megadeth
12 September	Charlotte	United States	Truliant Amphitheater	Megadeth
15 September	Hershey	United States	Hersheypark Stadium	Megadeth
17 September (Note: The performance on 17 September 2026, is set to be a part of Louder Than Life.)	Louisville	United States	Kentucky Exposition Center	—N/a
19 September	Prior Lake (Note: Labelled as Shakopee in promotional material.)	United States	Mystic Lake Amphitheater	Megadeth
22 September	Tinley Park (Note: Labeled as Chicago in promotional material.)	United States	Credit Union 1 Amphitheatre	Megadeth
25 September	Los Angeles	United States	BMO Stadium	Megadeth; Anthrax
27 September	Los Angeles	United States	BMO Stadium	Megadeth; Anthrax
29 September	San Antonio	United States	Alamodome	Megadeth; Anthrax
2 October	Mexico City	Mexico	Estadio GNP Seguros	Anthrax
5 October	San Salvador	El Salvador	Estadio Jorge “Mágico” González	The Raven Age; Souls of Steel
8 October	San José	Costa Rica	Estadio Nacional	The Raven Age
11 October	Bogotá	Colombia	Vive Claro	The Raven Age
14 October	Quito	Ecuador	Estadio Atahualpa	The Raven Age
17 October	Lima	Peru	Estadio Nacional	The Raven Age
20 October	Buenos Aires	Argentina	Estadio Tomás Adolfo Ducó	La H No Murió
21 October	Buenos Aires	Argentina	Estadio Tomás Adolfo Ducó	La H No Murió
25 October	São Paulo	Brazil	Nubank Parque	Alter Bridge
27 October	São Paulo	Brazil	Nubank Parque	Alter Bridge
28 October	Curitiba	Brazil	Arena da Baixada	Alter Bridge
31 October	Santiago	Chile	Estadio Nacional	Mammoth; Nuclear
1 November	Santiago	Chile	Estadio Nacional	Mammoth; Nuclear
7 November	Auckland	New Zealand	Spark Arena	Megadeth
8 November	Auckland	New Zealand	Spark Arena	Megadeth
11 November	Adelaide	Australia	Adelaide Entertainment Centre	Megadeth
13 November	Melbourne	Australia	AAMI Park	Megadeth
15 November	Sydney	Australia	Allianz Stadium	Megadeth
18 November	Brisbane	Australia	Brisbane Entertainment Centre	Megadeth
19 November	Brisbane	Australia	Brisbane Entertainment Centre	Megadeth
24 November	Yokohama	Japan	K-Arena Yokohama	—N/a
25 November	Yokohama	Japan	K-Arena Yokohama	—N/a

List of 2027 concerts
Date (2027)	City	Country	Venue	Opening acts
14 April	Tacoma	United States	Tacoma Dome	Bullet for My Valentine; The Raven Age
16 April	Vancouver	Canada	Rogers Arena	Bullet for My Valentine; The Raven Age
18 April	Portland	United States	Moda Center	Bullet for My Valentine; The Raven Age
20 April	Wheatland	United States	Toyota Amphitheatre	Bullet for My Valentine; The Raven Age
22 April	Chula Vista	United States	North Island Credit Union Amphitheatre	Bullet for My Valentine; The Raven Age
24 April	San Bernardino	United States	Glen Helen Amphitheater	Bullet for My Valentine; The Raven Age
26 April	Phoenix	United States	Talking Stick Resort Amphitheatre	Bullet for My Valentine; The Raven Age
28 April	Dallas	United States	Dos Equis Pavilion	Bullet for My Valentine; The Raven Age
1 May	Tampa	United States	Benchmark International Arena	Bullet for My Valentine; The Raven Age
2 May	West Palm Beach	United States	iTHINK Financial Amphitheatre	Bullet for My Valentine; The Raven Age
5 May	Atlanta	United States	Lakewood Amphitheatre	Bullet for My Valentine; The Raven Age
7 May	Raleigh	United States	Coastal Credit Union Music Park at Walnut Creek	Bullet for My Valentine; The Raven Age
9 May	Hartford	United States	The Meadows Music Theatre	Bullet for My Valentine; The Raven Age
11 May	Elmont	United States	UBS Arena	Bullet for My Valentine; The Raven Age
14 May (Note: The performance on 14 May 2027, is set to be a part of Sonic Temple.)	Columbus	United States	Historic Crew Stadium	—N/a
16 May (Note: The performance on 16 May 2026, is set to be a part of Boardwalk Rock Festival.)	Ocean City	United States	Ocean City Boardwalk	—N/a
