= Te Lo Agradezco, Pero No =

- Remixes EP cover image

Single by Alejandro Sanz featuring Shakira

from the album El Tren de los Momentos
- Released: 11 December 2006
- Studio: El Coraje Estudio (Miami, FL)
- Length: 4:33
- Label: Warner Music Latina
- Songwriter: Sanz
- Producers: Sanz; Lulo Pérez

Alejandro Sanz singles chronology
"A la Primera Persona" (2006)	"Te Lo Agradezco, Pero No" (2006)	"Enséñame Tus Manos" (2007)

Shakira singles chronology
"Illegal" (2006)	"Te Lo Agradezco, Pero No" (2006)	"Las de la Intuición" / "Pure Intuition" (2007)

Music video
- "Te Lo Agradezco, Pero No" on YouTube

"Te Lo Agradezco, Pero No" (English: "I thank you, but no") is a song recorded by Spanish singer Alejandro Sanz and Colombian singer Shakira, for Sanz's eighth studio album El Tren de los Momentos (2006). It was released as the second single from the record in December 2006 by Warner Music Latina. The track was written by Sanz, while production was handled by him along with Lulo Pérez. "Te Lo Agradezco, Pero No" is the second duet recorded by the two singers, following "La Tortura" for Shakira's album Fijación Oral Vol. 1 (2005). The song came about after she approached Sanz, telling him that she wanted to collaborate on something different from her own material.

Upon its release, "Te Lo Agradezco, Pero No" was perceived as an album highlight by several music critics. It earned the duo multiple awards and nominations, including Song of the Year at the 2007 Premios Oye!. Commercially, the single was successful in Venezuela and on the American Latin music charts, where it topped the Billboard Hot Latin Songs and Latin Pop Airplay charts. A music video for the song, directed by Jaume de Laiguana, was filmed in Brooklyn and released on 11 January 2007. It is a continuation of the clip for Sanz's "A la Primera Persona" and it features the duo dancing together towards the end. Sanz performed the song live during his El Tren De Los Momentos Tour (2007–08).

== Background and release ==
"Te Lo Agradezco, Pero No" was written by Alejandro Sanz for his album El Tren de los Momentos (2006). He also handled the song's production together with Lulo Pérez. Shakira, a close friend of Sanz, was the one who approached him in order to sing on his album, asking of him to make sure that she sounds "nothing like she does on her own". "Te Lo Agradezco, Pero No" marks the second time Sanz and Shakira collaborated after "La Tortura", included on the latter's Fijación Oral, Vol. 1 (2005). Sanz stated, "I hadn't dared ask her if she wanted to do something with me, because it was a little like, 'I sing with you, now sing with me'. Plus, we didn't want it to be 'La Tortura 2' because we're very considerate of each other. She's the one who came and said, 'Hey, I want to sing'." He concluded the interview by saying that with the collaborations, he managed to expand his artistry by experimenting with new styles.

An extended play (EP) featuring several remixes of the song was released on 6 March 2007. Two of them — one done by Luny Tunes and the other one dubbed "Benztown Mixdown" — were included on the re-release of Sanz's album in 2007, El Tren de los Momentos: Edición Especial. "Te Lo Agradezco, Pero No" was also part of his compilation album Colección Definitiva (2011).

== Reception and accolades ==
In a review of El Tren de los Momentos, Jason Birchmeier of AllMusic pointed out "Te Lo Agradezco, Pero No" as a highlight on the album. In another article, he described the song as a "passionate duet". Chuck Arnold, Ralph Novak and Monique Jessen, writing for People magazine, also pointed out the track as one of the best on the record, adding that the duo managed to "again bring the tropical heat" with it. A writer of Billboard noted that instead of only trading vocals on the song, the singers delivered "full duet lines". David Saavedra, a critic of the Spanish newspaper El Mundo, found elements of Latin flamenco in "Te Lo Agradezco, Pero No" and noted how it was a proof of Sanz's departure from his early-career material.

The single won an Oye! award in Mexico for Song of the Year in 2007. It was also nominated in the category The Perfect Combo at the 2007 Premios Juventud. At the 16th Annual ASCAP Latin Music Awards held on 16 May 2008, "Te Lo Agradezco Pero No" was recognized as the Pop/Ballad of the Year. The recording further was nominated in the category for Best Vocal Duet or Collaboration at the 2008 Latin Billboard Music Awards, but lost to "Pegao" (2006) by Wisin & Yandel. "Te Lo Agradezco, Pero No" was included at number seven on the list of 15 Best Duets by Shakira published by E! Online Latino in 2016.

On the US Billboard Hot Latin Songs chart, "Te Lo Agradezco, Pero No" debuted at number 22 for the chart issue dated 10 February 2007. It entered the top ten of the chart two weeks later and ascended to the top in its fifth charting week on 10 March 2007 replacing "Manda una Señal" by Maná, spending a total of 14 weeks on the chart. It further managed to top the Latin Pop Airplay chart, and peaked at the fourth position on the Tropical Songs chart. At the end of 2007, "Te Lo Agradezco, Pero No" was ranked as the 36th best-selling Latin song in the United States. The song attained similar success on the Record Report charts in Venezuela, where it topped the Top Latino chart and climbed to the fourth position on the Pop Rock chart. In 2007, the single was certified Platinum by Productores de Música de España (PROMUSICAE) for shipment of 40,000 copies in Spain; its ringtone was also certified Gold in the country.

== Music video ==
A music video for "Te Lo Agradezco, Pero No" directed by Jaume de Laiguana was filmed in Brooklyn in 2006. It was released on 11 January 2007, acting as a continuation for the clip of Sanz's previous single "A la Primera Persona" (2006). However, in "Te Lo Agradezco, Pero No", the roles of Sanz and his love interest change and he clarifies that "there are no promises that are worthy after everything is finished". By Shakira's request, this was the first video where Sanz is performing choreography. A making-of clip about the music video was included on the DVD of El Tren de los Momentos: Edición Especial (2007). The music video for "Te Lo Agradezco, Pero No" was also featured on Sanz's compilation album Colección Definitiva (2011). The visual was well-received and was nominated in the category for Video of the Year at the Los Premios MTV Latinoamérica 2007 held on 18 October 2007.

== Live performances ==
"Te Lo Agradezco, Pero No" was part of the set list of Sanz's seventh El Tren De Los Momentos Tour (2007–08) which visited countries in North and South America and Europe. A live performance of the song, filmed on 23 March 2007 in Argentina, was included on his third live album El Tren de los Momentos: En Vivo Desde Buenos Aires (2007). The video was also uploaded to Sanz's official YouTube account on 15 February 2010. The song was further performed live during the Premios Oye! 2007 held on 24 August in Veracruz, Mexico, while another appearance followed at a humanitarian concert organized by the ALAS Foundation in May 2008.

== Track listing and formats ==
- Benelux/Mexican/US single
1. "Te Lo Agradezco, Pero No" (Album Version) – 4:34
- Spain CD single/Maxi single
1. "Te Lo Agradezco, Pero No" (Album Version) – 4:34
2. "Te Lo Agradezco, Pero No" (Luny Tunes & Tainy Remix) – 3:07
3. "Te Lo Agradezco, Pero No" (Soft Reggaeton) – 4:01
4. "Te Lo Agradezco, Pero No" (Beach Club Mix by Roger Sanchez) – 8:26
- European CD/Maxi Single
1. "Te Lo Agradezco, Pero No" (Benz town Mixdown by Petter Hoff)
2. "Te Lo Agradezco, Pero No" (Luny Tunes & Tainy Remix) – 3:07
3. "Te Lo Agradezco, Pero No" (Soft Reggaeton by Carlos Jean) – 4:01
4. "Te Lo Agradezco, Pero No" (Album Version) – 4:34

== Charts ==
=== Weekly charts ===
Chart (2006–2007)	Peak position
US Hot Latin Songs (Billboard)	1
US Latin Pop Airplay (Billboard)	1
US Tropical Airplay (Billboard)	4
Venezuela Pop Rock (Record Report)	4
Venezuela Top Latino (Record Report)	1

=== Year-end charts ===
Chart (2007)	Peak position
US Hot Latin Songs (Billboard)	36
US Latin Pop Songs (Billboard)	14

== Certifications ==
Region	Certification	Certified units/sales
Mexico (AMPROFON) Master ringtone	Gold	10,000^{*}
Spain (Promusicae)	Platinum	20,000^{^}
Spain (Promusicae) Ringtone	Gold	10,000^{*}
^{*} Sales figures based on certification alone.^{^} Shipments figures based on certification alone.

== See also ==
- List of number-one Billboard Hot Latin Pop Airplay of 2006
- List of number-one Billboard Hot Latin Songs of 2007
