= Tu Recuerdo (Ricky Martin song) =

2006 single by Ricky Martin

Single by Ricky Martin featuring La Mari and Tommy Torres

from the album MTV Unplugged
- Language: Spanish
- English title: "Your Memory"
- Released: September 25, 2006
- Recorded: August 17, 2006 in Miami, Florida
- Genre: Folk-pop
- Length: 4:07
- Label: Columbia; Sony BMG Norte
- Songwriter: Tommy Torres
- Producer: Tommy Torres

Ricky Martin singles chronology
"It's Alright" (2006)	"Tu Recuerdo" (2006)	"Pégate" (2006)

Live Performance
- "Tu Recuerdo" on YouTube

"Tu Recuerdo" (transl. "Your Memory") is a song recorded by Puerto Rican singer Ricky Martin, featuring guest appearances from Spanish singer La Mari and Puerto Rican record producer Tommy Torres for Martin's first live album, MTV Unplugged (2006). The song was written and produced by Torres. It was released to radio stations by Sony BMG Norte as the lead single from the album on September 25, 2006. A Spanish language acoustic ballad and folk-pop song, it is about a person who is grasping on to the memory of someone. It received widely positive reviews from music critics, who complimented the singers' paced voices and emotional lyrics.

"Tu Recuerdo" was nominated for Record of the Year at the 8th Annual Latin Grammy Awards. The song was commercially successful, reaching number one in five countries, including Argentina and Mexico, as well as the top five in Chile, Paraguay, and Spain. It also reached the summit of the Billboard's Hot Latin Songs and Latin Pop Airplay charts. The track was certified quadruple platinum in both Mexico and Spain. To promote the song, Martin performed it at the 2006 Latin Grammy Awards. Several contestants on various music talent shows have covered the song, including Camilo.

== Background and release ==
Ricky Martin's team and MTV had discussed an MTV Unplugged for years, but it became more serious after Martin's the One Night Only with Ricky Martin tour, which featured an acoustic segment. Finally, Martin taped his MTV Unplugged set in Miami, Florida on August 17, 2006, performing both romantic ballads and up-tempo tropical dance songs. Sony BMG Norte's president, Kevin Lawrie told Billboard about the set:

We've been counting down the days to present him in this very credible and stripped-down fashion. When you become a white-hot pop star, the perception of the public after a while may turn cynical, [as if to say], 'Well, maybe Ricky was just something that was manufactured.' This is a perfect opportunity to dispel any of that. In the acoustic 'Unplugged' format, there isn't much of a way to hide anything. It's really Ricky unmasked. And that's something that a lot of people haven't seen yet, and that's compelling in itself.

During the performance, Martin debuted three new tracks, including "Tu Recuerdo", which he performed along with Tommy Torres and La Mari of Spanish band Chambao. It became the most applauded new song and was released to radio stations as the lead single from the album on September 25, 2006. Its video was also premiered on MTV Latin America on the same date. The song was later included as the fourth track on Martin's first live album MTV Unplugged, released November 7, 2006. During an interview with ABC, La Mari described singing with Martin as "the most surreal moment of [her] life".

== Music and lyrics ==
"Tu Recuerdo"
A 15-second sample of the chorus, which features a "slow" melody.

Musically, "Tu Recuerdo" is a Spanish language acoustic ballad and folk-pop song, that features flamenco influences and uses guitar and Puerto Rican cuatro. The track was written and produced by Torres, and runs for a total of 4 minutes and 7 seconds. Lyrically, "Tu Recuerdo" which translates to "Your Memory" in English, is a romantic love song, about a person who is grasping on to the memory of someone. Throughout it, Martin sings about his lost love that their memory is still there with him, like a "downpour", with lyrics including, "Tu recuerdo sigue aquí como un aguacero / Quema y moja por igual / Sé que te tengo que olvidar / Y ya no sé lo qué pensar / Si tu recuerdo me hace bien o me hace mal" (Your memory is still here like a downpour / Burns and wet alike / I know I have to forget you / And I no longer know what to think / If your memory does me good or does me bad).

== Critical reception ==
"Tu Recuerdo" has been met with widely positive reviews from music critics. Jordan Levin from Miami Herald gave the song a positive review, labeling it "a lovely folk-pop piece". He also praised the unidentified cuatro player, describing him as "electrifyingly good". In his review for Great Falls Tribune, he picked it as one of the "pod picks" of the album, calling the song "lovely". An author of ABC named the track "a delicious ballad", noting the "sensitivity of both interpreters and masterfully paced voices". Agustin Gurza from Los Angeles Times described it as beautiful, calling Martin's choice of "the relatively unknown" La Mari "a magical choice". Judy Cantor-Navas from Billboard credited "Tu Recuerdo" as the song that "made Lamari a recognized name in the United States". Also from Billboard, Leila Cobo labeled it "a little jewel".

At La Voz de Galicia, a writer gave the song a positive review, saying "this sweet ballad enchanted everyone". Edgar Torres of Metro Puerto Rico named it a "smash hit", while Los 40's Nacho Herrero stated that Martin "has triumphed all over the world" with "Tu Recuerdo". Also from Los 40, Beatriz Rodríguez Ruiz acclaimed its "high doses of romanticism". Additionally, an author of LAE Madrid stated that "in this famous song" by Martin, "nostalgia and heartbreak predominate". In 2015, Univision staff ranked the track as Martin's tenth best ballad. In 2020, MTV Argentina ranked it as one of Martin's best songs. The following year, MDZ Online staff listed "Tu Recuerdo" among "5 unmissable hits by young Ricky Martin", and described it as "super emotional". In the same year, Claudia González Alvarado from Chilango ranked it as his eighth-best ballad, naming it "one of the most sensitive ballads in his repertoire".

== Accolades ==
In 2019, La República ranked "Tu Recuerdo" at number 25 on their list of "The 50 Best Love Songs to Dedicate to Your Partner". In 2021, Billboard listed it among the "10 Latin Songs to Fuel Your Long-Distance Relationship" on Valentine's Day. Spotify placed it at number 16 on the playlist of "Time 100's Most Inspiring Songs". Los 40 staff ranked it as one of the Best Collaborations in Spanish, and placed it on an unranked list of "Songs for the Day of Hispanidad". "Tu Recuerdo" has received a number of awards and nominations. It was nominated for Record of the Year at the 8th Annual Latin Grammy Awards, and although Billboard and Miami Herald's critics had predicted it to be the winner, it lost to "La llave de mi corazón" by Juan Luis Guerra.

Awards and nominations for "Tu Recuerdo"
Organization	Year	Award	Result	Ref.
Premios Festival EÑE	2006	Best Male Solo Artist Song in Spanish	Won	
Billboard Latin Music Awards	2007	Hot Latin Songs of the Year, Vocal Duet or Collaboration	Nominated	
Billboard Latin Music Awards	2007	Latin Pop Airplay Song of the Year, Duo or Group	Nominated	
Latin Grammy Awards	2007	Record of the Year	Nominated	
Los Premios MTV Latinoamérica	2007	Song of the Year	Nominated	
Premios Juventud	2007	Best Ballad	Nominated	
ASCAP Latin Awards	2008	Pop/Ballad Song of the Year	Won	
Premio Lo Nuestro	2008	Pop Song of the Year	Nominated	

== Commercial performance ==
"Tu Recuerdo" became a very successful collaboration, giving La Mari her only one hit single. In the United States, it became a sleeper hit. The song debuted at number 48 on Billboard's Hot Latin Songs chart on October 14, 2006, becoming Martin's 31st entry on the chart, and Torres' fifth. In its sixth week, it became Martin's 19th top 10 track, and Torres' first. It subsequently reached number one on the chart issue dated December 23, 2006, and remained at the top for three consecutive weeks. Therefore, "Tu Recuerdo" became Martin's 10th crowning hit, making him the artist with the fourth-most number-one songs on the chart following Enrique Iglesias, Luis Miguel, and Gloria Estefan. The song has since become both Martin and Torres' longest-charting hit, spending 35 weeks on the chart. It finished 2007 as the third biggest hit on the US Hot Latin Songs year-end chart.

"Tu Recuerdo" reached number one on the US Latin Pop Airplay chart on November 18, 2006, becoming Martin's sixth number one hit on the chart, and Torres' first. The song stayed at the top for 13 weeks, tying with "Tal Vez" as his longest-running number one on the chart and making it the 16th longest-running number-one single on the chart in history, and ranking as the 15th biggest hit on its All-Time chart. Additionally, it peaked at numbers 3 and 25 on Billboard's Tropical Songs and Latin Rhythm Airplay charts, respectively. On the US Billboard Hot 100 chart, "Tu Recuerdo" peaked at number 89 on the chart issue dated December 23, 2006, becoming Martin's 12th entry and Torres' first. As of January 2011, the track has sold over 82,000 digital copies in the United States and stands as Martin's fifth best-selling single.

Besides the United States, "Tu Recuerdo" reached number one in Argentina, Colombia, Mexico, Uruguay, and Venezuela. The song was certified quadruple platinum by the Asociación Mexicana de Productores de Fonogramas y Videogramas (AMPROFON), denoting sales of over 400,000 copies in Mexico. In Spain, the track peaked at number two, where it was certified quadruple platinum by the Productores de Música de España (PROMUSICAE), denoting shipments of over 80,000 copies in the country. It subsequently finished 2007 as the seventh biggest hit on the country's year-end chart. It also peaked at number two in both Chile and Paraguay, and number 10 on Billboard's Euro Digital Tracks. Additionally, the master ringtone was certified triple platinum in Spain and gold in Mexico, denoting shipments of over 60,000 copies and sales of over 10,000 copies in the countries, respectively.

== Live performances and appearances in media ==
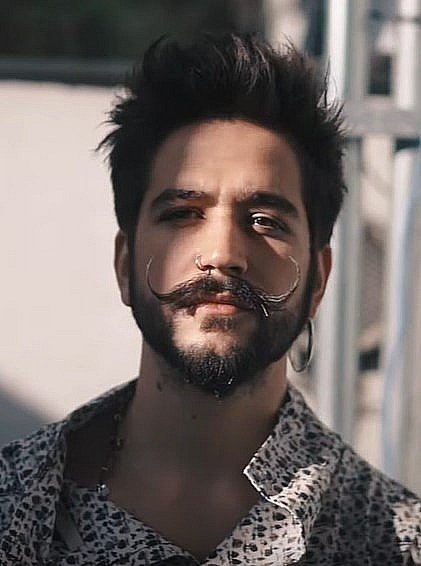
Camilo (pictured) covered "Tu Recuerdo" on the second season's finale of El Factor X.

Martin's acoustic performance of "Tu Recuerdo" on MTV Unplugged was uploaded on the singer's YouTube channel on October 3, 2009, and has received over 120 million views, as of September 2021. The song was included on the set lists for Martin's the Black and White Tour, the Música + Alma + Sexo World Tour, the Live in Mexico tour, the One World Tour, the Movimiento Tour, and the Enrique Iglesias and Ricky Martin Live in Concert tour. Martin performed a medley of "Tu Recuerdo" and "Pégate" at the 7th Annual Latin Grammy Awards on November 2, 2006. He sang the former on a stage designed as a city with falling snow. He performed "Tu Recuerdo" along with his other hits during the 48th, 55th, and 61st editions of the Viña del Mar International Song Festival in 2007, 2014, and 2020, respectively. Also, Torres performed the track along with his other hits during the 55th Viña del Mar International Song Festival on February 28, 2014.

"Tu Recuerdo" has been covered by several contestants on various music talent shows. Colombian singer Camilo performed it on the second season's finale of El Factor X in 2007 and was voted the winner of the season. Gonzalo Andrada and María Belén Correa competed in a battle of covering the song as a duet on season one of the singing competition television series La Voz Argentina in 2012, which Andrada won. In 2019, Correa Kari Santoyo and Jonathan Martinez competed in a battle of covering the song on the first season of the American edition of La Voz in 2019, which Santoyo won. All coaches acclaimed their performance, with Wisin saying that he loved their both vocal colors, and Carlos Vives calling them "one of the most fought duets". Nicole Neumann danced to the salsa version of "Tu Recuerdo" on the Argentine dance competition television series El Musical de tus Sueños in 2009.

== Formats and track listings ==
- US / MEX promotional CD single
1. "Tu Recuerdo" (featuring La Mari of Chambao) – 4:07
- US promotional CD single
1. "Tu Recuerdo" (featuring La Mari of Chambao) (salsa version) – 3:59

== Credits and personnel ==
Credits adapted from Tidal.

- Ricky Martin – vocal, associated performer
- La Mari De Chambao – associated performer, featured artist
- Tommy Torres – associated performer, featured artist, producer, composer, lyricist, acoustic guitar, arranger
- David Cabrera – acoustic guitar, director
- José Antonio Molina – arranger
- Andres Casanova – assistant engineer
- Carlos David Perez – background vocal
- Liza Quinn – background vocal
- George Noriega – background vocal
- Phil McArthur – bass
- Waldo Madera – drums
- Bruno del Granado – executive producer
- Bob Clearmountain – mixing engineer
- Brandon Duncan – mixing engineer
- Danny López – percussion
- Richard Bravo – percussion
- Mariauxy Castillo-Vitale – project coordinator
- Gustavo Borner – recording engineer

== Charts ==
=== Weekly charts ===
Weekly peak performance for "Tu Recuerdo"
Chart (2006–2007)	Peak position
Argentina (Associated Press)	1
Chile (Associated Press)	2
CIS Airplay (TopHit)	111
Colombia (Associated Press)	1
Europe (Billboard Euro Digital Tracks)	10
Mexico (Associated Press)	1
Paraguay (Associated Press)	2
Spain (PROMUSICAE)	2
Uruguay (Associated Press)	1
US Billboard Hot 100	89
US Hot Latin Songs (Billboard)	1
US Latin Pop Airplay (Billboard)	1
US Latin Rhythm Airplay (Billboard)	25
US Tropical Airplay (Billboard)	3
Venezuela Top 100 (Record Report)	1

=== Year-end charts ===
2007 year-end chart performance for "Tu Recuerdo"
Chart (2007)	Peak position
Spain (PROMUSICAE)	7
US Hot Latin Songs (Billboard)	3
US Latin Pop Airplay (Billboard)	4
US Tropical Airplay (Billboard)	39

2018-2020 year-end chart performance for "Tu Recuerdo"
Chart (2018)	Position
Puerto Rico Pop (Monitor Latino)	94
Chart (2019)	Position
Colombia Pop (Monitor Latino)	81
Puerto Rico Pop (Monitor Latino)	72
Chart (2020)	Position
Puerto Rico Pop (Monitor Latino)	97
Chart (2021)	Position
Puerto Rico Pop (Monitor Latino)	94
Chart (2023)	Position
Puerto Rico Pop (Monitor Latino)	91

=== Decade-end charts ===
2000s decade-end chart performance for "Tu Recuerdo"
Chart (2000–2009)	Position
US Hot Latin Songs (Billboard)	20

=== All-time charts ===
All-time chart position for "Tu Recuerdo"
Chart	Position
US Latin Pop Songs (Billboard)	15

== Certifications ==
Certifications and sales for "Tu Recuerdo"
Region	Certification	Certified units/sales
Mexico (AMPROFON) Pre-loaded	4× Platinum	400,000^{*}
Mexico (AMPROFON) Ringtone	Gold	10,000^{*}
Spain (Promusicae) Digital download	4× Platinum	80,000^{^}
Spain (Promusicae) Ringtone	3× Platinum	60,000^{^}
Spain (Promusicae)	Gold	30,000^{‡}
United States Digital download	—	82,000
^{*} Sales figures based on certification alone.^{^} Shipments figures based on certification alone.^{‡} Sales+streaming figures based on certification alone.

== Release history ==
Release dates and formats for "Tu Recuerdo"
Region	Date	Format(s)	Label	Ref.
Russia	October 6, 2006	Contemporary hit radio	Sony BMG	
Spain	November 21, 2006	Digital download	Sony BMG Norte	

== See also ==
- Billboard Hot Latin Songs Year-End Chart
- List of Latin songs on the Billboard Hot 100
- List of number-one Billboard Hot Latin Songs of 2006
- List of number-one Billboard Hot Latin Songs of 2007
- List of number-one Billboard Latin Pop Airplay songs of 2006
- List of number-one Billboard Latin Pop Airplay songs of 2007
