= No Es Lo Mismo Tour =

2004 concert tour by Alejandro Sanz

- World tour by Alejandro Sanz
- Associated album: No Es Lo Mismo
- Start date: February 10, 2004
- End date: September 25, 2004
- Legs: 3
- No. of shows: 28 in Latin America; 28 in Europe; 15 in North America; 71 total

Alejandro Sanz concert chronology
- El Alma Al Aire Tour (2001–02); No Es Lo Mismo Tour (2004); El Tren De Los Momentos Tour (2007–08)

No Es Lo Mismo Tour is a concert tour by Spanish singer Alejandro Sanz as promoting his album No Es Lo Mismo.

== Tour set list ==
1. 12 Por 8
2. Eso
3. Quisiera Ser
4. Cuando Nadie Me Ve
5. La Habana
6. Hoy Llueve, Hoy Duele
7. La Fuerza del Corazón
8. Regálame la Silla Donde Te Esperé
9. He Sido Feliz Contigo
10. Try To Save Your Song
11. Yo Sé lo Que la Gente Piensa
12. ¿Lo Ves?
13. El Alma al Aire
14. Y Sólo Se Me Ocurre Amarte
15. Aprendiz
16. Corazón Partío
17. Medley: Y, ¿Si Fuera Ella?, Amiga Mía, Mi Soledad y Yo
18. No Es lo Mismo

== Tour dates ==
Date	City	Country	Venue
Latin America I
February 10, 2004	Panama City	Panama	Figali Convention Center
February 12, 2004	San Salvador	El Salvador	Estadio Jorge "Mágico" González
February 14, 2004	Guatemala City	Guatemala	Estadio Mateo Flores
February 17, 2004	Caracas	Venezuela	Estadio Universitario UCV
February 19, 2004	Quito	Ecuador	Coliseo General Rumiñahui
February 21, 2004	Bogotá	Colombia	Estadio El Campín
February 24, 2004	San José	Costa Rica	Estadio Ricardo Saprissa
February 26, 2004	Monterrey	Mexico	Auditorio Coca-Cola
February 27, 2004	Monterrey	Mexico	Auditorio Coca-Cola
March 3, 2004	Mexico City	Mexico	National Auditorium
March 4, 2004	Mexico City	Mexico	National Auditorium
March 6, 2004	Mexico City	Mexico	National Auditorium
March 7, 2004	Mexico City	Mexico	National Auditorium
March 10, 2004	Mexico City	Mexico	National Auditorium
March 11, 2004	Mexico City	Mexico	National Auditorium
March 13, 2004	Mexico City	Mexico	National Auditorium
March 14, 2004	Mexico City	Mexico	National Auditorium
March 17, 2004	Guadalajara	Mexico	Estadio Tres de Marzo
March 19, 2004	Mexico City	Mexico	National Auditorium
March 20, 2004	Mexico City	Mexico	National Auditorium
March 23, 2004	São Paulo	Brazil	Credicard Hall
March 25, 2004	Rio de Janeiro	Brazil	Citibank Hall
March 27, 2004	Buenos Aires	Argentina	Estadio Velez
March 31, 2004	Santiago	Chile	Estadio Nacional
April 2, 2004	Lima	Peru	Jockey Club del Perú
April 22, 2004	San Juan	Puerto Rico	Coliseo de Puerto Rico
North America I
April 24, 2004	Miami	United States	American Airlines Arena
April 28, 2004	Washington, D.C.	United States	DAR Constitution Hall
April 30, 2004	Boston	United States	Orpheum Theatre
May 1, 2004	New York City	United States	Madison Square Garden
May 4, 2004	Rosemont	United States	Rosemont Theatre
May 7, 2004	Grand Prairie	United States	Verizon Theatre at Grand Prairie
May 9, 2004	Houston	United States	Reliant Arena
May 12, 2004	Hidalgo	United States	Dodge Arena
May 13, 2004	Laredo	United States	Laredo Entertainment Centre
May 15, 2004	El Paso	United States	El Paso County Coliseum
May 16, 2004	Tucson	United States	Anselmo Valencia Tori Amphitheater
May 18, 2004	Las Vegas	United States	House of Blues
May 20, 2004	San Diego	United States	Cox Arena
May 22, 2004	Anaheim	United States	Arrowhead Pond of Anaheim
May 23, 2004	San Jose	United States	HP Pavilion at San Jose
Latin America II
May 26, 2004	Acapulco	Mexico	Acafest
May 29, 2004	Mexico City	Mexico	Zócalo
Europe I
June 6, 2004	Lisbon	Portugal	Bela Vista Park Rock in Rio Lisbon
June 10, 2004	Las Palmas	Spain	Institución Ferial de Canarias
June 12, 2004	Tenerife	Spain	Recinto ferial
July 30, 2004	A Coruña	Spain	Coliseum da Coruña
August 1, 2004	Cambados	Spain	Estadio de fútbol A Merced
August 3, 2004	Logroño	Spain	Plaza de toros de Logroño
August 5, 2004	Palma	Spain	Lluís Sitjar Stadium
August 7, 2004	Elche	Spain	Estadio Manuel Martínez Valero
August 10, 2004	Roquetas de Mar	Spain	Estadio Municipal Antonio Peroles
August 12, 2004	Málaga	Spain	La Rosaleda Stadium
August 14, 2004	Cádiz	Spain	Estadio Ramón de Carranza
August 17, 2004	Tortosa	Spain	Estadio Municipal de Tortosa
August 19, 2004	Salamanca	Spain	Plaza de toros de Salamanca
August 21, 2004	Albacete	Spain	Plaza de Toros de Albacete
August 24, 2004	Mérida	Spain	Estadio Municipal Mérida
August 26, 2004	Villarreal	Spain	Campos federativos
August 31, 2004	Oviedo	Spain	Complejo Deportivo Municipal San Lázaro
September 2, 2004	Bilbao	Spain	Plaza de Toros de Bilbao
September 4, 2004	Valencia	Spain	Circuito Cheste
September 7, 2004	Barcelona	Spain	Palau Sant Jordi
September 9, 2004	Barcelona	Spain	Palau Sant Jordi
September 11, 2004	Zaragoza	Spain	Príncipe Felipe Arena
September 14, 2004	Madrid	Spain	Plaza de toros de La Ventas
September 16, 2004	Madrid	Spain	Plaza de toros de La Ventas
September 19, 2004	León	Spain	León Arena
September 21, 2004	Granada	Spain	Palacio Municipal de Deportes de Granada
September 23, 2004	Murcia	Spain	Plaza de toros de Murcia
September 25, 2004	Seville	Spain	Estadio Olímpico

=== Box office score data (Billboard) ===
Venue	City	Tickets sold / available	Gross revenue
Auditorio Nacional	Mexico City	88,442 / 96,830 (91%)	$2,933,187
Total		88,442 / 96,830 (91%)	$2,933,187

== Band ==
- Albert Menéndez – Keyboards and Musical Director
- Jeffery Suttles / Nathaniel Townsley – Drums
- Luis Dulzaides – Percussion
- Agustín Gereñu – Bass
- Jose Antonio Rodríguez – Spanish guitar
- Michael Ciro and David Palau – Guitars
- Alfonso Perez - Piano and Backing vocal
- Patxi Urchegui – Trumpet
- Carlos Martin – Trombone
- Jon Robles – Saxophone
- Ester Gonzalez / Txell Sust – Backing vocal
