= María del Mar Rodríguez Carnero =

Spanish singer

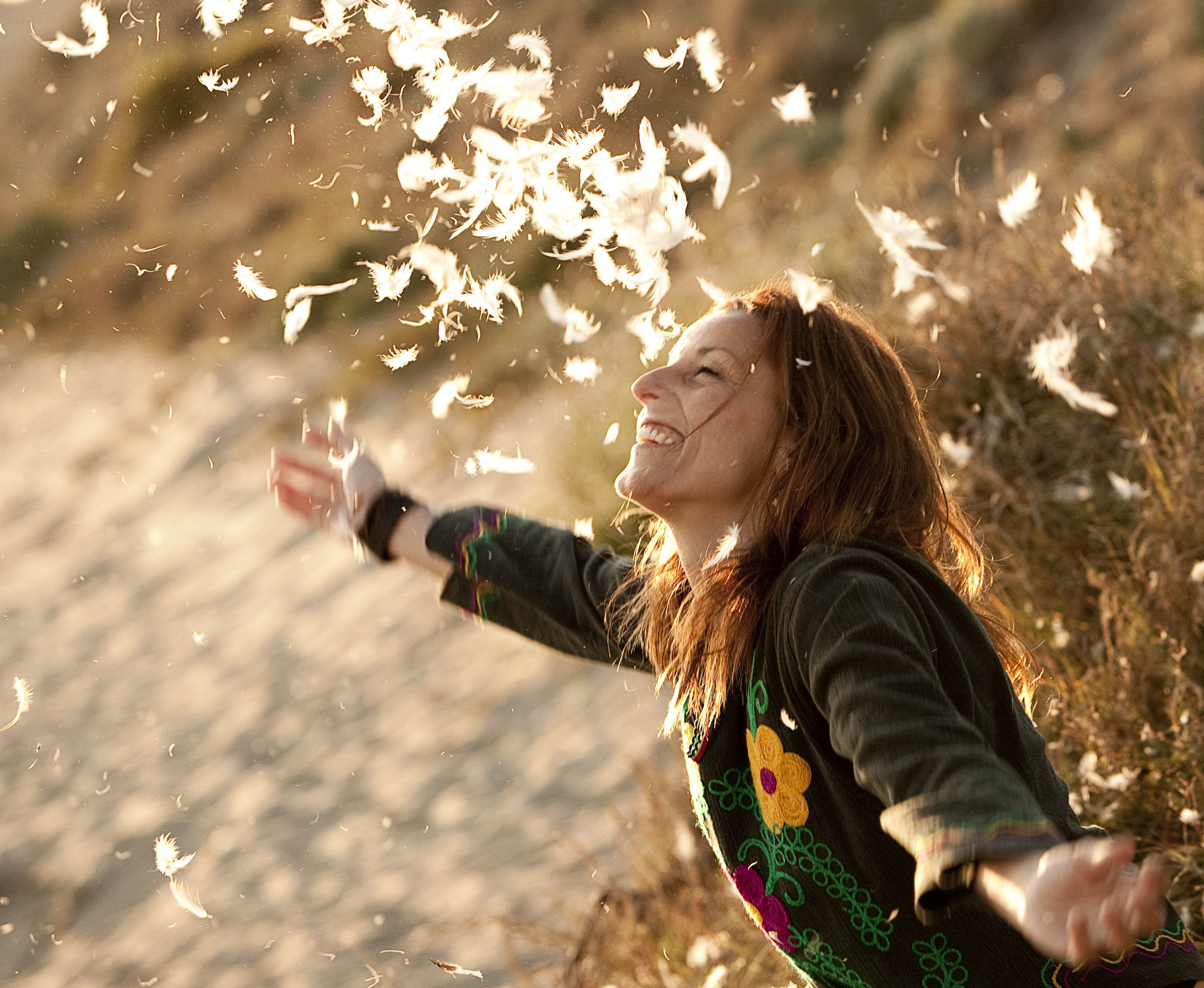
- La Mari

Background information
- Also known as: La Mari, María del Mar Rodríguez
- Born: 18 January 1975 (age 50); Málaga, Andalusia, Spain
- Genres: Flamenco chill, downtempo, worldbeat, Latin
- Occupation: Singer-songwriter
- Instrument: Vocalist
- Years active: 2002–present
- Labels: Sony – Spain
- Website: Chambao.Es

María del Mar Rodríguez Carnero, better known by her stage name La Mari, was born 18 January 1975 in Málaga, Spain and is the lead vocalist of Chambao. One of three original members of the group that formed in 2001, she sang alongside cousins Eduardo Casañ and Daniel Casañ, until Chambao disbanded in 2005. La Mari remained, continuing to front the band and release albums under the name Chambao.

== Life and career ==
In March 2005, La Mari was diagnosed with breast cancer. She co-wrote a book with her sister, Aurora Rodríguez Carnero, discussing her personal experiences overcoming the disease.

In 2006 she was a featuring artist on Ricky Martin's album MTV Unplugged. She featured alongside Ricky Martin on the track "Tu Recuerdo", which hit No. 1 on the Latin Billboard charts and received a Latin Grammy nomination for Record of the Year.

In 2007, La Mari released Con Otro Aire, backed by a new band.

In 2008, she collaborated with the winner of the Eurovision Song Contest 50, Helena Paparizou, performing a duet of her Spanish song, "Papeles Mojados".

In 2009, she received the Medal of Andalusia.

Throughout her career, La Mari has collaborated with various groups and artists, including Ivan Lins, Enrique Morente, Mojo Project, El Bicho, Macaco, Bebe, Estrella Morente, Jarabe de Palo, Javier Ruibal, Cesária Évora, Antonio Orozco, Tabletom, Peret, La Shica, Miguel Rios, Rosario Flores, Lila Downs, Estopa, Calima, La Guardia, Mario Diaz and Ricky Martin.

=== Discography ===
- Flamenco Chill (2002)
- Endorfinas en la Mente (2003)
- Pokito a Poko (2005)
- Con Otro Aire (2007)
- En el Fin del Mundo (2009)
- Chambao (2012)
- Nuevo Ciclo (2016)
- En la Cresta del Ahora (2023)
