= El Tren De Los Momentos Tour =

2007–08 concert tour by Alejandro Sanz

Tour El Tren De Los Momentos
- World tour by Alejandro Sanz
- Associated album: El Tren de los Momentos
- Start date: March 9, 2007
- End date: July 5, 2008
- Legs: 4
- No. of shows: 31 in Latin America; 24 in Europe; 18 in North America; 73 total

Alejandro Sanz concert chronology
- No Es Lo Mismo Tour (2004); Tour El Tren De Los Momentos (2007–2008); Paraiso Tour (2009–2011)

El Tren De Los Momentos Tour is a concert tour by Spanish singer Alejandro Sanz as promoting his album El Tren de los Momentos.

== Tour set list ==
1. El Tren de los Momentos
2. En la Planta de Tus Pies
3. Quisiera Ser
4. Enséñame Tus Manos
5. A la Primera Persona
6. La Peleita
7. Cuando Nadie Me Ve
8. Corazón Partío
9. Donde Convergemos
10. Regálame la Silla Donde Te Esperé
11. Se lo Dices Tú
12. Labana
13. Y, ¿Si Fuera Ella? – Mi Soledad y Yo – La Fuerza del Corazón – Amiga Mía
14. El Alma al Aire
15. Try To Save Your Song
16. Yo Sé lo Que la Gente Piensa
17. ¿Lo Ves?
18. Te lo Agradezco, Pero No
19. No Es lo Mismo

== Tour dates ==
Date	City	Country	Venue
Latin America I
March 9, 2007	Lima	Peru	Explanada Estadio Monumental
March 10, 2007	Lima	Peru	Explanada Estadio Monumental
March 14, 2007	Antofagasta	Chile	Estadio Regional de Antofagasta
March 17, 2007	Santiago	Chile	Estadio Nacional
March 19, 2007	Córdoba	Argentina	Orfeo Superdomo
March 21, 2007	Rosario	Argentina	Estadio Rosario Central
March 23, 2007	Buenos Aires	Argentina	Estadio River Plate
April 18, 2007	Mexico City	Mexico	National Auditorium
April 19, 2007	Mexico City	Mexico	National Auditorium
April 21, 2007	Mexico City	Mexico	National Auditorium
April 22, 2007	Mexico City	Mexico	National Auditorium
April 25, 2007	Mexico City	Mexico	National Auditorium
April 26, 2007	Mexico City	Mexico	National Auditorium
April 28, 2007	Mexico City	Mexico	National Auditorium
April 29, 2007	Mexico City	Mexico	National Auditorium
May 4, 2007	León	Mexico	Poliforum León
May 6, 2007	Guadalajara	Mexico	Arena VFG
May 9, 2007	Monterrey	Mexico	Auditorio Coca-Cola
May 11, 2007	Monterrey	Mexico	Auditorio Coca-Cola
May 12, 2007	Monterrey	Mexico	Auditorio Coca-Cola
Europe I
August 4, 2007	Santiago de Compostela	Spain	Pavillón Multiusos Fontes do Sar
August 7, 2007	Girona	Spain	Ciudadela de Rosas
August 9, 2007	Málaga	Spain	La Rosaleda Stadium
August 11, 2007	Cádiz	Spain	La Mina
August 16, 2007	Valencia	Spain	Estadio de fútbol La Murta
August 18, 2007	Alicante	Spain	Plaza de toros de Alicante
August 20, 2007	Palma de Mallorca	Spain	Plaza de toros de Mallorca
August 23, 2007	A Coruña	Spain	Coliseum da Coruña
August 25, 2007	Ciudad Real	Spain	Polideportivo Rey Juan Carlos
August 28, 2007	Jaén	Spain	Estadio Linarejos
September 1, 2007	Salamanca	Spain	Plaza de toros de Salamanca
September 2, 2007	San Sebastián	Spain	Velódromo de Anoeta
September 4, 2007	Barcelona	Spain	Palau Sant Jordi
September 7, 2007	Andorra la Vella	Andorra	Estadi Comunal d'Andorra la Vella
September 9, 2007	León	Spain	Auditorio Municipal Ponferrada
September 12, 2007	Madrid	Spain	Plaza de toros de las Ventas
September 15, 2007	Valencia	Spain	Plaza de Toros de Valencia
September 19, 2007	Pamplona	Spain	Plaza de Toros de Pamplona
September 22, 2007	Oviedo	Spain	Pista de Atletismo de San Lázaro
September 25, 2007	Granada	Spain	Palacio Municipal de Deportes de Granada
September 27, 2007	Murcia	Spain	Plaza de toros de Murcia
September 29, 2007	Seville	Spain	Estadio de La Cartuja
Latin America II
October 21, 2007	San Juan	Puerto Rico	Coliseo de Puerto Rico
October 24, 2007	Guatemala City	Guatemala	Forum Mundo E
October 26, 2007	San Salvador	El Salvador	Estadio Jorge "Mágico" González
October 30, 2007	Panama City	Panama	Figali Convention Center
November 1, 2007	Managua	Nicaragua	Estadio Olímpico INJUDE
November 7, 2007	Cali	Colombia	Plaza de toros de Cali
November 8, 2007	Bogotá	Colombia	Coliseo Cubierto el Campín
November 10, 2007	Quito	Ecuador	Estadio Olímpico Atahualpa
November 13, 2007	Lima	Peru	Estadio Nacional (Voces Solidarias)
North America I
November 16, 2007	Los Angeles	United States	Gibson Amphitheatre
November 17, 2007	Los Angeles	United States	Gibson Amphitheatre
November 20, 2007	Las Vegas	United States	The Pearl at the Palms Hotel & Casino
November 21, 2007	San Diego	United States	Cox Arena
November 23, 2007	El Paso	United States	El Paso County Coliseum
November 25, 2007	Phoenix	United States	US Airways Center
November 27, 2007	Hidalgo	United States	Dodge Arena
November 29, 2007	Houston	United States	Verizon Wireless Theater
November 30, 2007	Grand Prairie	United States	Nokia Theatre at Grand Prairie
December 2, 2007	Orlando	United States	Bob Carr Performing Arts Centre
December 5, 2007	Laredo	United States	Laredo Entertainment Centre
December 8, 2007	Miami	United States	American Airlines Arena
January 25, 2008	New York City	United States	The Theatre at Madison Square Garden
January 27, 2008	Boston	United States	Orpheum Theatre
January 30, 2008	Washington, D.C.	United States	DAR Constitution Hall
February 1, 2008	Duluth	United States	Gwinnett Arena
February 3, 2008	Rosemont	United States	Rosemont Theatre
February 6, 2008	Tampa	United States	Tampa Bay Performing Arts Center
Latin America III
February 9, 2008	Santo Domingo	Dominican Republic	Palacio de los deportes
February 12, 2008	San José	Costa Rica	Estadio Ricardo Saprissa Aymá
Europe II
May 31, 2008	Lisbon	Portugal	Bela Vista Park Rock in Rio Lisbon 2008
July 5, 2008	Madrid	Spain	Arganda del Rey Rock in Rio Madrid 2008

=== Box office score data (Billboard) ===
Venue	City	Tickets sold / available	Gross revenue
Auditorio Nacional	México City	61,920 / 76,677 (81%)	$2,804,005
Poliforum León	León	7,414 / 8,500 (87%)	$373,763
Arena VFG	Guadalajara	9,595 / 9,605 (99%)	$470,975
Auditorio Coca-Cola	Monterrey	18,923 / 25,324 (75%)	$1,216,311
US Airways Center	Phoenix	1,678 / 4,835 (35%)	$119,292
Bela Vista Park, Rock In Rio Festival	Lisbon	48,831 / 48,831 (100%)	$3,993,759
Total		148,361 / 173,772 (85%)	$8,978,105

== Cancellations and rescheduled ==
The Montevideo show (March 25, 2007) was cancelled and not rescheduled. The Managua show (October 28, 2007) was rescheduled to November 1, 2007. The Caracas show (February 14, 2008) was cancelled.

== Band ==
- Michael Cirincione – Musical Director and Guitar
- Alfonso Perez – Keyboards, Guitar and Backing vocal
- Luis Dulzaides – Percussion
- Carlos Martin – Trombon, Keyboards and Percussion
- Steve Rodriguez – Bass
- Selan Lemer – Keyboards and Backing vocal
- Nathaniel Townsley – Drums
- Christopher Hierro – Keyboards and backing vocal
- Meritxell Sust – Backing vocal
- Sara Devine – Backing vocal
- Javier Vercher – Trombone
- Luis Aquino – Trumpet
