= A la Primera Persona =

Single by Alejandro Sanz

from the album El Tren de los Momentos
- Released: 25 September 2006
- Recorded: 2004–2006
- Genre: Latin pop
- Length: 4:43 (Radio edit); 5:02 (Album version)
- Songwriter: Alejandro Sanz

Alejandro Sanz singles chronology
"La Tortura" (2005)	"A la Primera Persona" (2006)	"Te Lo Agradezco, Pero No" (2006)

"A la Primera Persona" (English: To the First Person) is a love song recorded by the Spanish singer-songwriter Alejandro Sanz. It was released as the first single from his album El Tren de los Momentos (2006). The song reached the number-one spot on the Billboard Hot Latin Tracks and Latin Pop Airplay charts.

== Music video ==
The music video of the song starts with a scene in which a train is seen passing during sunrise. Then, Alejandro is seen walking alone on the street. He then picks up a newspaper from a garbage can and starts to read it. He continues to walk and suddenly sees some objects lying in the middle of the street. He picks up a guitar, which is also thrown there. It is then revealed that he owns the objects, and that his girlfriend was the one who threw them there after an argument with him.

== Chart performance ==
Chart (2006)	Peak position
US Billboard Hot 100	100
US Hot Latin Songs (Billboard)	1
US Latin Pop Airplay (Billboard)	1
