= El Tren de los Momentos =

Studio album by Alejandro Sanz
- Released: 7 November 2006
- Recorded: 2004–2006
- Studios: Abdala Studios (Havana, Cuba); El Coraje Estudio (Miami, Florida); La Marimonda Studios (Nassau, Bahamas); PKO Studios (Madrid, Spain)
- Genre: Latin pop
- Length: 40:11
- Label: WEA Latina
- Producer: Lulo Pérez · Alejandro Sanz

Alejandro Sanz chronology
Grandes Éxitos 1991–2004 (2004)	El Tren de los Momentos (2006)	El Tren de los Momentos: En Vivo Desde Buenos Aires (2007)

Singles from El Tren de los Momentos
- 1. "A la Primera Persona" Released: September 25, 2006; 2. "Te Lo Agradezco, Pero No" Released: December 11, 2006; 3. "Enséñame Tus Manos" Released: April 16, 2007; 4. "En la Planta de Tus Pies" Released: August 13, 2007

Professional ratings
Review scores
Source	Rating
Allmusic	5/5 stars

El Tren de los Momentos (The Train of the Moments) is the eighth studio album recorded by Spanish singer-songwriter Alejandro Sanz, It was released by WEA Latina on November 7, 2006 (see 2006 in music) and includes collaborations with Juanes, Antonio Carmona (ex-Ketama), Shakira and Calle 13. It contains ten songs produced by him and Lulo Pérez and this diversity of voices allows approaching social, political and faith topics from differing points of view.

It was recorded in Havana, Miami, Bahamas and Madrid, with most recording taking place in a studio that Sanz has at his house in Miami.

The album won the Grammy Award for Best Latin Pop Album at the 50th Annual Grammy Awards. Also was nominated for a Latin Grammy Award for Album of the Year, at the 8th Annual Latin Grammy Awards which was awarded to La Llave de Mi Corazón by Juan Luis Guerra.

== Track listing ==
All songs written by Alejandro Sanz, except where noted.

1. Enséñame Tus Manos – 3:51
2. A la Primera Persona – 5:02
3. Te lo Agradezco, Pero No (featuring Shakira) – 4:33
4. Donde Convergemos – 4:56
5. En la Planta de Tus Pies – 3:57
6. La Peleita (René Pérez, Alejandro Sanz) – 4:45
7. Se lo Dices Tú – 3:49
8. Se Molestan – 3:06
9. Te Quiero y Te Temo – 3:12
10. El Tren de los Momentos – 3:00

== Personnel ==
- Arranger, Art Direction, Audio Engineer, Audio Production, Composer, Coros, Didjeridu, Acoustic Guitar, Electric Guitar, Loops, Main Personnel, Primary Artist, Producer, Recording, Soloist, Spanish Guitar, Vocals - Alejandro Sanz
- Guest Artist - Alex Gonzalez
- Production Assistant - Alexei Moises Sanchez Mesa
- Cajon - Antonio Carmona
- Tenor Saxophone, Saxophone - Ariel Bringuez
- Bajo Sexto - Armando Gola
- Coros - Beth Cohan
- Guest Artist - Calle 13
- Production Assistant - Carlos Francisco Hernandez
- Acoustic Guitar, Electric Guitar, Soloist - Dan Warner
- Percussion - Fernando Favier
- Production Assistant - Gonzalo Perez
- Recording - Gustavo Celis
- EWI - Hamadi Bayard
- Production Assistant - James Roach
- Art Direction, Graphic Conception, Photography - Jaume DeLaiguana
- Trombone - Jorge Dobal
- Guest Artist - Juanes
- Bateria - Lee Levin
- Percussion - Luis Dulzaides
- Arranger, Coros, Fender Rhodes, Electric Guitar, Keyboards, Loops, Hammond Organ, Percussion, Piano, Producer, Recording, Timbales, Trumpet - Lulo Perez
- Electric Guitar - Michael Ciro
- Bateria - Nomar Negroni
- Recording - Pepo Scherman
- Mixing, Recording - Rafa Sardina
- Arranger, Trumpet - Roberto Perez
- Guest Artist - Shakira
- Mastering - Stephen Marcussen
- Digital Editing - Stewart Whitmore
- Congas - Tata Guinness
- Audio Engineer, Audio Production, Mixing - Thom Russo

== Chart performance ==
=== Album ===
Year	Chart	Peak	Weeks on chart
2006	Billboard Latin Pop Albums	2	24
2006	Billboard Top Latin Albums	3	25
2006	Billboard 200	66	2
2007	Colombia Top 100 Albums	1	
2007	Billboard European Top 100 Albums	53	5

=== Singles ===
Year	Chart	Track	Peak	Weeks on chart
2006	Billboard Bubbling Under Hot 100 Singles	A la Primera Persona	11	1
2006	Billboard Hot 100 Airplay	A la Primera Persona	64	1
2006	Billboard Hot Latin Songs	A la Primera Persona	1	20
2006	Billboard Latin Pop Airplay	A la Primera Persona	1	20
2006	Billboard Latin Regional Mexican Airplay	A la Primera Persona	5	1
2006	Billboard Latin Tropical Airplay	A la Primera Persona	8	8
2006	Billboard Hot 100	A la Primera Persona	100	1
2007	Billboard Bubbling Under Hot 100 Singles	Te Lo Agradezco, Pero No	24	1
2007	Billboard Hot 100 Airplay	Te Lo Agradezco, Pero No	72	1
2007	Billboard Hot Latin Songs	Te Lo Agradezco, Pero No	1	17
2007	Billboard Latin Pop Airplay	Te Lo Agradezco, Pero No	1	22
2007	Billboard Latin Rhythm Airplay	Te Lo Agradezco, Pero No	28	10
2007	Billboard Latin Tropical Airplay	Te Lo Agradezco, Pero No	4	5
2007	Billboard Latin Pop Airplay	Enséñame Tus Manos	29	7

Date	Chart	Track	Peak
February 24, 2007	Los40.com Los 40 Principales	Te Lo Agradezco, Pero No	1

== Sales and certifications ==
Region	Certification	Certified units/sales
Argentina (CAPIF)	Platinum	40,000^{^}
Mexico (AMPROFON)	Platinum+Gold	150,000^{^}
Spain (Promusicae)	4× Platinum	320,000^{^}
United States (RIAA)	Platinum (Latin)	100,000^{^}
^{^} Shipments figures based on certification alone.

== Special edition ==
El Tren de los Momentos: Edición Especial

Studio album by Alejandro Sanz
- Released: May 22, 2007
- Recorded: 2004–2006 at Abdala Studios (Havana, Cuba); El Coraje Estudio (Miami, Florida); La Marimonda Studios (Nassau, Bahamas); PKO Studios (Madrid, Spain)
- Genre: Latin pop
- Label: WEA Latina

El Tren de los Momentos: Edición Especial is the 2007 re-release of the album El Tren de los Momentos containing two CDs and one DVD. The CD 1 is the same as the original album, the CD 2 contains four previously unreleased tracks (including "No Lo Digo por Nada" with Alex González of Maná on the drums) and three remixes; the DVD includes music videos.

== Track listing ==
=== CD (El Tren de los Momentos) ===
1. Enséñame Tus Manos – 3:51
2. A la Primera Persona – 4:43
3. Te Lo Agradezco, Pero No – 4:33
4. Donde Convergemos – 4:56
5. En la Planta de Tus Pies – 3:57
6. La Peleíta (René Pérez, Alejandro Sanz) – 4:45
7. Se Lo Dices Tú – 3:49
8. Se Molestan – 3:06
9. Te Quiero y Te Temo – 3:12
10. El Tren de los Momentos – 3:00

=== CD (Más canciones y remezclas) ===
1. Cariño a Mares – 4:46
2. Tiento – 4:22
3. No Lo Digo por Nada – 4:30
4. No Importa – 4:17
5. A la Primera Persona Chosen Few Remix (Remixed by Boy Wonder and Now & Laterz featuring Reychesta Secret Weapon) – 4:19
6. Te Lo Agradezco, Pero No (Luny Tunes and Tainy Remix) – 3:09
7. Te Lo Agradezco, Pero No (Benztown Mixdown) – 4:30

=== DVD (Todas las imágenes) ===
1. A la Primera Persona (Video)
2. A la Primera Persona (Making Of)
3. Te Lo Agradezco, Pero No (Video)
4. Te Lo Agradezco, Pero No (Making Of)
5. El Tren de los Momentos (Cómo se grabó)
6. "Alejandro en Corto" Especial de Cuatro TV

== Track listing (Mexican re-edition) ==
=== CD (El Tren de los Momentos) ===
1. Enséñame Tus Manos – 3:51
2. A la Primera Persona – 4:43
3. Te Lo Agradezco, Pero No – 4:33
4. Donde Convergemos – 4:56
5. En la Planta de Tus Pies – 3:57
6. La Peleíta (René Pérez, Alejandro Sanz) – 4:45
7. Se Lo Dices Tú – 3:49
8. Se Molestan – 3:06
9. Te Quiero y Te Temo – 3:12
10. El Tren de los Momentos – 3:00
11. No Lo Digo por Nada – 4:30
12. Cariño a Mares – 4:46
13. A la Primera Persona Chosen Few Remix (Remixed by Boy Wonder and Now & Laterz featuring Reychesta Secret Weapon) – 4:19
14. Te Lo Agradezco, Pero No (Luny Tunes and Tainy Remix) – 3:09

=== DVD (Todas Las Imágenes) ===
1. "Alejandro en Corto" Especial de Cuatro TV
2. Galería de fotos
