= El Tren de los Momentos: En Vivo Desde Buenos Aires =

Live album by Alejandro Sanz
- Released: October 30, 2007
- Recorded: River Plate Stadium; Buenos Aires, Argentina (March 23, 2007)
- Genre: Latin pop
- Length: 60:41
- Label: WEA Latina

Alejandro Sanz chronology
El Tren de los Momentos (2006)	El Tren de los Momentos: En Vivo Desde Buenos Aires (2007)	Paraíso Express (2009)

Professional ratings
Review scores
Source	Rating
Allmusic	4/5 stars

El Tren De Los Momentos: En Vivo Desde Buenos Aires is the third live album by the Spanish singer-songwriter Alejandro Sanz. It was recorded during the concert offered in front of 45,000 people in the River Plate Stadium on March 23, 2007. The album, released in digipack format, contains a CD with a selection of 10 tracks of the concert and a DVD of two hours.

== Track listing ==
=== CD ===
1. En la Planta de Tus Pies – 5:23
2. Quisiera Ser – 5:42
3. Enséñame Tus Manos – 4:45
4. La Peleita (René Pérez, Alejandro Sanz) – 8:45
5. Corazón Partío – 6:57
6. Donde Convergemos – 6:38
7. Se lo Dices Tú – 3:50
8. El Alma al Aire – 5:48
9. No es lo Mismo – 7:30
10. Te lo Agradezco, Pero No con Shakira desde Santiago de Compostela Bonus Track – 5:23

=== DVD ===
1. El Tren de los Momentos
2. En la Planta de Tus Pies
3. Quisiera Ser
4. Enséñame Tus Manos
5. A la Primera Persona
6. La Peleita
7. Cuando Nadie Me Ve
8. Corazón Partío
9. Donde Convergemos
10. Regálame la Silla Donde Te Esperé
11. Se lo Dices Tú
12. Labana
13. Medley (Mi Soledad y Yo, La Fuerza del Corazón, Amiga Mía, ¿Y, Si Fuera Ella?)
14. El Alma al Aire
15. Try To Save Your Song
16. ¿Lo Ves?
17. Te lo Agradezco, Pero No
18. No es lo Mismo
19. Te lo Agradezco, Pero No con Shakira desde Santiago de Compostela Bonus Track

== Personnel ==
- Luis Aquino – Trumpet
- Mike Ciro – Director, electric guitar
- Sarah Devine – Background vocals
- Fernando Díaz – Engineer, mixing
- Claudio Divella – Photography
- Luis Dulzaides – Percussion
- Juan Carlos "Diez Pianos" García – Technician
- Selan Lerner – Background vocals, keyboards
- Carlos Martin – Keyboards, percussion, trombone, trumpet
- Alfonso Pérez – Background vocals, electric guitar, keyboards
- Steve Rodríguez – Bass
- Alejandro Sanz – Vocals
- Nathaniel Townsley – Drums
- Javier Vercher – Flute, saxophone
