= Nuclear (band) =

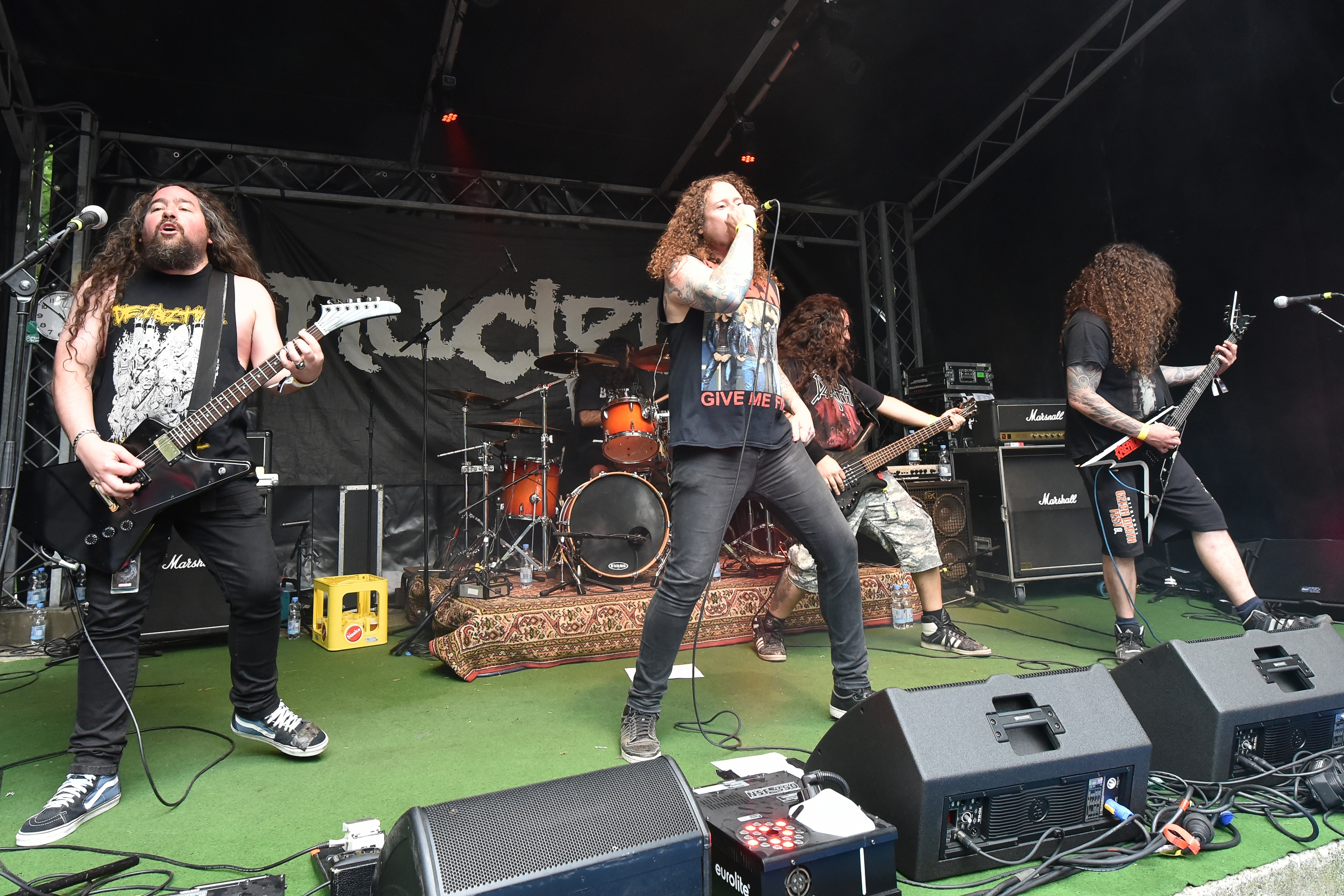
- Nuclear at Rage Against Racism 2017 in Duisburg

Background information
- Also known as: Escoria (1998–2001)
- Origin: Arica, Chile
- Genre: Thrash metal
- Years active: 1995–2001; 2003–present
- Label: Candlelight Records
- Members: Matías Leonicio; Francisco Haussmann; Sebastian Puente; Eugenio Sudy; Roberto Soto
- Website: nuclear.cl

Nuclear is a Chilean thrash metal band founded in Arica in 1998. The band has gone through several lineup changes and is signed to Candlelight Records.

== History ==
Nuclear was formed in 1995 as Escoria. They released their first recording in 1997. After dissolving in 2001, they changed their name to Nuclear. Original members Sebastian Puente, Francisco, and Eugene Haussmann Sudy remain in the lineup.

The band has released four studio albums and toured several countries, sharing stages with Testament, Forbidden, Voivod, Grave, Hirax, 1349, Anthrax, Destruction, Witchcraft, Hate Eternal, Absu, At the Gates, among others.

During 2013, the band released their first live DVD called Sick Mosh and Inner Hate, a split vinyl, which were put in launching and distributed by the Chilean label Sick Bangers.

Tour and constant releases of the band caught the attention of British label Candlelight Records, and in 2014 signed the band for future releases. And on 15 June 2015 the band released their fifth studio album entitled Formula for Anarchy.

== Band members ==
=== Current members ===
- Matías Leonicio – lead vocalist
- Francisco Haussmann – guitar
- Sebastian Puente – guitar
- Eugenio Sudy – drum
- Roberto Soto – bass

=== Former members ===
- Raimundo Correa – bass
- Álvaro Castillo – bass

== Discography ==
=== Studio albums ===
- Heaven Denied (2006)
- Ten Broken Codes (2008)
- Jehovirus (2010)
- Formula for Anarchy (2015)
- Murder of Crows (2020)

=== EPs ===
- Apatrida (2012)
- Violent DNA (2024)

=== Live albums ===
- Mosh Detonation (2009)
- Live at Teatro Novedades (2012)
- Live at Obscene Extreme Bootleg (2014)
- XVII SWR Barroselas Live Bootleg (2014)

=== Demo ===
- Promo Tape (1997)
- Demo (1998)

=== DVD ===
- Chilean Most Wanted (2008)
- Sick Mosh (2014)
