= Chambao =

Spanish flamenco-electronic band

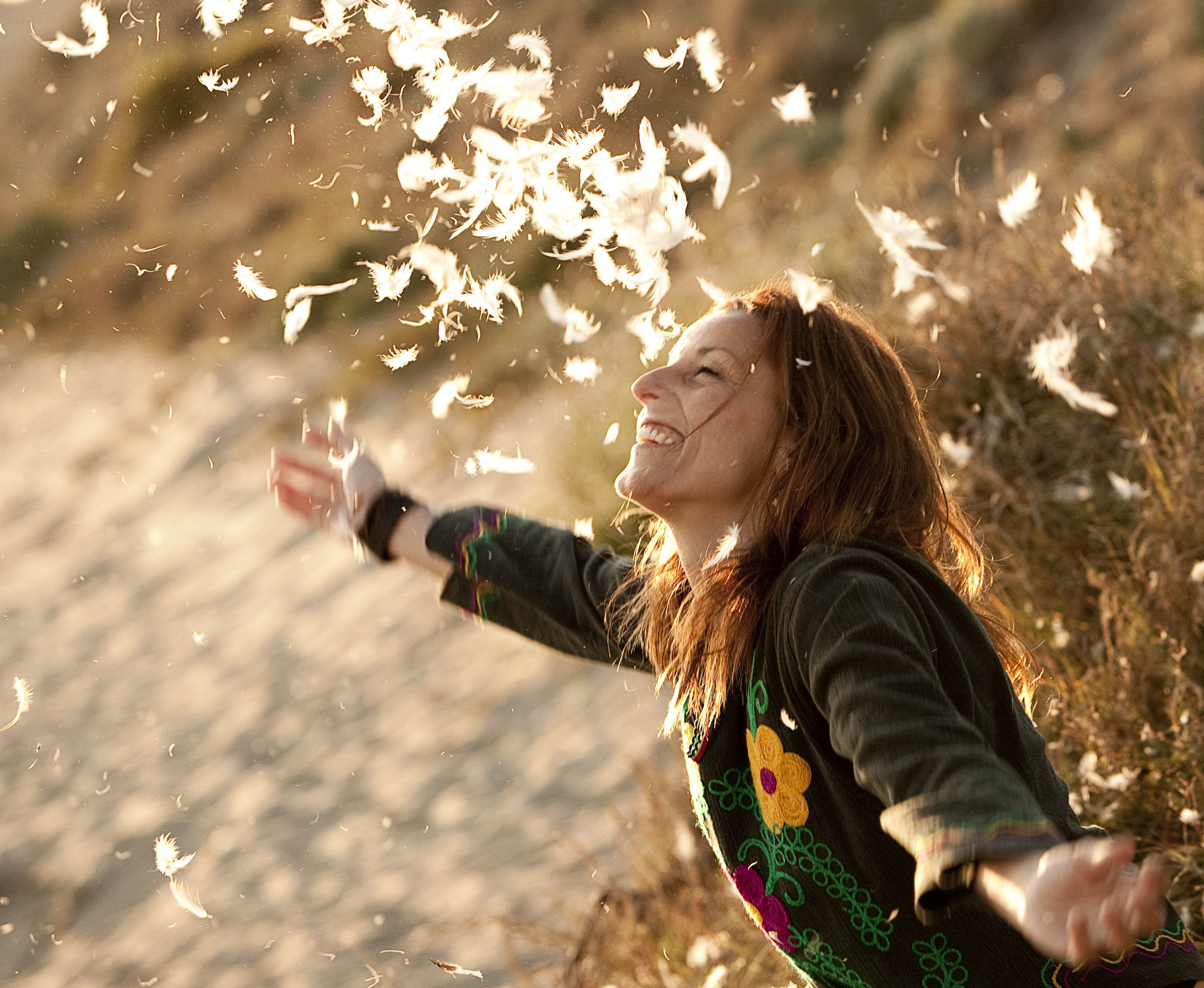
María del Mar Rodriguez Carnero of Chambao

Chambao is a flamenco-electronic band originally from Málaga, Andalusia, Spain, active in its first period from 2002 to 2018 and with a return announced for 2023. Their music fuses flamenco sounds and musical forms with electronic music. The name of the band is taken from an improvised form of beach tent that is constructed as a means of sheltering from the wind and sun.

The three original members of Chambao were María del Mar Rodriguez Carnero (La Mari), Eduardo Casañ (El Edi) and Daniel Casañ (Dani). Their brand of flamenco, described as flamenco chill, combined the vocal style of traditional Andalusian flamenco with elements of chillout electronica. Formed in 2001 in Malaga, Spain, Chambao first appeared to the greater public on the 2002 Sony compilation Flamenco Chill, to which they contributed eight songs. Two years later, their first solo full-length, Endorfinas en la Mente, produced by Bob Benozzo, was released, followed the next year by Pokito a Poko.

Dani left the group before Pokito a Poko was finished. After touring in support of the album, Edi also left the band, leaving Mari as the last remaining member. After undergoing successful treatment for breast cancer, she returned to the stage and studio with Chambao, this time with a new seven-piece backing band. In 2007 the band released their fourth studio album, Con Otro Aire. Chambao returned five years later with their self-titled fifth release.

== Discography ==
- Flamenco Chill (2002)
- Endorfinas en la Mente (2003)
- Pokito a Poko (2005)
- Con Otro Aire (2007)
- En el Fin del Mundo (2009)
- Chambao (2012)
- 10 Años Around The World (2013)
- Nuevo Ciclo (2016)
- En la Cresta del Ahora (2023)
