= List of awards and nominations received by Maná =

List of the awards won by Mexican pop/rock band Maná.

== Billboard Latin Music Awards ==
- 2000: Spirit of Hope
- 2003: Latin Rock Album of the Year: Revolución de Amor
- 2003: Latin Pop Album of the Year, Duo or Group: Revolución de Amor
- 2007: Latin Pop Airplay Song of the Year, Duo or Group: Labios Compartidos
- 2007: Latin Rock/Alternative Album of the Year: Amar es Combatir
- 2008: Latin Tour Of The Year: Amar es Combatir Tour
- 2009: Hot Latin Song of the Year Duo or Group: "Si No Te Hubieras Ido"
- 2009: Latin Pop Airplay Song of the Year, Duo or Group: "Si No Te Hubieras Ido"
- 2009: Latin Pop Album of the Year Duo or Group: Arde El Cielo
- 2009: Latin Rock/Alternative Album Of The Year: Arde El Cielo
- 2012: Latin Duet Or Group, Songs: Maná
- 2012: Latin Duet Or Group, Album: Maná
- 2012: Latin Pop Duet Or Group of The Year, Songs: Maná
- 2012: Latin Pop Album Of The Year: Drama y Luz
- 2012: Latin Pop Duet Or Group of Year, Album: Maná
- 2013: Spirit of Hope
- 2016: Latin Pop Duet Or Group of Year, Album: Maná
- 2016: Latin Pop Song of the Year: Mi Verdad
- 2016: Latin Pop Songs Artist of the Year: Maná
- 2016: Latin Pop Albums Artist of the Year: Maná
- 2018: Lifetime Achievement Award: Maná
- 2021: Icon Award: Maná
- 2022: Latin Pop Duo/Group of the Year: Maná

== Grammy Awards ==
- 1999: Best Latin Rock/Alternative Performance for "Sueños Líquidos"
- 2003: Best Latin Rock/Alternative Album for "Revolución de Amor"
- 2007: Best Latin Rock/Alternative Album for "Amar es Combatir"
- 2012: Best Latin Pop, Rock or Urban Album for "Drama y Luz"

== Latin Grammy Awards ==
- 2000: Record of the Year for "Corazón Espinado" (with Santana)
- 2000: Best Pop Performance by a Duo or Group with Vocal for "Se Me Olvidó Otra Vez"
- 2000: Best Rock Performance by a Duo or Group for "Corazón Espinado" (with Santana)
- 2003: Best Rock Album by a Duo or Group for "Revolución de Amor"
- 2006: Special Award for musical accomplishments
- 2011: Best Rock Album for "Drama y Luz"
- 2011: Best Engineered Album for "Drama y Luz"
- 2015: Best Rock/Pop Album for "Cama Incendiada"
- 2018: Person of the Year

== Los Premios 40 Principales ==
- 2007: Best Concert/Tour Amar es Combatir Tour
- 2011: Best Concert/Tour Drama y Luz World Tour

== Los Premios Telehit ==
- Los Premios Telehit 2011: Best Mexican Band International

== MTV Video Music Awards Latin America ==
- 2006: Best Music Video for "Labios Compartidos"
- 2006: Best Rock Artist
- 2006: Lifetime Achievement Award
- 2007: Best Group or Duet
- 2007: Artist of the Year

== Orgullosamente Latino ==
- 2007: Best Latino Video Award "Bendita Tu Luz" with Juan Luis Guerra

== Premios Cadena Dial ==
- 2011: Premio Cadena Dial

== Premios Casandra ==
- 2012: Premio Casandra Internacional

== Premios People En Español Awards ==
- 2011: Best Album: Drama y Luz
- 2011: Best Rock Artist or Group

== Premios Juventud ==
- 2006: Supernova Award
- 2007: Favorite Rock Artist
- 2008: Favorite Rock Artist
- 2009: Favorite Rock Artist
- 2011: Favorite Rock Artist
- 2012: Favorite Rock Artist

== Premio Lo Nuestro ==
- 1997: Pop Best Group
- 1999: Pop Best Group
- 1999: Pop Album of the Year Sueños Líquidos ( Along with Shakira album ¿Dónde Están los Ladrones? )
- 2000: Pop Best Group
- 2003: Rock Album of the Year Revolución de Amor
- 2004: Pop Song of the Year "Mariposa Traicionera"
- 2005: Rock Album of the Year Essentiales: Luna
- 2007: Rock Artist of the Year
- 2007: Rock Album of the Year Amar es Combatir
- 2007: Rock Song of the Year "Labios Compartidos"
- 2008: Rock Artist of the Year
- 2008: Rock Song of the Year "Bendita Tu Luz" with Juan Luis Guerra
- 2011: Excellence Award
- 2012: Rock/Alternative Album of the Year Drama y Luz
- 2012: Rock/Alternative Artist of the Year

== Premios Oye! ==
- 2002: Special Prizes: Social Prize to Music
- 2003: Album of the Year Revolución de Amor
- 2003: Best Solo or Group Artist
- 2004: Mexican Public Commercial Award
- 2007: MasterTone "Labios Compartidos"

== Ritmo Latino Music Awards ==
- 1999: Best Solo or Rock Group Artist
- 2000: Album of the Year Maná MTV Unplugged
- 2003: Album of the Year Revolución de Amor

== World Music Awards ==
- 2007: World's Best-Selling Latin Group
- 2007: Best Selling Latin American Artist
