= Drama y Luz World Tour =

2011–14 concert tour by Maná

- World tour by Maná
- Associated album: Drama y Luz
- Start date: June 16, 2011 (to date)
- End date: February 2014
- Legs: 15 (to date)
- No. of shows: 6 in the Caribbean; 42 in North America; 12 in Europe; 17 in Mexico; 8 in Central America; 21 in South America; 105 total 0 Cancelled; 22 Countries

Maná concert chronology
- Amar es Combatir Tour 2007–2008; Drama y Luz Tour 2011–2014; Cama Incendiada Tour 2015–2016

The Drama y Luz World Tour is the seventh concert tour by Mexican pop rock band Maná. The tour is in support of their eighth studio album Drama y Luz. The tour began with three concerts in Puerto Rico, following with dates in North America and Spain.

== Background ==
On April 13, 2011 before the tour was announced, the band confirmed that they will be performing at the Rock in Rio Madrid festival in Madrid, Spain in 2012. The tour was then announced on April 18, 2011 on their Facebook page and their official website, with the first shows taking place in Puerto Rico. Due to overwhelming demand, more dates were announced for San Juan, Los Angeles, Houston and Rosemont. On May 6, 2011 on their Facebook page they confirmed the first two dates for the European tour, which is currently expected to visit Spain. This will be the first time the band begins a world tour in Puerto Rico. Maná will be performing their newest hits as well as songs from their previous albums.

== Setlist ==
Puerto Rico – Opening Night
1. "Lluvia al Corazón"
2. "Oye Mi Amor"
3. "Manda Una Señal"
4. "Eres Mi Religión"
5. "Amor Clandestino
6. "Rayando El Sol"
7. "El Espejo"
8. "Sor Maria"
9. "Vuela Libre Paloma"
10. "Bendita Tu Luz"
11. "Mariposa Traicionera"
12. "Latinoamerica"
13. "Corazón Espinado"
14. "Me Vale"
15. Unplugged – "¿Dónde Jugarán los Niños?", "Se Me Olvidó Otra Vez", "Ojalá Pudiera Borrarte" & "Te Lloré Un Rió", "Si No Te Hubieras Ido" & "Vivir Sin Aire"
16. Alex Solo
17. "Como Te Deseo"
18. "De Pies A Cabeza"
19. "Dejame Entrar"
20. "Clavado En Un Bar"
- Encores
1. "Labios Compartidos"
2. "En El Muelle De San Blás"
Rock in Rio 2011 (Rio de Janeiro, Brasil)
1. "Lluvia al Corazón"
2. "Oye Mi Amor"
3. "Eres Mi Religión"
4. "Labios Compartidos"
5. "Latinoamerica"
6. "Corazón Espinado"
7. "Rayando El Sol"
8. "Vivir Sin Aire"
9. "En El Muelle De San Blas"
10. "Clavado En Un Bar"
South America 2012
1. "Lluvia al Corazón"
2. "Dejame Entrar"
3. "De Pies A Cabeza"
4. "El Espejo"
5. "El Verdadero Amor Perdona"
6. "Vuela Libre Paloma"
7. "Amor Clandestino"
8. "Mariposa Traicionera"
9. "Corazón Espinado"
10. "Latinoamerica"
11. "Me Vale"
12. Alex Solo
13. "Bendita Tu Luz"
14. Unplugged – "Eres Mi Religión", "Te Lloré Un Rió", "Vivir Sin Aire", "Si No Te Hubieras Ido" & " El Rey"
15. "Clavado En Un Bar"
16. "En El Muelle De San Blas"
- Encores
1. "Rayando El Sol"
2. "Manda Una Señal"
3. "Oye Mi Amor"
4. "Labios Compartidos"

== Off-tour appearances ==
Date	City	Country	Venue
Premio Lo Nuestro 2011
February 17, 2011	Miami	United States	American Airlines Arena
Private Concert by SuperEstrella – 107.1 FM KSSE
April 12, 2011	Los Angeles	United States	Music Box Theater
Private Concert by 93.1 FM Amor WPAT-FM
April 14, 2011	New York City	United States	Irving Plaza
Private Concert by Amor 107.5 FM WAMR-FM
April 15, 2011	Miami	United States	The Fillmore Theater
2011 Latin Billboard Music Awards
April 26, 2011	Coral Gables	United States	BankUnited Center
Private Concert by Los 40 Principales
May 3, 2011	Madrid	Spain	Arteria Coliseum Theatre
Latin Grammy Awards of 2011
November 10, 2011	Las Vegas	United States	Mandalay Bay Events Center
Los Premios Telehit 2011
November 17, 2011	Acapulco	Mexico	Forum Mundo Imperial
Premios Cadena Dial 2011
February 22, 2012	Santa Cruz de Tenerife	Spain	Auditorio de Tenerife
Premios Casandra 2012
March 13, 2012	Santo Domingo	Dominican Republic	Teatro Nacional
2012 Latin Billboard Music Awards
April 26, 2012	Coral Gables	United States	BankUnited Center

== Tour dates ==
Date	City	Country	Venue
North America I
June 16, 2011	San Juan	Puerto Rico	Coliseo de Puerto Rico, José Miguel Agrelot
June 17, 2011	San Juan	Puerto Rico	Coliseo de Puerto Rico, José Miguel Agrelot
June 18, 2011	San Juan	Puerto Rico	Coliseo de Puerto Rico, José Miguel Agrelot
June 23, 2011	Los Angeles	United States	Staples Center
June 24, 2011	Los Angeles	United States	Staples Center
June 25, 2011	Los Angeles	United States	Staples Center
June 26, 2011	Los Angeles	United States	Staples Center
June 29, 2011	San Antonio	United States	AT&T Center
June 30, 2011	Dallas	United States	American Airlines Center
July 2, 2011	Houston	United States	Toyota Center
July 3, 2011	Houston	United States	Toyota Center
July 7, 2011	Miami	United States	American Airlines Arena
July 9, 2011	Orlando	United States	Amway Arena
July 10, 2011	Duluth	United States	Arena at Gwinnett Center
July 14, 2011	Fairfax	United States	Patriot Center
July 16, 2011	Newark	United States	Prudential Center
July 17, 2011	Boston	United States	Agganis Arena
July 21, 2011	Chicago	United States	Allstate Arena
July 22, 2011	Chicago	United States	Allstate Arena
Europe
September 9, 2011	Murcia	Spain	Estadio de La Condomina
September 10, 2011	Málaga	Spain	Estadio La Rosaleda
September 15, 2011	Madrid	Spain	Palacio de Deportes de Madrid
September 17, 2011	Bilbao	Spain	Bizkaia Arena
September 18, 2011	Oviedo	Spain	Estadio Carlos Tartiere
September 20, 2011	Barcelona	Spain	Palau Sant Jordi
September 23, 2011	Las Palmas	Spain	Estadio Gran Canaria
September 24, 2011	Tenerife	Spain	Estadio Heliodoro R. López
South America
October 1, 2011^{[A]}	Rio de Janeiro	Brazil	Parque Olímpico Cidade do Rock
North America II
October 12, 2011	Ciudad Juárez	Mexico	Estadio Olímpico Benito Juárez
October 21, 2011	Monterrey	Mexico	Monterrey Arena
October 22, 2011	Monterrey	Mexico	Monterrey Arena
October 26, 2011	Guadalajara	Mexico	Estadio Tres de Marzo
October 28, 2011	Mexico City	Mexico	Palacio de los Deportes
October 29, 2011	Mexico City	Mexico	Palacio de los Deportes
November 2, 2011	Guatemala City	Guatemala	Estadio del Ejército
November 4, 2011	San Salvador	El Salvador	Estadio Jorge González
November 6, 2011	Tegucigalpa	Honduras	Estadio Chochi Sosa
November 12, 2011	Panama City	Panama	Figali Convention Center
South America
November 26, 2011	Santiago	Chile	Estadio Bicentenario de La Florida
November 30, 2011	Mendoza	Argentina	Estadio Malvinas Argentinas
December 3, 2011	Buenos Aires	Argentina	Estadio José Amalfitani
December 4, 2011	Buenos Aires	Argentina	Estadio José Amalfitani
December 8, 2011	Rosario	Argentina	Estadio Marcelo Bielsa
December 10, 2011	Córdoba	Argentina	Estadio Mario Alberto Kempes
December 13, 2011	Corrientes	Argentina	Estadio José A. Romero Feris
December 15, 2011	Asunción	Paraguay	Jockey Club
December 17, 2011	Montevideo	Uruguay	Estadio Centenario
South America II
February 24, 2012	Quito	Ecuador	Estadio Olímpico Atahualpa
February 27, 2012	Guayaquil	Ecuador	Estadio Modelo Alberto S. Herrera
March 1, 2012	Medellín	Colombia	Estadio Atanasio Girardot
March 3, 2012	Bogotá	Colombia	Hipódromo De Los Andes
March 7, 2012	Puerto la Cruz	Venezuela	Estadio José Antonio Anzoátegui
March 10, 2012	Valencia	Venezuela	Parque Musical Evenpro
March 11, 2012	Caracas	Venezuela	Estadio de Fútbol USB
North America III
March 14, 2012	Santo Domingo	Dominican Republic	Estadio Quisqueya
April 3, 2012	Hidalgo	United States	State Farm Arena
April 4, 2012	Houston	United States	Toyota Center
April 5, 2012	Dallas	United States	American Airlines Center
April 7, 2012	Laredo	United States	Laredo Energy Arena
April 10, 2012	New York City	United States	Madison Square Garden
April 11, 2012	New York City	United States	Madison Square Garden
April 13, 2012	Chicago	United States	Allstate Arena
April 17, 2012	Sacramento	United States	Power Balance Pavilion
April 19, 2012	Los Angeles	United States	Staples Center
April 20, 2012	Los Angeles	United States	Staples Center
April 22, 2012	Fresno	United States	Save Mart Center
April 24, 2012	San Diego	United States	Valley View Casino Center
April 25, 2012	Los Angeles	United States	Staples Center
April 27, 2012	Oakland	United States	Oracle Arena
May 1, 2012	Denver	United States	Pepsi Center
May 4, 2012	Phoenix	United States	US Airways Center
May 6, 2012	El Paso	United States	El Paso County Coliseum
May 8, 2012	San Antonio	United States	AT&T Center
May 9, 2012	Corpus Christi	United States	American Bank Center
May 11, 2012	Miami	United States	American Airlines Arena
June 9, 2012^{[B]}	Dallas	United States	Cotton Bowl
Europe II
June 30, 2012^{[C]}	Madrid	Spain	Ciudad del Rock
July 7, 2012^{[D]}	Milan	Italy	Forum di Assago
Asia
July 12, 2012	Tel Aviv	Israel	Nokia Arena
North America IV
September 1, 2012^{[E]}	Curaçao	Curaçao	World Trade Center Curaçao
September 7, 2012	San Juan	Puerto Rico	José Miguel Agrelot Coliseum
September 13, 2012	Bakersfield	United States	Rabobank Arena
September 14, 2012	Oakland	United States	Oracle Arena
September 16, 2012	Las Vegas	United States	MGM Grand Garden Arena
September 18, 2012	Ontario	United States	Citizens Business Bank Arena
September 20, 2012	Tucson	United States	Tucson Arena
September 28, 2012	Monterrey	Mexico	Monterrey Arena
October 5, 2012	Mexico City	Mexico	Palacio de los Deportes
South America III
October 23, 2012	Rio de Janeiro	Brazil	Citibank Hall
October 26, 2012	São Paulo	Brazil	Credicard Hall
October 28, 2012	Belo Horizonte	Brazil	Chevrolet Hall
November 1, 2012	Porto Alegre	Brazil	Pepsi On Stage
North America V
November 29, 2012	León	Mexico	Poliforum
November 30, 2012	Querétaro	Mexico	Estadio Corregidora
December 7, 2012	Guadalajara	Mexico	Auditorio Telmex
December 8, 2012	Guadalajara	Mexico	Auditorio Telmex
February 13, 2013	Veracruz	Mexico	Carnival in Veracruz
February 16, 2013	Puebla	Mexico	Auditorio Siglo XXI
South America IV
February 24, 2013^{[F]}	Viña del Mar	Chile	Quinta Vergara Amphitheater
North America VI
March 6, 2013	San José	Costa Rica	Estadio Ricardo Saprissa
March 9, 2013^{[G]}	Guatemala City	Guatemala	Estadio Mateo Flores
March 14, 2013	San Pedro Sula	Honduras	Estadio Francisco Morazán
March 16, 2013	Managua	Nicaragua	Estadio Nacional
February 8, 2014	Mérida	Mexico	Coliseo Yucatán
February 14, 2014	Pachuca	Mexico	Parque David Ben Gurión

Festivals and other miscellaneous performances
^{A} This show is part of Rock in Rio.
^{B} This show is part of H2O Music Festival.
^{C} This show is part of Rock in Rio Madrid.
^{D} This show is part of Latinoamericando Festival.
^{E} This show is part of Curaçao North Sea Jazz Festival.
^{F} This show is part of Viña del Mar International Song Festival.
^{G} This show is part of Tigo Fest

== Tour personnel ==
=== Band ===
- Fher Olvera – main vocals, guitar, harmonics, and group member
- Alex González – drums, coros and group member
- Sergio Vallín – acoustic & electric guitars and group member
- Juan Diego Calleros – bass and group member

=== Additional Band ===
- Juan Carlos Toribio – keyboards
- Fernando "Psycho" Vallín – backup guitar, coros
- Hector Quintana – percussions, coros

=== Management & Staff ===
- Personal Manager – Angelo Medina
- Personal Manager – Ulises Calleros
- Tour Manager – Fabian Serrano
- Production Manager – Roly Garbaloza
- Art Director – Luis Pastor
- Stage Manager – Francisco "Coco" Ayon
- Sound Engineer – Fernando Perez Claudin
- Video Engineer – Auturo Lopez Gorza
- Guitar Technician – Enrique Vallín
- Drum Technician – Julio Galindo Moreno
- G-Lec Video Led Screen Head – Alejandro Pasten
- Production Coordinator – Jorge Reyes

== Award(s) ==
- Los Premios 40 Principales 2011: Best Concert/Tour
