= 2006 in Latin music =

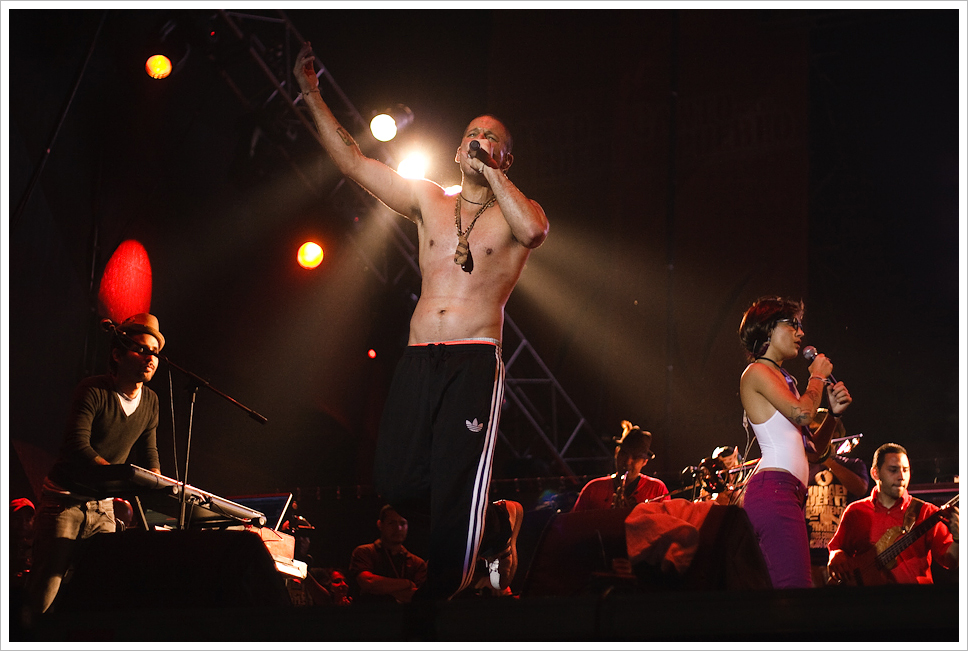
Puerto Rican band Calle 13 won the Latin Grammy Award for Best New Artist.

This is a list of notable events in Latin music (i.e. Spanish- and Portuguese-speaking music from Latin America, Latin Europe, and the United States) that took place in 2006.

== Events ==
- November 3 — The 7th Annual Latin Grammy Awards are held at the Madison Square Garden in New York City, New York.
  - Shakira is the biggest winner receiving four awards including Album of the Year for Fijación Oral, Vol. 1 and Record of the Year and Song of the Year for "La Tortura" featuring Alejandro Sanz.
  - Calle 13 wins Best New Artist.
- December 16 — At the first Premios Principales del Año (later known as Premios 40 Principales and currently Los 40 Music Awards) awards ceremony in Madrid, El Canto del Loco win three of the national categories; Shakira wins two awards in international categories.

== Number-ones albums and singles by country ==
- List of number-one singles of 2006 (Spain)
- List of number-one Billboard Top Latin Albums of 2006
- List of number-one Billboard Hot Latin Songs of 2006

== Awards ==
- 2006 Premio Lo Nuestro
- 2006 Billboard Latin Music Awards
- 2006 Latin Grammy Awards
- 2006 Tejano Music Awards

== Albums released ==
=== First quarter ===
==== January ====
Day	Title	Artist	Genre(s)	Singles	Label
3	De Uns Tempos Pra Cá	Chico César			RP Music
10	Cubist Music	Edsel Gomez	Afro-Cuban Jazz		Zoho
10	Brasilatinidade ao Vivo	Martinho da Vila	Samba		MZA Music, EMI
23	Grrr!	Moderatto	Pop rock, Glam		EMI, Labels Mexico
24	Rancherisimas Con Banda	Graciela Beltrán	Banda, Ranchera		Univision Records
31	Soy Diferente	La India	Salsa, Reggaeton	"Soy Diferente" "Solamente una Noche"	Univision Music Group
31	Amor	Andrea Bocelli	Bolero, Vocal, Latin Pop		Sugar

==== February ====
Day	Title	Artist	Genre(s)	Singles	Label
5	A Lifetime Of Hits... Live At Centro De Bellas Artes, San Juan, Puerto Rico	Richie Ray & Bobby Cruz	Salsa		Tropisounds
7	Baile Barroco	Daniela Mercury	Axe, Samba		ZYX Music
13	Nuevo Quinteto Real	Nuevo Quinteto Real			
13	Bien de arriba	Nestor Marconi Trio	Tango		WEA
14	Masterpiece	R.K.M & Ken-Y	Reggaeton	"Dame Lo Que Quiero" "Down" "Me Matas" "Igual Que Ayer"	Pina Records
14	Timeless	Sérgio Mendes	Bossanova, Bounce	"Mas Que Nada" "That Heat" "Yes Yes, Y'all"	Concord Records
19	Rodrigo y Gabriela	Rodrigo y Gabriela	Acoustic, Flamenco		ATO Records, Rubyworks
21	El Tequilero	Los Originales de San Juan	Ranchera, Tejano		EMI Latin
21	Un Momento En El Sonido	Vicente Amigo	Flamenco		Columbia, Sony BMG Music Entertainment
28	Algo de Mi	Conjunto Primavera			Fonovisa
28	Duele el Amor	Alegres de la Sierra			
28	Still Kickin' It	Akwid and Jae-P			
28	20 mil heridas	Banda Machos	Banda		Warner Music Mexico
28	Nuevamente	La Mafia	Tejano		Univision Records
28	Rhapsody In Blue	Michel Camilo and Ernest Martínez Izquierdo	Classical		

==== March ====
Day	Title	Artist	Genre(s)	Singles	Label
7	Motel	Motel	Rock En Español		
7	En El Auditorio Nacional	Joan Sebastian	Ranchera		Musart, Sony Music Entertainment
7	Antesala	Andy Boy	Reggaeton		Machete Music
13	Poncho al viento	Soledad Pastorutti	Chamame, Folk, Zamba, Chacarera		Columbia, Columbia, Sony Music
14	Dulce Beat	Belanova	House, Europop, Euro House	"Me Pregunto" "Por Ti" "Rosa Pastel" "Niño"	Universal Music Latino
14	Directo al Corazón	Gilberto Santa Rosa	Salsa	"Locura de Amor" "Por la Herida de un Amor"	Sony Discos
14	Polbo	Polbo	Alternative Rock, Indie Rock		Universal Music Latino
14	Roda Carioca	Jovino Santos Neto	Contemporary Jazz		Adventure Music
20	Samba Passarinho	Péri	Bossanova, Samba		Rambling Records
21	Top of the Line	Tito "El Bambino"	Reggaeton	"Caile" "Flow Natural" "Mía" "Tu Cintura"	EMI
21	Vida de Perros	Los Bunkers	Alternative Rock		La Oreja, Nacional Records
28	Éxitos y Más	Monchy & Alexandra	Bachata	"No Es una Novela"	J&N Records
28	Prohibido	El Coyote y Su Banda Tierra Santa	Banda		
28	Para Amarte Mejor	Andrés Cepeda	Latin Pop		FM Discos Y Cintas, S.A.

=== Second quarter ===
==== April ====
Day	Title	Artist	Genre(s)	Singles	Label
1	Sandy & Junior (2006)	Sandy & Junior			Universal Music, Mercury
3	AM/PM Líneas Paralelas	Andy Montañez and Pablo Milanés			
3	Terra Amantiquira	Banda Mantiqueira	Latin Jazz		Maritaca
3	Sinfonia Flamenca	Juan Carmona	Flamenco		Le Chant Du Monde
4	Kumbia Kings Live	A.B. Quintanilla y Los Kumbia Kings	Tejano	"Pachuco"	EMI Music Mexico
4	Historias Que Contar	Los Tigres del Norte	Norteño, Conjunto, Tejano		FonoVisa
4	Enamorado	Pepe Aguilar			EMI, EMI Televisa Music
4	Pa Mi Raza	Jae-P			
4	Indeleble	Alejandra Guzmán	Latin rock	"Volverte a Amar" "Quiero Estar Contigo"	Sony BMG Music Entertainment, RCA
4	Decórame El Corazón	Guardianes del Amor	Grupera		
4	La Guitarra Argentina	Cacho Tirao			
4	La cantina: ‘Entre copa y copa...	Lila Downs			
11	Esta Noche Está Para Boleros	Chucho Avellanet	Bolero		Klasico Records
11	13 Cumbias Revolucionadas	Tropical Panama	Cumbia		
18	Orgullo de Mujer	Alicia Villareal	Ranchera		Universal Music Latino
18	Vencedor	Valentín Elizalde	Norteno, Banda, Corrido		Universal Music Latino, Regio
18	Así Soy Yo	Anaís	Ballad	"Lo Que Son Las Cosas" "Estoy Con Él y Pienso en Ti"	Univision Records
18	Infinito Particular	Marisa Monte	MPB		EMI, Phonomotor Records
18	Universo ao Meu Redor	Marisa Monte	Bossanova, MPB		EMI, Phonometer Records, EMI, Phonometer Records
25	Postales del Alma	Lito Vitale and Juan Carlos Baglietto			
25	Guapa	La Oreja de Van Gogh	Pop rock, Europop	"Muñeca de trapo" "Dulce Locura" "Perdida" "En mi lado del sofá"	Sony BMG Music Entertainment, Columbia
25	Salsa con Reggaeton	Andy Montañez	Salsa, Reggaeton	"Se le Ve" "En Mi Puertorro"	SGZ Entertainment
25	Dances, Prayers and Meditations for Peace	Néstor Torres	Contemporary Jazz, Fusion		Heads Up International
25	Individual	Fulano	Latin pop		Not On Label
25	25 Aniversario	Mariachi Sol de Mexico de José Hernández	Mariachi		
25	Servando y Florentino	Servando y Florentino	Salsa	"Una Canción Que Te Enamoré"	Universal
25	103 Boulevard	Johnny Ventura	Merengue, Reggaeton, Bachata		Musical Productions

==== May ====
Day	Title	Artist	Genre(s)	Singles	Label
1	Obrigado, Gente!	João Bosco	MPB		Universal Music, Mercury, Canal Brasil
2	Borrón y Cuenta Nueva	Grupo Montéz de Durango	Duranguense		
2	En Vivo: Siempre Contigo	Los Tucanes de Tijuana			
2	Siempre Imitado, Jamas Igualado	Los Rieleros del Norte			
2	No Es Brujeria	Ana Bárbara	Ranchera		Fonovisa Records
2	El Sexto Sentido (Re+Loaded)	Thalía	Ballad, Pop rock, House	"No, No, No" "Cantando por un sueño"	EMI Televisa Music, EMI Televisa Music
4	Live in Hollywood	RBD	Latin Pop	"No pares"	EMI, Capitol Music
8	Absolute Quintet	Dafnis Prieto	Latin Jazz		ZOHO
9	Todo Cambió	Camila	Latin	"Abrázame" "Coleccionista de Canciones" "Todo Cambió" "Solo Para Ti"	Norte
9	Decisión unánime	Víctor Manuelle	Salsa, Ballad	"Nuestro Amor Se Ha Vuelto Ayer" "Maldita Suerte" "Nunca Había Llorado Así"	Norte
16	Codes	Ignacio Berroa	Post Bop, Latin Jazz		Blue Note
16	Pa'l Mundo: Deluxe Edition	Wisin y Yandel	Reggaeton	"Pam Pam" "Toma"	Machete Music
22	Sim e Não	Nando Reis	Pop rock		Universal Music, Mercury
22	Sou Brasileiro	Frank Aguilar	Forro		FA Music, EMI
23	King of Kings	Don Omar	Reggaeton	"Angelito" "Conteo" "Salió el Sol"	Machete Music
23	Lo demás es plástico	Black Guayaba	Hard Rock, Pop rock, Folk Rock		OLE Music, Rockpit Records
23	What You've Been Waiting For/Lo Que Esperabas	Tiempo Libre	Timba, Salsa		Shanachie
23	Viva	Diego Urcola, Edward Simon, Avishai Cohen, Antonio Sánchez and Pernell Saturnino	Latin Jazz		C.A.M. Jazz
23	Mejor Que Nunca	Jimmy González & El Grupo Mazz	Tejano		
23	Interpretan Éxitos de Juan Gabriel	Los Ángeles Azules			
23	Letters from Argentina	Lalo Schifrin	Tango		Aleph Records
24	Viejas Locas	Viejas Locas	Classic Rock		Discos FMP
29	Uma Nova Paixão ao Vivo	Alcione	MPB		
29	Vida Marvada	Chitãozinho & Xororó	Country		Mercury, Universal Music
29	Diferente	Zezé Di Camargo & Luciano	Forro		Sony Music
30	Contigo Me Voy	Rosario	Vocal, Flamenco, Ballad		Ariola, Sony BMG Music Entertainment

==== June ====
Day	Title	Artist	Genre(s)	Singles	Label
1	Levante a Taça	Caju & Castanha	Brazilian roots		
6	Cosa Nostra	Gran Omar and Ivy Queen	Reggaeton	"Paquetes" "No Hacen Na"	La Calle
6	Limón y Sal	Julieta Venegas	Mariachi, Tejano, Pop rock, Ranchera	"Me Voy" "Limón y Sal" "Eres Para Mí" "Primer día" "De Que Me Sirve"	Norte
6	Relaciones Conflictivas	Duelo			
6	La Trayectoria	Gloria Trevi	Latin pop		Univision Records
6	Tierra Extraña	Patrulla 81			Disa
6	Pescado Original	Enanitos Verdes	Pop rock		Universal Music Group
6	Ahí vamos	Gustavo Cerati	Pop rock		Ariola, Sony BMG
6	Serenata En San Juan	Melina León and Los Tri-O	Bolero		Norte, Sony BMG Music Entertainment
6	Ana e Jorge ao Vivo	Ana Carolina and Seu Jorge			Naive
13	Grandes Exitos En Vivo	Jorge Celedón and Jimmy Zambrano	Vallenato		Sony BMG Music Entertainment
13	Carioca	Chico Buarque	MPB		Biscoito Fino, Abril Colecoes
20	Más Alla del Sol	Joan Sebastian	Ranchera		Musart
20	A Paso Firme	Alacranes Musical			Aguila Records
20	Los Rompe Discotekas	Héctor el Father	Reggaeton		Def Jam Recordings, Roc La Familia, Machete Music, Vi Music, Gold Star Music
20	Tierra Cali	Tierra Cali			
20	Joyas Prestadas	Niña Pastori	Flamenco, Vocal		Ariola, Sony BMG Music Entertainment
22	Quero Colo	Leonardo	Ballad, Country		BMG Brasil, RCA
27	Puro pa' arriba	Los Huracanes del Norte	Norteno		Univision Records, Univision Music Group

=== Third quarter ===
==== July ====
Day	Title	Artist	Genre(s)	Singles	Label
1	Minhas Canções	Fábio Jr.	Ballad		RCA, Sony BMG Music Entertainment
3	De Corpo e Alma	Leonardo	Ballad, Folk		Mercury, Universal Music
4	Evoluciones	Los Palominos	Tejano		
4	Spain Again	Michel Camilo and Tomatito	Fusion, Flamenco		Emarcy, Universal
11	Sigo Siendo Yo: Grandes Éxitos	Marc Anthony	Salsa, Europop, Ballad	"Qué Preció Tiene el Cielo"	Norte, Sony BMG Music Entertainment
11	Sigue el Taconazo	Chente Barrera y Taconazo			Q-Vo Records
11	Brasilianos	Hamilton de Holanda Quintet	Latin Jazz		Adventure Music
12	Memo Rex Commander y el Corazón Atómico de la Vía Láctea	Zoé	Alternative rock, psychedelic rock		Noiselab Records, Labels Mexico
18	Libre	Gisselle	Merengue	"De Que Nos Vale"	Universal Music Latino
18	Amor Gitano	Cuisillos	Ranchera		Musart
18	Un Fuego de Sangre Pura	Los Gaiteros de San Jacinto	Porro, Cumbia, Corrido		Smithsonian Folkways
20	En Vivo	Michael Salgado			
22	Acariocando	Ivan Lins	MPB		EMI
24	Amor Absoluto	Daniel	Brazilian romantic		Continental East West
25	Navegando Por Ti	José Luis Perales	Ballad		Columbia, Sony BMG Music Entertainment (Mexico), S.A. De C.V.

==== August ====
Day	Title	Artist	Genre(s)	Singles	Label
1	MTV ao Vivo CPM 22	CPM 22	Alternative Rock		Universal Music, Arsenal Music
1	Conterrâneos	Dominguinhos	MPB, Forro		Eldorado
8	Lágrimas Cálidas	Fanny Lu	Vallenato	"No Te Pido Flores" "Te Arrepentiras" "Y Si Te Digo"	Universal Music Latino
8	En Vivo: El Original	Toño Rosario	Merengue	"A lo Oscuro"	Universal Music Latino
10	E Aí?	Jorge Aragão			Indie Records Ltda.
14	Standards Rican-ditioned	Ray Barretto	Latin Jazz		ZOHO
14	Esta Es Mi Vida	Jesse & Joy	Nueva Cancion	"Espacio Sideral" "Ya No Quiero" "Volveré" "Llegaste Tú" "Somos Lo Que Fue"	Warner Music Mexico
22	Amar es Combatir	Maná	Pop rock, Alternative Rock	"Labios Compartidos" "Bendita Tu Luz" "Manda Una Señal" "Ojalá Pudiera Borrarte" "El Rey Tiburón"	Warner Music Mexico
22	El Mundo Se Equivoca	La 5ª Estación	Pop rock, Ballad	"Tu Peor Error" "Me Muero" "Sueños Rotos" "Ahora Que Te Vas" "La Frase Tonta De La Semana"	Sony BMG Music Entertainment, Ariola
22	Around the City	Eliane Elias	Bossa Nova, Contemporary Jazz		Bluebird, RCA Victor
22	Fuzionado	Oscar D'León	Tropical		
22	Érase Que Se Era	Silvio Rodríguez	Nueva Trova		Ojala, Sony BMG Music Entertainment
22	Escúchame	Pedro Fernández			Universal Music Latino
23	Ao Vivo em Goiânia	Bruno & Marrone	Country		Sony BMG Music Entertainment
29	The Underdog/El Subestimado	Tego Calderón	Reggaeton	"Los Maté" "Chillin'" "Cuando Baila Reggaeton" "Llora, Llora"	Jiggiri Records, Atlantic
29	Dismiss the Mystery	Salvador	Latin Christian		Word, Curb Records, Warner Bros. Records
29	Lo Que Trajo el Barco	Obie Bermúdez	Ballad, Soft Rock		EMI Televisa Music
29	Mas Fuerte Que Nunca	Banda el Recodo			
29	Son...Para El Mundo	Jorge Celedón and Jimmy Zambrano	Vallenato, Ranchera		Sony BMG Music Entertainment
29	Reggaeton Rulers: Los Que Ponen	Various Artists	Reggaeton		Capitol Latin

==== September ====
Day	Title	Artist	Genre(s)	Singles	Label
1	cê	Caetano Veloso	Bossanova, MPB		Universal Music, Mercury
1	Trilhas	Naná Vasconcelos	Contemporary Jazz, Latin Jazz, Score		Azul Music
5	Toby Love	Toby Love	Bachata	"Tengo Un Amor" "Don't Cry (La Niña Que Soñe)"	Sony BMG Norte
5	Super Pop Venezuela	Los Amigos Invisibles	House, Disco		Gozadera Records
5	Reina	Kinky	House, Disco		Kin Kon Records, Nettwerk
12	All Of Me	Jay Perez	Tejano		Tejas Records
12	Tango Legends	Vayo	Tango		Pantaleon Records
13	Made in Argentina 2005	Andrés Calamaro	Cumbia, Tango		Gasa, Warner Music Argentina
19	Ananda	Paulina Rubio	Pop rock, Soft Rock, Ranchera, Euro House	"Ni Una Sola Palabra" "Nada Puede Cambiarme" "Ayúdame" "Que Me Voy A Quedar"	Universal Music Latino
19	12 Segundos de Oscuridad	Jorge Drexler	Vocal		DRO Atlantic
19	La Travesía	Joe Veras	Bachata	"En El Amor"	J&N Records, JVN Musical Inc.
19	Los Reyes Del Perreo	Alexis y Fido	Reggaeton	"Me Quiere Besar"	Fresh, Sony BMG Norte, Wild Dogz
20	El Mundo Cabe en Una Canción	Fito Páez	Pop rock		Sony Bmg Music Entertainment
26	Top Secrets	Willie Colón	Salsa, Son		Fania Records
26	Trozos de Mi Alma, Vol. 2	Marco Antonio Solís	Latin pop	"Antes de Que Te Vayas" "Ojalá" "No Puedo Olvidarla" "Te Voy a Esperar	Fonovisa
26	Mas Flow: Los Benjamins	Luny Tunes and Tainy	Reggaeton	"Noche de Entierro (Nuestro Amor)" "Royal Rumble (Se Van)" "Lento"	Cinq Music Group
26	Entre Copas y Botellas	Lupillo Rivera			Venevision International Music, LLC
26	Piensame un Momento	Pesado			Warner Music Latina
26	Mil y Una Historias En Vivo	Franco De Vita	Ballad	"Tengo"	Norte, Sony BMG Music Entertainment
26	Con Sabor A Mi	Kinito Méndez	Merengue		
26	Cabalgando En Las Canciones de Joan Sebastian	Caballo Dorado	Grupera		

=== Fourth quarter ===
==== October ====
Day	Title	Artist	Genre(s)	Singles	Label
1	Especiaria	Flavio Chamis			
3	Ayer Fue Kumbia Kings, Hoy Es Kumbia All Starz	A.B. Quintanilla III y los Kumbia All Starz	Cumbia	"Chiquilla" "Parece Que Va a Llover" "Speedy Gonzales" "Mami/Anoche No Dormí"	EMI Televisa Music
3	E.S.L.	Akwid	G-Funk		Univision Records
3	La Produccion Maestra 2006	Banda Pequenos Musica	Ranchera, Cumbia		Fonovisa Records, Alaska Records, Universal Music Group Mexico
3	Utopía	Belinda	Pop rock	"Ni Freud Ni Tu Mamá" "Bella Traición" "Luz Sin Gravedad" "Alguien Más" "Es De Verdad"	EMI, Televisa EMI Music
3	Amantes Sunt Amentes	Panda	Alternative Rock		Movic Records, Warner Music Mexico
3	Pasajero	Gipsy Kings	Europop Flamenco		Sony BMG Music Entertainment
10	Soy Como Tú	Olga Tañón	Merengue	"Desilusióname" "María"	Univision Records
17	Mi Sueño	Marlon Fernández	Salsa	"Usted Abusó"	La Calle Records
17	Que Bonita Es Mi Tierra... y sus Canciones	Pablo Montero	Ranchera		
23	Las Siete y Media	Iván Ferreiro	Alternative Rock		WEA
23	Tierra De Calma	Miguel Poveda	Flamenco		DiscMedi Blau
24	Crossroads: Cruce de Caminos	Intocable	Norteño		EMI, EMI Televisa Music
24	The Shadow Of Your Wings: Hymns And Sacred Songs	Fernando Ortega	Acoustic, Soft Rock, Religious		Curb Records
24	Oye	Aterciopelados	Latin alternative		Nacional Records
24	Desatados	Los Horóscopos de Durango	Cumbia, Ranchera		D Disa Latin Music, S. De R.L. De C.V.
24	Sigo Siendo Yo	Héctor Acosta "el Torito"	Merengue, Bachata	"Me Voy"	Hector Acosta & Orquesta S.A.
25	Los Pajaros	Vicentico	Pop rock, Ska		Ariola, Sony BMG Music Entertainment
26	Baladas do Asfalto & Outros Blues ao Vivo	Zeca Baleiro	Brazilian Pop		MZA Music, Universal Music
31	Alegría	Marcos Witt	Latin Christian		Norte
31	Un Tiempo, Un Estilo, Un Amor	Los Ángeles de Charly	Grupera		
31	A Punto a Estallar	N'Klabe	Salsa, Reggaeton	"Ella Volvió"	Norte, NuLife Entertainment

==== November ====
Day	Title	Artist	Genre(s)	Singles	Label
1	Ao Vivo	Gal Costa	MPB		
1	Eternamente Cauby Peixoto: 55 Anos de Carreira	Cauby Peixoto	Brazilian romantic		
6	Concerto em Lisboa	Mariza	Fado		World Connection, Capitol Records, EMI Music Portugal
6	Acústico MTV 2 Gafieira	Zeca Pagodinho	Samba		Mercury, Universal Music
7	El Tren de los Momentos	Alejandro Sanz	Acoustic, Soft Rock, Pop rock, Latin Pop	"A la Primera Persona" "Te Lo Agradezco, Pero No" "Enséñame Tus Manos" "En la Planta de Tus Pies"	WEA
7	MTV Unplugged	Ricky Martin	Latin pop	"Tu Recuerdo" "Pégate" "Gracias por Pensar en Mi" "Con Tu Nombre"	Sony BMG Music Entertainment
7	La Reina Canta a México	Ana Gabriel	Vocal		Sony Music Latin
7	In The Zone	Ed Calle			Mojito Records, Union Music Group, Union Records
7	La Republica	Ilegales	Latin, Hip-House, Bachata, Merengue, Reggaeton		Universal Music Latino
7	Los Vaqueros	Wisin & Yandel	Reggaeton	"Pegao" "Dame Un Kiss" "Yo Te Quiero" "Quizás"	Machete Music, WY Records
14	K.O.B. Live	Aventura	Bachata	"Los Infieles" "Mi Corazoncito" "El Perdedor"	Norte
14	José Feliciano y Amigos	José Feliciano	Latin pop	"Que Nadie Sepa Mi Sufrir"	Siente Music, Universal Music Latino
14	Conquistando Corazones	K-Paz de la Sierra	Norteno, Ranchera, Charanga, Cumbia		D Disa Latin Music, S. De R.L. De C.V.
14	Navidades	Luis Miguel	Christmas music, Latin Pop	"Santa Claus Llegó a la Ciudad" "Mi Humilde Oración"	Warner Music Latina
14	La Tragedia del Vaquero	Vicente Fernández	Ranchera, Corrido		Norte
14	Yo Canto	Laura Pausini	Soft Pop, Pop rock, Ballad, Vocal		Atlantic
14	Pasado	Sin Bandera	Salsa, Tango, Vocal, Ballad		Epic, Sony BMG Music Entertainment
14	Siluetas	Los Acosta	Cumbia		Fonovisa Records
16	Simpático	The Brian Lynch/Eddie Palmieri Project	Latin Jazz		ArtistShare
21	The Bad Boy	Héctor el Father	Reggaeton	"Sola"	Machete Music
21	Haciendo Historia	Xtreme	Bachata	"Shorty, Shorty" "No Me Digas Que No"	La Calle, Univision Music Group
21	Realtime	Limi-T 21			
21	Trova Con Salsa Pa'l Bailador	Sanabria	Salsa		
21	Pedazos de Mí	Amaury Gutiérrez			Universal Music Latino
21	Éxitos 98:06	Luis Fonsi	Ballad	"Tu Amor"	Universal
21	Secuencia	Reik	Pop rock	"Invierno" "Me Duele Amarte" "De Qué Sirve" "Sabes"	Norte
21	Nuevas Metas	La Factoría	Reggaeton		Universal Music Latino
24	Celestial	RBD	Pop rock, Ballad, Latin Pop	"Ser O Parecer" "Celestial" "Bésame Sin Miedo" "Dame"	Televisa Musica
27	De La Habana a Nueva York	Alfredo Valdés Jr.	Salsa, Son, Latin Jazz		Envida
28	Arroz Con Habichuela	El Gran Combo de Puerto Rico	Salsa	"No Hay Manera" "Arroz Con Habichuela" "Si la Ves Por Ahí" "Te Veo Nena" "Yo No Mendigo Amor"	Norte, Discos 605
28	35 Aniversario: En Vivo	Willy Chirino	Afro-Cuban, Son, Salsa		Norte
30	Raro	El Cuarteto de Nos	Alternative rock		Bizarro Records

==== December ====
Day	Title	Artist	Genre(s)	Singles	Label
1	Para Toda a Família	Sérgio Reis			
1	40 Anos de Carreira: Ao Vivo no Teatro Municipal Vol. 2	Beth Carvalho	Samba		Sony BMG Music Entertainment
4	NX Zero	NX Zero	Emo		Universal Music, Arsenal Music
5	Habla El Corazón	Yuridia	Ballad	"Como Yo Nadie Te Ha Amado" "Habla El Corazón"	Sony BMG Music Entertainment, Azteca Music
5	Masa Con Masa	Millo Torres and El Tercer Planeta	Reggae, Ska		Machete Music
6	Mujer de Fe	Paulina Aguirre	Latin Christian		
14	40 Anos de Sucesso Do Bom Rapaz	Wanderley Cardoso	MPB		EMI
19	Más Grande Que Tú	Miguelito	Reggaeton		El Cartel Records, D & W Records

=== Dates unknown ===
Title	Artist	Genre(s)	Singles	Label
Prefiero la soledad	Retoño	Norteño		
Grafiti de Amor	Binomio de Oro de América	Vallenato		Codiscos, Costeno
Impredecible	Binomio de Oro de América	Vallenato		Codiscos, Costeno
Otra Vez Raices	The Legends			
Te Amo Tango	Raul Jaurena			Random Records S.R.L.
Prisma	Paulo Ricardo	Ballad, Pop rock		EMI
Carrossel	Skank	Pop rock, Alternative Rock		Sony BMG Music Entertainment
Balé Mulato - Ao Vivo	Daniela Mercury	Samba		Net FX
Oficina Elektracustika G3	Oficina G3	Gospel, Acoustic, Alternative Rock		MK Music
Esquemas Juveniles	Javiera Mena	Indie pop, Synth-Pop		Quemasucabeza

== Best-selling records ==
=== Best-selling albums ===
The following is a list of the top 10 best-selling Latin albums in the United States in 2006, according to Billboard.

Rank	Album	Artist
1	Barrio Fino en Directo	Daddy Yankee
2	Pa'l Mundo	Wisin & Yandel
3	King of Kings	Don Omar
4	Nuestro Amor	RBD
5	Da Hitman Presents Reggaetón Latino	Don Omar
6	Now Esto Es Musica! Latino	Various artists
7	Amar es Combatir	Maná
8	Fijación Oral, Vol. 1	Shakira
9	Rebelde	RBD
10	Mi Sangre	Juanes

=== Best-performing songs ===
The following is a list of the top 10 best-performing Latin songs in the United States in 2006, according to Billboard.

Rank	Album	Artist
1	"Down"	R.K.M & Ken-Y
2	"Hips Don't Lie"	Shakira featuring Wyclef Jean
3	"Rompe"	Daddy Yankee
4	"Aliado del Tiempo"	Mariano Barba
5	"Llamé Pa' Verte (Bailando Sexy)"	Wisin & Yandel
6	"Caile"	Tito "El Bambino"
7	"Machucando"	Daddy Yankee
8	"Angelito"	Don Omar
9	"Un Beso"	Aventura
10	"Labios Compartidos"	Maná

== Deaths ==
- February 1 – Horacio Buscaglia, 62, Uruguayan singer and composer
- February 17 – Ray Barretto, 76, American-born Latin jazz percussionist and bandleader, heart failure.
- March 23 – Pío Leyva, 88, Cuban musician (Buena Vista Social Club), heart attack.
- March 25 – Rocío Dúrcal, 61, Spanish singer and actress, uterine cancer.
- May 10 – Soraya, 37, Colombian-American songwriter, guitarist, arranger, record producer, and singer, breast cancer.
- June 1 – Rocío Jurado, 61, Spanish singer and actress, pancreatic cancer.
- June 6 – Hilton Ruiz, 54, American jazz pianist, injuries from a fall.
- July 1 – Israel Kantor, 56, Cuban singer
- July 11 – Oscar Moro, 58, Argentine drummer
- July 13 – Jesús Caunedo "La Gruya", Cuban alto sax musician
- August 6:
  - Miguel "Angá" Díaz, 45, Cuban conga player, heart attack.
  - Moacir Santos, 80, Brazilian composer and arranger.
- October 14 – Freddy Fender, 69, American singer ("Before the Next Teardrop Falls"), lung cancer.
- November 6 – Miguel Aceves Mejía, 90, Mexican singer and actor known as "the king of the falsetto", bronchitis.
- November 25 – Valentín Elizalde, 27, Mexican banda singer, shot.
- November 26 – Raúl Velasco, 73, Mexican television presenter (Siempre en Domingo), hepatitis C.
- December 14 – Sivuca, 76, Brazilian accordionist and composer, cancer.
