= Premio Lo Nuestro 2008 =

Latin Music awards show

20th Lo Nuestro Awards
- Date: February 21, 2008
- Location: American Airlines Arena
- Country: United States
- Hosted by: Pedro Fernández; Patricia Navidad

Television/radio coverage
- Network: Univision

Premio Lo Nuestro 2008 was held on February 21, 2008, at the American Airlines Arena in Miami, Florida. It was broadcast live by Univision Network.

== Host ==
- Pedro Fernández
- Patricia Navidad

== Performers ==
- 01. Intro — "Premio Lo Nuestro 20 Años Anniversario" — 01:02
- 02. Juanes (Opening Act) — "Me Enamora / Gotas De Agua Dulce" — 03:08
- 03. Cruz Martínez & Los Super Reyes — "Quédate Más (I Want You Back) / El Rey (Remix)" — 05:04
- 04. Pepe Aguilar — "Perdono Y Olvido / Río Rebelde / 100% Méxicano" — 04:51
- 05. Enrique Iglesias — "¿Dónde Están Corazón? / Dimelo" — 05:00
- 06. Maná — "Manda Una Señal" — 05:13
- 07. Olga Tañón — "¡Basta Ya! / Hoy Quiero Confesárme / Muchacho Malo / Es Mentiroso" — 06:00
- 08. Jenni Rivera — "Dama Divina" — 02:36
- 09. Wisin & Yandel — "Pégao / Sexy Movemento" — 04:40
- 10. Vicente Fernández — "Medley Ranchera" — 16:44
- 11. Aventura — "El Prededor" — 04:00
- 12. Camilia — "Yo Quiero" — 03:39
- 13. Elvis Crespo With Grupo Manía (Closing Act) — "Me Miras Y Te Miro / Linda Eh / Un Beso / Suavemente (Elvis Crespo song)" — 04:50

== Presenters ==
- Eduardo Verástegui
- Patricia Manterola
- Don Omar
- Angélica Vale
- Diana Reyes
- Alexandra Cheron
- Ilegales
- Lucy Pereda
- Antonio Vodanovic
- Cristián de la Fuente
- Dayanara Torres
- René Strickler
- JAN
- Fanny Lu
- Gloria Estefan
- Grupo Montéz de Durango
- Angélica María
- Belinda
- Tito "El Bambino"
- Paul Rodriguez (appear)
- Juan Luis Guerra
- Lalo Rodríguez
- Los Tigres del Norte
- María Elena Salinas
- Don Francisco
- José José
- Los Horóscopos de Durango
- Fernando Allende
- Karyme Lozano
- Ivy Queen
- Cristina Saralegui

== Special awards ==
=== Premio Lo Nuestro a la Excelencia (Lifetime Achievement Award) ===
- Vicente Fernández

=== Maximum Excellence Award ===
- Ricky Martin

=== Trayectoria Artist of the Year ===
- Olga Tañón

== Pop ==
=== Album of the Year ===
1. Ayer Fue Kumbia Kings, Hoy Es Kumbia All Starz, A.B. Quintanilla III Presenta Kumbia All Starz
2. Celestial, RBD
3. El Tren de los Momentos, Alejandro Sanz
4. Ricky Martin MTV Unplugged, Ricky Martin
5. Secuencia, Reik

=== Male Artist ===
1. Chayanne
2. David Bisbal
3. Enrique Iglesias
4. Ricky Martin

=== Female Artist ===
1. Belinda
2. Julieta Venegas
3. Paulina Rubio
4. Yuridia

=== Group or Duo ===
1. Camilia
2. La 5ª Estación
3. RBD
4. Reik

=== Song of the Year ===
1. "Chiquilla", Kumbia All Starz
2. "Dímelo", Enrique Iglesias
3. "Me Muero", La 5ª Estación
4. "Todo Cambió", Camila
5. "Tu Recuerdo", Ricky Martin Featuring La Mari de Chambao and Tommy Torres

=== Breakout Artist or Group of the Year ===
1. Kumbia All Starz
2. Beyoncé
3. Los Super Reyes
4. Jennifer Lopez

== Rock ==
=== Album of the Year ===
1. Amantes Sunt Amentes, Panda
2. Grrr!, Moderatto
3. Masa Con Masa, Millo Torres and El Tercer Planeta
4. Memo Rex Commander y el Corazón Atómico de la Vía Láctea, Zoé
5. Oye, Aterciopelados

=== Artist of the Year ===
1. Allison
2. Maná
3. Moderatto
4. Motel

=== Song of the Year ===
1. Bendita Tu Luz, Maná and Juan Luis Guerra
2. "Enamorado", Gustavo Laureano
3. Manda Una Señal, Maná
4. Ojalá Pudiera Borrarte, Maná
5. "Sentimettal", Moderatto

== Tropical ==
=== Album of the Year ===
1. Arroz con Habichuela, El Gran Combo de Puerto Rico
2. Haciendo Historia, Xtreme
3. K.O.B. Live, Aventura
4. La Llave de Mi Corazón, Juan Luis Guerra
5. Soy Como Tú, Olga Tañón

=== Male Artist of the Year ===
1. Fonseca
2. Juan Luis Guerra
3. Marc Anthony
4. Tito Nieves

=== Female Artist of the Year ===
1. Fanny Lu
2. Gloria Estefan
3. La India
4. Olga Tañón

=== Group or Duo of the Year ===
1. Aventura
2. El Gran Combo
3. Ilegales & Alexandra
4. Xtreme

=== Song of the Year ===
1. "Los Infieles", Aventura
2. "La Otra", Ilegales & Alexandra
3. "Mi Corazoncito", Aventura
4. "Que Me Des Tu Cariño", Juan Luis Guerra
5. "Shorty Shorty", Xtreme

=== Merengue Artist of the Year ===
1. Elvis Crespo
2. Juan Luis Guerra
3. Olga Tañón
4. Toño Rosario

=== Tropical Salsa Artist of the Year ===
1. El Gran Combo
2. Frankie Negrón
3. Marc Anthony
4. Tito Nieves

=== Tropical Traditional Artist of the Year ===
1. Aventura
2. Fanny Lu
3. Fonseca
4. Xtreme

== Regional Mexican Music ==
=== Album of the Year ===
1. Crossroads: Cruce de Caminos, Intocable
2. Ahora y Siempre, Alacranes Musical
3. Detalles y Emociones, Los Tigres del Norte
4. El Amor que Nunca Fue, Conjunto Primavera
5. Recio, Recio Mis Creadorez, Los Creadorez del Pasito Duranguense de Alfredo Ramírez

=== Male Artist of the Year ===
1. El Chapo de Sinaloa
2. Joan Sebastian
3. Marco Antonio Solís
4. Mariano Barba

=== Female Artist of the Year ===
1. Alicia Villarreal
2. Diana Reyes
3. Graciela Beltrán
4. Jenni Rivera

=== Group or Duo of the Year ===
1. Alegres de la Sierra
2. Conjunto Primavera
3. Intocable
4. Los Tigres del Norte

=== Song of the Year ===
1. "Dime Quien Es", Los Rieleros del Norte
2. "Cada Vez Que Pienso en Ti", Los Creadorez del Pasito Duranguense de Alfredo Ramírez
3. "De Rodillas Te Pido", Alegres de la Sierra
4. "La Noche Perfecta", El Chapo de Sinaloa
5. "Mil Heridas", Cuisillos

=== Banda of the Year ===
1. Cuisillos
2. El Chapo de Sinaloa
3. Joan Sebastian
4. La Arrolladora Banda El Limón

=== Grupera Artist of the Year ===
1. Bronco El Gigante de América
2. Bryndis
3. Control
4. Marco Antonio Solís

=== Norteño Artist of the Year ===
1. Alegres de la Sierra
2. Conjunto Primavera
3. Intocable
4. Los Tigres del Norte

=== Ranchera Artist of the Year ===
1. Alicia Villarreal
2. Pedro Fernández
3. Pepe Aguilar
4. Vicente Fernández

=== Breakout Artist or Group of the Year ===
1. Andrés Márquez
2. Banda Guasaveña
3. Fidel Rueda
4. Los Buitres de Culiacán Sinaloa

=== Duranguense Artist of the Year ===
1. Alacranes Musical
2. Los Creadorez del Pasito Duranguense de Alfredo Ramírez
3. Los Horóscopos de Durango
4. Montez de Durango

== Urban ==
=== Album of the Year ===
1. El Cartel: The Big Boss, Daddy Yankee
2. Los Vaqueros, Wisin & Yandel
3. The Perfect Melody, Zion
4. Sentimiento, Ivy Queen
5. The Bad Boy, Héctor el Father

=== Artist of the Year ===
1. Don Omar
2. Héctor el Father
3. R.K.M & Ken-Y
4. Wisin & Yandel

=== Song of the Year ===
1. "Igual Que Ayer", R.K.M & Ken-Y
2. "Impacto (Remix)", Daddy Yankee Featuring Fergie
3. "Pegao", Wisin & Yandel
4. "Siente El Boom", Tito "El Bambino" Featuring Randy
5. "Sola", Héctor el Father

== Video of the Year ==
1. "Baila Mi Corazón", Belanova
2. "Impacto", Daddy Yankee Featuring Fergie
3. Me Enamora, Juanes
4. "Pa'l Norte", Calle 13 Featuring Orishas
5. "Dímelo", Enrique Iglesias
