= List of awards and nominations received by Aventura =

Aventura awards and nominations
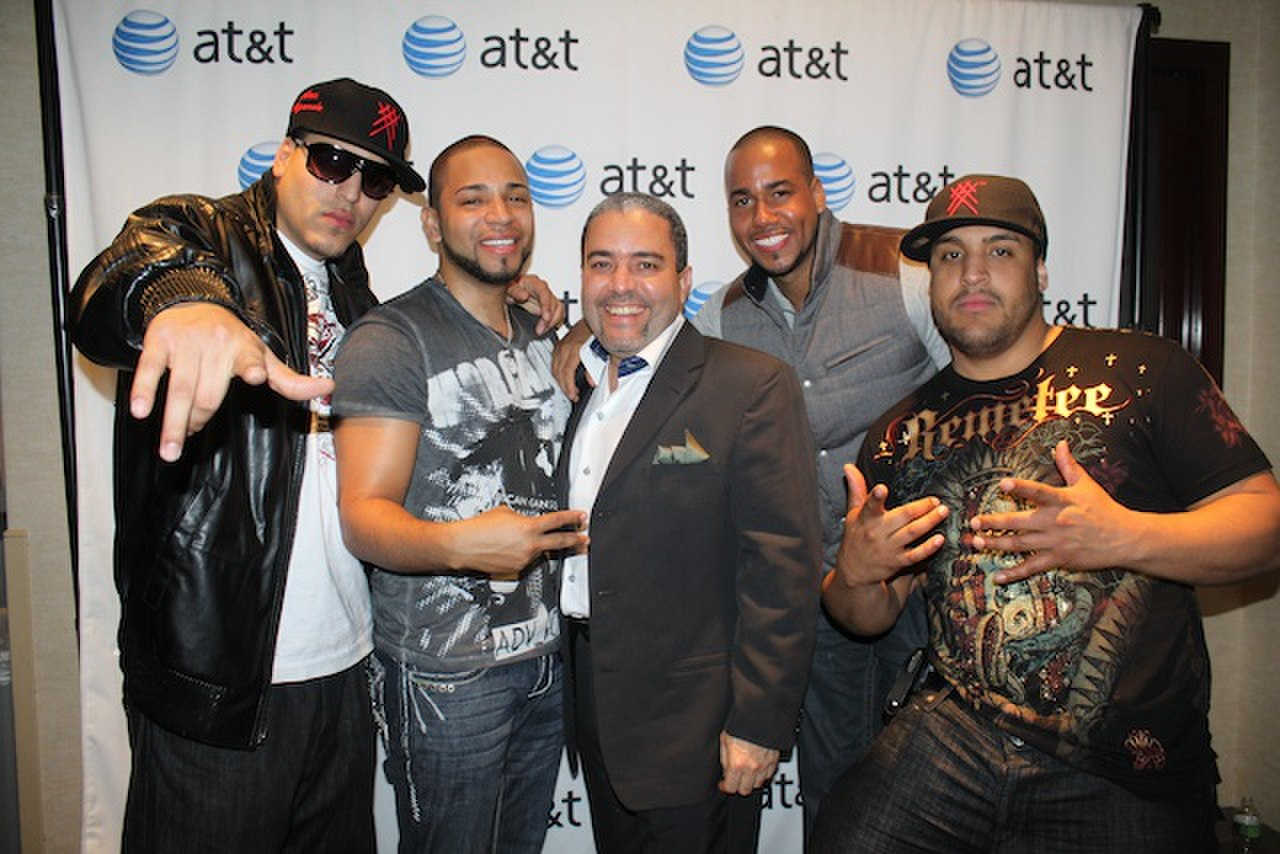
- The group Aventura
Awards and nominations
Award	Wins	Nominations
American Music Awards	1	1
Latin American Music Awards	3	6
Billboard Latin Music Awards	30	62
Billboard Music Awards	0	1
Latin Grammy Awards	0	1
Premios Juventud	11	26
Lo Nuestro Awards	23	29

Totals (Note: Certain award groups do not simply award one winner. They acknowledge several different recipients, have runners-up, and have third place. Since this is a specific recognition and is different from losing an award, runner-up mentions are considered wins in this award tally. For simplification and to avoid errors, each award in this list has been presumed to have had a prior nomination.)
- Wins: 66
- Nominations: 126

Aventura are an American bachata band of Dominican descent consisting of bass player Max "Mikey" Santos (Max Agende), guitar player Lenny Santos (Len Melody), singer-songwriter Henry Santos Jeter, and singer-songwriter Anthony "Romeo" Santos, who is also of Puerto-Rican decent. The group have won over 60 awards throughout their career. However, they have never won a Grammy or a Latin Grammy Award. They had one Latin Grammy Award nomination in 2007 for best Contemporary Tropical Album (for their K.O.B. Live album).

== American Music Awards ==
Year	Nominee / work	Award	Result
2009	Aventura	Favorite Latin Artist	Won

== Billboard Latin Music Awards ==
Year	Nominee / work	Award	Result
2006	Aventura	Artist of the Year	Nominated
2006	"Ella y Yo"	Vocal Duet or Collaboration of the Year, Vocal Duet or Collaboration	Nominated
2006	"Ella y Yo"	Tropical Airplay Song of the Year, Duo or Group	Won
2006	"La Boda"	Tropical Airplay Song of the Year, Duo or Group	Nominated
2006	God's Project	Tropical Album of the Year, Duo or Group	Won
2007	Aventura	Artist of the Year	Nominated
2007	"Noche De Sexo"	Hot Latin Songs of the Year, Vocal Duet or Collaboration	Nominated
2007	K.O.B. Live	Tropical Album of the Year, Duo or Group	Won
2007	Los Infieles	Tropical Airplay Song of the Year	Won
2008	Aventura	Top Latin Albums Artist of the Year	Nominated
2008	"Mi Corazoncito"	Hot Latin Song of the Year	Won
2008	"Mi Corazoncito"	Tropical Airplay Song of the Year, Duo or Group	Won
2008	"Mi Corazoncito"	Latin Ringmaster of the Year	Nominated
2008	Kings of Bachata: Sold Out at Madison Square Garden	Tropical Album of the Year, Duo or Group	Nominated
2009	Aventura	Latin Digital Download Artist of the Year	Nominated
2009	"El Perdedor"	Tropical Airplay Song of the Year, Duo or Group	Won
2009	"El Perdedor"	Latin Rhythm Airplay Song of the Year, Duo or Group	Won
2009	Kings of Bachata: Sold Out at Madison Square Garden	Latin Album of the Year	Nominated
2009	K.O.B. Live	Tropical Album of the Year, Duo or Group	Won
2010	Aventura	Latin Artist of the Year	Won
2010	Aventura	Hot Latin Songs Artist of the Year, Duo or Group	Won
2010	Aventura	Top Latin Albums Artist of the Year, Duo or Group	Won
2010	Aventura	Latin Pop Airplay Artist of the Year, Duo or Group	Won
2010	Aventura	Latin Rhythm Airplay, Artista del Año, Dúo o Grupo	Nominated
2010	Aventura	Tropical Airplay Artist of the Year, Duo or Group	Won
2010	Aventura	Tropical Albums Artist of the Year, Duo or Group	Won
2010	“All Up 2 You”	Hot Latin Songs, Colaboración Vocal	Nominated
2010	The Last	Latin Album of the Year	Won
2010	The Last	Tropical Album of the Year	Won
2010	The Last	Latin Digital Album of the Year	Won
2012	Aventura	Your World Award (Premio Tu Mundo)	Won
2012	Aventura	Latin Artist of the Year	Nominated
2012	Aventura	Hot Latin Songs Artist of the Year, Duo or Group	Nominated
2012	Aventura	Top Latin Albums Artist of the Year, Duo or Group	Nominated
2012	Aventura	Latin Pop Airplay Artist of the Year, Duo or Group	Nominated
2012	Aventura	Tropical Airplay Artist of the Year, Duo or Group	Nominated
2012	Aventura	Tropical Albums Artist of the Year, Duo or Group	Won
2012	"El Malo"	Tropical Airplay Song of the Year	Won
2012	14 + 14	Tropical Album of the Year	Nominated
2012	Aventura	Tropical Albums Artist of the Year, Duo or Group	Won
2012	Aventura	Tropical Songs Artist of the Year, Duo or Group	Won
2013	Aventura	Tropical Albums Artist of the Year, Duo or Group	Won
2016	Aventura	Tropical Albums Artist of the Year, Duo or Group	Nominated
2016	Sólo Para Mujeres	Tropical Album of the Year	Nominated
2017	Aventura	Tropical Albums Artist of the Year, Duo or Group	Nominated
2017	Todavía Me Amas: Lo Mejor de Aventura	Tropical Album of the Year	Nominated
2019	Aventura	Duo/Group Top Latin Albums Artist of the Year	Nominated
2019	Aventura	Tropical Duo/Group of the Year	Won
2020	Aventura	Top Latin Albums Artist of the Year, Duo or Group	Nominated
2020	Aventura	Tropical Duo/Group of the Year	Won
2020	“Inmortal”	Tropical Song of the Year	Nominated
2021	Aventura	Duo/Group Top Latin Albums Artist of the Year	Nominated
2021	Aventura	Tropical Duo/Group of the Year	Won
2022	Aventura	Duo/Group Hot Latin Songs Artist of the Year	Nominated
2022	Aventura	Top Latin Albums Artist of the Year, Duo/Group	Nominated
2022	Aventura	Tropical Artist of the Year, Duo or Group	Won
2022	"Volví"	Hot Latin Song of the Year, Vocal Event	Nominated
2022	"Volví"	Airplay Song of the Year	Nominated
2022	"Volví"	Tropical Song of the Year	Won
2022	"Volví"	Latin Rhythm Song of the Year	Nominated
2023	Aventura	Top Latin Albums Artist of the Year, Duo/Group	Nominated
2023	Aventura	Tropical Artist of the Year, Duo or Group	Won
2024	Aventura	Top Latin Albums Artist of the Year, Duo/Group	Nominated
2024	Aventura	Tropical Artist of the Year, Duo or Group	Won
2024	Cerrando Ciclos	Tour of the Year	Nominated
2024	Generation Next	Tropical Album of the Year	Nominated
2025	Aventura	Tour of the Year	Nominated
2025	Aventura	Top Latin Albums Artist of the Year, Duo/Group	Nominated
2025	Aventura	Tropical Artist of the Year, Duo or Group	Won
2026	Aventura	Top Latin Albums Artist of the Year, Duo/Group	Nominated
2026	Aventura	Tropical Artist of the Year, Duo or Group	Won

== Billboard Music Awards ==
Year	Nominee / work	Award	Result
2022	"Volví"	Top Latin Song	Nominated

== Heat Latin Music Awards ==
Year	Nominee / work	Award	Result
2022	"Volví"	Best Video	Nominated

== Latin American Music Awards ==
Year	Nominee / work	Award	Result
2019	"Inmortal"	Favorite Tropical Song	Nominated
2022	Aventura	Favorite Duo or Group	Won
2022	Aventura	Favorite Duo or Group	Nominated
2022	Aventura	Favorite Tour	Nominated
2022	"Volví"	Collaboration of the Year	Nominated
2022	"Volví"	Favorite Tropical Song	Won

== Latin Grammy Awards ==
Despite Aventura's success with multiple nominations and wins in other award shows, they have never won a Grammy together.

Year	Nominee / work	Award	Result
2007	K.O.B. Live	Best Contemporary Tropical Album	Nominated
2022	"Volví"	Best Urban Fusion/Performance	Nominated

== Premios Juventud ==
Year	Nominee / work	Award	Result
2004	"Dos Locos"	Best Re-Mix	Nominated
2004	"Obsesión"	Best Re-Mix	Nominated
2004	Love & Hate	I Die Without That CD	Nominated
2005	Aventura	Favorite Tropical Artist	Nominated
2006	Aventura	Favorite Tropical Artist	Won
2006	"Ella y Yo"	The Perfect Combo	Nominated
2007	Aventura	Voice of the Moment	Nominated
2007	Aventura	Favorite Tropical Artist	Won
2008	Aventura	Voice of the Moment	Won
2008	Aventura	Favorite Tropical Artist	Won
2008	Aventura	My Favorite Concert	Won
2008	"Un Beso"	My Favorite Ringtone	Nominated
2009	Aventura	Voice of the Moment	Nominated
2009	Aventura	Favorite Tropical Artist	Won
2009	Enrique Iglesias with Aventura	My Favorite Concert	Won
2010	Aventura	Favorite Tropical Artist	Won
2010	Aventura	My Favorite Concert	Nominated
2010	Aventura	Voice of the Moment	Nominated
2010	"Dile al Amor"	Catchiest Tune	Won
2010	"Dile al Amor"	My Ringtone	Nominated
2010	"Dile al Amor"	My favorite Video	Nominated
2010	"Dile al Amor"	Best Ballad	Nominated
2010	"All Up to You"	The Perfect Combination	Nominated
2010	The Last	CD To Die For	Won
2011	Aventura	Favorite Tropical Artist	Won
2022	"Volví"	The Perfect Mix	Nominated

== Premio Lo Nuestro ==
Year	Nominee / work	Award	Result
2004	Aventura	Best Salsa Performance - Tropical	Nominated
2005	Aventura	Group or Duo of the Year	Won
2005	Aventura	Tropical Traditional Artist of the Year	Won
2005	Love & Hate	Album of the Year	Nominated
2006	Aventura	Group or Duo of the Year	Won
2006	Aventura	Traditional Artist of the Year	Nominated
2007	Aventura	Tropical Group or Duo of the Year	Won
2007	Aventura	Traditional Artist of the Year	Won
2008	Aventura	Tropical Group or Duo of the Year	Won
2008	Aventura	Tropical Traditional Artist of the Year	Won
2008	"Mi Corazoncito"	Tropical Song of the Year	Won
2008	"Los Infieles"	Tropical Song of the Year	Nominated
2008	K.O.B. Live	Tropical Album of the Year	Won
2009	Aventura	Tropical Group or Duo of the Year	Won
2009	Aventura	Tropical Traditional Artist of the Year	Won
2009	"El Perdedor"	Tropical Song of the Year	Won
2009	Kings of Bachata: Sold Out at Madison Square Garden	Tropical Album of the Year	Won
2010	Aventura	Artist of the Year	Won
2010	Aventura	Best Group or Duo	Won
2010	Aventura	Tropical Traditional Artist of the Year	Won
2010	"All Up 2 You"	Collaboration of the Year	Nominated
2010	"All Up 2 You"	Urban Song of the Year	Nominated
2010	"Por un Segundo"	Tropical Song of the Year	Won
2010	The Last	Tropical Album of the Year	Won
2011	Aventura	Tropical Group or Duo of the Year	Won
2011	Aventura	Tropical Traditional Artist of the Year	Won
2011	Aventura	Video Artist of the Year	Nominated
2020	"Inmortal"	Tropical Song of the Year	Won
2022	"Volví"	Perfect Mix of The Year	Won
2025	Aventura	Tour of the Year	Won

== Premios Tu Música Urbano ==
Year	Nominee / work	Award	Result
2022	"Volví"	Collaboration of the Year	Nominated
