= Drama y Luz =

Studio album by Maná
- Released: April 12, 2011
- Recorded: May 18, 2010 – January 29, 2011
- Studios: Chamán (Guadalajara, Mexico); Ocean (Burbank); Hit Factory Criteria (Miami); Casa Dos Cisnes (Puerto Vallarta); Henson (Los Angeles); NRG (Los Angeles); Ocean Way (Los Angeles); Conway (Los Angeles); Steak House (Los Angeles); Oigo (Guadalajara); Junk/OM Studio (Brazil)
- Genres: Latin rock Pop rock
- Length: 56:46
- Label: WEA Latina
- Producers: Fher Olvera & Alex González

Maná chronology
Arde el Cielo (2008)	Drama y Luz (2011)	Exiliados en la Bahía: Lo Mejor de Maná (2012)

Alternative covers
- Deluxe Edition CD/DVD cover

Singles from Drama y Luz
- 1. "Lluvia al Corazón" Released: March 10, 2011; 2. "Amor Clandestino" Released: June 6, 2011; 3. "El Verdadero Amor Perdona" Released: September 5, 2011; 4. "Mi Reina del Dolor" Released: January 17, 2012

Drama y Luz (English: "Drama and Light") is the eighth studio album released by the Mexican Latin pop/Rock en Español band Maná. This album was released in three formats CD, CD with DVD, and 12" LP vinyl record. The album was released on April 12, 2011, after a long wait of 5 years since their last studio album Amar es Combatir. The first single off the album is "Lluvia al Corazón", released on March 10, 2011. The song debuted at number one on the U.S. Billboard Hot Latin Tracks. and the album made its debut at number 5 in the Billboard 200 selling 47,000 copies during its first week.

== Track listing ==
CD & LP vinyl record
No.	Title	Writer(s)	Length
1.	"Lluvia al Corazón (Rain to the Heart)"	Sergio Vallin, Fher Olvera	4:09
2.	"Amor Clandestino (Clandestine Love)"	Fher Olvera	4:52
3.	"Mi Reina del Dolor (My Queen of Pain)"	Sergio Vallin, Fher Olvera	4:06
4.	"El Espejo (The Mirror)"	Fher Olvera	5:23
5.	"Sor María (Sister María)"	Sergio Vallin, Fher Olvera	5:03
6.	"Vuela Libre Paloma (Fly Free Dove)"	Fher Olvera	5:25
7.	"No Te Rindas (Don't Give Up)"	Fher Olvera	5:04
8.	"Latinoamérica (Latinamerica)"	Alex González	5:31
9.	"El Dragón (The Dragon)"	Sergio Vallin, Fher Olvera	4:47
10.	"El Verdadero Amor Perdona (The Real Love Forgives)"	Fher Olvera	4:41
11.	"Envenéname (Poison Me)"	Fher Olvera, Alex González	3:37
12.	"No Te Rindas (Versión Alternativa) [Don't Give Up] {Alternative Version}"	Fher Olvera	4:14

iTunes Deluxe Version
No.	Title	Writer(s)	Length
13.	"Mi Corazón No Sabe Olvidar (Bonus Track)"	Fher Olvera	4:46
14.	"Contra Todo (Bonus Track)"	Fher Olvera, Alex González	3:48

Walmart Limited Edition
No.	Title	Writer(s)	Length
13.	"Lluvia al Corazón (Live Version)"	Fher Olvera, Sergio Vallin	4:10
14.	"Labios Compartidos (Live Version)"	Fher Olvera	4:51
15.	"Eres Mi Religion (Live Version)"	Fher Olvera	5:32

Deluxe Edition CD
No.	Title	Writer(s)	Length
13.	"Mi Corazón No Sabe Olvidar"	Fher Olvera	4:46
14.	"Contra Todo"	Fher Olvera, Alex González	3:48
15.	"Lluvia al Corazón (Live Version)"	Fher Olvera	4:10
16.	"El Verdadero Amor Perdona (Bachata Version) (feat. Prince Royce)"	Fher Olvera	3:57

== DVD ==
The CD/DVD edition is produced by Time Bender, produced by "Toiz" Rodriguez and directed by Iván López Barba and Rubén R. Bañuelos.

CD/DVD
No.	Title	Length
1.	"Menu"	0:59
2.	"The Making of the album"	4:32
3.	"El Espejo"	5:10
4.	"El Dragón"	2:39
5.	"Amor Clandestino"	4:14
6.	"Lluvia al Corazón"	3:27
7.	"Vuela Libre Paloma"	5:41
8.	"No Te Rindas"	9:06
9.	"Latinoamérica"	5:49
10.	"Sor María"	6:27
11.	"Credits"	5:07

Deluxe Edition CD/DVD
No.	Title	Length
1.	"Lluvia al Corazón - Music Video"
2.	"Amor Clandestino - Music Video"
3.	"Making El Tour"
4.	"EPK Drama y Luz"

== Personnel (band) ==
- Fher Olvera – main vocals, acoustic & electric guitars, coros, programming,
- Alex González – drums, vocals, coros, programming, keyboards
- Sergio Vallín – acoustic & electric guitars, coros, orchestral arrangements, string arrangements, keyboards, programming
- Juan Diego Calleros – bass

=== Additional personnel ===
- GusOrozco – guitar & bass arrangements, programming, keyboards
- Fernando "Psycho" Vallín – low arrangements, electric bass
- Fernando "El Bueno" Quintana – guitar & bass arrangements, string arrangements, coros, keyboards

- Héctor Quintana – coros
- Carlos Munguía – coros
- Luis Conte – percussions
- Jeff Babko – keyboards
- Benjamin "Jamie" Muhoberac – keyboards
- Tommy Morgan – harmonica
- Suzie Katayama – orchestra director
- Charlie Bisharat – master concert violinist
- Jackie Brand – violin
- Mario de León – violin
- Tammy Hatwan – violin
- Gerry Hilera – violin
- Tereza Stanislav – violin
- Josefina Vergara – violin
- Ken Yerke – violin
- Matt Funes – viola
- Jorge Moraga – viola
- Steve Richards – cello
- Rudy Stein – cello
- Nico Abondolo – contrabass
- David Parmeter – contrabass
- Chris Bleth – oboe
- Joe Meyer – French horn
- Steve Becknell – French horn
- Alan Kaplan – trombone
- Toño Márquez – lyrical advisor
- Augusto Chacón – copy editor
- José Quintana – vocal direction

== Charts ==
=== Weekly charts ===
Chart (2011–2012)	Peak position
Chilean Albums Charts	1
German Albums (Offizielle Top 100)	71
Mexican Albums (Top 100 Mexico)	1
Spanish Albums (Promusicae)	1
Swiss Albums (Schweizer Hitparade)	3
Peruan Albums Charts	1
Uruguayan Albums (CUD)	12
US Billboard 200	5
US Top Latin Albums (Billboard)	1
US Latin Pop Albums (Billboard)	1
US Top Rock Albums (Billboard)	3
Venezuelan Albums (Recordland)	1

=== Year-end charts ===
Year-end chart performance for Drama y Luz
Chart (2011)	Position
Spanish Albums (PROMUSICAE)	9
US Top Latin Albums (Billboard)	3
US Top Rock Albums (Billboard)	51
Chart (2012)	Position
US Top Latin Albums (Billboard)	8

=== Singles ===
Year	Song	Chart	Peak position
2011	"Lluvia al Corazón"	Spain PROMUSICAE Top 50 Singles	13
2011	"Lluvia al Corazón"	U.S. Billboard Hot Latin Tracks	1
2011	"Lluvia al Corazón"	U.S. Billboard Latin Pop Airplay	1
2011	"Lluvia al Corazón"	U.S. Billboard Tropical Songs	4
2011	"Amor Clandestino"	U.S. Billboard Hot Latin Tracks	1
2011	"Amor Clandestino"	U.S. Billboard Latin Pop Airplay	1
2011	"Amor Clandestino"	U.S. Billboard Tropical Songs	1
2011	"El Verdadero Amor Perdona"	U.S. Billboard Hot Latin Tracks	1
2011	"El Verdadero Amor Perdona"	U.S. Billboard Latin Pop Airplay	1
2011	"El Verdadero Amor Perdona"	U.S. Billboard Tropical Songs	1

== Certifications ==
Region	Certification	Certified units/sales
Argentina (CAPIF)	Platinum	40,000^{^}
Mexico (AMPROFON)	Platinum+Gold	90,000^{^}
Spain (Promusicae)	Platinum	60,000^{^}
United States (RIAA)	5× Platinum (Latin)	300,000^{‡}
^{^} Shipments figures based on certification alone.^{‡} Sales+streaming figures based on certification alone.

== Awards ==
Latin Grammy Award

- 2011: Best Rock Album
- 2011: Best Engineered Album

Grammy Awards

- 2012: Best Latin Pop, Rock or Urban Album

Los Premios Telehit

- Los Premios Telehit 2011: Best Mexican Band International

== See also ==
- Drama y Luz World Tour
- List of number-one Billboard Latin Albums from the 2010s
- List of number-one albums of 2011 (Spain)
