= Premio Lo Nuestro 2007 =

Latin Music awards show

19th Lo Nuestro Awards
- Date: February 22, 2007
- Location: American Airlines Arena
- Country: United States
- Hosted by: Cristián de la Fuente; Ninel Conde

Television/radio coverage
- Network: Univision

Premio Lo Nuestro 2007 was held on Thursday, February 22, 2007, at the American Airlines Arena in Miami, Florida. It was broadcast live by Univision Network. The nominees were announced on December 12, 2006, during a press conference televised live on the Univision Network morning show Despierta América!.

== Host ==
- Cristián de la Fuente
- Ninel Conde

== Performers ==
Menudo

== Presenters ==
- Alejandra Guzman
- Alicia Machado
- Alondra
- Anais
- Andres Cepeda
- Armando Araiza
- Babasonicos
- Don Dinero
- Galilea Montijo
- Guy Ecker
- Jaqueline Bracamontes
- Jennifer Lopez
- Julieta Venegas
- Kika Edgar
- Laisha Wilkins
- Lili Estefan
- la Quinta Estacion
- Mana
- Rafael Mercadante
- Rakim & Ken-Y
- Victor Noriega

== Special awards ==
=== Premio Lo Nuestro a la Excelencia (Lifetime Achievement Award) ===
- Juan Luis Guerra

== Pop ==
=== Album of the Year ===
1. Adentro, Ricardo Arjona
2. Días Felices, Cristian Castro
3. El Sexto Sentido: Re+Loaded, Thalía
4. Mañana, Sin Bandera
5. Nuestro Amor, RBD

=== Male Artist ===
1. Chayanne
2. Cristian Castro
3. Luis Fonsi
4. Ricardo Arjona

=== Female Artist ===
1. Anaís
2. Julieta Venegas
3. Laura Pausini
4. Shakira

=== Group or Duo ===
1. La 5ª Estación
2. RBD
3. Reik
4. Sin Bandera

=== Song of the Year ===
1. Amor Eterno, Cristian Castro
2. No, no, no, Thalía & Romeo Santos of Aventura
3. Por Una Mujer, Luis Fonsi
4. Que Me Alcance la Vida, Sin Bandera
5. Te Echo de Menos, Chayanne

=== Breakout Artist or Group of the Year ===
1. Anaís
2. Camila
3. Chelo
4. Yuridia

== Rock ==
=== Album of the Year ===
1. Amar es Combatir, Maná
2. Anoche, Babasónicos
3. Indeleble, Alejandra Guzmán
4. Pecado Original, Enanitos Verdes
5. Vida de Perros, Los Bunkers

=== Artist of the Year ===
1. Alejandra Guzmán
2. Babasónicos
3. Juanes
4. Maná

=== Song of the Year ===
1. Carismático, Babasónicos
2. Labios Compartidos, Maná
3. Lo Que Me Gusta a Mí, Juanes
4. Mariposas, Enanitos Verdes
5. Volverte a Amar, Alejandra Guzmán

== Tropical ==
=== Album of the Year ===
1. Decisión Unánime, Víctor Manuelle
2. Éxitos y Más, Monchy y Alexandra
3. I Love Salsa! - Edición Especial, N'Klabe
4. Sigo Siendo Yo, Marc Anthony
5. Soy Diferente, India

=== Male Artist of the Year ===
1. Andy Andy
2. Fonseca
3. Marc Anthony
4. Tito Nieves

=== Female Artist of the Year ===
1. Gisselle
2. India
3. Milly Quezada
4. Olga Tañón

=== Group or Duo of the Year ===
1. Aventura
2. India & Cheka
3. Monchy y Alexandra
4. N'Klabe & Víctor Manuelle
5. N'Klabe & Julio Voltio

=== Song of the Year ===
1. Tu Amor Me Hace Bien, Marc Anthony
2. Amor de Una Noche, N'Klabe with Voltio
3. No Es Una Novela, Monchy y Alexandra
4. Nuestro Amor Se Ha Vuelto Ayer, Víctor Manuelle
5. Te Mando Flores, Fonseca

=== Merengue Artist of the Year ===
1. Grupo Manía
2. Limi-T 21
3. Olga Tañón
4. Chichi Peralta

=== Tropical Salsa Artist of the Year ===
1. Marc Anthony
2. Michael Stuart
3. Tito Nieves
4. Víctor Manuelle

=== Tropical Traditional Artist of the Year ===
1. Andy Andy
2. Aventura
3. Fonseca
4. Monchy y Alexandra

=== New Soloist or Group of the Year ===
1. Fonseca
2. Marlon
3. Orlando Conga

== Regional Mexican Music ==
=== Album of the Year ===
1. Algo de Mi, Conjunto Primavera
2. Aliado del Tiempo, Mariano Barba
3. Borrón y Cuenta Nueva, Grupo Montéz de Durango
4. Historias que Contar, Los Tigres del Norte
5. Los Super Éxitos, Grupo Montéz de Durango

=== Male Artist of the Year ===
1. El Chapo de Sinaloa
2. Joan Sebastian
3. Mariano Barba
4. Sergio Vega

=== Female Artist of the Year ===
1. Alicia Villarreal
2. Diana Reyes
3. Graciela Beltrán
4. Jenni Rivera

=== Group or Duo of the Year ===
1. Conjunto Primavera
2. Grupo Montéz de Durango
3. Intocable
4. Los Tigres del Norte

=== Song of the Year ===
1. Aliado del Tiempo, Mariano Barba
2. Algo de Mí, Conjunto Primavera
3. Alguien te Va a Hacer Llorar, Intocable
4. De Contrabando, Jenni Rivera
5. Lagrimillas Tontas, Grupo Montéz de Durango

=== Banda Artist of the Year ===
1. Mariano Barba
2. Beto y sus Canarios
3. Jenni Rivera
4. Joan Sebastian

=== Duranguense Artist of the Year ===
1. Alacranes Musical
2. Grupo Montéz de Durango
3. K-Paz de la Sierra
4. Patrulla 81

=== Grupera Artist of the Year ===
1. Bronco - El Gigante De América
2. Grupo Bryndis
3. Los Temerarios
4. Victor Garcia

=== Norteño Artist of the Year ===
1. Conjunto Primavera
2. Intocable
3. Los Huracanes del Norte
4. Los Tigres del Norte

=== Ranchera Artist of the Year ===
1. Alicia Villarreal
2. Pablo Montero
3. Pepe Aguilar
4. Vicente Fernández

=== Tejano Artist of the Year ===
1. Bobby Pulido
2. Costumbre
3. Jimmy González

=== New Soloist or Group of the Year ===
1. Los Creadorez del Pasito Duranguense de Alfredo Ramírez
2. Los Cuen's de Sinaloa
3. Chelín Ortiz

== Urban ==
=== Album of the Year ===
1. Barrio Fino en Directo, Daddy Yankee
2. Flashback, Ivy Queen
3. Masterpriece, R.K.M & Ken-Y
4. Pa'l Mundo: Deluxe Edition, Wisin & Yandel
5. Top of the Line, Tito El Bambino

=== Artist of the Year ===
1. Daddy Yankee
2. Don Omar
3. Tito El Bambino
4. Wisin & Yandel

=== Song of the Year ===
1. Caile, Tito El Bambino
2. Down, R.K.M & Ken-Y
3. Llamé Pa' Verte, Wisin & Yandel
4. Machucando, Daddy Yankee
5. Rompe, Daddy Yankee

== Video of the Year ==
1. Angelito, Don Omar
2. Labios Compartidos, Maná
3. Todos Me Miran, Gloria Trevi
4. Me voy, Julieta Venegas
5. Mojado, Ricardo Arjona with Intocable
6. Ni Freud Ni Tu Mama, Belinda
