= Ángel de Amor =

Single by Maná

from the album Revolución de Amor
- Released: July 22, 2002
- Recorded: February–May 2002
- Genre: Latin, Rock en Español, Pop rock
- Length: 4:57
- Label: WEA Latina
- Composer: Fher Olvera · Alex González
- Lyricist: Fher Olvera
- Producer: Fher Olvera · Alex González

Maná singles chronology
"Corazón Espinado" (2000)	"Ángel de Amor" (2002)	"Eres Mi Religión" (2003)

"Ángel de Amor" (English: Angel of Love) is the first radio single and Eleventh track from Maná's sixth studio album, Revolución de Amor (2002). On the week of August 3, 2002 the song debuted at number nine on the U.S. Billboard Hot Latin Tracks and after five weeks later on September 7, 2002, it reach to its highest point at the number six spot for only one week. It would stay for a total of 22 weeks.

== Charts ==
Chart (2003)	Peak position
US Hot Latin Songs (Billboard)	6
US Latin Pop Airplay (Billboard)	2
US Latin Tropical/Salsa Airplay (Billboard)	5

The video is about a trapped girl who wants to be freed.
