= 2007 World Music Awards =

19th award event

The 2007 World Music Awards (19th annual World Music Awards) was held November 4, 2007 in Monaco for the first time in several years. Awards were presented based on record sales rather than any vote. All proceeds from the evening were donated to the construction of a hospital in Darfur. The show was hosted by Julian McMahon. Performers included Nightwish, Akon, Amr Diab, Avril Lavigne, Cascada, Céline Dion, Ciara, Laura Pausini, Maná and Rihanna.

== Legend Awards ==
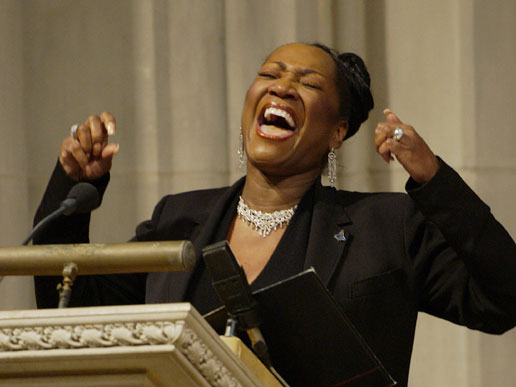
Patti LaBelle singing at the memorial service for the crew of the Space Shuttle Columbia, February 6, 2003.

- Outstanding contribution to R & B: Patti LaBelle
  - Announcing Patti LaBelle's Legend Award for outstanding contribution to R&B music, Ciara named Patti as "the High Priestess of Good Vibrations." Patti's benevolent attitude was best summed up with her own words. "It's not about making money, because I don’t need money, but I need to sing."
- Outstanding Contribution to Music: Céline Dion
  - Prince Albert II, presenting Céline Dion's Legend Award, praised the Canadian artist. According to the Prince, "Her contribution to music is as potent as her courageous voice."

== Entertainer of the year ==
- Rihanna

== Winners ==
=== DJ ===
- World's Best-Selling DJ: David Guetta

=== Internet ===
- World's Best-Selling Internet Artist: Akon

=== Latin ===
- World's Best-Selling Latin Group: Maná

=== New ===
- Best-Selling New Artist: Mika

=== Pop ===
- World's Best-Selling Pop Female Artist: Rihanna
- World's Best-Selling Pop Male Artist: Justin Timberlake

=== Pop Rock ===
- World's Best-Selling Pop Rock Female Artist: Avril Lavigne
- World's Best-Selling Pop Rock Male Artist: Mika

=== Rap Hip Hop ===
- World's Best-Selling Rap Hip Hop Artist: 50 Cent

=== R&B ===
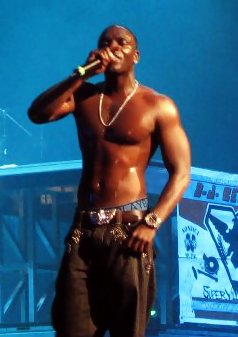
Akon Charlotte, North Carolina, May 12, 2007.

- World's Best-Selling R&B Female Artist: Ciara
- World's Best-Selling R&B Male Artist: Akon

=== Regional Awards ===
- Best-Selling African Artist: Akon
- Best-Selling American Artist: Justin Timberlake
- Best-Selling Australian Artist: Silverchair
- Best-Selling British Artist: Mika
- Best-Selling Canadian Artist: Avril Lavigne
- Best-Selling Chinese Artist: Jay Chou
- Best-Selling Dutch Artist: Within Temptation
- Best-Selling French Artist: Christophe Willem
- Best-Selling German Artist: Cascada
- Best-Selling Irish Group: U2
- Best-Selling Italian Artist: Laura Pausini
- Best-Selling Latin American Artist: Maná
- Best-Selling Middle Eastern Artist: Amr Diab
- Best-Selling Russian Artist: Serebro
- Best-Selling Scandinavian Artist: Nightwish
- Best-Selling Spanish Artist: Miguel Bosé

== Top Award Winners ==
- Akon won three awards: Best-Selling R&B Male Artist, Best-Selling African Artist and Best-Selling Internet Artist
- Mika won three awards: Best-Selling British Artist, Best-Selling New Artist and Best-Selling Pop/Rock Male Artist.
- Rihanna won two awards: Entertainer of the Year and Best-Selling Pop Female Artist
- Avril Lavigne won two awards: Best-Selling Pop Rock Female Artist and Best-Selling Canadian Artist.
- Justin Timberlake won two awards: World's Best-Selling Pop Male Artist and Best-Selling American Artist.
- Maná won two awards: World's Best-Selling Latin Group and Best-Selling Latin American Artist.

== Official sponsor ==
This year's World Music Awards was sponsored by English fashion brand Belstaff, one of the best known companies in its field with many products appearing in Hollywood blockbuster movies including Mission: Impossible III, Ocean's Twelve and The Departed.
