= Hipódromo de Los Andes =

Horse racing track in Bogotá, Colombia

Coordinates: 4.8486°N 74.0361°W

Hipódromo De Los Andes
- Interactive map of Hipódromo De Los Andes
- Location: Bogotá, Colombia

The Hipódromo De Los Andes is a horse racing track located in the north of Bogotá, Colombia. It has a capacity for 20,000 people for concerts.

Nowadays, it is used only for events. Daddy Yankee and Don Omar are some of the singers that have performed in there. Mana is scheduled to perform in the venue on March 3, 2012.
