= El Verdadero Amor Perdona =

Single by Maná featuring Prince Royce

from the album Drama y Luz
- Released: September 5, 2011
- Genre: Pop rock
- Length: 4:41
- Label: Warner/WEA International
- Songwriter: Fher Olvera
- Producers: Fher Olvera & Alex González

Maná singles chronology
"Amor Clandestino" (2011)	"El Verdadero Amor Perdona" (2011)	"Mi Reina del Dolor" (2012)

Prince Royce singles chronology
"Addicted" (2011)	"El Verdadero Amor Perdona (Bachata version)" (2011)	"Las Cosas Pequeñas" (2012)

"El Verdadero Amor Perdona" (English: "True Love Forgives") is the third single from Mexican Latin pop/Rock en Español band Maná's eighth studio album Drama y Luz. The song also features a bachata duet with Prince Royce on their Deluxe Edition of Drama y Luz album. The song is produced by Fher Olvera & Alex González and won for Collaboration of the Year and Rock/Alternative Song of the Year at the Premio Lo Nuestro 2013.

== Music video ==
The music video for the song, which was directed by Pablo Croce and shoot at the El Charco del Ingenio botanical a botanical garden just outside Guanajuato, Mexico. This video features a DINA S.A. bus (probably a coach).

== Charts ==
=== Weekly charts ===
Chart (2011–12)	Peak position
Mexican Airplay Chart (Billboard International)	1
Spain (Promusicae)	35
US Billboard Hot 100	100
US Hot Latin Songs (Billboard)	1
US Latin Pop Airplay (Billboard)	1
US Tropical Airplay (Billboard)	1
Venezuela Top Latino (Record Report)	19

=== Year-end charts ===
Chart (2012)	Position
US Hot Latin Songs (Billboard)	9

=== Decade-end charts ===
Chart (2010–2019)	Position
US Hot Latin Songs (Billboard)	45

== Certifications ==
Region	Certification	Certified units/sales
United States (RIAA)	2× Platinum (Latin)	120,000^{‡}
^{‡} Sales+streaming figures based on certification alone.

== See also ==
- List of number-one Billboard Top Latin Songs of 2011
- List of Billboard number-one Latin songs of 2012
