= Revolución de Amor =

Studio album by Maná
- Released: August 20, 2002
- Recorded: February–May 2002
- Studios: Jim Henson (Hollywood); Forster Sound (Hollywood); Rumbo (Los Angeles); Conway (Los Angeles); Fantasy (Berkeley); Puerta Azul (Puerto Vallarta, Mexico)
- Genre: Rock en Español
- Length: 59:57
- Language: Spanish
- Label: WEA Latina
- Producer: Fher Olvera · Alex González

Maná chronology
Sólo Para Fanáticos (2001)	Revolución de Amor (2002)	100% Maná (2001)

European cover

Singles from Revolución de Amor
- 1. "Ángel de Amor" Released: July 22, 2002; 2. "Eres Mi Religión" Released: October 7, 2002; 3. "Mariposa Traicionera" Released: March 3, 2003; 4. "Justicia Tierra Y Libertad" Released: April 14, 2003; 5. "Sábanas Frías (featuring Rubén Blades)" Released: June 9, 2003

Professional ratings
Review scores
Source	Rating
Allmusic	4/5 stars

Revolución de Amor (Revolution of Love) is the sixth and sixteenth overall studio album by Mexican rock band Maná, released by WEA Latina on August 20, 2002. Allmusic considers it one of their strongest and most consistent albums. Critics of the band deride it for being too slick and polished, with an "arena rock" aura, but others consider it to have some of their strongest writing. The album gave Maná their fourth Grammy.

The songs have various influences; from Mexican elements on "Mariposa Traicionera" to a salsa-influenced groove on "No Voy A Ser Tu Esclavo" and "Sabanas Frías." "Ay, Doctor" is infused with the sounds of African ska. The album features guest appearances from Carlos Santana, Rubén Blades and Asdrubal Sierra from Ozomatli.

== Track listing ==
No.	Title	Writer(s)	Length
1.	"Justicia, Tierra y Libertad" (Justice, Earth & Freedom) (featuring Carlos Santana)	Fher Olvera	5:16
2.	"Ay, Doctor" (Oh, Doctor)	Fher Olvera · Álex González	5:28
3.	"Fe" (Faith)	Álex González	4:40
4.	"Sábanas Frías" (Cold Sheets) (featuring Rubén Blades)	Fher Olvera	5:19
5.	"Pobre Juan" (Poor Juan)	Fher Olvera	5:12
6.	"¿Por Qué Te Vas?" (Why Are You Leaving?)	Sergio Vallín	4:42
7.	"Mariposa Traicionera" (Treacherous Butterfly)	Fher Olvera	4:22
8.	"Sin Tu Cariño" (Without Your Care)	Álex González	4:58
9.	"Eres Mi Religión" (You're My Religion)	Fher Olvera	5:28
10.	"No Voy a Ser Tu Esclavo" (I'm Not Going To Be Your Slave) (featuring Asdrubal Sierra of Ozomatli)	Fher Olvera · Sergio Vallin	4:25
11.	"Ángel de Amor" (Angel of Love)	Fher Olvera · Álex González	4:57
12.	"Nada Que Perder" (Nothing to Lose)	Álex González	5:10

== Revolución de Amor: 2003 Tour Edition ==
Revolución de Amor: 2003 Tour Edition this is a special re-release of Revolución de Amor from the 2003 Revolución de Amor Tour in Spain, released on July 19, 2005. "Eres Mi Religión" features Italian rock singer Zucchero. The CD came bundled with a special DVD features that include music videos, a documentary of the Zucchero recording session, and promotion of the Germany and France tours.

2003 Tour Edition
No.	Title	Length
1.	"Eres Mi Religión" (featuring Zucchero)	5:28
2.	"Justicia, Tierra Y Libertad" (featuring Carlos Santana)	5:16
3.	"Ay, Doctor"	5:28
4.	"Fe"	4:40
5.	"Sábanas Frías" (featuring Rubén Blades)	5:19
6.	"Pobre Juan"	5:12
7.	"¿Por Qué Te Vas?"	4:42
8.	"Mariposa Traicionera"	4:22
9.	"Sin Tu Cariño"	4:58
10.	"Eres Mi Religión"	5:28
11.	"No Voy a Ser Tu Esclavo" (featuring Asdrubal Sierra of Ozomatli)	4:25
12.	"Ángel de Amor"	4:57
13.	"Nada Que Perder"	5:10

=== DVD ===
- "Ángel De Amor" music video
- "Eres Mi Religión" music video
- "Mariposa Traicionera" music video
- Documentary of the Selva Negra foundation
- Recording session "Eres Mi Religión" with Zucchero
- Promotions of the Germany and France tour
- Photos galler

== Charts ==
Chart (2002)	Peak position
Argentine Albums (CAPIF)	1
Dominican Albums (Musicalia)	1
U.S. Billboard 200	22
U.S. Billboard Top Latin Albums	1
U.S. Billboard Latin Pop Albums	1
Uruguayan Albums (CUD)	1
Venezuelan Albums (Recordland)	3

== Sales and certifications ==
Region	Certification	Certified units/sales
Argentina (CAPIF)	3× Platinum	120,000^{^}
Brazil (Pro-Música Brasil)	Gold	50,000^{*}
Mexico (AMPROFON)	2× Platinum+Gold	375,000^{^}
Spain (Promusicae)	2× Platinum	200,000^{^}
United States (RIAA)	Gold	528,000
^{*} Sales figures based on certification alone.^{^} Shipments figures based on certification alone.
