= Lluvia al Corazón =

Single by Maná

from the album Drama y Luz
- Released: March 10, 2011
- Recorded: 2010
- Genre: Latin/Hard rock/Rock en Español
- Label: Warner/WEA International
- Composer: Fher Olvera · Sergio Vallín
- Lyricist: Fher Olvera
- Producer: Fher Olvera · Alex González

Maná singles chronology
"Arde el Cielo" (2008)	"Lluvia al Corazón" (2011)	"Amor Clandestino" (2011)

"Lluvia al Corazón" (English: "Rain to the Heart") is the first single from Mexican Latin pop/Rock en Español band Maná's eighth studio album Drama y Luz. The song is produced by Fher Olvera & Alex González. .

== Chart performance ==
The song became a number-one debut on the Hot Latin Songs and Latin Pop Songs chart.

=== Weekly charts ===
Chart (2011)	Peak position
Mexican Airplay Chart	1
Spain (Promusicae)	12
US Hot Latin Songs (Billboard)	1
US Latin Pop Airplay (Billboard)	1
US Tropical Airplay (Billboard)	4
Venezuela Airplay Chart	6

=== Year-end charts ===
Chart (2011)	Position
US Hot Latin Songs (Billboard)	16
