= Amor Clandestino =

Single by Maná

from the album Drama y Luz
- Released: June 6, 2011
- Recorded: 2010
- Genre: Latin/Soft Rock/Rock en Español
- Length: 4:52
- Label: Warner/WEA International
- Songwriter: Fher Olvera
- Producers: Fher Olvera & Alex González

Maná singles chronology
"Lluvia al Corazón" (2011)	"Amor Clandestino" (2011)	"El Verdadero Amor Perdona" (2011)

"Amor Clandestino" (English: "Clandestine Love") is the second single from Mexican Latin pop/Rock en Español band Maná's eighth studio album Drama y Luz. The song is produced by Fher Olvera & Alex González. The song reached number-one on the Hot Latin Songs chart. The song also reached number-one on the Mexican Airplay Charts according to Billboard International.

== Music video ==
The music video for the song, which was directed by Pablo Croce The video is divided into 3 acts which actors are the following, the guy called Paco Martinez Maldonado and the psychology called Estefania Arango.

== Charts ==
=== Weekly charts ===
Chart (2011)	Peak position
US Bubbling Under Hot 100 (Billboard)	22
US Hot Latin Songs (Billboard)	1
US Latin Pop Airplay (Billboard)	1

=== Year-end charts ===
Chart (2011)	Position
US Hot Latin Songs (Billboard)	30

== Certifications ==
Region	Certification	Certified units/sales
United States (RIAA)	4× Platinum (Latin)	240,000^{‡}
^{‡} Sales+streaming figures based on certification alone.
