= 2016 Latin Billboard Music Awards =

Annual American music awards ceremony

23rd Billboard Latin Music Awards
- Date: April 28, 2016
- Site: BankUnited Center; Coral Gables, Florida, U.S.

Television coverage
- Network: Telemundo

The 23rd annual Billboard Latin Music Awards which honor the most popular albums, songs, and performers in Latin music took place in Miami.

== Artist of the Year ==
- Enrique Iglesias
- Juan Gabriel
- Romeo Santos
- Nicky Jam

== Artist of the Year, New ==
- Ariel Camacho y Los Plebes del Rancho
- La Séptima Banda
- Banda Clave Nueva de Max Peraza
- Maluma

== Tour of the Year ==
- Enrique Iglesias & Pitbull
- Romeo Santos
- Juan Gabriel
- Ricardo Arjona

== Social Artist of the Year ==
- Enrique Iglesias
- Shakira
- Prince Royce
- Romeo Santos

== Crossover Artist of the Year ==
- Ed Sheeran
- Omi
- Justin Bieber
- The Weeknd

== Hot Latin Song of the Year ==
- Los Plebes del Rancho de Ariel Camacho – Te Metiste
- J Balvin – Ginza
- Nicky Jam feat. Enrique Iglesias – El Perdón
- Romeo Santos – Propuesta Indecente

== Hot Latin Song of the Year, Vocal Event ==
- Maná & Shakira – Mi Verdad
- Nicky Jam feat. Enrique Iglesias – El Perdón
- Farruko feat. Shaggy & Nicky Jam – Sunset
- Gente de Zona feat. Marc Anthony – La Gozadera

== Hot Latin Songs Artist of the Year, Male ==
- Enrique Iglesias
- J Balvin
- Nicky Jam
- Romeo Santos

== Hot Latin Songs Artist of the Year, Female ==
- Natalia Jimenez
- Jennifer Lopez
- Shakira
- Natti Natasha

== Hot Latin Songs Artist of the Year, Duo or Group ==
- Banda Sinaloense MS De Sergio Lizárraga
- Ariel Camacho y Los Plebes del Rancho
- Calibre 50
- Julion Alvarez y Su Norteno Banda

== Hot Latin Songs Label of the Year ==
- DEL
- Sony Music Latin
- Remex
- Universal Music Latin Entertainment

== Hot Latin Songs Imprint of the Year ==
- Capitol Latin
- DEL
- Fonovisa
- Sony Music Latin

== Airplay Song of the Year ==
- J Balvin – Ginza
- Nicky Jam feat. Enrique Iglesias – El Perdón
- Romeo Santos – Hilito
- Zion & Lennox – Pierdo La Cabeza

== Airplay Label of the Year ==
- DEL
- Sony Music Latin
- Universal Music Latin Entertainment
- Warner Latina

== Airplay Imprint of the Year ==
- Disa
- Capitol Latin
- Sony Music Latin
- Fonovisa

== Digital Song of the Year ==
- J Balvin – Ginza
- Gente de Zona feat. Marc Anthony – La Gozadera
- Nicky Jam & Enrique Iglesias – El Perdón
- J Balvin – Ay Vamos

== Streaming Song of the Year ==
- Banda Sinaloense MS de Sergio Lizárraga – Háblame de Ti
- Banda Sinaloense MS de Sergio Lizárraga – Mi Razón de Ser
- J Balvin – Ay Vamos
- Nicky Jam & Enrique Iglesias – El Perdón

== Top Latin Album of the Year ==
- Ricky Martin – A Quien Quiera Escuchar
- Juan Gabriel – Los Dúo
- Gerardo Ortiz – Hoy Más Fuerte
- Maná – Cama Incendiada

== Latin Compilation Album of the Year ==
- Varios/Various – 20 Bandazos de Oro: Puros Éxitos
- Varios/Various – De Puerto Rico Para El Mundo
- Varios/Various – Las Bandas Románticas de América 2016
- Varios/Various – Latin Hits 2016: Club Edition

== Top Latin Albums Artist of the Year, Male ==
- Gerardo Ortiz
- Joan Sebastian
- Juan Gabriel
- Ricky Martin

== Top Latin Albums Artist of the Year, Female ==
- Ana Gabriel
- Chiquis Rivera
- Selena
- Natalia Jiménez

== Top Latin Albums Artist of the Year, Duo or Group ==
- Maná
- Calibre 50
- Julión Álvarez y Su Norteño Banda
- Los Plebes del Rancho de Ariel Camacho

== Top Latin Albums Label of the Year ==
- Columbia
- Lizos
- Warner Latina
- Universal Music Latin Entertainment

== Top Latin Albums Imprint of the Year ==
- Musart
- Disa
- Fonovisa
- Sony Music Latin

== Latin Pop Song of the Year ==
- Christian Daniel – Ahora Que Te Vas
- Juanes – Juntos (Together)
- Ricky Martin feat.Yotuel – La Mordidita
- Maná & Shakira – Mi Verdad

== Latin Pop Songs Artist of the Year, Solo ==
- Christian Daniel
- Enrique Iglesias
- Juanes
- Ricky Martin

== Latin Pop Songs Artist of the Year, Duo or Group ==
- Chino & Nacho
- Maná
- Ha*Ash
- Jesse & Joy

== Latin Pop Airplay Label of the Year ==
- Summa
- Sony Music Latin
- Universal Music Latin Entertainment
- Warner Latina

== Latin Pop Airplay Imprint of the Year ==
- Capitol Latin
- Sony Music Latin
- Universal Music Latino
- Warner Latina

== Latin Pop Album of the Year ==
- Ricky Martin – A Quien Quiera Escuchar
- Juan Gabriel – Los Dúo
- Juan Gabriel – Mis Número 1 ... 40 Aniversario
- Maná – Cama Incendiada

== Latin Pop Albums Artist of the Year, Solo ==
- Marco Antonio Solís
- Juan Gabriel
- Ricky Martin
- Selena

== Latin Pop Albums Artist of the Year, Duo or Group ==
- Maná
- Grupo Nueva Vida
- Il Divo
- Jesse & Joy

== Latin Pop Albums Label of the Year ==
- Columbia
- Sony Music Latin
- Universal Music Latin Entertainment
- Warner Latina

== Latin Pop Albums Imprint of the Year ==
- Universal Music Latino
- Fonovisa
- Sony Music Latin
- Warner Latina

== Tropical Song of the Year ==
- Gente de Zona feat. Marc Anthony – La Gozadera
- Victor Manuelle – No Quería Engañarte
- Romeo Santos – Hilito
- Romeo Santos feat. Marc Anthony – Yo También

== Tropical Songs Artist of the Year, Solo ==
- Prince Royce
- Marc Anthony
- Victor Manuelle
- Romeo Santos

== Tropical Songs Artist of the Year, Duo or Group ==
- ChocQuibTown
- Ilegales
- Gente de Zona
- Grupo Manía

== Tropical Songs Airplay Label of the Year ==
- Pina
- Kiyavi
- Sony Music Latin
- Top Stop

== Tropical Songs Airplay Imprint of the Year ==
- Kiyavi
- Sony Music Latin
- Top Stop
- Pina

== Tropical Album of the Year ==
- Aventura – Sólo Para Mujeres
- Buena Vista Social Club – Lost and Found
- Victor Manuelle – Que Suenen Los Tambores
- Gilberto Santa Rosa – Necesito Un Bolero

== Tropical Albums Artist of the Year, Solo ==
- Gilberto Santa Rosa
- Marc Anthony
- Romeo Santos
- Victor Manuelle

== Tropical Albums Artist of the Year, Duo or Group ==
- Aventura
- Buena Vista Social Club
- Pirulo y La Tribu
- El Gran Combo de Puerto Rico

== Sello Discográfico del Año, “Tropical Albums” Tropical Albums Label of the Year ==
- Warner Bros.
- Planet Records
- Sony Music Latin
- Universal Music Latin Entertainment

== Tropical Albums Imprint of the Year ==
- Kiyavi
- Top Stop
- Premium Latin
- Sony Music Latin

== Regional Mexican Song of the Year ==
- Banda Clave Nueva de Max Peraza – Cuál Adiós
- Banda Sinaloense MS de Sergio Lizárraga – Háblame de Ti
- Ariel Camacho y Los Plebes del Rancho – Te Metiste
- Julión Álvarez y Su Norteño Banda – El Amor de Su Vida

== Regional Mexican Songs Artist of the Year, Solo ==
- Gerardo Ortiz
- El Komander
- Remmy Valenzuela
- Roberto Tapia

== Regional Mexican Songs Artist of the Year, Duo or Group ==
- Banda Sinaloense MS de Sergio Lizárraga
- Calibre 50
- Julión Álvarez y Su Norteño Banda
- Los Plebes del Rancho de Ariel Camacho

== Regional Mexican Airplay Label of the Year ==
- DEL
- Remex
- Sony Music Latin
- Universal Music Latin Entertainment

== Regional Mexican Airplay Imprint of the Year ==
- DEL
- Disa
- Fonovisa
- Remex

== Regional Mexican Album of the Year ==
- Calibre 50 – Lo Mejor De...
- Julión Álvarez y Su Norteño Banda – El Aferrado
- Various – Las Bandas Románticas de América 2015
- Gerardo Ortiz – Hoy Más Fuerte

== Regional Mexican Albums Artist of the Year, Solo ==
- Chiquis Rivera
- Gerardo Ortiz
- Joan Sebastian
- Vicente Fernández

== Regional Mexican Albums Artist of the Year, Duo or Group ==
- Banda Sinaloense MS de Sergio Lizárraga
- Calibre 50
- Julión Álvarez y Su Norteño Banda
- Los Plebes del Rancho de Ariel Camacho

== Regional Mexican Albums Label of the Year ==
- Remex
- Lizos
- Sony Music Latin
- Universal Music Latin Entertainment

== Regional Mexican Albums Imprint of the Year ==
- DEL
- Disa
- Fonovisa
- Musart

== Latin Rhythm Song of the Year ==
- Zion & Lennox – Pierdo La Cabeza
- J Balvin – Ginza
- Maluma – Borro Cassette
- Nicky Jam feat. Enrique Iglesias – El Perdón

== Latin Rhythm Songs Artist of the Year, Solo ==
- Daddy Yankee
- Farruko
- Nicky Jam
- J Balvin

== Latin Rhythm Songs Artist of the Year, Duo or Group ==
- Alexis & Fido
- Baby Rasta & Gringo
- Plan B
- Zion & Lennox

== Latin Rhythm Airplay Label of the Year ==
- Baby
- Sony Music Latin
- Pina
- Universal Music Latin Entertainment

== Latin Rhythm Airplay Imprint of the Year ==
- Capitol Latin
- Melodías de Oro
- Sony Music Latin
- Pina

== Latin Rhythm Album of the Year ==
- Don Omar – Last Don ll
- Pitbull – Dale
- Tony Dize – La Melodía de la Calle, 3rd Season
- Yandel – Legacy: De Líder a Leyenda Tour

== Latin Rhythm Albums Artist of the Year, Solo ==
- Farruko
- Pitbull
- Don Omar
- Yandel

== Latin Rhythm Albums Artist of the Year, Duo or Group ==
- Baby Rasta & Gringo
- Kinto Sol
- Wisin & Yandel
- Plan B

== Latin Rhythm Albums Label of the Year ==
- Cinq
- Sony Music Latin
- La Industria
- Universal Music Latin Entertainment

== Latin Rhythm Albums Imprint of the Year ==
- Sony Music Latin
- Machete
- Mr. 305/Famous Artist
- Pina

== Songwriter of the Year ==
- Romeo Santos
- Horacio Palencia Cisneros
- Sergio Mercado
- Nicky Jam

== Publisher of the Year ==
- Mayimba Music Inc., ASCAP
- Palabras De Romeo, ASCAP
- Sony/ATV Discos Music Publishing LLC, BMI
- Universal – Música Unica Publishing, BMI

== Publishing Corporation of the Year ==
- El Productions LLC
- Sony/ATV Music
- Universal Music
- Warner/Chappell Music

== Producer of the Year ==
- Romeo Santos
- Jesús Jaime González Terrazas
- Saga WhiteBlack
- Jesús Tirado Castañeda

== Billboard Lifetime achievement award ==
- Marco Antonio Solís

== Billboard Latin Music Hall of Fame ==
- Alejandro Fernández
