= Mariposa Traicionera =

Single by Maná

from the album Revolución de Amor
- Language: Spanish
- English title: "Treacherous Butterfly"
- Released: March 19, 2003
- Recorded: February – May 2002
- Genre: Latin/Rock en Español
- Length: 4:22
- Songwriter: Fher Olvera

Maná singles chronology
"Eres Mi Religión" (2002)	"Mariposa Traicionera" (2003)	"Te Llevare Al Cielo" (2003)

Music video
- "Mariposa Traicionera" on YouTube

"Mariposa Traicionera" ("Treacherous Butterfly") is a song by Mexican rock band Maná, released on their sixth album, Revolución de Amor (2002). On March 19, 2003, the song debuted at No. 39 on the US Billboard Hot Latin Tracks. Thirteen weeks later, the track became Maná's first No. 1 hit on July 5, 2003, and continued to chart on the US Billboard Hot Latin Tracks for another twenty-six weeks.

== Charts ==
=== 2003 version ===
Chart (2003)	Peak position
Mexico (Monitor Latino)	1
US Hot Latin Songs (Billboard)	1
US Latin Pop Airplay (Billboard)	1
US Latin Tropical/Salsa Airplay (Billboard)	21

=== 2021 version ===
Chart (2021)	Peak position
Mexico (Billboard Mexico Airplay)	1

== Certifications ==
Region	Certification	Certified units/sales
United States (RIAA)	18× Platinum (Latin)	1,080,000^{‡}
2021 version
Mexico (AMPROFON)	Platinum+Gold	210,000^{‡}
United States (RIAA)	2× Platinum (Latin)	120,000^{‡}
^{‡} Sales+streaming figures based on certification alone.

== Awards ==
Premio Lo Nuestro

- Pop Song of the Year 2004

== See also ==
- List of number-one Billboard Hot Latin Tracks of 2003
