= Arroz Con Habichuela =

Studio album by El Gran Combo de Puerto Rico
- Released: November 28, 2006
- Recorded: 2004–2006
- Studio: Alfa Recordings Studio, Puerto Rico
- Genre: Salsa; tropical
- Length: 47:24
- Label: Sony International; Sony BMG Norte
- Producer: Freddy Miranda; Rafael Ithier

El Gran Combo de Puerto Rico chronology
Aquí Estamos y de Verdad (2004)	Arroz Con Habichuela (2006)	Sin Salsa No Hay Paraiso (2009)

Singles from Arroz Con Habichuela
- 1. "No Hay Manera" Released: 2006; 2. "Arroz Con Habichuela" Released: 2007; 3. "Si la Ves Por Ahí" Released: 2007; 4. "Te Veo Nena" Released: 2007; 5. "Yo No Mendigo Amor" Released: 2008

Professional ratings
Review scores
Source	Rating
AllMusic	4/5 stars

Arroz Con Habichuela (Rice with Beans) is the 2006 studio album by El Gran Combo de Puerto Rico. The Spanish title of the album means "rice with beans" in English which is a popular plate both in Puerto Rico and throughout Latin America. It is the first album featuring new member, Willie Sotelo, on piano who replaced longtime piano player, Rafael Ithier, so that Ithier could focus more on directing the band. Released by Sony International, the album garnered a radio hit with its first single, "No Hay Manera". The album also received the 2007 Latin Grammy Award for Best Salsa Album.

== Track listing ==
1. "Si la Ves Por Ahí" - 4:36
2. "Te Veo Nena" - 4:24
3. "No Hay Manera" - 4:31
4. "Arroz Con Habichuela" - 5:56
5. "Esa Mujer" - 4:33
6. "Como Tiembla el Alma" - 4:28
7. "Yo No Mendigo Amor" - 4:37
8. "Piénsalo" - 4:36
9. "No Te Detengas a Pensar" - 4:58
10. "Un No Sé Qué" - 4:36

== Personnel ==
- Coro, Editing - Alberto Carrion
- Art Direction - Angel Carrasco
- Arranger, Make-Up - Betzaida Bosch
- Vocals - Charlie Aponte
- Primary Artist - El Gran Combo De Puerto Rico
- Photography - Ferdinand Rodriguez
- Bajo Sexto - Fred Rivera
- Producer, Saxophone - Freddy Miranda
- Coro - Gilberto Santa Rosa
- Vocals - Jerry Rivas
- Art Direction - Jose Gazmey
- Composer - Julio Castro
- Composer - Marlow Rosado
- Trombone - Moises Nogueras
- Vocals - Papo Rosario
- Director, Producer - Rafael Ithier
- Bongos - Richie Bastar
- Trumpet - Taty Maldonado
- Arranger - Tommy Villarini
- Piano - Willie Sotelo
- Composer - Yoel Henriquez

== Chart position ==
Year	Chart	Album	Peak
2006	Billboard Latin Tropical Albums	Arroz Con Habichuela	1
2006	Billboard Top Heatseekers	Arroz Con Habichuela	13
2006	Billboard Top Latin Albums	Arroz Con Habichuela	21

== Awards and nominations ==
Latin Grammy Awards of 2007

Year	Nominated work	Award	Result
2007	Arroz Con Habichuela	Tropical Field - Best Salsa Album	Won

2007 Latin Billboard Music Awards

Year	Nominated work	Award	Result
2007	Arroz Con Habichuela	Tropical Album of the Year Duo or Group	Nominated

Premios Lo Nuestro 2008

Year	Nominated work	Award	Result
2008	Arroz Con Habichuela	Tropical Album of the Year	Nominated

== See also ==
- List of Billboard Tropical Albums number ones from the 2000s
