= Millo Torres =

Puerto Rican musician

- Origin: Santurce, Puerto Rico
- Genres: Reggae, Ska
- Occupation(s): Singer, songwriter
- Instrument(s): Vocals, guitar
- Years active: 1999–present

Millo Torres is a singer/guitarist from Puerto Rico, who has released six albums with his Latin world/music band, Millo Torres Y El Tercer Planeta.

Torres is a graduate of The Berklee College of Music, according to Allmusic Guide.

== Musical career ==
In its inception, Millo Torres group, El Tercer Planeta, was composed of bassist Tinci Moreno, keyboardist Javier Bermudo, guitarist Carlos Zubrzycki, percussionist Carlos Maldonado, and drummer Rigo Collazo. Currently the band includes Millo Torres (vocals gtr), Rigo Collazo on drums, Adolfo Fito González on bass guitar, Josué Parrilla on keyboards, Indrani Fuentes on vocals and Victor Román on saxophone.

The band's 1999 single, "Caminando" (also the name of their second album) reached No. 26 on the Billboard Latin/Tropical Airplay charts, and another single, "Mundo de Locura", reached No. 31 on Billboard's Latin Pop Airplay charts.

The band's album, Masa con Masa, released in 2007 received numerous awards and recognitions. The album includes songs like "Me gustas como quieras", "Dime Amor", and "Amigo Fiel". Masa con Masa have also received a nomination for Univision's 2008 Premios Lo Nuestro in the Best Rock Album category.

Latest Release Sol, A new flavor in world music. MTTP continues to explore the possibilities of fusion by arranging musical elements of reggae, ska and traditional World and Latin grooves in their unique style, with special guest, world master percussionist Giovanni Hidalgo

== Lyrical content ==
Torres introduces social and political content in his lyrics, as well as a passion for protecting the environment.

== Discography ==
- Sonando Realidad (1997), WEA International
- Caminando (1999), WEA International
- Mundo de Locura (2001), WEA International
- Canciones de Reggae y Ska (2003), Tribal Vibes Music
- Masa con Masa (2006), Tribal Vibes Music/ Universal
- Masa con Masa Deluxe Ed. (2007), Tribal Vibes/Machete
- Sol (2013), Tribal Vibes Music
