= Eres Mi Religión =

Single by Maná

from the album Revolución de Amor
- Released: October 7, 2002
- Recorded: February – May 2002
- Genre: Latin/Rock en Español
- Length: 5:33
- Label: WEA Latina
- Songwriter: Fher Olvera
- Producers: Fher Olvera & Alex González

Maná singles chronology
"Ángel de Amor" (2002)	"Eres Mi Religión" (2002)	"Mariposa Traicionera" (2003)

"Eres Mi Religión" (English: You Are My Religion) is the second radio single and ninth track from Maná's sixth studio album, Revolución de Amor (2002). On the week of October 7, 2002 the song debuted at number 47 on the U.S. Billboard Hot Latin Tracks and seven weeks later, on January 4, 2003, it reached its highest point at #17 for a week. It stayed on the charts for a total of 23 weeks.

== Charts ==
Chart (2003)	Peak position
US Hot Latin Songs (Billboard)	17
US Latin Pop Airplay (Billboard)	13
US Latin Tropical/Salsa Airplay (Billboard)	37

== Certifications ==
Region	Certification	Certified units/sales
United States (RIAA)	7× Platinum (Latin)	420,000^{‡}
^{‡} Sales+streaming figures based on certification alone.
