= Manda una Señal =

"Manda Una Señal"

Single by Maná

from the album Amar es Combatir
- Released: January 15, 2007
- Recorded: 2006
- Studio: Hit Factory Criteria (Miami, Florida, U.S.A)
- Genre: Latin rock · alternative rock · rock en español · latin ballad
- Length: 5:08
- Label: Warner Music Latina
- Songwriter: Fher Olvera
- Producer: Fher Olvera · Álex González

Maná singles chronology
"Bendita Tu Luz" (2006)	"Manda Una Señal" (2007)	"Ojalá Pudiera Borrarte" (2007)

"Manda Una Señal" (English: Send A Sign) is a Latin rock/rock song performed by the Mexican band Maná for their seventh studio album Amar es Combatir (2006). In early 2007, the song was released as the third official single from the album, and climbed to the #1 position of the Billboard Hot Latin Tracks chart.

== Music video ==
The music video (directed by Wayne Isham) was shot in Hollywood, Los Angeles. It shows the band performing live on stage throughout the video. First, crowds gather to see Maná performing live. Then the band walks down the Hollywood Walk of Fame and sees a couple exchanging their mobile phones in front of an open-air café. Maná are then shown in a car, driving down the streets of Hollywood. Later, a lone woman is shown waiting in an uninhabited queue line for the Revenge of the Mummy attraction. A couple is later shown in front of a mobile phone shop. Later, some people are shown in a hamburger bar.

== See also ==
- List of number-one Billboard Hot Latin Songs of 2007
