= Amar es Combatir =

Amar Es Combatir

Studio album by Maná
- Released: August 22, 2006
- Recorded: February–May 2006
- Studio: Hit Factory Criteria (Miami)
- Genre: Latin rock
- Length: 56:30
- Label: WEA Latina
- Producers: Fher Olvera & Alex González

Maná chronology
| Esenciales: Eclipse (2003) | Amar Es Combatir (2006) | Arde el Cielo (2008) |

Alternative covers
- Deluxe Limited Edition CD & DVD cover

Singles from Amar Es Combatir
- 1. "Labios Compartidos" Released: July 10, 2006; 2. "Bendita Tu Luz" Released: November 6, 2006; 3. "Manda Una Señal" Released: February 13, 2007; 4. "Ojalá Pudiera Borrarte" Released: June 12, 2007; 5. "El Rey Tiburón" Released: July 30, 2007

Professional ratings
Review scores
| Source | Rating |
|---|---|
| Allmusic | 4/5 stars |

Amar Es Combatir (English: "To Love Is To Fight") is the seventh studio album released by the Mexican pop rock band Maná. The album, which was released on August 22, 2006, became the band's first release in four years.

On February 11, 2007, the album won a Grammy Award in the category of Best Latin Rock/Alternative Album. On April 26, 2007, it received two Billboard Latin Music Awards.

The band Re-released this album with a Deluxe Limited Edition CD & DVD on March 27, 2007. The album was a commercial success selling more than 2.1 million copies worldwide.

== Track listing ==
Original track listing
| No. | Title | Writer(s) | Length |
|---|---|---|---|
| 1. | "Manda Una Señal (Send A Sign)" | Fher Olvera | 5:09 |
| 2. | "Labios Compartidos (Shared Lips)" | Fher Olvera | 4:40 |
| 3. | "Ojalá Pudiera Borrarte (I Wish I Could Erase You)" | Fher Olvera | 4:56 |
| 4. | "Arráncame el Corazón (Tear My Heart Out)" | Fher Olvera (lyrics); Alex González (music) | 4:45 |
| 5. | "Tengo Muchas Alas (I Have Many Wings)" | Fher Olvera | 4:33 |
| 6. | "Dime Luna (Tell Me Moon)" | Fher Olvera | 4:50 |
| 7. | "Bendita Tu Luz (Blessed Your Light)" (feat. Juan Luis Guerra) | Fher Olvera (lyrics); Sergio Vallín (music) | 4:24 |
| 8. | "Tú Me Salvaste (You Saved Me)" | Alex González | 4:20 |
| 9. | "Combatiente (Combatant)" | Fher Olvera (lyrics); Alex González (music) | 4:38 |
| 10. | "El Viaje (The Trip)" | Alex González | 4:17 |
| 11. | "El Rey Tiburón (The Shark King)" | Fher Olvera | 4:52 |
| 12. | "Somos Mar y Arena (We Are Sea and Sand)" | Fher Olvera (lyrics); Sergio Vallín (music) | 4:43 |
| 13. | "Relax" | Sergio Vallín | 4:17 |

Deluxe Limited Edition CD
| No. | Title | Writer(s) | Length |
|---|---|---|---|
| 14. | "Labios Compartidos" (Urban Version) | Fher Olvera | 4:29 |
| 15. | "Bendita Tu Luz" (Bachata Version – feat. Juan Luis Guerra) | Fher Olvera (lyrics); Sergio Vallín (music) | 4:18 |
| 16. | "Manda Una Señal" (Acoustic Version) | Fher Olvera | 4:41 |

Deluxe Limited Edition DVD
| No. | Title | Length |
|---|---|---|
| 1. | "Labios Compartidos (Music Video)" | 4:46 |
| 2. | "Bendita Tú Luz (Feat. Juan Luis Guerra) (Music Video)" | 4:09 |
| 3. | "Manda Una Señal (Music Video)" | 4:52 |
| 4. | "Bendita Tú Luz (Alternative Music Video)" | 4:10 |
| 5. | "Labios Compartidos (Acoustic Version On Telefe)" | 4:59 |
| 6. | "EPK Amar Es Combatir (Español)" | 7:25 |
| 7. | "EPK Amar Es Combatir (English)" | 7:24 |
| 8. | "Photo Gallery" | 1:36 |

== Personnel ==
- Francisco Ayon – assistant
- Miguel Bustamante – assistant engineer
- Juan Calleros – bass guitar, group member
- Juan Luis Guerra – guest vocals
- Albert Sterling Menendez – keyboards
- Fher Olvera – acoustic guitar, harmonica, electric guitar, main vocals, producer, choir, concept design, group member
- Carlos Perez – graphic design, creative director, concept design
- Fernando Quintana – choir
- Luis Rey – choir
- Thom Russo – mixing, recording
- Fabian Serrano – digital editing, coordination
- Fernando Vallín – guitar, bajo sexto, digital editing, choir, guitar technician
- Sergio Vallin – acoustic guitar, electric guitar, choir, group member
- Javier Valverde – digital editing, assistant engineer
- Alex González – drums, percussion, choir, group member

== Commercial performance ==
Amar Es Combatir debuted at #4 on the Billboard 200 chart and #1 on the Billboard Top Rock Albums chart, selling nearly 87,000 copies in its first week of release in the United States. This marked the highest first-week sales and chart position for a Spanish language album by a duo or group and the first Spanish language album to debut atop the rock albums tally. It is also tied with Shakira's Fijación Oral Vol. 1 (2005) as the highest debut of a Spanish language album in the history of Billboard. Both albums were surpassed in December 2020 by Puerto Rican singer Bad Bunny with his album El Último Tour del Mundo, which debuted at number one on the chart.

The album spawned three Billboard Hot Latin Tracks number one singles: "Labios Compartidos", "Bendita Tu Luz" and "Manda Una Señal".

== Charts ==
=== Album ===
| Chart (2006–07) | Peak position |
|---|---|
| Argentina Album Chart | 1 |
| Mexican Albums Chart | 1 |
| Spain PROMUSICAE Album Chart | 1 |
| Swiss Record Charts | 4 |
| Peruan Albums Chart | 1 |
| U.S. Billboard Top Latin Albums | 1 |
| U.S. Billboard Latin Pop Albums | 1 |
| U.S. Billboard Top Rock Albums | 1 |
| U.S. Billboard 200 | 4 |
| U.S. Billboard Top Internet Albums | 4 |
| Uruguay Album Charts | 1 |

=== Singles ===
| Year | Song | Chart | Peak position |
|---|---|---|---|
| 2006 | "Labios Compartidos" | U.S. Billboard Hot Latin Tracks | 1 |
| 2006 | "Labios Compartidos" | U.S. Billboard Latin Pop Airplay | 1 |
| 2006 | "Labios Compartidos" | U.S. Billboard Latin Tropical Airplay | 1 |
| 2006 | "Labios Compartidos" | U.S. Billboard Hot Ringtones | 12 |
| 2006 | "Labios Compartidos" | U.S. Billboard Hot 100 | 82 |
| 2006 | "Bendita Tu Luz" | U.S. Billboard Hot Latin Tracks | 1 |
| 2006 | "Bendita Tu Luz" | U.S. Billboard Latin Pop Airplay | 1 |
| 2006 | "Bendita Tu Luz" | U.S. Billboard Latin Tropical Airplay | 3 |
| 2007 | "Manda Una Señal" | U.S. Billboard Hot Latin Tracks | 1 |
| 2007 | "Manda Una Señal" | U.S. Billboard Latin Pop Airplay | 1 |
| 2007 | "Manda Una Señal" | U.S. Billboard Latin Tropical Airplay | 6 |
| 2007 | "Ojalá Pudiera Borrarte" | U.S. Billboard Hot Latin Tracks | 2 |
| 2007 | "Ojalá Pudiera Borrarte" | U.S. Billboard Latin Pop Airplay | 3 |

== Sales and certifications ==
| Region | Certification | Certified units/sales |
|---|---|---|
| Argentina (CAPIF) | 4× Platinum | 160,000^{^} |
| Brazil (Pro-Música Brasil) | Gold | 30,000^{*} |
| Colombia | Gold | |
| Ecuador | Gold | 3,000 |
| Mexico (AMPROFON) | 2× Platinum | 200,000^{^} |
| Spain (Promusicae) | 3× Platinum | 240,000^{^} |
| Switzerland (IFPI Switzerland) | Gold | 15,000^{^} |
| United States (RIAA) | 16× Platinum (Latin) | 702,000 |
| Venezuela | Platinum | |
^{*} Sales figures based on certification alone.^{^} Shipments figures based on certification alone.

== Awards ==
Billboard Latin Music Awards

- Latin Rock/Alternative Album of the Year
- Latin Pop Airplay Song of the Year by a Duo or Group – "Labios Compartidos"

Grammy Awards

- Best Latin Rock/Alternative Album

MTV Video Music Awards Latin America

- Video of the Year – "Labios Compartidos"
- Best Rock Artist
- MTV Legend Award

== See also ==
- 2006 in Latin music
- Amar es Combatir Tour
- List of best-selling Latin albums in the United States
- List of best-selling Latin albums
