= Ojalá Pudiera Borrarte =

Single by Maná

from the album Amar es Combatir
- Released: June 12, 2007
- Studio: Hit Factory Criteria (Miami)
- Genre: Latin
- Length: 4:55 (Album Version); 4:32 (Radio Edit)
- Songwriter: Fher Olvera

Maná singles chronology
"Manda Una Señal" (2007)	"Ojalá Pudiera Borrarte" (2007)	"El Rey Tiburón" (2008)

"Ojalá Pudiera Borrarte" (I Wish I Could Erase You) is a song recorded and performed by Mexican Latin rock group Maná. The song is the fourth radio single released in promotion of their seventh studio album, Amar es Combatir (2006).

== Track listing ==
1. "Ojalá Pudiera Borrarte" (Album Version)-4:55
2. "Ojalá Pudiera Borrarte" (Radio Edit) - 4:32 (Fher Olvera)

== Music video ==
The video is set in Buenos Aires. The opening shot of the video shows a woman in an office and immediately after that walking down Hipólito Yrigoyen street where the La Franco building can be seen. Later, she passes an open-air café, then a vinyl record shop. A child blows bubbles in front of the shop. Meanwhile, a guy sits and thinks of the woman on an armchair in his house. Meanwhile, the woman enters a cinema and comes on stage, looking for someone else. Meanwhile, after the guy celebrates his birthday, he finds a pendant which reminds him of her. He then goes to a photo booth. He takes a picture of himself which comes out as a negative. As soon as he rips it off the slot, he sees that the pictures of him magically disappear. When he goes back home, he opens the refrigerator and finds the photos on the door. The woman walks by Plaza de Mayo where the Casa Rosada and the Banco de la Nación Argentina buildings can be seen. The video is intercut with sequences of Maná performing in a room with spotlights and a pink curtain.

== Chart positions ==
- #2 (Billboard Hot Latin Tracks)
- #3 (Billboard Latin Pop Airplay)#8 (Pop Rock Venezuela)
