= Bendita tu luz =

"Bendita Tu Luz"

Single by Maná featuring Juan Luis Guerra

from the album Amar es Combatir
- Released: November 6, 2006
- Studio: Hit Factory Criteria (Miami)
- Genre: Latin pop, bachata
- Length: 4:23
- Composer: Sergio Vallín
- Lyricist: Fher Olvera

Maná singles chronology
"Labios Compartidos" (2006)	"Bendita Tu Luz" (2006)	"Manda Una Señal" (2007)

Juan Luis Guerra singles chronology
"Los Dinteles" (2006)	"Bendita Tu Luz" (2006)	"La llave de mi corazón" (2007)

"Bendita Tu Luz" (Blessed (is) your light in English) is a bachata song, the second single released from Maná's seventh studio album, Amar es Combatir (2006). The song features Juan Luis Guerra on the vocals.

== Chart performance ==
Initially, the song proved to be less successful than its predecessor - "Labios Compartidos" - as it did not gain as much airplay as the latter. Nevertheless, the song reached the top spot of the chart for the week of November 16, 2006, being replaced on December 23 by the smash Ricky Martin hit "Tu Recuerdo". At this point, "Bendita Tu Luz" became Maná's third number-one single on the chart, and their second in a single year.

On January 13, 2007, the song regained its position at number-one ten weeks after its chart debut, which occurred on November 4, 2006. In Venezuela, the song peaked at #1 on the Record Report Top Latino chart.

== Music video ==
The music video tells the story of how two college sweethearts meet. A young woman begins to gain interest in a young man while the two are in college. She sees him all over campus and he gains her interest. She tries to gain his attention by showing up at a pool where he's swimming and dropping a hair clip on his head, but to no avail. She finally confronts him one day and learns he's blind. After meeting, the two start a romantic relationship, with him showing her how it is to be blind. Throughout the video Maná is playing in a small club with Juan Luis Guerra. At the end of the video, the happy college couple go to the club and dance while Maná and Juan Luis Guerra sing "Bendita Tu Luz".

== Charts ==
Chart (2006–07)	Peak position
Mexican Airplay (Associated Press)	8
US Hot Latin Songs (Billboard)	1
Venezuela Airplay (Record Report)	1

== Certifications ==
Region	Certification	Certified units/sales
United States (RIAA)	Diamond (Latin)	600,000^{‡}
^{‡} Sales+streaming figures based on certification alone.

== See also ==
- List of number-one Billboard Hot Latin Songs of 2006
- List of number-one Billboard Hot Latin Songs of 2007
