= Labios Compartidos =

Single by Maná

from the album Amar es Combatir
- Released: July 10, 2006
- Recorded: 2006
- Studio: Hit Factory Criteria (Miami)
- Genre: Latin rock; alternative rock
- Length: 5:19
- Songwriter: Fher Olvera

Maná singles chronology
"Baila morena" (2006)	"Labios Compartidos" (2006)	"Bendita tu luz" (2006)

Music video
- "Labios Compartidos" on YouTube

"Labios Compartidos" (English: "Shared Lips") is the first single released from Maná's seventh studio album, Amar es Combatir (2006). It became one of the band's most recognized songs, topping the Billboard Hot Latin Tracks chart for eight consecutive weeks.

== Song information ==
The song deals with the theme of falling in love with someone else's lover; that's where the title of the song comes from (literally "Shared Lips"). The music video for the song also has this concept.

=== Chart success ===
"Labios Compartidos" became a major hit in dozens of countries, topping the Spanish charts for three weeks.

The song has also enjoyed some moderate success in the United States. It debuted at number one on the Billboard Hot Latin Tracks chart and on the Latin Pop Tracks chart.

"Labios Compartidos" stayed on the top of the Hot Latin Tracks chart for nine weeks, becoming the band's first number one on that chart since "Mariposa Traicionera" (2003). The song was also able to perform a minor crossover into mainstream radio stations and peaked at number 82 on the US Billboard Hot 100, becoming the band's biggest hit on the United States to this date. It also charted on the Hot Ringtones chart, peaking at number 12.

== Music video ==
The music video for the song, which was directed by Pablo Croce, depicts a woman taking advantage of a man, and making him suffer through the knowledge that she betrays him. This fits in with the idea that he's sharing her with another but is unable to leave her because he always falls for her when she returns. When the song entered on the US Billboard Hot 100, MTV Hits started to air the music video.

== Awards ==
On October 19, 2006, the song and video were nominated for both Video of the Year and Song of the Year on Los Premios MTV Latinoamérica, only to win Video of the Year. On August 29, 2007, Fher Olvera received a Latin Grammy Award nomination for this song in Song of the Year category. Also, the video was nominated for Best Music Video, winning none.

== Charts ==
=== Weekly charts ===
Chart (2006)	Peak position
US Billboard Hot 100	82
US Hot Latin Songs (Billboard)	1
US Latin Pop Airplay (Billboard)	1
US Tropical Airplay (Billboard)	1
Venezuela Top Latino (Record Report)	1

=== Year-end charts ===
Chart (2006)	Position
US Hot Latin Songs (Billboard)	10

== Certifications ==
Region	Certification	Certified units/sales
Mexico (AMPROFON) Ringtone	Diamond+4× Platinum	350,000^{*}
Spain (Promusicae)	Platinum	60,000^{‡}
United States (RIAA)	15× Platinum (Latin)	900,000^{‡}
^{*} Sales figures based on certification alone.^{‡} Sales+streaming figures based on certification alone.

== See also ==
- List of number-one Billboard Hot Latin Songs of 2006
