= Latin Grammy Award for Best Norteño Album =

- Awarded for: quality albums of the norteño music genre
- Country: United States
- Presented by: The Latin Recording Academy
- First award: 2000
- Currently held by: Grupo Frontera for Lo Que Me Falta Por Llorar (2026)
- Website: latingrammy.com

The Latin Grammy Award for Best Norteño Album is an honor presented annually at the Latin Grammy Awards, a ceremony that recognizes excellence and creates a wider awareness of cultural diversity and contributions of Latin recording artists in the United States and internationally.

The award goes to solo artists, duos, or groups for releasing vocal or instrumental albums containing at least 51% of new recordings in the norteño genre.

Los Tigres del Norte are the most awarded performers with nine accolades in this category and they were also the first recipient of this award in 2000 for the album Herencia de Familia.

== Winners and nominees ==
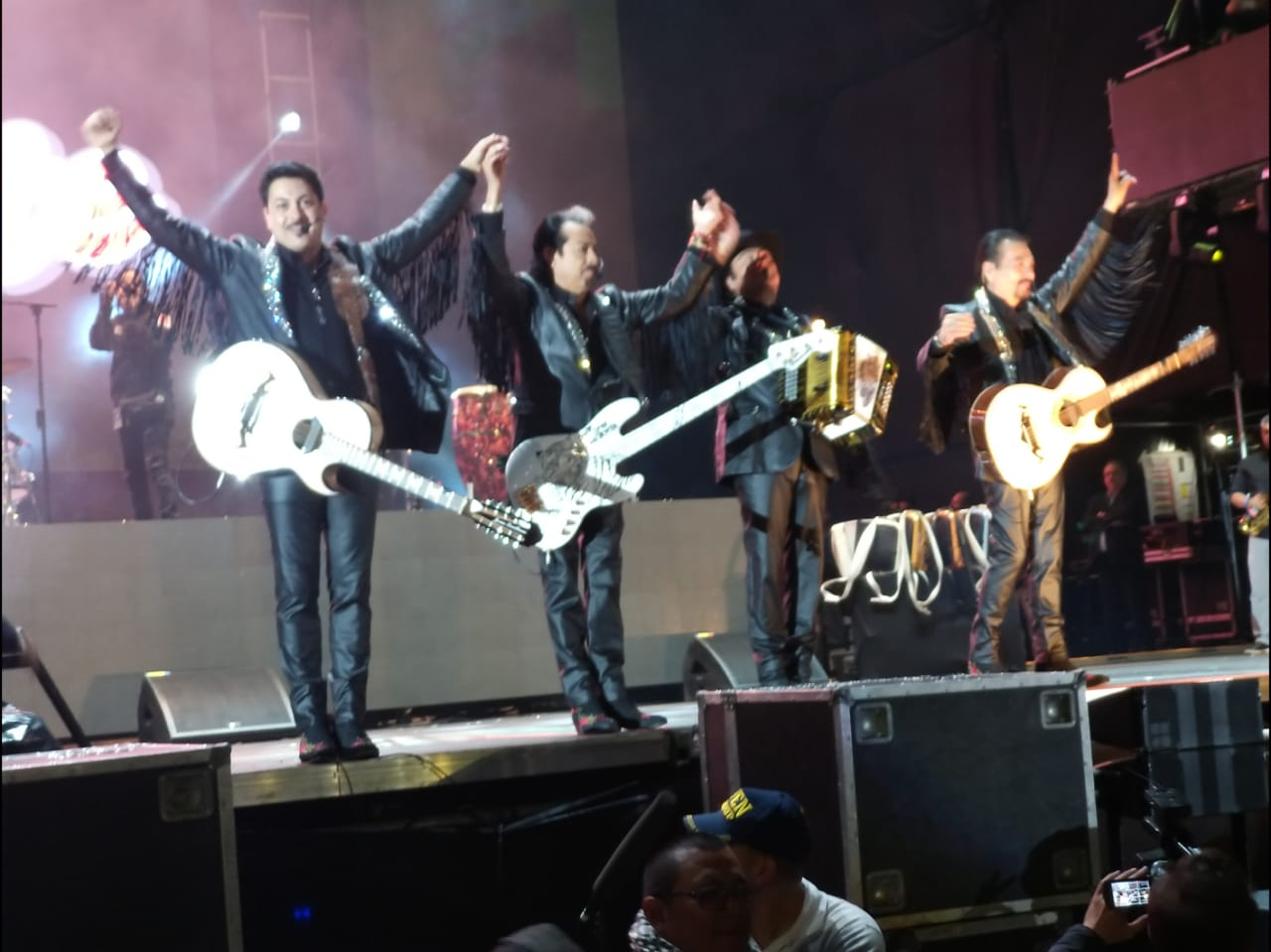

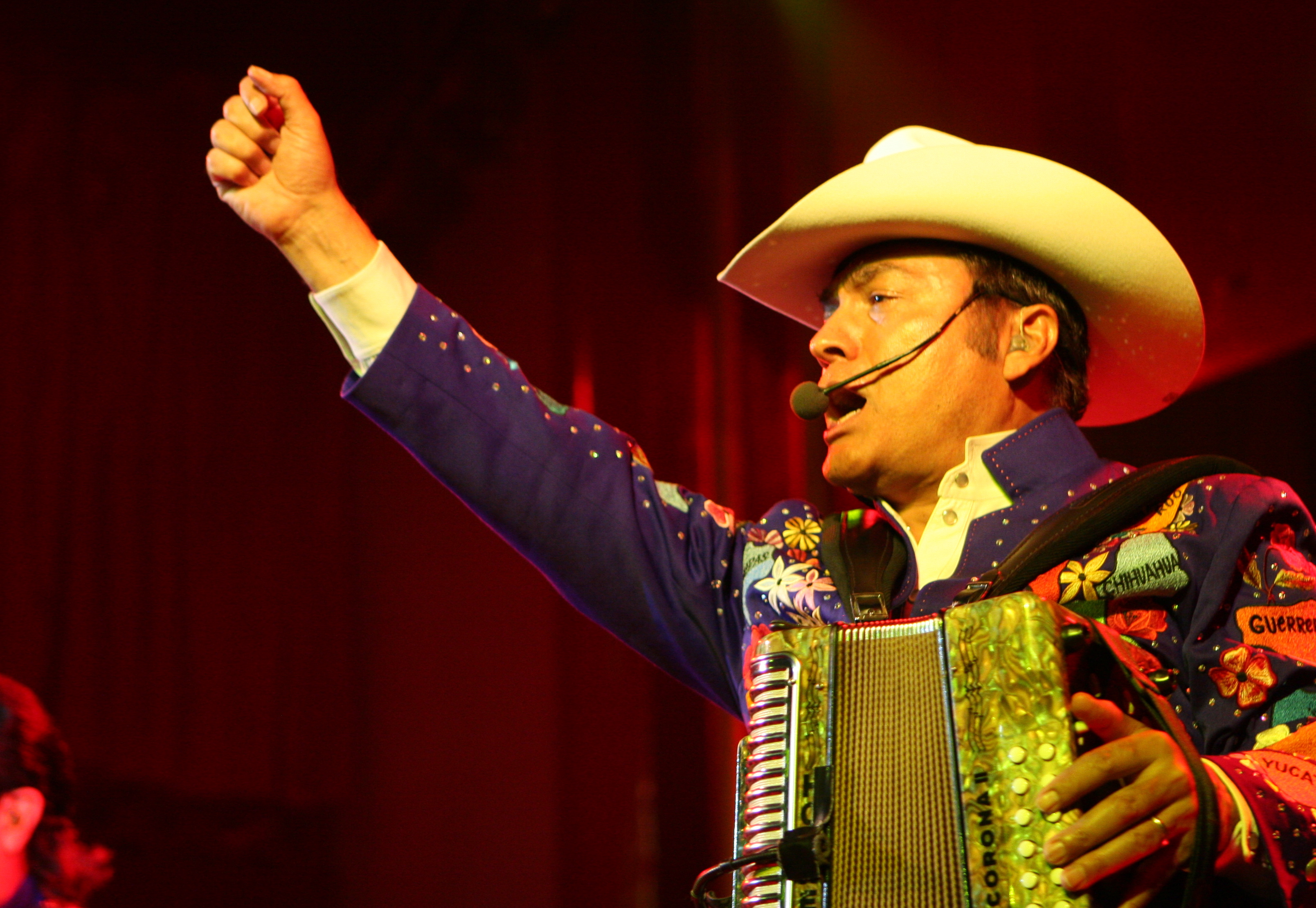
Norteño band Los Tigres del Norte (top) and Jorge Hernández, the band's accordionist and primary vocalist (bottom). The band has won this award eight times, in 2000, 2004, 2006, 2011, 2016, 2020, 2022 and 2025.

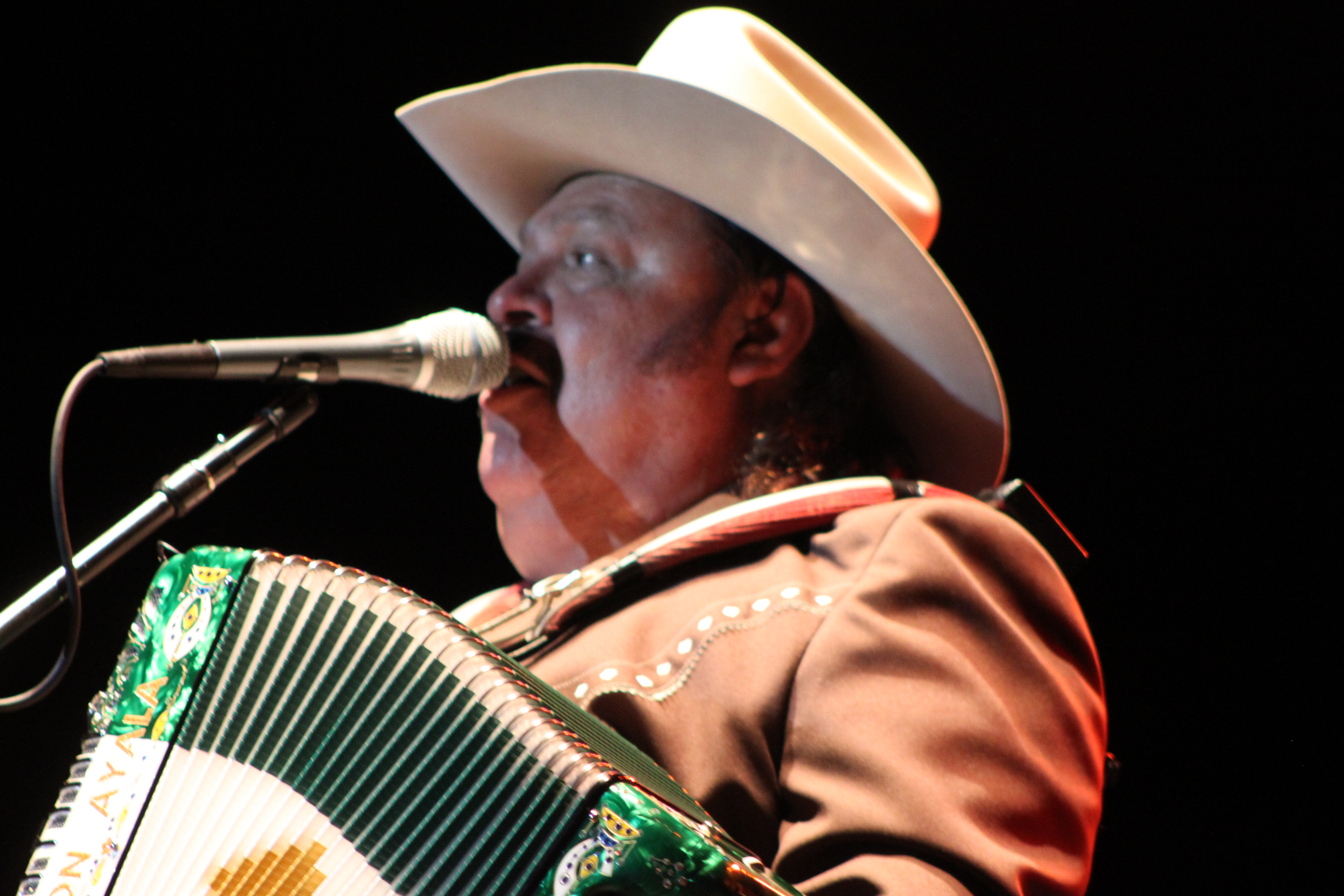
Mexican group Ramón Ayala y sus Bravos del Norte has won this award twice, in 2001 and 2002.

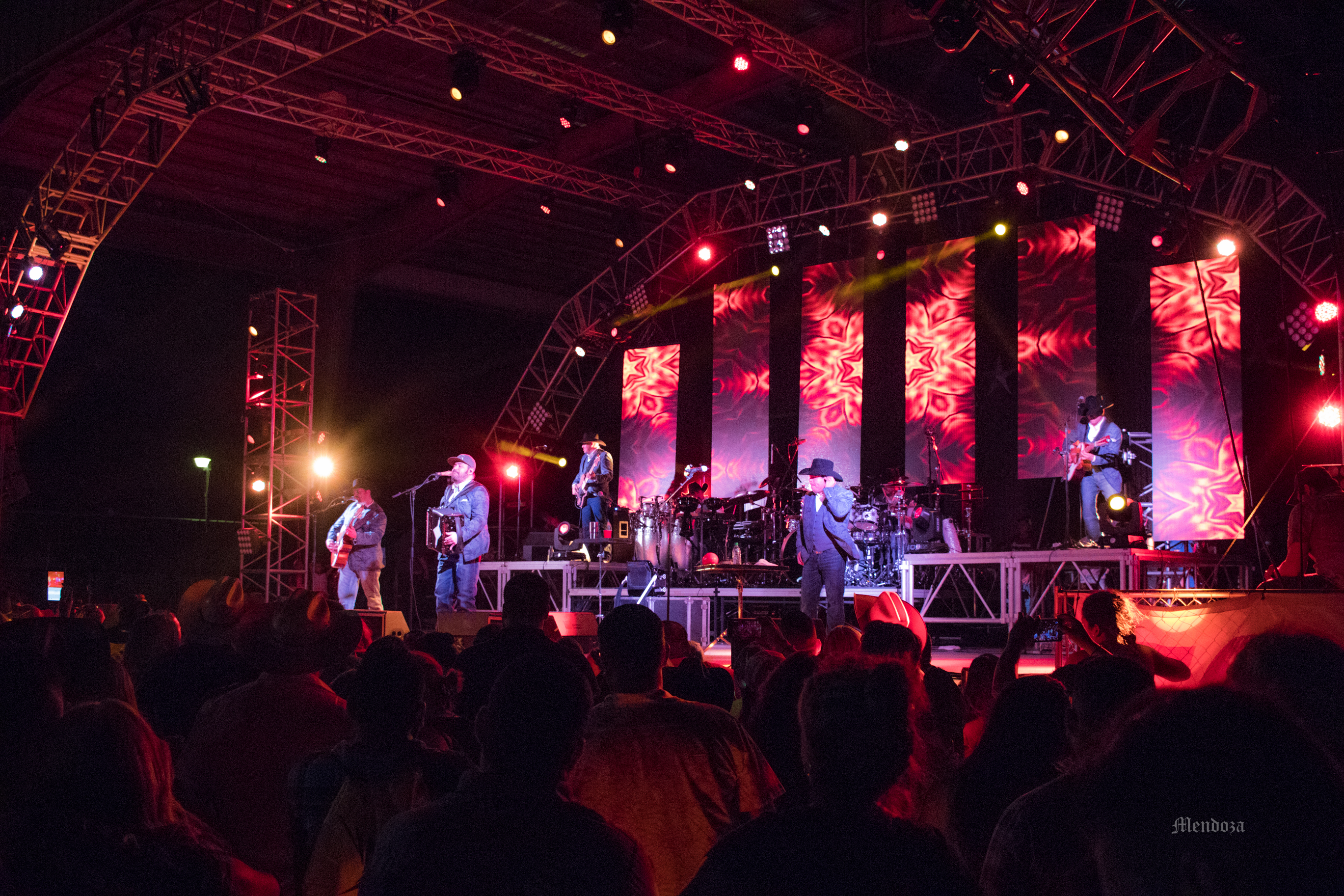
American band Intocable has received this award three times, in 2005, 2013 and 2019.

2007 winner Michael Salgado.

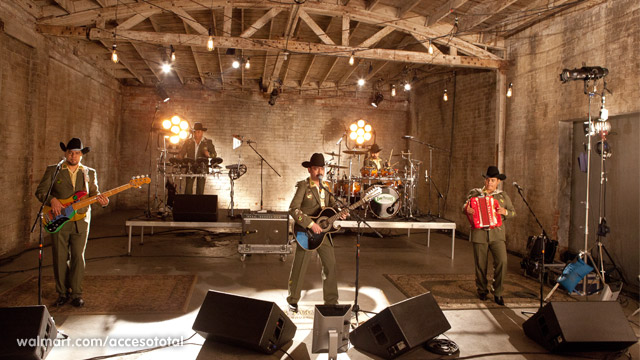
2012 winner Los Tucanes de Tijuana.

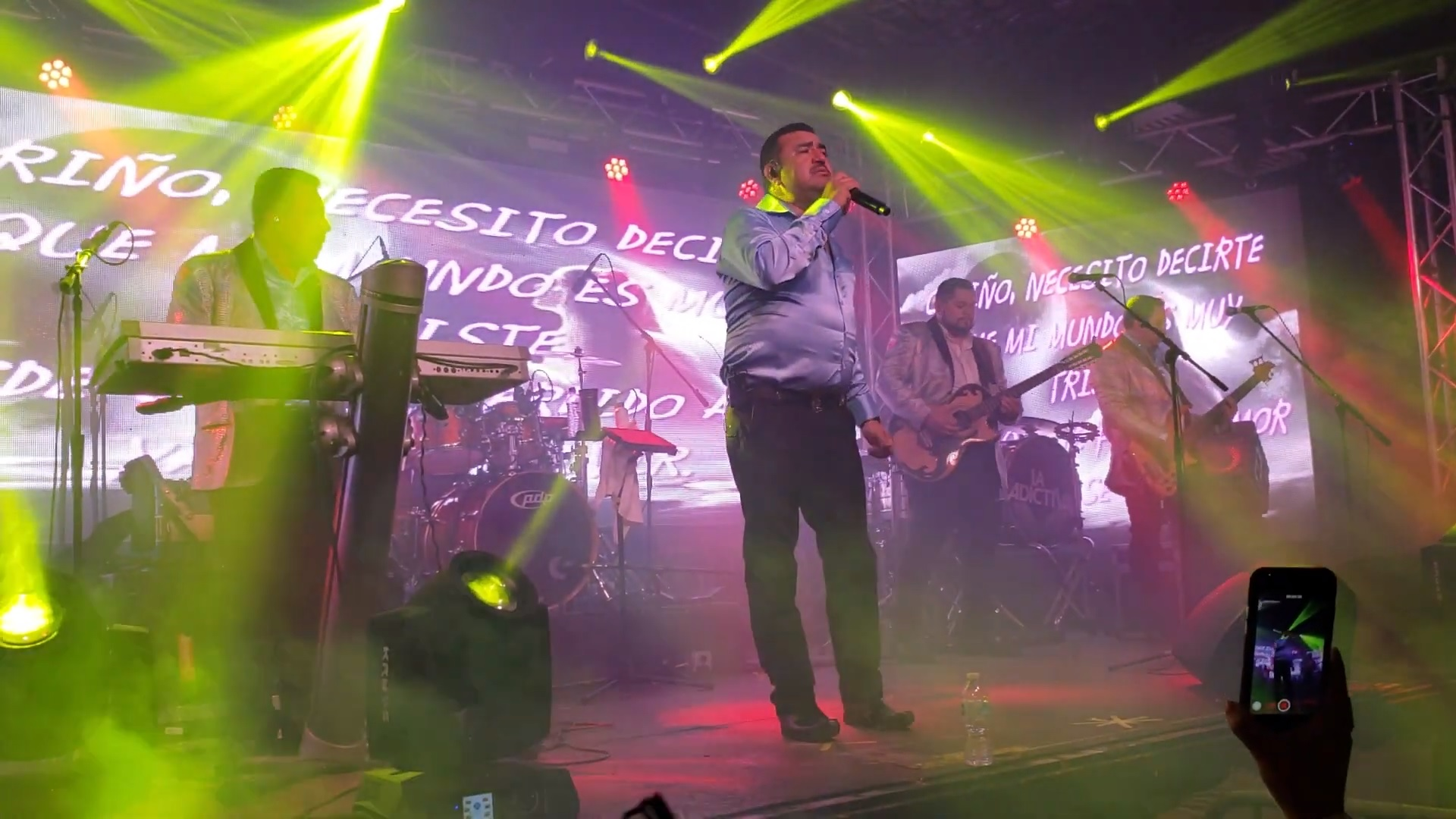
Mexican band Conjunto Primavera won this award in 2014 for Amor Amor.

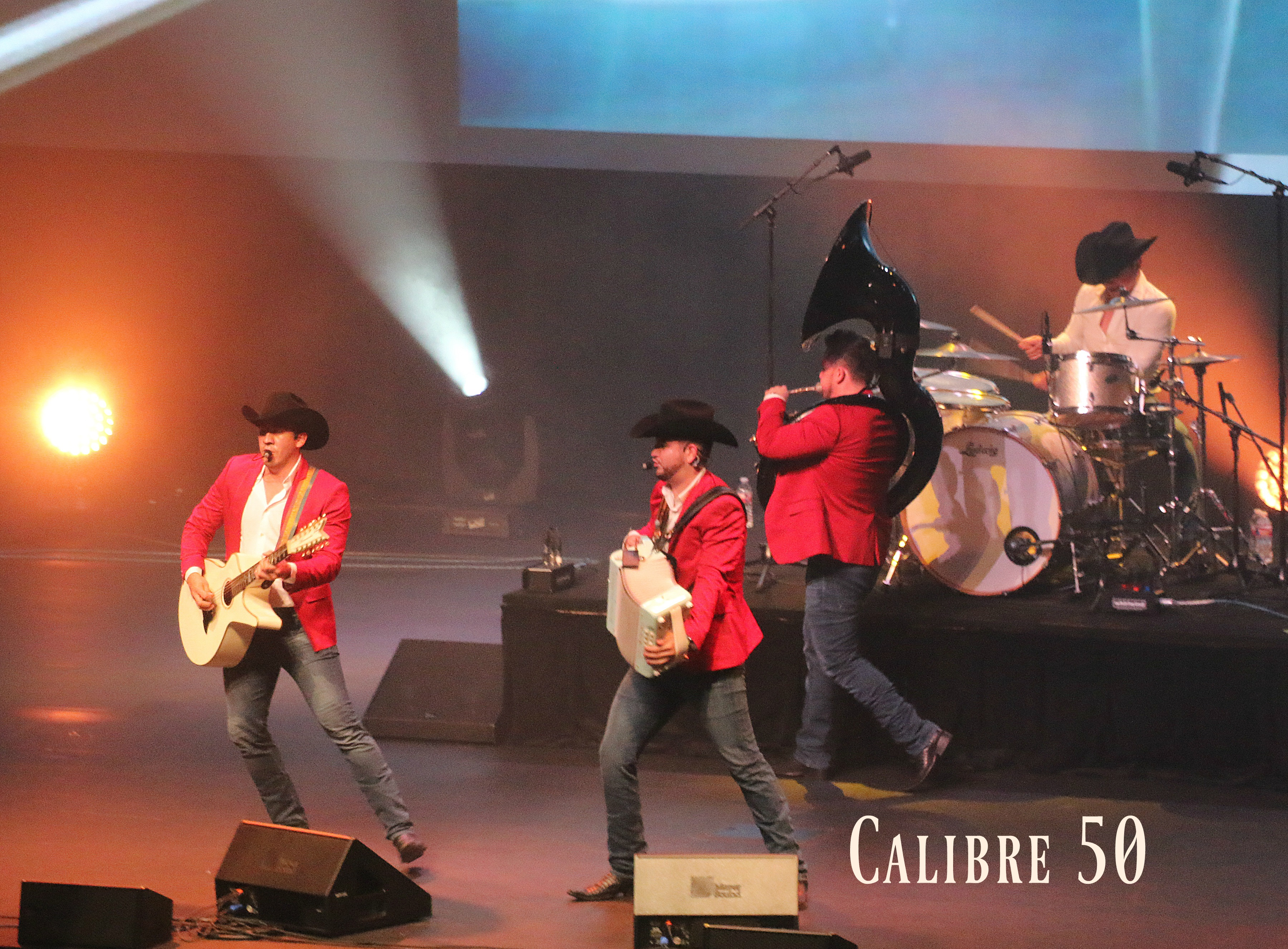
Mexican band Calibre 50 won this award in 2018 for Guerra de Poder.

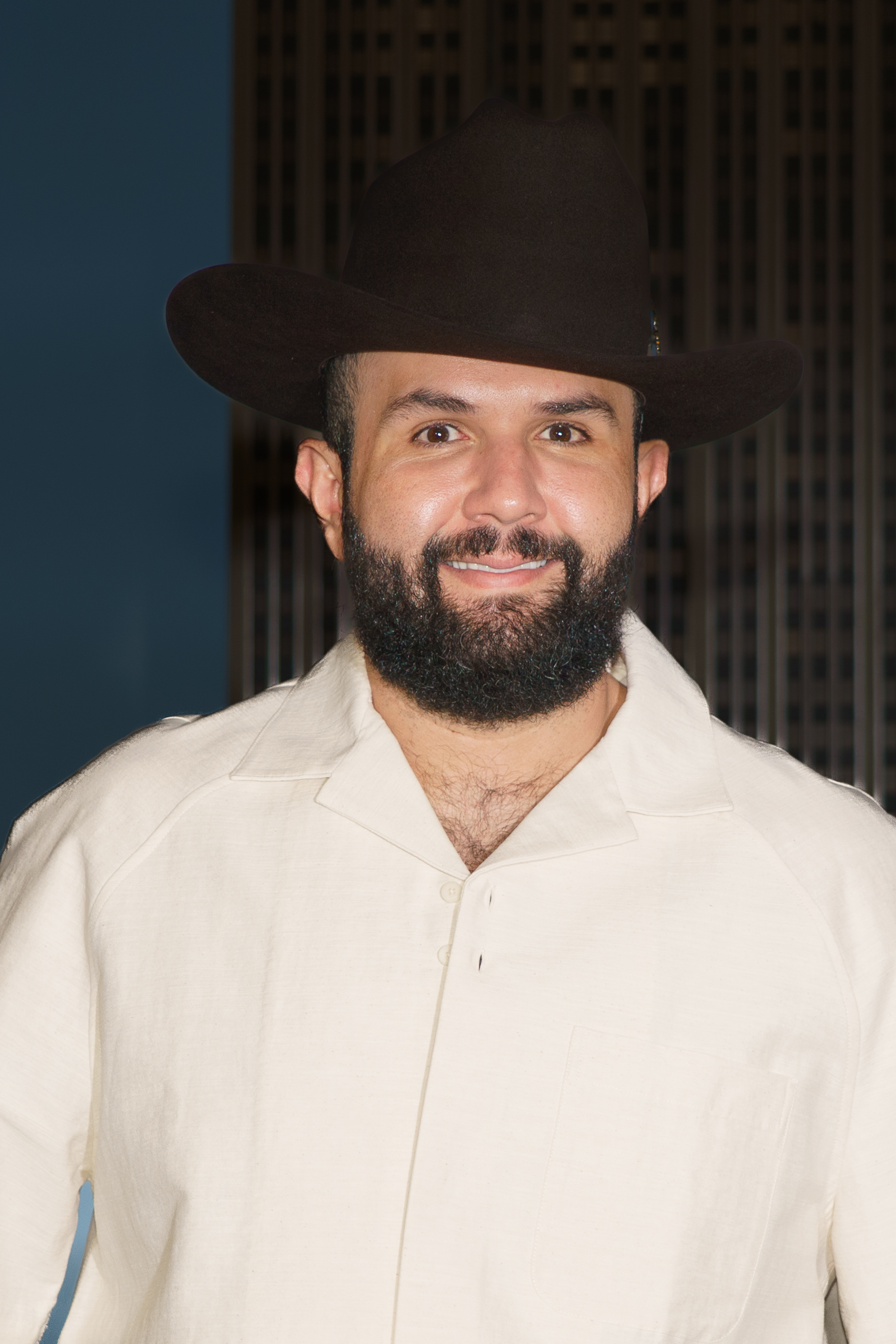
Carín León won the award in 2023 for Colmillo de Leche.

Year^{[I]}	Performing artist(s)	Work	Nominees^{[II]}	Ref.
2000	Los Tigres del Norte	Herencia de Familia	Grupo Atrapado – ¡Oh! Que Gusto; Intocable – Contigo; Los Tucanes de Tijuana – Al Por Mayor; Cornelio Reyna Jr. featuring Ramón Ayala y Sus Bravos del Norte – La Leyenda Continúa...	
2001	Ramón Ayala y sus Bravos del Norte	Quémame Los Ojos/Amigos Del Alma	Grupo Atrapado – Atrapando Tú Corazón; Los Tigres del Norte – De Paisano A Paisano; Los Tucanes de Tijuana – Me Gusta Vivir De Noche; Polo Urías y Su Máquina Norteña – De Chihuahua Para Ti	
2002	Ramón Ayala y sus Bravos del Norte	El Número Cien	Grupo Atrapado – Muevete Muevete Mas; Intocable – Sueños; Los Huracanes del Norte – Mensaje De Oro; Los Palominos – Un Poco Más	
2003	Los Terribles del Norte	La Tercera Es La Vencida... Eso!	Juan Acuña & El Terror Del Norte – Pa' Toda Mi Raza...Eso!; Conjunto Primavera – Perdoname Mi Amor; Los Tucanes de Tijuana – Jugo A La Vida; Pesado – No Te La Vas A Acabar!	
2004	Los Tigres del Norte	Pacto de Sangre	Ramón Ayala y Sus Bravos del Norte – Titere en Tus Manos/El Invicto; Conjunto Primavera – Decide Tú; Los Palominos – Canciones de la Rockola; Michael Salgado – Entre Copas	
2005	Intocable	Diez	Conjunto Primavera – Hoy Como Ayer; Los Palominos – Atrévete; Los Tigres del Norte – Directo Al Corazón; Michael Salgado – El Zurdo de Oro	
2006	Los Tigres del Norte	Historias Que Contar	Ramón Ayala y Sus Bravos del Norte – Ya No Llores; Pesado – Tu Sombra; Palomo – Pasión; Michael Salgado – Volver Volver	
2007	Michael Salgado	En Vivo	Conjunto Primavera – El Amor Que Nunca Fue; Intocable – Crossroads: Cruce de Caminos; Pesado – Piénsame Un Momento; Siggno – Capítulo 5	
2008	Siggno	Six Pack	Conjunto Primavera – Que Ganas de Volver; Los Palominos – Me Enamoré de un Angel; Los Tigres del Norte – Raíces; Pesado – Corridos: Defendiendo el Honor	
2009	Costumbre	Siempre	Cardenales de Nuevo León – Se Renta Un Corazón; Costumbre – Siempre; Los Huracanes del Norte – Mi Complemento; Los Invasores de Nuevo León – Amor Aventurero; Los Rieleros del Norte – Pese a Quien le Pese	
2010	Pesado	Desde La Cantina Vol. 1.	Duelo – Solamente Tú; Intocable – Classic; Los Tigres del Norte – La Granja; Los Tucanes de Tijuana – Retro-Corridos	
2011	Los Tigres del Norte	MTV Unplugged: Los Tigres del Norte and Friends	Intocable – Intocable 2011; Los Huracanes del Norte – Soy Mexicano; Los Tucanes de Tijuana – Árbol; Pesado – Desde La Cantina, Volumen II	
2012	Los Tucanes de Tijuana	365 Días	Regulo Caro – Amor En Tiempos de Guerra; Duelo – Vuela Muy Alto; Implakable – Simplemente; Gerardo Ortíz – Entre Dios Y El Diablo; Siggno – Lo Que Me Dejastes	
2013	Intocable	En Peligro de Extinción	Los Canarios De Michoacán – Hoy y Siempre; Emilio Navaira – A Las Personas de Mi Vida; Pesado – Mi Promesa; Voz de Mando – Y Ahora Resulta	
2014	Conjunto Primavera	Amor Amor	El Poder Del Norte – XX Años; Los Rieleros del Norte – En Tus Manos; Pesado – Por Ti; Polo Urías y Su Máquina Norteña – Clásicas De Ayer Y Siempre	
2015	Pesado	Abrázame	Ariel Camacho y Los Plebes del Rancho – El Karma; La Energía Norteña – Cruzando Territorio; Remmy Valenzuela – Mi Vida en Vida; Voz de Mando – Levantando Polvadera	
2016	Los Tigres del Norte	Desde El Azteca	Joss Favela – Hecho a Mano; Intocable – Highway; Los Ramones De Nuevo León – Tierra Mojada; Pesado – Tributo a Los Alegres De Terán	
2017	Los Palominos	Piénsalo	Leonardo Aguilar – Gallo Fino; Los Huracanes del Norte – Alma Bohemia; Los Invasores de Nuevo León – No. 50; Los Tercos – Los Tercos	
2018	Calibre 50	Guerra de Poder	Adrián Acosta – Irremplazable; Conjunto Primavera – Con Toda la Fuerza; Voz de Mando – El Que a Ti Te Gusta	
2018	Pesado	Los Ángeles Existen	Adrián Acosta – Irremplazable; Conjunto Primavera – Con Toda la Fuerza; Voz de Mando – El Que a Ti Te Gusta	
2019	Intocable	Percepción	Bronco – Por Más; Buyuchek – Las Canciones De La Abuela; Calibre 50 – Mitad y Mitad; La Maquinaria Norteña – Amo	
2020	Los Tigres del Norte	Los Tigres del Norte at Folsom Prison	Buyuchek, La Abuela Irma Silva – De Terán para el Mundo; Calibre 50 – Simplemente Gracias; Eugenia León – A Los 4 Vientos Vol. 2 "Norteño"; Los Cardenales de Nuevo León – La Historia Continúa	
2021	Los Dos Carnales	Al Estilo Rancherón	Calibre 50 – Vamos Bien; Gera Demara – De Vieja Escuela; La Energía Norteña – Diez; Los Plebes del Rancho de Ariel Camacho, Christian Nodal – Recordando a una Leyenda	
2021	Palomo	Volando Alto	Calibre 50 – Vamos Bien; Gera Demara – De Vieja Escuela; La Energía Norteña – Diez; Los Plebes del Rancho de Ariel Camacho, Christian Nodal – Recordando a una Leyenda	
2022	Los Tigres del Norte	La Reunión (Deluxe)	Bronco – Bienvenida la Vida; Los Tucanes de Tijuana – Corridos Felones (Serie35); Pesado – Esta se Acompañas con Cerveza; Yahritza y Su Esencia – Obsessed	
2023	Carin León	Colmillo de Leche	Joss Favela – Aclarando la Mente; La Abuela Irma Silva – Family & Friends; La Energía Norteña – Fuera de Serie; Los Rieleros del Norte – Hay Niveles (Deluxe)	
2024	Grupo Frontera	El Comienzo	Intocable – Modus Operandi; Los Nietos de Terán – LNDT; Pesado – Te Amaré; Sofi Saar – Terca	
2025	Los Tigres del Norte	La Lotería	El Plan & Manuel Alejandro – El Plan & Manuel Alejandro; La Energía Norteña – Pasado, Presente, Futuro; Alfredo Olivas – V1V0; Pesado – Frente a Frente	
2026	Grupo Frontera	Lo Que Me Falta Por Llorar	Calibre 50 – El Mundo Es del Que Se Anima; Duelo – Gravedad; Joss Favela – Mis Compas Vol. 2	

^{^[I]} Each year is linked to the article about the Latin Grammy Awards held that year.

== See also ==
- Grammy Award for Best Norteño Album
- Regional styles of Mexican music
