= De Oro (disambiguation) =

De Oro is a collaborative album made by Astronautalis.

De Oro may also refer to:

== Locations ==
- Cagayan de Oro, city in the Philippines
- Davao de Oro, province in the Philippines
- Río de Oro, part of the Spanish Sahara
- Río de Oro, town in Columbia
- Río de Oro, river in Morocco
- Río de Oro, river in Argentina
- Río de Oro, river in Columbia and Venezuela
- Maco, Davao de Oro, municipality in the Philippines
- Playa de Oro International Airport, international airport in Mexico
- Baño de Oro, historic recreation center and swimming pool
- Ciénaga de Oro, town and municipality in Columbia
- Montaña de Oro State Park, state park in Central Coastal California
- 363 Copa De Oro Road, house in LA, California

== Schools ==
- Cagayan de Oro College, college in Cagayan de Oro
- Cagayan de Oro National High School, high school in Cagayan de Oro

== People ==
- Antonio de Oro, Spanish military officer
- Ángel de Oro, Mexican professional wrestler
- Bracito de Oro, Mexican professional wrestler

== Media ==
- Jaula de Oro (album), 1984 studio album by Los Tigres del Norte
- Jaula de oro (song) song by Los Tigres del Norte
- La jaula de oro (1987 film), film inspired by the song
- La jaula de oro (telenovela)
- El gallo de oro, Mexican TV series

== Other ==
- Copa de Oro, football tournament
- Banco de Oro, Philippine banking company
