= List of number-one Billboard Regional Mexican Songs of 1994–1995 =

The Billboard Regional Mexican Songs chart ranks the best-performing Regional Mexican singles in the United States. Published weekly by Billboard magazine, it ranks the "most popular regional Mexican songs, ranked by radio airplay audience impressions as measured by Nielsen Music".

== 1994 ==
Issue date	Song	Artist(s)	Ref.
October 8	"La niña fresa"	Banda Zeta	
October 15	"La niña fresa"	Banda Zeta	
October 22	"A capa y espada"	Industria del Amor	
October 29	"La niña fresa"	Banda Zeta	
November 5	"Ni el primero ni el último"	Los Rehenes	
November 12	"Ni el primero ni el último"	Los Rehenes	
November 19	"Ni el primero ni el último"	Los Rehenes	
November 26	"Ni el primero ni el último"	Los Rehenes	
December 3	"No me queda más"	Selena	
December 10	"No me queda más"	Selena	
December 17	"No me queda más"	Selena	
December 24	"Me duele estar solo"	La Mafia	
December 31	"Me duele estar solo"	La Mafia	

== 1995 ==
Key
†	Indicates number 1 on Billboard's year-end regional Mexican chart

Tejano group La Mafia earned three number-one songs in 1995.

Issue date	Song	Artist(s)	Ref.
January 7	"Me duele estar solo"	La Mafia	
January 14	"No me queda más"	Selena	
January 21	"Me duele estar solo"	La Mafia	
January 28	"No me queda más"	Selena	
February 4	"Me duele estar solo"	La Mafia	
February 11	"Que no me olvide"	Bronco	
February 18	"Que no me olvide"	Bronco	
February 25	"Que no me olvide"	Bronco	
March 4	"Que no me olvide"	Bronco	
March 11	"Que no me olvide"	Bronco	
March 18	"Que no me olvide"	Bronco	
March 25	"Que no me olvide"	Bronco	
April 1	"Que no me olvide"	Bronco	
April 8	"Toma mi amor"	La Mafia	
April 15	"Fotos y recuerdos"	Selena	
April 22	"Fotos y recuerdos"	Selena	
April 29	"Toma mi amor"	La Mafia	
May 6	"Toma mi amor"	La Mafia	
May 13	"Toma mi amor"	La Mafia	
May 20	"Toma mi amor"	La Mafia	
May 27	"Esa mujer"	Bronco	
June 3	"Una mujer como tú"	Marco Antonio Solís & Los Bukis	
June 10	"Una mujer como tú"	Marco Antonio Solís & Los Bukis	
June 17	"Nadie"	La Mafia	
June 24	"Nadie"	La Mafia	
July 1	"Nadie"	La Mafia	
July 8	"Nadie"	La Mafia	
July 15	"Tú, sólo tú" †	Selena	
July 22	"Tú, sólo tú" †	Selena	
July 29	"Tú, sólo tú" †	Selena	
August 5	"Tú, sólo tú" †	Selena	
August 12	"Tú, sólo tú" †	Selena	
August 19	"Tú, sólo tú" †	Selena	
August 26	"Tú, sólo tú" †	Selena	
September 2	"Tú, sólo tú" †	Selena	
September 9	"Tú, sólo tú" †	Selena	
September 16	"Golpes en el corazón"	Los Tigres del Norte	
September 23	"Golpes en el corazón"	Los Tigres del Norte	
September 30	"Golpes en el corazón"	Los Tigres del Norte	
October 7	"Golpes en el corazón"	Los Tigres del Norte	
October 14	"Golpes en el corazón"	Los Tigres del Norte	
October 21	"Golpes en el corazón"	Los Tigres del Norte	
October 28	"Si nos dejan"	Luis Miguel	
November 4	"Golpes en el corazón"	Los Tigres del Norte	
November 11	"Golpes en el corazón"	Los Tigres del Norte	
November 18	"Cómo te extraño"	Pete Astudillo	
November 25	"Cómo te extraño"	Pete Astudillo	
December 2	"Cómo te extraño"	Pete Astudillo	
December 9	"Cómo te extraño"	Pete Astudillo	
December 16	"Cómo te extraño"	Pete Astudillo	
December 23	"Cómo te extraño"	Pete Astudillo	
December 30	"Cómo te extraño"	Pete Astudillo	
