= Grammy Award for Best Norteño Album =

Music award category

- Awarded for: quality norteño music albums
- Country: United States
- Presented by: National Academy of Recording Arts and Sciences
- First award: 2009
- Final award: 2011
- Website: grammy.com

The Grammy Award for Best Norteño Album was an honor presented to recording artists at the 51st, 52nd and 53rd Grammy Awards (2009–2011) for quality norteño music albums. The Grammy Awards, an annual ceremony that was established in 1958 and originally called the Gramophone Awards, are presented by the National Academy of Recording Arts and Sciences of the United States to "honor artistic achievement, technical proficiency and overall excellence in the recording industry, without regard to album sales or chart position".

Prior to the establishment of the Best Norteño Album category, norteño recordings were eligible to compete in the Best Mexican/Mexican American Album category. The award was discontinued from 2012 in a major overhaul of Grammy categories. In 2011, the Recording Academy announced the retirement of the award category. Beginning in 2012, norteño recordings will be eligible for the newly formed Grammy Award for Best Banda or Norteño Album category.

== Background ==
Prior to the establishment of the Best Norteño Album category, norteño recordings were eligible to compete in the Best Mexican/Mexican American Album category. In 2011, the Recording Academy announced the retirement of the award category. Beginning in 2012, norteño recordings will be eligible for the newly formed Grammy Award for Best Banda or Norteño Album category.

== Recipients ==
Year	Winner(s)	Title	Nominees	Ref.
2009	Los Tigres del Norte	Raíces	Los Palominos for Me Enamore de un Angel; Pesado for Corridos: Defendiendo El Honor; Siggno for Six Pack; Solido for Cuidado	
2010	Los Tigres del Norte	Tu Noche con Los Tigres del Norte	Cumbre Norteña for Dejame Soñar; El Compa Chuy for El Niño de Oro; Los Rieleros del Norte for Pese A Quien le Pese; Los Tucanes de Tijuana for Soy Todo Tuyo	
2011	Intocable	Classic	Angel Fresnillo for Indispensable; Gerardo Ortíz for Ni Hoy Ni Mañana; Pesado for Desde La Cantina Volumen 1; Principez de la Musica Norteña for Intensamente	

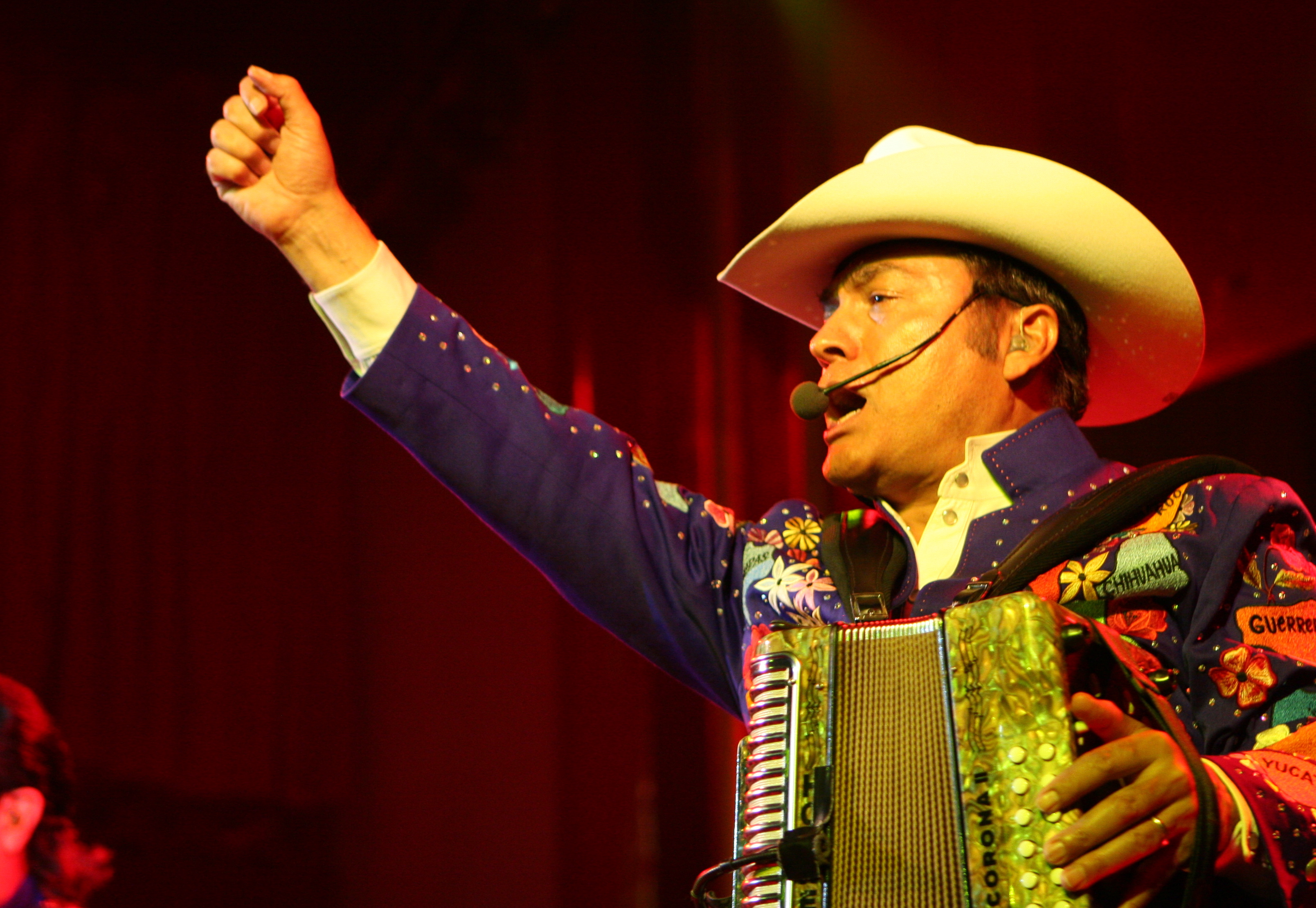
Jorge Hernandez, frontman of the two-time award-winning group Los Tigres del Norte, performing in 2008

For the 51st Grammy Awards (2009), Best Norteño Album nominees included Los Palominos for Me Enamoré de Un Angel, Los Tigres del Norte for Raíces, Pesado for Corridos: Defendiendo el Honor, Siggno for Six Pack, and Solido for Cuidado. Me Enamoré de Un Angel peaked at number 45 on Billboard's Top Latin Albums chart. Awards were presented to members of Los Tigres del Norte as performing artists, including Eduardo Hernandez, Hernan Hernandez, Jorge Hernandez, Luis Hernandez and Oscar Lara Angulo. Alfonso Rodenas and Joseph Pope received awards as engineers/mixers, and members of Los Tigres del Norte were also recognized as producers of the album.

2010 nominees included Cumbre Norteña for Déjame Soñar, El Compa Chuy for El Niño de Oro, Los Rieleros del Norte for Pese a Quien le Pese, Los Tigres del Norte for Tu Noche con Los Tigres del Norte, and Los Tucanes de Tijuana for Soy Todo Tuyo. The award was presented to Los Tigres del Norte for the second consecutive year. Rodenas and Pope were again recognized as engineers of the album as were members of Los Tigres del Norte as producers.

Nominees for the 53rd Grammy Awards included Intocable for Classic. Classic reached peak positions on number three and number eight on Billboard's Regional Mexican Albums and Top Latin Albums charts, respectively. The award was presented to Intocable, members of which included José Juan Hernández, René Martinez, Ricardo J. Muñoz, Johnny Lee Rosas, Félix Salinas, Daniel Sanchez, and Sergio Serna. Additional awards were presented to Alejandro Gulmar, Chuy Flores, Edgar "Pilo" Cavazos, Marco Gamboa and Oscar "Welito" González as the engineers/mixers as well as Ramón Ayala as the producer.

== See also ==
- Latin Grammy Award for Best Norteño Album
