= Realidades =

Realidades may refer to:

- Realidades (TV series), 1970s PBS arts show

== Music ==
- Realidades, es:Realidades, debut album by reggaeton singer Manny Montes
- Realidades, album by Los Tigres del Norte 2014
- "Realidades", song by Nepal from album Ideología 1995
- "Realidades", song by Argentine singer Ariel Nan
