= Camelia la Texana =

American telenovela

- Genre: Telenovela
- Created by: Diego Ramón Bravo
- Developed by: Rodrigo Ordoñez; Hilario Peña; Marcelo Tobar
- Written by: Fernando Ábrego; Larissa Andrade; Fernanda Eguiarte; Tania Tinajero; Anaí López; Natassja Ybarra
- Screenplay by: Diego Ramón Bravo
- Story by: Diego Ramón Bravo
- Directed by: Víctor Herrera McNaught; Javier Solar; Carlos Bolado
- Creative director: Ana Magis
- Starring: Sara Maldonado; Erik Hayser; Andrés Palacios; Dagoberto Gama
- Opening theme: "Contrabando y traición" performed by Los Tigres del Norte
- Country of origin: United States
- Original language: Spanish
- No. of episodes: 60

Production
- Executive producers: Tita Lombardo; Diego Ramón Bravo
- Producers: Epigmenio Ibarra; Verónica Velasco
- Cinematography: Esteban de Llaca; Juan Carlos Lausín; Andrés León Becker
- Editors: Mauricio Báez; Javier Campos
- Camera setup: Multi-camera
- Production company: Campanario Entertainment

Original release
- Network: Telemundo
- Release: February 25 – May 22, 2014

Related
- Santa Diabla; El Señor de los Cielos

Camelia la Texana is a Spanish-language telenovela produced by Campanario Entertainment and Argos Comunicación and distributed by United States–based television network Telemundo Studios, Miami. The story is based on the song titled "Contrabando y Traición" by Los Tigres del Norte.

As part of the 2014 season, Telemundo aired Camelia la Texana from February 25, 2014, to May 22, 2014, weeknights at 10pm/9c, replacing Santa Diabla. As with most of its other telenovelas, the network broadcast English subtitles as closed captions on CC3.

== Synopsis ==
The story of a naive and beautiful young woman who tries to escape her destiny. The story begins in the 1970s when young Camelia and her mother flee one of Mexico's most dangerous capos, Don Antonio. Camelia's beauty attracts a lot of attention, jealousy from other women and infatuation on the part of many men, who fall powerless at her feet. Her mother tries to protect her from the fate that pursues her, but as she sets off in search of adventure Camelia meets the man who will be the love of her life, and also her betrayer: Emilio Varela. Emilio promises Camelia the moon and the stars, but instead he breaks her heart.

== Production ==
The telenovela was shot in Mexico City and filming began in June 2013 and ended in early 2014.

== Cast ==
=== Main ===
- Sara Maldonado as Camelia Pineda "La Texana"
- Erik Hayser as Emilio Varela / Aarón Varela
- Andrés Palacios as Teniente Facundo García
- Dagoberto Gama as Don Antonio Treviño

==== Secondary ====
- Luis Ernesto Franco as Gerardo Robles "El Alacrán"
- Arcelia Ramírez as Ignacia "La Nacha"
- Eréndira Ibarra as Alison Bailow de Varela
- Rodrigo Oviedo as Dionisio Osuna
- Claudette Maillé as Rosaura Pineda
- Tamara Mazarraza as Lu Treviño
- Estefania Villarreal as Mireya Osuna
- Víctor Alfredo Jiménez as Xiang Treviño
- Peter Theis as Carson
- Iñaki Goci as Jacinto Garabito
- Ana Paula de León as Alma Treviño
- Cosmo González Muñoz as Emilio Varela Bailow, Jr.
- Joaquín Garrido as Arnulfo Navarro

=== Recurring ===
- Liz Gallardo as Concepción Olvera "La Cuquis"
- Bárbara Singer as Ofelia Osuna
- Arnulfo Reyes Sánchez as Teniente Pedro Ruìz
- Alejandro Belmonte as Salvador "Chava"
- Germán Valdés III as Ricardo "Rico"

=== Guest ===
- Danna García as Rosa
- Paco Mauri as Timoteo Treviño

== Awards and nominations ==
Year	Award	Category	Nominated	Result
2014	Premios Tu Mundo			
2014	Premios Tu Mundo	Best Bad Luck Moment	Camelia la Texana	Nominated
