= Grammy Award for Best Banda or Norteño Album =

Music award category

- Awarded for: quality vocal or instrumental banda or norteño albums
- Country: United States
- Presented by: National Academy of Recording Arts and Sciences
- First award: 2012
- Final award: 2012
- Website: grammy.com

The Grammy Award for Best Banda or Norteño Album was an award presented at the 2012 Grammy Awards, but was discontinued after that.

When established in 2012, the award was the result of a major restructuring of Grammy categories, announced in 2011. It was the Recording Academy's wish to decrease the list of categories and awards, as the list had grown to well over 100 awards by 2011. According to the Academy, "it was determined that musical distinctions among some of the regional Mexican subgenres were often very difficult to draw, so the restructuring in categories was warranted". This award combined the previous categories for Best Banda Album and Best Norteno Album. Other Latin categories were also either merged or discontinued.

Further restructuring took place in 2012 (and was implemented in the 2013 Grammy Award season). According to the Academy, "Best Banda or Norteño Album and Best Regional Mexican or Tejano Album are now merged into one category: Best Música Mexicana Album (including Tejano), for albums containing at least 51 percent playing time of new vocal or instrumental regional Mexican (banda, norteño, corridos, gruperos, mariachi, ranchera, and Tejano) recordings." As a result, the Best Banda or Norteño Album category was discontinued.

== Recipients ==
Year	Performing artist	Work	Nominees	Ref.
2012	Los Tigres Del Norte	Los Tigres del Norte and Friends	El Guero & Su Banda Centenario — Estaré mejor; Intocable — Intocable 2011; Los Tucanes de Tijuana — El Arbol; Michael Salgado — No Vengo A Ver Si Puedo...Si Por Que Puedo Vengo	

== See also ==
- Grammy Award for Best Regional Mexican or Tejano Album
- Grammy Award for Best Latin Pop, Rock or Urban Album
- Grammy Award for Best Tropical Latin Album
