= Gracias!... América... Sin Fronteras =

Studio album by Los Tigres del Norte
- Released: December 27, 1986
- Genre: Norteño
- Label: Fonovisa; Universal; Melody; Musivisa; Profono Internacional

Los Tigres del Norte chronology
| El Otro Mexico (1986) | Gracias!... América... Sin Fronteras (1986) | Idolos del Pueblo (1988) |

Singles from Gracias!... América... Sin Fronteras
- 1. "América" Released: 1986; 2. "La Puerta Negra" Released: 1986; 3. "Mi Distrito Federal" Released: 1987

Gracias!... América... Sin Fronteras (Thank You America, Without Borders) is a studio album released by Regional Mexican band Los Tigres del Norte. It was released on December 27, 1986 by Fonovisa Records. The album became their third number-one set in the Billboard Regional Mexican Albums chart and earned the Grammy Award for Best Mexican-American Performance at the 30th Grammy Awards.

== Track listing ==
1. América – 3:02
2. Sin Fronteras – 2:40
3. La Puerta Negra – 3:26
4. Flores de Mi País – 3:09
5. Paso a Paso – 2:10
6. El Dorado – 3:50
7. Los Hijos de Hernández – 3:53
8. Popurri Mexicano: México Lindo/Yo Soy Mexicano/Como México No Hay Dos – 3:54
9. Ay, Ay, Hay... – 2:53
10. El Macho y el Hombre – 2:39
11. Amigo Querido – 3:11
12. Mi Distrito Federal – 3:02

== Chart performance ==
| Chart (1987) | Peak position |
|---|---|
| US Billboard Regional Mexican Albums | 1 |

== See also ==
- List of number-one Billboard Regional Mexican Albums from the 1980s
