= Somos Más Americanos =

Song by Los Tigres del Norte

from the album Uniendo Fronteras
- Released: 2001
- Genre: Norteño

"Somos Más Americanos" (transl. "We Are More American") is a Norteño song performed by the Mexican and Californian group Los Tigres del Norte. Released in 2001, the song first appeared on the album Uniendo Fronteras. With lyrics told from the perspective of an undocumented immigrant in the United States, living in lands previously part of Mexico, the song has become an immigrant anthem and was included by Rolling Stone on its 2025 list of "The 250 Greatest Songs of the 21st Century So Far".

== Lyrics ==
The lyrics are written from the perspective of an undocumented Mexican immigrant living in the United States and reacting to Americans telling him "I should go back to my country because there's no room for me here." Referencing the fact that eight of United States (including Texas, California, Colorado, and Arizona) were previously part of Mexico, the song reminds "the gringos" that, "I didn't cross the border, the border crossed to me", noting that "they marked a line" so that "I'm a foreigner in my own land" and now they call me an "invader". The chorus asserts:

We are more American

We are more American

than the children of the Anglo-Saxons.

== Reviews ==
On its release, Mario Tarradell of The Dallas Morning News called it "the most powerful" song on the album, "a jaunty, polka-style track drenched in accordion."

== Legacy ==
In 2011, a live version was recorded for MTV Unplugged: Los Tigres del Norte and Friends featuring Zack de la Rocha.

In 2015, the Mexican rock band Maná covered the song in a "rock-guitar-meets-Mexican-polka" style. A review of the song in the Los Angeles Times wrote that the song "serves as an anthem to immigrants in the United States."

At the Latin Grammy Awards in November 2015, Maná and Los Tigres del Norte performed the song together. At the end of the performance, the groups unfurled a Spanish-language banner translated as "Latinos United, Don't Vote for racists." The Los Angeles Times called the song a "rousing immigrant anthem".

During his time as President of Mexico, Andrés Manuel López Obrador frequently cited the song to counter anti-immigrant rhetoric from American politicians.

During the Presidency of Donald Trump, the song was described as a "cultural battle hymn" on behalf of undocumented immigrants.

In January 2025, amid a diplomatic dispute between Colombia and the United States, Colombian President Gustavo Petro posted a video of the song accompanied by the question, "Who is the invader?"

In October 2025, the song was ranked at No. 185 on the Rolling Stone list of "The 250 Greatest Songs of the 21st Century So Far".
