= MTV Unplugged: Los Tigres del Norte and Friends =

Live album by Los Tigres del Norte
- Released: May 24, 2011
- Recorded: February 8, 2011 at the Hollywood Palladium, Los Angeles, California
- Genre: Norteño
- Language: Spanish
- Label: Fonovisa
- Producers: Gustavo Borner, Los Tigres del Norte

Los Tigres del Norte chronology
La Granja (2009)	MTV Unplugged: Los Tigres del Norte and Friends (2011)	Realidades (2014)

Singles from MTV Unplugged: Los Tigres del Norte and Friends
- 1. "Golpes en el Corazón" Released: April 19, 2011; 2. "La Jaula de Oro" Released: August 15, 2011; 3. "América" Released: October 20, 2011

MTV Unplugged: Los Tigres del Norte and Friends is a live album by Regional Mexican band Los Tigres del Norte. It was recorded before a live audience at the Hollywood Palladium in Los Angeles, California, on February 8, 2011 and released by Fonovisa Records on May 24, 2011. The album includes featured performances by Andrés Calamaro, Calle 13, Zack de la Rocha, Juanes, Paulina Rubio and Diego Torres.

The album became a commercial success peaking at the top of the Mexican Albums Chart, entering the top five on the Billboard Top Latin Albums in the United States, and also being the twenty-third number 1 album by the band in the Regional Mexican Albums chart. It was certified Diamond+Gold by the Mexican Asociación Mexicana de Productores de Fonogramas y Videogramas. To promote the album, Los Tigres del Norte released "Golpes en el Corazón", first included in their album El Ejemplo (1995), and re-recorded for the live album with fellow Mexican singer Paulina Rubio. "La Jaula de Oro" (featuring Colombian singer-songwriter Juanes) and "América" (featuring René Pérez of the band Calle 13), were released as second and third singles, respectively.

Hailed as the first MTV Unplugged recording for the Regional Mexican genre and as a significant release for the Mexican music scene, the album earned a Latin Grammy Award for Best Norteño Album at the 12th Latin Grammy Awards, and a Grammy Award for Best Banda or Norteño Album.

== Background ==
In December 2010, Jason Lipshutz of Billboard magazine reported that Los Tigres del Norte was set to record a MTV Unplugged album for MTV Tr3s. The album was to be taped in the first quarter of 2011, and would feature special guests including Juanes, Calle 13, Andrés Calamaro and Zack de la Rocha. By February 2011, it was announced that Paulina Rubio and Diego Torres would join the band for the album recording session. For the band this presented a unique opportunity to re-invent their music and share the stage with talented performers. "When MTV invited us to record the show, we were a little tense, this was something different for us because Unplugged albums on MTV are usually recorded by artists from different genres from us," the band said about the recording. Jesús Lara of MTV Tr3s called the production "historic", since the band has been culturally a part of the life of the Hispanic community in Mexico and the US.

== Recording, repertoire and release ==
Los Tigres del Norte "Golpes en el Corazón" (2011)
A sample of "Golpes en el Corazón", a remake of the 1995 song which features Paulina Rubio with an orchestra arrangement.

Los Tigres del Norte recorded their performance on February 8, 2011, at the Hollywood Palladium in Los Angeles, California. Invitations to the event were issued to fans through MTV's website starting January 27, 2011. The audience waited four hours before the show started. In preparation to the show, the band sent a list of their songs to the featured performers and asked them to choose the song that better fit their own repertoire. The band performed twenty songs during the show, releasing only twelve on the standard edition of the album, and thirteen on the deluxe version.

The first song was "Jefe de Jefes", followed by "Camelia La Texana", "Señor Locutor", "Contrabando y Traición" and "Cuestión Olvidada". When the band started to play "Mi Curiosidad" and "Una Camioneta Gris", Jorge Hernandez, the band lead member, asked the audience to clap their hands. Paulina Rubio was the first guest to appear and perform "Golpes en el Corazón", with an orchestral arrangement written by Marcelo Wilson. Diego Torres joined afterwards to share lead vocals on "Mi Buena Suerte". "La Puerta Negra", "Prisión de Amor" and "Lágrimas del Corazón" followed.

The band and Andrés Calamaro recorded two tracks: "La Mesa del Rincón" and "Quiero Volar Contigo", the former to the rhythm of tango (with three violins and a cello), and for the latter, Calamaro played marimba and changed the original rhythm of the song to cha-cha-cha. This performance had to be re-taped since there was a technical failure. Zack de la Rocha performed "Somos Más Americanos", while Juanes played guitar on "La Jaula de Oro", a song he had to "rehearse many times". De la Rocha recorded his part twice, incorporating more Spanish lyrics on the second take. Juanes and De la Rocha were the only featured performers selected for their work for immigration rights in the United States, a social cause important to the band. The final song recorded was "América"; the band shared the stage with Calle 13 who, by request of their lead member René Pérez, changed the instrumentation, quickened the tempo and added trumpets and violins. The costumes the band wore on the show were donated to the Hard Rock Cafe in Los Angeles after the show.

== Singles ==
The new recorded version of the song "Golpes en el Corazón", featuring Paulina Rubio, was selected as the first single from the album and was released on April 19, 2011. The original version of the track can be found on the Tigres' studio album El Ejemplo (1995). Upon release it peaked at number 2 in the Billboard Top Latin Songs. The version featuring Rubio was named "one of the most pleasant songs" included on MTV Unplugged by About.com. The Los Angeles Times referred to it as a "sea of lush Latin pop", with Rubio sounding like Julieta Venegas in a "parallel universe". This version became very successful in Mexico, peaking atop the Monitor Latino general charts and the Mexican Airplay Chart from Billboard International. The track also reached number 39 on the Billboard Top Latin Songs, number 31 on the Regional/Mexican Airplay, and was the first song by the band to appear on the Latin Pop Airplay chart, reaching number 29. At the 12th Latin Grammy Awards, the song received a nomination for Record of the Year, losing to Calle 13's "Latinoamérica". Rubio joined the band at the Latin Grammy ceremony to perform the song.

"La Jaula de Oro" was selected as the second single from the album. The track, recognized as one of the band's signature songs, features Colombian singer Juanes performing and playing guitar and was named "one of the best tracks and guest performances in the whole album" by About.com. With this release the record label sought to reach a younger audience for Los Tigres del Norte. "América" was the third single released which reached number five on the Monitor Latino general chart.

== Critical reception and accolades ==
Professional ratings
Review scores
Source	Rating
About.com	5/5 stars
AllMusic	4/5 stars
Los Angeles Times	3/4 stars

An advance copy of the performance was sent to the media a few days before the first showing on MTV Tr3s. Spanish news agency EFE announced that the band was celebrating "Latino pride more vigorously than ever." Another positive review came from the Los Angeles Times, which awarded the album three out of four stars. At the review, the newspaper named the album "one of the most anticipated Latin albums of the year", highlighting that it is the first MTV Unplugged album of the Regional-Mexican genre. They also praised the band for their performance on the first track, "Jefe de Jefes". About the guest performances by Andrés Calamaro, Juanes and Diego Torres, stated that they were "intriguing". Carlos Quintana of About.com hailed the show as an important music event for the Latin music, emphasizing that this recording would allow Regional-Mexican music to gain new audiences around the world. AllMusic reviewer Mariano Prunes named bassist Hernán Hernández, the "musical heart of the band", especially when joining Zack de la Rocha, playing the riff of Rage Against the Machine's "Killing in the Name". He also praised "América" for the participation of Calle 13 with their "razor-sharp rap" intervention. Prunes also stated that MTV Unplugged would get Los Tigres a deserved recognition outside their own community. The participation by De La Rocha was also subject of a negative review by Oscar Barajas of The Young Folks. Barajas noted that De La Rocha sounded "out of place" on "Somos Mas Americanos", trying to turn the track into a rendition of his own song "Bulls on Parade". Barajas also was critical of the song selection, but eventually lauded the album for being "lean and mean", with a musical urgency almost comparable to the Ramones.

MTV Unplugged: Los Tigres del Norte and Friends earned the Latin Grammy Award for Best Norteño Album at the 2011 ceremony. The album also was awarded the Grammy Award for Best Banda or Norteño Album at the 54th Grammy Awards, and the awards for Best Popular Album and Best Norteño Album at the Mexican Premios Oye!.

== Track listing ==
This track listing adapted from the liner notes.

No.	Title	Writer(s)	Length
1.	"Jefe de Jefes"	Teodoro Bello	3:24
2.	"Contrabando y Traición"	Angel González	3:52
3.	"Golpes en el Corazón" (featuring Paulina Rubio)	Víctor Valencia	4:41
4.	"La Manzanita"	Tomás Gutiérrez	3:09
5.	"Mi Buena Suerte" (featuring Diego Torres)	Enrique Franco	3:41
6.	"Lágrimas del Corazón"	Rafael Rubio	4:09
7.	"La Puerta Negra"	Ramón Gutiérrez	4:29
8.	"La Mesa del Rincón" (featuring Andrés Calamaro)	Bello	5:07
9.	"Quiero Volar Contigo" (featuring Andrés Calamaro)	Jesse Armenta	3:50
10.	"Somos Más Americanos" (featuring Zack de la Rocha)	Enrique Valencia	4:10
11.	"La Jaula de Oro" (featuring Juanes)	Franco	3:02
12.	"América" (featuring Calle 13)	Franco, René Pérez, Rafael Arcaute, Eduardo Cabra	4:42

iTunes Store (Deluxe edition)
No.	Title	Writer(s)	Length
13.	"La Camioneta Gris"	Rubén Villarreal	3:05

DVD track listing
No.	Title	Writer(s)	Length
1.	"Intro"		0:33
2.	"Jefe de Jefes"	Teodoro Bello	3:29
3.	"Contrabando y Traición"	Angel González	4:09
4.	"Golpes en el Corazón" (featuring Paulina Rubio)	Víctor Valencia	5:11
5.	"La Manzanita"	Tomás Gutiérrez	3:16
6.	"Mi Buena Suerte" (featuring Diego Torres)	Enrique Franco	4:04
7.	"Lágrimas del Corazón"	Rafael Rubio	4:17
8.	"La Puerta Negra"	Ramón Gutiérrez	4:41
9.	"La Mesa del Rincón" (featuring Andrés Calamaro)	Bello	5:24
10.	"Quiero Volar Contigo" (featuring Andrés Calamaro)	Jesse Armenta	3:59
11.	"Somos Más Americanos" (featuring Zack de la Rocha)	Enrique Valencia	4:54
12.	"La Jaula de Oro" (featuring Juanes)	Franco	3:41
13.	"América" (featuring Calle 13)	Franco, René Pérez, Rafael Arcaute, Eduardo Cabra	4:43
14.	"Credits"		1:10
15.	"Interviews"		5:28

== Commercial performance ==
The album debuted and peaked at number 3 on the Billboard Top Latin Albums chart, behind Maná's Drama y Luz and Prince Royce's self-titled debut album. MTV Unplugged became the band's twenty-third number 1 album in the Regional Mexican Albums chart. In the Mexican Albums Chart the album debuted at number 92, before jumping to number 2, behind Lady Gaga's Born This Way. The following week the album surpassed Gaga's set and peaked at number 1 in Mexico and also reached the top of the charts in Colombia. The album spent seventeen consecutive weeks at the top of the Mexican chart, received a Diamond+Gold certification by the Asociación Mexicana de Productores de Fonogramas y Videogramas and ended the year as the best-selling album of 2011 in Mexico. The album was certified gold in Colombia by the Asociación Colombiana de Productores de Fonogramas.

== Charts and certifications ==
=== Charts ===
Chart (2011)	Peak position
Colombian Albums Chart	1
Mexican Albums Chart	1
Spanish Albums Chart	94
US Billboard Top Latin Albums	3
US Billboard Regional Mexican Albums	1
US Billboard 200	134

=== Certifications ===
Region	Certification	Certified units/sales
Colombia	Gold	
Mexico (AMPROFON)	Diamond+Gold	330,000^{^}
^{^} Shipments figures based on certification alone.

=== Year-end charts ===
Chart (2011)	Position
Mexican Albums Chart	1
US Billboard Latin Albums	23
US Billboard Regional Mexican Albums	6

Chart (2012)	Position
Mexican Albums Chart	63
US Billboard Latin Albums	56

== Personnel ==
- Los Tigres del Norte – main performers, producers, vocals
- Gustavo Borner – producer, recording engineer, mixing, mastering
- Pablo Castro – arrangements
- Marcelo Wilson – arrangements
- Ezequiel Alara – musical director, piano
- Miguel Ramirez – percussion
- Karl Perazzo – percussion
- Enzo Villparedes – trumpet
- Arturo Solar – trumpet
- Roberto Incelli – sax
- Humbero Ruiz – trombone
- Edwin Blas – trombone
- Peter Kent – violin
- Sharon Jackson – violin
- Jessica VanVelzen – viola
- Giovanna Clayton – cello
- Ricky Perry – graphic design

== See also ==
- 2011 in Latin music
- List of number-one albums of 2011 (Mexico)
- Music of Mexico
