= Tu Noche con Los Tigres del Norte =

Tu Noche con...

Live album by Los Tigres del Norte
- Released: November 24, 2008
- Genre: Norteño
- Label: Fonovisa

Los Tigres del Norte chronology
Raíces (2008)	Tu Noche con... (2008)	La Granja (2009)

Tu Noche con Los Tigres del Norte is a 2009 live album by Regional Mexican band Los Tigres del Norte. This album won a 52nd Annual GRAMMY Award® for Best Norteno Album.

== Tracks ==
1. Intro
2. Somos Mas Americanos - (Uniendo Fronteras)
3. Los Dos Plebes - (Los Dos Plebes)
4. Cuestion Olvidada - (Unidos Para Siempre)
5. Mis Dos Patrias - (Jefe de Jefes)
6. Ayudame A Creer - (Pacto De Sangre)
7. Cesar Chavez - (Triunfo Solido)
8. Sangre Caliente - (Raices)
9. La Dieta - (Incansables!)
10. Me Regalo Contigo - (La Reina Del Sur)
11. Tres Veces Mojado - (Idolos Del Pueblo)
12. El Niño Y La Boda - (Idolos Del Pueblo)
13. Amigos y Mujeres - (La Garra De..)
14. La Fuga Del Rojo - (El Tahur)
