= Jaula de oro (song) =

"Jaula de Oro"

Song by Los Tigres del Norte

from the album Jaula de Oro
- Language: Spanish
- Recorded: 1983
- Genre: Norteño
- Length: 2:47
- Label: Fonovisa
- Songwriter(s): Enrique Franco

"Jaula de oro" ("Golden cage") is a 1983 corrido or cancion ranchera by Enrique Franco, performed by Los Tigres del Norte on the album Jaula de Oro. The subject of the song is US immigration.

Los Tigres del Norte re-recorded the song with Juanes for MTV Unplugged: Los Tigres del Norte and Friends in 2011.

== Lyrics ==
A translation of the lyrics begins as follows: "I have my wife and children whom I brought at a very young age. They no longer remember my beloved Mexico, which I never forget and to which I can never return. What good is money if I am like a prisoner in this great nation?"

The song inspired the 1987 Mexican film La jaula de oro and also the 2013 film The Golden Dream.
