= La Reina del Sur (album) =

Studio album by Los Tigres del Norte
- Released: October 29, 2002
- Genre: Norteño
- Label: Fonovisa

Los Tigres del Norte chronology
Uniendo Fronteras (2001)	La Reina del Sur (2002)	Pacto de Sangre (2004)

Professional ratings
Review scores
Source	Rating
AllMusic	4/5 stars

La Reina del Sur (Eng.: Queen of the South) is a studio album by Regional Mexican band Los Tigres del Norte. The album became their third number-one hit on the Billboard Top Latin Albums chart and received a nomination for a Grammy Award for Best Mexican/Mexican-American Album.

== Track listing ==
Adapted from Billboard.

1. La Reina del Sur (Teodoro Bello) – 4:04
2. Gavilán Perdido (Paulino Vargas) – 3:40
3. Con Tus Mismas Palabras (Rafael Rubio) – 3:41
4. Mi Soldado (Enrique Valencia) – 3:27
5. Mira, Mira, Mira (Enrique Negrete Rincón) – 3:35
6. ¿En Qué Fallé? (Negrete) – 3:49
7. Me Regalo Contigo (Bello) – 3:06
8. El Artista Toscano (Manuel Eduardo Norberto) – 3:14
9. ¿De Que Color Es la Suerte? (Vargas) – 3:32
10. No Merezco Tus Lagrimas (Ramón Meléndez) – 3:09
11. Cáusame la Muerte (Juan Meza) – 3:24
12. Lo Felicito Amigo (Manuel Eduardo Toscano) – 3:53
13. Platos de Segunda Mesa (Bello) – 2:47
14. El Fin del Mundo (Bello) – 3:39

== Personnel ==
Adapted from AllMusic.

- Jim Dean – Engineer
- Eduardo Hernández – Arranger, art direction
- Andrew Mendelson – Mastering
- Joseph Pope – Assistant engineer
- Raz Kennedy – Collaboration
- Rafael Rubio – Collaboration
- Christian Besson – Photography
- Bill Hernández – Wardrobe

== Charts ==
Chart (2002)	Peak position
US Billboard 200	54
US Billboard Top Latin Albums	1
US Billboard Regional/Mexican Albums	1
US Billboard Top Independent Albums	2

== Sales and certifications ==
Region	Certification	Certified units/sales
Mexico (AMPROFON)	Platinum	150,000^{^}
^{^} Shipments figures based on certification alone.
