= Realidades (album) =

Studio album by Los Tigres del Norte
- Released: October 7, 2014
- Genre: Norteño
- Label: Fonovisa

Los Tigres del Norte chronology
MTV Unplugged: Los Tigres Del Norte And Friends (2011)	Realidades (2014)	Desde el Azteca (2015)

Professional ratings
Review scores
Source	Rating
Allmusic	4/5 stars

Realidades (Eng.: Realities) is the title of a studio album released by Regional Mexican band Los Tigres del Norte. Realidades (Deluxe Edition) won a Grammy Award for Best Regional Mexican Music Album (including Tejano).

Pre-production started in the spring of 2014. Realidades and Realidades (Deluxe Edition) reached Billboard's Latin charts. The hit single “La Bala” (The Bullet) was a follow-up to the 2011 MTV Unplugged album.

== Recognition ==
Realidades (Deluxe Edition) won the Grammy Award for Best Regional Mexican Music Album (including Tejano) at the 58th Grammy Awards.

In 2015, “Era Diferente” (She Was Different) received the Special Recognition (Spanish Language) Award at the 26th annual GLAAD Media Awards.

== Track listing ==
No.	Title	Length
1.	"La Bala"	3:18
2.	"Qué Tal Si Eres Tú"	3:00
3.	"Hoy Le Hablo A Dirrio"	3:06
4.	"Amarte Me Hace Bien"	3:38
5.	"El Gallo Del Mojado"	3:25
6.	"Era Diferente"	3:01
7.	"Así Es El Amor"	3:22
8.	"La Puerta Del Rancho"	3:08
9.	"Necesitamos Conversar"	3:15
10.	"La Hija, La Mamá"	3:01
11.	"La Jefa Del Jefe"
Total length:		36:12

Deluxe Edition bonus tracks
No.	Title	Length
12.	"Me Siguen Llamando El Jefe"	3:13
13.	"Se Me Acabó El Tequila"	3:48
14.	"Nomás Cuando Estoy Sin Ti"	2:54
15.	"Historia De Amor"	3:59
16.	"Ojalá"	3:19
17.	"La Guardería"	3:24
Total length:		20:37

== Credits ==
- Alfonso Ródenas: Engineer
- Hernán Hernández: Band
- Jorge Hernández: Band
- Luis Hernández: Band
- Oscar Lara: Band
- Joseph Pope: Recording Assistant
- Brian (Bt) Gibbs: Recording Assistant

== Charts ==
=== Weekly charts ===
Chart (2014)	Peak position
US Billboard 200	130
US Top Latin Albums (Billboard)	2
US Regional Mexican Albums (Billboard)	1

=== Year-end charts ===
Chart (2014)	Position
US Top Latin Albums (Billboard)	40
Chart (2015)	Position
US Top Latin Albums (Billboard)	62
