= El Ejemplo =

Studio album by Los Tigres del Norte
- Released: May 2, 1995
- Genre: Norteño
- Length: 44:19
- Language: Spanish
- Label: Fonovisa
- Producer: Eduardo Hernández

Los Tigres del Norte chronology
Los Dos Plebes (1994)	El Ejemplo (1995)	Unidos Para Siempre (1996)

Singles from El Ejemplo
- 1. "La Fama de la Pareja" Released: 1995; 2. "El Ejemplo" Released: 1995; 3. "Golpes en el Corazón" Released: 1995; 4. "No Puedo Más" Released: 1996

El Ejemplo (The Example) is a studio album by Regional Mexican band Los Tigres del Norte. It was released by Fonovisa Records on May 2, 1995, and includes fourteen tracks written by Teodoro Bello and Enrique Valencia, which span song styles such as ballads, boleros, corridos, cumbias and rancheras.

The album was a commercial success peaking at number eight in the Billboard Top Latin Albums in the United States, where it was certified Gold by the Recording Industry Association of America. To promote the album, Los Tigres del Norte released four singles, "La Fama de la Pareja", the title track and "Golpes en el Corazón" that reached top ten in the Billboard Hot Latin Songs, while the single "No Puedo Más" peaked at number 15 in the same chart. "Golpes en el Corazón", was later included in the setlist of their live album MTV Unplugged: Los Tigres del Norte and Friends as a duet with Mexican singer Paulina Rubio.

== Release and reception ==
Professional ratings
Review scores
Source	Rating
AllMusic	4/5 stars
Billboard	positive

Mexican band Los Tigres del Norte released their twenty-sixth studio album titled El Ejemplo on May 2, 1995. The album included twelve tracks written by Teodoro Bello and two songs written by Enrique Valencia. Four corridos ("El Tamal", "Tiempos de Mayo", "La Fama de la Pareja" and "Morir Matando"), seven rancheras ("El Ejemplo", "Devuélveme", "No Puedo Más", "Quién", "Como Aceite y Como el Agua", "Un Mar de Vino" and "Te He de Olvidar"), one cumbia ("Me Quedas a la Medida"), one ballad ("Golpes en el Corazón") and one bolero ("Nos Estorbó la Ropa") were recorded. The website AllMusic gave the album four stars out of five. Billboard magazine named the album a "likable batch of moving anecdotal corridos, spirited rancheras, and a pair of ballads that would be superb singles: 'Golpes en el Corazón' and 'Nos Estorbó la Ropa'." The first single "La Fama de la Pareja" also received praise, being referred to as a "highlight" of the album.

== Singles ==
"Golpes en el Corazón"
"Golpes en el Corazón" became the greatest hit from the album El Ejemplo peaking at the top of the Billboard Regional Mexican Songs chart.

The album lead single "La Fama de la Pareja" ("The Fame of the Couple"), a corrido about a husband and wife dedicated to contraband and drug trafficking, peaked at number five in the Billboard Top Latin Songs chart and at number four in the Regional Mexican Songs chart. The title track was selected as the second single, and is a ranchera track about a love relationship that ended and the impossibility of getting a divorce, staying married for the sake of their children. "El Ejemplo" ("The Example") reached number six at the Billboard Hot Latin Songs and three at the Regional Mexican Songs charts, respectively. "Golpes en el Corazón" ("Punches to the Heart") was released as third single and became the biggest hit of the album, peaking at number two in the Billboard Hot Latin Songs chart for a month (blocked at the top by "Tú, sólo tú" by Selena and "Si nos dejan" by Luis Miguel for two weeks each). "Golpes en el Corazón", about a failed love relationship, spent eight non-consecutive weeks at the top of the Regional Mexican Songs chart and at the Broadcast Music, Inc. awards of 1997 won the Latin Song of the Year award. It was also nominated Regional Mexican Song of the Year at the 1996 Lo Nuestro Awards. The track regained interest when was included in the setlist for the MTV Unplugged: Los Tigres del Norte and Friends recorded by the band in 2011 with the participation of Mexican singer Paulina Rubio. This version was nominated for Record of the Year at the 12th Latin Grammy Awards ceremony. "No Puedo Más" ("I Can't Take it Anymore") was chosen as the fourth and last single, peaking at number 15 in the Billboard Top Latin Songs and at number nine in the Regional Mexican Songs charts, respectively.

== Track listing ==
No.	Title	Writer(s)	Length
1.	"El Tamal (The Tamal)"	Teodoro Bello	3:06
2.	"El Ejemplo (The Example)"	Bello	2:55
3.	"Devuélveme (Give Me Back)"	Bello	2:45
4.	"Tiempos de Mayo (Times of May)"	Enrique Valencia	3:30
5.	"Golpes en el Corazón (Punches to the Heart)"	Valencia	3:48
6.	"La Fama de la Pareja (The Fame of the Couple)"	Bello	2:59
7.	"No Puedo Mas (I Can't Take it Anymore)"	Bello	3:00
8.	"Morir Matando (Dying Killing)"	Bello	3:15
9.	"Quién (Who)"	Bello	3:24
10.	"Como Aceite y Como el Agua (Like Oil and Like Water)"	Bello	3:28
11.	"Un Mar de Vino (A Sea of Wine)"	Bello	2:55
12.	"Te He de Olvidar (I Will Forget You)"	Bello	2:28
13.	"Me Quedas a la Medida (You Were Made for Me)"	Bello	3:24
14.	"Nos Estorbó la Ropa (Our Clothes Were an Obstacle)"	Bello	3:22

== Chart performance ==
El Ejemplo debuted and peaked at number eight in the Billboard Top Latin Albums chart in the week of May 13, 1995, being the second highest debut of the week after Cuando los Ángeles Lloran by Maná at number seven. The album reached a peak of number two in the Regional Mexican Albums chart in the week of September 16, 1995, being held at the top by Selena's Amor Prohibido. The band earned the Regional Mexican Album of the Year, Duo or Group Award at the Billboard Latin Music Awards of 1996. El Ejemplo was the 20th bestselling Latin album of 1995 in the United States and was certified Gold by the Recording Industry Association of America, the first for the band. By 1999, the album had sold over 650,000 copies.

== Sales and certifications ==
Region	Certification	Certified units/sales
United States (RIAA)	Gold	500,000^{^}
^{^} Shipments figures based on certification alone.

== See also ==
- 1995 in Latin music
