= Contrabando y traición =

Song

“Contrabando y traición” ("Contraband and Betrayal") is the name of a Mexican song, also called "Camelia, la tejana,” whose lyrics were written by Ángel González in 1972. The song achieved popular success when it was performed by Los Tigres del Norte and included in their album of the same name in 1974. This particular song is seen as being responsible for the ensuing popularity of the narcocorrido, and the revitalization of the corrido itself in Mexico.

== Lyrics ==
According to its author, Ángel González, the story of the song is fictional although it does incorporate the real names of people involved in drug trafficking. The story follows a drug trafficking romantic couple - Emilio Varela and Camelia la Texana – who transport several kilos of marijuana hidden in their car's tires from Tijuana, Mexico to Los Angeles, United States. After getting paid for their delivery Emilio tells Camelia he is going to leave her for his true love and move to San Francisco. Camelia feels betrayed so she shoots Emilio (with 7 bullets) and takes all of the money for herself. The story is thus not only one about drug trafficking but also about love and loyalty.

== Adaptations ==
In 1975, Ángel González also wrote the related song “Ya encontraron a Camelia,” which was also recorded by Los Tigres del Norte and was included on their album La Banda Del Carro Rojo (1975).

In 1975 the film Contrabando y traición (Camelia la Texana) was filmed, directed by Arturo Martínez who adapted the script from the story of the song. The film starred Valentín Trujillo Gazcón and Ana Luisa Peluffo. In 1976, Arturo Martínez filmed a sequel, Mataron a Camelia la Texana, again starring Ana Luisa Peluffo.

In 2002, the Spanish writer Arturo Pérez-Reverte published the novel La Reina del Sur. Pérez-Reverte declared that he had written the story of Camelia la Tejana having different adventures —and with the different name of Teresa Mendoza—, but with the same rebellious and disappointed spirit.

"The day I heard Camelia la Tejana's corrido I felt the need to write the lyrics of one of those songs myself. But I have no idea of music, nor can I summarize in a few words perfect stories like the ones this song tells. I lack the talent of Los Tigres del Norte or Los Tucanes de Tijuana, or of Chalino Sánchez, who was a composer, vocalist and gunman for the mafia, and they burned him with gunshots, all exquisitely canonical, when he left a cantina, in Sinaloa, for either drug dealing or because of a woman. Or for both. So, after thinking about the matter a lot, I decided to write five hundred pages and mix two worlds, two borders, two traffics in it."

Los Tigres del Norte correspondingly composed and recorded the song "La Reina del Sur" in 2002, this corrido summarizes in a few stanzas Pérez-Reverte's five-hundred-page novel, which was also recorded as a soap opera with the same title, in 2011.

The Mexican composer Gabriela Ortiz used the story of Camelia and Emilio to make an opera with the title of Únicamente la verdad. This work premiered in Bloomington, Indiana in 2008. It was also presented in Mexico City in 2010 and in Long Beach, California in 2013.

In 2014, Telemundo began broadcasting the telenovela Camelia la Texana starring Sara Maldonado.

== Covers ==
In addition to the version by Los Tigres del Norte, the song has also been covered by Ramon Ayala, Los Aduanales, Los Renegados, Los Allegros de Teran, La Lupita, and Julieta Venegas.
