= La jaula de oro (1987 film) =

1987 Mexican film directed by Sergio Véjar

La jaula de oro is a 1987 Mexican film directed by Sergio Véjar inspired by the song of the same name.

The cast features Mario Almada, Fernando Almada, Cecilia Camacho, Carmen del Valle, Isaura Espinosa, Héctor Sáez, Jorge Hernández Lobo, Hernán Hernández, Raul Hernandez, Katy Rojo (la de las vocales) and Bernabé Melendrez.
