= Polo Urías =

Mexican singer

Leopoldo "Polo" Urías Ramírez (born November 15, 1954) is a Mexican singer-songwriter. He specializes in regional Mexican music; specifically the norteño-sax genre. He is the leader of the band Polo Urías y su Máquina Norteña.

== Early life ==
Urías was born on November 15, 1954, in Ojinaga, Chihuahua, Mexico. He recalls that when he was very young, he would often sing while plowing in the fields with his mules.

== Musical career ==
Polo's professional career started in 1975 as founding member of the band Los Jilgueros del Arroyo along with his brothers, Israel, Alberto, Jesús, and Raúl. Polo served as the bassist. Then in 1985, he joined Los Rieleros del Norte as the band's primary vocalist and bassist. He was also a songwriter. His tenure with said band ended in 1994. One year later, he formed the band Polo Urías y su Máquina Norteña, being the group's lead vocalist and director, as well as occasional songwriter; positions he holds to this day.

Although he resides in El Paso, Texas, the city of Ojinaga has officially honored him for his contributions. He also has impacted the city of Odessa, Texas; leading the former mayor, Larry Melton, to honor him with the key to the city and marking every November 15 as "Polo Urías Day".

Today, Polo Urías y su Máquina Norteña are popular in several regions of México and the United States.

== Personal life ==
Urías has eleven siblings. His sons Aarón and Izaiah have been his band's accordionist and bajo sexto player, respectively for several years. His nephews Adolfo and Rubén are the leaders of their own norteño-sax bands, Adolfo Urías y su Lobo Norteño and Rubén Urías y sus Aliados de Ojinaga.

In 2007, Polo bought a tour bus valued at over $250,000 after his original bus was burned. He and his band had just finished a concert in Utah and were on their way to another gig in Colorado, when near Española, New Mexico, the bus' rear engine caught fire. All members of the band, including Polo, were asleep at the time of the incident, but managed to escape unharmed thanks to a motorist who flagged down the bus driver, José Luis Ávila. In a matter of minutes, the entire bus became engulfed in flames.

In August 2020, Urías suffered from a severe case of COVID-19 and spent several days in intensive care at an El Paso, Texas, hospital. In early 2021, he suffered from a second bout of COVID-19. At the same time, one of his brothers, Jesús Urías, passed away.

== Discography ==
=== With Los Rieleros del Norte ===
- Corazón Cerrado (1985)
- El Regalito (1986)
- Nací Cantando (1987)
- Copa Sin Vino (1988)
- Ya Para Que (1988)
- La Golosa (1989)
- ...En Gira Internacional (1989)
- Castillo de Ilusión (1990)
- Me Lo Contaron Ayer (1991)
- A Toda Máquina (1991)
- Volando Alto (1992)
- Pecado de Amor (1992)
- Vías por Conocer (1993)
- Peor que Nada (1994)

=== As Polo Urías y su Máquina Norteña ===
- Sigue La Aventura (1995)
- Incontenible (1996)
- El Campeon de Campeones (1996)
- A Todo Vapor (1997)
- El Número Uno (1998)
- ¿A Que Te Supo? (1998)
- Mi Historia (2000)
- De Chihuahua Para Ti (2001)
- Sin Frenos (2002)
- Para Mi Raza (2003)
- En La Cumbre (2004)
- Que Barbaros (2005)
- En Vivo - 30 Aniversario (2005)
- Y... Sigue La Máquina Dando (2006)
- A Paso Firme (2008)
- Sigo Siendo El Maestro (2009)
- Grandes Recuerdos de Cantina (2011)
- La Madre de Todas las Máquinas (2013)
- Clásicas de Ayer y Siempre (2014)
- Así de Plano (2021)
- Dos Amigos 4 Historias (2024) (EP featuring Milo Meléndez, another former vocalist of Los Rieleros del Norte)

== See also ==
- Los Rieleros del Norte
