= Cagayan de Oro National High School =

Public high school in Cagayan de Oro, Philippines

- Mataas na Pambansang Paaralan ng Cagayan de Oro (Filipino)

Location
- 8th-2nd Sts., Nazareth; Cagayan de Oro; Philippines
- Coordinates: 8°28′26″N 124°38′58″E

Information
- Type: Public
- Established: August 2, 1965
- Principal: Minda S. Rebollido, Ph. D
- Year Levels: Grade 7 to 11
- Colors: Gold, yellow, and blue
- Mascot: Tiger
- Nickname: City High Tigers
- Hymn: "The Golden Ray"

Cagayan de Oro National High School or City High is a public high school located in Cagayan de Oro, Misamis Oriental, Philippines.

== History ==
Principals of
Cagayan de Oro National High School
Mr. Pedrito C. Acac, 1965 - 1993
Mr. Rogelio Q. Mabao, 1993 - 1997
Ms. Fe L. Pajo, 1997 - ?
Mrs. Enriquieta C. Pabelic, ? - 2012

Dr. Nimfa Regalado Lago -2012–2013

On August 2, 1965, at the heart of City Central School at Velez Street, Cagayan de Oro rose City High School, manned by the school administrator, Mr. Pedrito D. Acac. Part-time faculty members held classes from five o'clock in the afternoon to eight-thirty in the evening daily, and offered non-academic subjects during Saturdays, in a five-year curriculum.

City High School transferred to its new site at 8th-2nd Streets at Barangay Nazareth in 1990 where the DSWD-X and South City Central extension were stationed at that time. By that time, City High School ran day and night sessions, thereby catering not only to the working students, but also to the full-time professionals.

In February 1993, Mr. Rogelio Q. Mabao took over as the school administrator of Cagayan de Oro National High School. During that time, the school offered SEDP, science school for future curricula which brought in its laurel as "The Most Effective and Efficient Secondary Public High School" in the Division of Cagayan de Oro. An annex was opened at Macanhan in 1999 through the initiative of Ms. Fe L. Pajo, the school administrator who assumed office in January 1997. It continued to offer three curricula, namely Revised Basic Education, Special Science Curriculum and Special Education for the deaf students in the city.

Cagayan de Oro maintained its title for two years as "The Most Effective and Efficient Secondary Public High School" in the division from 2001-2003. Five of its teachers were named as "Outstanding Teacher in Division and District" – Ms. Tersita L. Jacobe, Ms. Fe A. Elevado, Ms. Jesusa R. Saloma, Ms. Sandy A. Flores, and Ms. Cristine J. Arjona.

== Curricula ==
The school day is divided into three class shifts – morning, afternoon and night.

Curricula	Sections
Science Technology, Engineering and Mathematics	8
Revised Basic Education	20+
Special Education	1
Technology and Livelihood Education	2

== Information ==
- The school appeared in the local show Mag TV Na Ato Ni!.
- The school appeared in the local news TV Patrol Northern Mindanao
