= Pacto de Sangre (album) =

Studio album by Los Tigres del Norte
- Released: March 30, 2004
- Genre: Norteño
- Label: Fonovisa

Los Tigres del Norte chronology
La Reina del Sur (2003)	Pacto de Sangre (2004)	Directo al Corazón (2005)

Professional ratings
Review scores
Source	Rating
AllMusic	4/5 stars

Pacto de Sangre (Eng.: Pact of Blood) is a studio album by Regional Mexican band Los Tigres del Norte. The album became their fifth number-one set on the Billboard Top Latin Albums chart. Pacto de Sangre was nominated for a Lo Nuestro Award for Regional Mexican Album of the Year.

== Track listing ==
The information from Billboard and Allmusic.

=== CD track listing ===
No.	Title	Writer(s)	Length
1.	"No Tiene la Culpa el Indio"	Francisco Quintero	3:19
2.	"Chin Marín"	Quintero	3:00
3.	"Vale la Pena"	Alberto Chávez	3:01
4.	"Ayúdame a Creer"	Chávez	3:30
5.	"Cumbia Guajira"	Ramón Tomás Gutiérrez	3:09
6.	"Liar, Liar"	Ismael Gallegos	3:18
7.	"El Santo de los Mojados"	Enrique Franco Aguilar	3:25
8.	"Las Mujeres de Juarez"	Paulino Vergas	2:36
9.	"José Pérez León"	José Cantoral	3:55
10.	"La Manzanita"	Gutiérrez	2:23
11.	"El Niño de la Calle"	Luis Torres Canez	3:11
12.	"Va Por Ahí"	Teodoro Bello	3:18
13.	"Montones de Buena Suerte"	Alfredo Garfias	2:49
14.	"Amigo"	Roman Alfredo Padilla	3:03

=== DVD track listing ===
No.	Title	Writer(s)	Length
1.	"José Pérez León"	Cantoral	3:55
2.	"No Tiene La Culpa el Indio"	Quintero	3:19

== Charts ==
Chart (2004)	Peak position
US Billboard 200	75
US Billboard Top Latin Albums	1
US Billboard Regional Mexican Albums	1

== Sales and certifications ==
Region	Certification	Certified units/sales
Mexico (AMPROFON)	Platinum	100,000^{^}
^{^} Shipments figures based on certification alone.
