= Jaula de Oro (album) =

Studio album by Los Tigres del Norte
- Released: February 1984
- Recorded: October – December 1983
- Genre: Norteño
- Length: 32:02
- Label: Fonovisa

Los Tigres del Norte chronology
Carrera Contra La Muerte (1983)	Jaula de Oro (1984)	A ti Madrecita (1985)

Jaula de Oro (Spanish for Cage of Gold) is a studio album by the Mexican norteño group, Los Tigres del Norte, in 1984. It was the first number one on the Billboard Regional Mexican Albums chart.

== Track listing ==
No.	Title	Length
1.	"Jaula de Oro (song)"	2:47
2.	"Que Te Hizo Olvidarme"	2:35
3.	"El Agente del Amor"	3:07
4.	"Mentira"	2:41
5.	"Albacar China"	2:50
6.	"Por Qué Me Quité del Vico"	3:47
7.	"Pedro y Pablo"	3:18
8.	"All Nos Juntamos"	2:58
9.	"El Gallo de San Juan"	3:15
10.	"El Cantante"	3:06
11.	"Te Tengo Que Peder"	3:04
12.	"Brisas de April"	3:19

== Critical reception ==
Professional ratings
Review scores
Source	Rating
AllMusic	4/5 stars

Wilson Neate of AllMusic praised the title track of the album.

== Charts ==
Chart (1984)	Peak position
US Billboard Regional Mexican Album	1
