= Uniendo Fronteras =

Studio album by Los Tigres del Norte
- Released: August 28, 2001
- Genre: Norteño
- Label: Fonovisa

Los Tigres del Norte chronology
De paisano a paisano (2000)	Uniendo Fronteras (2001)	La Reina del Sur (2002)

Professional ratings
Review scores
Source	Rating
AllMusic	3/5 stars

Uniendo Fronteras (Eng.: Uniting Frontiers) is a studio album by Regional Mexican band Los Tigres del Norte. The album became their second number-one hit on the Billboard Top Latin Albums chart.

== Track listing ==
This information from Billboard.com

1. Trabajo Por Mi Cuenta (Francisco Quintero) — 3:13
2. La Luz de Tus Ojos (Teodoro Bello) — 3:08
3. El Que No Había Nacido (Teodoro Bello) — 3:33
4. Y Dices Que Tú Me Amas (Rafael Rubio) — 3:10
5. Mi Fantasía (Enrique Negrete) — 3:27
6. Don Nadie (Jesús Meléndez) — 3:34
7. Somos Más Americanos (Enrique Valencia) — 3:27
8. De Rama en Rama (Teodoro Bello) — 3:34
9. El Curita y la Coqueta (Francisco Quintero) — 3:50
10. Recuerdos Que Duelen (Teodoro Bello) — 3:29
11. El Centroamericano (Enrique Franco) — 3:29
12. Lo Tomas o Lo Tiras (Rafael Rubio) — 3:27
13. Mujeres Manejando (Francisco Quintero) — 3:04
14. La Crónica de un Cambio (Paulino Vargas) — 2:43

== Credits ==
This information from Allmusic

- Jim Dean: Engineer
- Hernán Hernández: Band
- Jorge Hernández: Band
- Luis Hernández: Band
- Oscar Lara: Band
- Rafael Rubio: Collaboration
- John Coulter: Graphic design
- Alan Silfen: Photography

== Chart performance ==
Chart (2001)	Peak position
US Billboard Top Latin Albums	1
US Billboard Regional/Mexican Albums	1
US Billboard Top Independent Albums	7
US Billboard 200	116

== Sales and certifications ==
Region	Certification	Certified units/sales
United States (RIAA)	Gold	500,000^{^}
^{^} Shipments figures based on certification alone.
