= Los Huracanes del Norte =

Mexican band

Los Huracanes del Norte are a regional Mexican band. Throughout their history, they have played different styles of norteño music, such as traditional norteño from northeastern Mexico, rough Norteño from Mexico's pacific northwest, and saxophone norteño popular in Mexico's landlocked states. They are originally from Yahualica de González Gallo, Jalisco, and were raised in Tangancícuaro, Michoacán. They are currently based out of Portales, New Mexico, United States. They are one of regional Mexican music's most famous acts.

They first formed under the name Los Cuatro del Norte in 1969 by three brothers and a fourth member; a fourth brother joined in 1972. Their debut record was released in 1973; they scored their first gold record in 1978. With the growth of their success they toured regularly through the United States, Mexico, and Central America. They continued to release charting records from the 2000s to 2020s. Los Huracanes del Norte have released over 900 songs.

On September 7, 2022, Los Huracanes del Norte were honored with the 2,732nd star on the Hollywood Walk of Fame.

== Members ==
- Don Heraclio "Rocky" García - Electric Bass, Vocals
- Jesús "Chuy" García - Accordion, Vocals
- Guadalupe "Lupillo" García - Saxophone, Accordion, Vocals
- Francisco "Pancho" García - Bajo Sexto, Vocals
- Antonio H. "El Güero" García - Drums
- José Luis "El Chapete" Mejía - Accordion, Vocals
- Heraclio Roberto "Rocky Jr." García - Bajo Sexto, Vocals
- Jaime Jesús "Jaimito" García - Electric Bass, saxophone

== Former members ==
- Raúl "Rury" Rubio - Drums (1969–1979)
- Alejandro "Wico" López - Drums (1983–2001)
- Asunción Rubalcava - Drums, Percussion (1979–1983)

== Other members ==
- Francisco "Panchón" Fellove - Saxophone, Trumpet (finished in 2005)

== Discography ==
Incomplete discography due to lack of information on LPs and later discs

- Corrido de Daniel Treviño (1973) (First album on Luna Music)
- Tambien Cantan Corridos (1974)
- La Gavilla del Burro Prieto (1975)
- Son Tus Perfumenes Mujer (1976)
- Ofrenda a Mi Madre (1977)
- El Lechero (1978)
- El Hijo de La Musiquera (1980)
- Los Meros Meros Meros Meros (1982)
- Paredes de Mi Casa/Como un Cobarde (1983)
- Los Polvos de Estos Caminos (1983)
- Les Cantan a las Madres (1984) (Last album on Luna Music Corporation, a Sony division) (Last album with Asunción Rubalcava)
- La Fortuna de un Hijo (1984)
- Solo Exitos (1985) (First Garmex Records Sony Music Distribution album) (First album with Alejandro "Wico" López from returning to the band)
- 15 Super Corridos (1985)
- Claveles de Enero (1986)
- El Ranchero Chido (1988)
- Para Ti (1989)
- Los Grandes Corridos (1989)
- El Gato Negro (1990)
- Como Les Quedo (1991)
- Con Nuevos Horizontes (1992)
- Cumbias (1993)
- Una Explosion Musical (1994) (Last album on Garmex Records)
- Jugada Norteña (1995) (First album on Fonovisa)
- El Gato de Chihuahua (1995)
- Corridos Pesados (1995)
- Verdades Norteña (1996)
- Top Norteño (1997)
- Ofrenda a Mi Madre (1997)
- Aires de Mi Norte (1998)
- Corridos Pa' Pueblo (1998)
- Corridos con Fama Vol. 1 & 2 (1999)
- Norteño 2000 Vol. 1 & 2 (1999)
- En Que Trabaja el Muchacho (2000) U.S. #181
- 15 Kilates Musicales (2001)
- 30 Norteñas Perronas (2001)
- Borracho, Parrandero y Jugador (2001)
- En Vivo (2001) (Last album with Alejandro "Wico" López)
- Mensaje de Oro (2001) (First album with Antonio H. "El Guero" García and José Luis "El Chapete" Mejía)
- Pa'l Norte (2002) (Last album on Fonovisa)
- En El Tiempo (2003) (First album on Univision Records)
- 20 Corridos de Narco (2004)
- Con Experiencia y Juventud (2004)
- Corridos de Caballos (2004)
- Legado Norteño (2004)
- Tesoros de Coleccion (2004)
- Dejate Querer (2005)
- Momentos Inolvidables (2005)
- Contra Viento y Marea (2006)
- Grandes Corridos de Pelicula (2006)
- Nomás No Chillen (2006)
- Puro Pa' Arriba (2006) (First album with Roberto Heraclio "Rocky Jr." García)
- Vientos Huracanados (2007) (Last album on Univision Records)
- Siempre con Su Gente (2008)
- Mi Complemento (2009) (First album on Disa)
- En Vivo desde Monterrey (2010)
- Puras con Sax (2010)
- Corridos que Dejan Huella (2011)
- Soy Mexicano(2011) (Last album on Disa)
- 40 Aniversario (2012) (First album on Universal Music Latino)
- Como un Huracán (2012) (First album on Vene Music)
- Desde Toluca (En Vivo) (2016)
- Haciendo Historia (2016)
- Por Ser Mexicano (2017)
- Alma Bohemia (2018)
- # (Hashtag) (2018)
- Mixes con Categoría (2020)
- Corridos desde El Rancho (2020)
- Un Siglo Más (2021)
- Serenata En Vivo Pa'Las Toxicas(2021)
- Señora Bonita (2021)
- Mañanitas Virgen De Guadalupe (2021)
- Corridos Perros Vol.2 (2022)
- 50th Aniversario (2022)
- El Emigrante (2022)
- Por Eso La Deje (2023)
- Exageras De Bonita (2023)
- Con Mis Propias Manos (2023)
- Todo Contigo (2023)
- Le Doy (2024)
- Viaje Eterno (2024)
- Si No Me Querias (2024)
- Ayer Me Contaron (2024)
- Un Valiente De Villa (2024)
