= Raíces (Los Tigres del Norte album) =

Studio album by Los Tigres del Norte
- Released: May 4, 2008
- Recorded: 2007–2008
- Genre: Norteño
- Label: Fonovisa

Los Tigres del Norte chronology
Detalles y Emociones (2007)	Raíces (2008)	La Granja (2009)

Professional ratings
Review scores
Source	Rating
Allmusic	3.5/5 stars

Raíces ("Roots") is a cover album released by Regional Mexican band Los Tigres del Norte on May 4, 2008. The album became their sixth number-one set on the Billboard Top Latin Albums chart. It won the Grammy Award for Best Norteño Album at the Grammy Awards of 2009.

== Track listing ==
The information from Billboard.

No.	Title	Writer(s)	Length
1.	"El Rey"	José Alfredo Jiménez	2:23
2.	"Rumbo al Sur"	Felipe Valdés Leal, Ramón Ortega Contreras	3:30
3.	"El Hijo del Pueblo"	Jiménez	3:04
4.	"El Golpe Traidor"	Manuel Valdez	3:04
5.	"No Volveré"	Manuel Esperón, Ernesto Cortázar	3:21
6.	"Mi Gusto Es"	Samuel Lozano	3:39
7.	"Sangre Caliente"	Abelardo Pulido	3:43
8.	"Cien Años"	Rubén Fuentes, Alberto Cervantes	3:42
9.	"Tu Recuerdo y Yo"	Jiménez	3:06
10.	"Sin Ti"	Pepe Guízar	3:17
11.	"No Me Amenaces"	Jiménez	2:31
12.	"Tonta (Tonto)"	Armento Fierro	3:21

== Personnel ==
The information from Allmusic.

- Hernán Hernández – Production assistant, Voz, Bajo Eléctrico
- Jorge Hernández – Voz, Acordeón
- Eduardo Hernández – Voz, Acordeón, Bajo Sexto, Saxophone
- Luis Hernández – Voz, Bajo Sexto
- Oscar Lara – Batería
- Don C. Tyler – Mastering engineer
- Alfonso Ródenas – Engineer, mixing
- Joseph Pope – Engineer, mixing
- Adriana Rebold – Graphic design, art direction
- Pablo Castro – Art direction

== Chart performance ==
Chart (2008)	Peak position
Mexico AMPROFON Albums Chart	32
US Billboard Top Latin Albums	1
US Billboard Regional Mexican Albums	1
US Billboard 200	68
