= Los Rieleros del Norte =

Mexican band

Los Rieleros del Norte ("The Railers of the North") are a Mexican three-time Grammy-nominated regional Mexican band from Ojinaga, Chihuahua, Mexico. They are based in El Paso, Texas, United States, and specialize in the norteño-sax genre.

== History ==
They formed the band in Ojinaga, Chihuahua, in 1980 and later moved to Texas. The band's name, "Los Rieleros", is based on work that some members did on the railroads of Pecos, Texas. All original members of the band are natives of Ojinaga, Chihuahua, a town from which several other norteño-sax bands originated.

Currently, the band's lead vocalist is Daniel Esquivel; the other members include Daniel's sons Daniel Esquivel Jr. and José Luis Esquivel playing the button accordion and bajo sexto, respectively; Daniel's older brother Alfredo Esquivel playing drums; Alfredo's son José Ángel Esquivel playing electric bass; and Daniel and Alfredo's younger brother Javier Esquivel playing the alto saxophone. Original and longtime saxophonist Eugenio "Pemo" González left in 2024 to start his own band, Pemo González y su Vía Norteña, and was officially replaced by Javier Esquivel as Los Rieleros del Norte's official saxophonist. From 1985 through 1994, Polo Urías was the band's lead singer and bassist, but he left to form his own band, Polo Urías y su Maquina Norteña. Several years ago, the Rieleros ensemble had two bajo sexto players, one of whom was Manolo Morales – who eventually left to form his own band, Los Rieles. Los Rieleros del Norte also helped spin off La Maquinaria Norteña, which featured three former members of the Polo Urías band. They also inspired Esquivel's singer/songwriter and producer cousin, Isaac Esquivel, to join Sonic Ranch Studios, along with Christopher Schoemann and Christopher M. Carzoli.

Los Rieleros del Norte have recorded many albums over the years. These include; Estampida Norteña, Prieta Orgullosa, Aventura Pasada, and many other albums which have now become classics in regional Mexican music. Among their many songs, "El Columpio", "Te Quiero Mucho", "Amor Prohibido", "No le Digas a Nadie", "En la Puerta de Esa Casa", "Una Aventura" and, "Copa Sin Vino" are just some of their many singles, which have topped the regional Mexican music charts. Sobre los Rieles was released in September 2004, featuring the hit "Tu Nuevo Cariñito". In July 2005, Que el Mundo Ruede was released as the Rieleros' newest album. In 2006, Siempre Imitado Jamas Igualado was released, featuring the song "Voy a Llorar Por Ti", and on June 26, 2007, their album, Ven y Dime: 25 años was released, featuring the single "Un Juego". On May 27, 2008.

The actual founder of the band and its name is subject to controversy. Many fans had assumed that it was bassist Manalo Morales, but that probably is not true. Current leader Daniel Esquivel and Manolo Morales himself reportedly denied this in a morning radio show called "Piolín por la Mañana," acknowledging that Manuel "Meño" Lujan of Pecos is the original founder who named the group.

Lujan has maintained a low profile on this issue, so far preferring not to assert any legal right to ownership of the band's name. Meanwhile, the others proceeded in court to establish control over the band. The group filed a suit in the Western District of Texas against Morales, Los Rieleros del Norte, Inc. v. Morales et al, on March 21, 2007, for trademark infringement, to clarify this issue. Kathleen Cardone, a federal judge in El Paso, Texas, then gave all rights to Daniel Esquivel. The court order made Esquivel the rightful owner of the group and prohibited Morales from having any type of connection with the band, though Morales is rumored to have used the name of the group occasionally anyway. Armed with the court order, Esquivel consolidated his control of the band. His position was strengthened in early 2009 when, after seven years of litigation, the Mexican courts also held that he was the band's rightful owner. The court order prohibited Morales from using the name Los Rieleros and prohibited him from performing any songs recorded by the group from 2002 onwards without permission. These decisions together gave Daniel Esquivel full ownership of the band in both the United States and Mexico. Esquivel later stated in a press conference that he was willing to work with Morales and his crew and even help them to record an album of their own material, as long as they used a different name for their group. So far, there is no indication that this ever happened. Morales died on August 25, 2025.

== Discography ==
- 1982 Leonel Garcia
- 1983 La Eche en un Carrito
- 1984 El Regalito
- 1985 Corazón Cerrado
- 1986 Copa Sin Vino
- 1987 Naci Cantando
- 1988 ...En Gira Internacional
- 1989 La Golosa
- 1990 Castillo de Ilusion
- 1991 A Toda Maquina
- 1991 Volando Alto
- 1992 Me Lo Contaron Ayer
- 1992 Pecado de Amor
- 1993 Vias Por Conocer
- 1994 Peor Que Nada
- 1994 De Bueno Lo Mejor
- 1994 Adelanté Camínate
- 1994 En La Calle Te Dejo
- 1995 Rifaré Mí Suerte
- 1996 Invencible
- 1997 El Maquinista
- 1997 Aventura Pasada
- 1998 La Moraleja
- 1999 De Corazon Norteño
- 2000 Prieta Orgullosa
- 2001 Entrega de Amor
- 2002 Cuesta Arriba
- 2003 Abriendo Caminos
- 2004 Sobre Los Rieles
- 2005 Y Que El Mundo Ruede
- 2006 Siempre Imitado, Jamas Igualado
- 2007 Ven y Dime
- 2008 Pos Que No: Claro Que Si
- 2008 Homenaje a Javier Solís
- 2009 Pese a Quien le Pese
- 2009 En Vivo Para Ti
- 2010 Ni El Diablo Te Va a Querer
- 2012 Ayer, Hoy y Siempre
- 2014 En Tus Manos
- 2015 Corridos y Canciones de Mi Tierra
- 2015 Las Clasicas de Ayer, Vol. 1
- 2016 Con Eso o Más
- 2019 Seguimos Firme
- 2020 Ayer y Hoy con... Los Rieleros del Norte
- 2020 15 Rielazos Parranderos
- 2021 Frente a Frente: Conjunto Primavera - Los Rieleros del Norte
- 2021 Reafirmando El Estilo
- 2022 Las Retro Chingonas
- 2023 Hay Niveles
- 2023 The Best of Los Rieleros del Norte
- 2023 Lo Mejor de Dos Grandes

== See also ==
- Polo Urías
- Conjunto Primavera
