= Michael Salgado =

American singer

Salgado playing the accordion

Michael Salgado (born Miguel Salgado in April 5, 1971) is a Norteño/Tejano music singer/accordionist.

== Biography ==
Salgado was born in Big Spring, Texas, although his family roots are in Barrancos, Chihuahua, Mexico.

Salgado gained prominence in the mid-1990s by looking back to the 'norteño' sound influenced by Ramon Ayala, and by subsequently introducing the style to the younger generation. He positioned his backing musicians, brother Ernie and Uncle Jamie, to play guitar and drums respectively, with the bass player being his compadre, Joe Tanguma — at the age of only 19. He began climbing the Latin American music charts in 1995 after releasing his single "Cruz de Madera". Salgado's 1996 album "En Concierto" introduced his most successful single, "Sin Ella", which reached the top 20 of the Latin American music charts. His album "Mi Primer Amor" was released in 1997.

== Discography ==
Albums in order from newest to oldest:

=== Vino Especial ===
1. A Grito Abireto
2. Undido en la Tristeza
3. Llego Borracho el Borracho
4. El Tuerto
5. Vino Especial
6. Sufriendo Penas
7. Yaquecita
8. Puro Cuento
9. Que te vaya Bonito
10. Luis Pulido
11. Que tristeza yo Traigo
12. Corazon Seco
13. El Viboron
14. Esta Soledad
15. Me Despido

=== Volver Volver ===
1. No Quiero Seguir Sufriendo
2. Que Bonito
3. Ahora Que Tengo Dinero
4. La Yegua Ajena
5. Volver Volver
6. Hay Unos Ojos
7. Tu Tienes La Culpa
8. Me Toco Perder
9. Cuenta Aparte
10. Dile
11. Mal Pasado De Amor
12. Hasta El Fin
13. Quedo Triste Y Abandonado
14. Leyenda Macabra
15. Tristes Corazones
16. Me Cambio Por El Dinero
17. Aunque Estes Tan Lejos

=== El Zurdo De Oro ===
1. Te Quiero Te Extraño
2. Dueña De Mi Corazon
3. Prison De Botellas
4. El Panadero
5. Me Agarro Contigo
6. Sirveme Otra Cantinero
7. Rosalva De Leon
8. Perdoname
9. Morena De Mi Vida
10. Pobre Desdichado
11. Tu Retrato
12. Entre Botellas De Vino
13. Por Tu Culpa
14. Corrido
15. Me Ha Robado El Corazon
16. Harto

=== Entre Copas ===
1. La Cruz De Vidrio
2. La Condena
3. Esta Noche Me Encuentro Borracho
4. El Indio
5. Maldita Suerte
6. El Bilongo
7. Mi Cielo Gris
8. Mi Ultimo Trago
9. Llore Llore
10. Voy A Navegar
11. Lleno De Recuerdos
12. Prefiero Morir
13. Copa Tras Copa
14. La Ultima Botella
15. La Novedad

=== Tu Musica...Sin Fronteras ===
1. Tu Recuerdo
2. Mi Ultima Parranda
3. Dime Si El
4. No Me Llores
5. Maldiciendo Tu Destino
6. Que Te Bendiga Dios
7. Enséñame Olvidarte
8. Dicen
9. Porque No Vienes Ya
10. Por Ella
11. No Te Puedo Olvidar
12. Linda Muñeca
13. Lágrimas De Mi Barrio

=== Sangre de Rey ===
1. Sangre de Rey
2. Agárrame Compadre
3. Quiero Ver
4. Porque Eres Mujer
5. Pormesas Falsas
6. Cuando Te Fuiste
7. Comelona
8. Mi Tenampa
9. Pase Internacional
10. Que Pensaran De Mi
11. Para Que Presumes
12. Tu Partida

=== Mejores Tiempos ===
1. Sufriendo El Castigo
2. Ya No Voy Aguantar
3. No Puedo Olvidarla
4. No Me Amenaces
5. Macario Leyva
6. Ojitos
7. Compréndeme
8. Desde Que Tu Te Fuiste
9. Su Nombre En La Cruz
10. No Puedo Mas
11. Se Me Olvidó Otra Vez

=== Otra Vez A La Cantina ===
1. Cruz Grabada
2. Otra Vez A La Cantina
3. A Mover El Bote
4. Como Haces Falta
5. Nomas El Pilar Quedo
6. El Chonte
7. Amor Prohibido
8. Que Traigan Botellas
9. El Hijo De Sue
10. Tu Mereces Ser Feliz
11. Paloma Querida
12. Luz Elia La De Chihuahua

=== Puro Pueblo ===
1. Ya Volaré Volaré
2. Te Fuiste
3. Yo Quiero Saber
4. Mi Chatita
5. Dos Cruzes
6. Un Cancionero Lloró
7. Amor
8. Corazón
9. Corazón Ya No Llores
10. Será Que Tú
11. Disfrasando
12. Cantinero

=== Homenaje A Cornelio Reyna ===
1. Golondrina a Cornelio Reyna
2. Callejón Sin Salida
3. Ya No Llores
4. Por El Amor A Mi Madre
5. Te Vas Angel Mio
6. El Embrujado
7. Me Caiste Del Cielo
8. Mi Tesoro
9. Sufro Por Ti
10. Ni Por Mil Puñados De Oro
11. El Disgusto
12. Que Bonita Chaparrita

=== De Buenas Raices ===
1. La Media Vuelta
2. Junto A Mí
3. Palomita Blanca
4. Nuestro Gran Amor
5. Me Estas Partiendo El Alma
6. Que No Recuerdas
7. Llorar Llorar
8. El Besito
9. Un Poquitito De Amor
10. Lamento Hispano

=== En Concierto... ===
1. Si Quisieras
2. Cruz De Madera
3. Sin Ella
4. Amigo
5. El Dia En Que Te Fuiste
6. Recordando A Los Relampagos
7. Mi Lindo Padre
8. Muñeco
9. Si Tu Te Vas
10. El Gallo Desplumado

=== Cruz De Madera ===
1. El Día Que Te Fuiste
2. Cruz De Madera
3. Muñeco
4. Esta Noche
5. Si Tú Te Vas
6. No Me Hagas Menos
7. Feliz Con Otro
8. Usted No Me Conoce
9. El Gallo Desplumado
10. Mi Lindo Padre
