= Billboard regional Mexican charts =

The Billboard regional Mexican charts began in 1985 when an album chart were introduced as Regional Mexican Albums in the June 29 issue of the magazine. In October 1994, Billboard then established Regional Mexican Airplay, which ranks the most-played songs played on regional Mexican radio stations. As the music and radio industries, as well as the technology to monitor and measure sales and airplay, have evolved, Billboard currently publishes three different regional Mexican charts. On April 8, 2025, Billboard debuted the Hot Regional Mexican Songs chart, which ranks the best-performing regional Mexican songs across streaming, digital, and airplay from all radio stations in the United States.

Regional Mexican, according to Billboard, generally refers to music with "roots in traditional Mexican and Mexican American sounds" such mariachi, norteño, banda, Tejano and cumbia.

== History ==
=== Regional Mexican Albums ===
The Regional Mexican Albums chart was established on the issue dated June 29, 1985. Initially, it was published on a fortnightly basis with its positions being compiled by sales data from Latin retailers and distributors. The methodology for the chart was amended with the effect from the week of July 10, 1993, to have its sales compiled by Nielsen SoundScan, basing it on electronic point of sale data. At the same time, the chart began to be published weekly and became a sub chart of Top Latin Albums (which was established in the same week as the methodology change). Billboard also imposed a linguistic rule requiring an album to have 70% of its content in Spanish (later reduced to 50%) to be eligible to rank on the chart. On January 26, 2017, Billboard updated the Regional Mexican Albums, along with the other genre album charts, to incorporate track equivalent albums (TEA) and streaming equivalent albums (SEA) to match the current Billboard 200 methodology.

The first number-one album on the Regional Mexican Albums chart was Jaula de Oro by Los Tigres del Norte.

=== Regional Mexican Airplay ===
The Regional Mexican Airplay was established on October 8, 1994, as a subchart of the Latin Airplay chart. It ranks the top-performing songs played on Regional Mexican radio stations in the US based on weekly airplay data compiled by Nielsen's Broadcast Data Systems (BDS). It is the only subchart of Latin Airplay that continues to be spin-based rather than measure audience impressions.

The first number-one song on the Regional Mexican Airplay chart was "La Niña Fresa" by Banda Zeta.

=== Hot Regional Mexican Songs ===
On the issue dated April 12, 2025, Billboard established Hot Regional Mexican Songs which ranks the best-performing regional Mexican songs which follows the methodology of the Billboard Hot 100 by incorporating digital download sales, streaming data, and radio airplay of regional Mexican songs over all formats. The first number-one song on the Hot Regional Mexican Songs chart was "Me Jalo" by Fuerza Regida and Grupo Frontera.
