= Los Tigres del Norte =

California-based norteño Mexican band

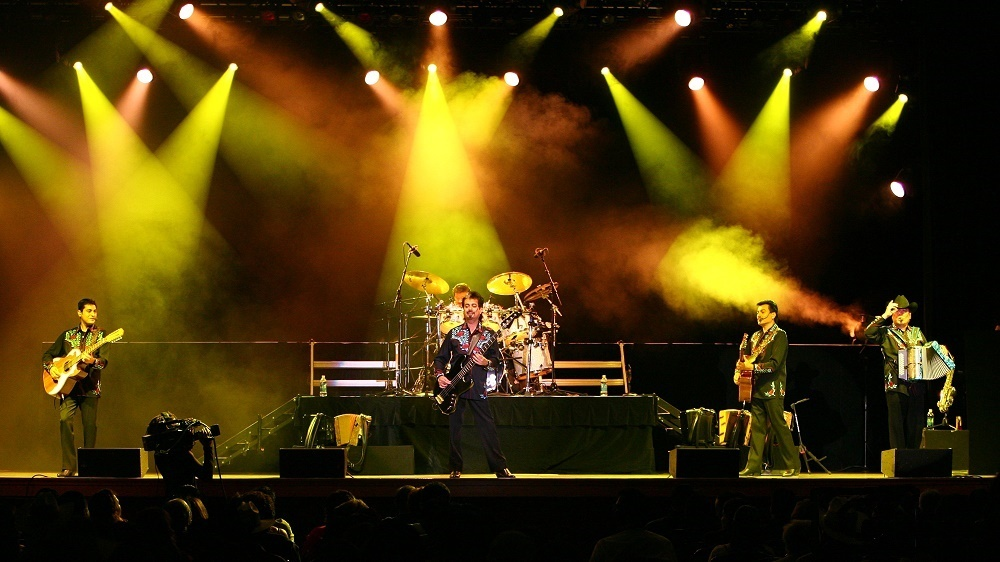
- Los Tigres del Norte at the Chumash Casino Resort in Santa Ynez, California.

Background information
- Origin: Mocorito, Sinaloa
- Genres: Pacific Norteño, Norteño with Sax
- Years active: 1965–present
- Labels: Discos Fama; Golondrina; EMI POPS; MGM Music; Profono Internacional; Poster; Melody; Musivisa; FonoVisa; Universal; Gamma; Gran Vía Musical De Ediciones; Discos DLB
- Members: Jorge Hernández; 1968–present Hernán Hernández 1968–present Eduardo Hernández 1988–present Luis Hernández 1996–present Óscar Lara; 1968–present
- Past members: Freddy Hernández (Deceased); Raúl Hernández 1968–1995; Guadalupe Olivo 1968–1988, 1997–2001
- Website: www.lostigresdelnorte.com

Los Tigres del Norte (English: The Tigers of the North) are a Mexican norteño band based in San Jose, California. Originally founded in the small town Rosa Morada in the municipality of Mocorito, Sinaloa, and with sales of 32 million albums, the band is one of the most recognized and prominent acts of regional Mexican music, due to their long history and successes. The band is known for their political and romantic corridos, some of which have faced censorship. The band is the only Mexican group to win 7 Grammy Awards and 13 Latin Grammys. In addition, the band has made 40 films alongside the Almada brothers (Mario and Fernando) among other well-known Mexican actors.

The band's style is based on regional music of Mexico, using mainly instruments such as the electric bass (or double bass), accordion, bass, drums and sometimes other percussion instruments. The lyrics in their songs fluctuate between romantic and political, including narcocorridos, in which they narrate the experience of members of drug gangs operating in Mexico. The narcocorrido song "Jefe de Jefes", for example, stands out, as it is dedicated to the legendary Mexican drug trafficker Miguel Ángel Félix Gallardo, "El Jefe de Jefes." In that song, the band tells the story of the power and influence of the now imprisoned Gallardo. Another of their famous narcocorridos, "The Queen of the South", is based on a novel by Arturo Pérez-Reverte from which a television series was made based on the Spanish writer's work. They have become famous in Mexico and the United States, especially in California and Texas. They also have found considerable fame in Colombia.

The band won a Grammy Award in 1988 for their album Gracias, América sin Fronteras, and twelve years later their album Herencia de Familia won the award for Best Norteño Album at the first ever Latin Grammys. A year later, in the second edition of the awards, they were nominated again for Best Norteño Album, this time for De Paisano a Paisano, and Best Regional Mexican Song for the song of the same title from that album. Their 2001 song "Somos Más Americanos" was ranked at No. 185 on the Rolling Stone list of "The 250 Greatest Songs of the 21st Century So Far".

== History ==
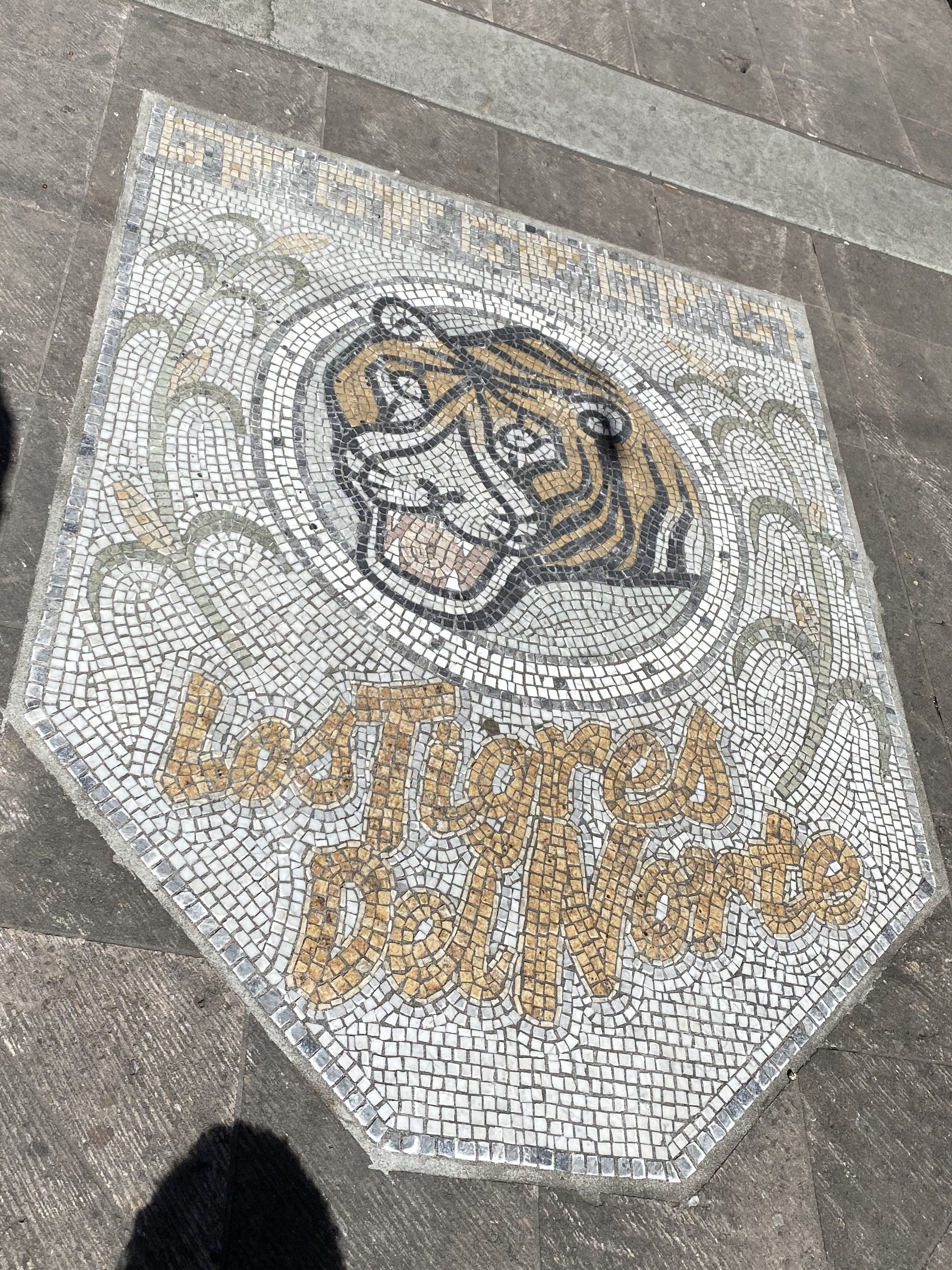
Tribute to Los Tigres del Norte at Mexican Heritage Plaza in San Jose, California.

The band was started by Rosa Morada, Mocorito, Sinaloa, Mexico natives Jorge Hernández, his brothers, and their cousins. They began recording after moving to San Jose, California in the late 1960s, when all the members were still in their teens. They were sponsored by a local record company, Discos Fama, owned by an Englishman named Arthur Walker, who took them under his wing and helped them find jobs and material, as well as recording all of their early albums.

Los Tigres del Norte were at first only locally popular, but took off after Jorge and Arthur Walker heard a Los Angeles mariachi singer perform a song in early 1971 about a couple of drug runners, Emilio Varela and Camelia la Texana. There had been occasional ballads (corridos, in Mexican terminology) about the cross-border drug trade ever since Prohibition in the 1920s, but never a song as cinematic as this, featuring a woman smuggler who shoots the man and takes off with the money. After getting permission to record this song, Los Tigres del Norte released "Contrabando y traición" ("Contraband and Betrayal") in 1974. The song quickly hit on both sides of the border, inspired a series of movies, and kicked off one of the most remarkable careers in Spanish-language music.

In norteño form, Los Tigres del Norte have been able to portray "real life" in a manner that strikes a chord with people across the Americas. Many of their most popular songs consist of tales or corridos about life, love, and the struggle to survive in an imperfect world. They regularly touch on the subject of narcotics and illegal immigration, but they have also shared stories of love and betrayal between a man and a woman. Together, the band and its public has turned norteño music into an international genre. The band has modernized the music, infusing it with bolero, cumbia, rock rhythms, and waltzes. They also prominently incorporate a saxophone into some of their songs. As a result, it can be said that they also perform norteño with sax in addition to traditional accordion-led norteño.

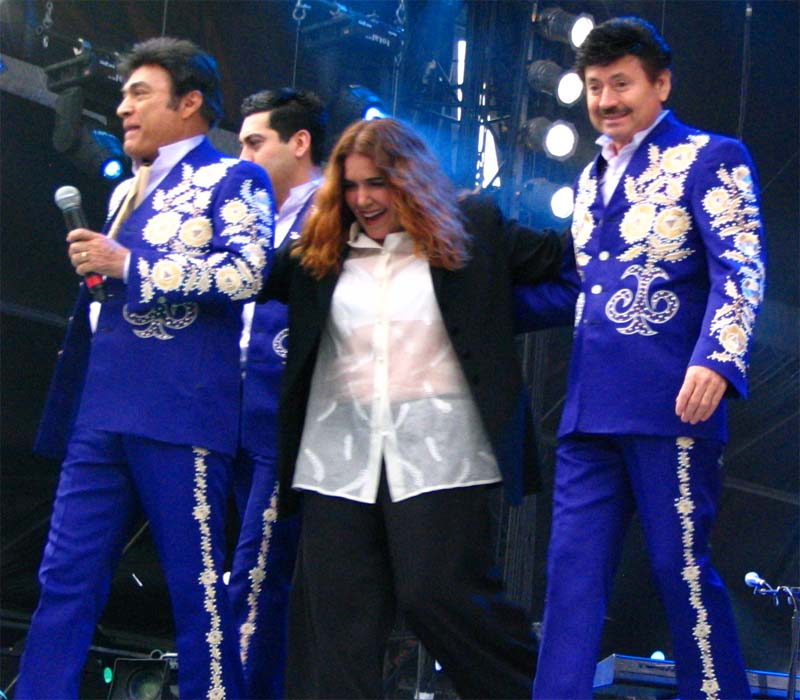
Tania Libertad with Los Tigres del Norte on May 17, 2007

On January 9, 2007, Los Tigres del Norte was honored as a BMI Icon at the 14th annual BMI Latin Awards. Los Tigres, who were saluted that evening with an all-star musical tribute, were being honored as BMI Icons for their "unique and indelible influence on generations of music makers." They joined an elite list that includes such Latin music giants as Juan Luis Guerra and Carlos Santana.

On October 16, 2009, Los Tigres del Norte held a Concert in Guadalupe, Nuevo León (outside of Monterrey) at the Annual Expo Guadalupe that lasted 12 hours, breaking their own record of 9 hours from previous year. It began on Saturday night and ended on Sunday at 9 a.m., not uncommon for Los Tigres del Norte. They are known for having encores at their concerts that can last more than an hour after the scheduled ending of the concert.

They have performed before the United States Armed Forces in Japan and South Korea.

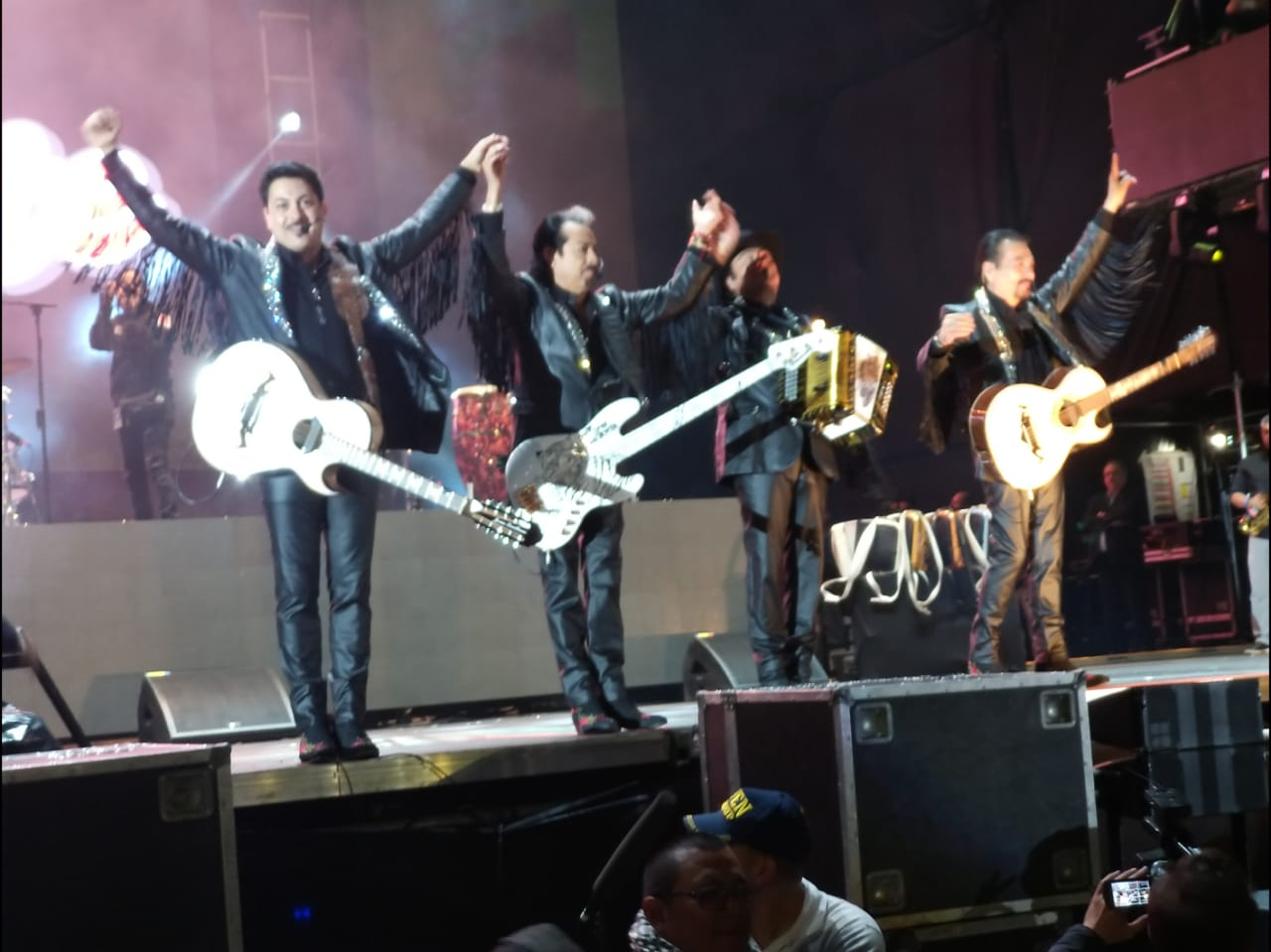
Tigres del Norte in Bogota 2019

In 2010, the band made headlines by joining in a massive international boycott of the U.S. state of Arizona, in response to the Support Our Law Enforcement and Safe Neighborhoods Act.

On October 8, 2013, Los Tigres del Norte played at an immigration reform rally on the National Mall in Washington, D.C. Their set list included songs that underscored the themes the rally would address including "La Puerta Negra" (1986), "De Paisano a Paisano" (2000), and "Mis Dos Patrias." The band was introduced by then Minority Leader Nancy Pelosi (D-Calif.). Mexican-American singer-songwriter and actress Lila Downs also accompanied the group in a series of duets.

In 2014 Los Tigres del Norte released the album Realidades, which contains the song "Era Diferente" (meaning "She Was Different") about a lesbian teenager who falls in love with her best friend; according to lead singer and songwriter Jorge Hernández, this is the first time a norteño group has ever written a gay love song.

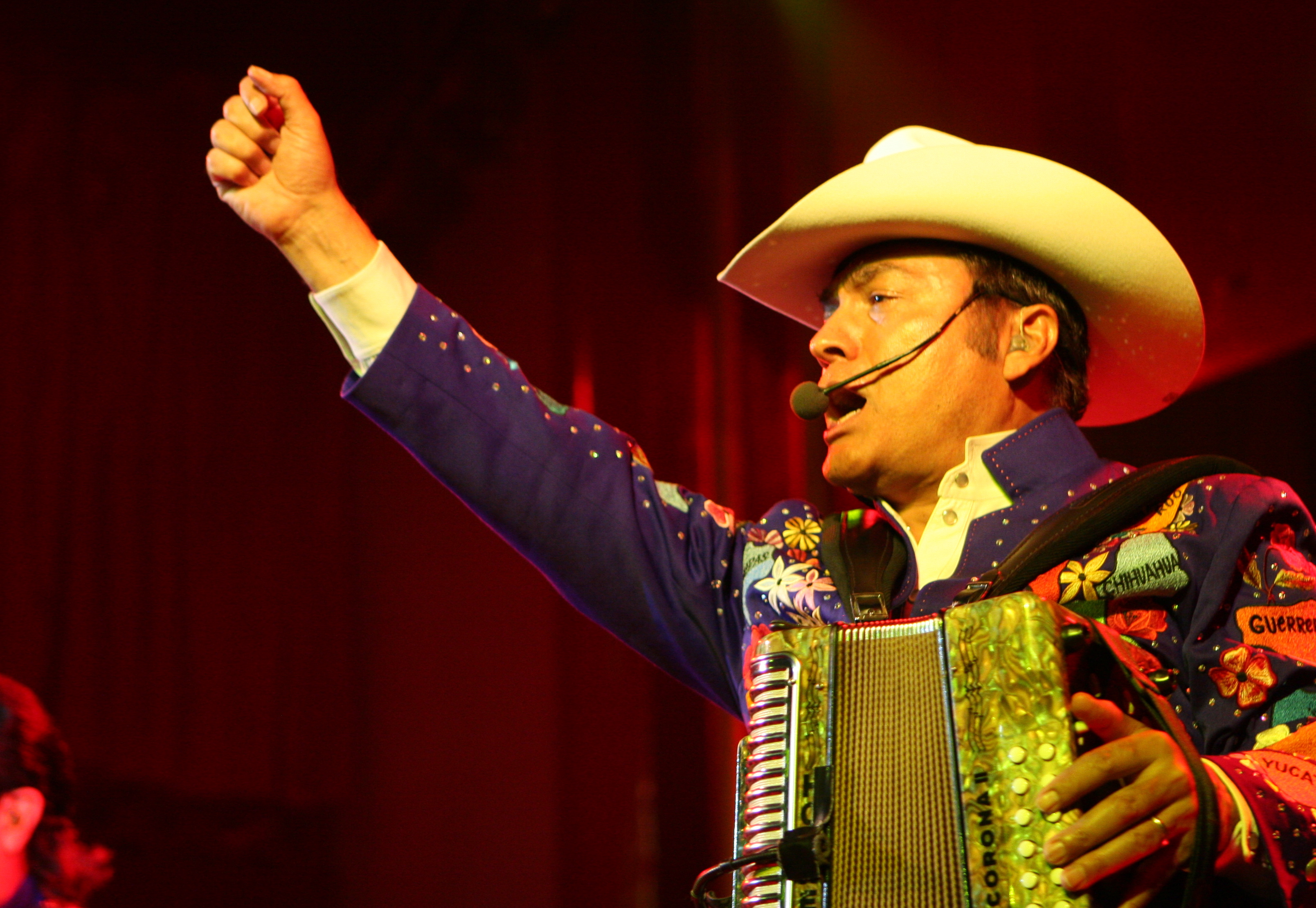
Jorge Hernández performing in August 2008

The band had sold 32 million records as of 2007. As of 2015, they had won 7 Grammy Awards, 6 Latin Grammy Awards, and a star on the Hollywood Walk of Fame. They received the Special Recognition (Spanish language) Award at the 26th annual GLAAD Media Awards in 2015, for their song "Era Diferente" ("She Was Different"). The band ranked number 15 in the list for "The 30 Most Influential Latin Artists of All Time" by Billboard magazine.

In 2018, many artists sought permission to record at Folsom Prison, more so for the 50th anniversary of Johnny Cash's recording there. However, Los Tigres del Norte was the only act authorized by the California Department of Corrections and Rehabilitation. In fact, Los Tigres are the only band to record an album at Folsom since Johnny Cash released his 1968 opus.

All group members are naturalized American citizens. In 2024, they appeared in alongside Vice President Kamala Harris at a campaign rally in Phoenix, Arizona.

== Philanthropy ==
In May 2000, Los Tigres del Norte founded the Los Tigres del Norte Foundation, which is committed to fostering appreciation and preservation of Mexican and Mexican-American folklore. The Los Tigres del Norte Foundation donated $500,000 to the UCLA Chicano Studies Research Center, which was used to digitize over 32,000 Spanish-language recordings contained in the Strachwitz Frontera Collection.

== Members ==
- Jorge Hernández – director, lead vocals, accordion
- Hernán Hernández – bass, vocals
- Eduardo Hernández – accordion, alto saxophone, bajo sexto, vocals
- Luis Hernández – bajo sexto, vocals
- Óscar Lara – drummer

== Former members ==
- Raúl Hernández – bajo sexto, vocals (left the group in 1996 to become a soloist)
- Lupe Olivo - saxophone, accordion (left the band in 1988 due to health problems, rejoined in 1996, and left again in 2001. He has since performed in Raúl Hernández' band)
- Freddy Hernández - percussion (died from a heart attack in a hotel room in 1993)

== Select discography ==
=== Albums ===
- 1968: Juana La Traicionera/Por El Amor A Mis Hijo
- 1971: Cuquita (remastered by Fonovisa in 2001)
- 1972: El Cheque (remastered by Fonovisa in 2001)
- 1974: Contrabando Y Traición (rerecorded at Profono in 1984)
- 1975: La Banda Del Carro Rojo (rerecorded at Profono in 1984)
- 1976: Pueblo Querido (rerecorded at Profono in 1984)
- 1977: Vivan Los Mojados (rerecorded at Profono in 1984)
- 1978: Numero Ocho (remastered by Fonovisa in 2001)
- 1979: El Tahúr (rerecorded at Profono in 1984)
- 1980: Plaza Garibaldi (remastered by Fonovisa in 2001)
- 1981: ...Un Día A La Vez! (rerecorded at Profono in 1984)
- 1982: Éxitos Para Siempre... (rerecorded at Profono in 1984)
- 1983: Carrera Contra La Muerte (last album under Fama label) (rerecorded at Profono in 1984)
- 1983: Internacionalmente Norteños/La Tumba Del Mojado (first album under Profono label [now Fonovisa])
- 1984: Jaula De Oro
- 1985: A Ti Madrecita (reissued in 2015 with 4 new songs)
- 1986: El otro México (reissued in 1994)
- 1987: Gracias!... América... Sin Fronteras (reissued in 1989)
- 1988: Ídolos Del Pueblo (last album with Lupe Olivo)
- 1989: Corridos Prohibidos (first album with Eduardo Hernández)
- 1989: Triunfo Sólido – Mi Buena Suerte
- 1990: Para Adoloridos
- 1991: Incansables!
- 1992: Con Sentimiento Y Sabor (Tan Bonita)
- 1992: Una Noche Con Los Tigres Del Norte
- 1993: La Garra De...
- 1994: Los Dos Plebes
- 1995: El Ejemplo (last album with Raúl Hernández before becoming soloist)
- 1996: Unidos Para Siempre (first album with Luis Hernández & Guadalupe Olivo returning to the group)
- 1997: Jefe De Jefes
- 1998: Así Como Tú
- 1999: Herencia De Familia
- 2000: De Paisano A Paisano (last album with Lupe Olivo)
- 2001: Uniendo Fronteras
- 2002: La Reina Del Sur
- 2004: Pacto De Sangre
- 2005: Directo Al Corazón
- 2006: Historias Que Contar
- 2007: Detalles Y Emociones
- 2008: Raíces
- 2008: Tu Noche con Los Tigres del Norte
- 2009: La Granja
- 2010: El Rugido De Los Tigres Del Norte
- 2011: MTV Unplugged: Los Tigres del Norte and Friends
- 2014: Realidades
- 2015: Desde El Azteca
- 2016: Ataud
- 2019: Los Tigres del Norte At Folsom Prison
- 2020: Y Su Palabra Es La Ley: Homenaje a Vicente Fernández
- 2022: La Reunión Deluxe

=== EPs ===
- 1984: Los Tigres Del Norte
- 2021: La Reunión
- 2024: Aquí Mando Yo

=== Singles ===
==== Los Tigres del Norte ====
- "Por Amor A Mis Hijos"
- "De Un Rancho A Otro"
- "El Cheque"
- "El Ausente"
- "Mi Gran Cariño"
- "Sufro Porque Te Quiero"
- "Polka Texas"
- "Las Tres Mujeres"
- "Los Sufrimientos"
- "Rio Magdalena"
- "Ya Cambiara Mi Destino"
- "La Loba Del Mal"
- "Rap Norteño" (single-only release)"
- "Hermosa Luna"
- "Mi Caballo Ensillado"
- "El Sordo Mudo" (side 2 track)
- "La Cochicuina"
- "Morena De San Francisco"
- "El Que Tanto Te Amo"
- "Quien Te Viera"
- "Adolfo Mi Compadre" (1984)
- "La Puerta Negra/Poppurri Mexicano" (1986)
- "Rap Norteño" (single-only release)"
- "Un Cuento De Navidad"
- "La Mesa del Rincon/La Navidad De Los Pobres" (1995)
- "Duro"
- "Mujeriego" (feat. Don Francisco)
- "Por Amor"
- "Aguas Revueltas"
- "El Enfermito"
- "La Bala" (2014)
- "Tu Carcel" (feat. Marco Antonio Solis)
- "Ataud" (2016)
- "Cuando Seas Grande" (feat. Alejandro Sanz, Gloria Trevi, and J Balvin)
- "Para Sacarte De Mi Vida" (feat. Alejandro Fernandez)
- "La Lotería"

==== Guest appearances ====
- Hermanitas Rodarte – "Dile Pajarillo"
- Hermanitas Rodarte – "Me Voy De Estas Tierras"
- Lupita Alatorre – "No Es Culpa Mia"
- The Simpsons – "El Corrido de Pedro y Homero", in the episode "¡The Fall Guy-Yi-Yi!"

== Filmography ==
Through their career, Los Tigres del Norte have appeared in numerous Mexican films, many of which are based on some of their hit songs. In genre, they range from action to drama. Many of the actors in these films include Mario and Fernando Almada, Eric Del Castillo, Pedro Infante, Jr., Jorge Reynoso, Lucha Villa, Cecilia Camacho, and Bernabe Melendez "El Gatillero".

In December 2016, media reports stated that Amateur Films would be producing Jefes De Jefes, a feature-length documentary about Los Tigres del Norte's history and cultural influence; no release date was announced.

- 1976: La Banda Del Carro Rojo
- 1976: La Muerte Del Soplon
- 1986: La Puerta Negra
- 1987: La Jaula De Oro
- 1989: Tres Veces Mojado
- 1990: Ni Parientes Somos
- 1991: La Camioneta Gris
- 1992: Los Tres Gallos
- 1993: Amor a la medida
- 2008: La misma luna
- 2019: Los Tigres del Norte at Folsom Prison

== Awards and nominations ==
=== Grammy Awards ===
Year	Work	Category	Result
1987	El Otro México	Best Mexican/Mexican-American Album	Nominated
1988	Gracias!...América...Sin Fronteras	Best Mexican/Mexican-American Album	Won
1989	Ídolos Del Pueblo	Best Mexican/Mexican-American Album	Nominated
1990	Corridos Prohibidos	Best Mexican/Mexican-American Album	Nominated
1992	Para Adoloridos	Best Mexican/Mexican-American Album	Nominated
1993	Con Sentimiento Y Sabor (Tan Bonita)	Best Mexican/Mexican-American Album	Nominated
1994	La Garra De...	Best Mexican/Mexican-American Album	Nominated
1998	Jefe De Jefes	Best Mexican/Mexican-American Album	Nominated
2004	La Reina Del Sur	Best Mexican/Mexican-American Album	Nominated
2007	Historias Que Contar	Best Norteño Album	Won
2008	Raíces	Best Norteño Album	Won
2009	Detalles Y Emociones	Best Norteño Album	Won
2010	Tu Noche con los Tigres Del Norte	Best Norteño Album	Won
2012	MTV Unplugged: Los Tigres Del Norte And Friends	Best Banda or Norteño Album	Won
2016	Realidades (Deluxe Edition)	Best Regional Mexican Music Album (including Tejano)	Won

== See also ==
- List of best-selling Latin music artists
