= List of number-one Billboard Top Latin Albums of 2004 =

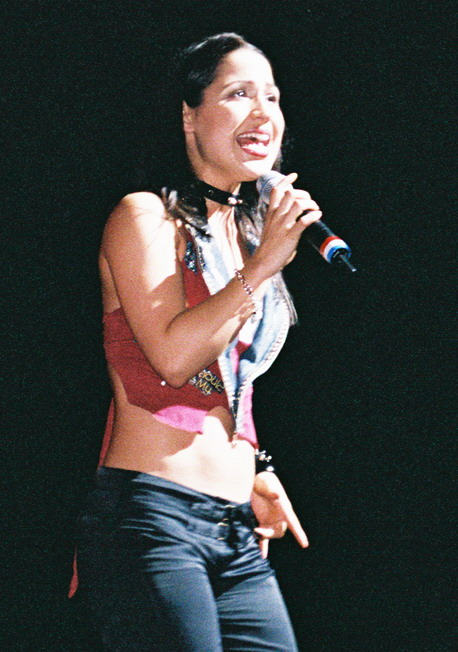
Jennifer Peña peaked at number one for the first time in 2004.

The Billboard Top Latin albums chart, published in Billboard magazine, is a record chart that features Latin music sales information. These data are compiled by Nielsen SoundScan from a sample that includes music stores, music departments at electronics and department stores, Internet sales (both physical and digital) and verifiable sales from concert venues in the United States.

There were twenty-two number-one albums in 2004, including two releases by the Mexican group Los Temerarios: Tributo al Amor and Veintisiete; the latter album received a nomination for a Grammy Award for Best Mexican/Mexican-American Album. However, the award went to Intimamente by Intocable, which also peaked at number one on the chart in March. Mi Sangre, by Colombian performer Juanes, was nominated for a Grammy Award for Best Latin Rock/Alternative Album, won three Latin Grammy Awards, and also reached the top spot of this chart for five consecutive weeks from October 16 to November 13, 2004.

Singer-songwriter Marco Antonio Solís also peaked twice at the top of the chart with his greatest hits album La Historia Continúa... and his Latin Grammy Award nominated album Razón de Sobra. Daddy Yankee, Jennifer Peña, Grupo Climax and Adán Sánchez peaked at number one for the first time in 2004. Luis Miguel's México En La Piel became his sixth number-one set on the chart and was also the winner of a Latin Grammy Award for Best Ranchero Album and the Grammy Award for Best Mexican/Mexican-American Album in 2005.

Two albums by Marc Anthony reached the top spot of the chart: Amar Sin Mentiras and Valió La Pena. With these recordings, Marc Anthony won the Grammy Award for Best Latin Pop Album and was nominated for a Latin Grammy Award for Best Male Pop Vocal Album for Amar Sin Mentiras. Valió La Pena was awarded with the Latin Grammy Award for Best Salsa Album and also received a Grammy Award nomination for Best Salsa/Merengue album.

== Albums ==
Issue Date	Album	Artist	Reference
January 3	Tributo al Amor	Los Temerarios	
January 10	La Historia Continúa...	Marco Antonio Solís	
January 17	La Historia Continúa...	Marco Antonio Solís	
January 24	Tributo al Amor	Los Temerarios	
January 31	La Historia	A.B. Quintanilla and Kumbia Kings	
February 7	La Historia Continúa...	Marco Antonio Solís	
February 14	Tributo al Amor	Los Temerarios	
February 21	Crónica de Dos Grandes	Los Bukis and Bronco	
February 28	Pau-Latina	Paulina Rubio	
March 6	Pau-Latina	Paulina Rubio	
March 13	Intimamente	Intocable	
March 20	Intimamente	Intocable	
March 27	Travesía	Víctor Manuelle	
April 3	Pau-Latina	Paulina Rubio	
April 10	En Vivo Desde Chicago	Grupo Montéz de Durango	
April 17	Pacto de Sangre	Los Tigres del Norte	
April 24	Pacto de Sangre	Los Tigres del Norte	
May 1	Pacto de Sangre	Los Tigres del Norte	
May 8	Amor y Lágrimas	Adán Sánchez	
May 15	Amor y Lágrimas	Adán Sánchez	
May 22	Amor y Lágrimas	Adán Sánchez	
May 29	Dejando Huella	Conjunto Primavera	
June 5	Seducción	Jennifer Peña	
June 12	Con Mis Propias Manos	Lupillo Rivera	
June 19	Con Mis Propias Manos	Lupillo Rivera	
June 26	Amar Sin Mentiras	Marc Anthony	
July 3	Amar Sin Mentiras	Marc Anthony	
July 10	Amar Sin Mentiras	Marc Anthony	
July 17	Veintisiete	Los Temerarios	
July 24	Veintisiete	Los Temerarios	
July 31	Barrio Fino	Daddy Yankee	
August 7	Veintisiete	Los Temerarios	
August 14	Valió La Pena	Marc Anthony	
August 21	Sin Riendas	Bronco	
August 28	Sin Riendas	Bronco	
September 4	Za Za Za	Grupo Climax	
September 11	Za Za Za	Grupo Climax	
September 18	Za Za Za	Grupo Climax	
September 25	Za Za Za	Grupo Climax	
October 2	Za Za Za	Grupo Climax	
October 9	Za Za Za	Grupo Climax	
October 16	Mi Sangre	Juanes	
October 23	Mi Sangre	Juanes	
October 30	Mi Sangre	Juanes	
November 6	Mi Sangre	Juanes	
November 13	Mi Sangre	Juanes	
November 20	Razón de Sobra	Marco Antonio Solís	
November 27	México En La Piel	Luis Miguel	
December 4	México En La Piel	Luis Miguel	
December 11	México En La Piel	Luis Miguel	
December 18	México En La Piel	Luis Miguel	
December 25	México En La Piel	Luis Miguel	
