= List of Billboard Regional Mexican Albums number ones of 2004 =

The Regional Mexican Albums, published in Billboard magazine, is a record chart that features Latin music sales information for regional styles of Mexican music. This data are compiled by Nielsen SoundScan from a sample that includes music stores, music departments at department stores and verifiable sales from concert venues in the United States.

== Albums ==
Issue date	Album	Artist(s)	Reference(s)
January 3	Tributo al Amor	Los Temerarios	
January 10	Tributo al Amor	Los Temerarios	
January 17	Tributo al Amor	Los Temerarios	
January 24	Tributo al Amor	Los Temerarios	
January 31	Tributo al Amor	Los Temerarios	
February 7	Tributo al Amor	Los Temerarios	
February 14	Tributo al Amor	Los Temerarios	
February 21	Cronica De Dos Grandes	Grupo Bronco/Los Bukis	
February 28	Cronica De Dos Grandes	Grupo Bronco/Los Bukis	
March 6	Cronica De Dos Grandes	Grupo Bronco/Los Bukis	
March 13	Intimamente: En Vivo Live	Intocable	
March 20	Intimamente: En Vivo Live	Intocable	
March 27	Intimamente: En Vivo Live	Intocable	
April 3	Intimamente: En Vivo Live	Intocable	
April 10	En Vivo Desde Chicago	Grupo Montez de Durango	
April 17	Pacto De Sangre	Los Tigres del Norte	
April 24	Pacto De Sangre	Los Tigres del Norte	
May 1	Pacto De Sangre	Los Tigres del Norte	
May 8	Amor y Lágrimas	Adán Chalino Sanchez	
May 15	Amor y Lágrimas	Adán Chalino Sanchez	
May 22	Amor y Lágrimas	Adán Chalino Sanchez	
May 29	Dejando Huella	Conjunto Primavera	
June 5	Dejando Huella	Conjunto Primavera	
June 12	Con Mis Propias Manos	Lupillo Rivera	
June 19	Con Mis Propias Manos	Lupillo Rivera	
June 26	Agarron Duranguense	Various Artists	
July 3	KOMP 104.9 Radio Compa	Akwid	
July 10	KOMP 104.9 Radio Compa	Akwid	
July 17	Veintisiete	Los Temerarios	
July 24	Veintisiete	Los Temerarios	
July 31	Veintisiete	Los Temerarios	
August 7	Veintisiete	Los Temerarios	
August 14	Dos Grandes	Marco Antonio Solis & Joan Sebastian	
August 21	Sin Rienda	Bronco: El Gigante De America	
August 28	Sin Rienda	Bronco: El Gigante De America	
September 4	Za Za Za	Grupo Climax	
September 11	Za Za Za	Grupo Climax	
September 18	Za Za Za	Grupo Climax	
September 25	Za Za Za	Grupo Climax	
October 2	Za Za Za	Grupo Climax	
October 9	Za Za Za	Grupo Climax	
October 16	Za Za Za	Grupo Climax	
October 23	Za Za Za	Grupo Climax	
October 30	Za Za Za	Grupo Climax	
November 6	Za Za Za	Grupo Climax	
November 13	Regalo De Amor	Los Temerarios	
November 20	Regalo De Amor	Los Temerarios	
November 27	México en la Piel	Luis Miguel	
December 4	México en la Piel	Luis Miguel	
December 11	México en la Piel	Luis Miguel	
December 18	México en la Piel	Luis Miguel	
December 25	México en la Piel	Luis Miguel	
