= List of number-one Billboard Top Latin Albums of 2003 =

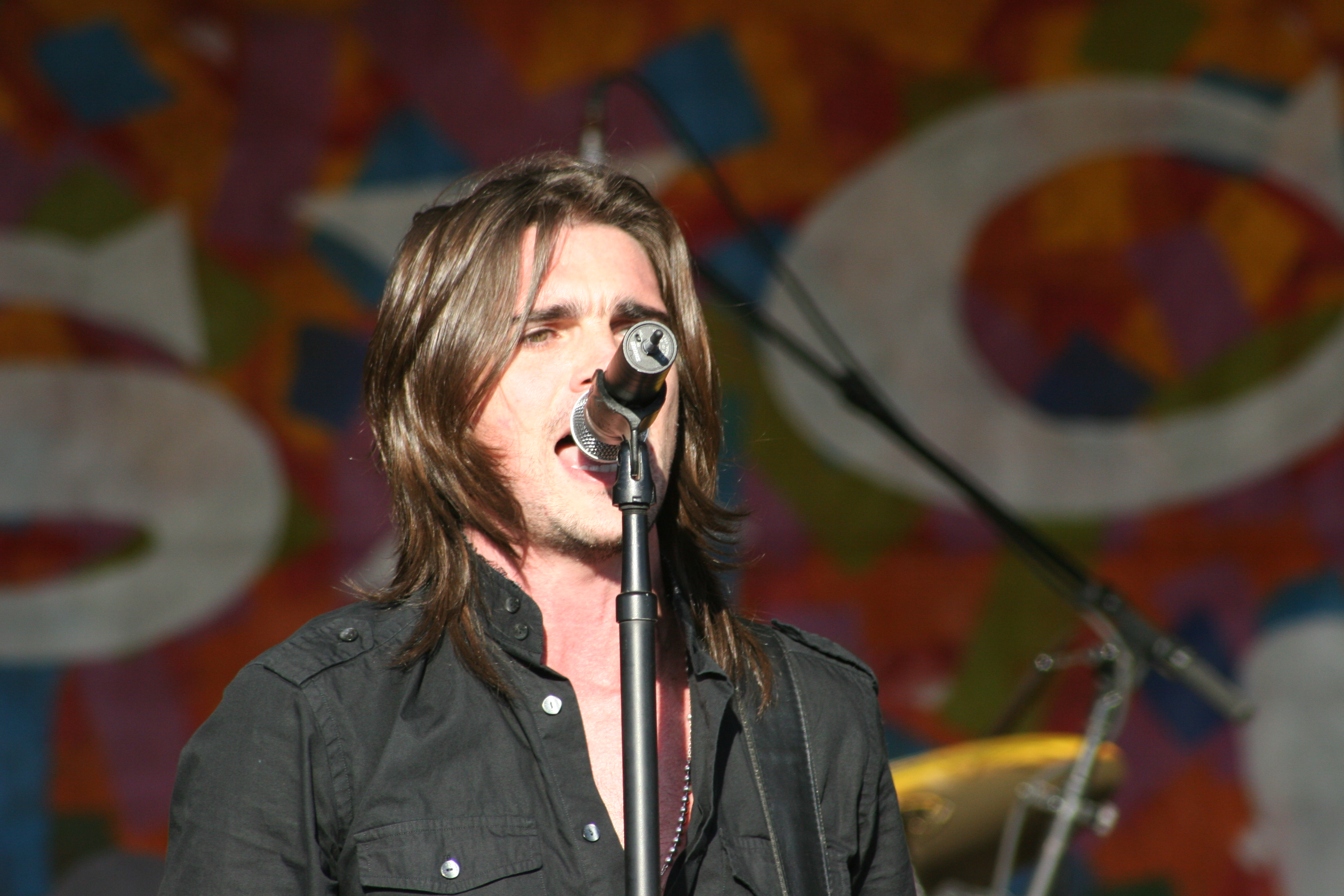
Juanes peaked at number one for the first time in 2003.

The Billboard Top Latin albums chart, published in Billboard magazine, is a record chart that features Latin music sales information. These data are compiled by Nielsen SoundScan from a sample that includes music stores, music departments at electronics and department stores, Internet sales (both physical and digital) and verifiable sales from concert venues in the United States.

There were twenty number-one albums in 2003, including Hijas del Tomate, the debut album by Spanish trio Las Ketchup; and Mambo Sinuendo, a collaboration between Ry Cooder and Manuel Galban, which won the Grammy Award for Best Pop Instrumental Album later in the year. Mexican singer-songwriter Marco Antonio Solís became the first performer to peak at number one 4 times in the same calendar year: twice as the lead member of Los Bukis and twice as a solo artist with La Historia Continúa... and Tu Amor o Tu Desprecio. Ranchero performer Pepe Aguilar debuted at number two on the chart on April 12, 2003, with Y Tenerte Otra Vez and the following week climbed to number one.

Un Día Normal, by Colombian performer Juanes, reached the top spot of the chart on its 68th week, 17 days after it won the Latin Grammy Award for Album of the Year. Mexican singer Luis Miguel released his 16th studio album, 33, which became his fifth number-one set, while fellow Mexican norteño music band Los Tigres del Norte peaked at the top of this chart for the fourth time (out of 13 releases) with Herencia Musical: 20 Corridos Inolvidables. Ricky Martin's Almas del Silencio debuted within the Top 40 in twelve countries, received a Latin Grammy nomination and also debuted at number one on the 'Billboard Top Latin Albums chart.

Puerto Rican performer Ednita Nazario peaked at number one for the first time with her 20th album, Por Ti. Bronco's Siempre Arriba also spent one week at the top, replacing fellow Mexican performers Los Tigres del Norte on August 9, 2003. A.B. Quintanilla with Kumbia Kings, Intocable and Los Temerarios were the only performers to hit the top spot twice in 2003. Cuban salsa performer Celia Cruz, who died on July 16, 2003, debuted at number one on the chart and won the Grammy Award for Best Salsa/Merengue Album with her last recording Regalo del Alma.

== Albums ==
Issue date	Album	Artist	Reference
January 4	Hijas del Tomate (Tomate's Daughters)	Las Ketchup	
January 11	Hijas del Tomate (Tomate's Daughters)	Las Ketchup	
January 18	Hijas del Tomate (Tomate's Daughters)	Las Ketchup	
January 25	Hijas del Tomate (Tomate's Daughters)	Las Ketchup	
February 1	30 Inolvidables (30 Unforgettables)	Los Bukis	
February 8	30 Inolvidables (30 Unforgettables)	Los Bukis	
February 15	Mambo Sinuendo (Mambo)	Manuel Galban and Ry Cooder	
February 22	Mambo Sinuendo (Mambo)	Manuel Galban and Ry Cooder	
March 1	La Historia (History)	Intocable	
March 8	La Historia (History)	Intocable	
March 15	4	A.B. Quintanilla presents Kumbia Kings	
March 22	4	A.B. Quintanilla presents Kumbia Kings	
March 29	4	A.B. Quintanilla presents Kumbia Kings	
April 5	4	A.B. Quintanilla presents Kumbia Kings	
April 12	La Historia	Intocable	
April 19	Y Tenerte Otra Vez (To Have You Once Again)	Pepe Aguilar	
April 26	20 Inolvidables (20 Unforgettable Songs)	Los Bukis and Los Temerarios	
May 3	20 Inolvidables (20 Unforgettable Songs)	Los Bukis and Los Temerarios	
May 10	20 Inolvidables (20 Unforgettable Songs)	Los Bukis and Los Temerarios	
May 17	20 Inolvidables (20 Unforgettable Songs)	Los Bukis and Los Temerarios	
May 24	20 Inolvidables (20 Unforgettable Songs)	Los Bukis and Los Temerarios	
May 31	Tu Amor o Tu Desprecio (Your Love or Your Disdain)	Marco Antonio Solís	
June 7	Almas del Silencio (Souls From Silence)	Ricky Martin	
June 14	Almas del Silencio (Souls From Silence)	Ricky Martin	
June 21	Almas del Silencio (Souls From Silence)	Ricky Martin	
June 28	Almas del Silencio (Souls From Silence)	Ricky Martin	
July 5	Almas del Silencio (Souls From Silence)	Ricky Martin	
July 12	Almas del Silencio (Souls From Silence)	Ricky Martin	
July 19	Herencia Musical: 20 Corridos Inolvidables (20 Unforgettable Corridos)	Los Tigres del Norte	
July 26	Herencia Musical: 20 Corridos Inolvidables (20 Unforgettable Corridos)	Los Tigres del Norte	
August 2	Herencia Musical: 20 Corridos Inolvidables (20 Unforgettable Corridos)	Los Tigres del Norte	
August 9	Siempre Arriba (Always on Top)	Bronco	
August 16	Regalo del Alma (A Gift from the Soul)	Celia Cruz	
August 23	Regalo del Alma (A Gift from the Soul)	Celia Cruz	
August 30	Regalo del Alma (A Gift from the Soul)	Celia Cruz	
September 6	Nuestro Destino Estaba Escrito (Our Destiny Was Already Written)	Intocable	
September 13	Sincero (Sincere)	Chayanne	
September 20	Un Día Normal (A Normal Day)	Juanes	
September 27	Un Día Normal (A Normal Day)	Juanes	
October 4	Un Día Normal (A Normal Day)	Juanes	
October 11	Un Día Normal (A Normal Day)	Juanes	
October 18	33	Luis Miguel	
October 25	33	Luis Miguel	
November 1	33	Luis Miguel	
November 8	La Historia (History)	A.B. Quintanilla and Kumbia Kings	
November 15	La Historia (History)	A.B. Quintanilla and Kumbia Kings	
November 22	La Historia Continúa... (The History Continues...)	Marco Antonio Solís	
November 29	La Historia Continúa... (The History Continues...)	Marco Antonio Solís	
December 6	Por Ti (For You)	Ednita Nazario	
December 13	Tributo al Amor (Tribute to Love)	Los Temerarios	
December 20	Tributo al Amor (Tribute to Love)	Los Temerarios	
December 27	Tributo al Amor (Tribute to Love)	Los Temerarios	
