= List of Billboard Regional Mexican Albums number ones of 2003 =

The Regional Mexican Albums, published in Billboard magazine, is a record chart that features Latin music sales information for regional styles of Mexican music. This data are compiled by Nielsen SoundScan from a sample that includes music stores, music departments at department stores and verifiable sales from concert venues in the United States.

== Albums ==
| Issue Date | Album | Artist | Reference |
|---|---|---|---|
| January 4 | La Reina Del Sur | Los Tigres del Norte | |
| January 11 | Cómplices Al Rescate: Mariana | Soundtrack | |
| January 18 | 30 Inolvidables | Los Bukis | |
| January 25 | 30 Inolvidables | Los Bukis | |
| February 1 | 30 Inolvidables | Los Bukis | |
| February 8 | 30 Inolvidables | Los Bukis | |
| February 15 | 30 Inolvidables | Los Bukis | |
| February 22 | 30 Inolvidables | Los Bukis | |
| March 1 | La Historia | Intocable | |
| March 8 | La Historia | Intocable | |
| March 15 | La Historia | Intocable | |
| March 22 | La Historia | Intocable | |
| March 29 | La Historia | Intocable | |
| April 5 | La Historia | Intocable | |
| April 12 | La Historia | Intocable | |
| April 19 | Y Tenerte Otra Vez | Pepe Aguilar | |
| April 26 | 20 Inolvidables | Los Bukis and Los Temerarios | |
| May 3 | 20 Inolvidables | Los Bukis and Los Temerarios | |
| May 10 | 20 Inolvidables | Los Bukis and Los Temerarios | |
| May 17 | 20 Inolvidables | Los Bukis and Los Temerarios | |
| May 24 | 20 Inolvidables | Los Bukis and Los Temerarios | |
| May 31 | 20 Inolvidables | Los Bukis and Los Temerarios | |
| June 7 | Tu Amor o Tu Desprecio | Marco Antonio Solís | |
| June 14 | Tu Amor o Tu Desprecio | Marco Antonio Solís | |
| June 21 | Tu Amor o Tu Desprecio | Marco Antonio Solís | |
| June 28 | Tu Amor o Tu Desprecio | Marco Antonio Solís | |
| July 5 | Tu Amor o Tu Desprecio | Marco Antonio Solís | |
| July 12 | Tu Amor o Tu Desprecio | Marco Antonio Solís | |
| July 19 | Herencia Musical: 20 Corridos Inolvidables | Los Tigres del Norte | |
| July 26 | Herencia Musical: 20 Corridos Inolvidables | Los Tigres del Norte | |
| August 2 | Herencia Musical: 20 Corridos Inolvidables | Los Tigres del Norte | |
| August 9 | Siempre Arriba | Bronco: El Gigante De America | |
| August 16 | Siempre Arriba | Bronco: El Gigante De America | |
| August 23 | 25 Joyas Musicales | Los Bukis | |
| August 30 | 25 Joyas Musicales | Los Bukis | |
| September 6 | Nuestro Destino Estaba Escrito | Intocable | |
| September 13 | Nuestro Destino Estaba Escrito | Intocable | |
| September 20 | Decide Tu | Conjunto Primavera | |
| September 27 | Decide Tu | Conjunto Primavera | |
| October 4 | Decide Tu | Conjunto Primavera | |
| October 11 | Decide Tu | Conjunto Primavera | |
| October 18 | De Durango A Chicago | Grupo Montez de Durango | |
| October 25 | De Durango A Chicago | Grupo Montez de Durango | |
| November 1 | De Durango A Chicago | Grupo Montez de Durango | |
| November 8 | De Durango A Chicago | Grupo Montez de Durango | |
| November 15 | De Durango A Chicago | Grupo Montez de Durango | |
| November 22 | De Durango A Chicago | Grupo Montez de Durango | |
| November 29 | En Vivo: Juntos Por Ultima Vez | Vicente Y Alejandro Fernandez | |
| December 6 | De Durango A Chicago † | Grupo Montez de Durango | |
| December 13 | Tributo al Amor | Los Temerarios | |
| December 20 | Tributo al Amor | Los Temerarios | |
| December 27 | Tributo al Amor | Los Temerarios | |
