= 2004 Premios Juventud =

1st Premios Juventud
- Date: September 23, 2004
- Location: Watsco Center in Miami, Florida
- Hosted by: Cristián de la Fuente, Galilea Montijo, Myrka Dellanos
- Website: Official Page

Television/radio coverage
- Network: Univision

The 1st Annual Premios Juventud (Youth Awards) were broadcast by Univision on September 23, 2004.

== Winners and nominees ==
Marc Anthony and Thalía was the leading nominees, with 13 nominations each. Jennifer Lopez follows with 12 nominations in various categories. Other artists receiving nominations include Luis Miguel with 11, Paulina Rubio and Ricky Martin with 9 each, and Colombian pop star Shakira with 6 nominations.

The night's biggest winners were Mexican superstar Thalía and Chayanne, with three statuettes. Other takers included Jennifer Lopez and popular Banda group Liberación, with two statuettes, baseball shortstop Alex Rodríguez, and pop singers Paulina Rubio and Juanes took home one award each.

=== Music ===
| La Pareja Más Pareja (Dynamic Duet) | ¡Qué Rico se Mueve! (Best Moves) |
|---|---|
| Juanes with Nelly Furtado: Alejandro Fernández with Vicente Fernández; Alicia Villarreal with Pedro Fernández; Ana Gabriel with Vikki Carr; Ana Torroja with Miguel Bosé; Chayanne with Vanessa Williams; Christina Aguilera with Ricky Martin; Conjunto Primavera with Graciela Beltrán; India with Marc Anthony; Maná with Santana; Marc Anthony with Jennifer Lopez; Marco Antonio Solís with Marisela; Rocío Dúrcal with Juan Gabriel; Thalía with Fat Joe; Thalía with Kumbia Kings | Chayanne: Ana Bárbara; Christina Aguilera; David Bisbal; Elvis Crespo; Jennifer Lopez; Jennifer Peña; Juan Gabriel; Kumbia Kings; Paulina Rubio; Pilar Montenegro; Ricky Martin; Shakira; Tego Calderón; Thalía |
| Voz del Momento (Voice of the Moment) | La Más Pegajosa (Catchiest Tune) |
| Paulina Rubio: Chayanne; Conjunto Primavera; Enrique Iglesias; Jennifer Lopez; Juan Gabriel; Los Temerarios; Luis Miguel; Maná; Marc Anthony; Marco Antonio Solís; Ricky Martin; Shakira; Thalía; Vicente Fernández | "El Za Za Za" - Liberación: "A Dios le pido" - Juanes; "¿A quién le importa?" - Thalía; "Ahora quién" - Marc Anthony; "Bulería" - David Bisbal; "Guasa, Guasa" - Tego Calderón; "Lágrimas de cristal" - Montéz de Durango; "Nadie es eterno" - Adán Chalino Sánchez; "No Me Ames" - Marc Anthony and Jennifer Lopez; "Pero que tal si te compro" - Lupillo Rivera; "Por debajo de la mesa" - Luis Miguel; "Que el ritmo no pare" - Patricia Manterola; "Que no quede huella" - Bronco; "Siempre en mi mente" - Juan Gabriel; "Te quiero ver bailar" - Lito & Polaco |
| Me Muero Sin Ese CD (CD To Die For) | La Más Retocada (Best Re-Mix) |
| De Viaje - Sin Bandera: "33" - Luis Miguel; "Almas del silencio" - Ricky Martin; "Amar Sin Mentiras" - Marc Anthony; "Amor y Lágrimas" - Adán Chalino Sánchez; "Cosas del amor" - Enrique Iglesias; "Fuera de serie" - Lito & Polaco; "Greatest Hits" - Thalía; "Love & Hate" - Aventura; "Paulina" - Paulina Rubio; "Romances" - Luis Miguel; "Sincero" - Chayanne; "Sueños Líquidos" - Maná; "Tu amor y tu desprecio" - Marco Antonio Solís; "Un día normal" - Juanes | "El Za Za Za" - Liberación/Clímax: "A puro dolor" - Son by Four; "Amor eterno" - Juan Gabriel / Rocío Dúrcal; "Aserejé" - Las Ketchup / La Onda / Chichicuilote; "Dos Locos" - Monchy y Alexandra / Aventura / Los Horóscopos de Durango; "Escándalo" - Rafael; "Feliz Navidad" - José Feliciano / Cheo Feliciano; "La vida es un carnaval" - Celia Cruz; "Livin' la Vida Loca" - Ricky Martin; "Lágrimas de cristal" - Grupo Montéz de Durango; "No Tengo Dinero" - Juan Gabriel / Kumbia Kings With Juan Gabriel and El Gran Silencio / Kumbia Kings with Limi-T 21; "Obsesión" - Aventura; "Quítame ese hombre" - Yolandita Monge and Pilar Montenegro; "Suavemente" - Elvis Crespo; "Y volver volver" - José Alfredo Jiménez and Vicente Fernández |
Canción Rompehielo (Party Starter)
"¿A quién le importa?" - Thalía: "Algo Tienes" - Paulina Rubio; "Bomba" - Azul Azul; "Dos locos" - Monchy y Alejandra; "El listón de tu pelo" - Angeles Azules; "El Za Za Za" - Liberación; "Guasa, Guasa" - Tego Calderón; "La Bomba" - Ricky Martin; "La Negra Tiene Tumbao" - Celia Cruz; "La Vida Es Un Carnaval" - Celia Cruz; "Macarena" - Los Del Río; "Rebotando" - Ilegales; "Sabes a Chocolate" - Kumbia Kings with Pee Wee González; "Suavemente" - Elvis Crespo; "Te quiero ver bailar" - Lito & Polaco

=== Fashion and Images ===
| Quiero Vestir Como Ella (She's Totally Red Carpet) | El de Mejor Estilo (He's Got Style) |
|---|---|
| Jennifer Lopez: Ana Gabriel; Gloria Estefan; Jacqueline Andere; Laura León; María Celeste Arrarás; Maribel Guardia; Myrka Dellanos; Olga Tañón; Paulina Rubio; Roselyn Sánchez; Salma Hayek; Shakira; Sofía Vergara; Thalía | Chayanne: Alejandro Fernández; Andrés García; Antonio Banderas; Enrique Iglesias; Jorge Ramos; Jorge Salinas; Juan Gabriel; Luis Miguel; Marc Anthony; Marco Antonio Solís; Pablo Montero; Ricky Martin; Saúl Lisazo; Vicente Fernández |
| Chica Que Me Quita el Sueño (Girl that takes the sleep away) | ¡Está Buenísimo! (What a Hottie!) |
| Thalía: Amelia Vega; Aracely Arámbula; Edith González; Jennifer Lopez; Kate del Castillo; Lucero; Myrka Dellanos; Olga Tañón; Patricia Manterola; Paulina Rubio; Roselyn Sánchez; Salma Hayek; Shakira; Sofía Vergara | Chayanne: Adán Sánchez; Alejandro Fernández; Andrés García; Antonio Banderas; Eduardo Verástegui; Eduardo Yáñez; Enrique Iglesias; Gabriel Soto; Jorge Salinas; Luis Miguel; Marc Anthony; Pablo Montero; Ricky Martin; Saúl Lisazo |

=== Movies ===
| ¡Qué Actorazo! (Can He Act or What?) | Actriz que se Roba la Pantalla (She Steals the Show) |
|---|---|
| Gael García Bernal: Alejandro Fernández; Andrés García; Antonio Banderas; Cantinflas; César Évora; Chayanne; Diego Luna; Eduardo Yáñez; Fernando Colunga; Jorge Salinas; Luis Miguel; Marc Anthony; Osvaldo Ríos; Vicente Fernández | Yadhira Carrillo: Edith González; Itatí Cantoral; Jennifer Lopez; Judy Marte; Kate del Castillo; Laura León; Lucero; Maribel Guardia; Penélope Cruz; Roselyn Sánchez; Salma Hayek; Sofía Vergara; Thalía; Verónica Castro |
Película Más Padre (Favorite Flick)
Shrek 2: Amores perros; Chasing Papi; Como agua para chocolate; El crimen del Padre Amaro; Desperado; Harry Potter; My Family; Once Upon a Time in Mexico; Raising Victor Vargas; Scarface; Selena; Un día sin mexicanos; Y tu mamá también; Zorro

=== Pop Culture ===
| Mi Idolo Es (My Idol Is) | Tórridos Romances (Hottest Romance) |
|---|---|
| Thalía: Celia Cruz; Chayanne; Cristina; Jennifer Lopez; Jorge Ramos; Luis Miguel; Marc Anthony; María Celeste Arrarás; Paulina Rubio; Salma Hayek; Selena; Shakira; Vicente Fernández; Vicente Fox | Luis Miguel and Myrka Dellanos: Ana Bárbara And Julio Sabala; Cristian Castro And Gabriela Bo; Eduardo Santamarina And Susana González; Raúl De Molina And Lili Estefan; Galilea Montijo And Cuauhtémoc Blanco; Jennifer Lopez And Ben Affleck; Jennifer Lopez And Marc Anthony; Kate del Castillo And Luis García; Ninel Conde And José Manuel Figueroa; Niurka Marcos And Bobby Larios; Niurka Marcos AndJuan Osorio; Paulina Rubio And José María Torre; Shakira And Antonio de la Rúa; Thalía And Tommy Mottola |
En la Mira de los Paparazzi (Paparazzi's Favorite Target)
Jennifer Lopez and Marc Anthony: Cristian Castro; Jennifer Lopez; Julio Iglesias; Lucero; Luis Miguel; Luis Miguel And Myrka Dellanos; Marc Anthony; Myrka Dellanos; Niurka Marcos; Niurka And Bobby; Osvaldo Ríos; Paulina Rubio; Ricky Martin; Thalía

=== Sports ===
| El Deportista de Alto Voltaje (Most Electrifying Guy Jock) | La Deportista de Alta Tensión (Most Electrifying Girl Jock) |
|---|---|
| Alex Rodríguez - Baseball: Cuauhtémoc Blanco - Football; Francisco Palencia - Football; Hugo Sánchez - Football; Jorge Campos - Football; José Cardozo - Football; Juan Pablo Montoya - Auto Racing; Julio César Chávez - Boxing; Maradona - Football; Miguel Cabrera - Baseball; Oscar De La Hoya - Boxing; Oswaldo Sánchez - Football; Rafael Márquez - Football; Ronaldo - Football; Sammy Sosa - Baseball | Ana Guevara: Fabiola Zuluaga - Tenis; Gabriela Sabatini - Tenis; Gabriela Pérez del Solar - Volleyball; Mia St. John - Boxing; Nancy López - Golf; Rebecca Lobo - Basketball; Soraya Jiménez - Weight Lifting; Wanda Rijo - Weight Lifting |
| Me Pongo la Camiseta de... (I'm a Die-Hard Fan of...) | Novato del Año (Rookie that Rocks) |
| New York Yankees: Houston Astros; Boston Red Sox; Chicago Bulls; Chicago Cubs; Cruz Azul; Los Angeles Dodgers; Los Angeles Lakers; Las Aguilas de América; Las Chivas de Guadalajara; Los Pumas; Miami Marlins; New York Mets; Oakland Raiders; Selección Mexicana | Julio César Chávez, Jr. - Boxing: Guillermo Ochoa - Football; José Contreras - Baseball; Miguel Cabrera - Baseball |
Encontronazos Clásicos (Most Explosive Rivals)
Las Aguilas del América Vs. Las Chivas Rayadas de Guadalajara: América Vs. Pumas; América Vs. Pumas; Argentina Vs. Brasil; Barcelona Vs. Real Madrid; Boca Jr. Vs. Riverplay; Boston Vs. Yankees; Chivas Vs. Cruz Azul; Chivas Vs. Pumas; LA Dodgers Vs. Anaheim Angels; Lakers Vs. 76ers; Lakers Vs. Pistons; Marlins Vs. Yankees; México Vs. USA; Yankees Vs. Mets

== Arrivals ==
- Akwid
- Aleks Syntek
- Alicia Villarreal
- Amelia Vega
- Ana Claudia Talancón
- Ana Torroja
- Aracely Arámbula
- Camila Sodi
- Carolina Tejera
- Cristián de la Fuente
- Eugenio Derbez
- Gael García Bernal
- Galilea Montijo
- Ivy Queen
- Jennifer Peña
- Jorge Campos
- José José
- José María Torre
- Juanes
- Julieta Venegas
- Kate del Castillo
- Kumbia Kings
- Laisha Wilkins
- Lili Estefan
- Myrka Dellanos
- Odalys García
- Paulina Rubio
- Pee Wee
- Rafael Amaya
- Rene Lavan
- Shalim
- Sofía Vergara
- Valentino Lanús

== Performances ==
- Ana Toroja — "Duele El Amor"
- Ivy Queen and Gran Omar — "Chika Ideal"
- Jennifer Peña — "Hasta El Fin Del Mundo"
- Juanes — "Nada Valgo Sin Tu Amor"
- Kumbia Kings — "Sabes A Chocolate"
- Paulina Rubio — "Dame Otro Tequila"
