= México en la piel =

México en la piel may refer to:

- "México en la piel" (song), a 1990 song by José Manuel Fernández Espinosa
- México en la Piel (album), a 2004 album by Luis Miguel
