= List of Billboard Regional Mexican Albums number ones of 1990 =

The Regional Mexican Albums, published in Billboard magazine, is a record chart that features Latin music sales information for regional styles of Mexican music. This data are compiled by Nielsen SoundScan from a sample that includes music stores, music departments at department stores and verifiable sales from concert venues in the United States.

== Albums ==
Issue date	Album	Artist	Reference
January 6	A Todo Galope	Bronco	
January 13	A Todo Galope	Bronco	
January 20	A Todo Galope	Bronco	
January 27	A Todo Galope	Bronco	
February 3	A Todo Galope	Bronco	
February 10	A Todo Galope	Bronco	
February 17	A Todo Galope	Bronco	
February 24	A Todo Galope	Bronco	
March 3	A Todo Galope	Bronco	
March 10	A Todo Galope	Bronco	
March 17	A Todo Galope	Bronco	
March 24	A Todo Galope	Bronco	
March 31	A Todo Galope	Bronco	
April 7	A Todo Galope	Bronco	
April 14	A Todo Galope	Bronco	
April 21	A Todo Galope	Bronco	
April 28	A Todo Galope	Bronco	
May 5	A Todo Galope	Bronco	
May 12	A Todo Galope	Bronco	
May 19	A Todo Galope	Bronco	
May 26	A Todo Galope	Bronco	
June 2	A Todo Galope	Bronco	
June 9	A Todo Galope	Bronco	
June 16	A Todo Galope	Bronco	
June 23	A Todo Galope	Bronco	
June 30	No Te Olvidaré	Mazz	
July 7	No Te Olvidaré	Mazz	
July 14	No Te Olvidaré	Mazz	
July 21	No Te Olvidaré	Mazz	
July 28	No Te Olvidaré	Mazz	
August 4	No Te Olvidaré	Mazz	
August 11	No Te Olvidaré	Mazz	
August 18	No Te Olvidaré	Mazz	
August 25	No Te Olvidaré	Mazz	
September 1	No Te Olvidaré	Mazz	
September 8	No Te Olvidaré	Mazz	
September 15	No Te Olvidaré	Mazz	
September 22	No Te Olvidaré	Mazz	
September 29	No Te Olvidaré	Mazz	
October 6	No Te Olvidaré	Mazz	
October 13	Lo Nuevo y Lo Mejor	Los Temerarios	
October 20	Lo Nuevo y Lo Mejor	Los Temerarios	
October 27	Lo Nuevo y Lo Mejor	Los Temerarios	
November 3	No Te Olvidaré	Mazz	
November 10	Amigo	Bronco	
November 17	Amigo	Bronco	
November 24	Amigo	Bronco	
December 1	Amigo	Bronco	
December 8	Amigo	Bronco	
December 15	Amigo	Bronco	
December 22	Amigo	Bronco	
December 29	Amigo	Bronco	
