= Ritmo Latino =

American retail music chain

- Company type: Music retailer
- Industry: Retail
- Founded: 1989 (as a music retail chain, defunct 2010)
- Founder: David Massry
- Headquarters: Los Angeles, California, USA
- Products: DVDs, CDs, videos, video games, posters, books, collectibles, and accessories.
- Website: Archived official website at the Wayback Machine (archive index)

Ritmo Latino was a Latin-oriented retail music chain. It currently exists as a T-Mobile franchise partner under the name Ritmo Latino Wireless. From 1989 until 2010, Ritmo operated its music retail stores across the United States, primarily in Hispanic areas. With 53 stores at its peak, Ritmo was the largest Latin music chain in the United States.

== History ==
In 1989, David Massry opened the first Ritmo Latino store in Santa Ana, California. He named it Ritmo Latino (Spanish for “Latin Rhythm”) in order to appeal to its Hispanic customer base.

Ritmo Latino has been noted by its ability to provide innovative services and experiences to its customers that were not typically provided by niche music stores at that time. Ritmo expanded its business model in 1992, by becoming an authorized Ticketmaster vendor to provide additional services to its customers in all of its stores, and in 1998, by introducing the first Spanish Book Department in its store in Santa Ana.

In 1999, the first Ritmo Rock opened in Los Angeles. Ritmo Rock is a store concept dedicated to Latin and English rock, something Massry called “a niche within a niche.”

In 2000, Ritmo Latino sponsored the first Premio de la Gente awards, which was created to award Latin music based on fans votes. The show was nationally televised with Uno Productions. Although Ritmo Latino no longer sponsors the show, it continues to air annually on Telemundo.

Ritmo Latino continued to innovate by incorporating interactive technology into its stores. In 2001, Ritmo began putting Video Arcade rooms in its stores. In 2003, Ritmo's store in Miami became the first Latin music store to implement interactive listening stations. The listening stations were such a success that the company adopted the technology into all of its stores. In 2005, Ritmo launched an educational computer software line specifically designed for the Spanish speaking market.

By 2007, Ritmo had 52 stores in the U.S., in states such as California, Nevada, Arizona, Texas, Illinois, Florida, Washington D.C., Maryland, and New Jersey. They opened 3 new stores inside El Gallo Giro Restaurants and launched the first Tus Perfumenes, a store within a store concept dedicated to selling a full line of perfumes, in Oakland. Ritmo also received notable media attention when it accused Jennifer Lopez of not supporting her Latin heritage because she would not make public appearances promoting her album Como Ama una Mujer at any Latin-oriented music chain. Ritmo further garnered attention by banning all of Lopez's CDs from its stores.

As the music retail industry declined, so did Ritmo Latino. In 2008, Ritmo Latino inaugurated their first transition to T-Mobile store in El Monte, CA, and opened 2 more stores by year's end. In 2009, Ritmo opened an additional 13 T-Mobile stores, including stores in the Northern California, Houston, and Washington D.C. markets, bring the total T-Mobile store count to 16.

The last Ritmo Latino music store closed in July 2010, and Ritmo Latino Inc was officially dissolved by the end of 2011.

== Handprint collection ==
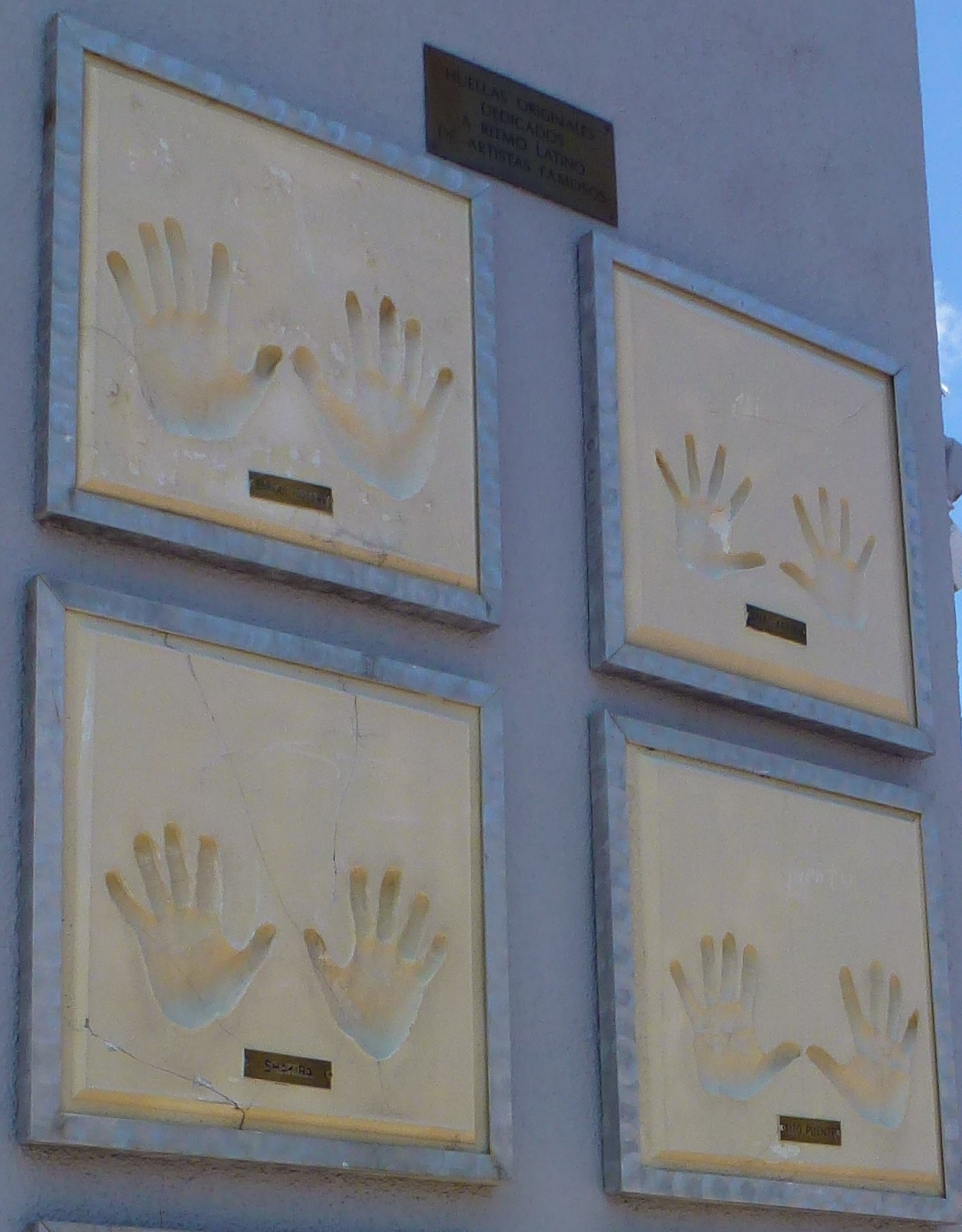
Ritmo Latino Handprints of Latin Music Greats, at the San Fernando Mall

Ritmo Latino was well known for owning the largest collection of Latin celebrity cement handprints in the US.

Celebrities in the collection:

1. Ricky Martin
2. Juan Gabriel
3. Shakira
4. Enrique Iglesias
5. Vicente Fernández
6. Marc Anthony
7. Marco Antonio Solís
8. Juanes
9. Celia Cruz
10. Fher (Maná)
11. Chayanne
12. Joan Sebastian
13. Ana Gabriel
14. Alex Gonzales (Maná)
15. Cristian
16. Alejandro Fernández
17. José José
18. Ricardo Arjona
19. Thalía
20. Alejandro Sanz
21. Julio Iglesias
22. Daddy Yankee
23. Gloria Trevi
24. Alejandro Sanz
25. Julio Iglesias
26. Daddy Yankee
27. Paulina Rubio
28. Alejandra Guzmán
29. Saúl Hernández
30. Álex Lora
31. Tito Puente
32. Elvis Crespo
33. Amanda Miguel
34. Pedro Fernández
35. Emmanuel
36. Yahir
37. Jerry Rivera
38. Raúl di Blasio
39. Rogelio Martínez
40. Nelson Ned
41. Álvaro Torres
42. Gilberto Santa Rosa
43. José María Napoleón
44. Ramiro Delgado (Bronco)
45. Javier Bronco (Bronco)
46. Choche Man (Bronco)
47. José Guadalupe Esparza (Bronco)
48. Juan Calleros (Maná)
49. Segio Vallin (Maná)
