= Y Ahora Te Vas =

Single by Los Bukis

from the album Si Me Recuerdas
- Released: 1988
- Recorded: 1987
- Genre: Grupero rhythmic ballad
- Length: 3:57
- Label: Fonovisa
- Songwriter: Marco Antonio Solís
- Producer: Marco Antonio Solís

Los Bukis singles chronology
"Qué Mala" (1988)	"Y Ahora Te Vas" (1988)	"Si Me Recuerdas" (1988)

"Y Ahora Te Vas" (English: And Now You Leave) is a song written and produced by Mexican singer and songwriter, Marco Antonio Solís. It was performed by him as the lead singer of Los Bukis. It was released as the second single from his 11th Grammy nominated studio album Si Me Recuerdas (1988). This song became their first #1 single on the Billboard Hot Latin Tracks chart.

"Y Ahora Te Vas" has also been included on several compilation albums released by Los Bukis including their two #1 albums 30 Inolvidables (2002) and Crónica de Dos Grandes (2004). This song also has been covered by a handful of performers including Conjunto Atardecer, Victor García, Grupo Santa Clara, Inicial de Durango, Los Komplices, Mar Azul, Tito Nieves, Banda R-15, Notable, La Nueva Luna, Estela Núñez, Orquesta Noche Sabrosa, Otro Sentido, Lefty Pérez, Raulin Rodríguez, Raulin Rosendo and Los 6 de Durango.

"Y Ahora Te Vas" debuted on the Billboard Hot Latin Tracks chart at #45 on February 20,1988 and climbed to the Top 10 five weeks later. It reached the top position of the chart on April 23,1988, replacing "Debo Hacerlo" by Mexican singer-songwriter, Juan Gabriel, and being replaced one week later by Ana Gabriel's "Ay Amor". "Y Ahora Te Vas" ranked at #12 on the Hot Latin Tracks Year-End Chart of 1988 and became the third Top 10 single for the group on the chart after "Éste Adiós" (1986) and "Tú Carcel" (1987).

Los Bukis won the Lo Nuestro Award in 1989 for Best Regional Mexican Song for this single, Best Regional Mexican Album (Si Me Recuerdas) and Best Regional Mexican Group. In 2013, Colombian singer, Jorge Celedón, and Solís recorded a new version of the song in vallenato for the former's album Celedon Sin Fronteras. This new version peaked at #6 on the Colombian National-Report charts.
