= A Todo Galope =

Studio album by Bronco
- Released: 1989
- Genres: Grupero, norteño
- Length: 38:30
- Label: Ariola Records
- Producer: Homero Hernández

Bronco chronology
Un Golpe Mas (1988)	A Todo Galope (1989)	Bronco Amigo (1990)

A Todo Galope (Eng.: "At Full Gallop") is a studio album released by Bronco with Ariola Records and Fonovisa Records in 1989. It is composed of 12 songs. Select tracks were written by José Guadalupe Esparza while others were written by songwriters such as Bebu Silvetti and Manuel Alejandro. Homero Hernández produced the album.

== Track listing ==
No.	Title	Writer(s)	Length
1.	"Corazón Bandido"	Jose Guadalupe Esparza	3:28
2.	"Pero a Mí No Me Engañas"	Guillermo Estrada	3:10
3.	"Una Rosa, Una Espina"	Roberto Livi, Bebu Silvetti	3:12
4.	"La Potranquita"	Esparza	2:46
5.	"No Quiero Volver"	Belester	2:46
6.	"Él o Yo"	Esparza	2:33
7.	"Que No Quede Huella"	Esparza	2:56
8.	"Amor Total"	Manuel Alejandro	2:50
9.	"Con Dinero"	Humberto Galindo	3:04
10.	"Mi Chica Difícil"	Esparza	2:58
11.	"Un Fin de Semana"	Demetrio Vite	3:19
12.	"Cuéntame, Cuéntame"	Esparza	2:50
Total length:			38:30

== Charts ==
Chart (1990)	Peak position
Billboard Regional Mexican Albums	1
