= Primera Fila (Bronco album) =

Live album by Bronco
- Released: March 24, 2017
- Recorded: Early 2017
- Studio: Estudios Churubusco
- Genre: Grupero, norteño, pop
- Length: 52:01
- Label: Sony Latin

Bronco/El Gigante de America chronology
Indestructible (2015)	Primera Fila (2017)	Por Mas (2019)

Singles from Primera Fila
- 1. "Nunca Voy a Olvidarte" Released: January 13, 2017

Primera Fila is the eighth live album by the regional Mexican music group Bronco, released on March 24, 2017, through Sony Music and their first album as Bronco since 1997, releasing it to the market very soon after Sony negotiated with Bronco's former manager, Óscar Flores, in order for Bronco to possess the legal right to perform under such name after 20 years.

It was recorded at Churubusco Studios in Mexico City. Members of Bronco performed as they typically would during a concert. Allo 19 of the songs part of the album were recorded in the studio. Three songs, "Doctor", "Gajes de Oficio", and "Impotente" had been previously unpublished compositions by José Luis Roma, lead singer of Río Roma, Miguel Luna, and Bronco frontman José Guadalupe Esparza. The album contains combinations of rhythms between Bronco's grupera and norteña-style music and the Latin pop, hip hop, mariachi, and ballads from featured artists.

It features Cristian Castro, the Argentine duo Illya Kuryaki and The Valderramas, Julieta Venegas, Leon Larregui, and the children's band LemonGrass. The track "Doctor" is performed by Esparzas's sons: René and José Adán Esparza.

== Track listing ==
No.	Title	Length
1.	"Nunca Voy a Olvidarte"	3:25
2.	"Sergio el Bailador/Coolo" (with Illya Kuryaki and the Valderramas)	3:56
3.	"Dos mujeres, Un Camino"	3:34
4.	"Si te Vuelves a Enamorar"	3:27
5.	"El Sheriff de Chocolate/Los Castigados" (with LemonGrass)	3:58
6.	"Con Zapatos de Tacón"	2:57
7.	"Libros Tontos"	3:36
8.	"Adoro" (with Julieta Venegas)	3:42
9.	"Que No Quede Huella"	3:03
10.	"Oro"	3:16
11.	"Que Te Han Visto Llorar"	3:13
12.	"Corazón Duro"	3:36
13.	"Pastillas de Amnesia"	3:09
14.	"Déjame Amarte Otra Vez"	3:44
15.	"Amigo Bronco"	3:52
16.	"Doctor"	3:37
17.	"Gajes de Oficio"	3:53
18.	"Impotente"	3:41
19.	"Quiéreme Como te Quiero"	3:22
Total length:		52:01

== Certifications ==
Region	Certification	Certified units/sales
Mexico (AMPROFON)	Platinum	60,000^{‡}
^{‡} Sales+streaming figures based on certification alone.
