= Fernando Angel =

Mexican musician (born 1963)

Fernando Angel (born 16 September 1963) is a Mexican musician who was a member of the ranchera group, Los Temerarios.

Fernando Angel is the cousin of Adolfo and Gustavo Angel, original band members. He joined the group in 1982, when the group was still known as Grupo Brisas. In 1983, the group changed its name to Los Temerarios. Fernando plays bass guitar.

Fernando Angel is perhaps the least known member of the Angel family in the group. This may be because usually Adolfo's and Gustavo's photographs headline the group's CDs and concert posters. Nevertheless, he has also become popular in Mexico and the rest of Latin America as a member of the famous group. He has also impressed many music critics with his ability to play the bass.

Fernando left the group in 2005, with his last performance in their hometown of Fresnillo, Zacatecas.
