= Camino del Amor =

Studio album by Los Temerarios
- Released: 16 October 1995
- Genre: Romantic music, Latin music
- Label: AFG Sigma Records 1995; Fonovisa 1996

Los Temerarios chronology
En Concierto, Vol. 1 (1994)	Camino del Amor (1995)	Edicion de Oro (1996)

Camino del Amor (The Road of Love) is a studio album released by Los Temerarios. This final album included all 5 original members, Mario Alberto Ortiz departs from the band in 1996. Karlo Vidal replaces Mario Alberto Ortiz as the new drummer in 1997.

== Track list ==
All songs were composed by Adolfo Angel Alba. But one song is composed by Gustavo Angel Alba.

1. "Como Tu" – 3:55
2. "Cuando Fuiste Mia" – 4:24
3. "La Mujer de Los Dos" – 5:00
4. "Sin Ti Moriria" (Gustavo Angel Alba) – 4:07
5. "Ahi Estare Yo" – 3:19
6. "Mi Alma Reclama" – 4:54
7. "Eres un Angel" – 4:39
8. "Todo Me Recuerda a Ti" – 3:36
9. "Pobre Tonto Enamorado" – 3:38
10. "Una Guitarra Llora" – 4:09

== Personnel ==
- Carlos Abrego – percussion
- Mario Alberto Ortiz – drums
- Manrique Moheno Aguilar – executive coordinator
- Mario Alanis – engineer
- Adolfo Ángel Alba – arranger, keyboards, vocals, mastering, mixing
- Gustavo Ángel Alba – guitar, vocals
- Javier Alfaro – violin
- Carlos Anadon – photography
- Javier Carrillo – violin
- Jaime Cavazos – engineer, mastering, mixing
- Alejandro Ceballos – violin
- Jose Antonio Farias – backing vocals
- Fernando Gonzalez – bass
- Manrique Moheno – executive coordinator
- Keko "Antroposofico" Mota – assistant engineer
- Enrique Ramos – violin
- Adriana Rebold – graphic design, art direction
- Jorge Ruiz – guitar, trumpet, violin, director
- Luis Vega – mastering, mixing
- Miguel Viurquis – trumpet

== Charts ==
Chart (1995)	Peak position
US Top Latin Albums (Billboard)	6
US Regional Mexican Albums (Billboard)	2

== Sales and certifications ==
Region	Certification	Certified units/sales
United States (RIAA)	6× Platinum (Latin)	360,000^{‡}
^{‡} Sales+streaming figures based on certification alone.
