= Si Tú Te Vas (album) =

Studio album by Los Temerarios
- Released: July 8, 2008
- Genre: Pop Latino
- Label: Fonovisa
- Producer: Rudy Perez, Adolfo Angel Alba

Los Temerarios chronology
Recuerdos del Alma (2007)	Si Tú Te Vas (2008)	Evolucion de Amor (2008)

Si Tú Te Vas (Eng.: If You Go) is the title of a studio album released by Mexican group Los Temerarios on July 8, 2008. This album became their eighth number-one set on the Billboard Top Latin Albums the most for any group. By the time this album was released all original members were gone, Fernando Angel, Karlo Vidal, and Jonathan Amabilis depart in 2005 leaving only Adolfo and Gustavo.

On March 31, 2009, Los Temerarios released Si Tú Te Vas (Deluxe Edition) with an extended version of Si Tú Te Vas, and a bonus DVD with some bonus tracks videos, and extras.

== Standard Edition ==
The information from Billboard.

No.	Title	Writer(s)	Length
1.	"Si Tú Te Vas"	Adolfo Angel Alba	3:23
2.	"Miedo"	Rudy Perez, Omar Sánchez	3:03
3.	"Confesión"	Pérez	3:23
4.	"Nadie Se Muere de Amor"	Pérez	3:52
5.	"Luz de Luna"	Pérez, Mark Portmann, Adrián Posse	3:51
6.	"Conocerte"	Pérez	4:12
7.	"Si Tú Te Vas Con El"	Pérez, Roberto Livi	4:10
8.	"Tú Eres Mi Amor"	Pérez, Alba	4:30
9.	"Loco por Tí"	Pérez	4:06
10.	"Basta Ya"	Pérez, Alba	5:23

Si Tu Te Vas (Deluxe Edition)

Studio album by Los Temerarios
- Released: March 31, 2009
- Genre: Pop Latino
- Length: 47:53
- Label: Fonovisa
- Producer: Rudy Perez, Adolfo Angel Alba

== Si Tú Te Vas (Deluxe Edition) Bonus DVD ==
The information from Lostemerarios.net (Official Website)

No.	Title	Writer(s)	Length
1.	"Si Tú Te Vas"	Adolfo Angel Alba	3:23
2.	"Miedo"	Rudy Perez, Omar Sánchez	3:03
3.	"Confesión"	Pérez	3:23
4.	"Nadie Se Muere de Amor"	Pérez	3:52
5.	"Luz de Luna"	Pérez, Marc Portman, Adrián Posse	3:51
6.	"Conocerte"	Pérez	4:12
7.	"Si Tú Te Vas Con El"	Pérez, Roberto Livi	4:10
8.	"Tú Eres Mi Amor"	Pérez, Alba	4:30
9.	"Loco por Tí"	Pérez	4:06
10.	"Basta Ya"	Pérez, Alba	5:23
11.	"Si Tú Te Vas (Extended Version)"	Adolfo Angel Alba	4:34

- BONUS DVD
- Si Tú Te Vas (VIDEO)
- Loco Por Ti (VIDEO)
- Extras (Si Tú Te Vas) Making Of
- Extras (Loco Por Ti) Making Of
- Special Interview (Extras)
- Photo Gallery

== Charts ==
=== Weekly charts ===
Chart (2008–2009)	Peak position
Méxican Albums (AMPROFON)	36
US Billboard 200	26
US Top Latin Albums (Billboard)	1
US Regional Mexican Albums (Billboard)	1

=== Year-end charts ===
Chart (2008)	Position
US Top Latin Albums (Billboard)	19
Chart (2009)	Position
US Top Latin Albums (Billboard)	56

== Sales and certifications ==
Region	Certification	Certified units/sales
United States (RIAA)	2× Platinum (Latin)	200,000^{^}
^{^} Shipments figures based on certification alone.
