= Travesía (album) =

Studio album by Víctor Manuelle
- Released: March 2, 2004
- Recorded: 2003–2004
- Studio: Crescent Moon Studios (Miami, Florida); Rolo Studio (San Juan, Puerto Rico)
- Genre: Salsa; Latin pop; Bolero
- Length: 50:56
- Label: Sony Discos
- Producer: Emilio Estefan, Jr.; Alberto Gaitán; Ricardo Gaitán

Víctor Manuelle chronology
Le Preguntaba a la Luna (2002)	Travesía (2004)	Víctor Manuelle En Vivo: Desde el Carnegie Hall (2005)

Singles from Travesía
- 1. "Lloré Lloré" Released: January 5, 2004; 2. "Te Propongo" Released: May 3, 2004; 3. "Tengo Ganas" Released: July 12, 2004

Professional ratings
Review scores
Source	Rating
AllMusic	3.5/5 stars
Los Angeles Times	5/5 stars

Travesía (English: Crossing) is a studio album recorded by Puerto Rican salsa performer Víctor Manuelle, It was released by Sony Music Latin on March 2, 2004 (see 2004 in music). This album became his second number-one set on the Billboard Top Latin Albums.

== Track listing ==
The track listing from Billboard.

No.	Title	Writer(s)	Length
1.	"Lloré Lloré"	Ricardo Gaitán · Alberto Gaitán · Víctor Manuelle	5:09
2.	"Tengo Ganas [Salsa]"	Emilio Estefan, Jr. · Víctor Manuelle	4:28
3.	"Pero Quién"	Víctor Manuelle	4:46
4.	"Te Propongo"	Pedro Jesús	4:46
5.	"Amarte Es [Salsa]"	Gian Marco	4:29
6.	"No Me Hace Falta"	Ricardo Gaitán · Alberto Gaitán · Archie Peña	3:50
7.	"Si Me Preguntan"	Víctor Manuelle	4:33
8.	"Tengo Ganas [Ballad]"	Emilio Estefan · Víctor Manuelle	4:19
9.	"Yo Te Daré"	Ricardo Gaitán · Alberto Gaitán · Carlos Vives · Emilio Estefan · Tom McWilliams · Víctor Manuelle · Tony Mardini	3:02
10.	"No Te Dije"	Ricardo Gaitán · Alberto Gaitán · Víctor Manuelle · Marco Linares	3:37
11.	"Contigo"	Ricardo Gaitán · Alberto Gaitán · Emilio Estefan · Bruno Linares	4:10
12.	"Amarte Es [Ballad]"	Gian Marco	3:51

== Chart performance ==
Chart performance for Travesía
Chart (2004)	Peak position
Dominican Albums (Musicalia)	9
US Billboard 200	177
US Top Latin Albums (Billboard)	1
US Tropical Albums (Billboard)	1

== Certifications ==
Certifications for Travesía
Region	Certification	Certified units/sales
United States (RIAA)	Platinum (Latin)	100,000^{^}
^{^} Shipments figures based on certification alone.

== See also ==
- List of number-one Billboard Top Latin Albums of 2004
- List of number-one Billboard Tropical Albums from the 2000s
