= Crónica de Dos Grandes =

Greatest hits album by Los Bukis and Bronco
- Released: February 3, 2004
- Genre: Romantic music, Grupera, Cumbia, Norteño
- Label: Fonovisa

Los Bukis chronology
20 Inolvidables (2003)	Crónica de Dos Grandes (2004)	Los Idolos de Siempre (2004)

Bronco chronology
Siempre Arriba (2003)	Crónica de Dos Grandes (2004)	Sin Riendas (2004)

Crónica de Dos Grandes (Eng.: Chronicle of Two Idols) is a compilation album released by the Mexican groups Los Bukis and Bronco. This album became the third number-one album for Los Bukis and the second for Bronco in the Billboard Top Latin Albums chart. A special edition was released in 2005 titled Crónica de Dos Grandes: Recuerdos con Amor.

== Track listing ==
This information from Billboard.com.

=== CD track listing ===
No.	Title	Writer(s)	Performer	Length
1.	"Estabas Tan Linda"	Marco Antonio Solís	Los Bukis	3:49
2.	"Adoro"	Armando Manzanero	Bronco	3:33
3.	"A Donde Vas"	Solís	Los Bukis	4:02
4.	"Muérdeme"	José Guadalupe Esparza	Bronco	2:52
5.	"Como Me Haces Falta"	Solís	Los Bukis	3:58
6.	"Cinco Locos"	Húmberto Galindo	Bronco	2:58
7.	"A Donde Vayas"	Solís	Los Bukis	3:29
8.	"Oro"	José María Frías, Miguel Alfonso Luna Ordaz	Bronco	3:13
9.	"Necesita de Tí"	Solís	Los Bukis	3:30
10.	"Nunca Voy a Olvidarte"	Roberto Belester	Bronco	2:21
11.	"Y Ahora Te Vas"	Solís	Los Bukis	3:55
12.	"Que No Quede Huella"	Esparza	Bronco	3:00
13.	"Triste Imaginar"	Solís	Los Bukis	3:03
14.	"Sed"	Gil Rivera	Bronco	3:23
15.	"Yo Te Necesito"	Solís	Los Bukis	3:00
16.	"Un Fin de Semana"	Demetrio Vite	Bronco	3:23
17.	"Necesito Una Compañera"	Solís	Los Bukis	3:54
18.	"Puente de Piedra"	Carmelo Larrea	Bronco	3:04
19.	"Presiento Que Voy a Llorar"	Solís	Los Bukis	3:29
20.	"Oficialmente Loco"	Rivera	Bronco	3:35

=== DVD track listing ===
This information from Allmusic.

No.	Title	Performer	Length
1.	"Tu Carcel"	Los Bukis
2.	"Que No Quede Huella"	Bronco
3.	"Mi Mayor Necesidad"	Los Bukis
4.	"Adoro"	Bronco
5.	"Quiéreme"	Los Bukis
6.	"El Sherif de Chocolate"	Bronco
7.	"Será Mejor Que Te Vayas"	Los Bukis
8.	"La Muñeca Flaca"	Bronco

== Chart performance ==
Standard edition

Chart (2004)	Peak position
US Billboard Top Latin Albums	1
US Billboard Regional/Mexican Albums	1
US Billboard 200	127

Recuerdos con Amor edition

Chart (2005)	Peak position
US Billboard Top Latin Albums	2
US Billboard Regional/Mexican Albums	1
US Billboard 200	120
