= Los Grandes =

Compilation album by Marco Antonio Solís & Joan Sebastian
- Released: April 2, 2002
- Genre: Latin
- Label: Fonovisa

Marco Antonio Solís & Joan Sebastian chronology
En Vivo, Vol. 2 (2001)	Los Grandes (2002)	La Historia Continúa... (2003)

Los Grandes is a compilation album released by Marco Antonio Solís and Joan Sebastian on April 2, 2002

== Track listing ==
No.	Title	Writer(s)	Length
1.	"Secreto de Amor"	Joan Sebastian	4:35
2.	"Si Te Pudiera Mentir"	Marco Antonio Solís	4:24
3.	"Un Idiota"	Joan Sebastian	3:22
4.	"La Venia Bendita"	Marco Antonio Solís	3:13
5.	"Juliantla"	Joan Sebastian	3:12
6.	"Asi Como Te Conoci"	Marco Antonio Solís	4:23
7.	"Tatuajes"	Joan Sebastian	3:34
8.	"Me Vas a Hacer Llorar"	Marco Antonio Solís	3:25
9.	"Rumores"	Joan Sebastian	3:46
10.	"Si No Te Hubieras Ido"	Marco Antonio Solís	4:49
11.	"Veinticinco Rosas"	Joan Sebastian	3:55
12.	"Recuerdos, Tristeza y Soledad"	Marco Antonio Solís	4:30

== Charts ==
Chart (2002)	Peak position
US Billboard Regional Mexican Albums	9
US Billboard Top Latin Albums	14
