= Chalino Sánchez =

Mexican singer (1960–1992)

- Sánchez c. 1990

Background information
- Also known as: El Compa Chalino (Buddy Chalino); El Pelavacas (Cow Skin Peeler); El Rey del Corrido (The King of Corrido); El Idolo Sinaloense (The Sinaloan Idol); El Idolo de Sinaloa (The Idol of Sinaloa)
- Born: Rosalino Sánchez Félix; 30 August 1960: Rancho El Guayabo, Culiacán Municipality, Sinaloa, Mexico
- Died: c. 16 May 1992 (aged 31) Culiacán, Sinaloa, Mexico
- Cause of death: Murder (gunshot wounds)
- Genres: Regional Mexican; corrido; norteño; banda
- Occupations: Singer; composer
- Instruments: Vocals
- Years active: 1984–1992
- Labels: RR (Rosalino Records); Cintas Acuario; Disco Linda; Musart
- Spouse: Marisela Vallejos Felix (m. 1984)

Rosalino "Chalino" Sánchez Félix (30 August 1960 – 16 May 1992) was a Mexican singer and composer. Posthumously called "The King of Corrido" (Spanish: El Rey del Corrido), Sánchez is often considered the most influential Mexican narcocorrido singer of the late twentieth century. His songs mostly contained stories of murder and organized crime in nineteenth- and twentieth-century Northern Mexico, including topics such as the Mexican Revolution, drug cartels, drug trafficking, serial killers, Mexican standoffs, and murder–suicides. He also composed and sang romantic and radio-friendly songs.

Sánchez grew up in a poor, violent, rural area of Sinaloa, the youngest of eight children. His father died when Sánchez was six years old. At age 15, Sánchez shot and killed a man who had raped his sister two years prior. In 1975, he crossed the border to the United States of America. In 1984, his brother (also involved in the cartel) Armando was murdered in a hotel in Tijuana, inspiring him to compose his first corrido. While serving time in prison for petty crimes, Sánchez composed songs for inmates that had stories they wanted to preserve in sentimental ballads.

On 25 January 1992, Sánchez was shot while performing in Coachella, California, United States, but survived. He fired back in self-defense, killing a bystander. Just a few months later, on May 16, Sánchez was bound and shot twice in the head by unidentified assailants dressed as state police officers after a performance in Culiacán, in which he was handed a note commonly believed to have contained a death threat. Though Sánchez's murder remains unsolved, it is suspected to be linked to a Mexican cartel or revenge.

== Early life and career ==
Rosalino Sánchez Félix was born on "Las Flechas", a small ranch in El Guayabo, a small farming municipality in Sinaloa. His birth name was Rosalino, but he preferred his nickname "Chalino" since he believed that Rosalino sounded too feminine. He was the youngest of eight children. Sánchez's parents were Santos Sánchez, who died when Chalino was six years old; and Senorina Félix. Sánchez grew up in an impoverished environment, with limited opportunities, and was surrounded by violence.

In September 1975, at age 15, Sánchez shot and killed a man who had raped his sister two years prior. He then moved to Tijuana, where he worked as a "coyote", smuggling undocumented immigrants into the United States. In October 1975, Sánchez himself fled to the U.S. to avoid Mexican authorities. He worked on farms across the Pacific Northwest before moving in with his aunt in Inglewood, California, in January 1983. In Inglewood he washed dishes, sold cars and dealt small quantities of marijuana and cocaine. He also had a stint as a driver for Rigo Campos, the owner of a restaurant in Bell Gardens who was involved in the drug business, and who was eventually assassinated. In addition, Sánchez helped his older brother, Armando, run an immigrant-smuggling operation.

In May 1983, Sánchez met Marisela Vallejos, from Mexicali, Baja California, through a cousin. They married in 1984 while she was pregnant with their son, Adán Sánchez, and later had a second child, Cynthia Sánchez Vallejos. They were married for nine years until Sánchez's death.

In July 1984, Sánchez's brother Armando was shot and killed in a hotel in Tijuana, which inspired Sánchez to compose his first corrido, "Recordando A Armando Sánchez." Around this time, he was arrested and served a few months in La Mesa prison for petty crimes. Sánchez composed songs for his fellow inmates, many of whom were drug traffickers and were illiterate, turning their stories into songs. He was paid in cash, watches, and guns.

Sánchez was introduced to Ángel Parra, who arranged for the singer to record his first demos at his studio with a norteño group, Los 4 De La Frontera. He first began recording in the studio in 1987 and would record fifteen songs, each commissioned by a local "valiente", and make a single copy for each client. By the third recording, his clients were ordering extra copies for their friends, and Parra suggested producing 300 cassettes, which sold easily and were followed by reorders. Sánchez sold the cassettes out of his car trunk or at flea markets, and performed at quinceañeras and baptisms.

By 1989, Sánchez had given up his day jobs, had formed his own record label, and was hustling his cassettes full-time. The previous year, he'd met Nacho Hernández, whose band Los Amables del Norte became his regular accompanists. Sánchez became well known throughout Southern California and performed at several venues such as the El Parral Nightclub in South Gate and El Farallon Nightclub in Lynwood.

Sánchez connected with Pedro Rivera, who had set up Cintas Acuario, a small recording studio in Long Beach, California, to which Sánchez signed a recording contract. Rivera, the father of Lupillo Rivera, Juan Rivera, and Jenni Rivera, was one of the first to release Sánchez's albums.

=== Coachella shooting (January 1992) ===
Los Arcos Nightclub Shooting
- Location: 33°40′04″N 116°10′56.6″W; Plaza Los Arcos Nightclub; 52447 Harrison St; Coachella, CA 92236, U.S.
- Date: 25 January 1992; 34 years ago c. 11:40 PM – c. 12:40 AM (PST)
- Target: Chalino Sánchez, 31
- Attack type: Mass shooting
- Weapon: C. Sánchez, M1911 (10mm); E. Gallegos, Pistol (.25ACP)
- Deaths: 1 (Claudio Rene Carranza, 20)
- Injuries: 10 (10, injured with bullet crossfire)
- Perpetrators: Eduardo Gallegos, 32
- Motive: Inconclusive

On 25 January 1992, Sánchez performed at the Plaza Los Arcos restaurant and nightclub in Coachella, California, with 400 people in attendance. Eduardo Gallegos, aged 32, an unemployed mechanic from Thermal who was under the influence of heroin and alcohol, requested the song "El Gallo de Sinaloa" to be played. Immediately afterwards, Gallegos jumped on stage and fired four shots at Sánchez. In retaliation, Sánchez fired his gun at Gallegos; the firearm jammed and Sánchez threw it at Gallegos.

Gallegos' four shots hit Sánchez twice in the chest near his armpit, striking his lung; one bullet hit the accordionist in the thigh. Sánchez's shots missed Gallegos, but hit and killed 20-year-old Claudio Rene Carranza. In total, nine to fifteen shots were fired and approximately ten people were hit. Gallegos was wrestled to the floor by a bystander and was shot in the mouth with his own pistol. Gallegos and Sánchez were both transported to Desert Regional Hospital in Palm Springs, in critical condition.

Gallegos, who survived his wounds, was convicted of attempted murder and was sentenced to 20 years to life in prison; he was paroled in 2023.

The shooting gave Sánchez additional press, and his sales and radio airplay increased, particularly for his non-narco song "Nieves de Enero". At his next performance in Los Angeles, the club reached capacity six hours before Sánchez was due to perform.

== Murder ==
Approximate key
1 Sanchez leaves Salón Bugambilias after midnight
2 Sanchez is pulled over by suspects at a roundabout
3 Sanchez's body is found in the early morning near an irrigation ditch

After the January 1992 shooting and the increase in notoriety that followed, Sánchez began fearing for his life. He distributed his gun collection to his friends and sold the rights to his songs to Musart Records, receiving just enough money for his wife to buy a house but depriving his family of any future royalties.

His record team warned him against visiting his home state of Sinaloa. Against their advice, he traveled to perform in concerts during the spring of 1992.

On 16 May 1992, during a performance at the Salón Bugambilias in Culiacán, Sánchez was handed a note from someone in the crowd. Immediately, he seemed to become frightened. The note is commonly believed to have been a death threat, but this has never been confirmed. A video shows Sánchez reading the note, showing signs of worry, then crumpling up the note and continuing to sing.

After midnight, Sánchez left the club with two of his brothers, a cousin and several young women in a 1992 Ford vehicle. Their vehicle was pulled over by a group of armed men in black Chevrolet Suburbans. They showed state police identification and told Sánchez that their commander wanted to see him. Sánchez agreed and got into one of their cars.

The following morning, two farmers found Sánchez's body by an irrigation canal near Mexican Federal Highway 15, near the neighborhood of La Presita, Culiacán. He was blindfolded, and his wrists bore rope marks. He had been shot twice in the back of the head. Sánchez was buried in the Panteón de Los Vasitos in Sinaloa, Mexico.

== Legacy, artistry, and influence ==
Sánchez was not a trained singer; he referred to his style as "barking" and knew he was often out of tune. However, he was praised for the sincerity and specificity in his lyrics. Sánchez's songs were often true crime stories. He was referred to as "part Billy the Kid, part Bill Monroe." His fans saw him not just as an entertainer, but "the real thing." Sánchez sang his songs in the Sinaoloan cadence and slang, something no major singer had previously done.

After his death, Sánchez's popularity soared; his widow knew of 150 corridos dedicated to her husband. His vocal tracks were used to create new songs and several imitator acts followed. Sánchez's music continues to be played on many Spanish language radio stations and is popular with young Hispanic listeners. He has also received praise from artists outside his target audience, such as rapper Snoop Dogg.

In 2019, a short film titled Chalino, directed by Michael T. Flores, premiered at the Los Angeles Latino International Film Festival (LALIFF). An eight-part podcast about Sánchez's life and the circumstances of his murder, Ídolo: The Ballad of Chalino Sánchez, was released in February 2022. In 2023, a TV documentary series titled Nunca Tuvo Miedo premiered on Vix. A biopic of Sánchez's life, starring David Castañeda, is currently in production.

== Family ==
Sánchez's son, Adán Sánchez, was also a successful regional Mexican American singer. In 2004, at age 19, while riding in his father's 1990 Ford LTD Crown Victoria, he died in a roll-over car crash after the tire blew.

== Discography ==
During Chalino's lifetime, he only sold cassettes, he never released CDs or vinyl.

- (1988) Corrido de Beto López
- (1988) Corrido de Belén García
- (1988) Chalino Sánchez Acompañado Con Los 4 La Frontera
- (1988) Chalino Sanchez Canta Corridos Al Estilo Culiacán
- (1989) A Todo Sinaloa
- (1989) El Bandido Generoso
- (1989) Y Sigue la Balacera
- (1989) El Pela Vacas
- (1990) Homenaje al Pollero
- (1990) El Gallo de Sinaloa
- (1990) Los Mejores Corridos de Villa
- (1991) Las Nieves de Enero
- (1991) Dos Cruces Negras
- (1991) Alma Enamorada
- (1991) Con La Banda Flor de Campo
- (1991) Los Sufrimientos
- (1991) Jugando Con La Muerte
- (1991) 15 Corridos y Tragedias
- (1992) Hermosísimo Lucero
- (1992) Adiós a Chalino

== Films ==
- Chalino Sanchez: Una Vida De Peligros (2004)
- Pura Raza Chalino Sanchez Vida y Muerte (2006)
- Chalino (2018)
- Nunca Tuvo Miedo (2023)

== See also ==
- Music of Mexico
