= En Vivo, Vol. 2 =

Live album by Marco Antonio Solís
- Released: October 8, 2001
- Recorded: March 21, 1999, El Teatro de Bellas Artes, Puerto Rico
- Genre: Norteño, mariachi, Pop Latino
- Length: 43:07
- Label: Fonovisa

Marco Antonio Solís chronology
En Vivo (2000)	En Vivo, Vol. 2 (2001)	Los Grandes (2002)

En Vivo, Vol. 2 (Eng.: Live, Volume 2) is the second live album released by Marco Antonio Solís from El Teatro de Bellas Artes Puerto Rico on October 8, 2001.

== Track listing ==
All songs written and composed by Marco Antonio Solís

No.	Title	Length
1.	"Que Pena Me Das"	04:25
2.	"La Ultima Parte"	04:45
3.	"A Aquella/Una Mujer Como Tu"	05:00
4.	"Si Te Pudiera Mentir"	04:27
5.	"Me Vas a Hacer Llorar"	03:24
6.	"Muévete"	03:42
7.	"Invéntame"	03:33
8.	"Recuerdos, Tristeza y Soledad"	04:50
9.	"Tu Carcel"	04:50
10.	"La Venia Bendita"	04:17

== Personnel ==
- Victor Aguilar – percussion
- Fabiola Antunez – coros
- Fidel Arreygue – Bass
- Gustavo Borner – engineer, mastering
- Emilio García – drums
- Carlos Francisco Hernandez – engineer
- Salo Loyo – piano
- Rodolfo Luviano – keyboards, musical direction
- Charles Paakkari – engineer
- Fabian Perez – acoustic guitar, electric guitar
- Marco Antonio Solís – musical direction, realization
- Emilsam Velazquez – engineer

== Charts ==
Chart (2001)	Peak position
US Top Latin Albums (Billboard)	27
US Latin Pop Albums (Billboard)	9
