= Sin Riendas =

Studio album by Bronco
- Released: August 3, 2004
- Genre: Norteño, Mariachi, Cumbia
- Label: Fonovisa

Bronco chronology
Crónica de Dos Grandes (2003)	Sin Riendas (2004)	En Vivo (2004)

Sin Riendas (Eng.: Without Ties) is the title of a studio album released by norteño music group Bronco. This album became their third number-one set on the Billboard Top Latin Albums.

== Track listing ==
The information from Billboard.

=== CD track listing ===
No.	Title	Writer(s)	Length
1.	"Basta"	Ramón González Mora	3:35
2.	"Imposible"	José Guadalupe Esparza	3:10
3.	"Señor Mesero"	Oscar Iván Treviño	3:08
4.	"Ya Me Cansé"	José Roberto Martínez	2:59
5.	"Perdóname"	Tato Henriquez, Raúl Ornelas	3:03
6.	"Pasito Presumido"	Esparza	2:58
7.	"Sin Volverte a Ver"	Ornelas, Luis Carlos Monroy	3:12
8.	"El Gigante"	Homero Hernández Jr.	2:59
9.	"Los Compadres"	Esparza	3:29
10.	"Choche Diet"	Armando Arcos, Mary Morín	2:46
11.	"Cuando Yo Me Vaya"	Esparza	3:30
12.	"Sonámbulo"	Roberto Belester	3:03
13.	"Basta [Norteña]"	Mora	3:34
14.	"Perdóname [Pop]"	Henríquez, Ornelas	3:35

== Personnel ==
This information from Allmusic.

- Manolo Díaz — Digital mastering
- Alfonso Guzmán — Arranger
- Manuel Herrara — Engineer
- Hector Miranda — Engineer
- David Eduardo Ruiz — Engineer
- Homero Hernández — Art direction
- Marco Carter — Graphic design

== Chart performance ==
Chart (2004)	Peak position
US Billboard Top Latin Albums	1
US Billboard Regional/Mexican Albums	1
US Billboard Top Heatseekers	5
US Billboard 200	141
