= Evolucion de Amor =

Studio album by Los Temerarios
- Released: January 27, 2009
- Genre: Romantic Music, Latin Music
- Label: Fonovisa

Los Temerarios chronology
Si Tu Te Vas (2008)	Evolucion de Amor (2009)

Evolucion de Amor (Evolution of Love) is a studio album released by the romantic ensemble Los Temerarios. All songs were composed by Adolfo Angel Alva, otherwise is indicated. The tracks were arranged like in the songs of Si Tú Te Vas album.

== Track list ==
No.	Title	Length
1.	"Te Hice Mal"	5:29
2.	"Como Tu"	3:41
3.	"He Intentado Tanto, Tanto (Gustavo Angel Alva)"	4:11
4.	"Si Tu Quisieras"	4:03
5.	"Te Quiero"	3:31
6.	"Mi Vida Eres Tu"	4:09
7.	"Una Lagrima No Basta"	3:51
8.	"Comer a Besos"	3:47
9.	"Eres un Sueño"	5:16
10.	"Siempre Contigo"	3:42

== Charts ==
=== Weekly charts ===
Chart (2009)	Peak position
US Billboard 200	133
US Top Latin Albums (Billboard)	2
US Regional Mexican Albums (Billboard)	2

=== Year-end charts ===
Chart (2009)	Position
US Top Latin Albums (Billboard)	64

== Sales and certifications ==
Region	Certification	Certified units/sales
United States (RIAA)	Gold (Latin)	50,000^{^}
^{^} Shipments figures based on certification alone.
