= Recuerdos del Alma =

Studio album by Los Temerarios
- Released: October 2, 2007
- Genre: Norteño, Mariachi, Pop Latino
- Label: Fonovisa
- Producer: Adolfo Angel Alba

Los Temerarios chronology
Cumbias Románticas (2006)	Recuerdos del Alma (2007)	Si Tú Te Vas (2008)

Professional ratings
Review scores
Source	Rating
Allmusic	4/5 stars

Recuerdos del Alma (Eng.: Soul Memories) is the title of a studio album released by romantic music group Los Temerarios. This album became their seventh number-one set on the Billboard Top Latin Albums.

== Track listing ==
The information from Billboard.

No.	Title	Writer(s)	Length
1.	"Toquen Mariachis Canten"	Leopoldo Dante Tévez	4:21
2.	"Sin Que lo Sepas Tú"	Marco Antonio Vázquez	3:01
3.	"Me Caí de la Nube"	Cornelio Reyna	2:57
4.	"Las Botas de Charro"	José Alfredo Jiménez	3:04
5.	"Que Se Junten Nuestros Brazos"	Reyna	3:08
6.	"Ruleta"	Luis Alcarez	3:02
7.	"Me Caíste del Cielo"	Reyna	3:51
8.	"Ay Amigo"	Felipe "Indio" Jiménez	3:02
9.	"Acá Entre Nos"	Martin Urieta	3:21
10.	"Mujeres Divinas"	Urieta	3:16

== Personnel ==
This information from Allmusic.

- Adolfo Ángel Alba — Producer
- Ernesto Abrego — Keyboards, musical direction
- Mayra Angelica Alba — Production coordination
- Guadalupe Alfaro — Vihuela
- Martin Arano — Percussion
- Onesimo Arce — Guitar
- Jose Luis Ayala — Drums
- Lorenzo González de Gortari — Concert comedian
- César Gómez — Flute
- Bruce Weeden — Mastering, mixing
- Eric Mora — Acoustic guitar
- David Jiménez López — Assistant engineer
- Gabriel Martínez — Engineer
- Clay Perry — Pro Tools
- Adriana Rebold — Graphic design
- Adolfo Pérez Butrón — Photography
- Steve Boxall — Photo assistance

== Chart performance ==
Chart (2007)	Peak position
Mexico AMPROFON Albums Chart	41
US Billboard Top Latin Albums	1
US Billboard Regional/Mexican Albums	1
US Billboard 200	59

== Sales and certifications ==
Region	Certification	Certified units/sales
Mexico (AMPROFON)	Gold	50,000^{^}
United States (RIAA)	Platinum (Latin)	100,000^{^}
^{^} Shipments figures based on certification alone.
