= List of number-one albums of 2004 (Spain) =

Top 100 España is a record chart published weekly by PROMUSICAE (Productores de Música de España), a non-profit organization composed by Spain and multinational record companies. This association tracks record sales (physical and digital) in Spain.

== Albums ==
Week	Chart Date	Album	Artist	Reference
1	December 29	Los Lunnis Nos Vamos a la Cama	Los Lunnis	
2	January 5	Fantasía o Realidad	Alex Ubago	
3	January 12	Los Lunnis Nos Vamos a la Cama	Los Lunnis	
4	January 19	OT III - Album Eurovisión 2004	Operación Triunfo III	
5	January 26	OT III - Album Eurovisión 2004	Operación Triunfo III	
6	February 2	Los Lunnis Nos Vamos a la Cama	Los Lunnis	
7	February 9	Bulería	David Bisbal	
8	February 16	Bulería	David Bisbal	
9	February 23	Bulería	David Bisbal	
10	March 1	¿La Calle Es tuya?	Estopa	
11	March 8	¿La Calle Es tuya?	Estopa	
12	March 15	¿La Calle Es tuya?	Estopa	
13	March 22	10 de Corazón	Camela	
14	March 29	10 de Corazón	Camela	
15	April 5	10 de Corazón	Camela	
16	April 12	10 de Corazón	Camela	
17	April 19	Lo Mejor de Sergio Dalma 1989-2004	Sergio Dalma	
18	April 26	Por vos muero	Miguel Bosé	
19	May 3	Lo Mejor de Sergio Dalma 1989-2004	Sergio Dalma	
20	May 10	Lo Mejor de Sergio Dalma 1989-2004	Sergio Dalma	
21	May 17	El Viaje a Ninguna Parte	Bunbury	
22	May 24	Under My Skin	Avril Lavigne	
23	May 31	El Principio del Comienzo	Antonio Orozco	
24	June 7	El Principio del Comienzo	Antonio Orozco	
25	June 14	Vacaciones con Los Lunnis	Los Lunnis	
26	June 21	Vacaciones con Los Lunnis	Los Lunnis	
27	June 28	Vacaciones con Los Lunnis	Los Lunnis	
28	July 5	Vacaciones con Los Lunnis	Los Lunnis	
29	July 12	Vacaciones con Los Lunnis	Los Lunnis	
30	July 19	Girando Sin Parar	3+2	
31	July 26	Love songs	Julio Iglesias	
32	August 2	Love songs	Julio Iglesias	
33	August 9	Girando Sin Parar	3+2	
34	August 16	Amar Sin Mentiras	Marc Anthony	
35	August 23	Sin noticias de Holanda	Melendi	
36	August 30	Barcos de Papel	David DeMaría	
37	September 6	Para Que No Se Duerman Mis Sentidos	Manolo García	
38	September 13	Para Que No Se Duerman Mis Sentidos	Manolo García	
39	September 20	Para Que No Se Duerman Mis Sentidos	Manolo García	
40	September 27	Para Que No Se Duerman Mis Sentidos	Manolo García	
41	October 4	Mi Sangre	Juanes	
42	October 11	Mi Sangre	Juanes	
43	October 18	Mi Sangre	Juanes	
44	October 25	Greatest Hits	Robbie Williams	
45	November 1	Greatest Hits	Robbie Williams	
46	November 8	No Hay Quinto Malo	Niña Pastori	
47	November 15	Mexico En La Piel	Luis Miguel	
48	November 22	Grandes Éxitos 1991-2004	Alejandro Sanz	
49	November 29	How to Dismantle an Atomic Bomb	U2	
50	December 6	Desde Mi Barrio	Andy & Lucas	
51	December 13	No Me Toques Las Palmas Que Me Conozco	María Isabel	
52	December 20	No Me Toques Las Palmas Que Me Conozco	María Isabel	
53	December 27	No Me Toques Las Palmas Que Me Conozco	María Isabel	

== See also ==
- List of number-one singles of 2004 (Spain)
