= México en la piel (song) =

Mexican mariachi song by José Manuel Fernández Espinosa

"México en la piel" is a 1990 song by the Mexican singer-songwriter José Manuel Fernández Espinosa (born 1958). It was awarded a prize at the 1990 Festival México Lindo y Querido.

The song was covered by María de Lourdes, and used in many live shows, such as the theme for parque Xcaret (Quintana Roo, México) Night Show in 2002. In 2004 the song achieved international recognition as title track for Luis Miguel's collection of Mexican standards México en la piel.
