= 20 Inolvidables (Los Bukis and Los Temerarios album) =

Greatest hits album by Los Bukis and Los Temerarios
- Released: April 1, 2003
- Genres: Latin pop, romantic music, grupera, cumbia, norteño
- Label: Fonovisa

Los Bukis chronology
30 Inolvidables (2003)	20 Inolvidables (2003)	Crónica de Dos Grandes (2004)

Los Temerarios chronology
Una Lágrima No Basta (2002)	20 Inolvidables (2003)	Tributo al Amor (2003)

20 Inolvidables (Eng.: 20 Unforgettables) is a compilation album released by Fonovisa for the Mexican groups Los Bukis and Los Temerarios. It was the second No. 1 album for Los Bukis and the fourth for Los Temerarios on the Billboard Top Latin Albums chart.

== Track listing ==
All tracks performed by Los Bukis were written by Marco Antonio Solís and the tracks performed by Los Temerarios by Adolfo Angel Alba, unless otherwise noted.

No.	Title	Writer(s)	Performing Artist	Length
1.	"Tu Infame Engaño"	Gustavo Angel Alba	Los Temerarios	3:24
2.	"A Donde Vas"		Los Bukis	4:03
3.	"Dice Adios Tu Mano Al Viento"	José Luis Gómez	Los Temerarios	3:05
4.	"Mi Pobre Corazon"		Los Bukis	3:13
5.	"Tu Me Vas a Llorar"		Los Temerarios	3:29
6.	"Ladron de Buena Suerte"		Los Bukis	3:34
7.	"Pequeña"	Miguel Alfaro	Los Temerarios	3:39
8.	"Si Me Recuerdas"		Los Bukis	4:34
9.	"Dímelo"		Los Temerarios	3:30
10.	"Yo Te Necesito"		Los Bukis	3:14
11.	"No Dejo de Amarte"		Los Temerarios	2:49
12.	"Te Esperaré"		Los Bukis	3:46
13.	"Ven Porque Te Necesito"		Los Temerarios	3:05
14.	"Tus Mentiras"		Los Bukis	4:55
15.	"Al Otro Lado del Sol"	Oscar Gómez Díaz/Albert Hammond	Los Temerarios	3:33
16.	"Consiguete un Nuevo Viejo"		Los Bukis	3:07
17.	"Si Quiero Volver"		Los Temerarios	3:18
18.	"Como Fui a Enamorarme de Tí"		Los Bukis	4:32
19.	"Soy un Solitario"		Los Temerarios	2:57
20.	"Como Dejar de Amarte"		Los Bukis	3:23

== Chart performance ==
Chart (2003)	Peak position
US Billboard Top Latin Albums	1
US Billboard Regional/Mexican Albums	1
US Billboard 200	127
