= La Historia Continúa... =

Compilation album by Marco Antonio Solís
- Released: October 28, 2003
- Recorded: 1996–2001
- Genre: Pop Latino, cumbia
- Length: 72:54
- Label: Fonovisa

Marco Antonio Solís chronology
| Los Grandes (2002) | La Historia Continúa... (2003) | Dos Grandes (2004) |

La Historia Continúa... (Eng.: The History Continues...) is a compilation album released by Marco Antonio Solís on October 28, 2003. This album became his fourth number-one hit as a solo artist on the Billboard Top Latin Albums chart.

== Track listing ==
All songs written and composed by Marco Antonio Solís except for En Mi Viejo San Juan

| No. | Title | Writer(s) | Length |
|---|---|---|---|
| 1. | "O Me Voy o Te Vas" | | 04:48 |
| 2. | "Mi Eterno Amor Secreto" | | 03:46 |
| 3. | "Donde Estará Mi Primavera" | | 04:17 |
| 4. | "Así Como Te Conocí" | | 04:22 |
| 5. | "En Mi Viejo San Juan (Live)" (Written by Noel Estrada) | Noel Estrada | 03:01 |
| 6. | "La Venia Bendita" | | 03:15 |
| 7. | "Se Va Muriendo Mi Alma" | | 04:34 |
| 8. | "Desde Que Te Perdí" | | 03:43 |
| 9. | "Si No Te Hubieras Ido" | | 04:49 |
| 10. | "Sigue Sin Mi" | | 04:01 |
| 11. | "Boca de Angel" | | 04:03 |
| 12. | "Si Te Pudiera Mentir" | | 04:24 |
| 13. | "Recuerdos, Tristeza y Soledad" | | 04:29 |
| 14. | "Tu Hombre Perfecto" | | 04:24 |
| 15. | "Me Vas a Hacer Llorar" | | 03:25 |
| 16. | "Amor en Silencio" | | 03:57 |
| 17. | "Invéntame" | | 03:32 |
| 18. | "Sé Que Me Va a Dejar" | | 04:22 |

=== DVD ===
| No. | Title | Length |
|---|---|---|
| 1. | "O Me Voy o Te Vas" |
| 2. | "Donde Estará Mi Primavera" |
| 3. | "Sigue Sin Mi" |
| 4. | "Si No Te Hubieras Ido (live)" |
| 5. | "La Venia Bendita" |
| 6. | "Si Te Pudiera Mentir" |
| 7. | "Recuerdos, Tristeza y Soledad" |

== Chart performance ==
| Chart (2003) | Peak position |
|---|---|
| US Billboard Top Latin Albums | 1 |
| US Billboard Latin Pop Albums | 1 |
| US Billboard 200 | 114 |

== Sales and certifications ==
| Region | Certification | Certified units/sales |
|---|---|---|
| Argentina (CAPIF) | 2× Platinum | 80,000^{^} |
| Chile | — | 80,000 |
| Mexico (AMPROFON) | Platinum | 100,000^{^} |
| United States (RIAA) | 5× Platinum (Latin) | 500,000^{^} |
^{^} Shipments figures based on certification alone.

== See also ==
- List of number-one Billboard Top Latin Albums of 2003
