= Siempre Arriba =

Studio album by Bronco: El Gigante de America
- Released: July 15, 2003
- Genre: Norteño, Cumbia
- Label: Fonovisa
- Producer: José Guadalupe Esparza, Ramiro Delgado González, Javier Villarreal Gutiérrez, José Luis Villarreal Gutiérrez

Bronco: El Gigante de America chronology
Indomable (2003)	Siempre Arriba (2003)	Crónica de Dos Grandes (2004)

Professional ratings
Review scores
Source	Rating
Allmusic	3/5 stars

Siempre Arriba (Eng.: Always On Top) is the title of a studio album released by norteño music group Bronco: El Gigante de America. This album became their first number-one hit on the Billboard Top Latin Albums chart and received a nomination for a Grammy Award for Best Mexican/Mexican-American Album.

== Track listing ==
This information from Billboard.com

1. Estoy a Punto (Oswaldo Villarreal) — 3:19
2. Arriba (Humberto Galindo) — 3:20
3. Dalo Por Hecho (Nano Concha/Nicolás Urquiza) — 2:58
4. Un Hombre Con Suerte (José Guadalupe Esparza) — 2:56
5. Antes Que Tu (Marco Pérez/Fabián Tinoco/René Treviño) — 2:59
6. Soñandote (Eloy Mercado) — 2:34
7. Mi Peor Enemigo (Roberto Martínez) — 2:55
8. Corazón Borracho (René Esparza) — 3:21
9. Platicando a Solas (Oscar Ivan Treviño) — 2:51
10. Tumbame Con Tu Tumbao (Esparza) — 2:44
11. El Precio (Miguel Luna/Miguel Mendoza) — 3:32
12. Que Bailen los Niños (Esparza) — 2:41

== Personnel ==
This information from Allmusic.

- Ramiro Delgado González — Producer
- Javier Villarreal Gutiérrez — Producer
- José Luis Villarreal Gutiérrez — Producer
- José Guadalupe Esparza Jiménez — Producer
- Alfonso Valdéz — Engineer, mastering, mixing
- Servando Cano — Musical direction
- Carlos Latapi — Photography
- Iver Soto — Assistant

== Reception ==
=== Chart performance ===
Chart (2003)	Peak position
US Billboard Top Latin Albums	1
US Billboard Regional/Mexican Albums	1
US Billboard 200	97

=== Sales ===
Region	Certification	Certified units/sales
Mexico	—	104,000
