= Y Tenerte Otra Vez =

Studio album by Pepe Aguilar
- Released: March 25, 2003
- Genre: Mariachi
- Label: Sony Norte

Pepe Aguilar chronology
Con Banda (2002)	Y Tenerte Otra Vez (2003)	Con Orgullo Por Herencia (2003)

Y Tenerte Otra Vez (And Have You Again) is a studio album released by Pepe Aguilar. This album became his first number one album on the Billboard Top Latin Albums chart.

== Track listing ==
This track listing from Billboard.com

1. Me Falta Valor (Teodoro Bello) — 3:36
2. Va Por Tu Suerte (Paulina Vargas) — 3:09
3. Alma en Pena (Miguel Luna) — 3:38
4. Yo la Amo (Luna) — 4:16
5. He Venido a Pedirte Perdón (Juan Gabriel) — 4:37
6. Mi Buen Corazón (Amanda Miguel/Graciela Carvallo) — 4:49
7. A Pierna Suelta (Martín Urieta) — 3:35
8. El Mecate (Manuel Monterrosas) — 2:38
9. Indispensable (Pepe Aguilar/Luna) — 4:21
10. Caída Libre (Manuel Eduardo Castro) — 3:35
11. El Hombre Es Hombre (Manuel Durán Durán) — 3:19
12. Y Tenerte Otra Vez (Juan Manuel Pernas/Aguilar) — 5:04
13. Y Ahora Olvídame (Jesús Monarrez) — 4:32
14. Mi Casa de Teja (Roberto Fausto) — 3:29

== Chart performance ==
Chart (2003)	Peak position
US Billboard Top Latin Albums	1
US Billboard Regional/Mexican Albums	1
US Billboard Top Heatseekers	2
US Billboard 200	118

== Sales and certifications ==
Region	Certification	Certified units/sales
Mexico (AMPROFON)	Gold	75,000^{^}
United States (RIAA)	2× Platinum (Latin)	200,000^{^}
^{^} Shipments figures based on certification alone.
