= Veintisiete =

Studio album by Los Temerarios
- Released: June 29, 2004
- Genres: Norteño, Mariachi, Pop Latino
- Label: Fonovisa
- Producers: Rudy Perez, Adolfo Ángel Alba

Los Temerarios chronology
Tributo al Amor (2003)	Veintisiete (2004)	Regalo de Amor (2004)

Veintisiete (Eng.: Twenty Seven) is the title of a cover album released by romantic music group Los Temerarios. This album became their sixth number-one set on the Billboard Top Latin Albums and received a nomination for a Grammy Award for Best Mexican/Mexican-American Album. This album has gone gold in US.

== Track listing ==
Information from Billboard

=== CD track listing ===
No.	Title	Writer(s)	Length
1.	"Qué de Raro Tiene"	Martín Urieta	3:21
2.	"La Diferencia"	Juan Gabriel	2:51
3.	"Renunciación"	Antonio Herrera Váldez	3:10
4.	"Idos de la Mente"	Cornelio Reyna	2:56
5.	"Llorarás"	Rafael Ramírez Villarreal	3:03
6.	"Las Llaves de Mi Alma"	Vicente Fernández	2:55
7.	"Sombras (Aka Sombras Nada Mas)"	Francisco Lomuto, José María Contursi	3:01
8.	"Tu Camino y el Mío"	Herrera	2:59
9.	"Ni en Defensa Propia"	Ramón Ortega Contreras	2:26
10.	"En Mi Viejo San Juan"	Noel Estrada	2:59
11.	"Caminado Voy (Gracias)"	Adolfo Ángel Alba	3:50
12.	"Que de Raro Tiene (version Bolero Ranchero)"	Urieta	3:55
13.	"Que de Raro Tiene (version Pop)"	Urieta	3:07

=== DVD track listing ===
This information from Allmusic.

== Music videos ==
- "Que de Raro Tiene"
- "Comer a Besos"

== Personnel ==
This information from Allmusic.

- Adolfo Ángel Alba – Arranger, keyboards, producer, direction
- Rudy Pérez – Arranger, keyboards, producer, direction
- Ernesto Abrego – Music coordinator
- Gabriel Martínez – Engineer
- Bruce Weeden – Engineer, mixing
- Clay Perry – Keyboards, programming
- Felix Alcala – drums
- Jose Luis Ayala – Drums
- Andres Bermudez – Mixing
- Joel Numa – Mixing
- Jose Esquivel – Trumpet
- Xavier Serano – Trumpet
- Julio Hernandez – Bass
- Manny López – Guitar
- Wendy Pedersen – vocals
- Javier Solís – Vocals
- Cornelio Reyna – Vocals
- Vicente Fernández - Additional vocals
- Angela Duque – Graphic design

== Chart performance ==
Chart (2004)	Peak position
US Billboard 200	91
US Billboard Top Latin Albums	1
US Billboard Regional/Mexican Albums	1

== Sales and certifications ==
Region	Certification	Certified units/sales
Mexico (AMPROFON)	Platinum+Gold	150,000^{^}
United States (RIAA)	Gold	500,000^{^}
^{^} Shipments figures based on certification alone.
