= Herencia Musical: 20 Corridos Inolvidables =

Greatest hits album by Los Tigres del Norte
- Released: July 1, 2003
- Genre: Norteño
- Length: 67:00 (CD)
- Label: Fonovisa

Los Tigres del Norte chronology
La Reina del Sur (2002)	Herencia Musical: 20 Corridos Inolvidables (2003)	Pacto de Sangre (2004)

Professional ratings
Review scores
Source	Rating
Allmusic	4/5 stars

Herencia Musical: 20 Corridos Inolvidables (Eng.: 20 Unforgettable Corridos) is the title of a compilation album released by Regional Mexican band Los Tigres del Norte. This album became their fourth number-one hit on the Billboard Top Latin Albums chart.

== Track listing ==
This information from Billboard.com

=== CD ===
1. Morir Matando (Teodoro Bello) — 3:17
2. El Zorro de Ojinaga (Paulino Vargas) — 3:38
3. La Paloma (Sebastian Yradier) — 3:04
4. El Gringo y el Mexicano (Adolfo Salas) — 3:06
5. La Fuga del Rojo (Vargas) — 3:15
6. Tiempos de Mayo (Enrique Calencia) — 3:31
7. El Tahúr (Adolfo Salas) — 3:37
8. El Corrido del Doctor (Vargas) — 3:34
9. El Rengo del Gallo Giro (Bello) — 3:05
10. El Hijo Tijuana (Francisco Quintero) — 3:39
11. El Tamal (Bello) — 3:07
12. Los Tres de Zacatecas (Bello) — 2:23
13. El Avión de la Muerte (Bello) — 4:04
14. Pacas de a Kilo (Bello) — 3:35
15. En Nombre de Tu Padre (Vargas) — 2:52
16. La Resortera (Bello) — 3:21
17. Jefe de Jefes (Bello) — 3:33
18. El Tarasco (Vargas) — 3:40
19. También las Mujeres Pueden (Quintero) — 3:36
20. Gabino Barrera (Víctor Cordero) — 3:15

=== DVD ===
1. La Reina del Sur (Bello)
2. Jefe de Jefes (Bello)
3. De Rama en Rama (Bello)
4. El Triunfo (Jessie Armenta)
5. Los Dos Plebes (Quintero)
6. Con Qué Derecho (Demetrio Vite)

== Chart performance ==
Chart (2003)	Peak position
US Billboard Top Latin Albums	1
US Billboard Regional/Mexican Albums	1
US Billboard 200	67

== Sales and certifications ==
Region	Certification	Certified units/sales
Mexico (AMPROFON)	Gold	50,000^{^}
^{^} Shipments figures based on certification alone.
