= Grupo Climax =

Mexican dance group

Grupo Climax is a dance group from Veracruz, Mexico, created by José Antonio Fuentes Atilano, best known by his stage name DJ Oscar Lobo (also known as Oskar Lobo), in 2004.

== Musical Career ==
The group released a successful recording titled "La Mesa Que Más Aplauda", which originated in collaboration with another artist, DJ Mailo. It became the mega-hit Za Za Za, which peaked at number one in the Billboard Top Latin Albums for five consecutive weeks.
