= Amor y Lágrimas =

Studio album by Adán "Chalino" Sánchez
- Released: April 20, 2004
- Genre: Norteño
- Label: Sony
- Producer: Abel De Luna

Adán "Chalino" Sánchez chronology
Canta Corridos (2003)	Amor y Lágrimas (2004)	En Sus Inicios, Vol. 2 (2004)

Amor y Lágrimas (Eng.: Love and Tears) is the title of a studio album released by mexican-american performer Adán "Chalino" Sánchez. This album became his first number-one set on the Billboard Top Latin Albums and the first released after his death in 2004.

== Track listing ==
The information from Billboard

No.	Title	Writer(s)	Length
1.	"Amor y Lágrimas"	José Gaytán	3:53
2.	"Ya Me Voy"		2:51
3.	"Nadie Es Eterno"	Dario Gómez	3:16
4.	"Puñales de Fuego"	Cornelio Reyna	3:14
5.	"Corrido de Pedro"	Memo Avilez Lugo	4:08
6.	"Caminos de la Vida"	Noé Baena	2:49
7.	"La Cerca"		2:22
8.	"Guerrillero 100%"		3:16
9.	"El Arbol"		3:25
10.	"La Conmemorativa"		2:58

== Chart performance ==
Chart (2004)	Peak position
US Billboard Top Latin Albums	1
US Billboard Regional/Mexican Albums	1
US Billboard 200	70
