= Za Za Za =

Studio album by Grupo Climax
- Released: 2004
- Recorded: Veracruz, Mexico
- Genre: Latin music
- Label: Balboa
- Producer: Oscar Fuentes Atilano

Grupo Climax chronology
Za Za Za (2004)	Za Za Za: Los Remixes (2004)

Za Za Za is a studio album released in 2004 by DJ Oscar Lobo and his Grupo Climax. This album became their first number-one set on the Billboard Top Latin Albums. The song "El Za Za Za" contains samples of "El Cepillo" by Fulanito.

== Track listing ==
The information from Billboard

No.	Title	Writer(s)	Length
1.	"El Za Za Za (Mesa Que Más Aplauda)"	Oscar Lobo	4:47
2.	"El Baile de la Tortuga y el Caiman"	Lobo	3:23
3.	"La Bamba Cascabelera"	Lobo	3:23
4.	"Mueve Tu Cuerpo"	Mr. Grillo, Lobo	3:48
5.	"Entre El y Yo"	Lobo, Ian Resendiz	3:18
6.	"Himno Climax"	Lobo	2:37
7.	"Cumbia Con Sabor"	Mr. Grillo	3:43
8.	"Bienvenidos"	Mr. Grillo, Lobo	3:07
9.	"El Chupi Chupi"	Mr. Grillo, Lobo	3:01
10.	"Toda la Noche"	Mr. Grillo, Lobo	3:35
11.	"El Za Za Za (Mesa Que Mas Aplauda) [Radio Edit]"	Mr. Grillo, Lobo	4:04
12.	"El Za Za Za (Mesa Que Mas Aplauda) [Remix]"	Mr. Grillo, Lobo	6:38

== Personnel ==
The album's personnel are:

- Oscar Fuentes Atilano — Producer
- Rex Navarrete — Arranger
- César Martínez — Accordion
- Juan Muro — Art Direction, mixing

== Chart performance ==
Chart (2004)	Peak position
US Billboard Top Latin Albums	1
US Billboard Regional/Mexican Albums	1
US Billboard Top Heatseekers	1
US Billboard Top Independent Albums	4
US Billboard 200	79
