= México en la Piel (album) =

Studio album by Luis Miguel
- Released: 9 November 2004
- Recorded: July 2004
- Studios: Ocean Way; Record Plant Studios; Chalice Studios (Hollywood, CA)
- Genre: Mariachi
- Length: 39:39
- Language: Spanish
- Label: Warner Music Latina
- Producer: Luis Miguel

Luis Miguel chronology
33 (2003)	México en la Piel (2004)	Grandes Éxitos (2005)

Luis Miguel video chronology
Mis Boleros Favoritos (2002)	México en la Piel: Edición Diamante (2005)	Grandes Éxitos (2005)

Singles from México en la Piel
- 1. "El Viajero" Released: 15 September 2004; 2. "Que Seas Feliz" Released: 26 September 2004; 3. "Sabes una Cosa" Released: 22 January 2005; 4. "Échame a Mí la Culpa" Released: 2005

Singles from México en la Piel: Edición Diamante
- 1. "Mi Ciudad" Released: 29 August 2005

México en la Piel (Mexico in the Flesh) is the sixteenth studio album by Mexican singer Luis Miguel. Released on 9 November 2004 by Warner Music Latina, it is Miguel's first mariachi album. The record contains thirteen mariachi covers, accompanied by the Vargas de Tecalitlán folk ensemble. Armando Manzanero was its musical director, and Miguel its producer. The album was recorded at Ocean Way Recording in Hollywood, California in July 2004. A special edition, México en la Piel: Edición Diamante, was released on 5 September 2005 with two additional songs and a DVD with five music videos. Four singles were released from the album: "El Viajero", "Que Seas Feliz", "Sabes una Cosa", and "Échame a Mí la Culpa". "Mi Ciudad" was released as a single from the special edition.

The album received mixed reviews from music critics; some praised Miguel's delivery and Mariachi Vargas's music, and others found its arrangements too smooth. However, it received the Grammy Award for Best Mexican/Mexican-American Album and the Latin Grammy Award for Best Ranchero Album and reached number one in Argentina, Spain and on the Billboard Top Latin Albums chart in the United States. By 2006, the album had sold over two million copies. Miguel embarked on a two-year tour which grossed over $90 million, the highest-grossing tour by a Latin artist.

== Background and recording ==
Miguel released 33, a pop album with original material, in 2003. It received unfavorable reviews from music critics (who found the album too similar to his previous pop recordings), and was commercially unsuccessful. On 4 August 2004, Miguel announced that he would release an album of mariachi standards in November. As to why he chose to record an album of mariachi covers, he said: "I did it with the intention of rescuing, to revive them for young people, songs that can not be forgotten", calling it a tribute to his roots. México en la Piel was recorded at Hollywood's Ocean Way Recording in July 2004. Miguel collaborated with Vargas de Tecalitlán on the album and enlisted his longtime collaborator, Mexican singer-songwriter Armando Manzanero, to assist with its musical direction. Miguel produced the album himself.

== Promotion and singles ==
"El Viajero", the album's first single, was released on 15 September 2004 to coincide with Mexican Independence Day. Its music video was filmed in Amatitán, Jalisco and was directed by Pedro Torres. The second single from the album, "Que Seas Feliz", was released on 26 September 2004. The single peaked at number three on the Billboard Hot Latin Songs chart and number nine on the Regional Mexican Songs chart. Its video, also filmed in Amatitán and directed by Torres, co-stars Mexican actress Yadhira Carrillo. "Que Seas Feliz" is the main theme for the Mexican telenovela, Apuesta por un amor (2004). "Sabes una Cosa" was released as the album's third single on 22 January 2005 and peaked at numbers eight and nine on the Hot Latin Songs and Regional Mexican Songs charts, respectively. The album's fourth single, "Échame a Mí la Culpa", reached number 18 on the Hot Latin Songs chart. "De Qué Manera Te Olvido" was released as a promo single in Spain. "Mi Ciudad" was released on 29 August 2005 as a single promoting the special edition of México en la Piel.

To promote México en la Piel, Miguel began a tour on 13 September 2005 at the Save Mart Center in Fresno, California. The singer toured the United States, Mexico, South America and Spain. The tour ended on 23 September 2007 at the Hyundai Pavilion in San Bernardino, California. It grossed over $90 million from 124 performances and over 1.4 million spectators, the highest-grossing tour by a Latin artist. The tour's set list consisted of mariachi songs from México en la Piel, boleros and uptempo tracks from Miguel's previous albums. He included songs from his holiday album, Navidades (2006), for the tour's fourth leg.

== Release ==
México en la Piel was released on 9 November 2004 by Warner Music Latina. The album has twelve cover songs and a bonus track: "Sabes una Cosa". On 31 January 2005, Warner Music reissued the album with alternate back-cover artwork. Its back cover originally featured a sepia-tinted Mexican flag, but the Mexican government asked the record label to remove it due to Mexican law which prohibits altering the flag's colors. The back cover was changed to a photo of a charro on a horse. A special edition of the album, México en la Piel: Edición Diamante, was released on 5 September 2005. It had two new tracks ("Por un Amor" and "Mi Ciudad") and a DVD with five music videos of Miguel's mariachi songs.

Luis Miguel "Que Seas Feliz"
An 18-second sample of Miguel's cover of Consuelo Velázquez's "Que Seas Feliz". Alex Henderson of AllMusic wrote: "Among non-Latino audiences, "Que Seas Feliz" isn't as well known as "Bésame Mucho." But the song is a longtime favorite in Mexico, and Miguel has no problem doing Velásquez's poignant lyrics justice."

== Critical reception and accolades ==
Professional ratings
Review scores
Source	Rating
AllMusic	4/5 stars
Chicago Sun-Times	2/4 stars
Los Angeles Times	2/4 stars

AllMusic critic Alex Henderson gave México en la Piel four out of five stars, praising Miguel for recording a mariachi album. Henderson also praised Mariachi Vargas's involvement, and called the album "among [Miguel's] most essential releases." Billboard editor Leila Cobo also gave the album a positive review, saying that Miguel's vocal delivery is "infused with a gusto and genuine enthusiasm" and calling the tracks "stylized and radio-friendly." Laura Emerick of the Chicago Sun-Times gave it two out of four stars, writing that Miguel performs with his "trademark full-bore style" and Manzanero's arrangements were "strictly retro", with "glossy" orchestration. Los Angeles Times critic Augustin Gurza also gave the album two out of four stars, writing that the tracks were "dressed up by busy orchestral arrangements that replace country grittiness with urbane pretensions." According to Gurza, Mariachi Vargas couldn't "muster much mariachi spirit" and the record seemed "soulless." Mario Tarradell of The Dallas Morning News called it Miguel's "best disc in years", noting that the album "showcases the Mexican vocalist challenging himself with a batch of passionate songs".

At the 6th Annual Latin Grammy Awards in 2005, México en la Piel was the Best Ranchero Album. At the 13th Annual Billboard Latin Music Awards that year, it was the Best Regional Mexican Album by a Male Solo Artist. The album was the Best Mexican/Mexican-Album at the 2006 Grammy Awards.

== Commercial performance ==
In the United States, México en la Piel debuted atop the Billboard Top Latin Albums chart on the week of 27 November 2004 and spent five weeks at number one. The album ended 2005 as the seventh-bestselling Latin album in the country, and was certified quadruple platinum in the Latin field by the Recording Industry Association of America for shipping 400,000 copies. It peaked at number 37 on the Billboard 200 and topped the Regional Mexican Albums charts. In Mexico, the album topped the Top 100 Mexico chart and was 2005's third-bestselling record. It was certified triple platinum and diamond by the Asociación Mexicana de Productores de Fonogramas y Videogramas for shipping 800,000 copies.

México en la Piel topped the Argentine album chart, and was certified double platinum by the Argentine Chamber of Phonograms and Videograms Producers for shipping 80,000 copies. It also reached number one in Spain, and was certified platinum for shipping 100,000 units. The album was certified platinum in Chile and Colombia, and double platinum in Venezuela. By 2011, México en la Piel had sold over two million copies.

== Track listing ==
No.	Title	Writer(s)	Length
1.	"El Viajero"	Roberto Sierra García; José "Pepe" Martínez	3:36
2.	"Entrega Total"	Abelardo Pulido	2:13
3.	"Échame a Mí la Culpa"	José Ángel Espinoza	3:09
4.	"México en la Piel"	José Manuel Fernández Espinoza	3:29
5.	"Cruz de Olvido"	Juan Zaizar	3:30
6.	"De Qué Manera Te Olvido"	Federico Méndez	2:31
7.	"Luz de Luna"	Álvaro Carrillo	2:54
8.	"Motivos"	Italo Pizzolante	3:32
9.	"Cielo Rojo"	Juan Zaizar; David Zaizar	2:55
10.	"Paloma Querida"	José Alfredo Jiménez	2:45
11.	"Que Seas Feliz"	Consuelo Velázquez	3:05
12.	"Un Mundo Raro"	Jiménez	2:40
13.	"Sabes una Cosa" (Bonus track)	Manuel Lozano Gallo; Rubén Fuentes	3:20

Edición Diamante
No.	Title	Writer(s)	Length
14.	"Por un Amor"	Gilberto Parra	2:42
15.	"Mi Ciudad"	Guadalupe Trigo	3:37
Total length:			45:59

Edición Diamante DVD
No.	Title	Writer(s)	Video director	Length
1.	"Que Seas Feliz" (from México en la Piel, 2004)	Velázquez	Pedro Torres	3:06
2.	"El Viajero" (from México en la Piel, 2004)	Sierra; Martínez	Torres	3:40
3.	"Y" (from Vivo, 2000)	Mario de Jesús Báez	David Mallet	2:57
4.	"La Bikina" (from Vivo, 2000)	Fuentes	Mallet	3:01
5.	"La Media Vuelta" (from Segundo Romance, 1994)	Jiménez	Torres	4:28

== Personnel ==
Adapted from the México en la Piel liner notes:

=== Performance credits ===
Mariachi Vargas de Tecalitlán

- José "Pepe" Martínez – director, 1st violin
- José Martínez Pérez – violin, copyist
- Fernando Martínez Arreguín – violin
- Steeven Sandoval – violin
- Alberto Alfaro – violin
- Gustavo Alvarado – trumpet
- Federico Torres – trumpet
- Enrique Santiago – guitarron
- Víctor Cárdenas – vihuela
- Juan Pedro Vargas – guitar
- Julio Martínez – arpa
- Xavier Serrano – trumpet
- Juan Rodríguez – violin
- Martin Alfaro – violin
- Felipe Pérez – violin
- Julio Hernández – violin

Additional musicians

- Robert L. Becker – viola
- Darrin McCann – viola
- Larry Corbett – cello
- Daniel W. Smith – cello
- Phillip Ayling – oboe, flute
- Kim Hutchcroft – flute
- Richard Todd – french horn
- Brad Warnaar – french horn
- Daniel Greco – marimba
- Tommy Morgan – harmonica
- Ramón Stagnaro – acoustic guitar
- Luis Conte – percussion

Chorus

- Paulina Aguirre
- Juan Del Castillo
- Bambi (Natisse) Jones
- Carlos Murguía
- Daniel Navarro
- Kenny O'Brien
- Gisa Vatcky
- Tata Vega

=== Technical credits ===
- Luis Miguel – producer
- Alejandro Asensi – executive producer
- Francisco Loyo – musical co-producer
- Rafa Sardina – engineer, mixer
- David Reitzas – mixer
- Shari Sutcliffe – production coordination
- Armando Manzanero – pre-production
- Diego Manzanero – pre-production
- Andrew McPherson – photography
- Kerry Koontz – additional photography
- Jeremy Woodhouse – additional photography
- Jeri Heiden – graphic design
- Glen Nakasako – graphic design
- Joanne Jaworowski – graphic design
- Salo Loyo – digital editing engineer
- Michael Eleopoulos – recording assistant
- Jeff Burns – recording assistant
- Alan Mason – mixing assistant
- Kevin Szymanski – mixing assistant
- Nicholas Marshall – mixing assistant
- Ron McMaster – mastering engineer
- José "Pepe" Martínez – arrangements
- Cutberto Pérez – arrangements

=== Recording, mixing and mastering locations ===
- Ocean Way Recording Studios, Hollywood, CA – recording
- Record Plant Studios, Hollywood, CA – recording
- Chalice Studios, Hollywood, CA – mixing
- Capitol Mastering, Hollywood, CA – mastering

== Charts ==
=== Weekly charts ===
Chart (2004)	Peak position
Argentina (CAPIF)	1
Mexico (Top 100 Mexico)	1
Spain (PROMUSICAE)	1
US Billboard 200	37
US Top Latin Albums (Billboard)	1
US Regional Mexican Albums (Billboard)	1

=== Monthly charts ===
Chart (2004)	Peak position
Argentina (CAPIF)	1

=== Year-end charts ===
Chart (2004)	Position
Argentina (CAPIF)	8
Mexican Albums (AMPROFON)	1
Spain (PROMUSICAE)	23

Chart (2005)	Position
Mexico (Top 100 Mexico)	3
US Top Latin Albums (Billboard)	7
US Regional Mexican Albums (Billboard)	2

Chart (2006)	Position
Mexico (Top 100 Mexico)	82

Chart (2018)	Position
Mexican Albums (AMPROFON)	83

=== Decade-end charts ===
Decade-end chart performance for México en la Piel
Chart (2000–2009)	Position
US Top Latin Albums (Billboard)	42

== Certifications ==
Region	Certification	Certified units/sales
Argentina (CAPIF)	2× Platinum	80,000^{^}
Chile	Platinum	20,000
Colombia	Platinum	
Mexico (AMPROFON)	Diamond+3× Platinum	800,000^{^}
Spain (Promusicae)	Platinum	100,000^{^}
United States (RIAA)	4× Platinum (Latin)	310,000
Venezuela	2× Platinum	
Summaries
Worldwide	—	2,000,000
^{^} Shipments figures based on certification alone.

== See also ==
- 2004 in Latin music
- List of number-one albums of 2004 (Spain)
- List of number-one Billboard Top Latin Albums of 2004
- List of best-selling Latin albums
- List of best-selling albums in Mexico
