= 30 Inolvidables (Los Bukis album) =

Greatest hits album by Los Bukis
- Released: December 3, 2002
- Genres: Pop Latino, romantic music, grupera, cumbia, norteño
- Label: Fonovisa
- Producer: Marco Antonio Solís

Los Bukis chronology
Favoritas con Amor (2002)	30 Inolvidables (2002)	20 Inolvidables (2003)

30 Inolvidables (Eng.: 30 Unforgettables) is a compilation album released by the Mexican group Los Bukis. This album was their first number-one album in the Billboard Top Latin Albums chart.

The compilation consists of 30 remixed tracks, where the tracks are shortened with spoken word over the track's instrumental.

== Track listing ==
All tracks are written by Marco Antonio Solís

No.	Title	Length
1.	"Como Me Haces Falta"	2:38
2.	"Si Me Quieres"	1:49
3.	"Linda Realidad"	1:08
4.	"Te Tuve y Te Perdí"	1:38
5.	"Falso Amor"	1:41
6.	"No Creo Más en Tí"	3:02
7.	"Ilusión Pasajera"	1:33
8.	"Desde Entonces"	2:42
9.	"En un Rato Más"	2:12
10.	"Mi Fantasía"	2:50
11.	"Por Bien de los Dos"	1:29
12.	"Triste Imaginar"	2:56
13.	"Más Feliz Que Tú"	2:29
14.	"No Volvernos a Ver"	1:33
15.	"Me Siento Solo"	3:06
16.	"La Cumbia Michoacana"	1:24
17.	"Mi Najayita"	1:53
18.	"Los Alambrados"	1:49
19.	"Me Muero Por Que Seas Mi Novia"	2:16
20.	"Necesito Rosas"	1:13
21.	"Al Fin"	1:34
22.	"Dime Dónde y Cuándo"	3:49
23.	"Cuando Me Viste Con Otra"	2:11
24.	"Mi Error"	1:15
25.	"Estabas Tan Linda"	3:46
26.	"Si Tú Te Fueras de Mí"	3:26
27.	"Una Noche Como Esta"	2:54
28.	"Te Quiero a Ti"	1:38
29.	"Pienso"	1:47
30.	"Mi Linda Esposa"	2:24

== Chart performance ==
Chart (2003)	Peak position
US Billboard Top Latin Albums	1
US Billboard Regional/Mexican Albums	1
US Billboard Top Independent Albums	10
US Billboard Top Heatseekers	10
US Billboard 200	169

== Sales and certifications ==
Region	Certification	Certified units/sales
Argentina (CAPIF)	Gold	20,000^{^}
^{^} Shipments figures based on certification alone.
