= Tributo al Amor =

Greatest hits album by Los Temerarios
- Released: November 25, 2003
- Recorded: 1990–2003
- Genre: Balada, Pop Latino, romantic
- Length: 58:00
- Label: Fonovisa

Los Temerarios chronology
20 Inolvidables (2003)	Tributo al Amor (2003)	Veintisiete (2004)

Tributo al Amor (Eng.: Tribute to Love) is a compilation album released by the romantic music band Los Temerarios. This album became their fifth number-one album in the Billboard Top Latin Albums chart.

== Track listing ==
=== CD track listing ===
This information from Billboard.com

No.	Title	Writer(s)	Length
1.	"Caminando Voy"	Adolfo Alba	4:03
2.	"Enamorado de Tí"	Adolfo Alba	4:08
3.	"Quise Olvidarme de Tí"	Adolfo Alba	3:54
4.	"Como Tú"	Adolfo Alba	3:55
5.	"Te Hice Mal"	Adolfo Alba	4:40
6.	"Mi Vida Eres Tú"	Adolfo Alba	4:09
7.	"Sólo Te Quiero a Tí"	Gustavo Alba	3:38
8.	"Te Quiero"	Adolfo Alba	3:13
9.	"Como Te Recuerdo"	Adolfo Alba	5:05
10.	"Creo Que Voy a Llorar"	Gustavo Alba	3:12
11.	"Adiós, Te Extrañaré"	Adolfo Alba	4:56
12.	"Si Tú Quisieras"	Adolfo Alba	4:03
13.	"Por Qué Te Conocí"	Gustavo Alba	4:04
14.	"La Mujer de los Dos"	Adolfo Alba	5:01

=== DVD track listing ===
This information from Allmusic

No.	Title	Writer(s)	Length
1.	"Una Lágrima No Basta"	Adolfo Alba	4:03
2.	"Como Te Recuerdo"	Adolfo Alba	5:05
3.	"Por Qué Te Conocí"	Gustavo Alba	4:04
4.	"Mi Alma Reclama"	Adolfo Alba	4:53
5.	"Ya Me Voy Para Siempre"	José Vaca Flores	4:11
6.	"En La Madrugada Se Fue"	Adolfo Alba	3:47
7.	"Eras Todo Para Mí"	Adolfo Alba	4:49
8.	"He Intentado Tanto, Tanto"	Adolfo Alba	3:48

== Chart performance ==
Chart (2003)	Peak position
US Billboard Top Latin Albums	1
US Billboard Regional/Mexican Albums	1
US Billboard 200	181

== Sales and certifications ==
Region	Certification	Certified units/sales
Mexico (AMPROFON)	Gold	50,000^{^}
^{^} Shipments figures based on certification alone.
