= Adán Sánchez =

Mexican-American singer and composer (1984–2004)

- Born: Adán Santos Sánchez Vallejo; April 14, 1984; Torrance, California, U.S.
- Died: March 27, 2004 (aged 19); Sinaloa, Mexico
- Monuments: 1845 W Empire Ave., Burbank, California
- Occupations: Singer; composer
- Years active: 1994–2004
- Parents: Chalino Sánchez; Marisela Vallejos Félix
- Musical career
- Genres: Banda; Pacific norteño
- Instrument: Vocals

Adán Santos Sánchez Vallejo (April 14, 1984 – March 27, 2004), known professionally as Adán Chalino Sánchez in honor of his father, was a Mexican-American singer and composer. Like his father, he specialized in regional Mexican music.

== Biography ==
Was of Native Mexican descent. Sánchez was born in Torrance, California, the son of singer Chalino Sánchez. He was eight years old when his father was kidnapped and killed in the Mexican state of Sinaloa in 1992. His father's popularity skyrocketed after his death in 1992, giving way to a long series of compilation records, postmortem releases, and dedications. Raised by his mother in Paramount, California, he took up singing, adopting his father nickname, "Chalino", and gained a strong local fan base among Mexican-American teenagers.

Sánchez recorded his first full-length album in 1994, entitled Soy el Hijo de Chalino, notable for the 10-year-old's brash and assertive vocals; the album's rousing title track evokes the style of celebrated singers from Mexico's Golden Age. As he grew into his teens, the majority of Sánchez's album titles began to revolve around the loss of his father, i.e., "La Corona de Mi Padre" and "Homenaje a Mi Padre". He was also able to widen the genre's popularity even further to teenage girls, thanks to his teen idol persona and focus on contemporary romantic ballads.

== Kodak Theatre concert ==
On March 20, 2004, Sánchez gave a concert and made history when he became the youngest headliner and first Regional-Mexican recording artist to sell out the Kodak Theatre in Hollywood. The songs he performed during his concert were "Necesito un amor" (I need a love), "Morenita" (Little brown one), "Paloma negra" (Black dove), "Fui tan feliz" (I was so happy), "Y dicen" (And they say), "Me canse de morir por tu amor" (I'm tired of dying for your love) and a medley of some of his father Chalino’s greatest hits, accompanied by images of him projected on large screens above the stage.

== Death ==
One week after the concert, on March 27, 2004, Sánchez embarked on a promotional road-based tour through his father's home state of Sinaloa, Mexico. He was on his way to a concert in Tuxpan, Nayarit, Mexico, on the highway between Rosario and Escuinapa, when the 1990 Ford LTD Crown Victoria, owned by his father, blew a tire. It was confirmed he was not wearing his seatbelt at the time the accident occurred. According to police, the driver lost control and the vehicle rolled into a ditch. The performer sustained severe head injuries and was found dead at the scene, 10 days shy of his 20th birthday. More than 10,000 fans filled the streets outside the Los Angeles church where his funeral Mass was held.

== Funeral and legacy ==
Sánchez's remains were returned to the United States, where his family scheduled a public wake on April 1, 2004, at the St. John of God Church in Norwalk, California. The event drew national media attention for sparking civil unrest in the neighborhood surrounding the church that evening. As Sánchez was not well known among English-speaking authorities, local law enforcement vastly underestimated his fan base, and they were unprepared when more than 15,000 young people jammed the streets to attend the service. As the day wore on, the crowd of mourners grew out of control—Police were brought in to disperse the crowd, wearing riot gear and carrying pellet guns. Their appearance incited anger among members of the crowd, who surged into the streets, overturning portable toilets and rocking cars. It was reported that Sánchez's aunt Juanita Sánchez wept about the crowd's behavior: "Adán wouldn't have wanted people to act like this. It just causes more pain to the family", she said.

In 2005, a memorial statue was built for Adán in front of La Que Buena radio station in Burbank, California.

== Always and Forever ==
In 2009, Always & Forever, a stage play by Michael Patrick Spillers, dramatized the impact of Sánchez's death on a group of young people in South Los Angeles. The play examines various aspects of Mexican-American culture (such as quinceañeras and Jesús Malverde).

== Discography ==
- Soy El Hijo De Chalino (1994)
- Dios Me Nego (1995)
- La Corona De Mi Padre (2000)
- Con Banda Sinaloense (2001)
- Siempre y Para Siempre (2002)
- Homenaje A Mi Padre (2003)
- Un Sonador (2003)
- Canta Corridos (2003)
- Mis Verdaderos (2004)
- Amor Y Lagrimas (2004)

Albums Released After His Death:

- Si Dios Me Lleva Con El (2005)
- El Unico (2006)
