= José Guadalupe Esparza =

Mexican musician

José Guadalupe "Lupe" Esparza (born 12 October 1954) is a Mexican singer-songwriter and the frontman of the grupero band Bronco. He was born in Durango, but grew up in the city of Apodaca, Nuevo León, where he attended elementary and high school.

From an early age, he wanted to become a singer. In 1974, along with a few of his friends, José Guadalupe Esparza formed a musical group, Bronco. As the lead singer, el Negro (The dark one), as his friends called him, not only was an instant success because of his distinctive voice, but also became very admired as a talented composer. It is because of his peculiar style as a composer, that artists of the stature of Antonio Aguilar, Dulce, Lucero, Lupita Piñeda, Alejandro Fernández, Los Humildes, Mandingo, Banda Machos, Liberación, Guardianes del Amor, Los Rieleros del Norte, Pesado, among others, have made a point to reinterpret, and release their own versions of his songs.

José Guadalupe Esparza has recorded 18 albums with Bronco, and 10 albums solo.
