= Bronco (Mexican band) =

Mexican grupero band

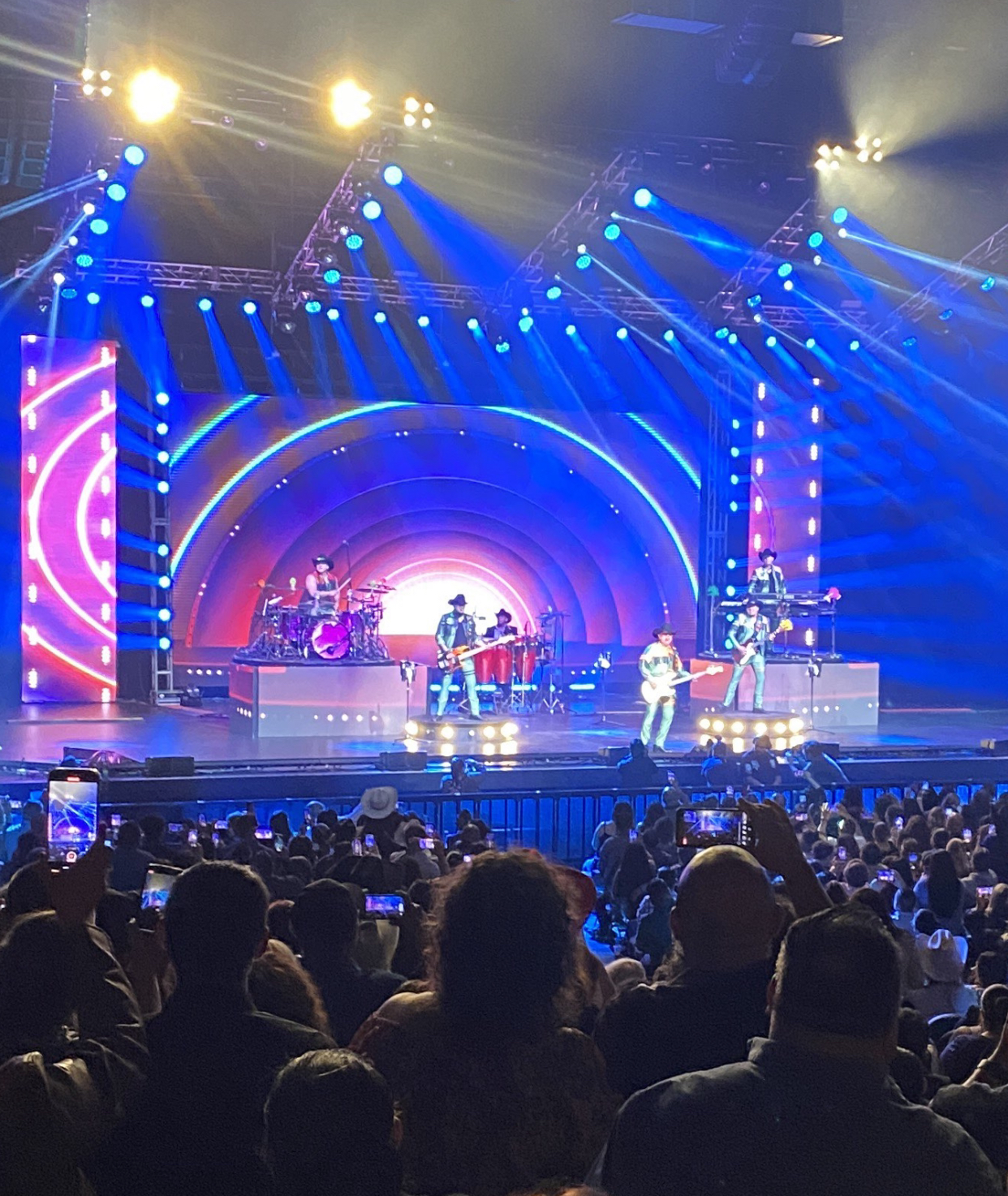
- Bronco performing at the YouTube Theater in June 17, 2023.

Background information
- Also known as: El Gigante de América
- Origin: Apodaca, Nuevo Leon, Mexico
- Genre: Grupero
- Years active: (1979-present)
- Labels: Disa Records (1980–1984); Ariola Records (1985–1997, 2003–2006) (1988-1992), (1995-1997); Fonovisa (1998-1997, 2003-2010)
- Members: José Guadalupe Esparza; Bass guitar and vocals (1980–1997, 2003–present); Jose Adan Esparza; Guitar (2012-present); Rene Esparza; Bass guitar (2012-present); Arsenio Guajardo; Keyboards and accordion (2021-present); Javier Cantú; Drums (2012-present)
- Past members: (dates refer to years active with the group): Javier Villareal Guitar and backing vocals (1980–1997, 2003–2012); Erick Garza Keyboards and accordion (d. 2012) (1980–1986); Jose Luis Villareal "Choche" Bass; Drums (d. 2012) (1980–1997, 2003–2012); Aurelio Esparza Percussion (1980-1997, 2003–2006); Ramiro Delgado Keyboards and accordion (1987-1997, 2003-2019); Ramiro Delgado Jr. Keyboards and accordion (2019-2021)

Bronco is a Mexican grupero band originating from Apodaca, Nuevo León. Members wear matching jumpsuits.

== History ==
Bronco was formed in 1979, in Apodaca, Nuevo Leon.

The first studio album recorded with Delgado was 1987's Bronco Super Bronco.

After the release and widespread success of A Todo Galope and the midst of the creation and distribution of Bronco Amigo, Bronco were acclaimed as the most eminent group in their category in both Mexico and the United States.

In 1991, it was reported “Pilar de Cantina” and “Maldito Corazón”, from album Sergio el Bailador experienced vast commercial success of their own in Mexico and the United States.

The band announced their farewell tour in January 1997, with their first performance of this farewell planned for February 1997 in New York. Members affirmed there was no other reason than them having completed their cycle. In August 1997, they received the keys of the City of Dallas. For their final performance in Monterrey, band members considered Estadio de Béisbol Monterrey but ultimately decided to use the local exposition in July. A final concert in 21 December in the Estadio Azteca stadium in Mexico City, attended by almost 100,000 people, was held. The concert caused the stadium to reach full capacity.

By the end of 1997, Bronco had received 37 gold and 20 platinum records.

In 2003, the band members announced a return to the public in May 2003. The band had recorded "Estoy a Punto" as the lead single for their new album, Siempre Arriba, by that time.

In 2003, they lost the right to use the name Bronco, and in 2017, the band regained the right to use the name Bronco.

In February 2012, original member, keyboardist and accordionist Erick Garza was kidnapped for ransom and murdered in Monterrey, Nuevo León.

José Luis Villarreal ("Choche") died on September 30, 2012, at age 55, in Apodaca, Nuevo León, Mexico. He had suffered for his last few years with cirrhosis.

In 2019, Ramiro Delgado left the band. Delgado's son, Ramiro Delgado Jr. joined later that year. On January 5, 2021, Ramiro Delgado Jr. left the band.

A Spanish language TV series based on Esparza's book, Cicatrices de un Corazón Bronco, Bronco: La Serie, first aired.

Bronco has sold over 12 million records as of 2017.

On January 12, 2021, Arsenio Guajardo was presented as new keyboardist and accordionist for the band. Guajardo previously worked with Los Trotamundos and Los Humildes.

== Discography ==
=== As Bronco ===
- 1980 - Te quiero cada día más
- 1982 - Tu Prieto
- 1983 - Grande de Caderas
- 1984 - Bailando Jalao
- 1985 - Sergio el Bailador
- 1986 - Indomable
- 1987 - Bronco Super Bronco
- 1988 - Un Golpe Más
- 1989 - A Todo Galope
- 1990 - Bronco Amigo
- 1991 - Salvaje y Tierno
- 1992 - Por el Mundo
- 1993 - Pura Sangre
- 1994 - Rompiendo Barreras
- 1995 - Animal
- 1996 - Homenaje a los Grandes Grupos
- 1997 - La Última Huella
- 1998 - Hasta Siempre... Bronco El Último Concierto
- 2017 - Primera Fila
- 2019 - Por Más
- 2019 - Bronco: La Serie
- 2021 - Acústico en vivo

=== As El Gigante de America ===
- 2003 - Siempre Arriba
- 2004 - Crónica de Dos Grandes
- 2004 - Sin Riendas
- 2005 - Por Ti
- 2006 - Huella Digital
- 2007 - Más Broncos Que Nunca
- 2007 - Sin Fronteras...En Vivo
- 2009 - El Mundo No Se Detiene
- 2010 - De Sangre Norteña
- 2012 - Por Siempre Tuyo
- 2013 - Por Puro Gusto
- 2014 - En Vivo desde Monterrey
- 2015 - En Vivo desde Monterrey Vol. 2
- 2015 - Indestructible

== See also ==
- List of best-selling Latin music artists
