= Los Temerarios =

Mexican grupera band

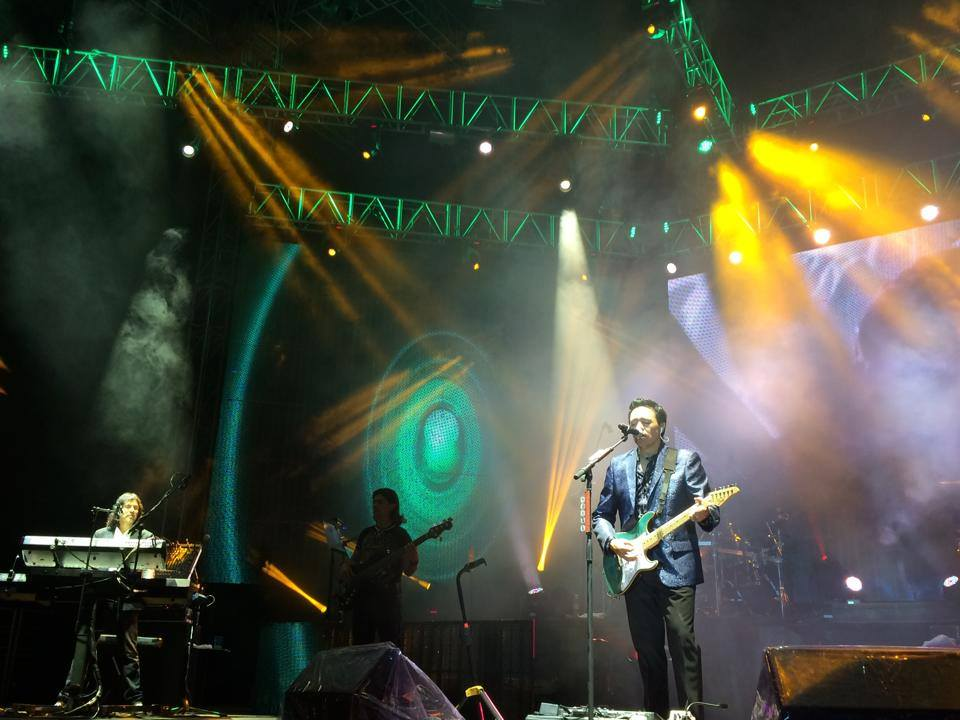
- Los Temerarios performing in Puebla, Mexico, in 2014

Background information
- Also known as: Conjunto La Brisa
- Origin: Fresnillo, Zacatecas, Mexico
- Genres: Grupero, Latin pop
- Years active: 1977-2024
- Labels: Sony Music Latin (1983–1987); Disa Records (1987–1994); AFG Sigma Records (1994–1995); Fonovisa (1995–2012); Virtus Inc. (2012–present)
- Past members: Adolfo Ángel; Gustavo Ángel; Fernando Ángel; Mario Alberto Ortíz; Carlos Abrego; Karlo Vidal; Jonathan Amabilis; Javier Alba Alba; Samuel Guzmán Magdaleno; Carlos Flores "Carlangas"; Jose Ramirez; Isidro Rios
- Website: www.lostemerarios.net

Los Temerarios were a Mexican grupera band formed in Fresnillo, Zacatecas in 1977 by brothers Adolfo Ángel and Gustavo Ángel and their cousin Fernando Ángel. During their early years, they were known as Conjunto La Brisa. Los Temerarios have recorded more than 20 studio albums and been honored with multiple music awards and nominations, including two Grammy nominations, one Latin Grammy Award, one Excellence Award from Premio Lo Nuestro and another Lifetime Achievement Award from the Latin Billboard Music Awards. In 2016, they were inducted into the Latin Songwriters Hall of Fame.

At the inaugural Latin Grammy Awards of 2000, they received the award for best Mexican-American album. In 2005, they received the Lifetime Achievement Award at the Premio Lo Nuestro 2005 Awards show. The aforementioned award has been given to only the maximum exponents in Latin music history. Similarly, in 2010, Los Temerarios received the Lifetime Achievement Award from 2010 Latin Billboard Music Awards held in Puerto Rico for their successful 30-year music career. In 2012, Los Temerarios received their star on the Las Vegas Walk of Fame.

On August 28, 2023, Los Temerarios announced their separation. Their farewell tour lasted through 2024, ending on December 21 at Estadio GNP Seguros (formally Foro Sol) in Mexico City.

== Discography ==
=== Albums ===
Title	Details	MEX	US Latin	US	Certications
Conjunto Las Brisas (as Conjunto Las Brisas)	Released in 1981 by CBS Mexico	—	—	—	
Conjunto Las Brisas 2 (as Conjunto Las Brisas)	Released in 1981 by CBS Mexico	—	—	—	
Los 14 Grandes exitos De Los Temerarios	Released in 1983 by CBS Mexico	—	—	—	
Los Temerarios En La Altura	Released in 1984 by CBS Mexico	—	—	—	
Cumbias Y Norteñas	Released in 1985 by CBS Mexico	—	—	—	
Pero No	Released on January 1, 1986 by Harmony	—	—	—	
Fue Un Juego	Released in 1987 by Disa	—	—	—	
Incontenibles	Released in 1988 by Disa	—	—	—	
Internacionales y Romanticos	Released in 1989 by Disa	—	—	—	
Te Quiero	Released on June 1, 1990 by Disa	—	—	—	RIAA: 3× Platinum (Latin)
Mi Vida Eres Tú	Released on June 1, 1992 by Disa	—	49	—	RIAA: 4× Platinum (Latin)
Tu Ultima Cancion	Released in October 1993 by Disa	—	5	—	RIAA: Diamond (Latin)
En Concierto Vol. 1	Released in 1994 by Fonovisa	—	37	—	
Camino del Amor	Released on 16 October 1995 by AFG Sigma Records	—	6	—	RIAA: 6× Platinum (Latin)
Pequeña	Released January 1, 1996 by AFG Sigma Records	—	—	—	
Nuestras Canciones	Released in 1996 by AFG Sigma Records	—	—	—	
Edicion de Oro	Released in 1996 by Musivisa	—	—	—	RIAA: Gold (Latin)
En Concierto Vol. 1	Released in 1996 by Fonovisa	—	—	—	RIAA: Platinum (Latin)
15 Súper Éxitos Volumen 1	Released in 1996 by Fonovisa	—	—	—	
Nuestras Canciones Vol. 2	Released in 1997 by Fonovisa	—	—	—	
En Concierto Vol. 2	Released in 1997 by Fonovisa	—	10	—	RIAA: 4× Platinum (Latin)
Como Te Recuerdo	Released in 1998 by Fonovisa Records & Virtus Inc	—	2	175	AMPROFON: Platinum+Gold; RIAA: Platinum
15 Exitos Para Siempre	Released in 1998 by Fonovisa Records & Virtus Inc	—	9	—	AMPROFON: Gold; RIAA: Platinum (Latin)
En La Madrugada se Fue	Released on February 29, 2000 by Fonovisa	—	1	75	AMPROFON: 2× Platinum; RIAA: Platinum
Baladas Rancheras	Released in 2001 by AFG SIGMA RECORDS	—	3	—	RIAA: 3× Platinum (Latin)
Joyas Vol. 1	Released in 2001 by Legend Recordings	—	13	—	RIAA: Platinum (Latin)
Poemas Canciones y Romance	Released in 2001 by AFG SIGMA RECORDS	—	—	—	
Una Lágrima No Basta	Released on June 25, 2002 by Fonovisa	—	1	79	AMPROFON: Platinum; RIAA: Gold
Joyas Vol. 2	Released in 2002 by Fonovisa	—	11	—	
Poemas Canciones y Romance, Vol. 2	Released in 2002 by Fonovisa	—	42	—	
Tributo al Amor	Released on November 25, 2003 by Fonovisa	—	1	179	AMPROFON: Gold
Veintisiete	Released on June 29, 2004 by Fonovisa	—	1	91	AMPROFON: Platinum+Gold; RIAA: Gold
Regalo de Amor	Released in 2004 by Fonovisa	—	2	114	AMPROFON: Gold; RIAA: Platinum (Latin)
Sueño de Amor	Released in 2005 by Fonovisa	—	3	111	RIAA: Platinum (Latin)
Los Super Exitos Con Mariachi	Released in 2006 by Disa	—	16	—	
Recuerdos del Alma	Released on October 2, 2007 by Fonovisa	41	1	59	AMPROFON: Gold; RIAA: Platinum (Latin)
Si Tú Te Vas	Released on July 8, 2008 Fonovisa	36	1	26	RIAA: 2× Platinum (Latin)
Evolucion de Amor	Released on January 27, 2009 by Fonovisa	—	2	133	RIAA: Gold (Latin)
Voz y Sentimiento: Sus Más Grandes Canciones de Amor	Released in 2010 byVirtus Inc	—	—	—	
Mi Vida Sin Ti	Released in 2012 by Virtus Inc	—	2	125	
20 Kilates	Released in 2012 by Virtus Inc	—	33	—	
30 Aniversario	Released in 2012 by Virtus Inc	—	2	—	
Iconos 25 Éxitos	Released in 2012 by Virtus Inc	—	14	—	
En Las Alturas	Released in 2013 by Virtus Inc	—	—	—	
Gran Encuentro	Released in 2014 by Universal	—	—	—	
Los Temerarios La Colección Completa	Released in 2015 by Universal	—	—	—	
Solo Hits (20 Éxitos)	Released in 2016 by Universal	—	41	—	
Sinfonico	Released on November 22, 2019 by Universal	—	—	—	
Los Temerarios Esencial	Released May 8, 2020 by Universal	—	—	—	
La Colección	Released in 2023 by Universal	—	—	—	

== See also ==
- List of best-selling Latin music artists
