= List of number-one debuts on Billboard Top Latin Albums =

Top Latin Albums is a record chart published by Billboard magazine and is labeled as the most important music chart for Spanish language, full-length albums in the American music market. Like all Billboard album charts, the chart is based on sales. Nielsen SoundScan compiles the sales data from merchants representing more than 90 percent of the U.S. music retail market. The sample includes sales at music stores, the music departments of electronics and department stores, direct-to-consumer transactions, and Internet sales of physical albums or digital downloads. A limited array of verifiable sales from concert venues is also tabulated.

To rank on this chart, an album must have 51% or more of its content recorded in Spanish. Before this chart, all Latin music information was featured on the Latin Pop Albums chart, which began on June 29, 1985, and is still running along with the Regional Mexican Albums and Tropical Albums chart. On the week ending February 11, 2017, Billboard updated the methodology to compile the Top Latin Albums chart into a multi-metric methodology to include track equivalent album units and streaming equivalent albums units.

As of January 2026, a total of 297 albums have achieved a number-one debut on the chart. Mi Tierra (1993) by Cuban singer Gloria Estefan was the first album to debut as number one on the chart. The first male artist to have a number-one debuting album on the chart is Spanish singer Julio Iglesias with Tango (1996), while the first due or group is Mexican-American rock band Santana with Supernatural (1999). Puerto Rican rapper Bad Bunny is the artist with the most number-one debuting albums, with all nine of his first consecutive works reaching number one on the chart on debut.

== Number-one debuts ==
Key
Studio album
Live album
Compilation, Greatest Hits or Remix album
EP
Soundtrack album

=== 1990s ===
Album	Artist	Genre(s)	Date	Ref.				
Album	Artist	Genre(s)	Date	Ref.	Mi Tierra	Gloria Estefan	Bolero	July 10, 1993
Dreaming of You	Selena	Latin pop; pop rock	August 5, 1995					
Siempre Selena	Selena	Tejano; latin pop	November 23, 1996					
Tango	Julio Iglesias	Latin pop; tango	December 7, 1996					
Vivir	Enrique Iglesias	Latin pop	February 15, 1997					
Llévame Contigo	Olga Tañón	Latin pop; salsa; merengue	May 17, 1997					
Contra La Corriente	Marc Anthony	Salsa; latin pop	November 22, 1997					
Vuelve	Ricky Martin	Latin pop	February 28, 1998					
Anthology	Selena	Tejano; latin pop	April 25, 1998					
Dance With Me	Various	Latin pop	August 29, 1998					
Cosas del Amor	Enrique Iglesias	Latin pop	October 10, 1998					
Te Acordarás de Mí	Olga Tañón	Latin pop; salsa; merengue	November 14, 1998					
Trozos de Mi Alma	Marco Antonio Solís	Ballad; latin pop	February 13, 1999					
Supernatural	Santana	Latin rock	July 3, 1999					
MTV Unplugged	Maná	Rock	July 10, 1999					
Amarte Es un Placer	Luis Miguel	Latin pop	October 2, 1999					

=== 2000s ===
Album	Artist	Genre(s)	Date	Ref.				
Album	Artist	Genre(s)	Date	Ref.	Morir de Amor	Conjunto Primavera	Norteño	February 12, 2000
En La Madrugada Se Fue	Los Temerarios	Ballad; latin pop	March 18, 2000					
Entre Tus Brazos	Alejandro Fernandez	Latin pop	May 13, 2000					
Alma Caribeña	Gloria Estefan	Latin pop	June 10, 2000					
Galería Caribe	Ricardo Arjona	Latin pop	September 16, 2000					
Mi Reflejo	Christina Aguilera	Latin pop; R&B	September 30, 2000					
Instinto y Deseo	Victor Manuelle	Salsa; latin pop	February 17, 2001					
La Historia	Ricky Martin	Latin pop	March 17, 2001					
Ansia de Amar	Conjunto Primavera	Norteño	April 14, 2001					
Más de Mi Alma	Marco Antonio Solís	Latin pop	June 16, 2001					
Homenaje a Chalino Sanchez	El Original de la Sierra	Norteño	July 7, 2001					
Cuando la Sangre Galopa	Jaguares	Rock	July 28, 2001					
Embrace the Chaos	Ozomatli	Latin rock; hip hop; funk	September 29, 2001					
En El Idioma del Amor	Grupo Bryndis	Ballad; cumbia	October 13, 2001					
Libre	Marc Anthony	Salsa	December 8, 2001					
Amor Secreto	Luis Fonsi	Latin pop; R&B	March 30, 2002					
Sueños	Intocable	Tejano	April 27, 2002					
Thalía	Thalía	Latin pop; pop rock	June 8, 2002					
Una Lágrima No Basta	Los Temerarios	Ballad; latin pop	July 13, 2002					
Revolución de Amor	Maná	Rock	September 7, 2002					
Quizás	Enrique Iglesias	Latin pop	October 5, 2002					
Grandes Éxitos	Shakira	Latin pop; dance pop; rock	November 23, 2002					
Mambo Sinuendo	Ry Cooder	Latin jazz	February 15, 2003					
La Historia	Intocable	Tejano	March 1, 2003					
4	Kumbia Kings	Cumbia; latin pop; hip hop	March 15, 2003					
Almas del Silencio	Ricky Martin	Latin pop; pop rock; dance pop	June 7, 2003					
Herencia Musical: 20 Corridos Inolvidables	Los Tigres del Norte	Norteño; cumbia; tejano	July 19, 2003					
Siempre Arriba	Grupo Bronco	Norteño; cumbia; tejano	August 9, 2003					
Nuestro Destino Estaba Escrito	Intocable	Tejano	September 6, 2003					
Sincero	Chayanne	Latin pop	September 13, 2003					
33	Luis Miguel	Latin pop	October 18, 2003					
La Historia	Kumbia Kings	Cumbia; latin pop	November 8, 2003					
Por Ti	Ednita Nazario	Latin pop	December 6, 2003					
Tributo al Amor	Los Temerarios	Ballad; latin pop	December 13, 2003					
Crónica de Dos Grandes	Grupo Bronco and Los Bukis	Grupera; cumbia; norteño	February 21, 2004					
Pau-Latina	Paulina Rubio	Latin pop	February 28, 2004					
Íntimamente: En Vivo	Intocable	Tejano	March 13, 2004					
En Vivo Desde Chicago	Grupo Montez de Durango	Duranguense	April 10, 2004					
Pacto de Sangre	Los Tigres del Norte	Norteño; cumbia	April 17, 2004					
Seducción	Jennifer Peña	Latin pop	June 5, 2004					
Con Mis Propias Manos	Lupillo Rivera	Norteño	June 12, 2004					
Amar Sin Mentiras	Marc Anthony	Latin pop; pop rock	June 26, 2004					
Veintisiete	Los Temerarios	Norteño; mariachi; latin pop	July 17, 2004					
Barrio Fino	Daddy Yankee	Reggaeton; hip hop	July 31, 2004					
Valió la Pena	Marc Anthony	Salsa	August 14, 2004					
Sin Riendas	Grupo Bronco	Norteño; mariachi; cumbia	August 21, 2004					
Mi Sangre	Juanes	Latin rock; alternative rock	October 16, 2004					
Razón de Sobra	Marco Antonio Solís	Latin pop	November 20, 2004					
México en la Piel	Luis Miguel	Mariachi	November 27, 2004					
Y Sigue La Mata Dando	Grupo Montez de Durango	Duranguense	February 19, 2005					
Fijación Oral, Vol. 1	Shakira	Latin pop	June 25, 2005					
Cautivo	Chayanne	Latin pop	October 15, 2005					
Más Capaces Que Nunca	K-Paz de la Sierra	Duranguense	October 22, 2005					
Pa'l Mundo	Wisin & Yandel	Reggaeton	November 26, 2005					
Reggaetón Latino	Don Omar	Reggaeton	December 24, 2005					
Barrio Fino En Directo	Daddy Yankee	Reggaeton; hip hop	December 31, 2005					
Now Latino	Various	Latin pop; reggaeton	April 8, 2006					
Borrón y Cuenta Nueva	Grupo Montez de Durango	Duranguense	May 20, 2006					
Los Rompe Discotekas	Héctor el Father	Reggaeton	July 15, 2006					
Amar Es Combatir	Maná	Latin rock; pop rock	September 9, 2006					
Ananda	Paulina Rubio	Latin pop	October 7, 2006					
Más Flow: Los Benjamins	Luny Tunes and Tainy	Reggaeton	October 14, 2006					
Crossroads: Cruce de Caminos	Intocable	Latin pop; norteño; tejano	November 11, 2006					
MTV Unplugged	Ricky Martin	Latin pop; pop rock	November 25, 2006					
Navidades	Luis Miguel	Latin pop; jazz; swing	December 2, 2006					
Celestial	RBD	Pop rock; dance pop	December 9, 2006					
Recio, Recio Mis Creadorez	Los Creadorez del Pasito Duranguense	Norteño; ranchera; polka	February 17, 2007					
La Historia Continúa... Parte III	Marco Antonio Solís	Latin pop	March 17, 2007					
La Llave de Mi Corazón	Juan Luis Guerra	Merengue; salsa; bachata	April 7, 2007					
Como Ama Una Mujer	Jennifer Lopez	Latin pop; R&B	April 14, 2007					
Residente o Visitante	Calle 13	Alternative hip hop	May 12, 2007					
Ahora y Siempre	Alacranes Musical	Norteño; ranchera; duranguense	June 9, 2007					
El Cartel: The Big Boss	Daddy Yankee	Reggaeton; hip hop	June 23, 2007					
Agárrese	Grupo Montez de Durango	Duranguense	July 21, 2007					
El Cantante	Marc Anthony	Salsa	August 11, 2007					
La Radiolina	Manu Chao	Worldbeat; reggae; rock	September 22, 2007					
90 Millas	Gloria Estefan	Latin pop; latin rock; salsa	October 6, 2007					
Recuerdos del Alma	Los Temerarios	Norteño; mariachi; latin pop	October 20, 2007					
La Vida... Es Un Ratico	Juanes	Latin rock	November 10, 2007					
Empezar Desde Cero	RBD	Dance pop; pop rock	December 8, 2007					
Real	Ednita Nazario	Latin pop; pop rock; latin rock	December 29, 2007					
Qué Ganas de Volver	Conjunto Primavera	Norteño; mariachi; cumbia	February 23, 2008					
En Vivo: Desde el Auditorio Nacional	K-Paz de la Sierra	Norteño; mariachi; duranguense	March 8, 2008					
Raíces	Los Tigres del Norte	Norteño; corrido	March 22, 2008					
95/08	Enrique Iglesias	Latin pop; R&B	April 12, 2008					
Arde El Cielo	Maná	Latin pop; rock	May 17, 2008					
Cómplices	Luis Miguel	Latin pop	May 24, 2008					
Si Tú Te Vas	Los Temerarios	Latin pop	July 26, 2008					
Talento de Barrio	Daddy Yankee	Reggaeton; hip hop	August 30, 2008					
Palabras del Silencio	Luis Fonsi	Latin pop	September 13, 2008					
Jenni	Jenni Rivera	Banda; latin pop	September 27, 2008					
No Molestar	Marco Antonio Solís	Latin pop	October 25, 2008					
La Mente Maestra	Nesty and Wisin & Yandel	Reggaeton; electropop	November 29, 2008					
5to Piso	Ricardo Arjona	Latin pop	December 6, 2008					
Primera Fila	Vicente Fernandez	Mariachi	December 20, 2008					
Necesito Más de Ti	Duelo	Norteño	February 14, 2009					
Quiéreme Más	Patrulla 81	Norteño; duranguense	March 7, 2009					
Sin Frenos	La Quinta Estación	Latin pop	April 4, 2009					
Más Adelante	La Arrolladora Banda El Limón	Banda	April 11, 2009					
iDon	Don Omar	Reggaeton; hip hop; electropop	May 16, 2009					
Yo No Canto, Pero Lo Intentamos	Espinoza Paz	Latin pop; banda; norteño	June 6, 2009					
La Revolución	Wisin & Yandel	Reggaeton; electropop	June 13, 2009					
The Last	Aventura	Bachata; latin pop	June 27, 2009					
La Granja	Los Tigres del Norte	Norteño	September 26, 2009					
Mi Plan	Nelly Furtado	Latin pop; R&B	October 3, 2009					
Sin Mirar Atrás	David Bisbal	Latin pop; pop rock	November 7, 2009					
Soy	Ednita Nazario	Latin pop	November 14, 2009					
Paraíso Express	Alejandro Sanz	Latin rock	November 28, 2009					

=== 2010s ===
Album	Artist	Genre(s)	Date	Ref.				
Album	Artist	Genre(s)	Date	Ref.	¡Ando Bien Pedo!	Banda Los Recoditos	Banda	February 6, 2010
Dejarte de Amar	Camila	Latin pop; pop rock	February 27, 2010					
No Hay Imposibles	Chayanne	Latin pop	March 13, 2010					
San Patricio	The Chieftains and Ry Cooder	Celtic fusion; norteño; ranchera	March 27, 2010					
Solamente Tú	Duelo	Norteño; latin pop	April 24, 2010					
Mundial	Daddy Yankee	Reggaeton; latin pop	May 15, 2010					
Íconos	Marc Anthony	Latin pop	June 12, 2010					
Euphoria	Enrique Iglesias	Latin pop; electropop	July 24, 2010					
Poquita Ropa	Ricardo Arjona	Latin pop	September 11, 2010					
Luis Miguel	Luis Miguel	Latin pop	October 2, 2010					
El Hombre Que Más Te Amó	Vicente Fernandez	Mariachi; ranchera; latin pop	October 23, 2010					
En Total Plenitud	Marco Antonio Solís	Latin pop	October 30, 2010					
Sale El Sol	Shakira	Latin pop; merengue; rock	November 6, 2010					
Los Vaqueros: El Regreso	Wisin & Yandel	Reggaeton; electropop	February 12, 2011					
Música + Alma + Sexo	Ricky Martin	Latin pop; pop rock	February 19, 2011					
Gloria	Gloria Trevi	Latin pop; electropop; dance pop	April 9, 2011					
Morir y Existir: En Vivo	Gerardo Ortíz	Norteño	April 16, 2011					
Drama y Luz	Maná	Latin rock; pop rock	April 30, 2011					
Un Nuevo Día	Jencarlos Canela	Latin pop	July 9, 2011					
Tierra Firme	Luis Fonsi	Latin pop	July 16, 2011					
Entre Dios y El Diablo	Gerardo Ortíz	Norteño	September 24, 2011					
Canciones Que Duelen	Espinoza Paz	Norteño; latin pop	October 15, 2011					
Independiente	Ricardo Arjona	Latin pop; rock	October 22, 2011					
Supremo	Chino & Nacho	Latin pop; merengue; bachata	November 5, 2011					
Mi Amigo El Príncipe	Cristian Castro	Latin pop	November 19, 2011					
Formula, Vol. 1	Romeo Santos	Bachata; latin pop; R&B	November 26, 2011					
Irreversible...2012	La Arrolladora Banda El Limón	Banda	February 11, 2012					
Desnuda	Ednita Nazario	Latin pop; pop rock	April 14, 2012					
Enamorada de Ti	Selena	Latin pop; pop rock	April 21, 2012					
Phase II	Prince Royce	Latin pop; bachata; R&B	April 28, 2012					
Meet The Orphans: New Generation	Don Omar	Latin pop; reggaeton	May 19, 2012					
MTV Unplugged	Juanes	Latin pop; pop rock	June 16, 2012					
Una Noche de Luna	Marco Antonio Solis	Latin pop	July 14, 2012					
Líderes	Wisin & Yandel	Electropop; latin pop; reggaeton	July 21, 2012					
El Muchacho	Roberto Tapia	Norteño	August 11, 2012					
La Fórmula	Various	Reggaeton; latin pop	September 8, 2012					
Exiliados en la Bahía: Lo Mejor de Maná	Maná	Pop rock; alternative rock	September 15, 2012					
Prestige	Daddy Yankee	Reggaeton; hip hop; latin pop	September 29, 2012					
La Música No Se Toca	Alejandro Sanz	Latin pop; pop rock	October 13, 2012					
12 Historias	Tommy Torres	Latin pop	October 20, 2012					
Entrégate	Tierra Cali	Norteño	November 17, 2012					
The King Stays King: Sold Out at Madison Square Garden	Romeo Santos	Bachata; R&B	November 24, 2012					
Habítame Siempre	Thalía	Latin pop; pop rock	December 8, 2012					
La Misma Gran Señora	Jenni Rivera	Banda; ranchera	December 29, 2012					
Passione	Andrea Bocelli	Traditional pop; latin pop	February 16, 2013					
Tu Amigo Nada Más	Julión Álvarez y su Norteño Banda	Banda	March 30, 2013					
Vida	Draco Rosa	Latin rock; latin pop	April 6, 2013					
Sold Out: En Vivo Desde El Nokia Theatre L.A. Live	Gerardo Ortíz	Norteño	April 13, 2013					
En Peligro de Extinción	Intocable	Norteño; tejano	April 20, 2013					
Corazón Profundo	Carlos Vives	Vallenato; champeta; cumbia	May 11, 2013					
Libre Por Naturaleza	Duelo	Norteño	May 25, 2013					
A Son de Guerra Tour	Juan Luis Guerra	Merengue; bachata	June 1, 2013					
Natalie Cole en Español	Natalie Cole	Latin pop	July 14, 2013					
Lo Mejor de Roberto Tapia	Roberto Tapia	Norteño	August 3, 2013					
Confidencias	Alejandro Fernandez	Latin pop	September 14, 2013					
Soy El Mismo	Prince Royce	Latin pop; bachata	October 26, 2013					
Gracias Por Estar Aquí	Marco Antonio Solís	Latin pop	November 9, 2013					
De Líder a Leyenda	Yandel	Reggaeton; latin pop; electropop	November 23, 2013					
Sentimiento, Elegancia & Maldad	Arcángel	Reggaeton; hip hop	December 7, 2013					
Archivos De Mi Vida	Gerardo Ortíz	Norteño	December 14, 2013					
1969 - Siempre, En Vivo Desde Monterrey, Parte 1	Jenni Rivera	Latin pop	December 21, 2013					
Las Bandas Románticas de América 2014	Various	Banda	February 8, 2014					
Formula, Vol. 2	Romeo Santos	Bachata; latin pop; R&B	March 15, 2014					
Sex and Love	Enrique Iglesias	Latin pop; electropop	April 5, 2014					
Viaje	Ricardo Arjona	Latin pop	May 17, 2014					
Corazón	Santana	Latin rock	May 24, 2014					
De Alumno A Maestro	Remmy Valenzuela	Norteño	July 12, 2014					
1969 - Siempre, En Vivo Desde Monterrey, Parte 2	Jenni Rivera	Latin pop	July 19, 2014					
El Fenómeno	La Maquinaria Norteña	Norteño	October 11, 2014					
Quiero Ser Tu Dueño	Luis Coronel	Latin pop; norteño	October 18, 2014					
Los Menores	Farruko	Reggaeton; hip hop	November 15, 2014					
Todo Tiene Su Hora	Juan Luis Guerra	Latin pop	November 29, 2014					
Amore Mío	Thalía	Latin pop; dance pop	December 6, 2014					
1 Vida, 3 Historias: Despedida de Culiacán	Jenni Rivera	Latin pop; banda; mariachi	December 20, 2014					
Confidencias Reales	Alejandro Fernandez	Latin pop	December 27, 2014					
Las Bandas Románticas de América 2015	Various	Banda	February 7, 2015					
XX: 20 Aniversario	Intocable	Norteño; tejano	February 14, 2015					
Ojos En Blanco	La Arrolladora Banda El Limón	Banda	February 21, 2015					
A Quien Quiera Escuchar	Ricky Martin	Latin pop	February 28, 2015					
Aferrado	Julión Álvarez y su Norteño Banda	Banda	April 11, 2015					
La Melodía De La Calle: 3rd Season	Tony Dize	Reggaeton; latin pop	April 25, 2015					
Cama Incendiada	Maná	Pop rock	May 9, 2015					
Sirope	Alejandro Sanz	Latin pop	May 23, 2015					
Hoy Más Fuerte	Gerardo Ortíz	Norteño	June 6, 2015					
Ahora	Chiquis Rivera	Banda; latin pop	June 20, 2015					
The Last Don II	Don Omar	Reggaeton; hip hop	July 4, 2015					
Mi Vicio Más Grande	Banda El Recodo	Banda	July 18, 2015					
Dale	Pitbull	Latin pop; reggaeton	August 8, 2015					
Más + Corazón Profundo Tour: En Vivo	Carlos Vives	Vallenato; champeta; cumbia	August 29, 2015					
El Amor	Gloria Trevi	Latin pop; pop rock	September 12, 2015					
En Vivo: Guadalajara - Monterrey	Banda Sinaloense MS	Banda	September 19, 2015					
Los Vaqueros: La Trilogía	Wisin	Reggaeton; latin pop	September 26, 2015					
Ya Dime Adiós	La Maquinaria Norteña	Norteño	October 17, 2015					
Muriendo de Amor	Vicente Fernandez	Mariachi; latin pop	October 31, 2015					
Visionary	Farruko	Reggaeton; latin pop	November 14, 2015					
Pretty Boy, Dirty Boy	Maluma	Reggaeton; latin pop	November 21, 2015					
Dangerous	Yandel	Reggaeton; latin pop; electropop	November 28, 2015					
Amor & Pasión	Il Divo	Classical crossover; bolero; mambo	December 5, 2015					
Historias De La Calle	Calibre 50	Norteño	December 12, 2015					
Un Besito Más	Jesse & Joy	Latin rock; latin pop; pop rock	December 26, 2015					
Los Dúo, Vol. 2	Juan Gabriel	Traditional pop; latin pop	January 2, 2016					
Me Está Gustando	Banda Los Recoditos	Banda	February 20, 2016					
Qué Bendición	Banda Sinaloense MS	Banda	February 27, 2016					
Una Última Vez	Sin Bandera	Latin pop	March 12, 2016					
Recuerden Mi Estilo	Los Plebes del Rancho	Sierreño; corrido	March 26, 2016					
Mis Ídolos, Hoy Mis Amigos!!!	Julión Álvarez y su Norteño Banda	Banda	April 30, 2016					
A Todo Volumen	La Séptima Banda	Banda	May 7, 2016					
Visualízate	Gente de Zona	Latin pop	May 14, 2016					
Pégate De Mi Mambo	Manny Manuel	Merengue; bolero	May 21, 2016					
Latina	Thalía	Latin pop; dance pop; pop rock	May 28, 2016					
Limonada	Kany García	Latin pop; folk	June 11, 2016					
Libre Otra Vez	La Arrolladora Banda El Limón	Banda	June 25, 2016					
Inmortal	Gloria Trevi	Latin pop	July 2, 2016					
Highway	Intocable	Norteño; tejano	July 9, 2016					
Energía	J Balvin	Reggaeton; trap	July 16, 2016					
Des/Amor	Reik	Latin pop; pop rock	July 30, 2016					
Yo Te Esperaré	Siggno	Tejano	August 6, 2016					
Generación Maquinaria Est. 2006	La Maquinaria Norteña	Norteño	August 20, 2016					
Vestido de Etiqueta por Eduardo Magallanes	Juan Gabriel	Latin pop	September 3, 2016					
Primera Cita	CNCO	Latin pop	September 17, 2016					
Motivan2	Zion & Lennox	Reggaeton; latin pop	October 22, 2016					
Paloma Negra Desde Monterrey	Jenni Rivera	Banda; ranchera	November 19, 2016					
Fenix	Nicky Jam	Reggaeton; latin pop	February 11, 2017					
Five	Prince Royce	Bachata; latin pop; R&B	March 18, 2017					
Dance Latin #1 Hits 2.0	Various	Reggaeton; trap; dance pop	April 22, 2017					
Mis Planes Son Amarte	Juanes	Latin pop	June 3, 2017					
Summer Latin Hits 2017	Various	Latin pop; reggaeton	June 17, 2017					
Versus	Gloria Trevi and Alejandra Guzman	Latin pop	July 22, 2017					
Golden	Romeo Santos	Bachata; latin pop	August 12, 2017					
Odisea	Ozuna	Reggaeton	September 16, 2017					
CNCO	CNCO	Latin pop	April 21, 2018					
F.A.M.E	Maluma	Latin pop	June 2, 2018					
Vibras	J Balvin	Reggaeton; Latin pop	June 9, 2018					
Real Hasta la Muerte	Anuel AA	Latin trap; reggaeton	July 28, 2018					
Aura	Ozuna	Reggaeton	September 8, 2018					
X 100pre	Bad Bunny	Reggaeton	January 5, 2019					
Utopía	Romeo Santos	Bachata	April 17, 2019					
Oasis	Bad Bunny and J Balvin	Reggaeton	July 13, 2019					
Africa Speaks	Santana	Latin rock	June 22, 2019					
Nibiru	Ozuna	Reggaeton	December 14, 2019					

=== 2020s ===
Album	Artist	Genre(s)	Date	Ref.				
Album	Artist	Genre(s)	Date	Ref.	Easy Money Baby	Mike Towers	Reggaeton	February 8, 2020
Alter Ego	Prince Royce	Bachata	February 22, 2020					
Hecho en México	Alejandro Fernández	Ranchero	February 29, 2020					
YHLQMDLG	Bad Bunny	Reggaeton	March 14, 2020					
Las Que No Iban A Salir	Bad Bunny	Reggaeton	May 23, 2020					
Emmanuel	Anuel AA	Reggaeton	July 13, 2020					
Vibras de Noche	Eslabon Armado	Regional Mexican	August 1, 2020					
ENOC	Ozuna	Reggaeton	September 19, 2020					
El Último Tour del Mundo	Bad Bunny	Reggaeton	December 12, 2020					
Los Dioses	Anuel AA and Ozuna	Reggaeton	February 6, 2021					
Revelación	Selena Gomez	Latin pop	March 27, 2021					
KG0516	Karol G	Reggaeton	April 10, 2021					
Vice Versa	Rauw Alejandro	Reggaeton	July 10, 2021					
Jose	J Balvin	Reggaeton	September 25, 2021					
La 167	Farruko	Reggaeton	October 16, 2021					
Las Leyendas Nunca Mueren	Anuel AA	Reggaeton	December 11, 2021					
Anniversary Trilogy	Bad Bunny	Reggaeton	January 15, 2022					
Legendaddy	Daddy Yankee	Reggaeton	April 9, 2022					
Un Verano Sin Ti	Bad Bunny	Reggaeton	May 21, 2022					
Mañana Será Bonito	Karol G	Reggaeton	March 11, 2023					
Desvelado	Eslabón Armado	Regional Mexican	May 13, 2023					
Génesis	Peso Pluma	Reggaeton	July 8, 2023					
Mañana Será Bonito (Bichota Season)	Karol G	Reggaeton	August 23, 2023					
Nadie Sabe Lo Que Va a Pasar Mañana	Bad Bunny	Reggaeton	October 28, 2023					
Orquídias	Kali Uchis	Reggaeton	January 27, 2024					
Las Mujeres Ya No Lloran	Shakira	Latin pop	April 6, 2024					
Mirada	Iván Cornejo	Regional Mexican	August 3, 2024					
Éxodo	Peso Pluma	Reggaeton	August 10, 2024					
Cosa Nuestra	Rauw Alejandro	Reggaeton	November 30, 2024					
Debí Tirar Más Fotos	Bad Bunny	Reggaeton	January 18, 2025					
Tropicoqueta	Karol G	Latin pop	July 5, 2025					
Lux	Rosalia	Pop	November 22, 2025					

== Artist records ==
=== Artists with most number-one debuts ===
Artist	Number-one debuts	Albums
Bad Bunny	9	X 100pre (2019); Oasis with J Balvin (2019); YHLQMDLG (2020); Las Que No Iban A Salir (2020); El Último Tour del Mundo (2020); Anniversary Trilogy (2022); Un Verano Sin Ti (2022); Nadia Sabe Lo Que Va A Pasar Mañana (2023); Debí Tirar Más Fotos (2025)
Marco Antonio Solís	8	Trozos de Mi Alma (1999); Más de Mi Alma (2001); Razón de Sobra (2004); La Historia Continúa... Parte III (2007); No Molestar (2008); En Total Plenitud (2010); Una Noche de Luna (2012); Gracias Por Estar Aquí (2013)
Intocable	8	Sueños (2002); La Historia (2003); Nuestro Destino Estaba Escrito (2003); Íntimamente: En Vivo (2004); Crossroads: Cruce de Caminos (2006); En Peligro de Extinción (2013); XX: 20 Aniversario (2015); Highway (2016)
Maná	7	MTV Unplugged (1999); Revolución de Amor (2002); Amar Es Combatir (2006); Arde El Cielo (2008); Drama y Luz (2011); Exiliados en la Bahía: Lo Mejor de Maná (2012); Cama Incendiada (2015)
Enrique Iglesias	6	Vivir (1997); Cosas del Amor (1998); Quizás (2002); 95/08 (2008); Euphoria (2010); Sex and Love (2014)
Marc Anthony	6	Contra La Corriente (1997); Libre (2001); Amar Sin Mentiras (2004); Valió la Pena (2004); El Cantante (2007); Íconos (2010)
Ricky Martin	6	Vuelve (1998); La Historia (2001); Almas del Silencio (2003); MTV Unplugged (2006); Música + Alma + Sexo (2011); A Quien Quiera Escuchar (2015)
Daddy Yankee	6	Barrio Fino (2004); Barrio Fino En Directo (2005); El Cartel: The Big Boss (2007); Talento de Barrio (2008); Mundial (2010); Prestige (2012)
Jenni Rivera	6	Jenni (2008); La Misma Gran Señora (2012); 1969 - Siempre, En Vivo Desde Monterrey, Parte 1 (2013); 1969 - Siempre, En Vivo Desde Monterrey, Parte 2 (2014); 1 Vida – 3 Historias: Metamorfosis – Despedida de Culiacán – Jenni Vive 2013 (2014); Paloma Negra Desde Monterrey (2016)

== See also ==
- List of number-one Billboard Top Latin Albums from the 1990s
- List of number-one Billboard Top Latin Albums of 2000
- List of number-one Billboard Top Latin Albums of 2001
- List of number-one Billboard Top Latin Albums of 2002
- List of number-one Billboard Top Latin Albums of 2003
- List of number-one Billboard Top Latin Albums of 2004
- List of number-one Billboard Top Latin Albums of 2005
- List of number-one Billboard Top Latin Albums of 2006
- List of number-one Billboard Top Latin Albums of 2007
- List of number-one Billboard Top Latin Albums of 2008
- List of number-one Billboard Top Latin Albums of 2009
- List of number-one Billboard Latin Albums from the 2010s
- List of number-one Billboard Latin Albums from the 2020s
