= List of number-one Billboard Regional Mexican Songs of 2007 =

The Billboard Regional Mexican Songs chart ranks the best-performing Regional Mexican singles in the United States. Published weekly by Billboard magazine, it ranks the "most popular regional Mexican songs, ranked by radio airplay audience impressions as measured by Nielsen Music."

== Chart history ==
The yellow background indicates the best-performing song of 2007.

Issue date	Song	Artist(s)	Ref.
January 6	"Dime quién es"	Los Rieleros del Norte	
January 13	"Dime quién es"	Los Rieleros del Norte	
January 20	"Dime quién es"	Los Rieleros del Norte	
January 27	"Dime quién es"	Los Rieleros del Norte	
February 3	"Dime quién es"	Los Rieleros del Norte	
February 10	"Dime quién es"	Los Rieleros del Norte	
February 17	"Ese"	Conjunto Primavera	
February 24	"Ese"	Conjunto Primavera	
March 3	"Ese"	Conjunto Primavera	
March 10	"Ese"	Conjunto Primavera	
March 17	"Cada vez que pienso en ti"	Los Creadorez del Pasito Duranguense de Alfredo Ramírez	
March 24	"La noche perfecta"	El Chapo de Sinaloa	
March 31	"Un idiota como yo"	Duelo	
April 7	"Detalles"	Los Tigres del Norte	
April 14	"Detalles"	Los Tigres del Norte	
April 21	"Ese"	Conjunto Primavera	
April 28	"Detalles"	Los Tigres del Norte	
May 5	"Es cosa de él"	Graciela Beltrán	
May 12	"Detalles"	Los Tigres del Norte	
May 19	"Dame un besito"	Intocable	
May 26	"Dame un besito"	Intocable	
June 2	"Mil heridas"	Banda Cuisillos	
June 9	"Mil heridas"	Banda Cuisillos	
June 16	"De ti exclusivo"	La Arrolladora Banda El Limón de René Camacho	
June 23	"De ti exclusivo"	La Arrolladora Banda El Limón de René Camacho	
June 30	"Mil heridas"	Banda Cuisillos	
July 7	"Por amarte así"	Alacranes Musical	
July 14	"A ti sí puedo decirte"	El Chapo de Sinaloa	
July 21	"De ti exclusivo"	La Arrolladora Banda El Limón de René Camacho	
July 28	"Por amarte así"	Alacranes Musical	
August 4	"De ti exclusivo"	La Arrolladora Banda El Limón de René Camacho	
August 11	"Olvídame tú"	Duelo	
August 18	"De ti exclusivo"	La Arrolladora Banda El Limón de René Camacho	
August 25	"¡Basta ya!"	Conjunto Primavera	
September 1	"Lágrimas del corazón"	Grupo Montez de Durango	
September 8	"De ti exclusivo"	La Arrolladora Banda El Limón de René Camacho	
September 15	"Un juego"	Los Rieleros del Norte	
September 22	"De ti exclusivo"	La Arrolladora Banda El Limón de René Camacho	
September 29	"De ti exclusivo"	La Arrolladora Banda El Limón de René Camacho	
October 6	"A ti sí puedo decirte"	El Chapo de Sinaloa	
October 13	"Estos celos"	Vicente Fernández	
October 20	"Bastó"	Intocable	
October 27	"Estos celos"	Vicente Fernández	
November 3	"Estos celos"	Vicente Fernández	
November 10	"Estos celos"	Vicente Fernández	
November 17	"Estos celos"	Vicente Fernández	
November 24	"Volé muy alto"	Los Huracanes del Norte	
December 1	"Estos celos"	Vicente Fernández	
December 8	"Estos celos"	Vicente Fernández	
December 15	"Sin que lo sepas tú"	Los Temerarios	
December 22	"Estos celos"	Vicente Fernández	
December 29	"Estos celos"	Vicente Fernández	
