= List of number-one Billboard Regional Mexican Songs of 2022 =

The Billboard Regional Mexican Songs is a subchart of the Latin Airplay chart that ranks the best-performing songs on Regional Mexican radio stations in the United States. Published weekly by Billboard magazine, it ranks the "most popular regional Mexican songs, ranked by radio airplay audience impressions as measured by Nielsen Music."

== Chart history ==
Issue date	Song	Artist(s)	Ref.
January 1	"Ya Solo Eres Mi Ex"	La Addictiva	
January 8	"Ya Solo Eres Mi Ex"	La Addictiva	
January 15	"Ya Solo Eres Mi Ex"	La Addictiva	
January 22	"Si Te Pudiera Mentir"	Calibre 50	
January 29	"Si Te Pudiera Mentir"	Calibre 50	
February 5	"Cada Quien"	Grupo Firme & Maluma	
February 12	"Cada Quien"	Grupo Firme & Maluma	
February 19	"Esta Vida Es Muy Bonita"	Banda El Recodo de Cruz Lizarraga	
February 26	"Esta Vida Es Muy Bonita"	Banda El Recodo de Cruz Lizarraga	
March 5	"Ojos Cerrados"	Banda MS featuring Carin León	
March 12	"Ojos Cerrados"	Banda MS featuring Carin León	
March 19	"Ojos Cerrados"	Banda MS featuring Carin León	
March 26	"En Donde Estabas?"	Los Tigres del Norte	
April 2	"En Donde Estabas?"	Los Tigres del Norte	
April 9	"No"	Alfredo Olivas	
April 16	"Me Vale Perderte"	Banda Rancho Viejo de Julio Aramburo	
April 23	"Me Siento A Todo Dar"	Banda Los Recoditos	
April 30	"Modo Incognito"	Banda Los Sebastianes de Saul Plata	
May 7	"Ahi Donde Me Ven"	Ángela Aguilar	
May 14	"Hibrido"	Virlan Garcia	
May 21	"Chale!"	Edén Muñoz	
May 28	"Chale!"	Edén Muñoz	
June 4	"Chale!"	Edén Muñoz	
June 11	"Brindo"	Mario Bautista and Banda El Recodo	
June 18	"Miranos Ahora"	Calibre 50	
June 25	"Miranos Ahora"	Calibre 50	
July 2	"Hay Que Hacer Dinero"	Banda MS and Edén Muñoz	
July 9	"Hay Que Hacer Dinero"	Banda MS and Edén Muñoz	
July 16	"Si Me Duele Que Duela"	Intocable	
July 23	"Si Me Duele Que Duela"	Intocable	
July 30	"Vivo En El 6"	Christian Nodal	
August 6	"Vivo En El 6"	Christian Nodal	
August 13	"Vivo En El 6"	Christian Nodal	
August 20	"50 y Cincuenta"	La Maquinaria Norteña	
August 27	"La Luna de Miel"	La Fiera de Ojinaga	
September 3	"El Reemplazo"	Grupo Firme and Banda El Recodo de Cruz Lizarraga	
September 10	"JGL"	La Addictiva and Luis R. Conriquez	
September 17	"Nunca Dudes En Llamarme"	La Arrolladora Banda el Limon de Rene Camacho and Alejandro Fernandez	
September 24	"Cuentame"	Los Rieleros del Norte	
October 1	"Soldado Caido"	El Fantasma	
October 8	"Modo Crudo"	Gerardo Ortíz	
October 15	"Fuerte No Soy"	Banda Los Recoditos	
October 22	"Calidad"	Grupo Firme and Luis Mexia	
October 29	"24 Siete"	Duelo	
November 5	"24 Siete"	Duelo	
November 12	"Alaska"	Camilo and Grupo Firme	
November 19	"Si Ya Hiciste El Mal"	Luis R. Conriquez and Jessi Uribe	
November 26	"Que Te Vaya Bien"	Julión Álvarez y Su Norteno Banda	
December 3	"Que Te Vaya Bien"	Julión Álvarez y Su Norteno Banda	
December 10	"Que Te Vaya Bien"	Julión Álvarez y Su Norteno Banda	
December 17	"Que Te Vaya Bien"	Julión Álvarez y Su Norteno Banda	
December 24	"Que Te Vaya Bien"	Julión Álvarez y Su Norteno Banda	
December 31	"Que Te Vaya Bien"	Julión Álvarez y Su Norteno Banda	
