= List of number-one Billboard Top Latin Albums of 2006 =

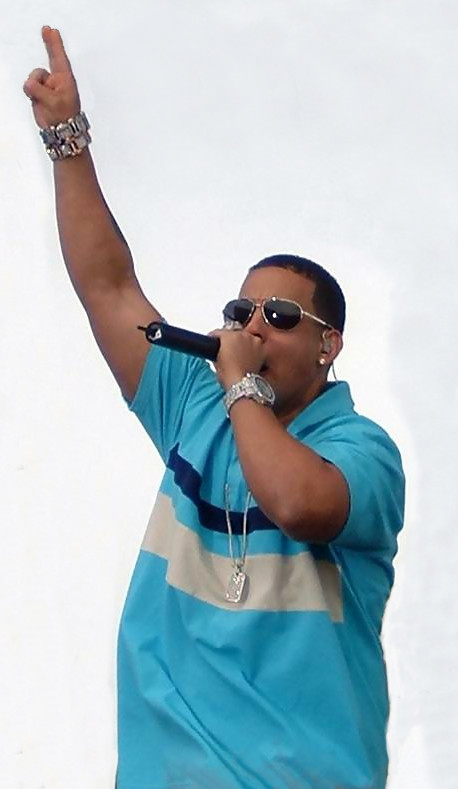
In 2006, Daddy Yankee spent 13 weeks at number one.

The Billboard Top Latin albums chart, published in Billboard magazine, is a record chart that features Latin music sales information. This data are compiled by Nielsen SoundScan from a sample that includes music stores, music departments at electronics and department stores, Internet sales (both physical and digital) and verifiable sales from concert venues in the United States.

There were thirteen number-one albums on this chart in 2006. The best-selling Latin album was Barrio Fino en Directo by Daddy Yankee. This album debuted at number 24 in the Billboard 200 in the last week of 2005; it spent 13 weeks at the top of the chart, more than any other number-one albums in the chart. Now Latino also peaked at number one, spending seven non-consecutive weeks at this position; this compilation album includes music by Aventura, Don Omar, Juanes, La 5ª Estación, Kumbia Kings, Chayanne, Wisin & Yandel, Bebe, Ricardo Arjona, Luis Fonsi, Thalía, Alexis & Fido, Zion & Lennox, Angel & Khriz, Cristian Castro, Reik, Sin Bandera and Alejandro Fernández.

MTV Unplugged by Ricky Martin spent one week at the top of the chart on November 22, 2006, and won the Latin Grammy Award for Best Male Pop Vocal Album; this album was replaced at number one by Navidades by Luis Miguel, an album that received a Grammy Award nomination for Best Latin Pop Vocal Album. With the highest charting debut by a reggaeton artist, Don Omar's King of Kings entered at number seven on the Billboard 200 with 68,000 units sold. This album also peaked at number one for 11 weeks on this chart.

Mexican rock band Maná, with his first studio album since 2002, Amar Es Combatir, entered the Billboard 200 at number four, making it the highest-charting debut for a Spanish-language album for a duo or group. With 30,000 units sold in its first week, Paulina Rubio debuted at number 25 in the Billboard 200 and achieved her third number-one album on this chart with Ananda, after her albums Paulina and Pau-Latina accomplished it in 2001 and 2004, respectively. Luny Tunes and Tainy with Mas Flow: Los Benjamins and Héctor el Father with Los Rompe Discotekas peaked at number one for the first time in their careers. With Trozos de Mi Alma, Vol. 2, singer-songwriter Marco Antonio Solís peaked at number one for the sixth time in his career.

== Albums ==
Chart date	Album	Artist	Reference
January 7	Barrio Fino en Directo	Daddy Yankee	
January 14	Barrio Fino en Directo	Daddy Yankee	
January 21	Barrio Fino en Directo	Daddy Yankee	
January 28	Barrio Fino en Directo	Daddy Yankee	
February 4	Barrio Fino en Directo	Daddy Yankee	
February 11	Barrio Fino en Directo	Daddy Yankee	
February 18	Barrio Fino en Directo	Daddy Yankee	
February 25	Barrio Fino en Directo	Daddy Yankee	
March 4	Barrio Fino en Directo	Daddy Yankee	
March 11	Barrio Fino en Directo	Daddy Yankee	
March 18	Barrio Fino en Directo	Daddy Yankee	
March 25	Barrio Fino en Directo	Daddy Yankee	
April 1	Barrio Fino en Directo	Daddy Yankee	
April 8	Now Latino	Various artists	
April 15	Now Latino	Various artists	
April 22	Now Latino	Various artists	
April 29	Now Latino	Various artists	
May 6	Now Latino	Various artists	
May 13	Now Latino	Various artists	
May 20	Borrón y Cuenta Nueva	Grupo Montéz de Durango	
May 27	Now Latino	Various artists	
June 3	Borrón y Cuenta Nueva	Grupo Montéz de Durango	
June 10	King of Kings	Don Omar	
June 17	King of Kings	Don Omar	
June 24	King of Kings	Don Omar	
July 1	King of Kings	Don Omar	
July 8	King of Kings	Don Omar	
July 15	Los Rompe Discotekas	Héctor el Father	
July 22	Los Rompe Discotekas	Héctor el Father	
July 29	King of Kings	Don Omar	
August 5	King of Kings	Don Omar	
August 12	King of Kings	Don Omar	
August 19	King of Kings	Don Omar	
August 26	King of Kings	Don Omar	
September 2	King of Kings	Don Omar	
September 9	Amar es Combatir	Maná	
September 16	Amar es Combatir	Maná	
September 23	Amar es Combatir	Maná	
September 30	Amar es Combatir	Maná	
October 7	Ananda	Paulina Rubio	
October 14	Mas Flow: Los Benjamins	Luny Tunes & Tainy	
October 21	Trozos de Mi Alma, Vol. 2	Marco Antonio Solís	
October 28	Trozos de Mi Alma, Vol. 2	Marco Antonio Solís	
November 4	Trozos de Mi Alma, Vol. 2	Marco Antonio Solís	
November 11	Crossroads: Cruce de Caminos	Intocable	
November 18	Crossroads: Cruce de Caminos	Intocable	
November 25	MTV Unplugged	Ricky Martin	
December 2	Navidades	Luis Miguel	
December 9	Celestial	RBD	
December 16	Celestial	RBD	
December 23	Celestial	RBD	
December 30	Celestial	RBD	
