= List of number-one Billboard Regional Mexican Songs of 2003 =

The Billboard Regional Mexican Songs chart ranks the best-performing Regional Mexican singles in the United States. Published weekly by Billboard magazine, it ranks the "most popular regional Mexican songs, ranked by radio airplay audience impressions as measured by Nielsen Music."

== Chart history ==
Key
†	Indicates number 1 on Billboard's year-end regional Mexican chart

Issue date	Song	Artist(s)	Ref.
January 4	"Sueña"	Intocable	
January 11	"Sueña"	Intocable	
January 18	"Sueña"	Intocable	
January 25	"Sueña"	Intocable	
February 1	"Sueña"	Intocable	
February 8	"Sueña"	Intocable	
February 15	"Sueña"	Intocable	
February 22	"Sueña"	Intocable	
March 1	"Una vez más" †	Conjunto Primavera	
March 8	"Una vez más" †	Conjunto Primavera	
March 15	"Una vez más" †	Conjunto Primavera	
March 22	"Una vez más" †	Conjunto Primavera	
March 29	"Una vez más" †	Conjunto Primavera	
April 5	"Una vez más" †	Conjunto Primavera	
April 12	"Una vez más" †	Conjunto Primavera	
April 19	"Una vez más" †	Conjunto Primavera	
April 26	"Una vez más" †	Conjunto Primavera	
May 3	"Una vez más" †	Conjunto Primavera	
May 10	"Una vez más" †	Conjunto Primavera	
May 17	"Una vez más" †	Conjunto Primavera	
May 24	"Una vez más" †	Conjunto Primavera	
May 31	"Una vez más" †	Conjunto Primavera	
June 7	"Una vez más" †	Conjunto Primavera	
June 14	"Una vez más" †	Conjunto Primavera	
June 21	"Una vez más" †	Conjunto Primavera	
June 28	"El sinvergüenza"	Los Tucanes de Tijuana	
July 5	"El sinvergüenza"	Los Tucanes de Tijuana	
July 12	"El sinvergüenza"	Los Tucanes de Tijuana	
July 19	"El sinvergüenza"	Los Tucanes de Tijuana	
July 26	"Actos de un tonto"	Conjunto Primavera	
August 2	"Actos de un tonto"	Conjunto Primavera	
August 9	"Actos de un tonto"	Conjunto Primavera	
August 16	"Actos de un tonto"	Conjunto Primavera	
August 23	"Actos de un tonto"	Conjunto Primavera	
August 30	"Estoy a punto"	Bronco: El Gigante de América	
September 6	"Estoy a punto"	Bronco: El Gigante de América	
September 13	"Eso duele"	Intocable	
September 20	"Eso duele"	Intocable	
September 27	"Eso duele"	Intocable	
October 4	"Eso duele"	Intocable	
October 11	"Eso duele"	Intocable	
October 18	"Nomás por tu culpa"	Los Huracanes del Norte	
October 25	"Nomás por tu culpa"	Los Huracanes del Norte	
November 1	"Nomás por tu culpa"	Los Huracanes del Norte	
November 8	"Nomás por tu culpa"	Los Huracanes del Norte	
November 15	"Nomás por tu culpa"	Los Huracanes del Norte	
November 22	"Nomás por tu culpa"	Los Huracanes del Norte	
November 29	"Nomás por tu culpa"	Los Huracanes del Norte	
December 6	"Nomás por tu culpa"	Los Huracanes del Norte	
December 13	"Nomás por tu culpa"	Los Huracanes del Norte	
December 20	"Nomás por tu culpa"	Los Huracanes del Norte	
December 27	"Nomás por tu culpa"	Los Huracanes del Norte	
