= List of number-one Billboard Regional Mexican Songs of 2009 =

The Billboard Regional Mexican Songs chart ranks the best-performing Regional Mexican singles in the United States. Published weekly by Billboard magazine, it ranks the "most popular regional Mexican songs, ranked by radio airplay audience impressions as measured by Nielsen Music."

== Chart history ==
Issue date	Song	Artist(s)	Ref.
January 3	"Espero"	Grupo Montez de Durango	
January 10	"Y que quede claro"	La Arrolladora Banda el Limón de René Camacho	
January 17	"Espero"	Grupo Montez de Durango	
January 24	"Espero"	Grupo Montez de Durango	
January 31	"Espero"	Grupo Montez de Durango	
February 7	"Espero"	Grupo Montez de Durango	
February 14	"Te Presumo"	Banda El Recodo de Cruz Lizárraga	
February 21	"El Ultimo Beso"	Vicente Fernández	
February 28	"Te Presumo"	Banda El Recodo de Cruz Lizárraga	
March 7	"Te Presumo"	Banda El Recodo de Cruz Lizárraga	
March 14	"Te Presumo"	Banda El Recodo de Cruz Lizárraga	
March 21	"Te Presumo"	Banda El Recodo de Cruz Lizárraga	
March 28	"Te Presumo"	Banda El Recodo de Cruz Lizárraga	
April 4	"Te Presumo"	Banda El Recodo de Cruz Lizárraga	
April 11	"Te Presumo"	Banda El Recodo de Cruz Lizárraga	
April 18	"Te Presumo"	Banda El Recodo de Cruz Lizárraga	
April 25	"Te Presumo"	Banda El Recodo de Cruz Lizárraga	
May 2	"Te Presumo"	Banda El Recodo de Cruz Lizárraga	
May 9	"Te Presumo"	Banda El Recodo de Cruz Lizárraga	
May 16	"Te Presumo"	Banda El Recodo de Cruz Lizárraga	
May 23	"Te Presumo"	Banda El Recodo de Cruz Lizárraga	
May 30	"Te Presumo"	Banda El Recodo de Cruz Lizárraga	
June 6	"Ya Es Muy Tarde"	La Arrolladora Banda el Limón de René Camacho	
June 13	"Ya Es Muy Tarde"	La Arrolladora Banda el Limón de René Camacho	
June 20	"Ya Es Muy Tarde"	La Arrolladora Banda el Limón de René Camacho	
June 27	"Ya Es Muy Tarde"	La Arrolladora Banda el Limón de René Camacho	
July 4	"Ya Es Muy Tarde"	La Arrolladora Banda el Limón de René Camacho	
July 11	"Ya Es Muy Tarde"	La Arrolladora Banda el Limón de René Camacho	
July 18	"Ya Es Muy Tarde"	La Arrolladora Banda el Limón de René Camacho	
July 25	"Lo Intentamos"	Espinoza Paz	
August 1	"Ya Es Muy Tarde"	La Arrolladora Banda el Limón de René Camacho	
August 8	"Lo Intentamos"	Espinoza Paz	
August 15	"Lo Intentamos"	Espinoza Paz	
August 22	"Lo Intentamos"	Espinoza Paz	
August 29	"Lo Intentamos"	Espinoza Paz	
September 5	"Lo Intentamos"	Espinoza Paz	
September 12	"Lo Intentamos"	Espinoza Paz	
September 19	"Lo Intentamos"	Espinoza Paz	
September 26	"Lo Intentamos"	Espinoza Paz	
October 3	"La Granja"	Los Tigres del Norte	
October 10	"Lo Intentamos"	Espinoza Paz	
October 17	"Te Ira Mejor Sin Mi"	Joan Sebastian	
October 24	"Lo Intentamos"	Espinoza Paz	
October 31	"Lo Intentamos"	Espinoza Paz	
November 7	"Te Ira Mejor Sin Mi"	Joan Sebastian	
November 14	"Hay Ojitos"	Intocable	
November 21	"Te Ira Mejor Sin Mi"	Joan Sebastian	
November 28	"Hay Ojitos"	Intocable	
December 5	"Me Gusta Todo De Ti"	Banda El Recodo de Cruz Lizárraga	
December 12	"Me Gusta Todo De Ti"	Banda El Recodo de Cruz Lizárraga	
December 19	"Me Gusta Todo De Ti"	Banda El Recodo de Cruz Lizárraga	
December 26	"Me Gusta Todo De Ti"	Banda El Recodo de Cruz Lizárraga	
