= List of number-one Billboard Regional Mexican Songs of 2011 =

The Billboard Regional Mexican Songs chart ranks the best-performing Regional Mexican singles in the United States. Published weekly by Billboard magazine, it ranks the "most popular regional Mexican songs, ranked by radio airplay audience impressions as measured by Nielsen Music."

== Chart history ==
Issue date	Song	Artist(s)	Ref.
January 1	"Ni Lo Intentes"	Julion Alvarez y Su Norteno Banda	
January 8	"Ni Lo Intentes"	Julion Alvarez y Su Norteno Banda	
January 15	"Ni Lo Intentes"	Julion Alvarez y Su Norteno Banda	
January 22	"Ni Lo Intentes"	Julion Alvarez y Su Norteno Banda	
January 29	"Ni Lo Intentes"	Julion Alvarez y Su Norteno Banda	
February 5	"Ni Lo Intentes"	Julion Alvarez y Su Norteno Banda	
February 12	"Ni Lo Intentes"	Julion Alvarez y Su Norteno Banda	
February 19	"Ni Lo Intentes"	Julion Alvarez y Su Norteno Banda	
February 26	"Ni Lo Intentes"	Julion Alvarez y Su Norteno Banda	
March 5	"Ni Lo Intentes"	Julion Alvarez y Su Norteno Banda	
March 12	"Me Encantaria"	Fidel Rueda	
March 19	"Ni Lo Intentes"	Julion Alvarez y Su Norteno Banda	
March 26	"Me Encantaria"	Fidel Rueda	
April 2	"Me Encantaria"	Fidel Rueda	
April 9	"El Padrino"	Joan Sebastian	
April 16	"Me Encantaria"	Fidel Rueda	
April 23	"Me Encantaria"	Fidel Rueda	
April 30	"Me Encantaria"	Fidel Rueda	
May 7	"Me Encantaria"	Fidel Rueda	
May 14	"Me Encantaria"	Fidel Rueda	
May 21	"Me Encantaria"	Fidel Rueda	
May 28	"Te Amo y Te Amo"	La Adictiva Banda San Jose de Mesillas	
June 4	"Te Amo y Te Amo"	La Adictiva Banda San Jose de Mesillas	
June 11	"Te Amo y Te Amo"	La Adictiva Banda San Jose de Mesillas	
June 18	"Te Amo y Te Amo"	La Adictiva Banda San Jose de Mesillas	
June 25	"Te Amo y Te Amo"	La Adictiva Banda San Jose de Mesillas	
July 2	"Te Amo y Te Amo"	La Adictiva Banda San Jose de Mesillas	
July 9	"Prometi"	Intocable	
July 16	"Te Amo y Te Amo"	La Adictiva Banda San Jose de Mesillas	
July 23	"Te Amo y Te Amo"	La Adictiva Banda San Jose de Mesillas	
July 30	"Prometi"	Intocable	
August 6	"Te Amo y Te Amo"	La Adictiva Banda San Jose de Mesillas	
August 13	"Di Que Regresaras"	La Original Banda el Limon de Salvador Lizarraga	
August 20	"Di Que Regresaras"	La Original Banda el Limon de Salvador Lizarraga	
August 27	"Di Que Regresaras"	La Original Banda el Limon de Salvador Lizarraga	
September 3	"Di Que Regresaras"	La Original Banda el Limon de Salvador Lizarraga	
September 10	"Di Que Regresaras"	La Original Banda el Limon de Salvador Lizarraga	
September 17	"Di Que Regresaras"	La Original Banda el Limon de Salvador Lizarraga	
September 24	"Olvidame"	Julion Alvarez y Su Norteno Banda	
October 1	"Olvidame"	Julion Alvarez y Su Norteno Banda	
October 8	"Olvidame"	Julion Alvarez y Su Norteno Banda	
October 15	"Olvidame"	Julion Alvarez y Su Norteno Banda	
October 22	"Olvidame"	Julion Alvarez y Su Norteno Banda	
October 29	"Olvidame"	Julion Alvarez y Su Norteno Banda	
November 5	"Olvidame"	Julion Alvarez y Su Norteno Banda	
November 12	"El Mil Amores"	Pesado	
November 19	"El Mil Amores"	Pesado	
November 26	"El Mil Amores"	Pesado	
December 3	"El Mil Amores"	Pesado	
December 10	"Te Quiero A Morir"	Banda El Recodo de Cruz Lizarraga	
December 17	"Te Quiero A Morir"	Banda El Recodo de Cruz Lizarraga	
December 24	"Te Quiero A Morir"	Banda El Recodo de Cruz Lizarraga	
December 31	"Nada Iguales"	La Adictiva Banda San Jose de Mesillas	
