= List of number-one Billboard Regional Mexican Songs of 2010 =

The Billboard Regional Mexican Songs chart ranks the best-performing Regional Mexican singles in the United States. Published weekly by Billboard magazine, it ranks the "most popular regional Mexican songs, ranked by radio airplay audience impressions as measured by Nielsen Music."

== Chart history ==
Issue date	Song	Artist(s)	Ref.
January 2	"Me Gusta Todo De Ti"	Banda El Recodo de Cruz Lizárraga	
January 9	"Me Gusta Todo De Ti"	Banda El Recodo de Cruz Lizárraga	
January 16	"Me Gusta Todo De Ti"	Banda El Recodo de Cruz Lizárraga	
January 23	"Me Gusta Todo De Ti"	Banda El Recodo de Cruz Lizárraga	
January 30	"Me Gusta Todo De Ti"	Banda El Recodo de Cruz Lizárraga	
February 6	"Me Gusta Todo De Ti"	Banda El Recodo de Cruz Lizárraga	
February 13	"Ando Bien Pedo"	Banda Los Recoditos	
February 20	"Ando Bien Pedo"	Banda Los Recoditos	
February 27	"Ando Bien Pedo"	Banda Los Recoditos	
March 6	"Ando Bien Pedo"	Banda Los Recoditos	
March 13	"Ando Bien Pedo"	Banda Los Recoditos	
March 20	"Ando Bien Pedo"	Banda Los Recoditos	
March 27	"Ando Bien Pedo"	Banda Los Recoditos	
April 3	"Ando Bien Pedo"	Banda Los Recoditos	
April 10	"Ando Bien Pedo"	Banda Los Recoditos	
April 17	"Me Gusta Todo De Ti"	Banda El Recodo de Cruz Lizárraga	
April 24	"Ando Bien Pedo"	Banda Los Recoditos	
May 1	"Ando Bien Pedo"	Banda Los Recoditos	
May 8	"Ando Bien Pedo"	Banda Los Recoditos	
May 15	"Al Menos"	Original Banda el Limon de Salvador Lizarraga	
May 23	"Al Menos"	Original Banda el Limon de Salvador Lizarraga	
May 30	"Al Menos"	Original Banda el Limon de Salvador Lizarraga	
June 5	"Al Menos"	Original Banda el Limon de Salvador Lizarraga	
June 12	"La Peinada"	Chuy Lizarraga y Su Banda Tierra Sinaloense	
June 19	"Dime Que Me Quieres"	Banda El Recodo de Cruz Lizarraga	
June 26	"Dime Que Me Quieres"	Banda El Recodo de Cruz Lizarraga	
July 3	"Dime Que Me Quieres"	Banda El Recodo de Cruz Lizarraga	
July 10	"Dime Que Me Quieres"	Banda El Recodo de Cruz Lizarraga	
July 17	"Dime Que Me Quieres"	Banda El Recodo de Cruz Lizarraga	
July 24	"Dime Que Me Quieres"	Banda El Recodo de Cruz Lizarraga	
July 31	"Dime Que Me Quieres"	Banda El Recodo de Cruz Lizarraga	
August 7	"Dime Que Me Quieres"	Banda El Recodo de Cruz Lizarraga	
August 14	"Dime Que Me Quieres"	Banda El Recodo de Cruz Lizarraga	
August 21	"Dime Que Me Quieres"	Banda El Recodo de Cruz Lizarraga	
August 28	"Dime Que Me Quieres"	Banda El Recodo de Cruz Lizarraga	
September 4	"Dime Que Me Quieres"	Banda El Recodo de Cruz Lizarraga	
September 11	"Dime Que Me Quieres"	Banda El Recodo de Cruz Lizarraga	
September 18	"Dime Que Me Quieres"	Banda El Recodo de Cruz Lizarraga	
September 25	"Dime Que Me Quieres"	Banda El Recodo de Cruz Lizarraga	
October 2	"Dime Que Me Quieres"	Banda El Recodo de Cruz Lizarraga	
October 9	"Dime Que Me Quieres"	Banda El Recodo de Cruz Lizarraga	
October 16	"Nina De Mi Corazon"	La Arrolladora Banda el Limon de Rene Camacho	
October 23	"Nina De Mi Corazon"	La Arrolladora Banda el Limon de Rene Camacho	
October 30	"Nina De Mi Corazon"	La Arrolladora Banda el Limon de Rene Camacho	
November 6	"Nina De Mi Corazon"	La Arrolladora Banda el Limon de Rene Camacho	
November 13	"Nina De Mi Corazon"	La Arrolladora Banda el Limon de Rene Camacho	
November 20	"Nina De Mi Corazon"	La Arrolladora Banda el Limon de Rene Camacho	
November 27	"Nina De Mi Corazon"	La Arrolladora Banda el Limon de Rene Camacho	
December 4	"Nina De Mi Corazon"	La Arrolladora Banda el Limon de Rene Camacho	
December 11	"Nina De Mi Corazon"	La Arrolladora Banda el Limon de Rene Camacho	
December 18	"Nina De Mi Corazon"	La Arrolladora Banda el Limon de Rene Camacho	
December 25	"Ni Lo Intentes"	Julion Alvarez y Su Norteno Banda	
