= Ando Bien Pedo =

Single by Mexican group Banda Los Recoditos

Single by Banda Los Recoditos

from the album ¡Ando Bien Pedo!
- Released: 2010
- Genre: Banda ranchera
- Length: 2:24
- Label: Disa
- Songwriter: Zapata
- Producer: Alfonso Lizárraga

Banda Los Recoditos singles chronology
"Ando Bien Pedo" (2010)	"No Te Quiero Perder" (2010)

"Ando Bien Pedo" (Mexican Slang for "I'm Very Drunk") is a song performed by Regional Mexican group Banda Los Recoditos. It was produced by Alfonso Lizárraga for the band eleventh studio album of the same title in 2010. Released as the first single from the album, the song became their first number-one single for the band in the Billboard Top Latin Songs chart. Due to the success of the song, the aforementioned album peaked at number one in the Billboard Top Latin Albums chart. The band performed the song at José Miguel Agrelot Coliseum in Puerto Rico at the 2010 Billboard Latin Music Awards. In the review for the parent album, David Jeffries of Allmusic, named the track "polished" and "flashy".

The track debuted in the Billboard Regional Mexican Songs chart on January 2, 2010, at number 40 and climbed to the top ten of the chart four weeks later. "Ando Bien Pedo" peaked at number-one on February 13, 2010, spending twelve non-consecutive weeks at the top. "Ando Bien Pedo" also peaked at number-one in the Billboard Top Latin Songs chart during four non-consecutive weeks. The song debuted in the main Latin chart at number 34, and climbed to the top ten two weeks later. It replaced at the top of the chart "Dile al Amor" by Aventura on March 20, 2010, being replaced by "Me Gusta Todo de Tí" by Banda el Recodo two weeks later. The song returned to the number-one spot three weeks later, and was succeeded at the top by "Mi Niña Bonita" performed by Chino & Nacho. "Ando Bien Pedo" ranked sixth at the Billboard Top Latin Songs Year-End Chart of 2010.

"Ando Bien Pedo" received nominations for Song of the Year, Banda Song of the Year and Hot Song of the Year at the 2010 Monitor Latino Awards.

== Charts ==
=== Weekly charts ===
Chart (2010)	Peak position
US Bubbling Under Hot 100 (Billboard)	13
US Hot Latin Songs (Billboard)	1
US Regional Mexican Airplay (Billboard)	1

=== Year-end charts ===
Chart (2010)	Position
US Hot Latin Songs (Billboard)	6

=== Decade-end charts ===
Chart (2010–2019)	Position
US Hot Latin Songs (Billboard)	47
