= Solamente Tú (album) =

Solamente tú

Studio album by Duelo
- Released: April 6, 2010
- Genre: Regional Mexican
- Length: 37:57
- Label: Fonovisa

Duelo chronology
Por Una Mujer Bonita (2010)	Solamente tú (2010)	Vuela Muy Alto (2011)

Singles from Solamente tú
- 1. "Soy como no soy" Released: February 10, 2010; 2. "Te odio y te amo" Released: November 2010

Solamente tú (Only You) is the eighth studio album by Regional Mexican band Duelo. It was released on April 16, 2010 by Fonovisa Records. The songs are mostly inspired by disappointment in love. Musically, the album drew inspiration from country rock and Americana while incorporating the band’s signature norteño style.

The album received positive reviews, commending Duelo's ability to sing about romantic love, instead of entering the fashion of contemporary groups that perform narcocorridos. The album went to number-one in the United States, topping the Billboard's Latin Albums and Regional Mexican Albums charts, and reaching the top forty in Mexico. The first two singles from the album, "Soy como no soy" and "Te odio y te amo", were both hits reaching the top forty in the Regional Mexican Airplay chart. Solamente Tú received a Latin Grammy Award nomination for Best Norteño Album.

== Background ==
Duelo released their eighth album Solamente tú on April 16, 2010, and as another way of promotion, the band released an internet radio station, Radio Duelo, in addition to updating their official website. On their radio station the band responded to text messages from their fans and included music from their albums. Solamente tú includes love songs lyrics with norteño music, with country rock and Americana influences. Alex Henderson of Allmusic called the album "appealing", praising the band for their approach on romantic love instead of recording corridos like most norteño bands. The album received a nomination for Best Norteño Album at the 11th Latin Grammy Awards, which it lost to Pesado's Desde la cantina, vol. 1.

== Chart performance ==
=== Singles ===
Prior to the album release, the first single "Soy como no soy" ("I'm Being Not the Way I Am") was launched in February 2010. The song peaked at number 22 on the Billboard Latin Songs and 11 on the Regional Mexican Airplay charts, respectively. "Te odio y te amo" ("I Hate You and I Love You") was selected as the second single and peaked within the top forty of the Latin Songs chart.

=== Album ===
The album entered atop the Billboard's Latin Albums and Regional Mexican Albums charts in the week of April 24, 2010, and was their second number-one album at both charts, following 2009's Necesito más de tí. Solamente Tú also charted in the Mexican Albums Chart where it peaked at number 26.

== Track listing ==
This track listing adapted from Allmusic and liner notes.

No.	Title	Writer(s)	Length
1.	"Solamente tú"	Oscar Ivan Treviño	3:15
2.	"Mil deseos"	Treviño	3:07
3.	"La ley del desprecio"	Treviño	3:07
4.	"Voy a cambiar por ti"	Aarón Martínez	3:17
5.	"Soy como no soy"	Luis Padilla	3:17
6.	"Qué lástima"	Treviño	3:48
7.	"Lo mejor de perderte"	Treviño	2:57
8.	"Jamás vuelvas conmigo"	Marco A. Pérez	2:59
9.	"La magia de tu amor"	Treviño	2:54
10.	"Soñando contigo"	Padilla, Treviño	2:46
11.	"Te odio y te amo"	Wilfrán Castillo	3:05
12.	"Igual que hoy"	Treviño	3:07

== Personnel ==
- José Luis Ayala Jr. – drums
- Oscar Iván Treviño – bass guitar, composer
- Homer Cantu – güiro
- Manelik Martínez – management
- Jaime Arroyo – mixing
- Wilfrán Castillo – composer
- Aarón Martínez – composer
- Luis Padilla – composer
- Marco A. Pérez – composer

== See also ==
- List of number-one Billboard Latin Albums from the 2010s
