= X (Intocable album) =

Studio album by Intocable
- Released: February 15, 2005
- Genres: Northeastern Norteño; Latin rock
- Length: Disc one: 53:01; Disc two: 45:35
- Label: EMI Latin
- Producers: Intocable; Pepe Aguilar; Carlos Cabral Jr.; Jason Cano; Alex Espinoza; Chuy Flores; Kinky; Jorge Lares Amaro; René Martínez; Ricardo Muñoz; Sacha Triujeque; Alan Baxter; Nir Seroussi; Tom Baumgartner

Intocable chronology
Intimamente (2004)	X (2005)	Crossroads: Cruce de Caminos (2006)

Singles from X
- 1. "Aire" Released: 2005

X (also titled X (Diez), "Ten" in English) is a double album by regional Mexican band Intocable, released on February 15, 2005 through EMI Latin. It was produced by René Martínez and Ricardo Muñoz, two members of the band, alongside Pepe Aguilar, Carlos Cabral Jr., Jason Cano, Alex Espinoza, Chuy Flores, Kinky, Jorge Lares Amaro, Sacha Triujeque, Alan Baxter, Nir Seroussi and Tom Baumgartner. The album features collaborations from Kinky, Jumbo, DJ Kane, Ice, Tego Calderon, Volován, Pepe Aguilar and Natalia y la Forquetina.

At the 6th Annual Latin Grammy Awards, the album was nominated for Album of the Year and Best Engineered Album and won Best Norteño Album while "Aire" won Best Regional Mexican Song. It was also nominated for Best Mexican/Mexican-American Album at the 48th Annual Grammy Awards.

The album topped the Regional Mexican Albums chart, being the band's ninth album to do so, it also peaked at numbers two and sixty-two on the Top Latin Albums and Billboard 200 charts, respectively. In addition, it was certified platinum in both Mexico and United States.

== Background ==
The double album is an anniversary package produced to celebrate the band's ten-year career signed under EMI Latin, the album is composed by two discs, the first one consists of fourteen original tracks, while the second one is titled X-tra and consists of eleven versions of various songs by the band recorded by themselves and different artists such as Mexican rock bands Kinky ("Coquta") and Jumbo ("Enséñame a Olvidarte"), as well as American singers Pepe Aguilar ("Fuerte No Soy") and DJ Kane ("En Paz Descanse" and "Es Tan Bello (R&B Version)"), among others.

== Singles ==
The song "Aire" was released as a single to promote the album prior to its release, the song debuted at number 23 on the Hot Latin Songs chart, eventually reaching the top position for four weeks, being the band's first and only number-one song in the chart to date. The songs "Contra Viento y Marea" and "Alguien te va a Hacer Llorar" also appeared on the chart, peaking at number two and seventeen, respectively, both in 2006. Additionally, both "Aire" and "Contra Viento y Marea" topped the Regional Mexican Songs chart, being the band's ninth and tenth number-one song on the chart.

== Critical reception ==
Leila Cobos from American magazine Billboard commented that "while X has sophisticated norteño fare like the single "Aire", X-tra has delicious readings of songs like "Enséñame a Olvidarte" (performed by Jumbo) and a crunchy rock'n'roll version of "Ya Ves" by Volován", she finished the review writing that "the end result is a disc for purists and thrill seekers, anchored by fine songs that endure different genres and arrangements".

== Track listing ==
X track listing
No.	Title	Writer(s)	Producer(s)	Length
1.	"Soledad (Siento Morir)"	Johnny Lee Rosas; Josué Contreras	Intocable; Ricardo Muñoz; René Martínez; Alan Baxter; Nir Seroussi	3:43
2.	"Alguien te va a Hacer Llorar"	Luis Gerardo Padilla	Intocable	4:09
3.	"En Paz Descanse"	Aarón Martínez "La Pantera"	Intocable; Muñoz; Martínez; Baxter; Seroussi	3:21
4.	"Aire"	Rosas; Contreras	Intocable	4:04
5.	"Momentos"	Martínez "La Pantera"	Intocable; Muñoz; Martínez; Baxter; Seroussi	2:01
6.	"Olvídame Tú"	Valentino	Intocable; Muñoz; Martínez; Baxter; Seroussi	3:12
7.	"A Obscuras"	José Roberto Martínez	Intocable; Muñoz; Martínez; Baxter; Seroussi	3:15
8.	"Herido del Corazón"	Padilla	Intocable; Muñoz; Martínez; Baxter; Seroussi	3:26
9.	"Ahora que te Perdí"	Valentino	Intocable; Muñoz; Martínez; Baxter; Seroussi	3:39
10.	"Te Amo"	Padilla	Intocable; Muñoz; Martínez; Baxter; Seroussi	3:50
11.	"Es Mejor Decir Adiós"	Padilla	Intocable; Muñoz; Martínez; Baxter; Seroussi	4:20
12.	"Es Alguien Más"	Padilla	Intocable; Muñoz; Martínez; Baxter; Seroussi	3:14
13.	"Tiempo"	Martínez "La Pantera"	Intocable; Muñoz; Martínez; Baxter; Seroussi	3:27
14.	"A Veces"	Padilla	Intocable; Muñoz; Martínez; Baxter; Seroussi	3:35
15.	"Contra Viento y Marea"	J. E. Murgia; Mauricio L. Arriaga	Muñoz	3:41
Total length:				53:01

X-tra track listing
No.	Title	Writer(s)	Producer(s)	Length
1.	"Aire (Pop Version)"	Rosas; Contreras	Intocable	4:12
2.	"Coqueta" (featuring Kinky)	Padilla	Kinky; Tom Baumgartner	3:37
3.	"Enseñame a Olvidarte" (featuring Jumbo)	Padilla	Chuy Flores	3:50
4.	"En Paz Descanse" (featuring DJ Kane, Ice and Tego Calderon)	Padilla	Alex Espinoza	3:09
5.	"Ya Ves" (featuring Volován)	Padilla	Sacha Truijeque	3:26
6.	"Estas que te Pelas"	Cornelio Reyna Jr.; Marco Antonio Pérez	Flores	4:13
7.	"Fuerte No Soy" (featuring Pepe Aguilar)	Pérez; Ricardo Muñoz	Pepe Aguilar	4:26
8.	"Déjate Amar"	Mariajose Ospino	Flores	4:31
9.	"Es Tan Bello (R&B Version)" (featuring DJ Kane)	Miguel Mendoza	Jason Cano	3:52
10.	"Déjame Amarte"	Eduardo Alanis	Carlos Cabral Jr.	3:19
11.	"Y Todo Para Qué" (featuring Natalia y la Forquetina)	Pedro Reyna	Jorge Luis Amaro Lares	3:10
12.	"Entre Querer y Amar"	Adrian "Nano" González; Marc Tovar	Cabral Jr.	3:44
Total length:				45:35

== Charts ==
Weekly chart performance for X
Chart (2005)	Peak position
US Billboard 200	62
US Top Latin Albums (Billboard)	2
US Regional Mexican Albums (Billboard)	1

== Certifications ==
Certifications for X
Region	Certification	Certified units/sales
Mexico (AMPROFON)	2× Platinum	200,000^{^}
United States (RIAA)	18× Platinum (Latin)	1,080,000^{‡}
^{^} Shipments figures based on certification alone.^{‡} Sales+streaming figures based on certification alone.
