= En Vivo Desde Chicago =

Live album by Grupo Montéz de Durango
- Released: March 23, 2004
- Genre: Duranguense
- Label: Disa

Grupo Montéz de Durango chronology
De Durango a Chicago (2003)	En Vivo Desde Chicago (2004)	Y Sigue La Mata Dando (2005)

Alternative cover
- CD/DVD Edition

Professional ratings
Review scores
Source	Rating
Allmusic	3/5 stars

En Vivo Desde Chicago (Eng.: Live From Chicago) is the title of a live album released by duranguense ensemble Grupo Montéz de Durango. This album became their first number-one set on the Billboard Top Latin Albums.

== Track listing ==
The information from Billboard and Allmusic.

=== CD ===
No.	Title	Writer(s)	Length
1.	"El Sube y Baja"	Felipe Valdez Leal	3:02
2.	"Lágrimas de Cristal"	Ted Harris	2:49
3.	"El Verde Pinto"	María Fernández	2:52
4.	"En Otros Tiempos"	Valdez	3:11
5.	"Pasito Duranguense"	Alfredo Ramírez Corral	3:07
6.	"Las Mismas Piedras"	Bilma Márquez	3:08
7.	"Hoy Empieza Mi Tristeza"	Joan Sebastian	3:22
8.	"Llegando a Zacatecas"	Alfredo Ramírez	3:00
9.	"La Revolcada"	Narcizo Martínez	1:58
10.	"Camino a Tepehuanes"		3:01
11.	"El Huerfano"	Domingo Chávez Pérez	2:31
12.	"Lino Rodarte"	Paulino Vargas	2:46
13.	"Colonia Hidalgo, Durango Querido"	Héctor Montemayor	2:07
14.	"Hoy Empieza Mi Tristeza (Ranchera)"	Sebastian	3:34

=== DVD ===
No.	Title	Writer(s)	Length
1.	"El Sube y Baja"	Valdez	3:02
2.	"Lágrimas de Cristal"	Harris	2:49
3.	"El Verde Pinito"	Fernández	2:52
4.	"En Otros Tiempos"	Valdez	3:11
5.	"Pasito Duranguense"	Ramírez	3:07
6.	"Las Mismas Piedras"	Márquez	3:08
7.	"Hoy Empieza Mi Tristeza"	Sebastian	3:22
8.	"La Revolcada"	Martínez	1:58
9.	"Camino a Tepehuanes"	Chávez	3:01
10.	"El Huerfano"	Chávez	2:31
11.	"Lino Rodarte"	Vargas	2:46
12.	"Colonia Hidalgo, Durango Querido"	Montemayor	2:07

=== Multimedia ===
No.	Title	Writer(s)	Length
1.	"El Sube y Baja"	Valdez	3:02
2.	"Las Mismas Piedras"	Márquez	3:08
3.	"Hoy Empieza Mi Tristeza"	Sebastian	3:22
4.	"Lágrimas de Cristal"	Harris	2:49

== Chart performance ==
Chart (2004)	Peak position
US Billboard Top Latin Albums	1
US Billboard Regional/Mexican Albums	1
US Billboard 200	91

== Sales and certifications ==
Region	Certification	Certified units/sales
United States (RIAA)	2× Platinum (Latin)	200,000^{^}
^{^} Shipments figures based on certification alone.
