= ¡Ando Bien Pedo! =

2010 studio album by Mexican group Banda Los Recoditos

Studio album by Banda Los Recoditos
- Released: 2010
- Genre: Banda
- Length: 26:12
- Label: Disa
- Producer: Alfonso Lizárraga

Banda Los Recoditos chronology
Y Seguimos Enamorados (2009)	¡Ando Bien Pedo! (2010)	A Toda Madre (2011)

Professional ratings
Review scores
Source	Rating
AllMusic	3.5/5 stars

¡Ando Bien Pedo! (lit. 'I am very drunk' in Spanish) is the title of a studio album released by regional Mexican group Banda Los Recoditos in 2010. The album became their first number-one title in the Billboard Top Latin Albums chart. The lead single of the same name peaked at number-one in the Hot Latin Songs and Regional Mexican Songs charts in the United States. Ando Bien Pedo received a nomination for Best Banda Album at the 11th Latin Grammy Awards. The album has sold more than 550,000 copies worldwide.

== Track listing ==
The information from Allmusic.

No.	Title	Length
1.	"Ando Bien Pedo"	2:24
2.	"Extráñame"	2:50
3.	"Cumbia del Camaroncito"	2:33
4.	"La Escuelita"	2:05
5.	"Tu Decisión"	2:47
6.	"El Último Billete"	1:56
7.	"No Te Quiero Perder"	3:28
8.	"Del Tingo al Tango"	2:18
9.	"Aunque Sea Por Teléfono"	2:41
10.	"Me Gusta Me Gusta"	3:10

== Charts ==
=== Weekly charts ===
Chart (2010)	Peak position
US Billboard 200	87
US Top Latin Albums (Billboard)	1
US Regional Mexican Albums (Billboard)	1

=== Year-end charts ===
Chart (2010)	Position
US Top Latin Albums (Billboard)	15

== Sales and certifications ==
Region	Certification	Certified units/sales
United States (RIAA)	Platinum (Latin)	100,000^{^}
^{^} Shipments figures based on certification alone.

== See also ==
- List of number-one Billboard Latin Albums from the 2010s
