= Y Sigue La Mata Dando =

Studio album by Grupo Montéz de Durango
- Released: February 1, 2005
- Recorded: October 2004
- Genre: Duranguense
- Label: Disa

Grupo Montéz de Durango chronology
En Vivo Desde Chicago (2004)	Y Sigue La Mata Dando (2005)	Borrón y Cuenta Nueva (2006)

Professional ratings
Review scores
Source	Rating
Allmusic	4/5 stars

Y Sigue La Mata Dando (Eng.: And We Keep Doing It) is the title of a studio album released by duranguense ensemble Grupo Montéz de Durango. This album became their second number-one set on the Billboard Top Latin Albums. A special edition was also released including a DVD with music videos and karaoke versions of the songs included, along with biography, discography and photo gallery of the group.

== Track listing ==
The information from Billboard and Allmusic.

=== CD track listing ===
No.	Title	Writer(s)	Length
1.	"Vestida de Color de Rosa"	Enrique Valencia	2:31
2.	"Puro Durango"	José Isabel Ramos	2:53
3.	"Contrabando en Juarez"	Paulino Vargas	2:34
4.	"Adios Amor Te Vas"	Juan Gabriel	2:39
5.	"De Esta Sierra a la Otra"	Octavio Martínez De La Rosa	2:52
6.	"Solo Dejé Yo a Mi Padre"	Ernesto José Reyna	3:32
7.	"Seis Renglones"	Placido Villa	2:17
8.	"Me Llamas"	José Luis Perales	3:04
9.	"Te Voy a Esperar"	Marco Antonio Solís	3:19
10.	"Una Lágrima"	Giancarlo Bigazzi, Ruggero Cini	3:51
11.	"Quiero Saber de Tí"	Wilfran Castillo	3:00
12.	"Lástima Es Mi Mujer"	Gabriel	3:02
13.	"Esperanzas"	José Herrero Pozo	3:13
14.	"La Historia"	Adalberto Terrazas	2:28

=== DVD track listing ===
No.	Title	Writer(s)	Length
1.	"Lágrimas de Cristal [Video]"	Ted Harris	2:49
2.	"Lástima Es Mi Mujer [Video]"	Gabriel	2:49
3.	"Hoy Empieza Mi Tristeza"	Joan Sebastian	3:22
4.	"Te Quise Olvidar [Ballad]"	Gabriel	3:11
5.	"Quiero Saber de Ti [Duranguense]"	Castillo	3:07
6.	"El Sube y Baja [Video]"	Felipe Váldez Leal, Ramón Ortega	2:59
7.	"Quiero Saber de Tí [multimedia track]"	Castillo	3:22
8.	"Biography"
9.	"Discography"
10.	"Photo Gallery"

== Personnel ==
This information from Allmusic.

- Marty Bilecki — Engineer, digital mastering, mixing
- Alfredo Ramírez Corral — Arranger, keyboards, vocals, engineer, digital mastering, mixing
- Gerardo Vázquez G. — Creative director
- Elías Méndez — Saxophone, guest appearance
- Ismael J. Montoya — Creative director
- Jesús Ortíz — Engineer, Mixing
- Armando Aguirre Ramírez — Tamboura
- Daniel Avila Terrazas — Tamboura, drums
- Jose Luis Terrazas — Director, performer, drums, creative consultant

== Chart performance ==
Chart (2004)	Peak position
US Billboard Top Latin Albums	1
US Billboard Regional/Mexican Albums	1
US Billboard 200	34

== Sales and certifications ==
Region	Certification	Certified units/sales
United States (RIAA)	Gold	500,000^{^}
^{^} Shipments figures based on certification alone.
