= La Historia (Intocable album) =

Greatest hits album by Intocable
- Released: February 11, 2003
- Genres: Tejano, Northeastern Norteño
- Label: EMI
- Producers: Ricky Muñoz, René Martínez

Intocable chronology
Sueños (2002)	La Historia (2003)	Nuestro Destino Estaba Escrito (2003)

La Historia (Eng.: The History) is a compilation album released by regional Mexican band Intocable. This album became their second number-one set on the Billboard Top Latin Albums. It was released with two formats, CD and CD/DVD and both versions charted separately.

== Track listing ==
Adapted from Billboard and AllMusic.

=== CD ===
1. Es Tan Bello (Miguel Mendoza) – 3:47
2. Enséñame a Olvidarte (Luis Padilla) – 3:24
3. Te Voy a Conquistar (Servando Cano) – 2:32
4. ¿Y Todo Para Qué? (Pedro Reyna) – 3:11
5. Déjame Amarte (Eduardo Alanis) – 3:31
6. ¿Dónde Estás? (Alanis) – 4:04
7. Por un Beso (Marco A. Pérez) – 3:30
8. No Te Vayas (Gilberto Abrego) – 3:27
9. Huracán (Pérez) – 2:56
10. Vivir Sin Ellas (Cano) – 3:04
11. Estás Que Te Pelas (Pérez/Cornelio Reyna Jr.) – 3:54
12. Contigo (A.B. Quintanilla/Luigi Giraldo) – 3:24
13. Eres Mi Droga (Mendoza) – 3:25
14. Ayúdame (Pérez) – 4:27
15. Un Desengaño (Cesar Alaffa) – 3:33
16. Amor Maldito (Mendoza) – 3:23
17. Coqueta (Padilla) – 3:01
18. ¿Por Qué Tenías Que Ser Tú? (Miguel A. Estrada) – 2:56
19. Perdedor (Pérez) – 4:18
20. El Amigo Que Se Fue (Miguel Luna/Mendoza) – 3:39

=== DVD ===
1. Sueña (Padilla) – 4:16
2. El Poder de Tus Manos (Padilla) – 3:06
3. Déjame Amarte (Alanis) – 3:30
4. Enséñame a Olvidarte (Padilla) – 3:22
5. Ya Estoy Cansado (Padilla) – 2:38
6. El Amigo Que Se Fue (Luna/Mendoza) – 3:47
7. Perdedor (Pérez) – 4:16
8. Amor Maldito (Mendoza) – 3:20
9. ¿Dónde Estás? (Alanis) – 4:41
10. ¿Y Todo Para Qué? (Reyna) – 3:14
11. No Te Vayas (Abrego) – 3:33
12. Coqueta (Padilla) – 3:00

== Personnel ==
The information form Allmusic.

- Nir Seroussi – Producer
- Miguel Trujillo – Executive producer
- Gregg Vickers – Concept
- Norma Vivanco – Graphic design
- César Hernández – Photography
- José Quintero – Photography

== Chart performance ==
=== CD/DVD edition ===
Chart (2003)	Peak position
US Billboard Top Latin Albums	1
US Billboard Regional/Mexican Albums	1
US Billboard 200	60

=== Standard edition ===
Chart (2003)	Peak position
US Billboard Top Latin Albums	3

== Sales and certifications ==
Region	Certification	Certified units/sales
Mexico (AMPROFON)	Gold	75,000^{^}
United States (RIAA)	2× Platinum (Latin)	200,000^{^}
^{^} Shipments figures based on certification alone.
