= Nuestro Destino Estaba Escrito =

Studio album by Intocable
- Released: August 19, 2003 (Standard Edition); October 27, 2003 (Historia y Tradición Edition)
- Genres: Tejano, Northeastern Norteño
- Label: EMI
- Producers: René Martínez, Ricky Muñoz

Intocable chronology
La Historia (2003)	Nuestro Destino Estaba Escrito (2003)	Intimamente (2004)

Alternative cover
- Historia y Tradición edition

Professional ratings
Review scores
Source	Rating
Allmusic	3.5/5 stars

Nuestro Destino Estaba Escrito (Eng.: Our Destiny Was Written) is a studio album released by Regional Mexican band Intocable. This album became their third number-one set on the Billboard Top Latin Albums. It was released with two formats, CD and CD/DVD, and in 2007 a new edition retitled Nuestro Destino Estaba Escrito: Historia y Tradición. This release received a nomination for a Grammy Award for Best Mexican/Mexican-American Album.

== Track listing ==
The track listing from Billboard.com

=== CD and CD/DVD ===
No.	Title	Writer(s)	Length
1.	"¿A Dónde Estabas?"	Roberto Martínez	3:35
2.	"Soy un Novato"	Luis Padilla	3:14
3.	"¿Cuántas Veces?"	Padilla	3:41
4.	"Eso Duele"	Padilla	3:16
5.	"Invisible"	Marco Pérez	3:16
6.	"Si Pudiera"	Padilla	4:09
7.	"Aunque Me Duela"	Martínez	3:02
8.	"Siempre Al Final"	Aaron Martínez	4:09
9.	"Historia de Amor"	Josué Contreras	3:29
10.	"Si Nos Tenemos"	Padilla	3:46

=== Historia y Tradición edition ===
This information from Allmusic.

No.	Title	Writer(s)	Length
11.	"Eso Duele (Multimedia Track)"	Padilla	3:18

== Credits ==
The information form Allmusic.

- René Martínez — Producer, group member
- Ricky Muñoz — Producer, group member
- Luis Padilla — Arranger, vocals
- Gilbert Velasquez — Recording
- Jay Frigoletto — Mastering
- Gabriel Wallach — Mastering
- Jack Saenz — Mixing
- Intocable — Arranger
- Johnny Lee Rosas — Arranger
- Silvestre Rodríguez — Group member
- José Angel González — Group member
- José Juan Hernández — Group member
- José Ángel Farías — Group member
- Félix G. Salinas — Group member
- Daniel Sánchez — Group member
- Sergio Serna — Group member
- Nelsón González — Graphic design, Art direction

== Chart performance ==
Chart (2003)	Peak position
US Billboard Top Latin Albums	1
US Billboard Regional/Mexican Albums	1
US Billboard 200	95

== Sales and certifications ==
Region	Certification	Certified units/sales
Mexico (AMPROFON)	Platinum+Gold	150,000^{^}
United States (RIAA)	2× Platinum (Latin)	200,000^{^}
^{^} Shipments figures based on certification alone.
