= Intimamente =

Live album by Intocable
- Released: February 24, 2004
- Genre: Tejano, Northeastern Norteño
- Label: EMI
- Producer: René Martínez, Ricky Muñoz

Intocable chronology
Nuestro Destino Estaba Escrito (2003)	Intimamente (2004)	X (2005)

Professional ratings
Review scores
Source	Rating
Allmusic	3.5/5 stars

Intimamente: En Vivo Live (Eng.: Intimately: Live) is the title of a live album released by regional Mexican band Intocable. This album became their fourth number-one set on the Billboard Top Latin Albums. It was released with two formats, CD and CD/DVD, and won the Grammy Award for Best Mexican/Mexican-American Album.

== Track listing ==
The track listing from Billboard.com

=== CD track listing ===
No.	Title	Writer(s)	Length
1.	"Enseñame a Olividarte"	Luis Padilla	3:28
2.	"Déjame Amarte"	Eduardo Alanis	3:47
3.	"Es Tan Bello"	Miguel Mendoza	3:59
4.	"Estás Que Te Pelas"	Marco Antonio Pérez, Cornelio Reyna Jr.	3:53
5.	"Eso Duele"	Padilla	3:14
6.	"El Amigo Que Se Fue"	Miguel Luna, Mendoza	3:11
7.	"Llévame Contigo"	Pérez	3:15
8.	"Fuerte No Soy"	Ricardo Muñoz, Pérez	4:38
9.	"Soñador Eterno"	Padilla	3:13
10.	"Y Todo Para Qué?"	Pedro Reyna	3:12
11.	"Eres Mi Droga"	Mendoza	2:16
12.	"Perdedor/Ayúdame (Medley)"	Pérez	4:41
13.	"Coqueta"	Padilla	4:08
14.	"Sueña"	Padilla	4:41
15.	"Nada Es Igual"	Alanis	5:04
16.	"El Poder de tus Manos"	Padilla	8:48

=== DVD track listing ===
The track listing from Allmusic.

No.	Title	Writer(s)	Length
1.	"Coqueta"	Padilla
2.	"Sueña"	Padilla
3.	"Nada Es Igual"	Alanis
4.	"El Poder de tus Manos"	Padilla

== Credits ==
The information from Allmusic.

- René Martínez — Producer, executive producer
- Ricky Muñoz — Producer, executive producer
- Jack Saenz — Mastering, mixing, digital imaging
- Miguel Trujillo — Executive Producer
- Roger Bresnahan — Executive producer
- Gerard Bustos — Recording assistant
- Oscar Carrasco — Executive producer
- Gibby Cevallos — Executive producer
- Bryan Bankovich — Technical director
- Tom Zimmerman — Audio Supervisor
- James Bulka — Engineer
- Mickey Cevallos — Director, executive producer, photography
- Elmer Flores — Camera operator
- Bradley Fox — Producer
- David Freidman — Photography director
- Gretta Gamez — Mastering, mixing
- Tomas Garcia — Coordination
- Nelson Gonzalez — Art direction
- Malcolm Harper — Engineer, recording
- Héctor H kron — Post production Supervisor-Editor
- Intocable — Arranger
- Israel Juarbe — Editing, camera operator
- Matt Nichols — Assistant art director
- Paul Olivarri — Art direction, digital imaging, guest appearance
- Carlos Cabral Jr. — Guest appearance
- Adrian G. Gonzalez — Guest appearance
- Javier Ramirez — Guest appearance
- Johnny Lee Rosas — Guest appearance
- Megan Taylor — Intern

== Chart performance ==
Chart (2004)	Peak position
US Billboard Top Latin Albums	1
US Billboard Regional/Mexican Albums	1
US Billboard 200	151

== Sales and certifications ==
Region	Certification	Certified units/sales
Mexico (AMPROFON)	2× Platinum	200,000^{^}
United States (RIAA)	Platinum (Latin)	100,000^{^}
^{^} Shipments figures based on certification alone.
