= Sueños (Intocable album) =

Studio album by Intocable
- Released: April 9, 2002
- Genre: Tejano, northeastern norteño
- Label: EMI Latin
- Producer: Ricky Muñoz, René Martínez

Intocable chronology
Es Para Tí (2000)	Sueños (2002)	La Historia (2003)

Singles from Sueños
- 1. "Sueña (Balad version)" Released: February 13, 2003

Sueños (English: Dreams) is the eighth studio album released by regional Mexican band Intocable. This album became their first number-one set on the Billboard Top Latin Albums chart for 4 weeks and received a nomination for a Grammy Award for Best Mexican/Mexican-American Album.

It won the 2003 Tejano Music Award for Album of the Year – Tejano.

== Track listing ==
The track listing from Billboard.com

1. Sueña (Luis Padilla) — 4:16
2. Vuelve (Luis Padilla) — 3:48
3. Te Sigo Amando (Aarón "La Pantera" Martínez) — 3:33
4. Jamás Te Dije (Josué Contreras) — 3:38
5. Muy a Tu Manera (Ricky Muñoz/Josué Contreras) — 2:59
6. Alguien Como Tú (Oswaldo Villarreal) — 3:40
7. Desolación (Luis Padilla) — 3:43
8. Mas Débil Que Tú (Luis Padilla) — 4:03
9. El Poder de Tus Manos (Luis Padilla) — 3:03
10. Si Te Vas (Marco Antonio Pérez) — 4:23
11. ¿En Qué Fallamos? (Oscar Treviño) — 3:09
12. Nada Es Igual (Eduardo Alanis) — 3:32
13. Voy a Extrañarte (Josué Contreras) — 4:07
14. Más Que un Sueño (José Roberto Martínez) — 2:52
15. Cómo Te Extraño! (Miguel Mendoza) — 3:13

== Credits ==
The information form Allmusic.

- Ricky Muñoz: Accordion, vocals, producer
- René Martínez: Producer, drums, vocals
- Intocable: Arranger
- Miguel Trujillo: Executive producer
- Gilbert Velasquez: Engineer
- Chente Barrera: vocals
- Sara Castillo: Text revision
- José Juan Hernández: Rhythms
- Sergio Serna: percussion
- Félix G. Salinas: Bass
- Daniel Sánchez: Vocals, bajo sexto
- José Quintero: Photography
- Nelson González: Graphic design, art direction
- Norma Vivanco: A&R
- Celeste Zendejas: Production assistant

== Chart performance ==
Chart (2000)	Peak position
US Billboard Top Latin Albums	1
US Billboard Regional/Mexican Albums	1
US Billboard 200	131

== Sales and certifications ==
Region	Certification	Certified units/sales
Mexico (AMPROFON)	Platinum	150,000^{^}
United States (RIAA)	2× Platinum (Latin)	200,000^{^}
^{^} Shipments figures based on certification alone.
