= Necesito Más de Ti =

Studio album by Duelo
- Released: January 29, 2009
- Genre: Norteño
- Label: Fonovisa
- Producer: Dimas López Jr.

Duelo chronology
Historia de Valientes (2008)	Necesito Más de Ti (2009)

Necesito Más de Ti ("I Need More Of You") is a studio album by Regional Mexican band Duelo. This album became their first number-one set on the Billboard Top Latin Albums chart.

== Track listing ==
The track listing from Billboard.

No.	Title	Writer(s)	Length
1.	"Necesito Más de Ti"	Oscar Ivan Treviño, Eduardo Alanis	2:41
2.	"A Veces"	Treviño	2:59
3.	"Mía"	Treviño	2:40
4.	"Juego Peligroso"	Miguel Mendoza	3:40
5.	"Pobre Loco"	Treviño	2:38
6.	"Sentimientos de Cartón"	Marco A. Pérez	3:03
7.	"Abrazame Vida"	Rey Rodríguez, Treviño	2:36
8.	"Regresa Cuando Quieras"	Treviño	2:52
9.	"El Día Menos Pensado"	Rodríguez, Treviño	3:00
10.	"Cuando Tuve Ganas"	Teodoro Bello	2:46
11.	"Llueve de Noche"	Treviño	2:38
12.	"Esto No Es Amor"	Treviño	3:53

== Charts ==
=== Weekly charts ===
Chart (2009)	Peak position
US Billboard 200	88
US Top Latin Albums (Billboard)	1
US Regional Mexican Albums (Billboard)	1

=== Year-end charts ===
Chart (2009)	Position
US Top Latin Albums (Billboard)	48
