= Borrón y Cuenta Nueva =

Studio album by Grupo Montéz de Durango
- Released: May 2, 2006
- Genre: Duranguense
- Label: D Disa

Grupo Montéz de Durango chronology
Y Sigue La Mata Dando (2005)	Borrón y Cuenta Nueva (2006)	Adiós A Mi Amante y Muchos Exitos Más (2006)

Alternative cover
- CD/DVD Edition

Borrón y Cuenta Nueva (Eng.: Start from Scratch) is the title of a studio album released by duranguense ensemble Grupo Montéz de Durango. This album became their third number-one set on the Billboard Top Latin Albums.

== Track listing ==
The information from Billboard and Allmusic.

=== CD track listing ===
No.	Title	Writer(s)	Length
1.	"Para Tí Con Amor [Ranchera]"	Anibal Pastor	3:12
2.	"La Borracha [Ranchera]"	Nui Vargas	2:42
3.	"Que Vuelva [Ranchera]"	Marco Antonio Solís	3:38
4.	"Hasta La Última Lágrima [Ranchera/Valseada]"	Edgar Cortázar, Adrián Pieragostino, José Luis Terrazas	3:25
5.	"Adiós Mi Amante [Ranchera]"	Jaime Velázquez	3:11
6.	"El Ahuichote [Corrido]"	Enrique Samaniego	3:09
7.	"El Cerro de La Silla [Shottis]"	Antonio Tanguma	2:42
8.	"Me Duele Escuchar Tu Nombre [Ranchera]"	Cortázar, Pieragostino, Terrazas	3:54
9.	"Las Cuatro Velas [Ranchera/Valseada]"	Víctor Rafael Cordero	3:27
10.	"Brindando a Diario [Cumbia]"	Refugio "Cuco" Escaleras	2:44
11.	"La Polkita Duranguense [Polka]"	Jorge Baquelos, Terrazas	2:35

=== DVD track listing ===
No.	Title	Writer(s)	Length
1.	Untitled	Velázquez	3:11
2.	Untitled		3:12
4.	Untitled		3:199
5.	"El Cerro de la Silla"	Tanguma	2:42

== Chart performance ==
Chart (2006)	Peak position
US Billboard Top Latin Albums	1
US Billboard Regional/Mexican Albums	1
US Billboard 200	66

== Sales and certifications ==
Region	Certification	Certified units/sales
United States (RIAA)	2× Platinum (Latin)	200,000^{^}
^{^} Shipments figures based on certification alone.
