= Agárrese =

Studio album by Grupo Montéz de Durango
- Released: July 3, 2007
- Genre: Duranguense
- Label: D Disa
- Producer: José Luis Terraza (executive producer)

Grupo Montéz de Durango chronology
En Directo desde México a Guatemala (2007)	Agárrese (2007)	Vida Mafiosa (2008)

Agárrese (Eng.: Hang On) is the title of a studio album released by duranguense ensemble Grupo Montéz de Durango. This album became their fifth number-one set on the Billboard Top Latin Albums.

== Track listing ==
The information from Billboard.

No.	Title	Writer(s)	Length
1.	"El Hijo del Amor"	Darío Gómez Zapata	2:18
2.	"Chuy y Mauricio"	José Ontiveros Meza	2:20
3.	"El Chivo Pelón"	Aldo Mau	2:39
4.	"Bachata Rosa"	Juan Luis Guerra	3:35
5.	"Dónde Está"	Omar Geles	3:21
6.	"Etapas de Mi Vida"	Jesús Armenta	3:16
7.	"Lágrimas del Corazón"	Pepe Sosa	3:47
8.	"Chaparrita"	José Garza	2:28
9.	"Ujule"	Ramón Ortega Contreras	2:25
10.	"La Banda Dominguera"	Jorge Carlos Portunato	1:55
11.	"Como en Los Buenos Tiempos"	Edgar Cortazar, José Luis Terrazas, Adrian Pieragostino	3:10
12.	"Me Duele Escuchar Tu Nombre"	Cortazar, Terrazas, Pieragostino	3:36

== Chart performance ==
Chart (2007)	Peak position
Mexico AMPROFON Album Chart	48
US Billboard Top Latin Albums	1
US Billboard Regional Mexican Albums	1
US Billboard 200	41

Year-End Charts

Chart (2007)	Peak position
US Billboard Top Latin Albums Year-End Charts	22
US Billboard Top Regional Mexican Albums Year-End Charts	4

== Sales and certifications ==
Region	Certification	Certified units/sales
United States (RIAA)	2× Platinum (Latin)	200,000^{^}
^{^} Shipments figures based on certification alone.
