= Duelo =

Norteño band

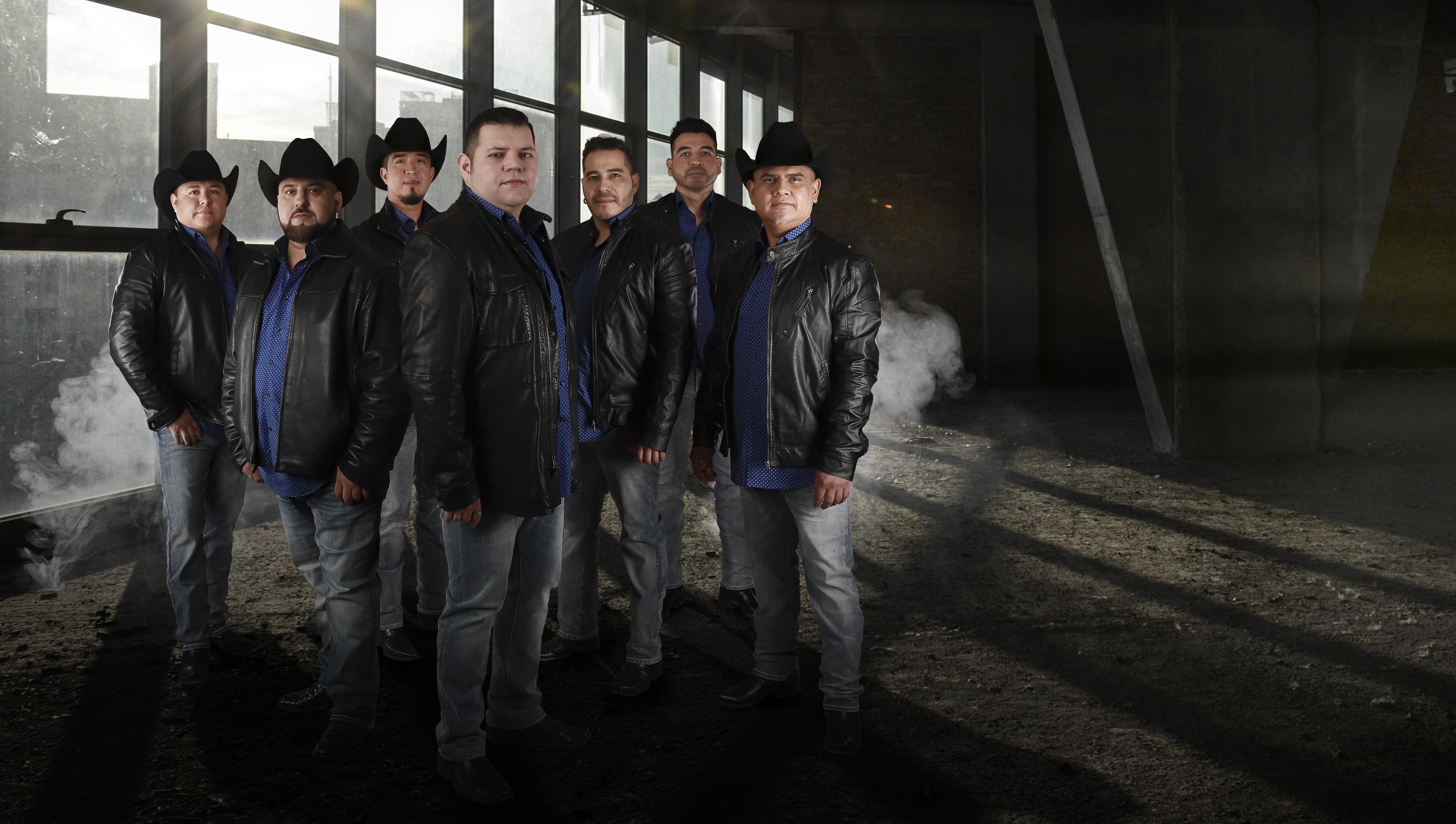
- Duelo in 2022

Background information
- Origin: Roma, Texas, United States
- Genres: Northeastern Norteño, Tejano
- Years active: 1998–present
- Label: La Bonita Music LLC
- Members: Óscar Iván Treviño; Dimas López; Pedro Flores; Iván Torres; David Badillo; Andy Pruneda; Jose Francisco "Pakito" Hernández
- Past members: Luis Jose Guerra; Juan Barrera; Edgar Rodriguez; Horlando Diaz; Christian Rivera; Angel Mario Peña; Jose Luis Ayala Jr.; Mauricio Cano
- Website: Official Website

Duelo "El Desafio Musical" is a Mexican norteño band from Roma, Texas, United States. The band is also known as Grupo Duelo and originally known as Duelo Norteño. The group rose to prominence in the early 2000s and continues to record to the present day.

In 2009, Necesito Más de Ti debuted at No. 1 on the Billboard Top Latin Albums and Regional Mexican Albums charts. In 2010, their album Solamente Tú also debuted at No. 1 on both charts. In 2003, Billboard magazine said, "Duelo's tunes describe feelings of puppy love or youthful optimism".

== Discography ==
=== Studio albums ===
As Duelo Norteño

- Si acaso me escuchas (1998) (Debut album)
- Duelo Norteño (1999) (This album and its successor contain songs from "Si acaso me escuchas" plus unreleased tracks)
- Duelo Norteño II (1999)

As Duelo

- El amor no acaba (2002) (First album on Fonovisa Records)
- Desde Hoy (2003)
- Para Sobrevivir (2004)
- En el área de sueños (2005)
- Relaciones Conflictivas (2006)
- En las manos de un ángel (2007)
- Historia de Valientes (2008)
- Necesito más de ti (2009)
- Solamente Tú (2010)
- Por una mujer bonita: Corridos y Canciones (2010)
- Vuela Muy Alto (2011) (Last album on Fonovisa Records)
- Libre por naturaleza (2013) (First album on La Bonita Music)
- Navidad desde el meritito Norte (2014)
- Veneno (2015)
- Eres Vida (2020)
- No Digas no (2022)
- Nostalgia (Late 2022)

=== Compilation and live albums ===
- Mi Historia Musical (2004)
- En Vivo Desde Monterrey (2005) (Live album)
- Houston Rodeo Live! (2008) (Live album)
- Solo Hits (2008)
- On Tour (2009) (Live album)
- Vive Grupero 2010:El Concierto (2010) (Live album)
- 20 Kilates (2014)

== Members ==
Current Members

- Oscar Ivan Treviño – Bajo Sexto, Lead Vocals (2002 – present)
- Dimas Lopez Jr. – Accordion (2002 – present)
- Pedro Flores "El Chino" – Bass, Second Voice (2007 – present)
- David Badillo – Güiro (2013 – present)
- Ivan Torres – Drums (2013 – present)
- Andy Pruneda – Percussion (2015 – present)
- Jose Francisco "Pakito" Hernandez – Bajo Sexto, Second Voice (2016 – present)

Former Members

- Luis Jose Guerra – Güiro, Second Voice (2002–2006)
- Juan Barrera – Drums (2002–2007)
- Edgar Rodriguez – Percussion (2002–2007)
- Christian Rivera – Bass, Second Voice (2002–2009)
- Angel Mario Peña – Güiro (2006–2013)
- Jose Luis Ayala Jr. – Drums (2007–2013)
- Mauricio Cano – Percussion (2007–2015)
