= Crossroads: Cruce de Caminos =

Studio album by Intocable
- Released: October 24, 2006
- Genre: Northeastern Norteño, Tejano, Texas Country
- Label: EMI International
- Producer: Lloyd Maines, René Martínez

Intocable chronology
Diez (2005)	Crossroads: Cruce de Caminos (2006)	Llévame Contigo (2007)

Alternative cover
- Fan Edition cover

Professional ratings
Review scores
Source	Rating
Allmusic	4.5/5 stars

Crossroads: Cruce de Caminos is the title of a studio album released by regional Mexican band Intocable. This album became their fourth number-one set on the Billboard Top Latin Albums, and was released in a standard CD presentation, CD/DVD combo including bonus materials and a Fan Edition with an extra track.

== Track listing ==
The track listing from Billboard.com

=== CD and CD/DVD ===
No.	Title	Writer(s)	Length
1.	"Por Ella (Poco a Poco)"	Luis "Louie" Padilla	4:03
2.	"Te Lo Juro"	Aaron "La Pantera" Martínez	4:17
3.	"Vuelve Mi Amor"	Padilla	3:47
4.	"Libertad"	Josue Martínez	3:24
5.	"Basto"	Miguel Mendoza	3:38
6.	"Te Extraño"	Valentino	4:06
7.	"Ya No Puedo Cambiar Mi Vida"	Padilla	3:10
8.	"Qué Esperabas"	Padilla	2:56
9.	"La Palabra Amor"	Josué Contreras	3:21
10.	"Dame Un Besito"	Valentino	3:48
11.	"Te Necesito"	Martínez	2:25
12.	"Volví a Quedarme Solo"	Padilla	3:31
13.	"Por Ella [Pop]"	Padilla	4:13
14.	"Nada Es Igual"	Marco Antonio Solís	3:06
15.	"Mirándote"	María José Ospino	3:59
16.	"Lo Que Callas"	Reyli Barba, Chuy Flores	3:44

=== Fan Edition ===
On October 23, 2007 a Fan Edition was released with the same track list and a new song titled "Me Faltas Tú" and bonus features.

No.	Title	Writer(s)	Length
17.	"Me Faltas Tú"	Padilla	3:55
18.	"Main Program [Multimedia track]"
19.	"Dame Un Besito/La Palabra Amor/Qué Esperabas/Yo No Puedo Cambiar Mi Vida"	Padilla, Valentino
20.	"Dame Un Besito/Por Ella (Poco a Poco)"	Padilla, Valentino
21.	"On the Road"
22.	"Producers interview [multimedia track]"	Padilla, Valentino

== Personnel ==
This information from Allmusic.

- Lloyd Maines — Acoustic guitar, dobro, pedal steel, arranger, producer, guest appearance, mixing
- René Martínez — Producer, executive producer, mixing, drums, group member
- Nicolas Barry — Piano, project coordinator, guest appearance
- Alan Baxter — Executive producer, project coordinator
- Brian Beken — Fiddle, guest appearance
- Junior Cabral — Banjo, mandolin, arranger, guest appearance
- Mickey Cevallos — Photography
- Cory Churko — Fiddle, guest appearance
- José Ángel Farías — Mixing, group member
- Marco Gamboa — Piano, Hammond organ, engineer, guest appearance
- José Angel González — Mixing, group member
- Jose Juan Hernandez — Rhythm, mixing, animation, group member
- Tomas Jacobi — Project coordinator
- John Karpowich — Engineer
- Marc Muller — Acoustic guitar, mandolin, pedal steel, lap steel guitar, guest appearance
- Paul Olivarri — Production coordination
- Marco A. Ramírez — Mastering
- Silvestre Rodríguez — Mixing, group member
- Johnny Lee Rosas — Bass, mixing, vocals, group member
- Jack Saenz — Engineer, mixing
- Félix G. Salinas — Electric bass, mixing, group member
- Daniel Sánchez — Bass, mixing, segundo, group member
- Sergio Serna — Percussion, group member
- Danny Reisch — Engineer
- Matt Serrechio — Assistant engineer
- John Silva — Engineer, guest appearance
- Esteban Villanueva — Project coordinator

== Chart performance ==
Chart (2006)	Peak position
US Billboard Top Latin Albums	1
US Billboard Regional/Mexican albums	1
US Billboard 200	59

Year-End Charts

Chart (2007)	Peak position
US Billboard Top Latin Albums	45
US Billboard Regional/Mexican albums	14

== Sales and certifications ==
Region	Certification	Certified units/sales
Mexico (AMPROFON)	Platinum	100,000^{^}
^{^} Shipments figures based on certification alone.
