= Banda Los Recoditos =

Mexican Banda formed in Mazatlán, Sinaloa

- Banda Los Recoditos at the 2026 Latin Grammy Awards

Background information
- Origin: Mexico
- Genre: Banda
- Years active: 1989–present
- Labels: Discos Musart (1990-1998); Sony Music (2001); Fonovisa(2004-2007, 2014-); Disa (2010–2013)
- Members: Jesus Quiroz; Santos De Jesús ‘Jeypi’ Pérez Roque; Poché Urías; Efraín Osuna; Orlando Castillo; Marco "Zapata" Figueroa; Daniel Velazco; Jair Avilés; Freddy Alvarado; Kevin Talledos López; Oracio Nieves; Brayan Ramirez; Brahiton González; José Moisés Payan Herrera; Francisco Velarde; Brayam Alvarado Orozco
- Past members: Alfonso Lizárraga Pancho Barraza; Chayo De La Lola; Luis Fernando Muñoz(+); Carlos Sarabia Roberto Pérez Lizárraga (Roberto Jr.) Luis Ángel “el flaco” Franco; Esteban Moreno Carrillo; Eduardo Loaiza Cruz Lizárraga Osuna
- Website: www.bandalosrecoditos.com.mx

Banda Los Recoditos is a Mexican banda formed in Mazatlán, Sinaloa. It was founded in 1989 by friends and family members of Banda El Recodo by Cruz Lizárraga. Alfonso Lizárraga and Pancho Barraza, the first vocalists, were two of the more than dozen bandmembers comprising the original incarnation of the band. After releasing several albums, in 2010 the band released their album ¡Ando Bien Pedo!, featuring the single of the same title, which became a number-one hit in the Billboard Hot Latin Songs chart.

== Style ==
The music of Los Recoditos is like most Sinaloan bandas, featuring vocalists harmonizing to a third and high horn hits in the background. The band often uses the I-vi-IV-V chord progression (known by the 50s Progression). The meter is usually a 3-4 or a 4-4, but 6-8 or a hemiola between 3-4 and 6-8 is not uncommon.

== Discography ==
- A Bailar de Caballito (1990) (First Album with Linda Records)
- Lola la Bailera (1990)
- Las Rejas No Matan (1991)
- Tu Abandono (1992)
- Un Sólo Cielo (1993)
- Adiós Amor (1994)
- Volumen 4 (1995)
- Canto Para Ti (1995)
- Siempre Te Voy a Recordar (1996)
- El Nylon (1997)
- Oye Amigo (1996)
- Banda Sinaloense Los Recoditos (1997)
- Y Todavia Hay Amor (1998) (Last album on Musart)
- Como La Primera Vez (2001) (Only album on Sony Music)
- Puras Romanticas (2004)
- Si No Existieras (2004) (First album on Fonovisa)
- En Acción (2005)
- Dos Enamorados (2005)
- Vengo a Decirte (2007) (Last album on Fonovisa)
- Y Seguimos Enamorados (2009)
- ¡Ando Bien Pedo! (2010)
- A Toda Madre (2011)
- Para Ti Solita (2012)
- El Free (2013)
- Sueño XXX (2014)
- Mas Sueños XXX (2015)
- Me Está Gustando (2016)
- Los Gustos Que Me Doy (2017)
- Perfecta (2019)
- 30 Aniversario (2020)
- Vivir La Vida (2021)
- Me Siento a Todo Dar (2022)
- ¿En Qué Les Molesta? (2023)
- Y ¿Qué Tiene? (2024)
- Se Pronostican Borracheras (2025)
