= Grupo Montéz de Durango =

Regional Mexican band

Montéz de Durango
- Genres: Duranguense
- Years active: 1996–present
- Label: Cruz de Piedra Music
- Members: José Luis Terrazas 1996-Present; Daniel Terrazas 1998-Present; José Luis Terrazas Jr. 2001-Present; Fabián Muro 2005-Present; Cristian Terrazas 2015-Present; César Ruelas 2003-2005, 2011-2013, 2016-2018, 2024-Present; José Portillo Robles 2020-Present; Jonathan Villagómez 2021-Present; Rafael Castañón 2022-Present; Tony Saucedo 2023-Present Former members: José García Guerrero 1996-1997; Miguel Bolivar+ 1996-1998; Alfredo Ramírez Corral 1996-2005; Ismael Mijares 1996-2005; Rafael Solís 1997-2002; Simón Valtierrez 1999-2002; Jesús Duarte 2002; Armando Aguirre 2003-2005; Francisco López 2003-2005, 2009-2014; Beto Terrazas+ 2004-2005, 2020-2021; Fernando "Beethoven" Ramírez 2005-2006; Manuel Ortega 2005-2007; Jorge Bañuelos 2005-2007; Moisés Arellanes 2005-2011; Jesús "Chugar" García 2006-2015; Gonzalo Villaseñor 2006-2011; Sergio Reséndez 2007-2008; Javier Guzmán 2007-2014; Gersain García 2008-2012; Carlos Galaviz 2008; Adán García Martínez 2008; Kevin Estrada 2011-2024; Ricky Estrada 2013-2016; Enrique Facio "El Pollo" 2014-2022; Aarón Lechuga 2015; Abel Pérez 2015-2017; Bobby Sígala 2015-2021; Marco Recéndez 2017-2024
- Website: http://www.montezdedurango.net

Grupo Montéz de Durango or Montéz de Durango is a regional Mexican band that specializes in the duranguense genre. They are based in Aurora, Illinois, and are well known in the United States, Mexico and Central America.

== History ==
José Luis Terrazas founded Grupo Montéz de Durango in 1996. Terrazas, who was born in Durango, Mexico, grew up in Chicago and was a percussionist in the marching band at his high school. He hooked up with a traditional Mexican banda and learned that these groups were very popular in Chicago. The next step was the formation of his own group.

The seven-member group soon became a popular draw at local dance halls. Terrazas was influenced by Tierra Caliente group La Dinastía de Tuzantla. Membership in the group includes leader José Luis Terrazas, Daniel Terrazas (drummer and son), José Luis Terrazas Jr. (hype man) and other musicians. Besides covers of older traditional Mexican songs, the group played a faster-paced style of music: a polka-ranchera mix. This musical style became associated with the dance style called "El Pasito Duranguense" (The Durango Step) and Grupo Montéz de Durango was the band most closely identified with it. Terrazas founded his own Terrazas Records label and the band began recording and releasing albums.

In time, one of the major labels signed the group, but the label wanted the group to change its sound and they soon parted ways. The group signed with a Mexican independent label and released El Sube y Baja in 2002. The band's next release followed in 2003, and De Durango a Chicago debuted at No. 2 on the Top Latin Albums chart. A live album, En Vivo Desde Chicago (with a DVD), was released early in 2004. A year later, Y Sigue La Mata Dando was released and in 2006.

The group fractured that same year with several members, including vocalist Alfredo Ramírez Corral, breaking away to form their own group, Los Creadorez del Pasito Duranguense de Alfredo Ramírez. Montez de Durango re-grouped, replenished their ranks, and released a new studio album, Borrón y Cuenta Nueva, which won a Billboard Award for Album Of the Year in the summer of 2007, showing doubters they were stronger than ever. They also released two albums in 2008, Vida Mafiosa in March and Nosotros Somos in October.

In 2010, they came back with a new studio album, Con Estilo... Chicago Style, debuting at No. 1 on the charts and with a new tour, Mi Necesidad Tour 2010. The band followed this release with the hit Descuide on the 2012 MMXII album. On this album, Móntez de Durango also filmed a music video with a special guest appearance from José José on the second single He Renunciado a Ti.

In spring 2014, Montéz de Durango launched a self-released compilation album Montéz de Durango: Presenta. The label Cruz de Piedra is owned by José Luis Terrazas and featured label artists Norteñisimo Zierra Azul & Rey Román for the compilation. This album launched six music videos for the album gaining over three million views in all.

On February 18, 2016, Móntez de Durango launched the album De Vuelta a La Sierra. In interviews, the band mentioned how proud they were with this release because it is an album that goes back to the roots of the group's music. "De Vuelta a La Sierra" is a "Cruz de Piedra" production.

In 2017, they released a new album with the Remex Music label with the name Sin Cambiar el Estilo from which the singles Como Quieren que la Olvide, Cuatro Rosas, and Como Cuento de Hadas were released.

In 2018, the album Arriba La Sierra was released with 10 songs, including a ballad titled Tú Sin Mí and also includes a cover of one of the most recognized hits of singer-songwriter Marco Antonio Solís entitled Mi Mayor Sacrificio.

== Discography ==
- 1997 Rama Seca
  - 1. Rama Seca
  - 2. Me Persigue Tu Sombra
  - 3. Sigue José, Ramon y María
  - 4. Todos Lloramos
  - 5. Paloma Herrante
  - 6. Santiago Papasquiaro
  - 7. Ingrata Mujer
  - 8. Me Duele
  - 9. Tus Mentiras
  - 10. Tu y la Mentira
- 1998 Tu Mirada
  - 1. La Novia del Pajarillo
  - 2. Señora Enamorada
  - 3. Poquito a Poco
  - 4. Tu Mirada
  - 5. Nomas Las Mujeres Quedan
  - 6. Una Noche Serena y Obscura
  - 7. El Obscuro de la Vara
  - 8. Paloma Sin Nido
  - 9. En Donde Estarás
  - 10. Te Necesito Tanto Amor
- 1999 La Ausencia
  - 1. La Ausencia
  - 2. Se Les Pelo Baltazar
  - 3. Tú Me Has Cambiado
  - 4. Ezequiel Rodríguez
  - 5. Los 500 Novillos
  - 6. Como un Pájaro Errante
  - 7. Temporada en la Sierra
  - 8. Solo Amigos
  - 9. Lastima Es Mi Mujer
  - 10. El 4 Negro
- 2000 Los Primos de Baltazar
  - 1. Los Laureles
  - 2. El Moreno
  - 3. Tres Ramitas
  - 4. Macario Leyva
  - 5. La Hierba Se Movía
  - 6. Flor del Río
  - 7. Los Primos de Baltazar
  - 8. Al Despertar
  - 9. La Rafailita
  - 10. Estoy Enamorado
- 2001 Con Sabor a Tamborazo
  - 1. Catarino y los Rurales
  - 2. Clave 7
  - 3. La Revolcada
  - 4. Carne Quemada
  - 5. Bailando en la Sierra
  - 6. Camino a Tepehuanes
  - 7. Las Mulas de Garame
  - 8. La Pava
  - 9. Liborio Cano
  - 10. La Milpa
- 2002 Sube y Baja
  - 1. El Sube y Baja
  - 2. Las Mismas Piedras
  - 3. Bachi Polka
  - 4. Recordando a Durango
  - 5. Hilarió Carrillo
  - 6. De la Cintura para Abajo-Palomo
  - 7. Mi Gusto Es
  - 8. El Verde Pinito
  - 9. Pasito Duranguense
  - 10. Hoy Empieza Mi Tristeza
  - 11. Lino Rodarte
  - 12. Baraja de Oro-Palomo
- 2003 De Durango a Chicago
  - 1. Lagrimas de Cristal
  - 2. Te Quise Olvidar
  - 3. Vengo a Buscarte
  - 4. Ignacio Parra
  - 5. Colonia Hidalgo, Durango Querido
  - 6. Hoy Empieza Mi Tristeza-Versión Pop
  - 7. El Huérfano
  - 8. En Otros Tiempos
  - 9. De Durango a Chicago
  - 10. Los Dos Hermanos Rivales
  - 11. El Hijo Ausente (ft. Hector Montemayor)
  - 12. Hoy Empieza Mi Tristeza-Versión Norteño
- 2004 En Vivo Desde Chicago
  - 1. El Sube y Baja (Live)
  - 2. Lagrimas de Cristal (Live)
  - 3. El Verde Pinito (Live)
  - 4. En Otros Tiempos (Live)
  - 5. Pasito Duranguense (Live)
  - 6. Las Mismas Piedras (Live)
  - 7. Hoy Empieza Mi Tristeza (Live)
  - 8. Llegando a Zacatecas (Live)
  - 9. La Revolcada (Live)
  - 10. Camino a Tepehuanes (Live)
  - 11. El Huérfano (Live)
  - 12. Lino Rodarte (Live)
  - 13. Colonia Hidalgo, Durango Querido (Live)
  - 14. Hoy Empieza Mi Tristeza-Versión Norteño (Live)
- 2005 Y Sigue La Mata Dando
  - 1. Vestida de Color de Rosa
  - 2. Puro Durango
  - 3. Contrabando en Juárez
  - 4. De Esta Sierra a la Otra Sierra
  - 5. Adiós Amor Te Vas
  - 6. Solo Deje Yo a Mi Padre
  - 7. Seis Renglones
  - 8. Me Llamas
  - 9. Te Voy a Esperar
  - 10. Una Lágrima
  - 11. Quiero Saber de Ti
  - 12. Lastima Es Mi Mujer
  - 13. Esperanzas
  - 14. La Historia
- 2005 VIVE (Bonus Tracks)
  - 1. Camino a Tepehuanes
  - 2. Clave 7
  - 3. Las Mulas de Garame
  - 4. Liborio Cano
  - 5. Bailando en la Sierra
  - 6. Carne Quemada
  - 7. Catarino y los Rurales
  - 8. La Pava
  - 9. La Milpa
  - 10. La Revolcada
  - 11. Ven Conmigo
  - 12. Llegando a Zacatecas
  - 13. Esta Triste Guitarra
- 2006 500 Novillos
  - 1. Ausencia Eterna
  - 2. 4 de Octubre
  - 3. Santiago Papasquiaro
  - 4. La Musita
  - 5. 500 Novillos
  - 6. Temporada en La Sierra
  - 7. Tú Me Has Cambiado
  - 8. Se Les Pelo Baltazar
  - 9. Solo Amigos
  - 10. Ezequiel Rodríguez
  - 11. Como un Pájaro Herrante
  - 12. Lastima Es Mi Mujer (Cumbia)
- 2006 Los Súper Corridos
  - 1. Se Les Pelo Baltazar
  - 2. Clave 7
  - 3. Ignacio Parra
  - 4. Los dos Hermanos Rivales
  - 5. Lino Rodarte
  - 6. Temporada en La Sierra
  - 7. Ezequiel Rodríguez
  - 8. Contrabando en Juárez
  - 9. 500 Novillos
  - 10. 4 de Octubre
  - 11. Liborio Cano
  - 12. Catarino y los Rurales
- 2006 Borrón y Cuenta Nueva
  - 1. Para Ti Con Amor
  - 2. La Borracha
  - 3. Que Vuelva
  - 4. Hasta la Última Lagrima
  - 5. Adiós a Mi Amante
  - 6. El Ahuichote
  - 7. El Cerro de la Silla
  - 8. Me Duele Escuchar Tu Nombre
  - 9. Las Cuatro Velas
  - 10. Brindando a Diario
  - 11. La Polkita Duranguense
- 2006 Puro Tamborazo al Estilo
  - 1. Cándido Rodríguez
  - 2. Catarino y los Rurales
  - 3. China de los Ojos Negros
  - 4. De Esta Sierra a la Otra Sierra
  - 5. El Novillo Despuntado
  - 6. La Cabrona
  - 7. El Corrido de Los Perez
  - 8. Paloma Errante
  - 9. Santiago Papasquiaro
  - 10. Te Vas Ángel Mío
- 2007 Agárrese
  - 1. El Hijo del Amor
  - 2. Chuy y Mauricio
  - 3. El Chivo Pelón
  - 4. Bachata Rosa
  - 5. Donde Esta
  - 6. Etapas de Mi Vida
  - 7. Lagrimas del Corazón
  - 8. Chaparrita
  - 9. Ujule
  - 10. La Banda Dominguera
  - 11. Como en Los Buenos Tiempos
  - 12. Me Duele Escuchar Tu Nombre-Versión Balada
- 2007 En Directo de México a Guatemala
  - 1. Lagrimillas Tontas (Live)
  - 2. Donde Esta (Live)
  - 3. Me Duele Escuchar Tu Nombre (Live)
  - 4. El Chivo Pelón (Live)
  - 5. Quiero Saber de Ti (Live)
  - 6. Adiós a Mi Amante (Live)
  - 7. Solo Deje Yo a Mi Padre (Live)
  - 8. Que Vuelva (Live)
  - 9. Lastima Es Mi Mujer (Live)
  - 10. El Diablo en Una Botella (Live)
  - 11. Esperanzas (Live)
  - 12. La Piojosa
- 2008 Vida Mafiosa
  - 1. El Federal de Zacatecas
  - 2. De Durango Hasta Chicago
  - 3. Dos Gallos de Oro
  - 4. El Cajoncito
  - 5. El General
  - 6. Está de Parranda el Jefe
  - 7. La Hummer de Culiacan
  - 8. La Imagen del Malverde
  - 9. Mi Último Contrabando
  - 10. Pascual Sarmiento
  - 11. Vida Mafiosa
- 2008 Nosotros Somos
  - 1. Espero
  - 2. Diez Kilómetros a Pie
  - 3. Hay Tristeza en Mis Ojos
  - 4. Bendito Cielo
  - 5. Cumbia del Río
  - 6. El Llanto de un Illegal
  - 7. Te Pido Perdón
  - 8. Lo Que Un Dia Fue No Será
  - 9. Disparame Dispara
  - 10. Corazón de Texas
  - 11. Porque Te Vas
  - 12. La Reina del Cielo
  - 13. La Mancha
- 2009 El Borracho
  - 1. El Borracho
  - 2. Vives en Mi Corazón
  - 3. Espero-Versión Villera
  - 4. Me Duele Escuchar Tu Nombre
  - 5. Adiós a Mi Amante
  - 6. Lagrimas del Corazón
  - 7. Cumbia del Río
  - 8. Como en Los Buenos Tiempos
  - 9. Etapas de Mi Vida
  - 10. El Llanto de Un Illegal
- 2010 Cerrando Trato (Corridos con Tuba)
  - 1. Cerrando Trato
  - 2. Hombre de Negocios
  - 3. Liborio Cano
  - 4. El Borracho
  - 5. El Piloto Suicida
  - 6. Rafa y su Primo
  - 7. Paseando y Tomando
  - 8. Elpidio Pasos
  - 9. La Autopista 15
  - 10. El Cuatro Negro
- 2010 Con Estilo...Chicago Style
  - 1. Montesitos
  - 2. Entre Verde y Azul
  - 3. Atrapado
  - 4. Mi Necesidad
  - 5. Flor de Mar
  - 6. Nacido y Creado
  - 7. No Quiero Saber de Ti
  - 8. Sabiendo Quien Era Yo
  - 9. El Farolito
  - 10. Que Triste es un Adios
- 2012 MMXII
  - 1. Descuide
  - 2. El Hijo Que No Volvió
  - 3. Tú Me Has Cambiado
  - 4. Contrabando del Paso
  - 5. Caprichosa María
  - 6. Me Equivoqué
  - 7. He Renunciado a Ti
  - 8. El Día de Tu Boda
  - 9. La Fuga del Rojo
  - 10. El Trailer Negro
  - 11. Deseo
  - 12. A Donde Aviento El Corazón
- 2014 Montez de Durango Presenta
  - 1. Fecha de Caducidad-Montéz de Durango
  - 2. Tuve (ft. Montéz de Durango)-Rey Roman
  - 3. El Moro de Tepehuanes-Norteñisimo Zierra Azul
  - 4. Nadie Me Verá Llorar-Montéz de Durango
  - 5. Todo Menos Tú-Rey Roman
  - 6. Mis Dos Vicios-Norteñisimo Zierra Azul
  - 7. Ni Borracho Te Olvido-Montéz de Durango
  - 8. Mi Cigarro-Rey Roman
  - 9. Mi Viejo Querido-Norteñisimo Zierra Azul
  - 10. Mirame-Rey Roman
  - 11. Te Deje Por Mala-Montéz de Durango
- 2016 De Vuelta a la Sierra
  - 1. Soy Duranguense
  - 2. Rama Seca
  - 3. El Pajarillo
  - 4. Nadie Me Verá Llorar
  - 5. Los Cañeros
  - 6. Las Mulas de Garame
  - 7. Mis Paisanos y Yo
  - 8. Polvorete
  - 9. El Padrino
  - 10. Hermosa Historia
  - 11. En Un Jaripeo
  - 12. Con Permiso
- 2017 Sin Cambiar el Estilo
  - 1. Por Infamias del Destino
  - 2. Como Quieren Que La Olvidé?
  - 3. Soy Como Soy
  - 4. Borrare Tu Nombre
  - 5. Ese Que Traes a Tu Lado
  - 6. Los Frijoles Bailan
  - 7. Privilegio
  - 8. Cuatro Rosas
  - 9. Como Cuento de Hadas
  - 10. Mis Tiempos Pasados
  - 11. Me Equivoqué
- 2018 Arriba la Sierra
  - 1. Se Te Olvido
  - 2. Imposible Olvidarte
  - 3. De Torreon a Lerdo
  - 4. Jinetes en El Cielo
  - 5. Mi Mayor Sacrificio
  - 6. La Yaquesita
  - 7. Canción del Mariachi
  - 8. Devuélveme Mi Libertad
  - 9. Tampico Hermoso
  - 10. Tu Sin Mi
- 2020 Puras pa' Bailar
  - 1. Baila Conmigo
  - 2. Chili Piquín
  - 3. Cuando Los Frijoles Bailan
  - 4. De Torreón a Lerdo
  - 5. Jinetes en El Cielo
  - 6. Tampico Hermoso
  - 7. Juan Colorado
  - 8. Canción del Mariachi
  - 9. La Yaquesita
  - 10. El Polvorete
  - 11. Cuatro Rosas
- 2021 Corridos Clásicos en Studio Vol. 1
  - 1. Clave 7
  - 2. Chuy y Mauricio
  - 3. Lino Rodarte
  - 4. Se Les Pelo Baltazar
  - 5. La Imagen de Malverde
  - 6. Macario Leyva
  - 7. 500 Novillos
  - 8. El 4 Negro
  - 9. Vida Mafiosa
  - 10. Mi Último Contrabando
- 2022 Con Sabor a Tamborazo Vol. 2
  - 1. Durango, Durango
  - 2. El Pájaro Prieto
  - 3. Caminos de Guanajuato
  - 4. El Frijolito
  - 5. Me Persigue Tu Sombra
  - 6. El Pavido Navido
  - 7. Caminos de Michoacán
  - 8. Lo Que Más Me Martiriza
  - 9. Nieves de Enero
  - 10. Como Extraño Mi Sierra (ft. Los Sembradores)
- 2024 Puras Pa'Bailar, Vol. 2: Cumbias, Charangas y Punta
  - 1. Amparito
  - 2. Bonita y Mentirosa
  - 3. Cariñito Sin Mi
  - 4. Se Me Perdió La Cadenita
  - 5. Golpe con Golpe
  - 6. Sopa de Caracol
  - 7. Lágrimas de Escharcha
  - 8. Muñeca Esquiva
  - 9. La Colegiala
  - 10. La Traicionera
- 2024 El Despegue, Vol. 1
  - 1. Ya Ni Me Acuerdo
  - 2. Yo No Sé Que Me Pasó
  - 3. Ezequiel Coronado
  - 4. De Esta Sierra a la Otra Sierra (ft. El As de La Sierra)
  - 5. Harpasito Duranguense
  - 6. Cobarde
  - 7. Mayonesa
- 2024 El Despegue, Vol. 2
  - 1. SORRY (Ft. La Maquinaria Norteña)
  - 2. Fulanito de Tal
  - 3. Cuando Te Encontré (Ft. Los Askis)
  - 4. Tengo Que Aprender
  - 5. Lo Que Más Me Duele (Ft. Ken-Y)
  - 6. Fue Un Juego
  - 7. Un Amor del Pasado

=== Singles ===
- 1997 Rama Seca
- 1998 Tu Mirada
- 1999 La Ausencia
- 2000 Los Primos de Baltazar
- 2000 La Hierba se Movía
- 2001 Catarino y los Rurales
- 2002 El Sube y Baja
- 2002 Las Mismas Piedras
- 2003 Hoy Empieza Mi Tristeza
- 2003 Lágrimas de Cristal
- 2003 El Huérfano
- 2004 Te Quise Olvidar
- 2004 Quiero Saber de Tí
- 2005 Sólo Dejé Yo a Mi Padre
- 2005 Adiós Amor Te Vas
- 2005 Esperanzas
- 2005 Lagrimillas Tontas
- 2006 Adiós A Mi Amante
- 2007 Que Vuelva
- 2007 Me Duele Escuchar Tu Nombre
- 2007 Lágrimas del Corazón
- 2007 La Piojosa
- 2008 Como en los Buenos Tiempos
- 2008 Etapas de Mi Vida
- 2008 Espero
- 2009 Lo Que Un Día Fue, No Será
- 2009 Porque Te Vas
- 2009 El Borracho
- 2010 Paseando y Tomando
- 2010 Mi Necesidad
- 2010 Que Triste es un Adios
- 2011 He Renunciado a Ti
- 2012 A Donde Aviento el Corazón
- 2012 Descuide
- 2013 Fecha de Caducidad
- 2013 Ni Borracho Te Olvido
- 2014 Nadie Me Verá llorar
- 2014 Con Permiso
- 2015 Los Cañeros
- 2015 Soy Duranguense
- 2016 Como Quieren Que La Olvide
- 2016 Mulas de Garame
- 2017 Por Infamias del Destino
- 2017 Cuatro Rosas
- 2017 Me Equivoque
- 2018 Imposible Olvidarte
- 2018 Tu Sin Mi
- 2018 Mi Mayor Sacrificio
- 2019 El Hijo Ausente
- 2020 Bajo El Cielo de Torreón
- 2020 La Mancha (feat. Los Potros)
- 2020 Vive (feat. Beto Terrazas)
- 2021 Vengo a Verte
- 2021 Tenme Fe
- 2021 Muñeca de Ojos de Miel
- 2021 Piensa Morena
- 2022 El Moro de Tepehuanes
- 2022 Fue Tan Poco Tu Cariño
- 2022 Como Extraño A Mi Sierra (ft. Los Sembradores)
- 2023 Hey, ¿Baby Que Pasó?
- 2023 Un Indio Quiere Llorar (ft. Banda Machos)
- 2023 Sueños de Un Ilegal (ft. Patrulla 81)
- 2023 Llorar Quedito & La Migra (ft. Grupo Mojado)
- 2023 Golpe con Golpe
- 2024 De Esta Sierra a la Otra Sierra (ft. El As de La Sierra)
- 2024 Cobarde
- 2024 Yo No Sé Que Me Pasó
- 2024 SORRY (ft. La Maquinaria Norteña)
