= Intocable =

American Tejano and Norteño band from Zapata, Texas

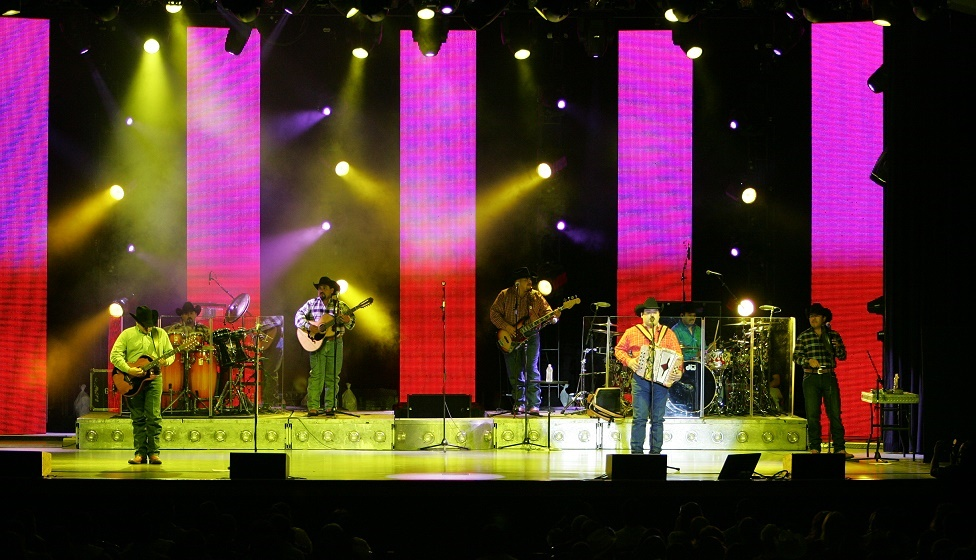
- Intocable at the Chumash Casino Resort in Santa Ynez, California on July 13, 2006

Background information
- Origin: Zapata, Texas, United States
- Genres: Northeastern Norteño, Tejano
- Years active: 1993–present
- Label: EMI Latin
- Members: Ricardo (Ricky) Muñoz; René Martínez; Sergio Serna; Johnny Lee Rosas; Alejandro (Alex) Gulmar; Felix Salinas; Nick Wells; José Ángel Farias(+); Silvestre Rodríguez(+); José Ángel González(+)
- Website: www.grupointocable.com

Intocable is an American band from Zapata, Texas, that plays regional Mexican music; specializing in norteño and tejano music. It was started by friends Ricardo Javier Muñoz and René Orlando Martínez in the early 1990s. In a few years, Intocable fused the genres Tejano and Norteño with a musical signature that fused Tejano's robust conjunto and Norteño folk rhythms with a pop balladry. Intocable is perhaps the most influential group in Tejano and their Tejano/Norteño fusion has become the blueprint for several Tejano bands. The group's style combines romantic, hooky melodies, tight instrumentation and vocal harmony.

== Career ==
Career accomplishments include four consecutive sold-out nights at Mexico City's prestigious Auditorio Nacional and the group's 2003 headlining appearance at Reliant Stadium in Houston, which drew a record 70,104 fans. They also play every year as tradition with two sold-out dates (lately three) at the 10,000-capacity Monterrey Arena in Monterrey, Mexico —an unusual accomplishment given that norteño groups typically play large dance halls and rarely arenas unless it is an all day festival event. Intocable has also won at least eight of Univision's Premio Lo Nuestro awards. They received their first Grammy win in February 2005 at the 47th Annual Grammys (Grammy Award for Best Mexican/Mexican-American Album; Intimamente) and second at the 53rd annual Grammys for their album Classic.

They were the first of their genre to play at Dallas Cowboys Stadium, at the halftime show of the 2011 Dallas Cowboys vs. Washington Redskins game, and also at The Greek Theatre in Los Angeles. They garnered two of the 5 nominations to the Billboard Regional Mexican Awards and got a nod for Best Norteño Album to the 2011 Latin Grammy for their album Intocable 2011. They were also nominated for a Grammy for the album. Intocable 2011 was released under the group's own music label Good-i Music and the first two singles, "Robarte Un Beso" and "Prometí", went to number 1 on US regional radio charts. The third single "Arrepientete" also did very well on radio and their fourth single "Llueve" was premiered live onstage at the 2012 Premio lo Nuestro where the group swept with all three categories they were nominated for.

On October 12, 2015, Intocable streamed a showcase that was viewed by more than 22,000 people worldwide. All proceeds were donated to St. Jude Children's Research Hospital to support children affected by cancer. The initiative #AyudaAyudar was created as part of this effort and has continued to organize events to raise funds.

On January 23, 2016, Intocable announced their partnership with St. Jude, a pledge first of its kind in the music industry. Today, their support not only creates awareness for the cause, but their pledge of support contributes to assure that families pay for nothing and can focus on letting their children live.

Intocable headlined SXSW 2016 SXAmericas All Latino Showcase, making Intocable the first Latino act to headline this three-day series of charity beneficiary concert events. The group took over the largest SXSW stage, which attracted more than 50,000 attendees over the three-day period.

In the early 1990s, the band's first indie albums barely sold. In February 1994, their album Fuego Eterno, with new label EMI Latin, had notable sales. The music of Ramón Ayala influenced the direction of the band. The band's lead vocalist and accordion player, Ricky Muñoz has stated that Ayala is his biggest inspiration. In 1997, the band suffered a setback when two members of the band left to form their own group—Johnny Lee Rosas, (bajo sexto and 2nd voice), and Albert Ramirez, (bass), formed Grupo Masizzo. Rosas rejoined the group in 2003 after four successful solo albums. In July 2017, Intocable performed their first ever concert in Toronto, Ontario, Canada.

On June 11, 2020, Intocable came back out on tour since the pandemic shut down almost everything. They hosted their first Drive-In show in Poteet, Texas.

June 30, 2020, it was announced by lead singer and accordionist Ricky Muñoz that five members tested positive for COVID-19.

On July 16, 2026, Intocable was honored with the 2,852nd star on the Hollywood Walk of Fame.

In July 2026, Intocable has received 6 Latin Diamond Certifications, which makes them the most RIAA Latin Diamond Certified Música Mexicana Band of all time. This is without collaborations, remixes or featured artists. Which makes them #2 in all Latin Genres while Bad Bunny is #1.

On September 15, 2026, the group performed at the Zócalo Capitalino in Mexico City to celebrate the country's independence day. Over 300,000 fans attended the performance. During the performance, they performed their upcoming single "Cuando Se Haga De Noche", announced their upcoming album Nostalgia Radical, and celebrated lead singer and accordionist Ricky Muñoz's 51st birthday.

== Road accident ==
On January 31, 1999, two band members, José Ángel Farias and Silvestre Rodríguez, along with road manager José Ángel González were killed in an accident while driving to Monterrey, Nuevo León, Mexico's Monterrey International Airport to catch a flight to Mexico City. The group's van blew a tire, causing the vehicle to roll off Mexican Federal Highway 40 and crash. After rolling over, Ricky Muñoz was the only one left in the van due to him wearing his seat belt on while the other members were laying on the side of the highway. Muñoz and the remaining members of the group suffered multiple injuries and spent weeks in a Monterrey hospital. After a six-month layoff, Intocable toured successfully behind the comeback album Contigo (With You), whose first single was titled "El Amigo Que Se Fue" (The Friend That Has Left), a tribute song to the fallen band members.

== Latin hits ==
Intocable gained 20 Latin top-10 hits. The following are some of Intocable's songs that reached the top ten on Billboard Latin singles charts: "Caminare", "Te Perdono", "Llueve", "Eso Duele", "Eres Mi Droga", "Amor Maldito", "Soñador Eterno", "Perdedor", "El Amigo Que Se Fue", "Ya Estoy Cansado", "Enséñame a Olvidarte", "Déjame Amarte", "Contra Viento y Marea", "Y Todo Para Qué?" and other songs.

== Band members ==
=== Current members ===
- Ricardo "Ricky" Javier Muñoz – lead vocals, accordion (1993–present)
- René Orlando Martinez – drums, chorus (1993–present)
- Sergio Serna – percussion (1993–present)
- Johnny Lee Rosas – bajo sexto, second voice (1994–1997; 2003–2016; 2017–present)
- Alejandro Gulmar – bajo sexto (2013–present)
- Nick Wells – bass (2026–present)

=== Former members ===
- José Juan Hernández – animator, rhythms (1999–2020)
- Felix Salinas – bass (1995; 1999–2015; 2016–2026)
- Albert Ramírez – bass (1995–1997; 2015)
- Daniel "Danny" Sanchez – bajo sexto, second voice (1997–2007; 2009–2012; 2016–2017)
- José Ángel Farías – Animator, rhythms (1995–1999; deceased)
- Silvestre Rodríguez – bass (1997–1999; deceased)
- José Ángel González – road manager (deceased)
- Juan J. González Jr. – bajo sexto, guitar (1993)
- Juan J. Serna – bass (1993–1995)
- Ismael Arreola Jr. – Animator, Rhythms (1993)

== Discography ==
=== Albums ===
Year	Title	Peak chart positions		
Year	Title	MEX Reg.	US	US Latin
1993	Simplemente... ("Simply...")	—	—	—
1994	Fuego Eterno ("Eternal Fire")	—	—	—
1995	Otro Mundo ("Another World")	4	—	15
1996	Llévame Contigo ("Take Me With You")	1	—	3
1997	IV ("4")	3	—	28
1998	Intocable ("Untouchable")	1	—	1
1999	12 Super Exitos	14	—	40
1999	Contigo ("With You")	2	173	5
2000	Es para Ti ("It's for You")	1	—	1
2001	14 Grandes Exitos	3	—	1
2002	Sueños ("Dreams")	10	131	22
2003	La Historia ("The History")	1	60	1
2003	Nuestro Destino Estaba Escrito ("Our Destiny Was Written")	1	95	2
2004	Íntimamente ("Intimately"; Live album)	1	151	1
2004	Momentos de Colección	17	—	26
2005	X ("10")	1	62	2
2006	Crossroads: Cruce de Caminos	1	59	1
2008	2C ("12")	3	90	4
2009	Classic (Clásico in Mexico)	3	—	8
2010	Super #1's	11	—	20
2011	Intocable 2011	1	—	2
2011	Frente a Frente	15	—	30
2012	Las Mera Buenas	—	—	40
2013	En Peligro de Extinción ("In Danger of Extinction")	1	58	1
2013	Iconos: Intocable: 25 Exitos	—	58	55
2015	XX: 20 Aniversario ("20th Anniversary")	1	—	1
2016	Highway	1	156	1
2019	Percepción ("Perception")	2	—	15
2020	Desde Casa, en Concierto, y Canciones Desempolvadas ("From Home, in Concert, and Dusted Songs")	—	—	—
2020	Texican	—	—	—
2024	Modus Operandi	—	—	—
2024	Modus Operandi: Antología ("Modus Operandi: Anthology")	—	—	—
"—" denotes a recording that did not chart or was not released in that territory

== Awards ==
- Grammy Award for Best Mexican/Mexican-American Album (2005)
- Latin Grammy Award for Best Norteño Album (2005, 2013)
- Grammy Award for Best Norteño Album (2011)
- Billboard Latin Music Lifetime Achievement Award (2012)

== Nominations ==
- ALMA Award for Outstanding Latin Group of the Year (2002)
- American Music Award for Favorite Latin Artist (2004)
- Latin Grammy Award for Album of the Year (2005)
- Latin Grammy Award for Best Short Form Music Video (2006)
- Grammy Award for Best Banda or Norteño Album (2012)
- Grammy Award for Best Regional Mexican Music Album (2014)

== See also ==
- List of best-selling Latin music artists
