= 2001 in Latin music =

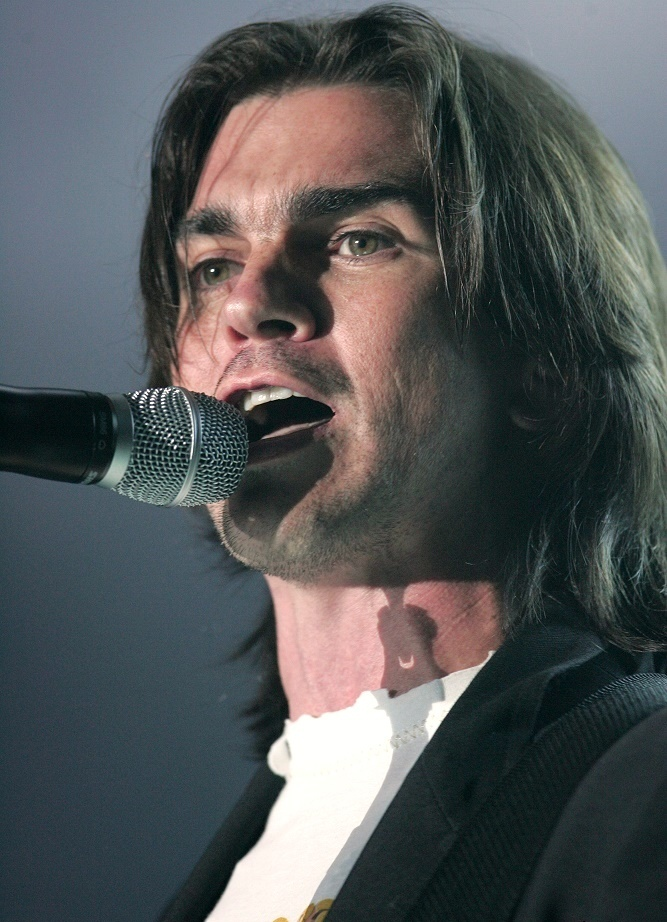
Colombian singer Juanes won the Latin Grammy Award for Best New Artist.

This is a list of notable events in Latin music (i.e., music from the Spanish- and Portuguese-speaking areas Latin America, Latin Europe, and the United States) that took place in 2001.

== Events ==
- January 12–21 – The third Rock in Rio festival is held in Rio de Janeiro, Brazil. Headlining acts are mainly from the US and UK. Several Brazilian bands drop out of the festival in protest over the lack of time allocated to Brazilian acts.
- August 20 – The Latin Recording Academy moves the upcoming Latin Grammy Awards from Miami to Los Angeles following protests by Cuban exiles over the Latin Recording Academy's decision to allow musicians from Cuba to perform on award ceremony.
- September 11 – Following the terrorist attacks in the United States, the 2nd Annual Latin Grammy Awards ceremony, which was planned to air later that day, is promptly canceled and the ceremony was not rescheduled due to logistical problems. The cancellation of the award ceremony cost the organizers an estimated two million dollars in losses.
- October 30 – The 2nd Annual Latin Grammy Awards are held in a press conference at the Conga Room in Los Angeles.
  - Alejandro Sanz wins the Latin Grammy Awards for Song of the Year and Record of the Year for "El Alma al Aire" and Album of the Year for the album of the same name.
  - Juanes wins the Latin Grammy Award for Best New Artist.
  - Julio Iglesias is honored as the Latin Recording Academy Person of the Year.
- December 9 – The Hispanos Unidos Por New York benefit concert is held at the Madison Square Garden featuring Latin acts such as Marc Anthony, Carlos Vives, Alejandro Fernández, Thalía, Juan Luis Guerra, and José José. The concert was held as a relief efforts to both the victims of the September 11 attacks as well as the crash of American Airlines Flight 587.

== Number-ones albums and singles by country ==
- List of number-one albums of 2001 (Spain)
- List of number-one singles of 2001 (Spain)
- List of number-one Billboard Top Latin Albums of 2001
- List of number-one Billboard Hot Latin Tracks of 2001

== Awards ==
- 2001 Latin Grammy Awards
- 2001 Premio Lo Nuestro
- 2001 Billboard Latin Music Awards
- 2001 Tejano Music Awards

== Albums released ==
=== First quarter ===
==== January ====
Day	Title	Artist	Genre(s)	Singles	Label
2	Tango Fatal	Carlos Franzetti	Tango		Amapola Records
9	Tu Veneno	Natalia Oreiro	Downtempo, synth-pop, disco	"Tu Veneno" "Rio de la Plata" "Como Te Olvido"	Ariola, BMG U.S. Latin
23	Gozo Poderoso	Aterciopelados	Alternative rock, pop rock	"Luz Azul" "Rompecabezas" "El Álbum"	Arista, BMG U.S. Latin
30	Instinto y Deseo	Víctor Manuelle	Vocal	"Me Da Lo Mismo" "Cómo Se Lo Explico al Corazón" "Quisiera Inventar"	Sony Discos
31	Reação	Pavilhão 9	Hardcore hip-hop, funk metal		WEA

==== February ====
Day	Title	Artist	Genre(s)	Singles	Label
13	As Canções de Eu Tu Eles	Gilberto Gil	Soundtrack, bossa nova		Atlantic
13	Gitana Soy	Remedios Amaya	Flamenco		Hispavox
13	Despreciado	Lupillo Rivera	Banda		Sony Discos
13	Sueño Repetido	Ricardo Montaner	Ballad	"La Calve del Amor" "Resumiendo" "Bésame" "Cada Quién Con Cada Cual"	WEA Latina, Inc.
13	Todo Tuyo	Pesado			WEA Latina
13	Solo: Live in New York	Chucho Valdés	Contemporary jazz, Latin jazz	"Rumba Quajira"	Blue Note
20	Propuesta	Grupo Niche	salsa, cha-cha		Big Ear Music, PPM
20	Brasilidade	Bossacucanova and Roberto Menescal	Latin, downtempo	"Telefone"	Ziriguiboom, Six Degrees Records
20	Tijuana Sessions Vol. 1	Nortec Collective	House, breaks, Latin	"Polaris" "Norteno de Janeiro" "Tijuana for Dummies"	Palm Pictures, Mil Records
27	Shhh!	A.B. Quintanilla and Los Kumbia Kings		"Shhh!" "Boom Boom" "Desde Que No Estás Aquí" "Think'n About U"	
27	Yo Si Me Enamoré	Huey Dunbar	salsa, son, ballad	"Lo Siento" "Ella" "Amor de Siempre"	Sony Discos
27	De Vuelta y Vuelta	Jarabe de Palo			EMI Latin
27	Sin Límite	Ednita Nazario	Ballad	"Bajo Cero" "Having the Time of My Life"	Sony Discos
27	En Vivo	Liberación	Cumbia, norteno, ranchera		Disa

==== March ====
Day	Title	Artist	Genre(s)	Singles	Label
6	Subir Al Cielo	MDO			Sony Discos, Sony Discos
6	Rivera	Jerry Rivera	Ballad	"Quiero" "Un Beso de Quien Amas"	BMG U.S. Latin
6	Intenso	Gilberto Santa Rosa	salsa	"Alguna Parte de Ti" "Pero No Me Ama"	Sony Discos
13	This Side of Paradise	Néstor Torres	Latin jazz, smooth jazz		Shenachie
19	Na Paz	Sideral	MPB		Polydor, Universal Music
20	Con Banda y de Parranda	Los Razos de Sacramento			
20	Grupomanía 2050	Grupo Manía			Universal
20	Duetos	Armando Manzanero	Bolero		WEA Latina, Inc.
20	Reina de Reinas	Banda Arkángel R-15			Luna Music, Sony Discos
20	Que lo Baile Bien	Los Tigrillos			
27	Live! The Last Concert	Selena	Tejano, dance-pop, disco, cumbia, Latin pop		EMI Latin
27	Siempre Pensando en Ti	Bobby Pulido	Tejano		EMI Latin

=== Second quarter ===
==== April ====
Day	Title	Artist	Genre(s)	Singles	Label
3	Carlos Malta e Pife Muderno	Carlos Malta	Forró, batucada		Rob Digital
3	Ansia de Amar	Conjunto Primavera			Fonovisa
9	Mi Cante y un Poema	Estrella Morente	Flamenco		Real World Records
10	La Charanga Eterna	Orquesta Aragón	Guaracha, son, son montuno, bolero, danzon, rumba		Lusafrica, Lusafrica
10	Yaire	Yaire	Latin pop		Lideres
17	Nocturne	Charlie Haden	Latin jazz		Verve Records
17	Los Hombres Calientes, Vol. 3: New Congo Square	Los Hombres Calientes	Latin jazz, Afro-Cuban jazz		Basin Street Records
17	Para las Madrecitas	Sparx and Lorenzo Antonio			
18	Cronica	Fito Páez	Pop rock		EMI, EMI
18	Sortimento	Zélia Duncan	MPB		Mercury, Universal Music
18	So Alegria	Rio Negro and Solimões			
24	Tango Bar	Raul Jaurena			Chesky Records
24	Hoja en Blanco	Monchy & Alexandra	Bachata		JVN Musical Inc.

==== May ====
Day	Title	Artist	Genre(s)	Singles	Label
1	El General Is Back	El General	Pop Rap, ragga hip-hop, merengue		Lideres
1	Piedras y Flores	Amaury Gutiérrez	Vocal	"Dime Corazón"	Universal, Polydor
8	Cuando Regreso a Tu Brazos	El Coyote y Su Banda Tierra Santa			
8	Mi Corazón	Jaci Velasquez	Vocal	"Cómo Se Cura una Herida"	Sony Discos, Sony Discos
15	Entre Tangos Y Mariachi	Rocío Dúrcal	Ballad, tango, vocal	"Sombras... Nada Más" "Caminito" "A Media Luz" "Nostalgia	Ariola, BMG U.S. Latin
15	En Otra Onda	Tito Nieves	salsa	"Un Amor Así"	WEA Latina, WeaCaribe
15	Le Modulor	Mœnia	Synth-pop, industrial		BMG U.S. Latin, RCA
15	Rey Sol	Fito Páez	Pop rock		Warner Music Argentina
15	Barrio Bravo	Celso Piña	Cumbia		MCM
18	Virus	Camorra			Trama
18	Coisa de Chefe	Claudio Jorge	Samba		Carioca Discos, Caravelas
18	Viola Nordestina	Heraldo do Monte			Kuarup Discos
21	Wetsuit	Grupo Mojado			Fonovisa, Inc.
22	Fuerza Musical	Palomo		"No Me Conoces Aun"	
22	Cachaito	Orlando "Cachaíto" López	Instrumental, Afro-Cuban, descarga, son		World Circuit
29	Más de Mi Alma	Marco Antonio Solís	Ballad, bolero	"O Me Voy o Te Vas" "Sé Que Me Va a Dejar" "Cuando Te Acuerdes de Mí" "Dónde Estará Mi Primavera"	FonoVisa
29	Más con el Número Uno	Vicente Fernández	Ranchera		Sony Discos, Sony Discos
29	Expandiendo Raices/Branching Out	William Cepeda	Latin jazz, fusion		Beans Records, Blue Jackel Entertainment, Blue Jackel Entertainment
30	Vivendo e Não Aprendendo	Ira!	Pop rock		WEA, WEA, WEA

==== June ====
Day	Title	Artist	Genre(s)	Singles	Label
5	Azul	Cristian Castro	Ballad	"Azul" "Yo Quería" "Lloviendo Estrellas" "Con Ella"	BMG U.S. Latin
5	Próxima Estación: Esperanza	Manu Chao			Virgin
5	La Reunión	Banda Machos			Wea Mex
5	Vivo	Vico C	Reggaeton		EMI Latin
5	São João Vivo	Gilberto Gil	Soul-jazz, fusion, jazz-funk, Latin jazz		WEA, Warner Music Brasil Ltda.
5	Villa-Lobos: String Quartets, Vol. 6	Cuarteto Latinoamericano	Modern		Dorian Recordings
12	Lo Mejor de Nosotros	Pepe Aguilar	Mariachi		Musart
12	Homenaje a Chalino Sánchez	El Original de la Sierra	Corrido, norteno		Universal Music Group
12	Desde El Corazón	Los Desperadoz	Tejano		Tejas Records
12	Union	Puya	Jazz-rock, progressive metal, Latin jazz, salsa, fusion, nu metal		MCA Records
19	No Todo Lo Que Es Pop Es Bueno	Circo	Indie pop		HeadMusic
25	Sueños	Intocable	Norteno, cumbia		EMI Latin
26	Encore	Roberto Blades	Vocal, salsa		Lideres
26	Pa' La Calle	Los Toros Band	Merengue, bachata		Universal Music Latino

=== Third quarter ===
==== July ====
Day	Title	Artist	Genre(s)	Singles	Label
1	Cambaio	Chico Buarque and Edu Lobo	MPB		BMG, RCA Victor
7	Sérgio & Odair Assad Play Piazzolla	Sérgio and Odair Assad	Tango		Nonesuch
10	Cuando la Sangre Galopa	Jaguares			BMG U.S. Latin
10	Peces de Ciudad	Ana Belén			Ariola, BMG Espana
10	Entre Amigos	Julio Preciado			RCA, BMG U.S. Latin
17	Yo Por Ti	Olga Tañón	Merengue, Latin, ballad	"Cómo Olvidar" "Ahora Soy Mala" "Miénteme"	WEA Latina, Inc.
17	Supernova	Gonzalo Rubalcaba Trio	Post bop, Afro-Cuban jazz		Blue Note
17	Chuntaros Radio Poder	El Gran Silencio	Cumbia		EMI Latin
18	Yamayá	Lázaro Ros			
18	Orisha Ayé. Shangó	Lázaro Ros	Afro-Cuban		Unicornio Producciones Abdala
23	Bloco do Eu Sozinho	Los Hermanos	Indie Rock, MPB, samba		Abril Music
25	Jessico	Babasónicos	Pop rock, synth-pop		Suave, Discos Popart
29	Contigo Por Siempre...	Banda el Recodo	Banda, ranchera		Fonovisa
31	Bandidos Rurales	León Gieco	Folk rock, rolk, classic rock		EMI
31	Cine Baronesa	Guinga	MPB		Caravelas
31	En Vivo	Los Huracanes del Norte	Ranchera		Fonovisa, Inc.

==== August ====
Day	Title	Artist	Genre(s)	Singles	Label
6	Pachanga	King África	House, Latin		Melody
7	Por Tu Placer	Frankie Negrón	salsa	"Comerte a Besos"	WEA
7	Gilberto Gil & Milton Nascimento	Gilberto Gil and Milton Nascimento	MPB		WEA Music
7	Nydia	Nydia Rojas			Hollywood Records
10	La Rumba Soy Yo	El All-Stars de La Rumba Cubana	Afro-Cuban, rumba		Disco Caramba, Bis Music
13	Oktubre	Patricio Rey	New Wave, hard rock, rock & roll		P. Rey Discos, P. Rey Discos
16	Golijov: La Pasión Según San Marcos	María Guinand			
21	Alexandre Pires	Alexandre Pires	Ballad	"Usted Se Me Llevó la Vida" "Necesidad" "Es Por Amor"	BMG U.S. Latin, RCA
21	Una Pagina Mas: Lo Mejor de los 70's Y 80's	Chuy Vega			
21	Corazón de Mujer	Melina León	Merengue, ballad		Sony Discos
21	Nuevo Milenio-El Mismo Sabor	El Gran Combo de Puerto Rico	salsa	"Me Liberé" "El Amor Es Ciego" "Se Nos Perdió el Amor"	Combo Records
28	Uniendo Fronteras	Los Tigres del Norte	Norteno		FonoVisa
28	Thalía con banda: Grandes éxitos	Thalía			EMI Latin
28	Recodo de Mi Madre	Los Originales de San Juan			

==== September ====
Day	Title	Artist	Genre(s)	Singles	Label
4	En Vivo: Desde la Plaza El Progreso en Guadalajara	Joan Sebastian	Ranchera, Banda		Musart
4	MTV Unplugged	La Ley	Acoustic, pop rock, soft rock, alternative rock		Wea Latina, Inc., WEA Rock
4	Multiplicame	Fuerza Juvenil	salsa, merengue		Envidia
4	El Que Busca Encuentra	Elefante	Pop rock		Sony Discos, Sony Discos
4	Lamento Negro	Susana Baca	Musica Criolla		Tumi Music
5	Buddha's Family	DJ Buddha	Reggaeton, hip-hop		Buddha's Productions
11	Embrace the Chaos	Ozomatli	Latin, hip hop		Interscope Records, Almo Sounds
11	Soy Lo Prohibido	Alicia Villareal			
11	Latin Spirits	Poncho Sanchez	Latin jazz		Concord Picante
13	Da Roca e da Cidade	Martinho da Vila	Samba		Columbia
13	Influencias	Dori Caymmi	Latin jazz, MPB, bossa nova, samba		Universal Music, IN2JAZZ
18	Huelo a soledad	Ana Gabriel	Vocal, ballad		Sony Discos
18	Atrevido	Eddy Herrera	Merengue	"Tu Eres Ajena"	J&N Records
18	Sandunguero	DJ Blass	Reggaeton		Pina Music
24	Para Mi Amor	Priscila & Sus Balas De Plata	Norteno, cumbia, ranchera		FonoVisa
24	Entrega De Amor	Los Rieleros del Norte			
25	En El Idioma del Amor	Grupo Bryndis	Cumbia		Disa
25	Orígenes	Alejandro Fernández	Ranchera, ballad	"Tantita Pena" "Si Tú No Vuelves"	Sony Discos
25	8	Gisselle	Merengue, bachata, vocal		BMG U.S. Latin, Ariola
25	Lo Dice Tu Mirada	Emilio Navaira	Conjunto, Tejano		BMG U.S. Latin
25	Nadie Como Tu	Solido	Conjunto, cumbia, norteno, Tejano		Sony Music Entertainment México, S.A. De C.V.
25	Cambio De Tiempo	Vocal Sampling			Decca
25	Desahogo	Pilar Montenegro	Ballad, ranchera, norteno	"Quitame Ese Hombre"	FonoVisa
25	Tenampa	José José		"Cada Vez y Cada Vez" ""Cómo Hacer Para Olvidar"	BMG U.S. Latin, Ariola

=== Fourth quarter ===
==== October ====
Day	Title	Artist	Genre(s)	Singles	Label
1	En Vivo, Vol. 2	Marco Antonio Solís			FonoVisa
2	La Negra Tiene Tumbao	Celia Cruz	salsa, merengue, Afro-Cuban, rumba	"La Negra Tiene Tumbao" "Hay Que Empezar Otra Vez" "Pa' Arriba No Va"	Sony Discos, Sony Discos
2	Travesía	David Sánchez	Contemporary jazz, Latin jazz		Columbia
2	Somos Gitanos	Gipsy Kings	Ranchera		Nonesuch
3	Acústico MTV	Roberto Carlos	Música popular brasileira, Romantic		Sony Music
9	Déjame Entrar	Carlos Vives	Vallenato, cumbia	"Déjame Entrar" "Luna Nueva" "Carito"	EMI Latin
9	Lo mejor de Laura Pausini: Volveré junto a ti	Laura Pausini	Ballad, soft rock, vocal	"Volveré junto a ti"	WEA Latina
9	Ofrenda	Pedro Guerra	Vocal, ethno-pop, folk		Ariola, BMG Espana
15	Inconfundible	La Mafia			
15	Só Para Baixinhos 2	Xuxa	Educational		Som Livre
16	Gente	Presuntos Implicados	Smooth jazz		WEA
17	Jobiniando	Ivan Lins	MPB, bossa nova		Abril Music
21	Si*Sé	Si*Sé	Downtempo, breaks, Latin, future jazz		Luaka bop
23	Moviendo las Plumas	El Chichicuilote			Lideres
23	Libre	Marc Anthony	salsa, bolero	"Celos" "Hasta Que Vuelvas Conmigo" "Viviendo" "Barco a la Deriva"	Sony Discos, Columbia, Sony Discos, Columbia
23	Soy	Alejandra Guzmán	Pop rock, ballad		RCA, BMG U.S. Latin
23	A Palo Limpio	Kinito Méndez	Hip-house, merengue, Afro-Cuban, Latin		J&N Records
23	El Arte del Sabor	Bebo Valdés Trio	Latin jazz		Blue Note
23	Con el Polvo Hasta la Muerte	Los Razos			
23	Alma de Santiago	Jane Bunnett	Latin jazz		Blue Note
25	Muriendo de Frio	Guardianes Del Amor	Ballad, cumbia		Fonovisa
30	De Pata Negra	Melody	Vocal, Europop		Sony Discos
30	Sereno	Miguel Bosé	Soft rock, pop rock		WEA
30	Navigator	José Padilla	Downtempo, ambient		Maverick
30	Te Regalo la Lluvia	Ana Bárbara	Ballad		Fonovisa, Inc.
30	Sangre de Rey	Michael Salgado			Sony Discos
Unknown	A Melhor Banda de Todos os Tempos da Última Semana	Titãs	Pop rock, alternative rock	"A Melhor Banda de Todos os Tempos da Última Semana", Epitáfio, "O Mundo É Bão, Sebastião!"	Abril Music

==== November ====
Day	Title	Artist	Genre(s)	Singles	Label
2	Tango Por Vos	Julia Zenko	Tango		Epsa
2	CPM 22	CPM 22	Alternative rock, pop rock, Punk		Abril Music, Arsenal Music
5	Te Voy a Enamorar	Los Ángeles de Charly	Cumbia		FonoVisa
6	A Prueba De Balas	Banda Machos	Ballad, bolero, Charanga, Corrido, cumbia, ranchera		Warner Music Latina, Wea Mex, Warner Strategic Marketing
6	Navidad	Jaci Velasquez	Vocal, ballad, Latin, Christmas music		Sony Discos, Word Entertainment
9	Paz – Ao Vivo	Padre Marcelo Rossi	Ballad, Gospel		Mercury
13	Mis Romances	Luis Miguel	Ballad	"Amor, Amor, Amor" "Cómo Duele" "Al Que Me Siga"	Warner Music Latina
13	Sufriendo a Solas	Lupillo Rivera	Banda		Sony Discos, Cintas Acuario
13	Cuban Masters – Los Originales	Various artists			
13	Perdón Por Extrañarte	Los Mismos			
13	...Ahora y Siempre	Liberación			
13	El Ultimo Adios (The Last Goodbye)	Various artists			
20	MTV Unplugged	Alejandro Sanz	Acoustic, soft rock, Latin, pop rock	"Y Sólo Me Ocurré Amarte" "Aprendíz"	WEA Latina Inc.
20	De un Solo Sentimiento	Charlie Zaa	Bolero	"Flor Sin Retoño"	Industria Electro Sonora S.A.
20	Americanizao	Fulanito	House, merengue		Foca Records
20	Mancha Registrada	Super Ratones	Pop rock		EMI
20	Quiero Llegar a la Casa	Tito Rojas			Musical Productions
20	Pa' Los Treseros	Nelson González	Afro-Cuban, bomba, danzon, descarga, guaguancó, guaracha, son montuno, son		Agogo
20	Mensaje De Oro	Los Huracanes del Norte			
20	El Autentico Y Unico en Vivo	El Poder Del Norte			
20	Moreno	Jorge Moreno			
20	Buenos Muchachos	La Mosca Tsé Tsé			EMI
20	Un Mundo Diferente	Diego Torres	Pop rock, ballad	"Color Esperanza"	RCA, BMG U.S. Latin
26	Viva La Vida	Rabito	Ballad		FonoVisa
27	Retro Momentos	Leonard Gonzales and Los Magnificos			
27	Siempre Humilde	Jimmy González & El Grupo Mazz	Tejano		Freddie Records

==== December ====
Day	Title	Artist	Genre(s)	Singles	Label
4	Calle Sabor, Esquina Amor	Limi-T 21			EMI Latin
4	Condom Black	Otto	Drum 'n' Bass		Trama, Trama
4	Paradeiro	Marisa Monte			
4	Juventude/Slow Motion Bossa Nova	Celso Fonseca and Ronaldo Bastos	MPB, bossa nova		Universal Music Latino
5	Se las Voy a Dar a Otro	Jenni Rivera	Banda		Fonovisa Records, Univision Music Group
5	Festa	Ivete Sangalo	Afro-Cuban, MPB, batucada, axe		Universal Music, Mercury
11	Miguel Ríos y las estrellas del rock latino	Miguel Ríos	Rock & roll		Bat Discos, Rock & Rios Records
11	Libertad del Alma	Draco Rosa			Sony Discos
11	Un Paso a la Eternidad	Sindicato Argentino del Hip Hop			Interdisc, Mercury
11	Sin Bandera	Sin Bandera	salsa, tango, vocal, ballad	"Entra en Mi Vida" "Kilometros"	Sony Discos

=== Unknown ===
Title	Artist	Genre(s)	Singles	Label
Siempre en Mi Mente	Los Tri-O			BMG
Batuque	Ney Matogrosso	MPB		Universal Music
Muévete, Muévete Más	Grupo Atrapado			
De Nuevos a Viejos	Wisin & Yandel	Reggaeton		Borikua Muzik
Musica das Esferas, Vol. 3: Terra	Marcus Viana			
Canciones para Normales y Mero Dementes	Rosendo Mercado	Hard rock		DRO
Muchas Flores	Rosario Flores	Flamenco, pop rock		Ariola, BMG Espana, Sony Music, Epic
Vuela	Mónica Molina			Virgin, Virgin
CD Pirata	Nocaute	Pop rap		Black Groove
Celesteacustica	Celeste Carballo			
Ingrata	Ram Herrera	Tejano		Tejas Records
Corren Tiempos De Alegria	Diego El Cigala	Flamenco		Ariola, BMG Espana
Adiós Nonino – Quarteto Amazônia Toca Astor Piazzolla	Quarteto Amazonia			
Afrodisíaco	Tony Tun Tun			
Un Sueño de Amor	Rogelio Martinez			
AllStar	La Secta AllStar			
Enfermos del Amor	Los Acosta			
Como É Que Se Diz Eu te Amo	Legião Urbana	Pop rock		EMI
DJ Pablito presenta La Factoría	La Factoría	Reggaeton		
De Bichos y Flores	La Vela Puerca	Ska		Universal, Surco

== Best-selling records ==
=== Best-selling albums ===
The following is a list of the top 10 best-selling Latin albums in the United States in 2001, according to Billboard.

Rank	Album	Artist
1	Paulina	Paulina Rubio
2	Mi Reflejo	Christina Aguilera
3	Historia de un Ídolo, Vol. 1	Vicente Fernández
4	Shhh!	A.B. Quintanilla and Los Kumbia Kings
5	Despreciado	Lupillo Rivera
6	La Historia	Ricky Martin
7	El Sapo	Azul Azul
8	Historia Musical Romántica	Grupo Bryndis
9	Vivo	Luis Miguel
10	Más de Mi Alma	Marco Antonio Solís

=== Best-performing songs ===
The following is a list of the top 10 best-performing Latin songs in the United States in 2001, according to Billboard.

Rank	Single	Artist
1	"Abrázame Muy Fuerte"	Juan Gabriel
2	"Azul"	Cristian Castro
3	"Te Quisé Olvidar"	MDO
4	"O Me Voy o Te Vas"	Marco Antonio Solís
5	"Por Amarte Así"	Cristian Castro
6	"Cómo Se Cura una Herida"	Jaci Velasquez
7	"Yo Te Amo"	Chayanne
8	"La Bomba"	Azul Azul
9	"Despreciado"	Lupillo Rivera
10	"No Me Conoces Aun"	Palomo

== Births ==
- June 23 – Bárbara Bandeira, Portuguese singer
- December 7 – Quevedo, Spanish rapper

== Deaths ==
- April 11 – Graciela Naranjo, Venezuelan bolero singer, 84
- July 18 – Mimi Fariña, Latin American singer-songwriter, 56 (neuroendocrine cancer)
- December 29 – Cássia Eller, Brazilian singer and composer, 39 (heart attack)
