= List of number-one Billboard Top Latin Albums of 2001 =

The Billboard Top Latin albums chart, published in Billboard magazine, is a chart that features Latin music sales information. This data are compiled by Nielsen SoundScan from a sample that includes music stores, music departments at electronics and department stores, internet sales (both physical and via digital downloads) and verifiable sales from concert venues in United States.

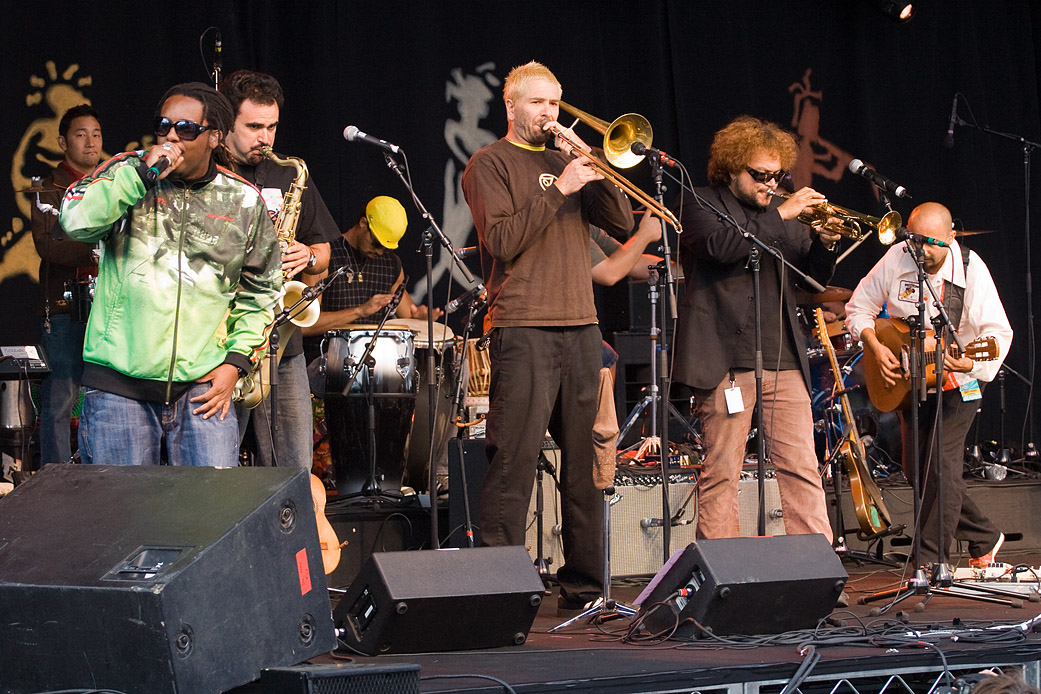
Ozomatli, peaked at number one for the first time on this chart in 2001

There were twenty number-one albums on this chart in 2001, including the first Spanish language album by Christina Aguilera, which spent five weeks at the top in 2001 and 14 weeks in 2000 and won the Latin Grammy Award for Best Female Pop Vocal Album. Ricky Martin, Marco Antonio Solís, Conjunto Primavera and Los Tigres del Norte hit the top spot for the second time on their careers, respectively. Singer-songwriter Marc Anthony with Libre achieved his third chart-topper on this list. Grupo Bryndis became the third act to release two number-one albums in the same year, after Tex-Mex performer Selena on 1995 and 1996 (see: Top Latin Albums of 1995 and Top Latin Albums of 1996) and Enrique Iglesias in 1999 (see: Top Latin Albums of 1999).

Vicente Fernández, Víctor Manuelle, Lupillo Rivera, A.B. Quintanilla and Kumbia Kings, El Original de la Sierra, Jaguares, Joan Sebastian, Ozomatli, Carlos Vives and Los Ángeles de Charly peaked at number one for the first time. Paulina by Mexican performer Paulina Rubio received three Latin Grammy nominations, including Album of the Year and ended the year as the best selling Latin album of 2001.

== Albums ==
Issue Date	Album	Artist	Reference
January 6	Mi Reflejo	Christina Aguilera	
January 13	Mi Reflejo	Christina Aguilera	
January 20	Mi Reflejo	Christina Aguilera	
January 27	Mi Reflejo	Christina Aguilera	
February 3	Mi Reflejo	Christina Aguilera	
February 10	Historia de un Idolo, Vol. 1	Vicente Fernández	
February 17	Instinto y Deseo	Víctor Manuelle	
February 24	Paulina	Paulina Rubio	
March 3	Paulina	Paulina Rubio	
March 10	Despreciado	Lupillo Rivera	
March 17	La Historia	Ricky Martin	
March 24	La Historia	Ricky Martin	
March 31	Shhh!	A.B. Quintanilla and Kumbia Kings	
April 7	La Historia	Ricky Martin	
April 14	Ansia de Amar	Conjunto Primavera	
April 21	Ansia de Amar	Conjunto Primavera	
April 28	La Historia	Ricky Martin	
May 5	La Historia	Ricky Martin	
May 12	Shhh!	A.B. Quintanilla and Kumbia Kings	
May 19	Shhh!	A.B. Quintanilla and Kumbia Kings	
May 26	Paulina	Paulina Rubio	
June 2	Shhh!	A.B. Quintanilla and Kumbia Kings	
June 9	Shhh!	A.B. Quintanilla and Kumbia Kings	
June 16	Más de Mi Alma	Marco Antonio Solís	
June 23	Más de Mi Alma	Marco Antonio Solís	
June 30	Más de Mi Alma	Marco Antonio Solís	
July 7	Homenaje a Chalino Sánchez	El Original de la Sierra	
July 14	Más de Mi Alma	Marco Antonio Solís	
July 21	Shhh!	A.B. Quintanilla and Kumbia Kings	
July 28	Cuando la Sangre Galopa	Jaguares	
August 4	Historia Musical Romántica	Grupo Bryndis	
August 11	Historia Musical Romántica	Grupo Bryndis	
August 18	Historia Musical Romántica	Grupo Bryndis	
August 25	Historia Musical Romántica	Grupo Bryndis	
September 1	Historia Musical Romántica	Grupo Bryndis	
September 8	Uniendo Fronteras	Los Tigres del Norte	
September 15	Uniendo Fronteras	Los Tigres del Norte	
September 22	Uniendo Fronteras	Los Tigres del Norte	
September 29	Embrace the Chaos	Ozomatli	
October 6	Galería Caribe	Ricardo Arjona	
October 13	En El Idioma del Amor	Grupo Bryndis	
October 20	En El Idioma del Amor	Grupo Bryndis	
October 27	En El Idioma del Amor	Grupo Bryndis	
November 3	En Vivo: Desde la Plaza El Progreso en Guadalajara	Joan Sebastian	
November 10	En Vivo: Desde la Plaza El Progreso en Guadalajara	Joan Sebastian	
November 17	En Vivo: Desde la Plaza El Progreso en Guadalajara	Joan Sebastian	
November 24	Te Voy a Enamorar	Los Ángeles de Charly	
December 1	Déjame entrar	Carlos Vives	
December 8	Libre	Marc Anthony	
December 15	Libre	Marc Anthony	
December 22	Libre	Marc Anthony	
December 29	Libre	Marc Anthony	
