= List of Billboard Regional Mexican Albums number ones of 2001 =

The Regional Mexican Albums, published in Billboard magazine, is a record chart that features Latin music sales information for regional styles of Mexican music. This data are compiled by Nielsen SoundScan from a sample that includes music stores, music departments at department stores and verifiable sales from concert venues in the United States.

== Albums ==
Issue Date	Album	Artist	Reference
January 6	Historia De Un Idolo Vol. 1	Vicente Fernández	
January 13	Historia De Un Idolo Vol. 1	Vicente Fernández	
January 20	Historia De Un Idolo Vol. 1	Vicente Fernández	
January 27	Historia De Un Idolo Vol. 1	Vicente Fernández	
February 3	Historia De Un Idolo Vol. 1	Vicente Fernández	
February 10	Historia De Un Idolo Vol. 1	Vicente Fernández	
February 17	Historia De Un Idolo Vol. 1	Vicente Fernández	
February 24	Historia De Un Idolo Vol. 1	Vicente Fernández	
March 3	Despreciado	Lupillo Rivera	
March 10	Despreciado	Lupillo Rivera	
March 17	Despreciado	Lupillo Rivera	
March 24	Historia De Un Idolo Vol. 1 †	Vicente Fernández	
March 31	Historia De Un Idolo Vol. 1 †	Vicente Fernández	
April 7	Contigo Por Siempre..	Banda el Recodo de Cruz Lizarraga	
April 14	Ansia de Amar	Conjunto Primavera	
April 21	Ansia de Amar	Conjunto Primavera	
April 28	Ansia de Amar	Conjunto Primavera	
May 5	Ansia de Amar	Conjunto Primavera	
May 12	Ansia de Amar	Conjunto Primavera	
May 19	Ansia de Amar	Conjunto Primavera	
May 26	Despreciado	Lupillo Rivera	
June 2	Historia De Un Idolo Vol. 1 †	Vicente Fernández	
June 9	Despreciado	Lupillo Rivera	
June 16	Despreciado	Lupillo Rivera	
June 23	Despreciado	Lupillo Rivera	
June 30	Despreciado	Lupillo Rivera	
July 7	Homanje A Chalino Sanchez	Jessie Morales El Original de la Sierra	
July 14	Historia Musical Romántica	Grupo Bryndis	
July 21	Historia Musical Romántica	Grupo Bryndis	
July 28	Historia Musical Romántica	Grupo Bryndis	
August 4	Historia Musical Romántica	Grupo Bryndis	
August 11	Historia Musical Romántica	Grupo Bryndis	
August 18	Historia Musical Romántica	Grupo Bryndis	
August 25	Historia Musical Romántica	Grupo Bryndis	
September 1	Historia Musical Romántica	Grupo Bryndis	
September 8	Uniendo Fronteras	Los Tigres del Norte	
September 15	Uniendo Fronteras	Los Tigres del Norte	
September 22	Uniendo Fronteras	Los Tigres del Norte	
September 29	Historia Musical	Los Angeles Azules	
October 6	Historia Musical	Los Angeles Azules	
October 13	En El Idioma Del Amor	Grupo Bryndis	
October 20	En El Idioma Del Amor	Grupo Bryndis	
October 27	En El Idioma Del Amor	Grupo Bryndis	
November 3	En Vivo: Desde La Plaza El Progreso De Guadalajara	Joan Sebastian	
November 10	En Vivo: Desde La Plaza El Progreso De Guadalajara	Joan Sebastian	
November 17	En Vivo: Desde La Plaza El Progreso De Guadalajara	Joan Sebastian	
November 24	Te Voy a Enamorar	Los Angeles de Charly	
December 1	En Vivo: Desde La Plaza El Progreso De Guadalajara †	Joan Sebastian	
December 8	Sufriendo A Solas	Lupillo Rivera	
December 15	Sufriendo A Solas	Lupillo Rivera	
December 22	Sufriendo A Solas	Lupillo Rivera	
December 29	Sufriendo A Solas	Lupillo Rivera	
