= List of number-one hits of 1995 (Mexico) =

This is a list of the songs that reached number one in Mexico in 1995, according to the Notitas Musicales magazine with data provided by Radio Mil(which also provided charts for Billboard's "Hits of the World" between 1969 and 1981). Notitas Musicales was a bi-weekly magazine that published two record charts:

- "Canciones que México canta" ("Songs that Mexico sings"), which listed the Top 10 most popular Spanish-language songs in Mexico, and
- "Éxitos internacionales en México" ("International Hits in Mexico"), which listed the most popular songs in Mexico that were in languages other than Spanish.

In September, the magazine began publishing three new mini-charts: "Éxitos gruperos", "Éxitos rancheros" and "Tropicales", which respectively listed the top three most popular Grupera, Ranchera and Tropical songs in Mexico.

== Chart history ==
Note: Blank spaces indicate that the number-one songs for those dates have not been determined yet, as the Notitas Musicales print issues for those dates have not been posted online thus far.

Issue Date	Spanish-language songs		Other languages		Ref.
Issue Date	Song	Artist(s)	Song	Artist(s)	Ref.
3 January	"Lentamente"	Juan Gabriel	"Always"	Bon Jovi	
17 January	"Siempre contigo"	Lucero	"Secret"	Madonna	
31 January	"La Media Vuelta"	Luis Miguel	"Secret"	Madonna	
14 February	"Mi forma de sentir"	Pedro Fernández	"Secret"	Madonna	
28 February
14 March	"Todo y Nada"	Luis Miguel	"Always"	Bon Jovi	
28 March	"Mi forma de sentir"	Pedro Fernández	"Short Dick Man" (Note: Listed as "Short Short Man" by Gillette.)	20 Fingers ft. Gillette	
11 April	"Mi forma de sentir"	Pedro Fernández	"Ode to My Family"	The Cranberries	
25 April	"Mi forma de sentir"	Pedro Fernández	"Short Dick Man"	20 Fingers ft. Gillette	
9 May	"Malherido"	Magneto	"Short Dick Man"	20 Fingers ft. Gillette	
23 May	"Malherido"	Magneto	"Short Dick Man"	20 Fingers ft. Gillette	
6 June	"Se fue"	Laura Pausini	"Short Dick Man"	20 Fingers ft. Gillette	
20 June	"Formas de amor"	Caló	"Believe"	Elton John	
4 July	"Formas de amor"	Caló	"No More I Love You's"	Annie Lenox	
18 July	"Palabras"	Lucero	"Scream"	Michael Jackson and Janet Jackson	
4 August	"Palabras"	Lucero	"Scream"	Michael Jackson and Janet Jackson	
18 August	"Dime la verdad"	Marta Sánchez	"Lick It"	20 Fingers ft. Roula (Note: Only Roula is credited on the chart.)	
1 September
15 September	"Mentira para dos"	Magneto	"This Ain't a Love Song"	Bon Jovi	
29 September	"Mentira para dos"	Magneto	"This Ain't a Love Song"	Bon Jovi	
13 October	"Mentira para dos"	Magneto	"This Ain't a Love Song"	Bon Jovi	
27 October	"¿De qué te vale fingir?"	Yuri	"Kiss from a Rose"	Seal	
10 November	"¿De qué te vale fingir?"	Yuri	"Kiss from a Rose"	Seal	
24 November	"Te Extraño, Te Olvido, Te Amo"	Ricky Martin	"A Girl Like You"	Edwyn Collins	
8 December
22 December

Issue Date	Éxitos gruperos		Éxitos rancheros		Tropicales		Ref.
Issue Date	Song	Artist(s)	Song	Artist(s)	Song	Artist(s)	Ref.
29 September	"Si ya no te vuelvo a ver"	Los Bukis	"El palo"	Juan Gabriel	"Piel morena"	Thalía	
13 October
27 October	"Tu traición"	Grupo Bryndis	"Si nos dejan"	Luis Miguel	"Piel morena"	Thalía	
10 November
24 November	"Esa mujer"	Bronco	"Si nos dejan"	Luis Miguel	"Piel morena"	Thalía	
8 December
22 December

== See also ==
- 1995 in music

== Sources ==
- Print editions of the Notitas Musicales magazine.
