= Sólo Pienso En Ti =

Sólo Pienso En Ti may refer to:

- "Sólo pienso en ti" (Víctor Manuel song), 1979
- Sólo Pienso En Ti (Lucero album), 1991
- Sólo pienso en ti (Grupo Bryndis album), 2007
- "Solo Pienso En Ti" (Paulo Londra song), 2019
