= List of Billboard Tropical Airplay number ones of 2001 =

The Latin Tropical Airplay chart is a music chart that ranks the best-performing tropical songs of the United States. The chart has since been renamed to the Tropical Songs chart. Published by Billboard magazine, the data are compiled by Nielsen SoundScan based on each single's weekly airplay. The lists contains the number-one Latin Tropical Airplay tracks of 2001.

== Chart history ==
Issue date	Song	Artist(s)	Reference(s)
January 6, 2001	"Wow! Flash"	Elvis Crespo	
January 13, 2001	"Pegame Tu Vicio"	Eddy Herrera	
January 20, 2001	"Te Quise Olvidar"	MDO	
January 27, 2001	"Te Quise Olvidar"	MDO	
February 3, 2001	"Cuando Seas Mia (Salsa version)"	Son By Four	
February 10, 2001	"Cuando Seas Mia"	Son By Four	
February 17, 2001	"Me Da lo Mismo"	Víctor Manuelle	
February 24, 2001	"Me Da lo Mismo"	Víctor Manuelle	
March 3, 2001	"Me Da lo Mismo"	Víctor Manuelle	
March 10, 2001	"Me Da lo Mismo"	Víctor Manuelle	
March 17, 2001	"Me Da lo Mismo"	Víctor Manuelle	
March 24, 2001	"Me Da lo Mismo"	Víctor Manuelle	
March 31, 2001	"Me Da lo Mismo"	Víctor Manuelle	
April 7, 2001	"Solo Quiero Amarte"	Ricky Martin	
April 14, 2001	"Solo Quiero Amarte"	Ricky Martin	
April 21, 2001	"Quiero (Salsa version)"	Jerry Rivera	
April 28, 2001	"Quiero (Salsa version)"	Jerry Rivera	
May 5, 2001	"Quiero (Salsa version)"	Jerry Rivera	
May 12, 2001	"Quiero (Salsa version)"	Jerry Rivera	
May 19, 2001	"Quiero (Salsa version)"	Jerry Rivera	
May 26, 2001	"Quiero (Salsa version)"	Jerry Rivera	
June 2, 2001	"Quiero (Salsa version)"	Jerry Rivera	
June 9, 2001	"Pero No Me Ama"	Gilberto Santa Rosa	
June 16, 2001	"Como Se Explico al Corazon"	Víctor Manuelle	
June 23, 2001	"La Bomba"	Azul Azul	
June 30, 2001	"La Bomba"	Azul Azul	
July 7, 2001	"Azul" (Merengue version)	Cristian Castro	
July 14, 2001	"Azul" (Merengue version)	Cristian Castro	
July 21, 2001	"Azul" (Merengue version)	Cristian Castro	
July 28, 2001	"Como Se Explico al Corazon"	Víctor Manuelle	
August 4, 2001	"Azul" (Merengue version)	Cristian Castro	
August 11, 2001	"Como Olvidar" (Merengue version)	Olga Tañón	
August 18, 2001	"Me Libere"	El Gran Combo de Puerto Rico	
August 25, 2001	"Me Libere"	El Gran Combo de Puerto Rico	
September 1, 2001	"Como Olvidar" (Merengue version)	Olga Tañón	
September 8, 2001	"Pueden Decir"	Gilberto Santa Rosa	
September 15, 2001	"Me Libere"	El Gran Combo de Puerto Rico	
September 22, 2001	"Como Olvidar" (Merengue version)	Olga Tañón	
September 29, 2001	"Como Olvidar" (Merengue version)	Olga Tañón	
October 6, 2001	"Pueden Decir" (Salsa version)	Gilberto Santa Rosa	
October 13, 2001	"Pueden Decir" (Salsa version)	Gilberto Santa Rosa	
October 20, 2001	"Pueden Decir" (Salsa version)	Gilberto Santa Rosa	
October 27, 2001	"Pueden Decir" (Salsa version)	Gilberto Santa Rosa	
November 3, 2001	"Pueden Decir" (Salsa version)	Gilberto Santa Rosa	
November 10, 2001	"Pueden Decir" (Salsa version)	Gilberto Santa Rosa	
November 17, 2001	"Celos"	Marc Anthony	
November 24, 2001	"Déjame Entrar"	Carlos Vives	
December 1, 2001	"Déjame Entrar"	Carlos Vives	
December 8, 2001	"Celos"	Marc Anthony	
December 15, 2001	"Celos"	Marc Anthony	
December 22, 2001	"Celos"	Marc Anthony	
December 29, 2001	"Celos"	Marc Anthony	
