= Que Levante La Mano =

Single by Los Ángeles de Charly

Single by Los Ángeles de Charly

from the album Te Voy a Enamorar
- Released: 2002
- Genre: Cumbia
- Length: 3:16
- Label: Fonovisa
- Songwriter: Alejandro Venazzi

Los Ángeles de Charly singles chronology
"Me Volví a Acordar de Ti" (2001)	"Que Levante La Mano" (2002)	"Por un Minuto de Tu Amor" (2002)

"Que Levante La Mano" ("Raise Your Hand") is a song written by Argentine composer Alejandro Vezzani and performed by Mexican musical group Los Ángeles de Charly for their third studio album Te Voy a Enamorar (2001) where it was released as the second single in 2002. The song is clearly an anthem for all the persons that have suffered in the love, with verses like

Spanish: Que levante la mano quien no lloro un adiós, que levante la mano quien no sufrió por amor. (English: The one who hasn't cried a goodbye, raise your hand, The one who hasn't suffered for love, raise your hand.)

It peaked at #46 on the Hot Latin Songs and #16 on the Regional Mexican Airplay charts in the United States. In 2002, Puerto Rican merengue singer Joseph Fonseca covered "Que Levante La Mano" for his second studio album Escuchame. A bachata version was also recorded for the album. Fonseca's cover was released as a single in 2003 and peaked at #40 on the Hot Latin Songs and #5 on the Latin Tropical Airplay charts in the US.

== Américo version ==
"Que Levante La Mano"

Single by Américo

from the album A Morir
- Released: 2009
- Genre: Cumbia, Tropical
- Length: 3:16
- Label: Feria Music
- Songwriter: Alejandro Benazzi
- Producers: Estanis Mogollón, Benazzi

Américo singles chronology
"Te Vas" (2009)	"Que Levante La Mano" (2009)

In 2008, Chilean musician Américo covered "Que Levante La Mano" for his second studio album A Morir. It was as the second single on 21 July 2009 in radios in Chile. The music video of the song was released previously than the single release, specifically the 9 July 2009. The video is a concert recording.

=== Promotion ===
The single has become a Cumbia standard since its release, being used in many Chilean TV shows. Américo has performed the song in TV shows promoting his album A Morir, and since its release it is recognized as Américo's signature song. Some of these TV shows are Buenos dias a todos, Mira quien habla, Viva la mañana, Intrusos, S.Q.P., Alfombra roja, Calle 7, Yingo, Mucho gusto, Pollo en Conserva, Animal nocturno, Chile, país de talentos and La muralla infernal. Also he performed the song in reality shows such as Pelotón y 1810.

=== In other media ===
The song was featured in the 2015 film The 33.
