= Sólo pienso en ti (Grupo Bryndis album) =

Studio album by Grupo Bryndis
- Released: 2007
- Genre: Grupera
- Label: Disa

Grupo Bryndis chronology
15 Grandes: El Inicio de una Historia (2007)	Sólo pienso en ti (2007)	La Magía de Tu Amor (2008)

Sólo pienso en ti is a 2007 album by Grupo Bryndis, winning the award for best grupero album at the 8th Annual Latin Grammy Awards. It was the group's last album for Disa before moving to EMI. The title track, with lyrics commencing "Ahora que te conocí, tan solo pienso y pienso en ti", is an original composition by Grupo Bryndis, and not a cover of the Víctor Manuel song.

== Track listing ==
- "Cómo olvidar"
- "Qué fue lo que pasó"
- "Para qué fingir"
- "Cenizas"
- "Cara de gitana"
- "Angel de la noche"
- "Infiel"
- "Sólo pienso en ti"
- "Mi chica ideal"
- "Para ti mamá"
- "Si me quisieras un poquito"
- "La chica del este"
