= Pachanga (disambiguation) =

Pachanga is a genre of music which is described as a mixture of son montuno and merengue and has an accompanying signature style of dance.

Pachanga or La Pachanga may also refer to:

- La Pachanga (film), a 1981 film directed by Mexican filmmaker José Estrada
- Pachanga (duo), a Puerto Rican / German reggaeton and Latin music duo
- Pachanga (album), album by Argentine pop singer King África
- "La Pachanga" (song), a 1959 song by Cuban musician Eduardo Davidson
- !Arriba! La Pachanga, 1959 album by Mongo Santamaría
- Pachanga Latino Music Festival, first Latin-themed music, cultural arts and food festival originated in Austin, Texas, USA

== See also ==
- Pachanga Diliman F.C., a Filipino association football club based in Diliman, Quezon City
- Pachangara District, one of six districts of the province Oyón in Peru
- Pechanga or Pechanga Band of Luiseño Indians, a federally recognized tribe of Luiseño Indians based in Riverside County, California, where their reservation is located
- Pechenga (disambiguation)
