= Como Duele =

Como Duele may refer to:

- "Como Duele" (Ricardo Arjona song), 2008 song
- "Como Duele", 1998 song by Manny Manuel
- "Como Duele", 1999 song by Victor Manuelle from the album Inconfundible
- "Como Duele", 2001 song by Luis Miguel from the album Mis Romances
- "Como Duele", 2005 song by Noelia for the telenovela Barrera de amor
