= Mi Verdadero Amor =

Studio album by Grupo Bryndis
- Released: September 26, 1996
- Recorded: 1995-1996
- Studios: Estudios Disa, San Nicolás de los Garza, Nuevo León, Mexico
- Genres: Romantic music, Latin
- Length: 37:52
- Labels: FONO, under exclusive license to Universal Music Latino
- Producer: Mauro Posadas

Grupo Bryndis chronology
Tu Amor Secreto (1995)	Mi Verdadero Amor (1996)	Poemas, Vol. 2 (1996)

Mi Verdadero Amor is the eleventh studio album by Grupo Bryndis, released under Disa Records on September 26, 1996. The album consists of ten tracks, which are mostly ballads. Two of the album's tracks became fan favorites upon release (Mi Verdadero Amor and Por Estar Pensando En Ti), and three of the tracks were included in their Historia Musical Romántica compilation. The album was produced by group members Mauro Posadas, Lupe Guevara, and Juan Guevara.

== Track listing ==
No.	Title	Writer(s)	Length
1.	"Mi Verdadero Amor"	Claudio Pablo Montaño	3:47
2.	"Quiero Volver A Verte"	Gerardo Izaguirre	3:17
3.	"Por Estar Pensando En Ti"	Mauro Posadas	3:57
4.	"Márchate"	Lupe Guevara	4:10
5.	"Pagando Mi Error"	Juan Ceballos	3:42
6.	"Me Hace Falta Tu Amor"	Juan Ceballos	3:58
7.	"El Perdedor"	Mauro Posadas	3:45
8.	"Recordándote"	Juan Ceballos	4:05
9.	"Despedida Triste"	Lupe Guevara	3:03
10.	"Cómo Duele Tu Adiós"	Mauro Posadas	3:55

== Personnel ==
- Lupe Guevara - Lead vocalist, producer
- Mauro Posadas - Guitar, group leader, producer
- Claudio Pablo Montaño - Keyboard
- Gerardo Izaguirre - Bass guitar
- Juan Guevara - Drums, producer
- Fernando Montaño - Engineer, Mixing engineer
- Pablo Angel Garza - Engineer
