= Siempre Contigo =

Siempre Contigo may refer to:

- Siempre Contigo (Lucero album), 1995
- Siempre Contigo (José José album), 1986
