= Por el Pasado =

Por El Pasado

Studio album by Grupo Bryndis
- Released: January 25, 2000
- Genre: Cumbia, Balada
- Label: Disa

Grupo Bryndis chronology
Un Juego de Amor (1998)	Por El Pasado (2000)	Historia Musical Romántica (2001)

Por El Pasado ('For The Past') is a studio album released by Grupo Bryndis. All tracks were composed by the band members.

== Track listing ==
1. Porque Me Enamore 3:38 (Guadalupe Guevara)
2. Mi Preciosa Mujer 4:10 (Juan Guevara)
3. Tu Adiós 3:21 (Mauro Posadas)
4. Corazón Vacio 3:46 (Gerardo Izaguirre)
5. Pagando Mi Pasado 3:52 (Mauro Posadas)
6. De Que Sirvio 3:40 (Juan Guevara)
7. Odio, Tencor y Celos 4:26 (Mauro Posadas)
8. El Amor de Mi Vida 3:16 (Claudio Pablo Montano)
9. Dónde Estás? 4:07 (Guadalupe Guevara)
10. Una Aventura Más 3:29 (Juan Guevara)

== Sales and certifications ==
Region	Certification	Certified units/sales
United States (RIAA)	2× Platinum (Latin)	200,000^{^}
^{^} Shipments figures based on certification alone.
