= Todo y Nada =

1957 song by Vicente Garrido

Song by Vicente Garrido
- Released: 1957
- Genre: Bolero
- Songwriter: Vicente Garrido

"Todo y Nada"

Single by Luis Miguel

from the album Segundo Romance
- Released: 1995
- Genre: Latin pop; Bolero; Latin ballad
- Length: 2:42
- Label: WEA Latina
- Songwriter: Vicente Garrido
- Producers: Luis Miguel; Armando Manzanero; Juan Carlos Calderón; Kiko Cibrian

Luis Miguel singles chronology
"La Media Vuelta" (1994)	"Todo y Nada" (1995)	"Delirio" (1995)

"Todo y Nada" ("Everything and Nothing") is a song written and performed by Mexican singer Vicente Garrido Calderón released in 1957 and originally recorded by Los Tres Ases and Lucho Gatica. It was covered by Mexican singer Luis Miguel on his album Segundo Romance (1994) where it was released as the third single from the album in 1995 and reached number three on the Billboard Hot Latin Songs and number one on the Latin Pop Airplay charts, becoming his third number-one song on the latter chart. "Todo y Nada" became Miguel's third consecutive number-one song from Segundo Romance in Mexico; and became a top-five hit in Chile, Panama and Puerto Rico.

This was the second time that Luis Miguel had covered a song by Garrido, the first being "No Me Platiqués Más" on Romance (1991). It was recognized as one best-performing Latin songs of the year at the 1996 BMI Latin Awards.

== Charts ==
=== Weekly charts ===
Chart (1995)	Peak position
Chile (UPI)	2
Mexico (AMPROFON)	1
Panama (UPI)	3
Puerto Rico (UPI)	5
US Hot Latin Songs (Billboard)	3
US Latin Pop Airplay (Billboard)	1

=== Year-end charts ===
Chart (1995)	Peak position
US Latin Songs (Billboard)	32
US Latin Pop Airplay (Billboard)	6

== See also ==
- List of top-ten songs for 1958 in Mexico
- List of number-one Billboard Latin Pop Airplay songs of 1995
- List of number-one hits of 1995 (Mexico)
