= Pechenga =

Pechenga Is the transliteration of two Russian toponyms: Печенга and Печеньга. It may refer to:

== Печенга ==
- Pechenga (river), a river in Murmansk Oblast, Russia
- Pechenga Monastery, a historical monastery
- Pechenga, Kostroma Oblast, a village in Buysky District of Kostroma Oblast
- Pechenga (railway station), Murmansk Oblast, a railway station classified as a rural locality in Pechengsky District of Murmansk Oblast
- Pechenga (urban-type settlement), Murmansk Oblast, Pechengsky District, Murmansk Oblast

== Печеньга ==
- Pechenga (Vaga tributary)
- Pechenga (Kokshenga tributary)
- Pechenga (Sit tributary)
- Pechenga (Sukhona tributary)
- Upper Pechenga
- Lower Pecheng

== See also ==
- Pachanga (disambiguation)
- Pechanga
