= Víctor Manuel =

Spanish singer

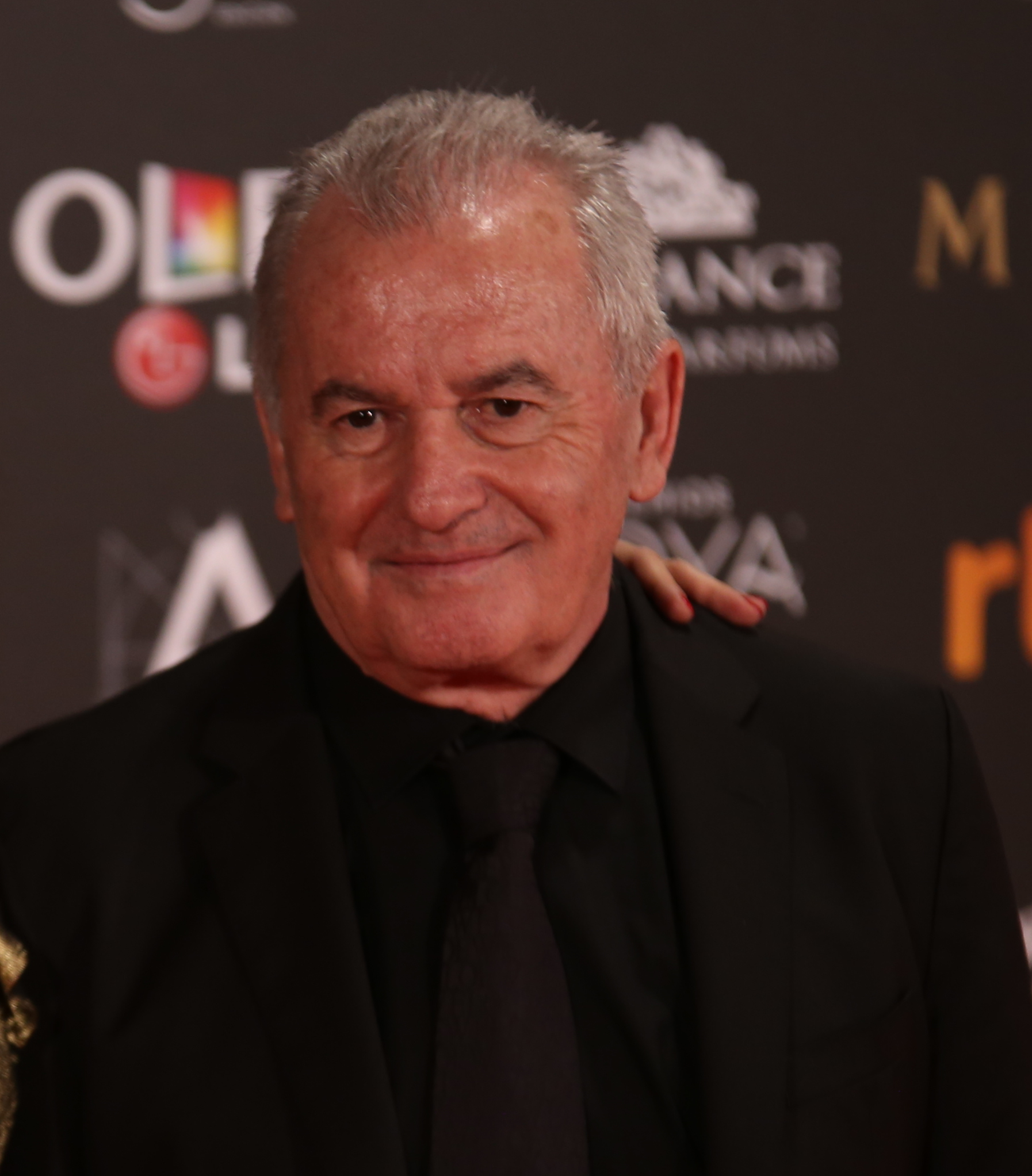
- Víctor Manuel in 2017
- Born: Víctor Manuel San José Sánchez; 7 July 1947 (age 79); Mieres (Asturias), Spain
- Occupation: Singer-songwriter
- Spouse: Ana Belén

Víctor Manuel San José Sánchez (born 7 July 1947) is a Spanish singer-songwriter. He has been married to the Spanish singer and actress Ana Belén since 1972. He and his wife are considered symbols of the Spanish Transition, and his songs and albums often feature boldly-titled works with social and political content.

== Discography ==
=== At the beginning of his career ===
Víctor Manuel edited some singles an EP and an album by the former Spanish discography Belter from 1966 to 1969

- Mucho/Tus cosas (A lot/Your things)
- Un gran hombre/Lejano, lejano (A great man/far away, far away)
- Y Sorrento empezó/El pueblo/Mi música eres tú/No te lo crees ni tú (And Sorrento started/The village/You are my music/Not even you believe it)
- Primer disco/Por caridad/Ninette/Y sin embargo (1966) (The first disc/For pity's sake/Ninette/Nonetheless)
- El tren de madera/El cobarde (1968) (The wooden train/The coward)
- El mendigo/La romería (The beggar/The crowd)
- El abuelo Vítor/Paxarinos (Grandpa Vítor/Birds)
- En el portalín de piedra/Ya se escuchan las panderetas (1969) (In the porch of stone/We are already listening the tambourines)
- Víctor Manuel (1970)

=== Philips-Universal ===
In 1970 Victor Manuel signed for Universal. After his first album, his political songs caused the label to refuse to promote his records, which resulted in one commercial failure after another.

- Quiero abrazarte tanto (1970) (I want to hug you so much)
- Dáme la mano (1971) (Give me your hand)
- OST "Al diablo, con amor" (Ana Belén and Víctor Manuel) (1972) (To the devil, with love)
- Víctor Manuel (edited in México) (1973)
- Verde (popular songs of Asturias) (1973) (Green)
- Todos tenemos un precio (1974) (We all have a price)
- Cómicos (1975) (Comedians)
- Víctor Manuel en Directo (1976) (Víctor Manuel live)
- Spanien (edited in the Democraty German Republic) (1977)
- Canto para todos (1977) (Song for all)
- Diez (1978) (Ten)

=== CBS-Sony-Columbia ===
In 1978 Víctor Manuel signed for CBS. Many people didn't understand why a label could sign a non-commercial singer. However, five of Víctor's six albums resulted in commercial hits, with four number ones and 12 songs out of 60 at the Top 40 from 1979 to 1986.

- Soy un corazón tendido al sol (1978) (I'm a heart laid out in the sun). Includes the song Sólo pienso en ti.
- Luna (1979) (Moon)
- Ay, amor (1981) (Oh, love)
- Por el camino (1983) (Along the way). Includes the song Asturias, originally released as a single by Philips in 1976, whose lyrics were taken from a poem with the same name, composed by Pedro Garfias Zurita in 1937.
- Víctor y Ana en vivo (Ana Belén and Víctor Manuel) (1982) (Víctor and Ana live)
- El lanzador de cuchillos (1984) (The knife thrower)
- En directo (1985) (Live)
- Para la ternura siempre hay tiempo (1986) (There is always time for tenderness)
- Poets in New York (Poetas en Nueva York) (contributor, Federico García Lorca tribute album, 1986)

=== BMG-Ariola ===
After the releasing of Para la ternura siempre hay tiempo, the bestseller of Víctor Manuel, he left CBS and founded his own label, Ion Música, and accorded with BMG the distribution.

- Qué te puedo dar (1988) (What can I give you?)
- Tiempo de cerezas (new versions of old songs) (1989) (Time of cherries)
- El delicado olor de las violetas (1990) (The delicate smell of violets)
- A dónde irán los besos (1993) (Where do kisses go?)
- Mucho más que dos (Ana Belén and Víctor Manuel) (1994) along with 7 more singers like Joan Manuel Serrat, Miguel Ríos, Joaquín Sabina, Pablo Milanés, the former Antonio Flores, Manolo Tena and actor Juan Echanove at the Sport's Palace of Gijón, Spain. (Much more than two)
- Sin memoria (1996) (Without memory)
- Cada uno es como es (1999) (We are the way we are)
- Vivir para cantarlo (1999) (Live to sing it)
- El hijo del ferroviario (2001) (The trainman's son)
- Dos en la carretera (Ana Belén and Víctor Manuel) (2001) (Two along the road)
- El perro del garaje (2004) (The dog of the garage)
- Una canción me trajo aquí (Ana Belén and Víctor Manuel) (2006) (A song took me here)
- No hay nada mejor que escribir una canción (2008) (There is nothing better than writing a song)

Others

- En Blanco y Negro (Pablo Milanés and Víctor Manuel) (1995) (In black and white)
- El gusto es nuestro (Ana Belén, Víctor Manuel, Miguel Ríos y Joan Manuel Serrat) (1996) (Our pleasure)
- Hecho en Asturias (Nuberu, Tejedor, Mari Luz Cristóbal y Víctor Manuel. Concert directed by Ramón Prada and recorded in Oviedo, Asturies, on Asturies' Day) (2002) (Made in Asturies)
- Neruda en el corazón (Various artists) (2004) (Neruda in the heart)

== Filmography ==
- Morbo (1972) (with Ana Belén).
- Al diablo, con amor (1972) (with Ana Belén).
