= El Quinto Trago =

Studio album by Grupo Bryndis
- Released: May 2, 2004
- Genres: Romantic Music, Latin
- Label: Disa

Grupo Bryndis chronology
Memorias (2003)	El Quinto Trago (2004)	Por Muchas Razones Te Quiero (2005)

El Quinto Trago (Eng:The Fifth Drink) is a studio album released by Grupo Bryndis under Disa.

== Track listing ==
1. El Quinto Trago (Mauro Posadas)
2. La Ultima Canción (Carlos Roberto Nascimiento)
3. Tu Ausencia (Guadalupe Guevara)
4. La Vida Es Asi (Juan Guevara)
5. Yo Te Perdono (Claudio Pablo Montaño)
6. Sueño o Realidad (Guadalupe Guevara)
7. Una Vieja Canción de Amor (Abrahamzon, Ramírez)
8. Soledad (Mauro Posadas)
9. El Quinto Trago (Mauro Posadas)
10. Marchate (Mauro Posadas)
11. Fue un Sueño (Gerardo Izaguirre)
12. Otro Año (Juan Guevara)
13. Perdoname Mi Amor (Juan Guevara)
