= La Bomba (Azul Azul song) =

2000 single by Azul Azul

Single by Azul Azul

from the album El Sapo
- B-side: "Remix"
- Released: 1998
- Genre: Tropical
- Length: 2:03
- Label: Epic, Sony Discos
- Songwriter: Fabio Zambrana Marchetti

"La Bomba" (The Bomb) is the debut single released by Bolivian band Azul Azul. The song reached number 1 on the Billboard Top Latin Songs and Billboard Tropical Songs charts.

== Charts ==
| Chart (2001) | Peak position |
|---|---|
| Germany (GfK) | 98 |
| Hungary (Single Top 40) | 40 |
| Nicaragua (Notimex) | 1 |
| US Billboard Hot 100 | 70 |
| US Dance Club Songs (Billboard) | 26 |
| US Hot Latin Songs (Billboard) | 1 |

== Certifications ==
| Region | Certification | Certified units/sales |
|---|---|---|
| United States (RIAA) | Platinum (Latin) | 100,000 |

== King Africa cover version ==
"La Bomba"

Single by King Africa

from the album La Bomba
- B-side: "Remix"
- Released: 2000
- Recorded: 1999
- Length: 3:20
- Label: Universal, Sony
- Songwriter: Fabio Zambrana Marchetti
- Producer: Nicolás Guerrieri

King Africa singles chronology
| "La Bomba" (2000) | "Te ves buena" (2002) |

In 2000, the Argentine dance-pop music project titled King Africa, created in the early 1990s by singer Alan Duffy, released its single version of "La Bomba". King Africa's cover version was then re-issued in 2001 in more countries, including Switzerland, then re-issued again in 2003 in France. Throughout these re-issues, the King Africa version was a top-10 hit in France, Switzerland, Belgium (Flanders), and Italy.

A megamix available on the 12-inch maxi includes "Mama Yo Quiero", "Ciudad Maravillosa", "El Camaleon", "Bailando Pump It Up", "Salta" and "Toda España Esta Bailando".

=== Track listings ===
CD maxi

1. "La Bomba" (original radio mix) — 3:20
2. "La Bomba" (English radio mix) — 3:36
3. "La Bomba" (Caribe radio mix) — 3:53
4. "La Bomba" (extended mix) — 5:03
5. "La Bomba" (Caribe extended mix) — 5:47

CD maxi

1. "La Bomba" (radio edit) — 3:20
2. "La Bomba" (extended mix) — 5:01
3. "King Africa megamix" — 4:47
4. "Mama Yo Quiero" — 3:51

7-inch single

1. "La Bomba" (extended mix) — 5:00
2. "La Bomba" (radio mix) — 3:20

12-inch maxi

1. "La Bomba" — 3:20
2. "Mama Yo Quiero" — 3:51
3. "King Africa megamix" — 4:47
4. "Bailando Pump It Up" — 4:24

=== Charts and sales ===
==== Weekly charts ====
| Chart (2000) | Peak position |
|---|---|
| Austria (Ö3 Austria Top 40) | 21 |
| Belgium (Ultratop 50 Flanders) | 2 |
| Belgium (Ultratop 50 Wallonia) | 14 |
| France (SNEP) | 31 |
| Germany (GfK) | 27 |
| Italy (FIMI) | 10 |
| Netherlands (Dutch Top 40) | 5 |
| Netherlands (Single Top 100) | 3 |
| Spain (Promusicae) | 4 |
| Switzerland (Schweizer Hitparade) | 8 |
| Chart (2002/03) | Peak position |
| France (SNEP) | 4 |

==== Year-end charts ====
| Chart (2000) | Position |
|---|---|
| Belgium (Ultratop Flanders) | 17 |
| Belgium (Ultratop Wallonia) | 78 |
| Netherlands (Dutch Top 40) | 33 |
| Netherlands (Single Top 100) | 17 |
| Chart (2001) | Position |
| Switzerland (Schweizer Hitparade) | 61 |
| Chart (2002) | Position |
| Europe (Eurochart Hot 100 Singles) | 73 |
| France (SNEP) | 21 |

==== Decade-end charts ====
| Chart (2000–09) | Position |
|---|---|
| Netherlands (Single Top 100) | 86 |

==== Certifications ====
| Region | Certification | Certified units/sales |
|---|---|---|
| Belgium (BRMA) | Gold | 25,000^{*} |
| France (SNEP) | Gold | 250,000^{*} |
| Italy (FIMI) | Gold | 50,000^{‡} |
^{*} Sales figures based on certification alone.^{‡} Sales+streaming figures based on certification alone.

== Other versions ==
In 2001, the Brazilian group Braga Boys released their version of the song in Portuguese, titled "Uma Bomba", and it became a big hit in the country.

== See also ==
- List of number-one Billboard Hot Latin Tracks of 2001
- List of number-one Billboard Hot Tropical Songs of 2001
