= La Magía de Tu Amor =

La Magia de Tu Amor

Studio album by Grupo Bryndis
- Released: November 25, 2008
- Genre: Romantic music, Latin
- Label: EMI Latin

Grupo Bryndis chronology
El Grupo Que Le Canta Al Amor (2007)	La Magia de Tu Amor (2008)	Mas Alla Del Tiempo y La Distancia (2010)

La Magia de Tu Amor is a studio album released by Grupo Bryndis. All songs were composed by the group members. The last album with Guadalupe Guevara on vocals and Juan Guevara on drums.

== Track listing ==
No.	Title	Writer(s)	Length
1.	"Dime"	Henrique Adhemar Marques, Huelinton Cadorini Silva, Mauricio Gaetani DePinho	4:01
2.	"Dejame Ser"	Gerardo Izaguirre	3:14
3.	"Sueños"	Juan Guevara	3:44
4.	"La Magia de Tu Amor"	Juan Guevara	3:39
5.	"Sufriendo me Quede"	Claudio Pablo Montano	3:25
6.	"Bandido"	Mauro Posadas	3:44
7.	"Donde Estas Amor"	Guadalupe Guevara	3:34
8.	"Pensando En Tu Amor"	Guadalupe Guevara	4:09
9.	"Que Me Falto"	Mauro Posadas	3:07
10.	"Divorcio"	Mauro Posadas	4:00
11.	"Una Noche de Abril"	Juan guevara	4:06
12.	"Amor de Verdad"		3:46
