= Tu Amor Secreto =

Studio album by Grupo Bryndis
- Released: April 15, 1995
- Genres: Romantic Music, Latin
- Labels: FONO, a division of Universal Music Latino

Grupo Bryndis chronology
Por El Amor (1994)	Tu Amor Secreto (1995)	Mi Verdadero Amor (1996)

Tu Amor Secreto (Eng:Your Secret Love) is a studio album released by Grupo Bryndis. All tracks were composed by all members.

== Track list ==
1. Tu Traicion (Mauro Posadas)
2. Eres (Juan Guevara)
3. Secreto Amor (Mauro Posadas)
4. Tu Lugar Se Ocupo (Claudio Pablo)
5. Sabias Que Te Amo (Guadalupe Guevara)
6. Solo Te Amo A Ti (Mauro Posadas)
7. Quien Vive En Mi (Juan Guevara)
8. Extranandote (Juan Guevara)
9. Amor, Te Necesito (Guadalupe Guevara)
10. Cariño No Hay Soledad (Gerardo Izaguirre)
