= Inconfundible (Víctor Manuelle album) =

Studio album by Víctor Manuelle
- Released: September 28, 1999
- Genre: Salsa
- Length: 46:17
- Label: Sony Discos
- Producer: Sergio George, Victor Manuelle, Ramon Sanchez

Víctor Manuelle chronology
Ironias (1998)	Inconfundible (1999)	Instinto y Deseo (2001)

Singles from Inconfundible
- 1. "Pero Dile" Released: September 1999; 2. "Si La Ves" Released: April 2000; 3. "Como Duele" Released: July 2000; 4. "Como Quisiera Decirte" Released: 2000

Professional ratings
Review scores
Source	Rating
AllMusic	2.5/5 stars
Orlando Sentinel	4.5/5 stars

Inconfundible (Unmistakable) is the sixth studio album by the Puerto Rican salsa singer Víctor Manuelle, released on September 28, 1999.

== Track listing ==
This information adapted from AllMusic.

No.	Title	Writer(s)	Length
1.	"Si La Ves"	Omar Alfanno	4:42
2.	"Al Igual Que Ayer"	Gil Francisco	4:34
3.	"Por Ella"	Ramon Rodriguez	4:40
4.	"Pero Dile"	Victor Manuelle	4:55
5.	"Cuando Tu Amor Se Acabe"	Alejandro Jaen	4:34
6.	"Si Por Ti Fuera"	Miguel Diaz	4:32
7.	"Como Quisiera Decirte"	Francisco Salinas	4:13
8.	"Como Duele"	Alejandro Jaen	4:55
9.	"Por Ti"	Budy Richards	4:38
10.	"Bella Sin Alma"	A. Casella, Riccardo Cocciante, Marco Luberti	4:34

== Personnel ==
- Composer – Alejandro Jaén
- Trombone – Antonio Vazquez
- Graphic Design – Aramis Negrón
- Bajo Sexto – Carlos Henriquez
- Percussion, Timbales – Chago Martínez
- Image Design – Cinthia Rodríguez
- Photography – Eduardo Pérez
- Composer – Francisco Salinas
- Assistant – Gerardo Lopez
- Composer – Gil Francisco
- Guitar – Ito Serrano
- Coros – Johnny Rivera
- Coros – Julio Barreto
- Mixing – Kurt Upper
- Piano – Lisandro Arias
- Trumpet – Luis Aquino
- Coros – Luis Daniel Cabarcas
- Congas, Timbales – Marc Quiñones
- Composer – Marco Luberti
- Engraving – Mario DeJesús
- Hair Stylist – Martha Medina
- Composer – Omar Alfanno
- Coros – Osvaldo Roman
- Trombone – Ozzie Melendez
- Congas – Papo Pepin
- Graphic Design – Rachid Molinary
- Coros – Ramón Rodríguez
- Arreglos, Keyboards, Producer – Ramón Sánchez
- Trumpet – Raul Agraz
- Bongos – Ray Colón
- Baritone – Ricardo S. Pons
- Composer – Riccardo Cocciante
- Bongos, Percussion – Robert Vilera
- Engineer – Ronnie Torres
- Bajo Sexto – Rubén Rodríguez
- Coros, Direction, Keyboards, Piano, Producer – Sergio George
- Trumpet – Vicente Cusi Castillo
- Composer – Víctor Manuel
- Arreglos, Composer, Primary Artist, Producer – Víctor Manuelle
- Trumpet – Ángel "Angie" Machado
- Baritone Saxophone – Ángel Torres

== Charts ==
Chart (1999)	Peak position
US Billboard 200	96
US Top Latin Albums (Billboard)	2
US Tropical Albums (Billboard)	1

== Certification ==
Region	Certification	Certified units/sales
United States (RIAA)	2× Platinum (Latin)	200,000^{^}
^{^} Shipments figures based on certification alone.

== See also ==
- List of number-one Billboard Tropical Albums from the 1990s
