= Siempre Contigo (song) =

1994 song by Lucero

Single by Lucero

from the album Siempre Contigo
- Released: October 1994
- Recorded: 1994
- Genre: Latin pop
- Length: 4:11
- Label: Fonovisa Records
- Composer: Rafael Pérez-Botija
- Producer: Rafael Pérez-Botija

Lucero singles chronology
"Me Estás Quemando" (1994)	"Siempre Contigo" (1994)	"¿Quién Soy Yo?" (1995)

"Siempre Contigo" ("Always with You") is a written and produced by Rafael Pérez-Botija and performed by Mexican entertainer Lucero on the 1994 album of the same name. It was released as a lead single on the days leading up to the release date of the album. The song, along with the entire album, marked a return for Lucero to recording ballads following her ranchera album, Cariño de Mis Cariños, also released in the same year. Pérez-Botija had previously collaborated with Lucero composing hit songs like "Electricidad". The song became her first and (to date) only number one hit on the Billboard Latin Pop Airplay chart in 1995. The song has been covered by Tejana singer Emily on her 1999 album of the same name. In 2023, Lucero released a poorly mixed version of the track entitled "Siempre Contigo (Lucero Contigo)" to thank the fans who have been supporting her "since day one", according to El Informador.

== Charts ==
=== Weekly charts ===
Chart (1995)	Peak position
US Hot Latin Songs (Billboard)	4
US Latin Pop Airplay (Billboard)	1

=== Year-end charts ===
Chart (1995)	Peak position
US Hot Latin Songs (Billboard)	23
US Latin Pop Airplay (Billboard)	2

== See also ==
- List of number-one Billboard Latin Pop Airplay songs of 1995
