= Super Ratones =

Band from Argentina

Los Súper Ratones
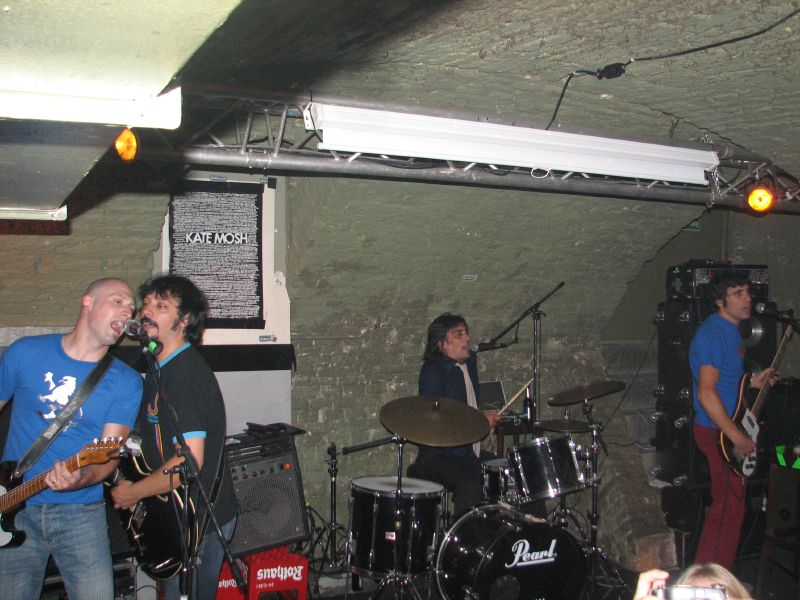
- Súper Ratones in live, 2006.

Background information
- Origin: Mar del Plata, Argentina
- Genres: Rock and roll Pop music Rockabilly
- Years active: 1985–present
- Label: EMI
- Members: Oscar Granieri (guitar and voice); Mario Barassi (guitar and voice); Pablo Díaz (bass and voice); Agustín Insausti (keyboard and voice)
- Past members: José Luis Properzi (drums and voice) †; Fernando Blanco (bass and voice); Fernando Ronnie Astone (bass and voice)

Súper Ratones (in English The Super Mice) is a musical group of Argentine rock and pop style from Mar del Plata and established in 1985.

== History ==
This group was born in the city of Mar del Plata in 1985 to José Luis "Person" Properzi (drums and vocals), Fernando Blanco (bass and vocals) and Oscar Granieri (guitar and vocals), and an additional guitarist named Juan Carlos Raising and called themselves simply Los Ratones (The Mice). In 1988, they were joined by guitarist Mario Barassi, being like a quartet stable. They won the award for revelation band Youth Festival and in 1988, the group added the final name: Súper Ratones. After five years of presentations by the coast, they signed a contract for the debut album, Rock Beach, which managed to be sold as gold.

On November 3, 2015, its founder and lead singer, José Luis "Person" Properzi, died of cancer at 48 years old.

== Musical style ==
His music was strongly influenced by artistes of the 1950s and 1960s, such as Elvis Presley, Jerry Lee Lewis, The Beach Boys, The Beatles, Johnny Rivers, among others.

== Discography ==
Year	Album	Label
1990	Rock de la Playa	Barca Discos
1991	Segundo tiempo	Barca Discos
1993	Aire para respirar	Barca Discos
1995	Reciclable	Barca Discos
1996	Zapping Club	Barca Discos
1998	Autopistas y túneles	Barca Discos
2000	Mancha registrada	EMI
2003	Urgente	EMI
2008	Super Ratones	Nacho Records/Pop Art
