= List of number-one albums of 2001 (Spain) =

The List of number-one albums of 2001 in Spain is derived from the Top 100 España record chart published weekly by PROMUSICAE (Productores de Música de España), a non-profit organization composed by Spain and multinational record companies. This association tracks record sales (physical and digital) in Spain.

== Albums ==
Week	Chart Date	Album	Artist	Reference
1	January 1	Estopa	Estopa	
2	January 8	Estopa	Estopa	
3	January 15	El viaje de Copperpot	La Oreja de Van Gogh	
4	January 22	JLO	Jennifer López	
5	January 29	JLO	Jennifer López	
6	February 5	El viaje de Copperpot	La Oreja de Van Gogh	
7	February 12	De Vuelta y Vuelta	Jarabe de Palo	
8	February 19	De Vuelta y Vuelta	Jarabe de Palo	
9	February 26	El viaje de Copperpot	La Oreja de Van Gogh	
10	March 5	El viaje de Copperpot	La Oreja de Van Gogh	
11	March 12	El viaje de Copperpot	La Oreja de Van Gogh	
12	March 19	El viaje de Copperpot	La Oreja de Van Gogh	
13	March 26	El viaje de Copperpot	La Oreja de Van Gogh	
14	April 2	El viaje de Copperpot	La Oreja de Van Gogh	
15	April 9	El viaje de Copperpot	La Oreja de Van Gogh	
16	April 16	El viaje de Copperpot	La Oreja de Van Gogh	
17	April 23	El viaje de Copperpot	La Oreja de Van Gogh	
18	April 30 ]	El viaje de Copperpot	La Oreja de Van Gogh	
19	May 7	El viaje de Copperpot	La Oreja de Van Gogh	
20	May 14	Nunca el Tiempo es Perdido	Manolo García	
21	May 21	Nunca el Tiempo es Perdido	Manolo García	
22	May 28	Nunca el Tiempo es Perdido	Manolo García	
23	June 4	Próxima Estación: Esperanza	Manu Chao	
24	June 11	Nunca el Tiempo es Perdido	Manolo García	
25	June 18	Nunca el Tiempo es Perdido	Manolo García	
26	June 25	Haciendo Trampas	Raúl	
27	July 2	Haciendo Trampas	Raúl	
28	July 9	Bridget Jones Diary BSO	Various Artists	
29	July 16	Haciendo Trampas	Raúl	
30	July 23	Bridget Jones Diary BSO	Varios Artistas	
31	July 30	Bridget Jones Diary BSO	Varios Artistas	
32	August 6	Los Caños	Los Caños	
33	August 13	Los Caños	Los Caños	
34	August 20	Los Caños	Los Caños	
35	August 27	Los Caños	Los Caños	
36	September 3	Las Margaritas Son Flores del Campo	Mojinos Escozíos	
37	September 10	Las Margaritas Son Flores del Campo	Mojinos Escozíos	
38	September 17	I Was Dead for 7 Weeks in the City of Angels	Dover	
39	September 24	Amor.Com	Camela	
40	October 1	Amor.Com	Camela	
41	October 8	Amor.Com	Camela	
42	October 15	Rosana	Rosana	
43	October 22	Mujer	Varios Artistas	
44	October 29	Destrangis	Estopa	
45	November 5	Destrangis	Estopa	
46	November 12	Servicio de Lavandería	Shakira	
47	November 19	MTV Unplugged	Alejandro Sanz	
48	November 26	MTV Unplugged	Alejandro Sanz	
49	December 3	Singles Gala 5	Operación Triunfo	
50	December 10	El Álbum	Operación Triunfo	
51	December 17	El Álbum	Operación Triunfo	
52	December 24	El Álbum	Operación Triunfo	
53	December 31	El Álbum	Operación Triunfo	

== See also ==
- List of number-one singles of 2001 (Spain)
