= Instinto y Deseo =

Studio album by Víctor Manuelle
- Released: January 30, 2001
- Recorded: July–October 2000
- Studio: Rolo Studio, San Juan, Puerto Rico
- Genre: Salsa; Latin pop
- Length: 45:38
- Language: Spanish
- Label: Sony Discos
- Producer: José Manuel Lugo

Víctor Manuelle chronology
Inconfundible (1999)	Instinto y Deseo (2001)	Le Preguntaba a la Luna (2002)

Singles from Instinto y Deseo
- 1. "Me Da Lo Mismo" Released: January 8, 2001; 2. "Cómo Se Lo Explico al Corazón" Released: February 12, 2001; 3. "Quisiera Inventar" Released: May 21, 2001; 4. "Instinto y Deseo" Released: August 16, 2001

Professional ratings
Review scores
Source	Rating
AllMusic	4/5 stars

Instinto y Deseo (transl. "Instinct and Desire") is the seventh studio album by Puerto Rican singer Víctor Manuelle. It was released on January 30, 2001 through Sony Discos. This album became his first number-one album in the Billboard Top Latin Albums. Also received a Billboard Latin Music Award nomination for Tropical/Salsa Album of the Year, Male, which was awarded to Libre by Marc Anthony.

== Track listing ==
1. No Eres la Mujer (Diego Javier González) — 4:49
2. Me Da lo Mismo (Omar Alfanno) — 4:32
3. Lejos (Ramón Rodríguez) — 4:50
4. Cómo Se lo Explico al Corazón (Héctor Rivera) — 4:41
5. Quisiera Inventar (Diego Javier González) — 4:40
6. Te Voy an Encontrar (Omar Alfanno) — 4:48
7. Instinto y Deseo (Salsa version) (Héctor Gustavo) — 4:23
8. Ni Un Día Más (Gustavo Márquez) — 4:31
9. Así Fué (Juan Gabriel) — 4:44
10. Instinto y Deseo (Pop version) — 4:23

== Personnel ==
This information from Allmusic.

- Trombone - Antonio Tonito Vasquez
- Arranger, Bass - Bobby Valentin
- Bongos - Carmelo Alvarez
- Percussion, Timbales - Chago Martinez
- Composer - Diego Javier Gonzalez
- Arranger - Ernesto Sanchez
- Digital Art - Frank Gener Villar
- Bass - Gilberto Mendez
- Guest Artist - Gilberto Santa Rosa
- Composer - Gustavo Marquez
- Composer - Hector Rivera
- Trumpet - Jan Duclerc
- Background Vocals - Johnny Rivera
- Transcription - Johnny Torres
- Trombone - Jorge Diaz
- Arranger, Keyboards, Piano, Producer - Jose Lugo
- Composer - Juan Gabriel
- Trumpet - Luis "Perico" Ortiz
- Bongos, Congas, Guest Artist, Timbales - Marc Quinones
- Make-Up, Stylist - Martha Medina
- Composer - Omar Alfanno
- Copyist - Osvaldo De La Rosa
- Composer - Ramon Rodriguez
- Arranger - Roberto Perez
- Engineer - Rolando Alejandro
- Arranger, Trumpet - Tommy Villarini
- Photography - Tony Vera
- Trumpet - Vicente Cusi Castillo
- Arranger, Primary Artist - Victor Manuelle
- Baritone Saxophone - Angel Torres

== Chart performance ==
Chart (2001)	Peak position
US Billboard 200	197
US Top Latin Albums (Billboard)	1
US Tropical Albums (Billboard)	1

== Sales and certifications ==
Region	Certification	Certified units/sales
United States (RIAA)	Platinum (Latin)	100,000^{^}
^{^} Shipments figures based on certification alone.

== See also ==
- List of number-one Billboard Top Latin Albums of 2001
- List of number-one Billboard Tropical Albums from the 2000s
