= Historia de un Ídolo, Vol. 1 =

Historia de Un Ídolo, Vol. 1

Greatest hits album by Vicente Fernández
- Released: November 21, 2000
- Recorded: 1960–1998
- Genre: Mariachi
- Length: 53:21
- Label: Sony Music Latin

Vicente Fernández chronology
Lobo Herido (2000)	Historia de Un Ídolo, Vol. 1 (2000)	El Mayor de los Potrillos (2001)

Professional ratings
Review scores
Source	Rating
Allmusic	4/5 stars

Historia de Un Ídolo, Vol. 1 (Eng.: History of an Idol, Vol. 1) is a compilation album by Mexican singer and actor Vicente Fernández, it was released in 2000. The album peaked at #1 on the Billboard Top Latin Albums chart in 2001 and 2007. As of October 2017, it is the fifth best-selling Latin album in the United States.

== Track listing ==
Track listing from Billboard.com.

1. Lástima Que Seas Ajena (Jorge Massias) — 4:16
2. La Ley del Monte (José A. Espinoza "Ferrusquilla") — 3:24
3. Aunque Mal Paguen Ellas (Duet with Roberto Carlos) (Federico Méndez) — 3:25
4. El Hijo del Pueblo (José Alfredo Jiménez) — 2:41
5. Acá Entre Nos (Martin Urieta) — 3:13
6. Ni en Defensa Propia (Ramón Ortega Contreras) — 2:24
7. Que de Raro Tiene (Martin Urieta) — 3:19
8. Me Voy a Quitar de en Medio (Manuel Monterrosas) — 2:44
9. Hoy Platiqué Con Mi Gallo (Federico Méndez) — 3:37
10. Nos Estorbó La Ropa (Teodoro Bello) — 3:02
11. Palabra de Rey (Antonio Valdés Herrera) — 2:28
12. Las Llaves de Mi Alma (Vicente Fernández) — 2:56
13. Por Tu Maldito Amor (Federico Méndez/Vicente Fernández) — 3:56
14. Mi Viejo (José Piero) — 3:12
15. La Diferencia (Juan Gabriel) — 2:50
16. Mujeres Divinas (Martin Urieta) — 3:12
17. Hermoso Cariño (Fernando Maldonado) — 2:34

== Chart performance ==
Chart (2001)	Peak position
US Billboard Top Latin Albums	1
US Billboard Regional Mexican Albums	1
US Billboard Heatseekers	13

Chart (2007)	Peak position
US Billboard Top Latin Albums	1
US Billboard Regional Mexican Albums	1
US Billboard 200	81

== Sales and certifications ==
Region	Certification	Certified units/sales
Mexico (AMPROFON)	2× Platinum	300,000^{^}
United States (RIAA)	Gold	1,242,000
^{^} Shipments figures based on certification alone.

== See also ==
- List of best-selling Latin albums in the United States
