= Azul Azul =

1990–2011, 2022-Present Bolivian pop-rock-dance group

- Born: 1990 (age 34–35)
- Origin: Santa Cruz de la Sierra, Bolivia
- Genres: Pop music, Latin music
- Years active: 1990—2011; 2022—Present
- Members: Fabio Zambrana Marchetti; Marcos Justiniano Lea Plaza; Luis Fernando Nandy Justiniano; Martín Paúl Espada Flores
- Website: www.azulazul.com

Azul Azul is a pop-rock-dance group formed in Santa Cruz de la Sierra, Bolivia in the early 1990s. Azul Azul had their major breakthrough in 1995 with a song called El Huevo (Spanish for "The Egg"). Azul Azul launched albums the following years 1995, 1997, 1999, 2001, 2003 and 2006.

Azul Azul's second breakthrough in Latin America came with the hit song "La Bomba", which was later covered by King Africa. King Africa's cover became a massive hit in Spain and many other European countries. The Azul Azul album "El Sapo" has sold about 300,000 copies worldwide according to Sony Latin America.
