= Siempre Contigo (Lucero album) =

Studio album by Lucero
- Released: November 15, 1994
- Recorded: 1994
- Genre: Pop
- Label: Melody
- Producer: Rafael Pérez Botija

Lucero chronology
'Cariño De Mis Cariños' (1994)	Siempre Contigo (1994)	'Lazos de Amor' (1995)

Singles from Siempre Contigo
- 1. "Siempre contigo" Released: September 12, 1994; 2. "¿Quién soy yo?" Released: January 16, 1995; 3. "Palabras" Released: February 13, 1995; 4. "Como perro al sol" Released: March 20, 1995; 5. "Volvamos a empezar" Released: May 8, 1995

Siempre Contigo (English: Always With You) is the twelfth album from Mexican singer and actress Lucero. It was released in 1994, selling more than 700,000 units till today in Mexico and United States. It reached #15 in Billboard Top Latin Albums.

This was the third album written, produced, and arranged by Rafael Pérez Botija for the singer, and was another success for both. The producer also presented another song to be included called "Un Mundo sin Amor" (A World Without Love), but since the singer decided that this album was about victorious love, the song was not included. Lucero told Mexican magazine Eres that she was very proud of this album because it had something for everybody, and was an album to be played in every home for the whole family.

The first single was the title track "Siempre Contigo" which hit No. 1 in Mexico and No. 4 in United States. Once again Lucero was face to face with Luis Miguel for the top of the Mexican charts. "Siempre Contigo" was at No. 1 for 3 weeks, when Luis Miguel's "El Día Que Me Quieras" hit the top spot.

With the release of the second single ("Quién Soy Yo", English: Who Am I), Lucero had to settle for the #2 rug of the charts, because of Luis Miguel's "La Media Vuelta".

By the time of the release of the third single "Palabras" (English: Words), she spent 5 weeks at the top. Also a fourth and a fifth single were taken from the album: "Como Perro al Sol" and "Volvamos a Empezar".

Lucero was starring in 1995 on the soap opera Lazos de Amor and a re-release of the album was planned to include the song "Lazos de Amor" and increase sales (the album at the time had 350,000 copies sold), however the plans were dropped and instead an EP with the song and 4 instrumental tracks was released.

== Track listing ==
The album is composed by 11 songs, all of them were arranged and produced by Rafael Pérez Botija.

No.	Title	Writer(s)	Length
1.	"Volvamos a empezar"	Rafael Pérez Botija	3:43
2.	"Como perro al sol"	Rafael Pérez Botija	3:34
3.	"24 horas"	Rafael Pérez Botija	3:58
4.	"¿Quién soy yo?"	Rafael Pérez Botija	4:03
5.	"Alguien"	Rafael Pérez Botija	3:22
6.	"Te extraño tanto"	Rafael Pérez Botija	4:13
7.	"Palabras"	Rafael Pérez Botija	4:33
8.	"Déjame ir"	Rafael Pérez Botija	4:37
9.	"Regresar"	Rafael Pérez Botija	4:50
10.	"Fotografíame"	Rafael Pérez Botija	3:59
11.	"Siempre contigo"	Rafael Pérez Botija	4:11

== Singles ==
#	Title	Mexico	United States Hot Lat.	United States Lat.Air	Argentina	Costa Rica	Colombia	Peru	Nicaragua
1.	"Palabras"	#1	n/a	n/a	#16	#9	#13	#8	#2
2.	"Siempre contigo"	#1	#4	#1	#5	#1	#2	#1	#1
3.	"Como perro al sol"	#20	#7	n/a	#39	n/a	#28	#43	#15
4.	"¿Quién soy yo?"	#2	#24	#12	#15	#10	#20	#19	#7
5.	"Volvamos a empezar"	#19	n/a	n/a	n/a	n/a	#30	n/a	#2

== Chart performance ==
This was the 6th album of Lucero that entered to the list of Billboard. The album peaked No. 15 for one week.

Chart	Peak
Billboard Latin Pop Albums	15

== Credits ==
=== Personnel ===
- Recorded at: Criteria (Miami), Record One (LA) Smecky (Prague), Kirios (Madrid)
- Recording engineers: Carlos Nieto, Ray Pyle, Javier Vacas, Juraj Durovic.
- Mixing: Kirios Studios by Carlos Nieto
- Mastering: Steve Marcussen
- Arrangements, piano, keyboards and programming: Rafael Perez Botija
- All vocals: Lucero
- Photography: Adolfo Perez Butron
- Wardrobe: Frattina

=== Musicians ===
- Bass: Neil Stubenhaus
- Drums: Mike Bayrd
- Guitars: Tim Pierce, Jose Antonio Barrera, Rene Toledo
- Metals: Ed Calles
- Sax: Tony Concepción
- Trumpet: Jim Hacker
- Strings: Philharmonic Orchestra of Prague. Director: Mario Klemens
