= Homenaje a Chalino Sánchez =

Studio album by El Original de la Sierra
- Released: June 12, 2001
- Genre: Norteño
- Label: Universal Music Mexico

El Original de la Sierra chronology
Homenaje a Chalino Sánchez (2001)	Ranchero y Mucho Más (2002)

Homenaje a Chalino Sánchez (Eng.: Homage to Chalino Sánchez') is the title of a studio album released by Regional Mexican artist Jessie Morales as El Original de la Sierra on June 12, 2001. This album became his first number-one hit on the Billboard Top Latin Albums chart. It is a tribute album to the late mexican singer-songwriter Chalino Sánchez.

== Track listing ==
This information from Billboard.com and Allmusic.

1. Homenaje a Chalino Sánchez (Jessie Morales) – 3:29
2. Gallo de Sinaloa (Chalino Sánchez) – 3:18
3. El Melón – 2:46
4. Rafael Villareal (Chalino Sánchez) – 3:05
5. Bandido Generoso (Chalino Sánchez) – 3:11
6. Anastacio Pacheco (Chalino Sánchez) – 3:35
7. Mi Compa Chalino (Hernández/Reyes) – 2:24
8. El Original (Jessie Morales) – 2:36
9. Jorge Casares (feat. El Jilguero) (Chalino Sánchez) – 2:39
10. Florita del Alma (Jesús Cabral) – 3:32
11. Nieves de Enero (Mario Molina Montes) – 3:14
12. Alma Enamorada (performed by Chalino Sánchez) (Rafael Elizondo) – 2:17

== Chart performance ==
Chart (2001)	Peak position
US Billboard Top Latin Albums	1
US Billboard Regional/Mexican Albums	1
US Billboard 200	146

== Sales and certifications ==
Region	Certification	Certified units/sales
United States (RIAA)	Platinum (Latin)	100,000^{^}
^{^} Shipments figures based on certification alone.
