= Sólo pienso en ti (Víctor Manuel song) =

Single by Víctor Manuel

from the album Soy un corazón tendido al sol
- Released: 1979
- Recorded: 1978
- Length: 4:10
- Label: CBS
- Songwriter: Víctor Manuel
- Producer: Danilo Vaona

"Sólo pienso en ti" is a 1979 hit song sung and composed by Víctor Manuel. The song was written in 1978, but was first released on the album Soy un corazón tendido al sol in 1979, which was recorded in Milan with producer Danilo Vaona. The song reached the top of the charts in Spain and is considered by many to be his best song.

It tells the story of an actual couple with intellectual disabilities, who 'kept their love over all legal and social obstacles their reached in 1978'. The couple, Mari Luz and Antonio, got married soon after that, and have three children, one of who studied at the university. Víctor Manuel knew the story while reading a newspaper when waiting to sing in a concert.

In 2004 it was chosen as the 6th most popular song in Spanish on the TVE program Nuestra mejor canción. In 2010 Rolling Stone placed the song 196 on its all-time 200 best songs of Spanish pop-rock. Also in 2010 the Fundación Crisálida honoured Víctor Manuel, and Judith Colell filmed a documentary based on the song, also titled Sólo pienso en ti.

== Cover versions ==
- Raúl Di Blasio (on Alrededor del mundo, 1983). Versión instrumental.
- Manzanita. (Sólo pienso en ti, 1995).
- Chayanne. (on Volver a nacer, 1996).
- Lynda Thomas. (promotional single, 1998). orchestral arrangement
- Juan Antonio Valderrama. (on Infancia olvidada, 2003).
- Ana Torroja. (on Nuestra mejor canción, 2004).
- Guillermo Dávila. (on Las mejores canciones del mundo, 2007).
- Melendi. (on Aún más curiosa la cara de tu padre, 2009).
