= Pachanga (album) =

Studio album by King África
- Released: August 6, 2001
- Recorded: 2000–2001
- Genre: Dance-pop, tropical
- Label: Fonovisa Inc.

King África chronology
La Bomba (Grandes éxitos) (2000)	Pachanga (2001)	Energía (2002)

Pachanga is the seventh full-length studio album by Argentine pop singer King África. The album was released in Spain, Argentina and the US in 2001 through Vale Music. It includes the songs "Se mueve" and the original mix of "Salta" from the album "El Africano" (1993).

== Track listing ==
No.	Title	Writer(s)	Length
1.	"Se viene K. A."	N. Guerrieri	0:25
2.	"El humahuaqueño"	E. Zaldivar	3:31
3.	"Que me pincha el cardo"	P. Marcovsky	3:13
4.	"Bomba bomba"	N. Guerrieri	3:37
5.	"¿Querías K. A.?"	N. Guerrieri	0:18
6.	"Comadre, compadre"	Rivanil	4:06
7.	"Mayonesa"	Jasa - Britos - Cáceres	3:53
8.	"Johanna"	N. Guerrieri - A. Guerrieri	4:04
9.	"El meneaito"	M. Brown	4:00
10.	"La pachanga"	Gómez - Rizzo	4:28
11.	"Whisky a gogó"	Sullivan - Massadas	4:25
12.	"Africanos, a la pista"	N. Guerrieri - A. Guerrieri	4:17
13.	"Muévelo"	E. A. Franco	4:00
14.	"Allá en el rancho grande"	Folk music / Arrangements: N. Guerrieri	3:03
15.	"Españoles, a bailar"	N. Guerrieri	4:17
16.	"Se mueve"	N. Guerrieri - A. Guerrieri	4:37

Bonus Tracks
No.	Title	Writer(s)	Length
17.	"Salta" (Original Mix)	N. Guerrieri - A. Guerrieri	3:49
18.	"Salta" (Remix 2001)	N. Guerrieri - A. Guerrieri	3:35
Total length:			60:03

== Certifications ==
Region	Certification	Certified units/sales
Spain (PROMUSICAE)	Gold	50,000^{^}
^{^} Shipments figures based on certification alone.

== Awards ==
This album was nominated by Billboard magazine as "Album of the Year" as Pachanga reached the top 10 selling album. Billboard also nominated King África as "Best Pop Artist revelation to Billboard Latin Awards" that same year. In Spain, Pachanga achieved the "Disco de Oro", an award for top selling artists.
