= En el Idioma del Amor =

En El Idioma del Amor

Studio album by Grupo Bryndis
- Released: September 25, 2001
- Genre: Balada, Cumbia
- Label: Disa Records

Grupo Bryndis chronology
| Historia Musical Romántica (2001) | En El Idioma del Amor (2001) | Hablando de Amor: Poemas (2002) |

En El Idioma del Amor (Eng.: In the Language of Love') is the title of a studio album released by romantic music ensemble Grupo Bryndis. This album became their second number-one hit on the Billboard Top Latin Albums chart.

== Track listing ==
This information from Billboard.com

1. Vas a Sufrir (Mauro Posadas) — 3:46
2. Un Brindis Por Tí (Juan Guevara) — 3:51
3. Te Amo, Te Extraño (Mauro Posadas) — 3:56
4. Se Marchó (Guadalupe Guevara) — 3:19
5. Felicidad (Juan Guevara) — 3:45
6. La Pregunta (Mauro Posadas) — 4:04
7. El Idioma del Amor (Juan Guevara) — 3:58
8. Yo Te Amaré (Claudio Pablo Montaño) — 3:38
9. Mañana Partiré (Guadalupe Guevara) — 3:37
10. Quisiera Olvidarte (Gerardo Izaguirre) — 3:29

== Chart performance ==
| Chart (2001) | Peak position |
|---|---|
| US Billboard Top Latin Albums | 1 |
| US Billboard Regional/Mexican Albums | 1 |
| US Billboard 200 | 169 |
