= Jessie Morales =

American singer

- Also known as: El Original de la Sierra
- Born: January 10, 1983 (age 43); Los Angeles, California, US
- Genres: Regional Mexican, West Coast hip hop
- Occupation: Musician
- Years active: 1999-present

Jessie Morales (born January 10, 1983), also known as El Original de la Sierra, is an American singer and rapper. He was inspired by the 1970s and raised in Los Angeles, California, making his debut as a singer at the age of 14. Even when he grew up listening to West Coast rap, the young artist started singing traditional Mexican music. Morales' Homenaje a Chalino Sánchez, released in June 2001 by Univision Music Group, climbed to the top on Billboard's Latin 50. He graduated from Thomas Jefferson High School.

== Discography ==
- 1999 El Retén de la Sierra (First album)
- 2000 Cheque al portador-Los vergelitos
- 2000 El Original
- 2001 Te he prometido
- 2001 16 Super Exitos
- 2001 Loco
- 2001 Homenaje a Chalino Sánchez
- 2002 Ranchero y mucho más
- 2003 Sigo Siendo Original
- 2004 Amor de Estudiante
- 2005 Regresa Con 100% Norteño
- 2006 Sigo En La Jugada
- 2007 Aqui Estoy de Nuevo
- 2007 Tu Recuerdo
- 2008 Epoca Dorada
- 2010 La Desvelada
