= Historia Musical Romántica =

Compilation album by Grupo Bryndis
- Released: June 26, 2001
- Genres: Balada, Cumbia
- Label: Disa

Grupo Bryndis chronology
Por el Pasado (2000)	Historia Musical Romántica (2001)	En El Idioma del Amor (2001)

Historia Musical Romántica (Eng.: Romantic Music History') is a compilation album released by romantic music group Grupo Bryndis. This album became their first number-one hit on the Billboard Top Latin Albums chart. The 30 tracks in this compilation were remixed and shortened.

== Track listing ==
This information from Billboard.com

No.	Title	Writer(s)	Length
1.	"Te Vas Con Él"	Mauro Posadas	2:20
2.	"Te Esperaré"	Mauro Posadas	2:25
3.	"La Luz de Mi Vida"	Juan Guevara	1:00
4.	"Entre Tú y Yo"	Mauro Posadas	2:20
5.	"Amor Prohibido"	Mauro Posadas	3:20
6.	"Regresa"	Lupe Guevara	1:10
7.	"Otro Ocupa Mi Lugar"	Miguel Gallardo	1:28
8.	"Qué Más Te Da"	Camilo Sesto	1:33
9.	"Y Todo Acabó"	Lupe Guevara, Juan Guevara, Mauro Posadas	1:13
10.	"Te Juro Que Te Amo"	Bruno Lauzi, Giulio Rapetti, Oscar Prudente	3:02
11.	"Tú Traición"	Mauro Posadas	3:17
12.	"Solo Te Amo A Ti"	Mauro Posadas	1:55
13.	"Mi Verdadero Amor"	Claudio Pablo Montaño	1:50
14.	"Por Estar Pensando En Ti"	Mauro Posadas	2:05
15.	"Olvidemos Nuestro Orgullo"	Mauro Posadas	3:00
16.	"Así Es El Amor"	Gerardo Izaguirre	3:33
17.	"Volvamos A Empezar"	Mauro Posadas	3:20
18.	"Cuando Vuelvas Tú"	Lupe Guevara	3:50
19.	"Regresa A Mí"	Mauro Posadas	2:15
20.	"Por Qué Me Enamoré"	Lupe Guevara	1:35
21.	"Pagando Mi Pasado"	Mauro Posadas	1:49
22.	"Una Aventura Más"	Juan Guevara	1:28
23.	"Sin Ti"	Mauro Posadas	1:51
24.	"Perdóname"	Mauro Posadas	1:20
25.	"Me Hace Falta Tu Amor"	Juan Guevara	1:46
26.	"Secreto Amor"	Mauro Posadas	2:07
27.	"Quién Vive En Mí"	Juan Guevara	1:07
28.	"Te He Prometido"	Leo Dan	1:00
29.	"Lo Nuestro Terminó"	Mauro Posadas	2:00
30.	"Vete Ya"	Juan Guevara	1:39

== Chart performance ==
Chart (2001)	Peak position
US Billboard 200	152
US Billboard Top Latin Albums	1
US Billboard Regional/Mexican Albums	1
