= Los Ángeles de Charly =

Mexican cumbia group

Los Angeles de Charly is a Mexican cumbia group led by vocalist Carlos Becies. The group was formed in February of 1999, after Charly Becies and fellow vocalists Guillermo "Memo" Palafox and Jonathan Martínez left the popular band Los Ángeles Azules. They quickly became one of the leading acts in the romantic Mexican cumbia genre. In 2000, the group's ten-track album Un Sueño peaked at No. 29 on the Billboard Independent Albums chart. Their follow-up album Te Voy a Enamorar was released in 2001 and went on to be number one on the Billboard Top Latin Albums chart.

== Discography ==
- La Magia Del Amor (1999)
- Un Sueño (2000)
- Te Voy A Enamorar (2001)
- Bonita Mujer (2002)
- Recuerdos (2003)
- Carta De Amor (2003)
- Cuando Te Enamoras (2005)
- Un Tiempo, Un Estilo, Un Amor (2006)
- En Vivo, Teatro, Gran Rex (2006)
- Mi eterno Amor Secreto (2007)
- Luna Desnuda (2008)
- En Vivo Sus Grandes Exitos (2008)
- Recuerdos Y Amores (2011)
- Romántico (2019)

== Studio albums ==
- La Magia Del Amor (1999)
- Un Sueño (2000)
- Te Voy A Enamorar (2001)
- Bonita Mujer (2002)
- Recuerdos (2003)
- Carta De Amor (2003)
- Cuando Te Enamoras (2005)
- Un Tiempo Un Estilo Un Amor(2006)
- En Vivo Teatro Gran Rex(2006)
- Mi Eterno Amor Secreto (2007)
- Luna Desnuda (2008) Last Album On Fonovisa
- En Vivo Sus Grandes Exitos(2008)
- Amores Y Recuerdos (2011) Titanio Records
- Romántico (2019) Gerencia 360

== Direct albums ==
- DVD En Vivo Teatro Gran Rex (2006) (Only for Sale in Argentina [Barca Records])
- En Vivo Sus Grandes Exitos (2008)
- Grandes Éxitos En Vivo en Scombro Bailable y La Mira (2011) [Garra Records]

== Compilations ==
- Juntos Por Primera Vez/Con Grupo Mandingo. (2002)Fonovisa
- Encuentro De Angeles Volumen 01/Con Los Angeles Azules. (2003) Disa/Fonovisa
- De Recuerdos y Amores 20 Grandes Éxitos Románticos. (2005) Fonovisa
- Greatest Hits/Con Grupo Aroma [CD+DVD]. (2005) Fonovisa
- Encuentro De Angeles Volumen 02/Con Los Angeles Azules. (2006) Disa/Fonovisa
- Encuentro Sonidero/Con Grupo Aroma. (2006) Fonovisa
- Para Ti Nuestra Historia [2CDS+Entrevistas]. (2006) Fonovisa
- La Mejor Coleccion (30 Super Exitos) [2CD]. (2007) Fonovisa
- 15 Autenticos Exitos. (2008) Fonovisa.
- Las Número 1.(2008)Fonovisa/Univision Records
- Oro Grupero/Con Los Angeles Azules. (2008)UMG Records/Universal Music Distribution. (Only Available On USA).
- Mi Coleccion. (2012). Fonovisa.
- 20 Kilates. (2014) Fonovisa/Univision Records
- Gran Encuentro (20 Éxitos Originales)/(con Los Ángeles Azules).(2014) UMG Records/Universal Music Distribution. (Only Available On USA).
- Amor De Telenovela (Baile Total). (2017) UMG Records/Universal Music Distribution. (Only available on Digital Download)
- Lo Mas Escuchado De.. (2019) UMG Records/Universal Music Distribution. (Only available on Digital Download)
- Lo Mas Romantico De.. (2021) UMG Records/Universal Music Distribution. (Only available on Digital Download)
- Cumbias De Verano Best Hits. (2021) UMG Records/Universal Music Distribution. (Only available on Digital Download)
- Ayer, Hoy y Siempre. (2021) UMG Records/Universal Music Distribution. (Only available on Digital Download)
- Cumbias Para Bailar. (2021) UMG Records/Universal Music Distribution. (Only available on Digital Download)
- Favoritas Con Amor. (2022) UMG Records/Universal Music Distribution. (Only available on Digital Download)

== Official Video Clips ==
- Me Vas A Recordar (1999)
- Amor Secreto (1999)
- Mentiras (1999)
- Un sueño (2000)
- Toda (2000)
- Me Volvi A Acordar De Ti (2001)
- Que levante la mano (2001)
- Por Un Minuto De Tu Amor (2002)
- !Y Qué! (2003)
- Cuando te enamoras (Univision music group (2005)
- Ya me enteré (2020) Gerencia 360
