= Te Voy a Enamorar =

Studio album by Los Ángeles de Charly
- Released: November 6, 2001
- Genre: Balada, Cumbia
- Label: Fonovisa

Los Ángeles de Charly chronology
Un Sueño (2001)	Te Voy a Enamorar (2001)	Juntos Por Primera Vez (2002)

Professional ratings
Review scores
Source	Rating
Allmusic	3/5 stars

Te Voy a Enamorar (Eng.: I'm Going to Make You Love Me') is a studio album released by romantic music ensemble Los Ángeles de Charly. The album became their first number-one hit on the Billboard Top Latin Albums chart.

== Track listing ==
This information from Billboard.com

1. Me Volví a Acordar de Ti (Alejandro Vezzani) — 3:59
2. La Princesita Sueña (Anibal Pastor) — 4:06
3. Te Voy a Enamorar (Alejandro Vezzani) — 3:42
4. Quinceañera (Daniel Avila) — 3:49
5. El Primer Beso de Amor (Anibal Pastor) — 3:51
6. Que Levante la Mano (Alejandro Vezzani) — 3:53
7. Está Muy Sola la Niña (Gustavo Avigliano) — 4:25
8. El Último Beso (Daniel Avila) — 3:52
9. Mi Llamada (Alejandro Vezzani) — 3:15
10. Ven a Mí (William Watson) — 3:57

== Personnel ==
This information from Allmusic.

- Trombone - Alejandro Lopez
- Composer - Alejandro Vezzani
- Composer - Anibal Pastor
- Accordion - Charly Becies
- Composer - Daniel Avila
- Executive Producer - Federico Ehrlich
- Guiro - Fernando Becies
- Engineer, Mixing Engineer - Fernando Roldan
- Timbaleiro, Timbales - Francisco Bruguera Munoz
- Composer - Gustavo Avigliano
- Executive Producer - Ignacio Rodriguez
- Accordion - Jonathan Martinez
- Piano - Jose Luis Martinez
- Primary Artist - Los Angeles De Charly
- Bajo Sexto - Marco Olan
- Accordion - Memo Palafox
- Bajo Sexto - Ricardo Rodriguez
- Photography - Ricardo Trabulsi
- Congas - Ruben Amador
- Assistant - Rudy Durand
- Graphic Design - Varela Diseno
- Percussion - William Valdez
- Accordion, Arranger, Composer, Musical Direction - William Watson

== Chart performance ==
Chart (2001)	Peak position
US Billboard Top Latin Albums	1
US Billboard Regional/Mexican Albums	1
US Billboard Top Independent Albums	17
US Billboard Top Heatseekers	19
