= Grupo Bryndis =

Mexican grupero band

- Current members of Grupo Bryndis

Background information
- Also known as: El Grupo Que Le Canta Al Amor
- Origin: Cerritos, San Luis Potosí, Mexico
- Genre: Grupero
- Years active: 1985 - present
- Labels: Sigala (1985–1988); Fonodiaz (1989–1991); Disa (1992–2008); Capitol Latin (U.S. only); EMI-Televisa (2008–2012); Fonovisa (2012–2018); DDMW (2019–2021) Azteca Records (2021-present)
- Members: Mauro Posadas Sr. (1985-Present); Mauro Posadas Jr. (2010-Present); Gerardo Izaguirre (1989-Present); Claudio Montano (1990-Present); Andy Zúñiga (2012-Present)
- Past members: Guadalupe Guevara (1989-2010); Juan Guevara (1989-2010); Freddy Solís (2010-2012); Tony Solís (1985-1988, 2010-2012); Martín Tobías

Grupo Bryndis is a Mexican grupero band from Cerritos, San Luis Potosí. The band won a Latin Grammy Award in 2007. The band performs ballads, cumbias, rancheras, and huapangos.

== Members ==
The current Grupo Bryndis band members are: Mauro Posadas Gallardo (songwriter-leader and electric guitar); Gerardo Izaguirre (songwriter and bass guitar); Claudio Pablo Montaño (songwriter and electronic keyboards); Mauro Posadas Gallardo Jr. (drums); Andy Zuñiga (Electronic percussions, songwriter and lead vocalist).

In March 2010, brothers Guadalupe Guevara (lead vocalist and songwriter) and Juan Guevara (drummer and songwriter) left the group due to disagreements with the other band members. In April 2010, the band welcomed back their original lead vocalist Tony Solís. The band also welcomed Mauro Posadas Jr. on drums. In February 2012, the band welcomed Andy Zuñiga on electronic percussions and backing vocals. Tony Solís and Freddy Solís left the group around the end of 2012. Since late 2013, Zuñiga has been the lead vocalist for the group.

== Discography ==
=== Albums ===
- Alma Vacía (1986 - first album on Sígala Records with Tony Solís)
- Atrás de Mí Ventana (1987)
- Hola (1988 - last album on Sígala Records)
- Loco De Amor Con Banda (1989 - first album on Fonodiaz and last album with Tony Solís before returning 21 years later)
- Me Vas a Extrañar (1989 - first album on Fonodiaz with Guadalupe Guevara, Juan Guevara and Gerardo Izaguirre)
- Me Haces Falta (1990 - first album with Claudio Pablo)
- Aún Te Amo (1991 - last album on Fonodiaz)
- 15 Hits Romance Sin Límite (1992 - First album on Disa. This album included 15 of their previous hits released under Fonodiaz, but this time, they were rerecorded)
- A Su Salud (1992 - the album was alternatively titled "Te Esperaré" in some later reissues)
- Por El Amor (1993 - received gold status in 1994)
- Tu Amor Secreto (1995)
- Mi Verdadero Amor (1996 - received the Disa Cristal certification along with a Disa Cristal reissue that same year)
- Así es el Amor (1997)
- Un Juego de Amor (1998)
- Por el Pasado (2000)
- En el Idioma del Amor (2001)
- Nuestros Éxitos con Trío (2002)
- Memorias (2003)
- El Quinto Trago (2004)
- Por Muchas Razones Te Quiero (2005 - this album included rerecorded songs from their early albums)
- Recordandote (2006)
- Solo Pienso En Ti (2007 - last Álbum on Disa - Latin Grammy Award winner)
- La Magía de Tu Amor (2008 - first Álbum on EMI/Capitol Latin and last album with Guadalupe Guevara and Juan Guevara)
- Más Allá del Tiempo y La Distancia (2010 - first album with the return of original lead vocalist Tony Solís)
- Huele a Peligro (2011 - last album on EMI/Capitol Latin and with Tony Solís and Freddy Solís)
- Adicto a Ti (2014 - first album on Fonovisa and with Andy Zuñiga as lead vocalist)
- A Nuestro Estilo (2016)

=== Live Albums ===
- Nuestros Éxitos Con Trío (2003)
- En Vivo Gira México 2005 (2005)
- Acustico (2006)
- 30 Años Cantándole al Amor (2018 - last album on Fonovisa)
- La Historia de los Éxitos (2021)

=== Compilations ===
- Poemas, Vol. 1 (1994)
- Poemas, Vol. 2 (1996)
- 14 Super Cumbias (2000)
- Frente A Frente: Los Dos Grandes Románticos (2001 - face-to-face compilation with Los Acosta)
- Hablando De Amor... Poemas (2002)
- 40 Artistas y Sus Super Éxitos (2003)
- 30 De Colección (2003)
- Encuentro Romántico (2003 - face-to-face compilation with Liberación)
- Mano A Mano (2003 - face-to-face compilation with Los Mismos)
- 30 Más De Colección (2004)
- 30 De Colección: Videos (2004 - DVD compilation)
- La Mejor Colección, Vol. 1 (2005)
- Lo + Ranchero De... (2005 - face-to-face ranchera compilation with Samuray)
- Grandes Éxitos Remezclados y Remasterizados (2005)
- Top Ten (2005)
- Éxitos De Amor (2005 - face-to-face compilation with Liberación)
- La Mejor Colección: Grupera, Vol. 1 (2005 - greatest hits compilation with Viento y Sol & Ladrón)
- Dos Románticos (2006 - face-to-face compilation with Los Temerarios)
- Cumbias Románticas (2006 - face-to-face compilation with Los Temerarios)
- 20 Reales Super Éxitos (2006)
- Más Que Románticos (2006)
- La Mejor Colección, Vol. 2 (2006)
- Los Super Éxitos Con Mariachi (2006)
- Las Super Baladas (2006)
- Los Super Éxitos en DVD (2006)
- Los Super Éxitos (2006)
- Historia Video Musical (2006)
- 3 Grandes Cantan Al Amor (2007 - a 2-CD greatest hits compilation with Los Yonic's & Los Temerarios)
- 15 Auténticos Éxitos (2007)
- 15 Éxitos de Colección (2007 - compilation released under Venevisión, under exclusive license to Universal Music Latino)
- 15 Inolvidables de Siempre (2007)
- 15 Grandes: El Inicio de una Historia (2007)
- Dos Grandes (2007 - face-to-face compilation with Bronco)
- Línea de Oro: Vas a Sufrir y Muchos Éxitos Más (2007)
- Línea de Oro, Vol. 2: Quizás Sí, Quizás No y Muchos Éxitos Más (2007)
- Línea de Oro en DVD (2007)
- Línea de Oro en DVD, Vol. 2 (2007)
- Época Dorada (2008)
- La Historia (2008)
- Las Inmortales De... (2008 - greatest hits compilation with Los Bybys & Los Terrícolas)
- Dos Grandes (2008 - Disa released two versions of the Dos Grandes compilation with Grupo Bryndis. One with Los Acosta and one with Liberación)
- El Grupo Que Le Canta Al Amor (2008 - compilation released before the Guevara brothers left the band)
- 20 Poemas, Canciones y Romances (2009)
- Colección Privada: Las 20 Exclusivas (2009)
- Éxitos de Siempre (2009)
- La Más Completa Colección (2009)
- La Década Musical: 20 Pegaditas (2009)
- Serie Diamante: 30 Super Éxitos (2009)
- Frente a Frente (2009 - face-to-face compilation with Liberación)
- Tercia Romántica Con Mariachi (2009 - a 15-track compilation which includes Mariachi versions of songs which were in the Los Super Exitos Con Mariachi compilations)
- Serie 33 (2009)
- 15 Éxitos (2010)
- Un Bryndis Con Los Acosta (2010 - Released after the departure of the Guevara brothers, with Los Acosta's vocalist having vocals on 9 of the 10 songs in the compilation)
- Íconos: 25 Éxitos (2012)
- 20 Aniversario (2012)
- 20 Kilates (2013)
- Romances (2013)
- Imprescindibles (2014)
- La Historia De Los Éxitos (20 Super Temas) (2014)
- Gran Encuentro (20 Éxitos Originales) (2014 - Disa released two versions of the Gran Encuentro compilation with Grupo Bryndis. One with Los Acosta and one with Liberación)
- 20 Kilates Románticos (2015)
- 45 Éxitos: Versiones Originales (2015)
- Solo Hits: 20 Éxitos (2016)
- 2En1 (2017 - double-compilation with the albums Solo Pienso En Ti and Por Muchas Razones Te Quiero)
- Lo Más Romántico De... (2019)
- Ayer, Hoy y Siempre Con... Grupo Bryndis (2020)
- Frente A Frente (2021 - face-to-face compilation with Los Acosta)
- Lo Más Romántico De... (2021)
- Cumbias Para Bailar (2021)
- FAVORITAS CON AMOR (2022)
- Las Retro Chingonas (2022)
- FAVORITAS CON AMOE, VOl. 2 (2023)
- Desamor y Despecho (2023)
- THE BEST OF (2023)
- Lo Mejor De Dos Grandes (2023 - face-to-face compilation with Los Acosta)
- Un Brindis de Amor (2023)
- Duelo Romántico (2024 - face-to-face compilation with Los Rehenes)
- Rosas y Bombones con Grupo Bryndis (2025)
- La Voz de México (2025)
- Entre Besos y Heridas (2026)

=== Appearances ===
- 100% Puro San Luis (2005)

=== Selected singles ===
Charting singles include

- "Te Vas Con Él"
- "La Última Canción"
- "Otro Ocupa Mi Lugar"
- "El Quinto Trago"
- "Atrás de Mi Ventana"
- "Te Esperaré"
- "Quizás Sí Quizás No"
- "Perdóname"
- "Entre Tú y Yo"
- "Secreto Amor"
- "Vas A Sufrir"
- "La Chica del Este"
