= List of Billboard Regional Mexican Albums number ones of 2008 =

The Regional Mexican Albums, published in Billboard magazine, is a record chart that features Latin music sales information for regional styles of Mexican music. This data are compiled by Nielsen SoundScan from a sample that includes music stores, music departments at department stores and verifiable sales from concert venues in the United States.

== Albums ==
Issue date	Album	Artist(s)	Reference(s)
January 5	Capaz de Todo Por Ti	K-Paz De La Sierra	
January 12	Capaz de Todo Por Ti	K-Paz De La Sierra	
January 19	Capaz de Todo Por Ti	K-Paz De La Sierra	
January 26	Capaz de Todo Por Ti	K-Paz De La Sierra	
February 2	Capaz de Todo Por Ti	K-Paz De La Sierra	
February 9	Capaz de Todo Por Ti	K-Paz De La Sierra	
February 16	Capaz de Todo Por Ti	K-Paz De La Sierra	
February 23	Que Ganas de Volver	Conjunto Primavera	
March 1	Que Ganas de Volver	Conjunto Primavera	
March 8	En Vivo: Desde El Auditorio Nacional 09/07	K-Paz De La Sierra	
March 15	En Vivo: Desde El Auditorio Nacional 09/07	K-Paz De La Sierra	
March 22	Raíces	Los Tigres del Norte	
March 29	Raíces	Los Tigres del Norte	
April 5	Raíces	Los Tigres del Norte	
April 12	Insatisfecha	Diana Reyes	
April 19	Los Gabriel...Cantan A Mexico	Juan Gabriel & Ana Gabriel	
April 26	Para Siempre	Vicente Fernández	
May 3	Para Siempre	Vicente Fernández	
May 10	Para Siempre	Vicente Fernández	
May 17	Para Siempre	Vicente Fernández	
May 24	Para Siempre	Vicente Fernández	
May 31	Para Siempre	Vicente Fernández	
June 7	Para Siempre	Vicente Fernández	
June 14	Para Siempre	Vicente Fernández	
June 21	Para Siempre	Vicente Fernández	
June 28	Para Siempre	Vicente Fernández	
July 5	Una Noche En Madrid: Marco Antonio Solis En Vivo	Marco Antonio Solís	
July 12	Una Noche En Madrid: Marco Antonio Solis En Vivo	Marco Antonio Solís	
July 19	Una Noche En Madrid: Marco Antonio Solis En Vivo	Marco Antonio Solís	
July 26	Si Tú Te Vas	Los Temerarios	
August 2	Si Tú Te Vas	Los Temerarios	
August 9	Si Tú Te Vas	Los Temerarios	
August 16	Si Tú Te Vas	Los Temerarios	
August 23	Si Tú Te Vas	Los Temerarios	
August 30	Si Tú Te Vas	Los Temerarios	
September 6	Para Siempre †	Vicente Fernández	
September 13	Tu Inspiración	Alacranes Musical	
September 20	Tu Inspiración	Alacranes Musical	
September 27	Jenni	Jenni Rivera	
October 4	Jenni	Jenni Rivera	
October 11	Vámonos Pa'l Río	Los Pikadientes de Caborca	
October 18	Vámonos Pa'l Río	Los Pikadientes de Caborca	
October 25	No Molestar	Marco Antonio Solis	
November 2	No Molestar	Marco Antonio Solis	
November 9	No Molestar	Marco Antonio Solis	
November 16	No Molestar	Marco Antonio Solis	
November 23	No Molestar	Marco Antonio Solis	
November 30	No Molestar	Marco Antonio Solis	
December 6	No Molestar	Marco Antonio Solis	
December 13	No Molestar	Marco Antonio Solis	
December 20	Primera Fila	Vicente Fernández	
December 27	Primera Fila	Vicente Fernández	
