= En Vivo: Desde el Auditorio Nacional =

Live album by K-Paz de la Sierra
- Released: February 19, 2008
- Recorded: September 8, 2007
- Genre: Duranguense
- Label: Disa

K-Paz de la Sierra chronology
Capaz de Todo Por Tí (2007)	En Vivo: Desde el Auditorio Nacional (2008)	Como Un Tatuaje (2009)

En Vivo: Desde el Auditorio Nacional (Eng.: Live: From the Mexican Auditorium) is a live album by Mexican duranguense band K-Paz de la Sierra. It was released on February 19, 2008. This album became their third number-one set on the Billboard Top Latin Albums.

== Track listing CD/DVD ==
The information from Billboard.

No.	Title	Writer(s)	Length
1.	"Presentación"		2:01
2.	"Procuro Olvidarte"	Manuel Alejandro, Ana Magdalena	5:30
3.	"Mi Vecinita"	Federico Caballero Chávez	3:19
4.	"Mi Credo"	Enrique Guzmán Yáñez	4:04
5.	"¡Oh! Carol"	Neil Sedaka, Howard Greenfield	4:12
6.	"Amor Mío"	Sergio Gómez	3:44
7.	"Silueta de Cristal"	María de Lisa Correa, Alfredo Correa Julion, Ricardo Banjay	4:35
8.	"Jambalaya"	Hank Williams	2:38
9.	"Muñeca de Ojos de Miel"	Henry Posada Torres	3:20
10.	"El Pasadiscos"	Gerardo Aieta, José Larroco, Diego Verdaguer	4:02
11.	"Volveré"	Claudio Datilli, Carbonelli Polizzy, Marcello Ramoino	8:35
12.	"Pero Te Vas a Arrepentir"	Marco Antonio Solís	3:12
13.	"San Juan del Río"	Benjamin Sánchez Mota	3:07
14.	"Y Aquí Estoy"	Ana Gabriel	4:44
15.	"Querido Amigo"	Luis Díaz, Humberto Durán	3:54

== Chart performance ==
Chart (2008)	Peak position
Mexico AMPROFON Albums Chart	21
US Billboard Top Latin Albums	1
US Billboard Regional Mexican Albums	1
US Billboard 200	80
