= MWE =

MWE may refer to:

- Manufacturer's Weight Empty
- McDermott Will & Emery, international law firm
- Merowe Airport, Sudan - IATA code
- Midwest Express, now Midwest Airlines
- Minimal working example, in computer science
- Multiword expression

MWe may refer to:

- Megawatt electrical
