= Mwe =

Mwe or m.w.e. may refer to:

- Meter water equivalent, a unit of nuclear and particle physics
- MWe ("megawatt electrical"), a unit of electric power used in the electric power industry
- Mwe (town), a settlement in Kenya's Eastern Province
- Minimal working example, in debugging code
- Multiword expression
- 6 MWE = "Six Million Weren't Enough", an anti-semitic slogan associated with the Proud Boys
