= Live – En Vivo Desde Mexico =

Live - En Vivo Desde Mexico

Live album by Alacranes Musical
- Released: February 17, 2009
- Genre: Duranguense
- Length: 49:22
- Label: Univision Music

Alacranes Musical chronology
Tu Inspiración (2008)	Live - En Vivo Desde Mexico (2009)

Live – En Vivo Desde Mexico is a live album by Alacranes Musical. It was released on February 17, 2009.

== Track listing ==
1. Intro
2. Solo En Ti
3. Vete Ya
4. Al Ritmo De La Lluvia
5. A Cambio De Que
6. La Hummer Del Año
7. Por Tu Amor
8. Si Te Vuelves A Enamorar
9. Un Idiota
10. El Teniente
11. Quebradita En El Mar
12. Por Amarte Así
13. Agustin Jaime
