= MRE (disambiguation) =

MRE, or Meal, Ready-to-Eat, is a U.S. military individual field ration.

MRE or mre may also refer to:

== Government and politics ==
- European Republicans Movement (Movimento Repubblicani Europei), a social-liberal political party in Italy
- Ministry of Foreign Affairs (Brazil) (Ministério das Relações Exteriores), the governmental body that conducts Brazil's foreign relations with other countries
- Maritime Republic of Eastport, a micronation in Maryland

== Science and technology ==
- Magnetic resonance elastography, a non-invasive medical imaging technique
- Magnetorheological elastomer, a class of solids that consist of a polymeric matrix with embedded micro- or nano-sized ferromagnetic particles
- Minimal reproducible example, a software debugging technique
- Managed runtime environment, a type of virtual machine that runs as a normal application inside a host OS and supports one process

== Other uses ==
- Master of Religious Education, a terminal academic degree in preparation for professional teaching ministry
- Martha's Vineyard Sign Language, an ISO 639-3 code
