= List of number-one Billboard Regional Mexican Songs of 2006 =

The Billboard Regional Mexican Songs chart ranks the best-performing Regional Mexican singles in the United States. Published weekly by Billboard magazine, it ranks the "most popular regional Mexican songs, ranked by radio airplay audience impressions as measured by Nielsen Music."

== Chart history ==
The yellow background indicates the best-performing song of 2006.

Issue date	Song	Artist(s)	Ref.
January 7	"No puedo olvidarte"	Beto y sus Canarios	
January 14	"No puedo olvidarte"	Beto y sus Canarios	
January 21	"No puedo olvidarte"	Beto y sus Canarios	
January 28	"Pero te vas a arrepentir"	K-Paz de la Sierra & José Manuel Zamacona	
February 4	"Contra viento y marea"	Intocable	
February 11	"Contra viento y marea"	Intocable	
February 18	"Contra viento y marea"	Intocable	
February 25	"Algo de mí"	Conjunto Primavera	
March 4	"Algo de mí"	Conjunto Primavera	
March 11	"Algo de mí"	Conjunto Primavera	
March 18	"Algo de mí"	Conjunto Primavera	
March 25	"Algo de mí"	Conjunto Primavera	
April 1	"Algo de mí"	Conjunto Primavera	
April 8	"Algo de mí"	Conjunto Primavera	
April 15	"Algo de mí"	Conjunto Primavera	
April 22	"Señor locutor"	Los Tigres del Norte	
April 29	"Algo de mí"	Conjunto Primavera	
May 6	"Señor locutor"	Los Tigres del Norte	
May 13	"Aliado del tiempo"	Mariano Barba	
May 20	"Algo de mí"	Conjunto Primavera	
May 27	"Aliado del tiempo"	Mariano Barba	
June 3	"De contrabando"	Jenni Rivera	
June 10	"Aliado del tiempo"	Mariano Barba	
June 17	"Aliado del tiempo"	Mariano Barba	
June 24	"Aliado del tiempo"	Mariano Barba	
July 1	"Aliado del tiempo"	Mariano Barba	
July 8	"Más allá del sol"	Joan Sebastian	
July 15	"Más allá del sol"	Joan Sebastian	
July 22	"Más allá del sol"	Joan Sebastian	
July 29	"Más allá del sol"	Joan Sebastian	
August 5	"Díganle"	Conjunto Primavera	
August 12	"Más allá del sol"	Joan Sebastian	
August 19	"Más allá del sol"	Joan Sebastian	
August 26	"Más allá del sol"	Joan Sebastian	
September 2	"Te compro"	Duelo	
September 9	"Más allá del sol"	Joan Sebastian	
September 16	"Más allá del sol"	Joan Sebastian	
September 23	"De rodillas te pido"	Los Alegres de la Sierra	
September 30	"De rodillas te pido"	Los Alegres de la Sierra	
October 7	"De rodillas te pido"	Los Alegres de la Sierra	
October 14	"De rodillas te pido"	Los Alegres de la Sierra	
October 21	"De rodillas te pido"	Los Alegres de la Sierra	
October 28	"Que vuelva"	Grupo Montez de Durango	
November 4	"Más allá del sol"	Joan Sebastian	
November 11	"De rodillas te pido"	Los Alegres de la Sierra	
November 18	"De rodillas te pido"	Los Alegres de la Sierra	
November 25	"De rodillas te pido"	Los Alegres de la Sierra	
December 2	"De rodillas te pido"	Los Alegres de la Sierra	
December 9	"De rodillas te pido"	Los Alegres de la Sierra	
December 16	"Dime quién es"	Los Rieleros del Norte	
December 23	"Dime quién es"	Los Rieleros del Norte	
December 30	"Dime quién es"	Los Rieleros del Norte	
