= Ahora y Siempre (Alacranes Musical album) =

Studio album by Alacranes Musical
- Released: May 22, 2007
- Recorded: 2006–2007
- Genre: Norteño, ranchero, Duranguense
- Length: 35:43
- Label: Univision Music

Alacranes Musical chronology
Pura Dinamita Duranguense (2007)	Ahora y Siempre (2007)	Urbanos Unidos← (2008)

Ahora y Siempre (Eng.: Now and Forever) is a studio album released by music group Alacranes Musical. This album became their first number-one set on the Billboard Top Latin Albums, and was released in a standard CD presentation and as a Deluxe Edition CD/DVD combo.

== Track listing ==
The track listing from Billboard and Allmusic.

=== CD ===
No.	Title	Writer(s)	Length
1.	"Por Amarte Así"	Eduardo Reyes, Alejandro Montalban	2:57
2.	"Sólo En Tí"	Vince Clarke	2:55
3.	"Quiero Aprender"	Omar Sánchez	2:50
4.	"El Cabrito"	José de Jesús Soto	3:26
5.	"Tatuajes"	Joan Sebastian	2:48
6.	"Vete Ya"	Raúl Enrique Mora	2:34
7.	"Por Tu Amor"	José Lugardo Del Toro, Eduardo Urbina	3:19
8.	"Cielito Duranguense"	Oscar Urbina Jr.	2:44
9.	"Amame Hasta Con Los Dientes"	Memo Méndez Guiu	2:53
10.	"Lo Que Son Las Cosas"	Luis Angel Márquez	2:59
11.	"Sigo Pensando en Tí"	Eduardo Urbina	3:09
12.	"Sin Tu Amor"	Del Toro	3:09

=== Deluxe edition ===
On February 12, 2008 a Deluxe edition of this album was released, including the same track listing and a bonus DVD with 4 music videos.

No.	Title	Writer(s)	Length
1.	"Sin Tu Amor"	Del Toro, Sánchez	2:57
2.	"Por Amarte Así"	Montalban, Reyes	2:57
3.	"Vete Ya"	Mora	2:34
4.	"Sin Tu Amor"	Del Toro, Sánchez	3:09

== Chart performance ==
=== Weekly charts ===
Weekly chart performance for Ahora y Siempre
Chart (2007)	Peak position
Mexican Albums (AMPROFON)	76
US Billboard 200	47
US Regional Mexican Albums (Billboard)	1
US Top Latin Albums (Billboard)	1

=== Year-end charts ===
2007 year-end chart performance for Ahora y Siempre
Chart (2007)	Position
US Regional Mexican Albums (Billboard)	6
US Top Latin Albums (Billboard)	25

== Sales and certifications ==
Region	Certification	Certified units/sales
United States (RIAA)	2× Platinum (Latin)	200,000^{^}
^{^} Shipments figures based on certification alone.
