= Korg 01/W =

Workstation synthesizer

01/W
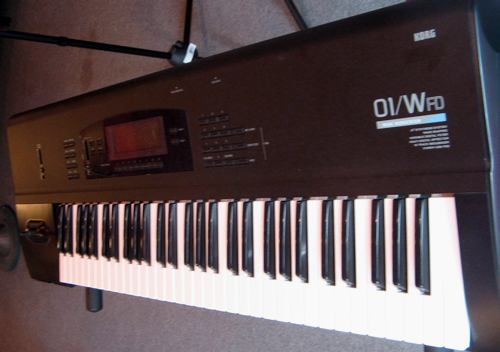
- An image of a Korg 01/Wfd
- Manufacturer: Korg
- Dates: 1991

Technical specifications
- Polyphony: 32
- Oscillator: 32 Total
- Synthesis type: Digital Sample-based Subtractive
- Effects: 2x47

Input/output
- Keyboard: 61-key Aftertouch, Velocity
- Left-hand control: Joystick
- External control: MIDI

Korg 01/W is series of workstation synthesizers manufactured by Korg. The first debuted in 1991, and were intended to replace the M1 and T series. The workstation/ROMpler was based on AI² (Advanced Integrated Squared), an improved version of the AI (Advanced Integrated) Synthesis technology found in the M1 (although the advancements of the core synthesis engine were arguably quite minor, except for the subsequently removed Waveshaping, see below). The success of the AI² architecture ensured it was used in the majority of subsequent Korg synths of the 1990s.

== Variations ==
- 01/W: The basic 61-key model, without a floppy disk drive. Its sequencer holds 7,000 notes and keeps its data in battery-backed memory when the power is off.
- 01/Wfd: Same as above, but with a 3.5" double-density floppy disk drive and a 48,000-note sequencer, whose contents are lost when the power is switched off.
- 01/Wpro: A 76-key version with 10MB of sample ROM, which adds a second multisampled acoustic piano and ten more drum and percussion sounds. It can also load and save Standard MIDI Files.
- 01/WproX: The 88-key version of the 01/Wpro, with the same wooden weighted keyboard as the Korg T1.
- 01R/W: A rackmount version of the 01/W.
- 03R/W: A stripped-down version of the 01R/W rack, 1U in height, with a backlit 16-character by 2-line display. It has no sequencer and no Waveshaping, only 5MB of sample ROM (vs. 6MB in the 01/W models), and one fewer bank each of Programs and Combinations. It was the first Korg instrument with General MIDI compatibility.

There was also the subsequent Korg 05R/W half size 1U rack unit released in 1993. In spite of its name it was actually based on the Korg X3 and essentially served as a prelude to the X3's successor, the original Korg X5 keyboard that was released the following year. It was GM compliant and, while it didn't include a sequencer and had only half as many patches, it did include a serial interface for Mac/PC.

== Improvements over the M1 & T-series ==
- 255 multisounds and 119 drum sounds in 6MB of sample ROM.
- Polyphony doubled from 16 to 32 notes, sequencer tracks doubled from eight to 16, and maximum sequencer resolution doubled from 48 to 96ppqn, with a dedicated tempo track.
- The sequencer of the 01/Wfd, 01/Wpro and 01/WproX holds 48,000 notes, against 50,000 on the T-series.
- Effects processing taken from the Korg Wavestation: 47 effects and effect combinations vs. 33 on the M1 and T-series, assignable to each of the two effects processors, plus an extra parallel routing taken from Korg's S3 drum machine.
- Dynamic modulation of selected effect parameters, usually the dry/wet balance, for the first time on an M1/T-series instrument.
- Waveshaping, the most significant addition to the synthesis engine. Each oscillator in a Program can be routed through its own Waveshaper, which uses one of 60 waveshapes and a simple Start Level, Decay Time and Sustain Level envelope to add harmonics, often non-integer ones, that are not in the source sample.
- Smaller synthesis additions, such as a random waveform for the pitch modulation generator and independent panning for each oscillator.
- 200 Programs and 200 Combinations onboard vs. 100/100 in the M1 and 200/100 in the T-series, plus a further 200 of each on an SRC512 RAM card.
- A backlit 64 x 240-dot LCD, like the T-series, in place of the M1's 2-line, 40-character display.
- New PCM ROM cards holding 1M words of sample data, sold in XSC sets with Program/Combination cards. The 01/W cannot read M- or T-series sample cards or Program/Combination data.
- 01/Wpro and 01/WproX have an extra 4MB of sample ROM, mostly for a second acoustic piano multisample (for a total of 10MB).

== Key Differences to Earlier Korg M-/T-Series and Later "AI2" Models ==
The 01/W only had a few of the M1's samples although the optional XSC-801 PCM data card, which was part of the XSC-1S Best Of M&T set, provided 36 more samples from the M and T series. Particularly missing were the M1 Acoustic Piano, and some of the M1 Electric Piano sounds. These were replaced by more realistic versions (the Acoustic Piano in the 01/W was radically different and sounded more oriented for classical music). The 01/Wpro even went a step further and added another even more realistic Acoustic Piano.

The M1's piano was so bright and metallic sounding that it found its niche in Dance/Electronica and some Latin Music where it could cut through the mix easily. Korg acknowledged this fact by integrating their M1 piano back on later incarnations of the X range, such as in the X5D synth and N264/364 workstations.

The 01/W also added more electric piano sounds, having at least 5 times as many, therefore becoming one of the standard keyboards used in smooth jazz, which often uses electric piano sounds.

The 01/W introduced a feature called "Waveshaping". This was a feature where each sample value was run through a non-linear function, and thereby producing new harmonics. This is similar to the way a tube amp distorts sound. It was possible to select from 60 different waveshapes having names like "Rezzy", "Parabola" & "Comb", to transform/distort/harmonically alter the sound. Waveshaping would add different harmonics to the sound depending on the selected waveshape, but the added harmonics depended also heavily on what kind of sample that was fed into the waveshaping function. The waveshaping feature could make some very interesting sonic textures as it would literally reshape the sound to fit that specific waveshape. However, the feature was discontinued on subsequent models. Original sounds were achievable but required significant experimentation, as using waveshaping on stock samples often only seemed to add distortion.

Because Korg removed the discrete custom Waveshaping IC chip and capability from all "AI2" models subsequent to the 01/W-series, and the Waveshaping feature was the most, or arguably only, significant addition to the original "AI" core synthesis engine (i.e. all manipulations and control of the sound post-oscillator-generation until before channel DSP effects are added), it might be said that the 01/W-series comprise the only "true" "AI2" models released by Korg. (AI2 also featured some enhancements to synthesis LFOs and post-processing DSP signal routing and number of algorithms ).

In addition, all Korg "AI2" models subsequent to the 01/W-series used smaller and/or lower resolution and/or non-graphic LCD displays. Further, all 61-key "AI2" keyboards subsequent to the 01/W-series included cost-reduced and lesser-quality (according to many players) keybed (musical keyboard mechanism assembly) compared to the top Yamaha FS model keybed installed by Korg in the 01/W, 01/Wfd, 01/Wpro (76-key), and all of its top workstation and synthesizers from 1988 (M1) until circa 2011 (discontinuation of Oasys-76, debuted 2005) - as well as by Yamaha in its top models.

Although difficult to directly quantify because the absence of technical data released by Korg, many users feel the 01/W-series PCM base-ROM waveforms are "higher quality" than the more numerous PCM base-ROM waveforms included the in subsequent AI2 models (except for the few higher-quality additional largely acoustic/electric-piano ROM waves in final, late-1990s AI2 models).

Also, the 01/W-series featured expandable PCM ROM via new, higher-capacity 2MB external add-in cards unavailable to all subsequent "AI2" models. Further, 01/W-series keyboards (except the briefly-available original non-"fd" 01/W model) featured on-board removable Program/Combination/PCG and sequencer data storage via 3.5" floppy diskettes that most subsequent "AI2" models lacked. Finally, the aluminum and steel chassis construction of the 01/W-series keyboards is heavier-duty (and heavier in weight) than most subsequent "AI2" models.

For these reasons, the 01/W-series may be viewed as the most "deluxe", easy-to-use, and "true" "AI2-synthesis" models produced, despite being the first released. (It was also the most expensive.)

The 01/W-series lacked the earlier, significantly more expensive T-series' 1-megabyte sample RAM (optional on T3, standard on T2 and T1), into which users could load their own multisamples. However, in some compensation, the capacity of 01/W-series PCM ROM expansion cards was increased fourfold to 2MB from the M-/T-series' 512KB PCM ROM cards.

The 01/W-series had the major updated benefit of market-competitive 32-voice/32-oscillator polyphony compared to the relatively substandard 16-voice/16-oscillator polyphony of the M-/T-series (and therefore compared favorably to earlier and contemporary 32-oscillator synthesizers like Roland D50/D20/D10/D5, Kawai K4/K1, Yamaha SY77/SY99, plus various 21-, 24-, and 32-voice/oscillator models from Ensoniq, E-mu, and others).

== Sonic character ==
The 01/W is also known for its "warmth". It has been suggested the 01/W sounded richer than the Korg synths that came afterward. The two most probable reasons for that are:

- The 01/W's samples, like those of the M-/T-series, were recorded at 31.25 kHz. Subsequent Korg top synths beginning with the 1995 Trinity had their samples recorded at 48 kHz. The sample rate of 31.25 kHz limited the frequencies possible in any sample to below 16 kHz, instead of the 22.05 kHz of later synths by Korg.
- More ROM memory and/or bit-depth resolution was allocated to each sample than the synths following afterward. (As an example, the 01/W used 6 MB of ROM to fit 254 samples, while the subsequent Korg X3 also used 6 MB to fit 334 samples in its ROM.).

The fact that the 01/W's samples were recorded at a lower sampling rate compared to Compact Disc CD-DA Redbook standard, thereby reducing sample size, plus the advantage of having more ROM memory than the M1 it replaced, meant that longer samples could be stored, possibly adding more realism to sustained sounds and so forth. The 31.25 kHz frequency might give the illusion of a more acoustic instrument, because it might be perceived as reducing the amount of high frequencies, which tend to be attenuated in physical/analogue instruments when compared to digital ones.

== Options ==
- XSC PCM cards set
- XPC ROM cards
- SRC512 RAM card
- VUK01W ROM OS upgrade kit

== Name origin ==
Reportedly, the 01/W was originally intended to be named the M/10, but the marketing department read the name upside down.

== Notable users ==
- Tony Banks
- Phil Collins
- Jean-Michel Jarre
- Chad Hugo
- Jun Senoue
- Keith Emerson
- Marcos Witt
- Juan Carlos Alvarado
- Alex Staropoli
- Joe Zawinul
- Juana Molina
- Billy Joel
- Greg Phillinganes
- Isaiah Sanders
- Global Communication
- Viju Shah
- William Eggleston
- A R Rahman
