= Tu Inspiración =

Studio album by Alacranes Musical
- Released: August 26, 2008
- Genre: Duranguense
- Length: 36:09
- Label: Univision Music

Alacranes Musical chronology
| Ahora y Siempre (2007) | Tu Inspiración (2008) | Live - En Vivo Desde Mexico (2009) |

Tu Inspiración is the eleventh album by Alacranes Musical. It was released on August 26, 2008.

== Track listing ==
1. Dame Tu Amor
2. Perdidamente Enamorado
3. Fue Su Amor
4. Mirame Amor
5. Soy Yo
6. Mi Otra Mitad
7. Te Sigue Esperando Mi Corazon
8. El Duranguense
9. Esperando Por Ti
10. Adios Amor
11. La Historia De Siempre
12. Esther

== Charts ==
=== Weekly charts ===
| Chart (2008) | Peak position |
|---|---|
| US Billboard 200 | 26 |
| US Top Latin Albums (Billboard) | 2 |
| US Regional Mexican Albums (Billboard) | 1 |

=== Year-end charts ===
| Chart (2008) | Position |
|---|---|
| US Top Latin Albums (Billboard) | 24 |
| Chart (2009) | Position |
| US Top Latin Albums (Billboard) | 66 |

== Sales and certifications ==
| Region | Certification | Certified units/sales |
|---|---|---|
| United States (RIAA) | Platinum (Latin) | 100,000^{^} |
^{^} Shipments figures based on certification alone.
