= Como Un Tatuaje =

Studio album by K-Paz de la Sierra
- Released: June 2, 2009
- Recorded: 2007–2009
- Genre: Duranguense
- Length: 30:44
- Label: Disa

K-Paz de la Sierra chronology
En Vivo: Desde el Auditorio Nacional (2008)	Como Un Tatuaje (2009)

Como Un Tatuaje is a studio album by K-Paz de la Sierra. It was released on June 2, 2009.

== Track listing ==
No.	Title	Length
1.	"Alguién Como Tú"	02:56
2.	"Como Un Tatuaje"	02:58
3.	"No Tiene Nombre"	02:45
4.	"Adoro" (featuring Lupe Esparza of Grupo Bronco)	03:42
5.	"Discúlpame"	03:15
6.	"Quisiera Ser Un Idiota"	02:54
7.	"Te Quedarás Conmigo" (featuring Elsa Ríos)	02:47
8.	"Me Duele Estar Solo"	02:42
9.	"Jamás Te Vayas De Mí"	03:06
10.	"Al Diablo Con Los Guapos aka No Me Supiste Querer" (featuring Allisson Lozz)	03:39
Total length:		30:44
