= Pensando En Ti =

Studio album by K-Paz de la Sierra
- Released: October 19, 2004
- Recorded: 2004
- Genre: Duranguense
- Length: 38:39
- Label: Univision

K-Paz de la Sierra chronology
Arrasando Con Fuego (2003)	Pensando En Ti (2004)	Más Capaces que Nunca (2005)

Singles from Pensando En Ti
- 1. "Volveré" Released: 2004; 2. "La Vecinita" Released: 2004; 3. "Si Tú Te Fueras de Mi" Released: 2005

Professional ratings
Review scores
Source	Rating
Allmusic	3/5 stars

Pensando En Ti is the second studio album by duranguense band K-Paz de la Sierra. It also included a bonus DVD.

== Track listing ==
No.	Title	Length
1.	"Volveré"	03:26
2.	"La Pajarera"	02:54
3.	"Mi Princesa y Tu Rey"	03:36
4.	"La Vecinita"	02:36
5.	"Bailando en el Rancho"	03:28
6.	"Si Tú Te Fueras de Mi"	03:03
7.	"Amor No Me Ignores"	03:15
8.	"Vamos a Bailar"	03:52
9.	"Aullando los Lobos"	03:47
10.	"La Daga"	02:29
11.	"Lucio Vázquez"	02:57
12.	"La Movidita"	03:02
Total length:		38:39

== Chart performance ==
Chart (2004)	Peak position
U.S. The Billboard 200	119
U.S. Top Heatseekers	2
U.S. Top Latin Albums	3

=== Singles ===
Name	Chart (2004)	Peak position
Volvere	U.S. Billboard Hot Latin Tracks	6

== Sales and certifications ==
Region	Certification	Certified units/sales
Mexico (AMPROFON)	Gold	50,000^{^}
United States (RIAA)	Platinum (Latin)	100,000^{^}
^{^} Shipments figures based on certification alone.

== Notes ==
- K-Paz de la Sierra Official MySpace
