= Capaz de Todo Por Ti =

Studio album by K-Paz de la Sierra
- Released: November 20, 2007
- Recorded: 2007
- Genre: Duranguense
- Label: Disa

K-Paz de la Sierra chronology
Conquistando Corazones (2006)	Capaz de Todo Por Ti (2007)	En Vivo: Desde el Auditorio Nacional (2008)

Capaz de Todo Por Ti (Eng.: Capable of Anything for You) is the fifth studio album by Mexican duranguense band K-Paz de la Sierra. It was released on November 20, 2007. The album became their second number-one set on the Billboard Top Latin Albums. It is also noted as the band's last album with founder and original lead vocalist Sergio Gómez.

== Track listing ==
The information from Billboard.

No.	Title	Writer(s)	Length
1.	"Un Buen Perdedor (featuring Franco de Vita)"	José Alejandro Salcedo Morales	3:52
2.	"No Sé Vivir"	Edgar Martinez Ramirez	2:58
3.	"Al Diablo Con Los Guapos"	Gómez, Luis Javier Díaz Morales	4:01
4.	"Volveré"	Sergio Fachelli, Anibal Pastor	3:52
5.	"Entrégate"	Juan Carlos Calderón	3:58
6.	"Soy Capaz"	Gómez, Edgar Cortázar, Adrián Pieragostino	3:09
7.	"Tu Ingratitud"	Víctor Gallegos	2:43
8.	"Que Lástima Mi Amor"	Húmberto Velásquez	3:13
9.	"Susanita"	Rafael Pérez-Botija	3:04
10.	"Ese Loco Soy Yo"	José Francisco Garza Durón, José María Lobo	4:05
11.	"En Algún Lugar"	Mikel Erentxun, Diego Vasallo Barruso	3:01

== Chart performance ==
Chart (2007)/(2008)	Peak position
Mexico AMPROFON Albums Chart	20
US Billboard Top Latin Albums	1
US Billboard Regional Mexican Albums	1
US Billboard 200	93
