= Arrasando Con Fuego =

Arrazando Con Fuego

Studio album by K-Paz de la Sierra
- Released: June 24, 2003
- Recorded: 2002–2003
- Genre: Duranguense
- Label: Disa

K-Paz de la Sierra chronology
Arrazando Con Fuego (2003)	Pensando En Ti (2004)

Singles from Arrazando Con Fuego
- 1. "Con Olor A Hierba" Released: 2003; 2. "Jambalaya" Released: 2003; 3. "Imposible Olvidarte" Released: 2003

Arrasando Con Fuego is the debut studio album by the duranguense band K-Paz de la Sierra. It was released in 2003 on Disa.

== Track listing ==
1. "Con Olor A Hierba"
2. "Jambalaya"
3. "Imposible Olvidarte"
4. "Anillo Grabado"
5. "El Domingo Se Casa"
6. "La Lupe"
7. "Los Ojos de Pancha"
8. "Las Tres Tumbas"
9. "Ayer Bajé de la Sierra"
10. "Rafita Polka"

== Charts ==
Chart (2004)	Peak position
US Top Latin Albums (Billboard)	40
