= Almas Gemelas =

Studio album by El Trono de México
- Released: 8 November 2008
- Genre: Duranguense
- Length: 38:21
- Language: Spanish
- Label: Fonovisa
- Producer: Arturo Torres

El Trono de México chronology
| Cruzando Fronteras (2008) | Almas Gemelas (2008) | Mas Fuerte Que Nunca (2009) |

Almas Gemelas (transl. Soulmates) is a studio album by Mexican duranguense band El Trono de México. It was released on 8 November 2008, through Fonovisa Records. It peaked atop the US Regional Mexican Albums chart, and was the chart's best-selling album of 2009.

== Reception ==
Professional ratings
Review scores
| Source | Rating |
|---|---|
| AllMusic | 3.5/5 stars |

In a favorable review by Alex Henderson of AllMusic, they stated that Almas Gemelas is "less essential than Cruzando Fronteras, but it is still a worthwhile addition to the catalog of El Trono de México". The album won the award for Regional Mexican Album of the Year and received a nomination for Top Latin Album of the Year at the 2010 Billboard Latin Music Awards.

== Track listing ==
Almas Gemelas track listing
| No. | Title | Length |
|---|---|---|
| 1. | "Almas Gemelas" | 3:31 |
| 2. | "Cuando No Estás Te Invento" | 3:34 |
| 3. | "Dios Queria Que Tú" | 3:09 |
| 4. | "El Tonto Que Se Fue Ayer" | 3:30 |
| 5. | "Esto No Va Más Allá" | 3:01 |
| 6. | "Déjenme Si Estoy Llorando" | 2:36 |
| 7. | "Daré" | 2:49 |
| 8. | "Ni una Llamada Ni un Detalle" | 3:07 |
| 9. | "Por Amor a Ti" | 2:43 |
| 10. | "Lo Dijó el Corazón" | 3:47 |
| 11. | "Sin Lugar a Dudas" | 2:58 |
| 12. | "Te Ves Fatal" | 3:36 |
| Total length: | | 38:21 |

== Charts ==
=== Weekly charts ===
Weekly chart performance for Almas Gemelas
| Chart (2008–09) | Peak position |
|---|---|
| US Billboard 200 | 200 |
| US Regional Mexican Albums (Billboard) | 1 |
| US Top Latin Albums (Billboard) | 4 |

=== Year-end charts ===
2009 year-end chart performance for Almas Gemelas
| Chart (2009) | Position |
|---|---|
| US Regional Mexican Albums (Billboard) | 1 |
| US Top Latin Albums (Billboard) | 6 |

2010 year-end chart performance for Almas Gemelas
| Chart (2010) | Position |
|---|---|
| US Top Latin Albums (Billboard) | 74 |

== Certifications ==
Certifications for Almas Gemelas
| Region | Certification | Certified units/sales |
|---|---|---|
| United States (RIAA) | Gold (Latin) | 50,000^{^} |
^{^} Shipments figures based on certification alone.
