= Dame Tu Amor (disambiguation) =

"Dame Tu Amor" is a 1986 song by Selena.

Dame Tu Amor may also refer to:

- Dame Tu Amor (EP), a 1989 EP by Alejandra Guzmán
- "Dame Tu Amor", a 1993 song by Luis Miguel from the album Aries
- "Dame Tu Amor", a 2008 song by Alacranes Musical from the album Tu Inspiración
- "Dame Tu Amor", a 2013 song by Larry Hernandez
- "Dame Tu Amor", a 2012 song by Inna featuring Reik
