= El Avión de las Tres =

Studio album by AK-7
- Released: October 2, 2007
- Recorded: 2007
- Genre: Duranguense
- Length: 70:29
- Label: Fonovisa

AK-7 chronology
El Avión de las Tres (2007)	Renaciendo (2008)

Singles from El Avión de las Tres
- 1. "El Avión de las Tres" Released: September 8, 2007; 2. "La Llamada" Released: September 27, 2007; 3. "Claridad (Stella Stai)" Released: March 24, 2008; 4. "Este Corazon Llora" Released: April 22, 2008

El Avión de las Tres is the debut album by the duranguense band AK-7. Their material was recorded in Joel Solis' studio alongside Eusebio "El Chivo" Cortés, both former members of "Los Bukis", a successful Mexican grupero band. Fonovisa had confirmed that the album from AK-7 was already in excess of 60,000 copies sold in the first months.

== Track listing ==
1. Este Corazon Llora
2. Cariñito de Mi Vida
3. Claridad (Stella Stai)
4. La Llamada
5. Pero Me Acuerdo de Ti
6. Los Vergelitos
7. El Avión de las Tres
8. Valentin de La Sierra
9. Mi Abuelito
10. Lo He Decidido
11. Este Corazon Llora [Balada] (Bonus Track)

== Charts ==
Chart (2007)	Peak position
Top Heatseekers	13
Top Latin Albums	23
Regional Mexican	3
