= Vivir Así =

Studio album by Mijares
- Released: August 25, 2009
- Recorded: 2008–2009
- Genre: Latin pop
- Label: Warner Music México
- Producer: Scott Erickson

Mijares chronology
Hablemos de Amor (2008)	Vivir Así (2009)

Vivir Así (English Living Like This) is the 19th studio album by Mexican pop singer Mijares. It was produced by Scott Erickson. The title song ”Vivir Así”, written by Camilo Sesto, was released as single. Mijares had signed with Warner Music México.

== Album content ==
All 13 tracks are cover versions in Spanish of popular songs. It includes duets with pop singers Ricardo Arjona, Daniela Romo, Pandora and Fela.

== Track listing ==
1. Vivir así
2. Mentira
3. Si tú supieras
4. Mujeres (with Arjona)
5. Como te amé
6. Vuelve
7. Hasta que me olvides (with Fela)
8. Quien piensa en ti
9. Para ti yo estoy (with Daniela Romo & Pandora)
10. Puede ser genial
11. Uno dos tres
12. Vivir sin aire
13. You are so beautiful

=== Covered Singers ===
- Vivir así by Camilo Sesto
- Mentira by Valeria Lynch & Hernaldo Zúñiga
- Si tú supieras Alejandro Fernández
- Mujeres by Ricardo Arjona
- Como te amé by Dionne Warwick, Yuri
- Vuelve by Ricky Martin
- Hasta que me olvides by Luis Miguel
- Quien piensa en ti by Gonzalo
- Para ti yo estoy by Dionne Warwick, Gladys Knight, Elton John & Stevie Wonder
- Puede ser genial by Pandora
- Uno dos tres by Brian McKnight
- Vivir sin aire by Maná
- You Are So Beautiful by Joe Cocker

== Sales and certifications ==
Region	Certification	Certified units/sales
Mexico (AMPROFON)	Platinum	60,000^{^}
^{^} Shipments figures based on certification alone.
