= Conquistando Corazones =

Studio album by K-Paz de la Sierra
- Released: November 14, 2006
- Recorded: 2006
- Genre: Duranguense
- Label: Disa

K-Paz de la Sierra chronology
Mas Capaces que Nunca (2005)	Conquistando Corazones (2006)	Capaz de Todo Por Ti (2007)

Singles from Conquistando Corazones
- 1. "Procuro Olvidarte" Released: October 2006; 2. "Y Aquí Estoy" Released: March 2007; 3. "Amor Mio" Released: August 2007

Conquistando Corazones is the fourth studio album by duranguense band K-Paz de la Sierra.

== Track listing ==
1. "Procuro olvidarte"
2. "No te apartes de mí"
3. "La puerta de Alcalá"
4. "Amor mío"
5. "Charola de plata"
6. "Y Aquí Estoy" (featuring Ana Gabriel)
7. "Tu me atrapaste"
8. "San Juan del Río"
9. "Hey!"
10. "Te juro que te amo"
11. "La vida es amor inmenso" (featuring Cruz Martínez y Los Kumbia Kings)

== Charts ==
Chart (2006)	Peak position
U.S. Top Latin Albums	40
U.S. The Billboard 200	136

=== Singles ===
Title	Chart (2007)	Peak position
"Y Aqui Estoy"	U.S. Billboard Hot Latin Songs	31

== Sales and certifications ==
Region	Certification	Certified units/sales
United States (RIAA)	Platinum (Latin)	100,000^{^}
^{^} Shipments figures based on certification alone.
