= Renaciendo =

Studio album by AK-7
- Released: August 26, 2008
- Recorded: 2007–2008
- Genre: Duranguense
- Length: 39:00
- Label: Fonovisa, Universal

AK-7 chronology
El Avión de las Tres (2007)	Renaciendo (2008)

Singles from Renaciendo
- 1. "Dígale" Released: August 5, 2008; 2. "Hotel de Carretera" Released: February 18, 2009

Professional ratings
Review scores
Source	Rating
Allmusic	3.5/5 stars

Renaciendo is the second album by duranguense band AK-7. The first Single of the album was "Dígale", which was released on August 5, 2008.

Many of the songs combine duranguense's rhythmic bounce with the type of smooth, polished Latin pop romanticism associated with Marco Antonio Solís, Joan Sebastian, and Juan Gabriel. Granted, Renaciendo is hardly an album of slow ballad tempos. That romantic outlook also prevails on a likable cover of Spanish pop singer David Bisbal's "Dígale."

== Track listing ==
No.	Title	Length
1.	"Eres Mi Mundo"	2:58
2.	"Regalo de Bodas"	2:31
3.	"Punto Final"	3:41
4.	"Corrido de Juan Armenta"	3:13
5.	"Amarte Así"	3:45
6.	"Si No Es Ahora [AKA Si No Es Ahora, Sera Mañana]"	3:12
7.	"Dígale"	3:54
8.	"El Corrido de La Muerta"	3:24
9.	"Tu Convencela"	3:23
10.	"Hotel de Carretera"	3:14
11.	"Juan Martha [AKA Corrido de Juan Martha]"	2:52
12.	"Por Amarte"	3:32

== Charts ==
Chart (2008)	Peak position
U.S. Top Latin Albums	34

== Credits ==
- Franco Giordani - Mastering, Mixing
- Gerardo Ramírez - Art Direction
- Adriana Rebold - Artistic Director
- Roberto Salas - Engineer
- Joel Solís - Engineer
- Rafael Solís - Art Direction, Vestuario
