= Dígale =

Single by AK-7

from the album Renaciendo
- Released: July 31, 2008
- Genre: Duranguense ranchera
- Length: 3:52
- Label: Fonovisa, Univision
- Songwriters: Christian Leuzzi, G. Santander
- Producer: AK-7

AK-7 singles chronology
"La Llamada" (2007)	"Dígale" (2008)	"Hotel de Carretera" (2009)

"Dígale" (Tell Him) is the first single from duranguense band AK-7's second album Renaciendo. It is a cover of the song originally by David Bisbal from his album Corazón Latino.
