= K-Paz de la Sierra =

Mexican Duranguense music group

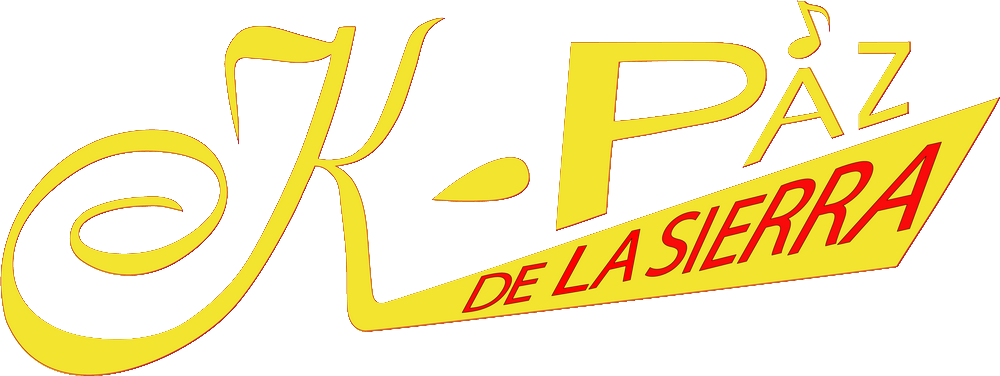

Background information
- Origin: Chicago, Illinois
- Genre: Duranguense
- Years active: 2002-present
- Label: Univision Music Group
- Spinoffs: AK-7; La Autoridad De La Sierra; Majestad De La Sierra
- Members: Luis Guadarrama (2007–present); Jorge El Jagsx Garduño (2008–present); Gabriel Frias (2019–present); Angel Asaf (2021–present); Víctor Cardoso (2019–2022, 2024–present); Jimmy Crisostomo (2024-present); Jesus Morales Conde
- Website: www.kpazdelasierra.co

K-Paz de la Sierra is a regional Mexican band formed in 2002 in Chicago, Illinois. The band specializes in the duranguense genre.

== About ==
The group was formed in late 2002 from the ideas of group members Armando Rodríguez playing tambora (now with band AK-7) and Rafael Solís, former owner and artist. K-Paz de la Sierra became well known in the genre within the United States, Mexico, and throughout South America within the first months of the band's debut. Their popularity grew further in Mexico in comparison to other Duranguense bands. The company Procan (Virgilio Canales - Grupo Liberacion) and Disa Records (Discos Sabinas), were their main labels and promoting company for the band.

== Members ==
Current band members:

- Jesús Morales (lead vocals)
- Luis Guadarama (backing vocals)
- Emmanuel Garibo (backing vocals)
- Ángel Asaf (tambora)
- Victor Cardoso (keyboards)
- Jorge "El Jagsx" Garduño (keyboards)
- Jimmy Crisostomo (keyboards)
- Luis Almeyda (Drums)

=== Former members ===
Former band members include: Sergio Gómez, Sergio Caballero, Miguel Galindo, Oscar Ledezma, Gerardo Ramírez, Luis Díaz, Armando Rodríguez, Carmelo Gamboa, José Luis Corral, Luis García, Alfredo Hernández, Rafael Solís, Jair Loredo, Luis Vidales, Guillermo Rocha, Rafael Ayon, Gabriel Guadarrama, Gabriel Frias y Juan Antonio Guerrero Moreno.

=== Timeline of former members ===
- Sergio Gómez: Leader and lead vocals (2002-2007).
- Óscar Zepeda: Second vocals (2002-2004).
- José Luis Corral: Keyboards (2002-2004).
- Simón Valtierrez: Electric tuba and third vocals (2002-2004).
- Rafael Solís: Keyboards (2002-2006).
- Armando Rodríguez: Tambora (2002-2006).
- Jair Loredo: Drums (2002-2004) and (2006-2013).
- Humberto Durán: 1st and 2nd vocals (2004-2008) and (2021-2024)
- Luis Vidales: Electric tuba (2004-2006).
- Óscar Ledezma: Keyboards (2004-2006).
- Gerardo Ramírez: Musical director and keyboards (2004-2006).
- Carmelo Gamboa: Drums (2004-2006).
- Luis Díaz: Musical director and keyboards (2006-2008).
- Luis García “El Oso de Chicago”: Keyboards (2006-2008).
- Alfredo Hernández: Third vocals (2006-2007).
- Fernando del Vale: Electric tuba (2006-2009) and (2014-2016).
- Miguel Rocha Jr.: Tambora (2006-2008).
- Guillermo Rocha: Electric tuba (?-?).
- Carlos Galaviz: Temporary lead vocals (2006-2008).
- Miguel Galindo: Lead vocals (2008-2011).
- Juan Gómez: Tambora (2008-2011).
- Sergio Caballero: Keyboards director and music producer (2009-2013) and (2016-2017).
- Gabriel Guadarrama: Keyboards and saxophone (2009-2019).
- Juan Guadarrama: Keyboards (2009-2014).
- Julio Hernández: Temporary lead vocals (2011).
- Roberto Guadarrama Jr.: Tambora (2013-2014).
- Yimen Mayares: Drums (2013-2015).
- Martín Velázquez: Keyboards (2014-2019).
- Frank Sánchez: Drums (2015-2020).
- Gabriel Frías: Keyboards (2018-2020).

=== Death of Sergio Gómez ===
On December 2, 2007 Sergio Gómez who was the lead vocalist for the band was murdered after he was kidnapped in the Mexican state of Michoacán. His body was found on December 3 by a highway near the city of Morelia. A report alleges his death was premeditated by a drug-related gang in the city.

== History ==
=== La Autoridad de la Sierra ===
In October 2004, following their second album, Pensando En Ti, four original members: Jair Loredo, Oscar Zepeda, Simon Valtierrez, and Jose Luis Corral, left to form La Autoridad de la Sierra along with Arturo Palomar, Juan Soberanis and Pedro Vargas. Jair Loredo returned to K-Paz in 2007.

=== AK-7 ===
Ending 2006, band members including Gerardo Ramirez, a former keyboardist formed the group AK-7, which stands for "Antes K-Paz" (English: Former K-Paz). This name signaled their connection to K-Paz as former members. The 7 in the name refers to the number of members leaving K-Paz to form the band.

=== Majestad de la Sierra ===
Ending 2008, five members separated and created a new musical group also of the Duranguense genre with the name of Majestad de la Sierra. The third separation originated in a conflict with Juán Gómez brother of the deceased Sergio Gómez and with Beto Duran, because the latter canceled the recording of an album in Monterrey.

On January 29, 2009, K-Paz presented new members under the direction of Juan Gómez (brother of the deceased vocalist) Kompendo de la Sierra:

- Miguel Galindo: Vocals
- Luis Eduardo Guadarrama: Vocals
- Sergio Caballero: Keyboard and Musical Director
- Gabriel Guadarrama: Keyboard
- Fernando del Valle: Electric Tuba
- Juan Gómez: Tambora
- Jorge Garduño: Electric Tuba
- Jair Loredo: Drums

With a new image, a new voice, and a new name, K-Paz de la Sierra, after the success of Como un Tatuaje, managed to get back to popularity. They released their second single on the radio, called "I'd like to be an idiot", which played throughout Mexico and The United States.

The album As a Tattoo, led them to be nominated for the OYE Awards! 2009, as Best Grupo Banda Duranguense, and subsequently to the Premio Lo Nuestro 2010 in the category of Duranguense Artist of the Year.

Also in 2010, K-Paz launched a third promotional cut, with Armando Manzanero's classic "Adoro", a duo with Lupe Esparza, the lead vocalist & bassist of Bronco in a vibrant duranguense version.

=== Felicitas, widow of Gómez ===
In 2011, K-Paz De La Sierra suffers a further break from members Juan Gómez and Miguel Galindo due to mismanagement of the group.

In 2012 the group suffered another collapse, leaving their archives, Sergio Caballero (keyboardist) and Jair Loredo (drummer) for alleged salary debit by Felicitas. In October 2012 the group of Felicitas, launched "El Fuerte" and for May 2014 launched "En Esta Cantina".

=== K-Paz de la Sierra: lawsuit (2016–present) ===
In April 2016 the lawsuit for the name of K-Paz De La Sierra came to an end as Sergio Gómez's widow, Felicitas Gómez won, even with threats of Juan Gómez going to jail. In mid-2016 Sergio Caballero returned to K-Paz de la Sierra.

The group prepared a new record production in October 2016 titled "Indestructible", that will feature Horacio Palencia (Cambiemos el Trato), Luciano Moon (Le Atine), Gabriel Flowers (Quien Invento El Amor), Cecilia Cádiz, Pablo Castro (Para Amarte) and Sergio Caballero (Indestructible) theme emerging as the first single. Following the lawsuit the official alignment of K-Paz de la Sierra was as follows:

- Luis Eduardo Guadarrama: voice
- Jorge Garduño: Electric Tuba
- Gabriel Guadarrama: Keyboards
- Romelio Crespo: Tambora
- Frank Sánchez: Battery

In 2017, K-Paz De La Sierra began their tour throughout the United States and Mexico, spreading their music and name. A band's ex-member Juan Gómez was alleged to use the name of K-Paz De La Sierra illegally in other countries in Central and South America deceiving fans of the group. Its members always invite businessmen not to be cheated or cheated by these misleading groups that only hurt the fans of K-Paz De La Sierra.

The group conducts international tours in Central America with success in Guatemala, along with the success the band had with their first visit to Colombia.

== Discography ==
=== Albums ===
- 2003: Arrasando Con Fuego
- 2004: Pensando En Ti
- 2005: Más Capaces que Nunca
- 2006: Conquistando Corazones
- 2007: Capaz de Todo Por Ti
- 2009: Como Un Tatuaje
- 2011: Para Toda La Vida

=== Compilations ===
- 2004: 20 Éxitos con la Fuerza Duranguense
- 2008: Una Historia
- 2009: Con Banda

=== Live albums ===
- 2004: En Vivo
- 2008: En Vivo: Desde el Auditorio Nacional

=== Singles ===
- 2003 Con Olor a Hierba
- 2003 Jambalaya
- 2003 Imposible Olvidarte
- 2004 Volveré
- 2004 Mi Vecinita
- 2004 Si Tú Te Fueras de Mi
- 2005 Mi Credo
- 2005 Pero Te Vas Arrepentir (ft. José Manuel Zamacona)
- 2005 Silueta de Cristal
- 2006 Y Aquí Estoy (ft. Ana Gabriel)
- 2006 Procuro Olvidarte
- 2006 Amor Mío
- 2007 Un Buen Perdedor (ft. Franco de Vita)
- 2007 Volveré
- 2007 Al Diablo con los Guapos (No Me Supiste Querer) (ft. Allisson Lozz)
- 2008 Querido Amigo
- 2009 Como un Tatuaje
- 2009 Adoro (ft. Lupe Esparza)
- 2010 Ni Se Te Ocurra (ft. Sergio Vega "El Shaka")
- 2012: El Poeta (ft. Chino y Nacho)
- 2013: El Fuerte
- 2014: En Esta Cantina
- 2017: Indestructible
- 2018: Desde Hoy
- 2021: Volver a Enamorarme
- 2022: Mujer Ardiente
- 2023: El Día Que Puedas
- 2025 Te Lo Pido Porfavor

== Awards and nominations ==
Organization	Category	Work	Year	Result
Lo Nuestro Awards	Duranguense Artist of the Year - Regional Mexican		2007	Winner
Lo Nuestro Awards	Duranguense Artist of the Year - Regional Mexican		2012	Winner
Latin Grammy Awards	Best Banda Album	Pensando En Ti	2005	Nominated
Grammy Awards	Best Banda Album	Conquistando Corazones	2008	Nominated
