= Mentira (Hernaldo Zúñiga song) =

Single by Hernaldo Zúñiga

from the album A Tanto Fuego
- Released: 1982
- Length: 4:36
- Label: Zafiro
- Songwriter: Buddy Richard

Hernaldo Zúñiga singles chronology
""Procuro olvidarte" -" (1980)	"Mentira" (1982)	""Siglo XX" -" (1984)

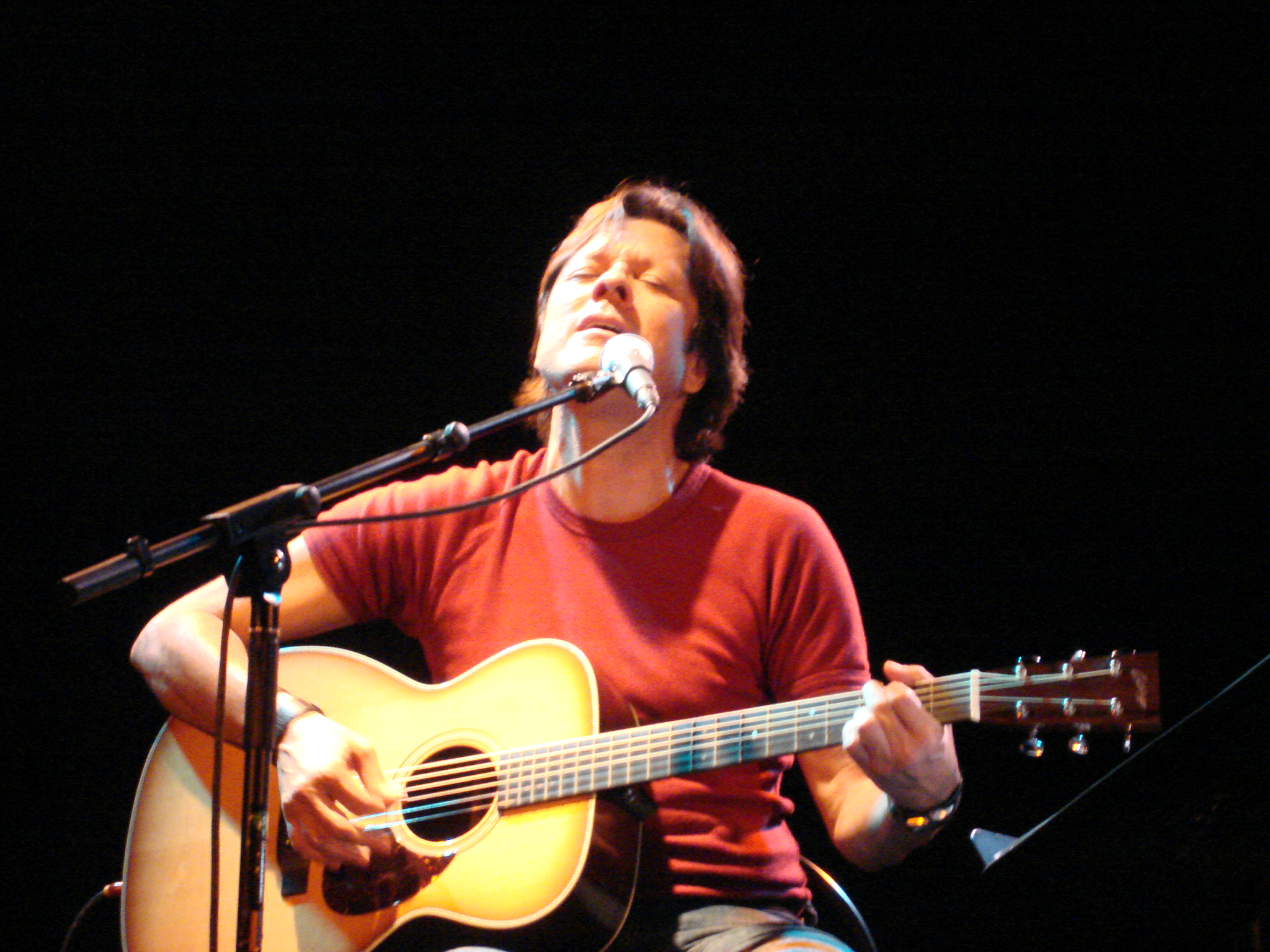
Performer who popularized the song, Hernaldo Zúñiga

Mentira (Lie) is a song composed by Chilean Buddy Richard in 1982 and was a huge international hit for Nicaraguan singer, songwriter and composer Hernaldo Zúñiga and, almost simultaneously, it also meant a major success for Argentinian Valeria Lynch. This song was composed by Richard to participate in 1982 Chilean television contest "Aplauso" ("Applause") on Channel 13, which he won.

Hernaldo said "I heard it on the telecast of a musical contest in Santiago, Chile, while sitting in the room of a hotel", after this, he did, for this song, the first recorded version that appeared in a disc, and released it in his 1982 album entitled "A Tanto Fuego" ("On So Much Fire"). Meanwhile, Lynch included it in his hit album "Quiéreme" ("Love Me") the same year.

For Zúñiga, this song, the same as his previous success "Procuro olvidarte" ("I try to forget you"), was strong in the international music scene, topping the charts in Latin America, from then until now, it is an inevitable part of his repertoire in concerts and unquestionably it has given him countless satisfactions in his artistic career.

Due to the enormous international success of "Mentira" ("Lie"), it has been recorded and covered by important artists such as the aforementioned Hernaldo Zúñiga (who in addition to the studio version, released two great live versions) and Valeria Lynch, also Buddy Richard (the composer), Ornella Vanoni, Iva Zanicchi, Kika Edgar, and more recently, Yuridia, on her debut album "La Voz de un Ángel" ("Voice of an Angel"), Nelson Teran, on his album "Mi trova mi cariño" (My ballad my affection), Manuel Mijares, in his covers album "Vivir Así" ("Live Like This") and the Trío Sol y Do, among others.
