= Hal Chamberlin =

American sound engineer

Howard Allen Chamberlin, Jr. is an American audio engineer and writer from North Carolina, most widely known as the author of the book Musical Applications of Microprocessors.

== Biography ==
In the 1970s while still at school he built an analog electronic music synthesizer and then a 16 bit computer from surplus IBM 1620 core memories to control it.

He was awarded an MSc in Communication Engineering from NCSU in 1973. The subject of his thesis was the design of a digital music synthesizer utilising an organ keyboard and a Tektronix 453 oscilloscope for a graphics display.

In November 1974 together with others began The Computer Hobbyist magazine.

In 1977 he first published wavetable synthesis in Byte's September 1977 issue and together with David B. Cox started Micro Technology Unlimited. At Micro Technology Unlimited, in 1981, he designed the 6502-based MTU-130/140 microcomputer and the Digisound-16, an early digital to analog converter.

His seminal book Musical Applications of Microprocessors was first published in 1979.

In 1983, he completed design and construction of the electronics and computer for the Notebender, an innovative keyboard controller with keys that move toward and away from the performer as well as downward.

In 1986 he left MTU to work for Kurzweil Music Systems where he remained in one engineering role or another until retirement in 2014. While there amongst other projects he designed the Kurzweil K150

In 1992 he moved to Boston.

== See also ==
- Homebrew Computer Club
- AIM-65
