= Sergio Vega (singer) =

Mexican singer (1969–2010)

Background information
- Also known as: El Shaka, "El Rey de la Banda y Norteño”
- Born: José Sergio Vega Cuamea; September 12, 1969
- Origin: Ejido Hornos, Sonora, Mexico
- Died: June 26, 2010 (aged 40) Los Mochis, Sinaloa, Mexico
- Occupation: Regional Mexican singer
- Instruments: Vocals, bajo sexto
- Years active: 1981–2000, 2004–2010
- Labels: Joey Records; Universal
- Website: Sergio Vega

José Sergio Vega Cuamea (September 12, 1969 – June 26, 2010), better known by his stage name "El Shaka", was a regional Mexican singer. He was born in Ejido Hornos, Sonora, located near Ciudad Obregón in Mexico. On June 26, 2010, he was killed by gunfire in the Mexican state of Sinaloa after a car chase. The assailants pursued Sergio Vega for a distance, shooting at him and his passenger Montiel Sergio Ávila 30 times. He was killed and Ávila was seriously injured. Vega had recently increased his security because of murder of other celebrities like Sergio Gómez.

== Career ==
Vega, eighth of thirteen children, immigrated to the United States in 1988. In 1989, while living in Phoenix, Arizona, he joined his brother's group Los Hermanos Vega as a singer and bajo sextist, which signed with Joey Records and had several hits such as "Corazón de Oropel" and "El Rayo de Sinaloa".

In 1994, after five years with the group and following a falling out with his brothers, Vega decided to leave, forming another group called Los Rayos del Norte, and signing with Digital Universal. This group had hits such as "Las Parcelas de Mendoza", "El Dólar Doblado", "El Ayudante", "Olor a Hierba", "Eres mi Estrella", and "Ayúdame a Vivir".

After three years under this name Vega decided, for publicity reasons, to change the name of his group to Sergio Vega y Sus Shakas Del Norte, which it has remained to the present day. Two of his most recent album releases included Me Gusta Estar Contigo (2004), and Cuando El Sol Salga Al Reves (2007) and his latest album El Jefe De Plazas (2008) with hits like "Disculpe Usted" and "Que Se Mueran Los Feos".

== Death ==
After receiving death threats for years, Vega was murdered on June 26, 2010, while on his way to perform at a concert at a village festival in the Mexican state of Sinaloa. Gunmen travelling in a truck drove alongside his red Cadillac and opened fire on the vehicle. They then reportedly fired shots at Vega's head and chest at close range.

At the time of his death, rumours had been circulating online that he had already been killed. Just hours before he was shot, Vega was interviewed for an article on entertainment website La Oreja, in which he confirmed that he was alive.

Vega was a singer of narcocorridos — ballads that celebrate the lives of drug dealers. Musicians who play this kind of music in Mexico are known to sometimes become the targets of rival gangs.

== Discography ==
- 1999: Los Puros Corridos Shakas
- 2000: Te Quiero
- 2002: Oro Norteño
- 2004: Frente A Frente
- 2004: Serie Top 10
- 2005: Éxitos Eternos
- 2005: Corazón de Oropel
- 2005: 18 Éxitos Eternos
- 2006: Grandes Éxitos Románticos
- 2006: Necesito Dueña
- 2006: Puros Madrazos: Rancheras y Corridos
- 2006: Plaza Nueva
- 2007: Muchachita de Ojos Tristes
- 2007: Dueño de Ti
- 2007: Cuando El Sol Salga Al Revés
- 2009: Quién Es Usted
- 2009: Puras Cumbias
- 2009: Puros Corridos y Norteñas
- 2009: Colecion Privada – Las 20 Exclusivas
- 2010: Cosas Raras (Single)
- 2010: Rey de la Banda y Norteño
- 2010: Millonario de Amor
- 2010: A Mi Gente...Mis Canciones
- 2011: Recordando Al Shaka
- 2011: Lo Mejor de Sinaloa
- 2012: Puros Corridos Shakas
- 2012: 30 Años
- 2012: Con la Luz de un Rayo
- 2012: Pa' la Raza Enamorada
- 2012: Sergio Vega 20 Exitos
- 2012: Mis Favoritas
- 2013: A Traves de La Luna
- 2013: El 21 Black Jack
- 2014: Desde El Cielo
- 2016: Serie Éxitos
- 2016: Club Corridos Presenta: Amores Pasados
- 2019: Solo Éxitos
