= Más Capaces que Nunca =

Más Capaces Que Nunca

Studio album by K-Paz de la Sierra
- Released: September 27, 2005
- Recorded: 2005
- Genre: Duranguense
- Length: 39:03
- Label: Disa

K-Paz de la Sierra chronology
Pensando En Ti (2004)	Más Capaces Que Nunca (2005)	Conquistando Corazones (2006)

Singles from Mas Capaces Que Nunca
- 1. "Mi Credo" Released: 2005; 2. "Pero Te Vas a Arrepentir" Released: 2005; 3. "Silueta de Cristal" Released: 2006

Más Capaces Que Nunca is the third studio album by duranguense band K-Paz de la Sierra.

== Track listing ==
No.	Title	Length
1.	"Pero Te Vas a Arrepentir [featuring José Manuel Zamacona]"	03:12
2.	"Silueta de Cristal"	04:40
3.	"Mi Última Parranda"	03:48
4.	"El Pasadiscos"	03:30
5.	"Oh! Carol"	03:05
6.	"Un Caballero"	03:57
7.	"Quién Pompo"	03:17
8.	"He Venido a Pedirte Perdón"	04:18
9.	"El Hijo Desobediente"	02:56
10.	"Muñeca de Ojos de Miel"	03:18
11.	"Mi Credo"	03:02
Total length:		39:03

== Chart performance ==
Chart (2005)	Peak position
US Billboard Top Latin Albums	1
US Billboard Regional/Mexican Albums	1
US Billboard 200	72

=== Singles ===
Name	Chart (2005)	Peak position
Mi Credo	U.S. Billboard Hot Latin Tracks	9

== Sales and certifications ==
Region	Certification	Certified units/sales
United States (RIAA)	2× Platinum (Latin)	200,000^{^}
^{^} Shipments figures based on certification alone.
