= AK-7 =

Mexican musical group

- Origin: Chicago
- Genres: Duranguense
- Years active: 2007 – present
- Label: Fonovisa
- Members: José Pérez - vocals 2011-present; Simón Valtierrez Valles - tololoche; Álvaro Hernández - keyboard; Armando Rodríguez - tambora 2007-present; Carmelo Gamboa - drums 2007-present; Óscar Ledesma - keyboard 2007 - present (appears in concerts outside of the U.S. only)
- Past members: Gerardo Ramírez 2007-2010; Luis Vidales 2007-2013; Javier Burciaga; Rafael Solís 2007-2012; Alfredo Hernández 2007-2011; Kareem López 2008-2011; Guillermo Rocha
- Website: Facebook.com/AK7oficial

AK-7, also known as "The Musical Phenomenon", is a Mexican duranguense band formed in 2007. They released their first album with ten songs, three of them unpublished and a bonus track.

== History ==
On May 28, 2007, 7 long-time members of the group of K-Paz De La Sierra left because of disputes with the former lead singer Sergio Gómez, and formed a new group named AK-7. The name is derived from "Antes(Before) K-Paz" and the number of members that left. They released their first album soon after, El Avion de Las Tres, following their first single of the same name "El Avión de las Tres".

On April 1, 2008, AK-7 announced they were recording a new album called Renaciendo. Singles from the album were "Digale" and "Hotel de Carretera".

On February 23, 2010, AK-7 released their third album, Reafirmando El Vuelo, with the singles "Loco Enamorado" and "El Diferente".

On November 10, 2010, AK-7 released their fourth album, Locura Romantica, with the singles "Dame Un Beso y Dime Adios" and "Locura Automatica".

== Members ==
- José Pérez - Vocals
- Luis Kpazillo - Keyboard
- Álvaro Hernández - Keyboard
- Armando Rodríguez - Tambora
- Carmelo Gamboa - Drums
- Óscar Ledesma - Keyboard (concerts outside of U.S. only)

== Discography ==
=== Albums ===
- 2007: El Avión de las Tres
- 2008: Renaciendo
- 2010: Reafirmando El Vuelo
- 2011: Locura Romantica
- 2013: Arquitecto de Tu Amor
- 2023: Reservado

=== Singles ===
- 2007: "El Avión de las Tres"
- 2007: "La Llamada"
- 2008: "Este Corazón Llora"
- 2008: "Digale"
- 2009: "Hotel de Carretera"
- 2009: "Loco Enamorado"
- 2010: "El Diferente"
- 2010: "Dame un Beso y Dime Adios"
- 2011: "Locura Automatica"
- 2015: "Insensible"
- 2021: "Hazme Creer"
- 2021: "Ya Acabó"

== Awards ==
- Lo Nuestro Awards: 2009 Breakout Artist or Group of the Year
