= Korg X3 =

Music

X3
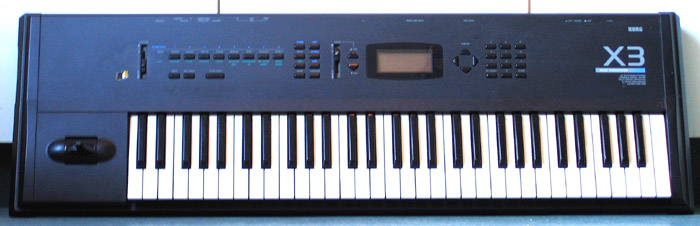
- Manufacturer: Korg
- Dates: 1993

Technical specifications
- Polyphony: 32
- Timbrality: 16
- Synthesis type: Digital Sample-based Subtractive
- Effects: 2

Input/output
- Keyboard: 61-key Velocity Sensitive, Aftertouch
- Left-hand control: Pitch + Modulation

The Korg X3 is a music workstation produced by Korg in 1993.

== Background ==
The Korg X3 was introduced as a successor to the popular Korg M1 and 01/W models, utilizing an enhanced version of the AI2 synthesis engine from the 01/W. Unlike its predecessors, the X3 featured a General MIDI soundset but omitted the 01/W's waveshaping feature, replacing it with a parameter called 'colour', which functioned as an enhancer designed to simulate filter resonance. Additionally, the X3 substituted the Yamaha-built keyboards of the M and 01 series with a lighter-action keyboard manufactured by Fatar. The X3 also increased the number of multisamples available from 255 to 340, although fit the additional wavforms within the same 6MB ROM space as 01/W, meaning the additional and any replacement waveforms were shorter and/or of a lower bit-depth (the specifications of both units' tone generator allow both 8- and 12-bit PCM), as there is no evidence of any data- or audio-compression schemes employed by the AI/AI^2 series.

== Sounds and features ==
The Korg X3 is a PCM sample-based synthesizer equipped with 6Mb of waveform memory. Its sound programs are organized into banks A, B, and a General MIDI (GM) bank, with banks A and B each containing 100 programs and the GM bank comprising 136 programs. Additionally, the X3 features two combination banks (A and B) that allow up to eight programs to be layered and assigned to specific keyboard zones. The instrument also includes 164 drum sounds distributed across eight ROM kits and four user-configurable kits.

The X3's 16-track sequencer can handle up to 32,000 notes and supports storage of ten songs and 100 patterns simultaneously. Its effects section includes two independent processors capable of generating 47 different effects; the first 37 are individual effects, effects 38 and 39 are configured in series, and the last eight are parallel effects.

== Variants ==
The Korg X3R, released as the rack-mounted counterpart to the X3 synthesizer, houses all the same features within a 19-inch rack format. The 05R/W was a more compact module that retained the X3's core features while omitting the sequencer and reducing the number of patches. It also featured a direct serial connection for compatibility with Mac or PC. In 1994, Korg launched the X2, a 76-note keyboard variant of the X3. Additionally, the X5 was developed using the X3's synthesis engine but lacked the floppy drive and sequencer of its predecessor.
