= El Trono de México =

Regional Mexican band

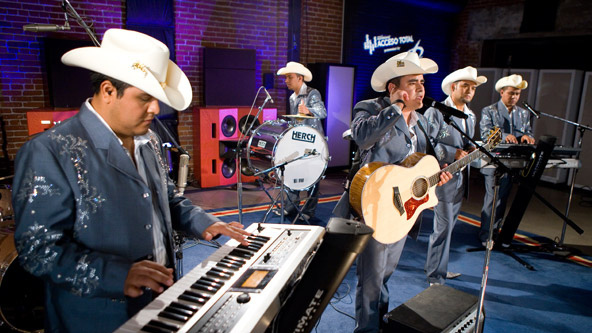
- El Trono de México at Acceso Total

Background information
- Origin: Santo Tomás de los Plátanos, Mexico
- Genres: Regional Mexican, Duranguense, Tierra Caliente
- Years active: 2004–present
- Members: Everardo Marcelino Ávila (vocals and director); Carlos Enrique Martínez Cruz (drums); Luis Alberto López Terán (percussion and drums); Yoovany Bautista Morales (animator); Odilon Marcelino Ávila (animator); Ouani Marcelino Ávila (vocals and keyboards)
- Website: tronodemexico.com

El Trono de México is a regional Mexican band from the state of Mexico. The group was formed in 2004, in Santo Tomás de los Plátanos, a town within the state of Mexico and began their career with "Registros Skalona".

They released the albums Dos Veces Mexicano (2004), El Pesudo (2005), El Muchacho Alegre (2006), and Fuego Nuevo (2007). The last two albums contain the biggest hits of the group: "No Te Apartes de Mi", "Ganas de Volver Amar", and "Se Fue".

They were one of the biggest artists in the Duranguense movement during the genre's peak of popularity in the mid to late 2000s. In more recent years, they have also recorded songs in the Tierra Caliente style.

== Discography ==
=== Studio albums ===
List of studio albums, with selected details, chart positions and certifications
Title	Details	Peak chart positions			Certifications
Title	Details	US	US Latin	MEX Reg.	Certifications
Soy Dos Veces Mexicano	Released: 2004	—	—	—	
El Pesudo	Released: 2005	—	—	—	
El Muchacho Alegre	Released: 2006	—	—	—	
Fuego Nuevo	Released: 2007	—	—	—	RIAA: Platinum (Latin)
Cruzando Fronteras	Released: 2008	171	9	5	
Almas Gemelas	Released: 2008	200	4	1	RIAA: Gold (Latin)
Hasta Mi Final	Released: 2009	184	4	2	
Quiero Decirte Que Te Amo	Released: 2010	92	2	2	
Sigo Estando Contigo	Released: 2011	124	5	2	
A Corazon Abierto	Released: 2012	—	—	—	
Irremplazable	Released: 2013	145	4	3	
Que Bonita Es La Vida	Released: 2014	88	—	—	
Cumpliendo Sueños	Released: 2018	—	—	—	
Esclavo y Rey	Released: 2021	—	—	—	

=== Compilations ===
- 2008: Las Famosas del Trono: Grandes Éxitos
- 2015: Los Mas Grandes

=== Live albums ===
- 2009: Desde la Patria en Vivo!
- 2010: En Vivo Desde Nueva York
