= Buddy Richard en el Astor =

Live album by Buddy Richard
- Released: 1969
- Recorded: December 10, 1969
- Genre: Soul, rock
- Label: RCA Victor, Warner Music Chile

Buddy Richard chronology
Buddy Richard y Sus Amigos (1964)	Buddy Richard en el Astor (1969)	Quiera Dios (1971)

Buddy Richard en el Astor (English: Buddy Richard at the Astor) is a live album by Chilean singer Buddy Richard. The album was recorded in late 1969 at the Teatro Astor (Astor Theatre) in Santiago with collaborations by the Orchestra of Horacio Saavedra. Buddy Richard en el Astor was the first live album ever recorded and released by a Chilean artist. The album was ranked 12th in the Rolling Stone's Los 50 Mejores Albumes Chilenos (Best 50 Chilean albums) list.

== Background, recording and release ==
The late 1960s were a successful time for Buddy Richard, a singer from Graneros, whose professional career started earlier that decade. Some of his songs, including "Quiera Dios" ("May God Want To"), "Amor Por Tí" ("Love for You"), and "Con Mi Bombo y Mi Chinchín" ("With My Drum and My Rattle") sold very well and received high airplay in Chilean radios.

In late November–early December 1969, Buddy Richard performed his greatest hits at the Teatro Astor in Santiago, in a concert which was broadcast via radio and television. Thirty-eight orchestral performers from the Orquesta de Horacio Saavedra (Orchestra of Horacio Saavedra) collaborated.

Following his performance at the Teatro Astor, Buddy Richard began a national tour to promote the first live album ever recorded by a Chilean. The album was very popular and sold well. Buddy Richard en el Astor "became a point of reference" to other Chilean artists, which included José Alfredo Fuentes and Gloria Simonetti.

On 31 March 2003, the album was re-issued in compact disc format under the title Buddy Richard y la orquesta de Horacio Saavedra en vivo (Buddy Richard and the Orchestra of Horacio Saavedra Live) by Warner Music Chile. Four years later, in April 2008, Buddy Richard en el Astor was ranked the twelfth best Chilean album ever by the Rolling Stone magazine.

== Track listing ==
1. Obertura
2. Característica
3. "Eloise" (Paul Ryan)
4. "No Puedo Quitar Mis Ojos de Tí" ("Can't Take My Eyes off You", by Bob Crewe)
5. "Selección Recuerdos de Buddy Richard" including "Cielo" ("Sunny", by Bobby Hebb), "Sé" (M.B. and Robin Gibb), "Dulcemente" (Stevens/Redd), "Despídete con un Beso", and "Espérame"
6. "Señor Chaplin" (Alberto Cortez)
7. "No Puedo Dejar de Amarte" (Gibson)
8. "Angelitos Negros" (Andrés Eloy Blanco)
9. "Selección recuerdos" including "No Me Corresponde Decirlo" (Robert Allen/Al Stillman), "Por Tu Amor" (Townsend), "Yo Creo" (Ervin Drake/Irvin Graham/Jimmy Shirl/Al Stillman)
10. "Selección Temas Soul" including "Una Blanca Palidez" ("A Whiter Shade of Pale", by Reid/Brooker), "He Sido Herido" ("I've Been Hurt", by Ray Whitley), and "Hey Jude" (Lennon/McCartney)
11. "Balada de la Tristeza"
12. Característica final
