= Conductive elastomer =

A conductive elastomer is a form of elastomer, often natural rubber or other rubber substitute, that is manufactured to conduct electricity. This is commonly accomplished by distributing carbon or other conductive particles throughout the raw material prior to setting it. Carbon black and silica are common additives to induce conductivity in elastomers. Silica has been studied more so than other additives due to its low cost however, its conductance is also lower. These additives can not only enable conductance but can increase the mechanical properties of the elastomer.

Conductive elastomers are often pressure-sensitive, with their conductivity varying with the amount of pressure put on it, and can be used to make pressure sensors.

Other uses of conductive elastomers include conductive flexible seals and gaskets, and conductive mats used to prevent electrostatic damage to electronic devices. These elastomers also have uses in the energy industry, where they could be used to make flexible solar cells or stretchable devices for converting mechanical energy to electrical energy. Making solar cells and various sensors able to stretch and bend would allow them to be incorporated into wearable electronics.

Recently, there has also been focus on preparation of elastomers that do not lose conductivity upon stretching. A novel approach for the design of an elastomer that actually increases conductivity with strain has recently been published.

== See also ==
- Metal rubber
- Magnetorheological elastomer
- Elastomeric connector
