= Fatar =

Italian company who supplies keyboard instruments

- Industry: Keyboards
- Founded: Italy (1956)
- Founder: Lino Ragni
- Headquarters: Recanati, Italy
- Revenue: 15 million euros
- Website: http://www.fatar.com

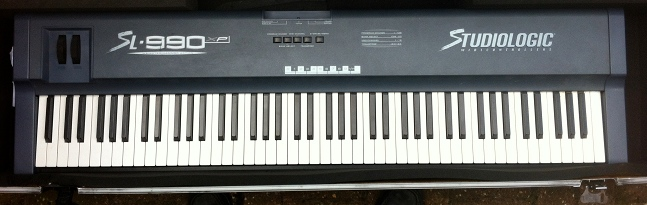
A Fatar Studiologic SL 990-XP keyboard controller

Fatar is an Italian supplier of actions for digital pianos, synthesizers and organs, based in Recanati, Italy.

The company was founded by Lino Ragni in 1956. It patented its own hammer-action prototype in 1989 and introduced the conductive-rubber contact in 1990. The company has since produced both its own "Studiologic" brand of MIDI controllers and other keyboard instruments, supplies keyboards for third-party manufacturers, and manufactures electronic sustain pedals.

In 2008, Fatar released the Numa keyboard controller, which was constructed entirely from acrylonitrile butadiene styrene (ABS) and allowed the user to define their own velocity curves.
