= Buddy Richard =

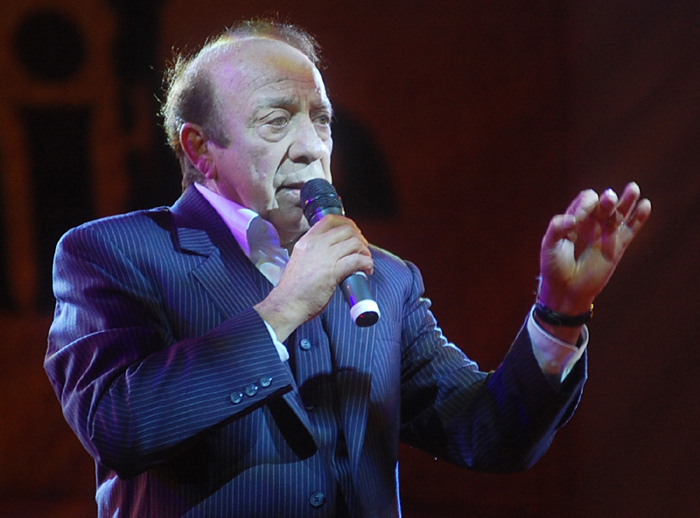
- Buddy Richard in a concert, 2010

Background information
- Born: Ricardo Roberto Toro Lavín; September 21, 1943 (age 82); Graneros, Chile
- Genres: Pop, rock, Nueva ola
- Occupations: Singer-songwriter; Composer
- Years active: 1962–2008 (as singer); 1962-2011 (as composer)
- Website: www.buddyrichard.scd.cl

Ricardo Roberto Toro Lavín, also known as Buddy Richard (September 21, 1943, Graneros) is a Chilean singer-songwriter known for his ballads.

He began performing as part of the "Nueva ola" ("New wave"). He first recorded in 1962, recording his own songs and singing in Spanish. He signed to Caracol and released his first single, Balada de la tristeza, which became a hit in the summer of 1963. The following year he signed with Arena and released his most well-known songs, Cielo (as a way to say "Honey", a cover of the Bobby Hebb song Sunny), Despídete con un beso ("Say goodbye with a kiss") and Si me vas a abandonar ("If you are going to leave me"). His 1969 live album, Buddy Richard en el Astor, was broadcast live on Chilean television and radio, one of the first live broadcasts in the country. His 1975 song Tu cariño se me va ("Your love leaves me") and his 1982 song Mentira ("Lie") (made popular by the Nicaraguan singer Hernaldo Zúñiga) became popular across Latin America. After a lull in his career, he again became popular in 1993 after recording with the band Los Tres.

He retired from public performance in 2008, playing his last concert at the Quinta Vergara on 25 February at the Viña del Mar International Song Festival. With producer Daniel Guerrero he wrote his first song in fifteen years for his retirement, titled Trátame bien ("Treat me good").

== Studio albums ==
- Buddy Richard y sus amigos (Buddy Richard and His Friends) (1964)
- Buddy Richard en el Astor (Buddy Richard at the Astor) (1969)
- Quiera Dios (If God Wants) (1971)
- ¡Buddy! (1974)
- Si me vas a abandonar (If You Are Going to Abandon Me) (1976)
- Maldito amor (Damn Love) (1985)
- Con tanto amor (With So Much Love) (1988)
- Por siempre (Forever) (1995)
