= Metal rubber =

Metal rubber is a broad, informal name for several conductive plastic polymers with metal ions produced by NanoSonic Inc. in cooperation with Virginia Tech. This self-assembling nanocomposite is flexible and durable to high and low pressures, temperatures, tensions, and most chemical reactions, and retains all of its physical and chemical properties upon being returned to a ground state. NanoSonic’s Metal rubber™ is an electrically conductive and flexible elastomer. It can be mechanically strained to greater than 1000% of its original dimensions while remaining electrically conductive. As Metal rubber can carry data and electrical power and is environmentally rugged, it can be used as a flexible and stretchable electrical conductor in the aerospace/defense, electronics, and bioengineering markets.

== Properties ==
Metal rubber needs to contain around 1% metal ions to maintain its conductive properties, allowing the material to retain an elastic quality as well as keeping the heavy metal component low. Metal rubber has a strain of 300% although the sheet itself can be mechanically strained to greater than 1000% of its original dimensions. The elastic modulus is 0.01 GPa and the service resistivity per square sheet is .1–100 ohms. The maximum service temperature is 170 degrees Celsius (338 degrees Fahrenheit), while the minimum service temperature is –60 degrees Celsius (–76 degrees Fahrenheit). It carries an electrical charge that can be used to transport power and data. It is typical of an elastomer to be an insulator but Metal rubber is highly conductive like metals.

== Applications ==
Metal rubber is made through a modified molecular-level self-assembly production process using precursors which NanoSonic produces in-house. Materials are manufactured in a variety of sizes and geometries. The possible uses of such a product include body armor, durable electronic sensors, various aerospace-building materials, and alternate commercial building materials. Several industries have unique needs that are met by Metal rubber's characteristics.

1. Aerospace/Defense

Robust under harsh conditions (high and low temperature/pressure).

2. Electronics

Stretchable electrical conductors/sensors.

3. Bioengineering Markets

Flexible with no corrosion. Useful for joint replacement instead of heavy metal implants.
The thicker dimensions of the Metal rubber can be used for artificial muscles because of the flexibility and conductive properties for bio-electrical signals.

== Current products ==
NanoSonic currently offers a variety of products that incorporates Metal rubber's unique properties.

1. Metal rubber Cables

This product can be used to replace heavy metal power and data cables as well as make conductive fabrics and CNTs. Also used in lightweight EMI shielding and can be used as an elastomer cover for hoses and tubing.

2. Metal rubber Shielding

Based on nanostructured Metal rubber and carbon nanotubes, it is lightweight, environmentally durable and allows radio wave frequency selection and broadband connection.

3. Metal rubber Sensors

Allows for shear force and pressure sensors in addition to water and wind tunnel analysis at moderate/high air pressure.
