= Magnetorheological elastomer =

New Magnetic Polymers Being Invented

Magnetorheological elastomers (MREs) (also called magnetosensitive elastomers) are a class of solids that consist of polymeric matrix with embedded micro- or nano-sized ferromagnetic particles such as carbonyl iron. As a result of this composite microstructure, the mechanical properties of these materials can be controlled by the application of magnetic field.

== Fabrication ==
MREs are typically prepared by curing process for polymers. The polymeric material (e.g. silicone rubber) in its liquid state is mixed with iron powder and several other additives to enhance their mechanical properties. The entire mixture is then cured at high temperature. Curing in the presence of a magnetic field causes the iron particles to arrange in chain like structures resulting in an anisotropic material. If magnetic field is not applied, then iron-particles are randomly distributed in the solid resulting in an isotropic material. Recently, in 2017, an advanced technology, 3D printing has also been used to configure the magnetic particles inside the polymer matrix.

== Classification ==
MREs can be classified according to several parameters like: particles type, matrix, structure and distribution of particles:

=== Particles magnetic properties ===
- Soft magnetic particles
- Hard magnetic particles
- Magnetostrictive particles
- Magnetic shape-memory particles

=== Matrix structure ===
- Solid matrix
- Porous matrix

=== Matrix electrical properties ===
- Isolating matrix
- Conductive matrix

=== Distribution of particles ===
- Isotropic
- Anisotropic

== Theoretical Studies ==
In order to understand magneto-mechanical behaviour of MREs, theoretical studies need to be performed which couple the theories of electromagnetism with mechanics. Such theories are called theories of magneto-mechanics.

== Programmable magnetopolymers ==
Magnetopolymers with large remanence are typically formed by combining hard-magnetic particles with a polymer matrix. The orientation of the magnetic particles is typically controlled with an external magnetic field during the polymerization process, and then mechanically fixed after the material is synthesized. Because the Curie temperature of these magnetopolymers exceeds the temperature at which the polymer matrix would break down, they must be degaussed in order to be remagnetized. This means that the functionality of these magnetopolymers is limited and they can only be permanently programmed during manufacturing.

Programmable magnetopolymers embed athermal ferromagnetic particles in droplets of low melting point materials in polymer matrices. Above the droplet melting point, the particles have rotational freedom. The uniqueness of these composites exists in their easily reprogrammable magnetization profiles. This behaviour follows from the fact that particles (1) are athermal, (2) have Curie temperatures above the droplet melting point, and (3) are fixated in solid droplets while possessing full rotational freedom in molten droplets. This easy reprogramming is a critical characteristic for such materials to be used in a wide range of applications.

== Applications ==
MREs have been used for vibration isolation applications since their stiffness changes within a magnetic field

== See also ==
- Conductive elastomer
