= Korg N364/264 =

Music synthesizer keyboards

Korg
- Manufacturer: Korg
- Dates: 1996

Technical specifications
- Polyphony: 64 voices
- Timbrality: 16 parts
- LFO: 3 modulators
- Synthesis type: PCM rompler
- Filter: Lowpass
- Aftertouch expression: Yes
- Velocity expression: Yes
- Storage memory: 200 ROM patches + 136 ROM GS/GM patches, 4 ROM 4 drum kits + 8 ROM GM drum kits,
- Effects: 2 DSP generators, 12 algorithms (reverb, chorus, flanger, distortion, EQ, autopan and aural exciter).

Input/output
- Keyboard: 76 keys (N264), 61 keys (N364)

== Overview ==
The Korg N264 and N364 keyboards were 76- and 61-key (respectively) music workstation synthesizers based on the AI2 (Advanced Integrated System) synthesis engine, with eight megabytes of sample rom first released in 1996. They have 936 programs and combinations, featuring 430 Multisounds and 215 Drum sounds. They have 64-note polyphony. They were the first Korg keyboards to include the Real-time Pattern Play and Record (RPPR) function, which makes it possible to record and save musical phrases as patterns that can then be played back by simply pressing the assigned key. Without sampling features, these keyboards are dated today, though their sequencing function is still useful. Today, the various keyboards in Korg's Triton line are used for similar purposes.

== Models ==
The Korg NS5R half-rack module released in 1997 has a similar specification, but lacks the RPPR function.
