= Sergio Gómez (singer) =

Background information
- Born: Paulo Sergio Gómez Sánchez; 2 June 1973; Ciudad Hidalgo, Michoacán, Mexico
- Died: 2 December 2007 (aged 34) Morelia, Michoacán, Mexico
- Genre: Duranguense
- Occupations: Singer, Producer
- Years active: 2002–2007
- Label: Univision
- Formerly of: K-Paz de la Sierra; AK-7

Paulo Sergio Gómez Sánchez (2 June 1973 – 2 December 2007) was a Mexican singer who was the founder and lead vocalist of the duranguense band K-Paz de la Sierra.

== Biography ==
He was born in the city of Ciudad Hidalgo, Michoacán in 1973. In 2003, while working in Chicago in the United States, he created K-Paz de la Sierra with other native Mexicans also working in Chicago. Gomez lived in Avon, Indiana, just west of Indianapolis.

=== Death ===
Following a concert in the state of Michoacán, while traveling in a car in the early hours of a Sunday morning, Gómez and two of the group's representatives were abducted by a group of gunmen. The other passengers were later released, but Gómez's dead body was found on Morelia's outskirts, bearing signs of torture. His body had signs of severe beating and strangling, with bruises all over his chest and abdomen; his face was burned with a cigarette lighter. Early evidence suggests that the murder might have been due to Sergio dating a woman that belonged to a Narco, a stronghold for drug related gangs.

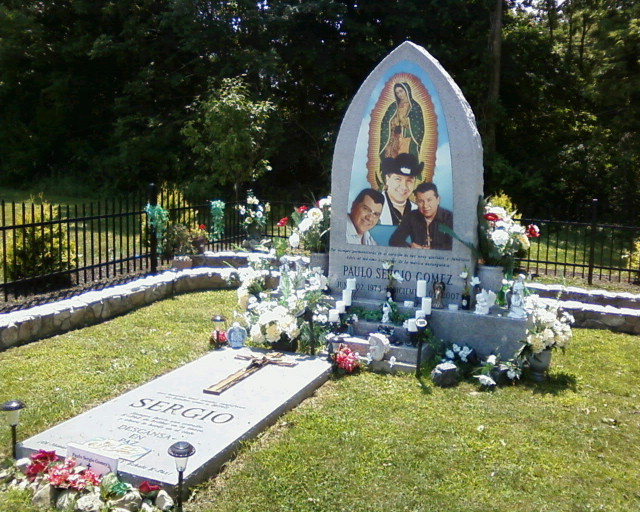
Gravesite of Gomez in Avon, Indiana

On 6 December 2007 Gómez, as well as another murdered Mexican musician, Valentín Elizalde, El Gallo De Oro were nominated posthumously for the Grammy Awards.

== See also ==
- K-Paz de la Sierra (band that Gómez created)
