= Multiword expression =

A multiword expression (MWE), also called phraseme, is a lexeme-like unit made up of a sequence of two or more lexemes that has properties that are not predictable from the properties of the individual lexemes or their normal mode of combination. MWEs differ from lexemes in that the latter are required by many sources to have meaning that cannot be derived from the meaning of separate components. While MWEs must have some properties that cannot be derived from the same property of the components, the property in question does not need to be meaning.

For a shorter definition, MWEs can be described as "idiosyncratic interpretations that cross word boundaries (or spaces)".

A multiword expression can be a compound, a fragment of a sentence, or a sentence. The group of lexemes which makup up a MWE can be continuous or discontinuous. It is not always possible to mark a MWE with a part of speech.

A MWE may be more or less frozen.

Example #1 in English: to kick the bucket, which means to die rather than to hit a bucket with one's foot. In this example, that is an endocentric compound, the part of speech may be determined as being a verb. The MWE is frozen, in the sense that no variation is possible.

Example #2 in English: to throw <somebody> to the lions. The pattern <somebody> restricts the usage. The expression is half-frozen because a certain degree of variation is possible but not everything is possible. It is not possible, for instance, to say to the three lions. Like the previous example, the part of speech is a verb.

Example #3 in French: la moutarde <me,te,lui,nous,vous,leur> monte au nez. This MWE is more frozen than the other examples. Let us add that a tense variation is allowed for the verb but we cannot determine what is the part of speech for the whole expression because it is a sentence.

== Machine translation (MT) ==
According to Sag et al. (2002), multiword expressions are, apart from disambiguation, one of the two key problems for natural language processing (NLP) and especially for machine translation (MT).

The number of MWEs in a speaker's lexicon is estimated to be of the same order of magnitude as the number of single words. Specialized domain vocabulary overwhelmingly consists of MWEs, hence, the proportion of MWEs will rise as a system adds vocabulary for new domains, because each domain adds more MWEs than simplex words.

=== Problems ===
The greatest problem for translating MWEs might be the idiomaticity problem, as many MWEs have an idiomatic sense, to a higher or a lesser degree.

For example, it is hard to predict for a system that an expression like kick the bucket has a meaning that is totally unrelated to the meaning of kick, the and bucket while appearing to conform to the grammar of English Vps. Idioms cannot be translated literally, because in many cases the idiom does not exist in an equivalent form in the target language. Attention has to be paid to syntactic and semantic (non)equivalence.

Also, not every MWE of the source language has a MWE in the target language as well. For example, the German MWE ins Auge fassen can only be translated by the English one-word term envisage.

=== Approaches ===
The most promising approach to the challenge of translating MWEs is example based MT, because in this case each MWE can be listed as an example with its translation equivalent in the target language.

In rule-based MT, it would be too difficult to define rules for translating MWEs due to the large number and variety of MWEs.

Nevertheless, an example based MT system has to apply different rules for the translation of continuous and discontinuous MWEs as it is harder to identify a discontinuous MWE in a sentence where words are inserted between the different components of one MWE.

== See also ==
- Compound (linguistics)
- Lexical Markup Framework
- Light verb construction
- n-gram
- Phraseme
