= Procuro Olvidarte =

"Procuro olvidarte"

Single by Hernaldo Zúñiga

from the album Hernaldo, El Original
- Released: 1980
- Genre: Ballad
- Length: 4:32
- Label: Zafiro
- Songwriters: Manuel Alejandro; Ana Magdalena

Hernaldo Zúñiga singles chronology
""Cancionero" –" (1978)	"Procuro olvidarte" (1980)	""Mentira" -" (1982)

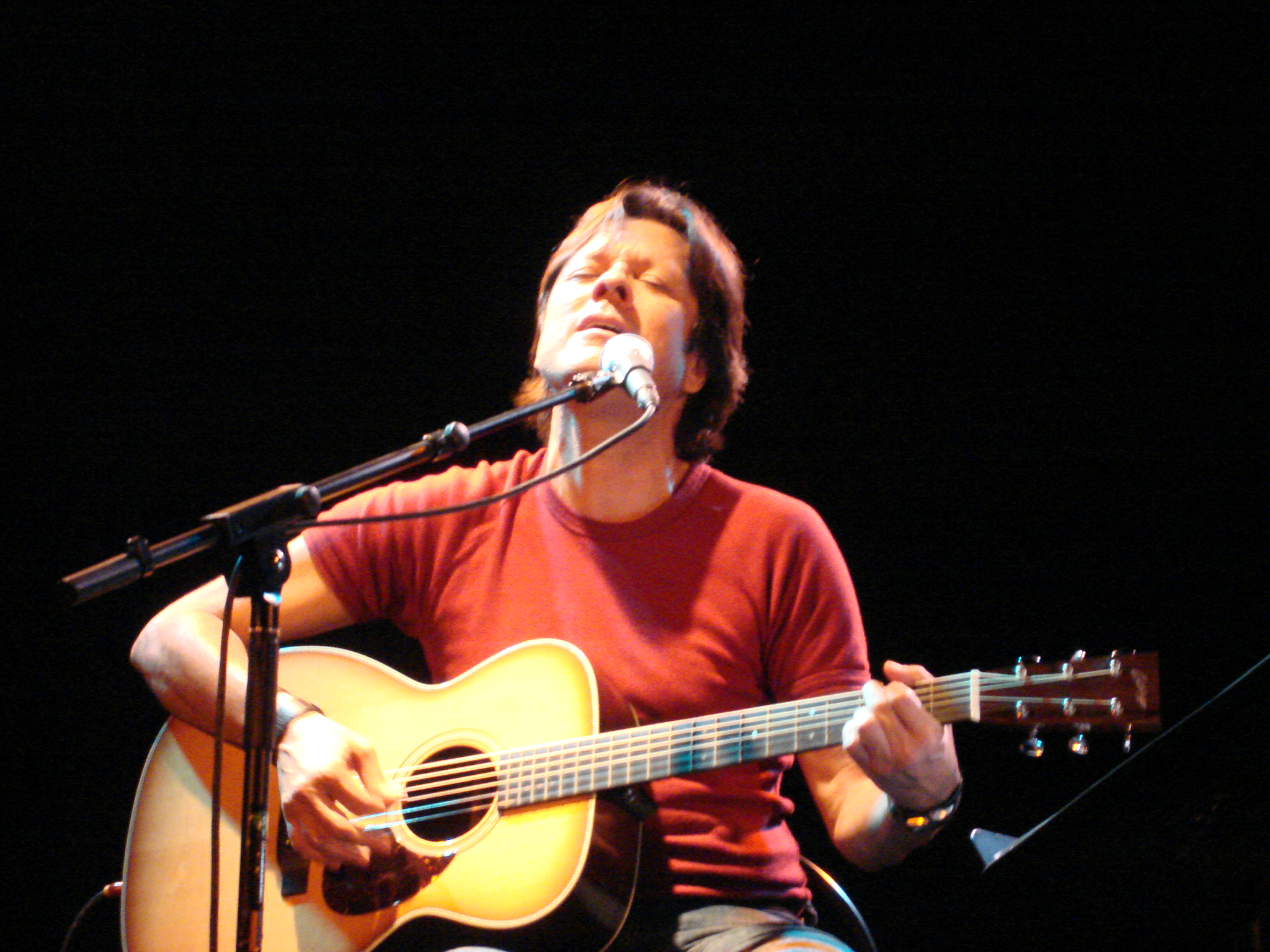
The song's original interpreter Hernaldo Zúñiga

"Procuro olvidarte" ("I try to forget you") is the name of the song that was the first international hit of the Nicaraguan singer and composer Hernaldo Zúñiga, the song was composed by Manuel Alejandro and Ana Magdalena, as the interpreter recognizes "based on a loving episode that I lived in those days", and because of his state of mind, he says, it was impossible for him to write it. This song put him in the international musical map, in a little time it reached the top of popularity and sales of Spanish language.

The song was included in the album: "Hernaldo, El Original" (Hernaldo, The Original) released in 1980, this album launched his international career, it was multi-platinum in the most part of Ibero-American countries, from it are these classic hits: "Procuro olvidarte" (I try to forget you), "Ven con el alma desnuda" (Come with the naked soul), "Un pasajero" (A passenger), "Insoportablemente bella" (Unbearable beautiful) or "Ese beso que me has dado" (That kiss that you have given me).

"Procuro olvidarte" and the other songs transform him in an international orbit interpreter.

On April 23, 2013, the song was performed as a duet by Hernaldo Zúñiga (in Spanish) and Michael Bolton (in English adapted by Desmond Child) during the first edition of the "Latin Songwriters Hall of Fame", as a tribute to song's composer, Manuel Alejandro.

This song, due to its firm and rolling success, has been object of multiple later versions in the voice of other great artists, as:
Michael Bolton and Hernaldo Zúñiga, Raphael, Alejandro Fernández in his 2009 album Dos Mundos: Evolución, Rocío Jurado, Pandora, Ricardo Montaner, Simone, Isabel Pantoja, José Luis Rodríguez "El Puma" and Raúl di Blasio, Ray Conniff, Juan Bau, K-Paz de la Sierra, Los Nocheros, Bertín Osborne, José Vélez, Mayte Martin and Tete Montoliú, Tania Libertad, Sabú, Falete, Bambino, Grupo Cali, Industria del Amor, Karina, La Apuesta, Los Forasteros, María Dolores Pradera, Sergio Vargas, Wálter Romero, Javiera y Los Imposibles, José el Francés, Adrián, Arte y Compás, Grupo Algodón, Jean Carlos, José Manuel Soto, Juan Camacho, La Tota Santillán, Mike Rodríguez, Oneil, Pecos Kanvas, Raulin Rosendo, Santaella, Sebastián, Sergio Torres, Virginia Innocenti, María del Monte, Ornella Vanoni (as "Perduto", 1992), a Salsa version was recorded and released in October 2015 by Los Angeles-based Orquesta Bonkó. In 2018, the song was covered by Spanish singers Eva Amaral and Najwa Nimri and used as part of the soundtrack in the film "¿Quién te cantará?" (Who will sing you?) by Carlos Vermut
