= Minimal reproducible example =

Source code in computing for troubleshooting

In computing, a minimal reproducible example (abbreviated MRE) is a collection of source code and other data files that allow a bug or problem to be demonstrated and reproduced. The important feature of a minimal reproducible example is that it is as small and as simple as possible, such that it is just sufficient to demonstrate the problem, but without any additional complexity or dependencies that will make resolution harder. Furthermore, it would probably expose the problem with as low as possible efforts and runtime to allow testing a new software version as efficiently as possible for the problem.

A minimal reproducible example may also be referred to as a reprex (short for "reproducible example"), a minimal working example (MWE), a minimal complete verifiable example (MCVE), or a short self-contained correct example (SSCCE).
