= Alacranes Musical =

Mexican band that specialize in the Duranguense subgenre

- Origin: Aurora, Illinois, United States
- Genre: Duranguense
- Years active: 1996-Present
- Label: A.M. Music
- Members: Oscar Urbina Jr. 1995–present Rene Urbina 1995–present Chris Urbina 2002–present Erik Urbina 2006–present Kevin "Kelso" Villalpando 2016–present Memo Ibarra 2002–2009, 2019–present Sergio "Hershey" Federico 2003–2006, 2009-2013, 2019–present
- Past members: Gabriel Diaz 2011–2013; Omar Sanchez 2006–2009, 2013–2014; Alonzo "Andy" Andez 2009–2011; Lenin Bueno 2014–2016; Hector Urbina 2003–2016; Rodolfo “Rudy” Avitia Jr 2003–2014; Jose Paz "Chema" Mijares 2001–2002, 2013–2014; Alan "Avatar" Villalpando 2017–2020; Frankie Alvarez 2015-2018; Daniel Garcia 2018-2020; Omar "Chavo" Almeida 2015–2020; Eduardo Urbina 1995-2006; Oscar Urbina Sr. 1995-2006; Joel "El Coyote" Urbina 1996-2006, Adan Cervantes 2000-2007

Alacranes Musical (English: "Musical Scorpions") are a regional Mexican band that specialize in the duranguense genre. They are from the Chicago, Illinois suburb of Aurora.

== Recordings ==
The band has released several albums since its formation in November 1999, and in 2007 was nominated for a Latin Grammy for their album, Ahora Y Siempre. Their hits "Si Yo Fuera Tu Amor" and "Por Tu Amor" reached #2 and #4, respectively, on Billboard's Latin Regional Mexican Airplay chart. Their single "Por Amarte Así," a cover of Cristian Castro's song, has topped the Billboard charts at number one for several weeks in a row. According to Billboard, "Por Amarte Así" has also been the number-one downloaded ringtone.

== Split ==
There were two Alacranes Musical touring due to arguments between the vocalists of the group, Memo Ibarra and Omar Sánchez, and the musicians of the group, the Urbina Family. They parted ways and the record label that claimed to own rights to the name of the group sided with the vocalists. The Urbina Family hired former singer Sergio "Hershey" Federico and former Banda Lamento Show singer Alonzo Andez to sing for their group. The vocalists hired all new musicians. Fans seemed to be 50-50 on the situation, many liking the originals—the Urbina Family—and many liking the vocalists. Both have recorded material under the name. In February 2011, the Urbinas posted a YouTube video declaring that the dispute was settled and that their group would be the official Alacranes Musical as of Easter weekend that year. A new album has also been announced for 2011. The other half of the group changed its name to Alerta Zero.

== Reconcile ==
In December 2019, the two most popular vocalists in Alacranes Musical's history, Guillermo "Memo" Ibarra And Sergio "Hershey" Federico, rejoined the band.

== Discography ==
- 1999 Pa' Que Son Pasiones
- 2000 Famoso Durango
- 2001 Rancheras de Corazón
- 2002 Puro Tamborazo Alacranero
- 2002 Con Fuerza Alacranera
- 2003 Furia Alacranera
- 2004 ¿A Cambio de Que?
- 2004 15 Polkas Alacraneras
- 2005 Nuestra Historia y Algo Más...
- 2005 100% Originales
- 2006 A Paso Firme
- 2006 Puros Corridos Venenosos
- 2007 Ahora y Siempre
- 2008 Tu Inspiración
- 2009 Live En Vivo Desde Mexico
- 2010 Por Siempre Alacranes
- 2011 Besos de Fuego
- 2013 Nuestra Historia de Voces
- 2014 De Corazón Ranchero
- 2016 Una Nueva Era
- 2017 Llegamos Pa' Quedarnos
- 2020 El Reencuentro
- 2021 Juntos Mejor
- 2023 Bien Machine

Singles

- 2007 Por Amarte Así
- 2008 Dame Tu Amor
- 2011 Besos de Fuego
- 2013 Tu No Tienes la Culpa
- 2013 La Suerte Viene a Buscarme
- 2014 Perdidos ft. Vicky Terrazas de Los Horóscopos de Durango
- 2015 Es Tan Perfecta
- 2015 Amor Que Nace
- 2016 Te Va Gustar
- 2016 Las Mañanitas
- 2017 El Zapateado Encabronado #5
- 2017 La Media Vuelta
- 2018 Según Por Mi Culpa
- 2018 Un Poco de Amor
- 2019 Navidad Sin Ti
- 2020 Muérdete La Lengua (ft. La Zenda Norteña)
- 2021 Me Vas a Extrañar (ft. Los Horóscopos De Durango)
- 2021 Borracho de Amor
- 2021 Una en un Millón (ft. La Zenda Norteña)
- 2021 Poemas Disparejos
- 2022 Solo Me Quiero Enamorar
- 2022 Ya Acabó
- 2022 Ando Bien Contento
- 2022 Tigres Mix
- 2023 90's Mix
