= Duranguense =

Genre of Regional Mexican music

- Native name: Música Duranguense
- Stylistic origins: Technobanda, Tamborazo
- Cultural origins: Early 1990s, Durango, Mexico
- Typical instruments: Vocals, electric keyboards, trombones, saxophones, tambora, drums

Local scenes
- Mexico, United States, Northern Triangle of Central America

Duranguense sample

Duranguense is a subgenre of regional Mexican music. It is a hybrid of Technobanda and Tamborazo. The instruments used from Tamborazo are the saxophone, trombone, and tambora, while the instruments used from Technobanda are the electronic keyboard (specifically the Korg X3, Korg N364, which are used for the main melody and the Yamaha DX7, which is used by many bands for the bass section), drum set, and vocals. The electronic keyboard is emphasized in Duranguense, giving the genre its own signature riff.

In the mid to late 2000s, Duranguense was one of the most prevalent regional Mexican genres. Duranguense was further evolved with its own "Chicago sound" as Mexican American artists from the area incorporated different rhythms and styles into the genre.

== History ==
The term duranguense refers to the people from the Mexican state of Durango. Paraíso Tropical de Durango are believed to be the first to begin the movement in the early 1990s. The genre's popularity peaked in the mid to late 2000s among the Mexican and Mexican American community in the United States, as well as in many parts of Mexico. The genre was further developed in Chicago, as its popularity grew, also popularizing the dance style, Pasito Duranguense.

== Artists ==
Other famous Duranguense acts include Montéz de Durango, K-Paz de la Sierra, Alacranes Musical, Los Horóscopos de Durango, Patrulla 81, Conjunto Atardecer, and El Trono de México.

== Repertoire ==
Styles of songs performed in Duranguense include rancheras, corridos, cumbias, charangas, ballads, boleros, sones, chilenas, polkas and waltzes.
