= List of reggaeton musicians =

This is a list of notable reggaeton artists (musicians, singers and producers) and groups.

== Argentina ==
- Bizarrap
- Cazzu
- Duki
- Emilia
- J Mena
- Khea
- Lali
- Lit Killah
- María Becerra
- Nathy Peluso
- Nicki Nicole
- Oriana
- Paulo Londra
- Tiago PZK
- Tini
- Trueno
- WOS

== Brazil ==
- Anitta
- Francinne
- Pabllo Vittar

== Chile ==
- Cris MJ
- Denise Rosenthal
- FloyyMenor
- Paloma Mami
- Polimá Westcoast
- Tomasa del Real

== Colombia ==
- Andy Rivera
- Blessd
- Cali & El Dandee
- Fariana
- Feid
- Greeicy
- J Balvin
- Juanes
- Karol G
- Kevin Roldán
- Lalo Ebratt
- Maluma
- Manuel Turizo
- Ovy on the Drums
- Piso 21
- Reykon
- Ryan Castro
- Sebastián Yatra
- Shakira
- Sky Rompiendo

== Cuba ==
- Almighty
- Cubanito 20.02
- Cuban Link
- Eddy-K
- El Medico
- El Taiger
- Gente de Zona
- Mey Vidal
- Osmani García
- Ovi

== Dominican Republic ==
- Ángel Dior
- Chimbala
- Deevani
- Doble A & Nales
- Don Miguelo
- El Alfa
- Luny Tunes
- Mozart La Para
- Natti Natasha
- Noztra
- Tokischa

== El Salvador ==
- Pescozada

== Jamaica ==
- Shaggy
- Willy William

== Mexico ==
- Alemán
- Belinda
- Bellakath
- C-Kan
- Danna Paola
- Ingratax
- Junior H
- Kenia Os
- Kim Loaiza
- MC Davo
- Natanael Cano
- Peso Pluma
- Sofía Reyes
- Thalía

== Nicaragua ==
- Torombolo

== Panama ==
- Gaby
- Fito Blanko
- El Chombo
- El General
- Dímelo Flow
- La Factoría
- Latin Fresh
- Lorna
- Nando Boom
- Flex
- Renée and Renato
- El Roockie
- Eddy Lover
- Makano
- Aldo Ranks
- Joey Montana
- Sech

== Peru ==
- Leslie Shaw
- Faraón Love Shady

== Puerto Rico ==
- Alberto Stylee
- Alexis & Fido
- Angel & Khriz
- Anuel AA
- Baby Ranks
- Baby Rasta & Gringo
- Bad Bunny
- Brytiago
- Calle 13
- Cauty
- Chencho Corleone
- Cosculluela
- Daddy Yankee
- Darell
- Divino
- DJ Blass
- DJ Luian
- DJ Nelson
- DJ Playero
- Don Omar
- Dyland & Lenny
- Echo
- Ele A el Dominio
- Erre XI
- Farruko
- Gaby Music
- Getto & Gastam
- Glory
- Guelo Star
- Héctor el Father
- Héctor & Tito
- Ivy Queen
- J Álvarez
- Justin Quiles
- Jadiel
- Jamsha
- Jay Wheeler
- Jhayco
- Johnny Prez
- Jon Z
- Jowell & Randy
- Julio Voltio
- Kendo Kaponi
- La Sista
- Las Guanábanas
- Lenny Tavárez
- Lisa M
- Lito & Polaco
- Los Tres Mosqueteros
- Luis Fonsi
- Lunay
- Lyanno
- MC Ceja
- Magnate & Valentino
- Maicol & Manuel
- Mario VI
- Master Joe & O.G. Black
- Mexicano 777
- Miguelito
- Monserrate & DJ Urba
- Musicólogo & Menes
- Musiko
- Naldo
- Nely el Arma Secreta
- Nesty la Mente Maestra
- Ñejo & Dalmata
- Ñengo Flow
- Nova & Jory
- Omar Courtz
- Ozuna
- Plan B
- Rafy Mercenario
- Ranking Stone
- Rauw Alejandro
- Residente
- R.K.M & Ken-Y
- Speedy
- Tainy
- Tempo
- Tego Calderón
- Temperamento
- Tito el Bambino
- Tony Touch
- Tony Tun Tun
- Trébol Clan
- Wibal & Alex
- Wisin
- Wisin & Yandel
- Yaga & Mackie
- Yandel
- Young Miko
- Zion & Lennox

== Spain ==
- Abraham Mateo
- Aitana
- Ana Mena
- Bad Gyal
- Enrique Iglesias
- K-Narias
- Lola Índigo
- Mala Rodríguez
- Omar Montes
- Quevedo
- Rosalía
- Saiko

== United States ==
- Adassa
- Ally Brooke
- Arcángel
- Arcángel & De la Ghetto
- Becky G
- Boy Wonder
- Camila Cabello
- CNCO
- Dalex
- De la Ghetto
- Divino
- DJ Buddha
- Don Chezina
- Eladio Carrión
- Guillermo "Pinky" Mordan
- Jessica Darrow
- Justin Quiles
- Kali Uchis
- La Doña
- Lauren Jauregui
- Lele Pons
- Leslie Grace
- Lumidee
- Mariah Angeliq
- Magic Juan
- MISSPSTAR
- N.O.R.E.
- Notch
- Nicky Jam
- Nina Sky
- Pitbull
- Prince Royce
- Romeo Santos
- Snoop Lion
- Snow Tha Product
- Solomon Ray
- Tony Dize
- Tony Touch
- Vico C
- Yomo

== Venezuela ==
- Calle Ciega
- Chino & Nacho
- Chyno Miranda
- Corina Smith
- Danny Ocean
- Mau y Ricky
- Micro TDH
- Nacho
