= Eddy Lover discography =

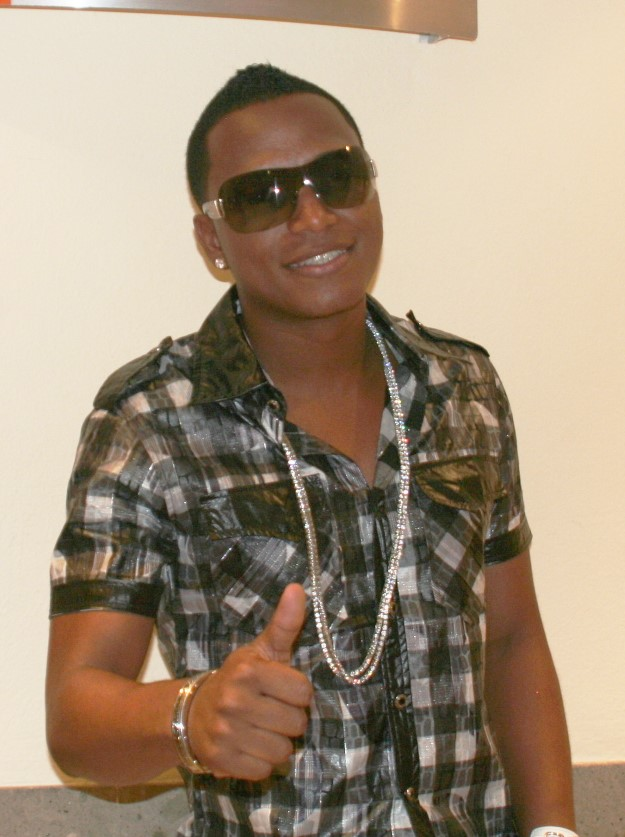
- Studio albums: 3
- Extended plays: 1
- Singles: 19
- Featured singles: 1

The discography of Eddy Lover, a Panamanian reggaeton and reggae en Español artist, consists of two studio albums and four singles (including all singles from studio, compilation albums and collaborations with other singers).

On August 12, 2008, Lover released his debut album Perdóname including the singles "Luna", "No Debiste Volver" and "Baby Cuéntale".

== Albums ==
=== Studio albums ===
Year	Title	Peak chart positions		Certifications (sales threshold)	Sales
Year	Title	^{U.S. 200}	^{U.S Latin}	Certifications (sales threshold)	Sales
2008	Perdóname: Released: August 12, 2008; Label: Machete Music	-	21		
2011	New Age: Released: March 15, 2011; Label: Machete Music	-	-		
2015	Flow Lover: Released: April 25, 2015; Label: Factory Corp.	-	-		

=== EPs ===
Year	Title	Peak chart positions		Certifications (sales threshold)	Sales
Year	Title	^{U.S. 200}	^{U.S Latin}	Certifications (sales threshold)	Sales
2009	6 Super Hits: Released: November 17, 2009; Label: Machete Music	—	—		

== Singles ==
=== Solo ===
Year	Single	Peak chart positions						Album(s)		
Year	Single	U.S. Hot 100	U.S. Hot Latin	U.S. Tropical /Salsa	U.S. Tropical	U.S. Latin Pop	U.S. R&B/Hip-Hop	Album(s)		
2008	"Luna"	—	12	—	2	30	—	Perdóname		
2008	"Mas Allá Del Sol"	—	—	—	—	—	—	6 Super Hits		
2009	"No Debiste Volver"	—	—	—	—	—	—	Perdóname		
2009	"Baby Cuéntale"	—	—	—	—	—	—	Perdóname		
2009	"Por Un Beso (feat. Jr. Ranks)"	—	—	—	—	—	—	6 Super Hits		
2009	"No He Dejado De Extrañarte"	—	—	—	—	—	—	New Age		
2010	"Me Enamoré"	—	—	—	—	—	—	New Age		
2013	"Rueda, Rueda"	—	—	—	—	—	—	Flow Lover		
2013	"No Hay Nada"	—	—	—	—	—	—	Flow Lover		
2014	"Sigues Ahí"	—	—	—	—	—	—	Flow Lover		
2014	"Pareja Imaginaria (feat. Kemzo)"	—	—	—	—	—	—	Flow Lover		
2015	"Mejor Sin Mí"	—	—	—	—	—	—	Flow Lover		
2015	"Todo O Nada"	—	—	—	—	—	—	—		
2016	de ti ni de nadie, (Feat. Kemzo)	—	—	—	—	—	—	—		
2017	El amor se gana	—	—	—	—	—	—	—	—	
2018	Ex	—	—	—	—	—	—	—	—	—
2018	Te gusta hacerla, (Feat. Akim)	—	—	—	—	—	—	—	—	—
2023	Perdonamé, (Feat. Eddy Lover, Farruko)	—	—	—	—	—	—	—	—	—

=== As featured performer ===
Year	Single	Peak chart positions						Album(s)
Year	Single	U.S. Hot 100	U.S. Hot Latin	U.S. Tropical /Salsa	U.S. Tropical	U.S. Latin Pop	U.S. R&B/Hip-Hop	Album(s)
2007	"Perdóname" (La Factoría feat. Eddy Lover)	—	12	—	26	37	—	Nuevas Metas
2018	"Mi Mejor Error", (Feat. MYM)	—		—			—	Nuevas Metas
