= Panamanian reggaetón =

Regional name for the musical genre from Panama

In Panama, reggaetón is a musical genre that is a combination of reggae, Jamaican dancehall, hip hop, soca, bomba, plena and various Caribbean music styles. Lyrics to reggaetón are typically sexually explicit and are generally rapped, but many reggaetón artists will also sing their lyrics.

== History ==
=== Beginnings ===
Reggaetón, which was formerly called reggae en Español, originated on the isthmus of Panama. The roots of Panamanian reggaetón can be traced back to the creation of the Panama Canal. During the construction of the Canal, up to 12,000 African workers and their families were brought to Panama from the West Indies. With them, these migrants brought Afrocentric music, such as rumba, mambo, the cha-cha-cha and calypso. In the 1980s, many reggae artists began to translate these music styles into Spanish and combine them with dancehall; from this, reggae en Español was formed. Often artists would translate Jamaican songs into Spanish and then proceed to sing over the original reggae melodies. These Afrocentric music styles became more popular during the rise of African movements in the 1920s. Panamanian reggae emerged as a blend of Jamaican dancehall, reggae, Trinidadian soca and calypso music. During its early years, reggae en Español was promoted by artists who would sell their demo tapes to bus drivers. Calypso has heavily influenced reggaetón, especially through its introduction of lyrical improvisation. Improvised lyrics are best exemplified by the music of El General, or Edgardo Franco. In the mid-1980s, Jamaican dancehall rap was added to the reggae en Español mix, and during the late 1980s, "reggaetón" officially emerged. One of the first reggaetón hits was "My Woman Thus Speaks"/"The Drum to Me", released by the group Nando Boom in 1985. The style grew as El General released his first single "Tu Pum Pum". Although it originated in Panama, reggaetón gets its name from Puerto Rico; Puerto Ricans preferred to call the music genre "el reggaetón", instead of "reggae en Español".

=== Spreading around the Caribbean ===
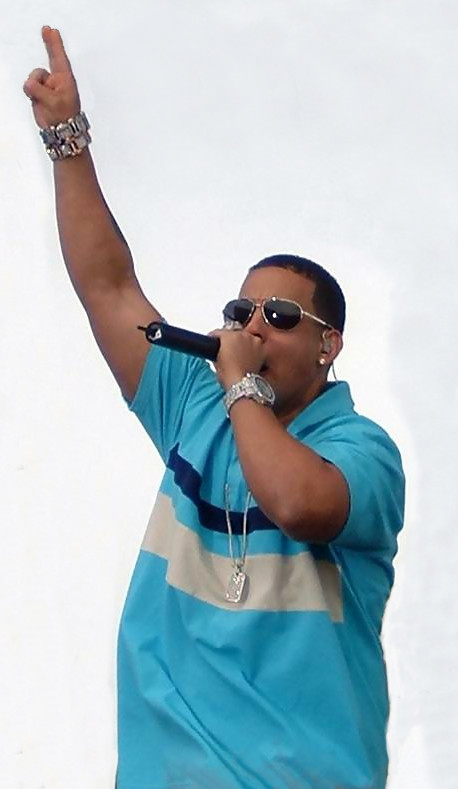
Daddy Yankee.

Although reggaetón began in Panama, it quickly spread throughout the Caribbean, and by the late 1980s/early 1990s multiple mixtures, recreations, and hybrids of the genre were formed. However, the genre became most popular within Puerto Rico, due to its massive commercial success. The country took it on as its own and it became the primary place in which reggaetón artists and stars originated. In addition, during the mid-1990s the beat "dem bow", created by Shabba Ranks, characterized the genre and gained mass popularity. This characterization of reggaetón acted as a way to set the hybrid genre apart from Panama's original sound of "Spanish reggae". At this point the genre took off, and was being produced and performed by artists throughout Latin America and the US including artists such as Daddy Yankee, Don Omar, Wisin & Yandel, Ivy Queen and more.

=== Spreading to the U.S./U.S. influence ===
While hybrids of reggaetón were very prevalent within the Caribbean and Central America, it also became highly popular within Pan-Latino/Pan-Caribbean centers such as NYC and Miami. These Pan-Latino spaces brought together Panamanians, as well as Puerto Ricans, Jamaicans, Cubans, Dominicans, and African Americans, creating various mixtures of musical styles. Reggaetón soon came into conversation with many other genres; such as hip-hop/rap and reggae within the US where it was morphed and reconstructed, forming a new version of reggaetón mixed with American hip-hop influences. An example of this is the group Los Rakas. Starting out in the early 2000s, the two cousins of Panamanian descent met in Oakland, California, and formed a musical group. Their style consists of a mixture of hip-hop influences with reggaetón, reggae and dancehall, and exemplifies one of the many hybrids of reggaetón that was and continues to be created in the US. Furthermore, these hybrids that have been created were not only influences on new reggaetón artists within the US, but they were also brought back to places such as Puerto Rico, the Dominican Republic, and Panama, and morphed and recreated there. Moreover, the musical styles were not the only part of reggaetón that morphed and changed as it entered into the US in the early 1990s. Upon its arrival, reggaetón was primarily identified and referred to as "melaza" or "música negra", signifying that the genre itself was primarily representative and interlaced with symbols of blackness. However, reggaetón's transition into the US and the mainstream changed the face of reggaetón. In the 2000s, reggaetón made its big break into the mainstream music industry when N.O.R.E and Daddy Yankee came out with their hit singles "Oye Mi Canto" and "Gasolina". These songs were key moments in the transition of reggaetón within the US, redefining many of these artists' styles and music as "Hispanic urban". During this transition, reggaetón underwent a form of Blanqueamiento in which the industry and the artists moved further away from the genres Afro-Latino roots and more towards a "Pan-Latino" identity. The genre increasingly became known as and promoted as "reggaetón Latino" in order to market the genre to a larger audience and appeal to the identity of Latinidad.

== Cultural aspects ==
=== Connections to hip-hop ===
As hip-hop is one of the main influences of reggaetón, there are many similarities between hip-hop culture and reggaetón culture. Both are heavily focused on street life. Much like in hip-hop, physical scars from experience on the street add legitimacy to an artist's image. Acts that produce the most sense of street authenticity are being shot and arrested for possession of drugs and weapons. Another aspect of hip-hop seen in reggaetón culture are artists rivalries. Within these rivalries, artists will use their music to produce lyrical disses towards one another. However, unlike hip-hop rivalries, reggaetón rivalries are not usually lethal.

=== Youth popularity ===
Similar to how salsa was a primary Latin youth cultural expression within the early 1970s, as reggaetón entered the US in the early 1990s and 2000s, it has become a mode of expression for many Latin youth. It has continued to act as a form of resistance towards the cultural imperialism produced by the US presence in Latin America. Reggaetón music acts as an outlet for Latin youth to express and comment on the struggles they experience and perceive in today's society. This mode of expression started with the early veteran artists that commented on the racial discrimination that Rastafarians, such as El General, faced in Panama. Despite reggaetón's ability to comment on racial discrimination and its roots in Afrocentric music, this genre has embraced artists of all racial and ethnic backgrounds. In this sense, it reflects the variety of races that is the reality of Latino heritage.

== List of Panamanian/Panamanian-American reggaetón artists ==
- Sech
- Pop Smoke
- El General
- Los Rakas
- Nando Boom
- El Chombo
- Renato
- Black Apache
- Aldo Ranks
- La Factoría
- Eddy Lover
- DJ Flex
- Makano
- El Roockie
- Lady Ann
- Lorna
