= Premios 40 Principales for Best Panamanian Act =

Spanish music award

- Awarded for: Best in Spanish and International music
- Country: Spain/America
- Presented by: Los 40 Principales
- First award: 2008
- Website: www.premios40principales.es

The Premios 40 Principales for Best Panamanian Act was an honor presented annually at Los Premios 40 Principales between 2008 and 2011, reemerging in 2014 as part of Los Premios 40 Principales América.

Year	Winner	Other nominees
Los Premios 40 Principales España
2008	Flex	Os Almirantes; Sr. Loop; El Roockie; Eddy Lover (featuring La Factoría)
2009	Mario Spinalli	Alejandro Lagrotta; Ivan Barrios; Post; Cienfue
2010	Iván Barrios	Manuel Araúz; Margarita Henríquez; Comando Tiburón; Jhonny D
2011	Joey Montana	Los Rabanes; Os Almirantes; Aldo Ranks; RD Maravilla
Los Premios 40 Principales América
2014	Comando Tiburón	Flex; Martin Machore; Joey Montana; I-Nesta
