= Perdóname (Eddy Lover album) =

Studio album by Eddy Lover
- Released: August 12, 2006
- Genre: Latin pop Reggae en Español; Reggaeton
- Length: 54:58
- Label: Machete Music

Eddy Lover chronology
Perdóname (2006)	6 Super Hits (2009)

Singles from Perdóname
- 1. "Luna" Released: 2008; 2. "No Debiste Volver" Released: 2009; 3. "Baby Cuéntale" Released: 2009

Perdóname (Forgive Me) is the debut album by Panamian singer-songwriter Eddy Lover. It was released on August 12, 2006. The first single of the album was titled "Luna", which garnered much airplay on the radio.

== Track listing ==
No.	Title	Length
1.	"Perdóname (Feat. La Factoría)"	4:05
2.	"Luna"	4:22
3.	"No Debiste Volver"	4:43
4.	"Gitana (Feat. Jr. Ranks)"	4:49
5.	"Quiero Hacerte el Amor"	3:46
6.	"Baja Pantalones (Feat. Mach & Daddy, Aldo Ranks & Jr. Ranks)"	4:53
7.	"Ya Tú No Vales La Pena"	3:58
8.	"Prefiero Que Te Vayas Con Él"	3:29
9.	"Vete"	3:03
10.	"Es Imposible"	2:56
11.	"Baby Cuéntale"	2:12
12.	"No Es Tan Facil"	3:13
13.	"No Quise Hacerte Daño (Feat. Original Dann)"	3:04
14.	"Dime Que No lo Amas"	2:55
15.	"No Debiste Volver (Piano Version)"	3:54

== Charts ==
Chart (2008)	Peak position
Billboard Top Latin Albums	21
Billboard Top Heatseekers	23

== Certification ==
Region	Certification	Certified units/sales
United States (RIAA)	Gold (Latin)	50,000^{^}
^{^} Shipments figures based on certification alone.
