= Dame Tu Cosita =

Single by El Chombo featuring Cutty Ranks

from the album Cuentos de la Cripta II
- Language: Spanish
- English title: "Give me your little thing"
- Released: 2 April 2018
- Recorded: 31 March 1997
- Genre: Reggaeton
- Length: 2:25
- Label: Juston Records; Ultra
- Songwriter: Rodney S. Clark

El Chombo singles chronology
"Chacarron Macarron" (2006)	"Dame Tu Cosita" (2018)	"Dame Tu Cosita (remix)" (2018)

Music video
- "Dame Tu Cosita" on YouTube

"Dame Tu Cosita" (Spanish: [ˈda.me tu ko.ˈsi.ta], lit. 'Give me your little thing') is a song by Panamanian artist El Chombo, featuring Jamaican dancehall musician Cutty Ranks. It was originally recorded on March 31, 1997, but extended and released as a single in April 2018. A remix with Pitbull and Karol G was released on August 29, 2018.

== History ==
The song was first released on El Chombo's album Cuentos de la Cripta II (1997) as a short version under the title "Introduccion B (El Cosita Mix)". A remix of the song titled "Cosita Mix (New Mix)" was released in 2001 on the album Cuentos de la Cripta Remixes, which the 2018 version is based on.

Following the song's viral Internet popularity, French record label Juston Records signed El Chombo and commissioned an extended version of the track. The label also acquired the rights to ArtNoux's video and requested a new video for the extended track.

Ultra Music acquired the worldwide distribution rights to the new, extended song and music video. In April 2018, the music video was uploaded to Ultra's YouTube channel, and its popularity skyrocketed. The track was released as a single soon after, which debuted at No. 81 on the Billboard Hot 100, eventually reaching a peak of No. 36.

== Other versions ==
=== Pitbull and Karol G remix ===
A remix with Pitbull and Karol G was released on August 24, 2018, and was produced by El Chombo and Afro Bros. The remix charted at No. 1 on the Billboard Bubbling Under Hot 100 chart, which serves as an extension to the Billboard Hot 100 chart. It also reached No. 31 on the Billboard Argentina Hot 100.

=== Gummibär version ===
A family-friendly version created by the multilingual singer character Gummibär was released in 2018 with the title "Dame la Gomita" (lit. "Give me the gum"). This version blends bubblegum with reggaeton, which received favorable reviews. Its official video also featured a dance challenge by the character. To date, the music video has over 17 million views on YouTube.

== Music video ==
The video shows an extended animation of the alien video to the full remix of "Dame Tu Cosita", animated by ArtNoux and directed by Sihem OUILLANI. The video was the seventh most-viewed music video on YouTube worldwide in 2018. As of March 2025, the YouTube video has received over 5 billion views, making it the site's 13th most-viewed video. The music video of the remix with Pitbull and Karol G was also directed by Sihem OUILLANI and was shot in Florida.

== Charts ==
=== Weekly charts ===
Weekly chart performance
Chart (2018–20)	Peak position
Argentina Hot 100 (Billboard)	31
Canada Hot 100 (Billboard)	37
Chile Airplay (Monitor Latino)	14
France (SNEP)	75
Netherlands (Global Top 40)	15
Netherlands (Streaming Top 40)	8
Puerto Rico Airplay (Monitor Latino)	19
US Billboard Hot 100	36
US Hot Latin Songs (Billboard)	1
US Latin Airplay (Billboard)	46

=== Year-end charts ===
Chart (2018)	Position
US Hot Latin Songs (Billboard)	11

== Certifications ==
Region	Certification	Certified units/sales
Poland (ZPAV)	Platinum	50,000^{‡}
United States (RIAA) (Remix)	7× Platinum (Latin)	420,000^{‡}
^{‡} Sales+streaming figures based on certification alone.

== See also ==
- List of Billboard number-one Latin songs of 2018
