= New Age (Eddy Lover album) =

Studio album by Eddy Lover
- Released: March 15, 2011
- Genre: Latin pop Reggae; Reggaeton
- Length: 46:36
- Label: Machete Music

Eddy Lover chronology
6 Super Hits (2009)	New Age (2011)	Flow Lover (2015)

Singles from New Age
- 1. "No He Dejado De Extrañarte" Released: 2009; 2. "Me Enamoré" Released: 2010

New Age is the second album by Panamian singer-songwriter Eddy Lover. It was released on March 15, 2011. It included the hits Mas Allá Del Sol and Por Un Beso which were previously released on the EP 6 Super Hits.

== Track listing ==
No.	Title	Length
1.	"Me Enamoré"	4:24
2.	"Solo Sé Quererle"	3:55
3.	"Chica Relax"	4:01
4.	"No He Dejado De Extrañarte"	4:23
5.	"Me Voy Muy Lejos"	3:51
6.	"Mas Allá Del Sol"	3:53
7.	"No Puedo Contestar"	3:56
8.	"Dime"	4:05
9.	"No Vuelvas"	3:17
10.	"Que Se Vaya (Feat. Monthy)"	3:39
11.	"Por Un Beso (Feat. Jr. Ranks)"	3:44
12.	"Amor Bonito"	3:28
