= Chacarron =

- Andy's Val Gourmet on the cover of the CD single

Single by El Chombo featuring Andy's Val Gourmet
- Released: 2005 / December 2006 (UK)
- Recorded: 2003
- Genre: Panamanian reggaetón
- Length: 2:46 (radio edit); 3:00 (re-recorded version); 4:19 (extended version)
- Label: Warner, Substance Records
- Songwriters: Rodney S. Clark; Andres Henry de la Cruz; Wilfred Sanchez
- Producer: Rodney S. Clark

El Chombo singles chronology
"El Gato Volador" (1998)	"Chacarron" (2005)	"Dame Tu Cosita" (2018)

Music video
- "Chacarron Macarron" on YouTube

"Chacarron" (often known as "Chacarron Macarron" or "Shark Around") is a song by Panamanian artists Rodney Clark (El Chombo) and Andres de la Cruz (also known as Andy's Val Gourmet).

It is a reworking of the original version from 2003 by Andy's Val Gourmet, who is credited as 'Andy's Val' on the release. A cover by Yahari appears as the first track of their 2005 album Las + Bailables de .... Yahari.

El Chombo and Andy's Val Gourmet's version reached the top 20 on the UK Singles Chart in December 2006.

The song was included on the compilation Now That's What I Call Music! 65 of the UK series. It was used as walk up music before at bats by José Reyes when he played for the New York Mets, and is also included in the 2021 dance video game Just Dance 2022.

Andy's Val Gourmet died of cardiac arrest on September 11, 2023, as announced on El Chombo's Instagram.

== Composition and lyrics ==
"Chacarron" is a Panamanian reggaeton song which samples "The Breaks" by Kurtis Blow during the bridge sections. The song is known for its mostly unintelligible lyrics.

== Internet popularity ==
The song gained attention online when the chorus was used on a YTMND page by the name of "Ualuealuealeuale" which was created in 2005 by a user named MowtenDoo. It contained a .gif of Batman played by Adam West being drugged in a scene from the 1966 series' first episode. The page also gained popularity on YouTube with a reupload of it gaining millions of views.

"Chacarron Macarron" became a popular viral on the Internet owing to its nonsensical lyrics and odd music video. The lyrics mostly consist of gibberish. The "uale" noise earned de la Cruz (Andy Val) the nickname of "The Mute" ("El Mudo" in Spanish), but due to a mispronunciation, he also earned the nickname of "El Mundo", and the song was subsequently used in numerous viral videos and YouTube poops during the mid-2000s, late 2000s and onward. One particular video involved a loop of Nintendo character Mario headbanging from a Singapore Airlines advertisement. The song was also used as part of the Hurr-Durr JavaScript trojan in 2009.

== Charts ==
Chart (2005–2007)	Peak position
Finland (Suomen virallinen lista)	2
Scottish Singles Sales (Official Charts)	14
Sweden (Sverigetopplistan)	41
UK Singles (Official Charts)	20
