= Papi chulo... (te traigo el mmmm...) =

"Papi chulo... (te traigo el mmmm)"

Single by Lorna
- B-side: "Original version"
- Released: June 2, 2003
- Genre: Reggaeton
- Length: 3:00
- Label: Altra Moda
- Songwriter: Rodney S. Clark Donalds
- Producer: Rodney S. Clark

Lorna singles chronology
"Papi chulo... (te traigo el mmmm)" (2003)	"Papito ven a mí" (2003)

"Papi chulo... (te traigo el mmmm...)" is a song recorded by Panamanian rapper Lorna. Released as her debut single in the summer of 2003, the song achieved huge success in many countries, becoming a top five hit in France, the Netherlands, Belgium and Italy.

== Song information ==
A version of the song was first included on the 2000 compilation Planet Ganja 3, titled "Te Traigo El...".

Sponsored by NRJ, the song also features as a B-side on Lorna's second single from 2003, "Papito ven a mí". In the refrains, the singer can be heard sighing in a sexual manner.

In the music video itself, Lorna performs a suggestive dance while singing.

In France, the single entered the chart at number 46 on July 20, 2003. It climbed quickly and reached the top 10 three weeks later, finally topping the chart for one week. It managed a total of 20 weeks on the chart altogether, 14 of which were in the top 10. It fell off the chart after dropping to number 25, probably because the song was available on the singer's next single which had by then been released. As of August 2014, it was the 59th best-selling single of the 21st century in France, with 364,000 units sold.

The song was also a hit in Pakistan where it was featured in numerous Punjabi stage dramas. Pakistani artist Younis Jani made his own version of the song, which was also a hit in Pakistan.

== Track listings ==
CD single

1. "Papi Chulo... te traigo el mmmm" (radio edit) — 2:58
2. "Papi Chulo... te traigo el mmmm" (original version) — 2:56

CD maxi

1. "Papi Chulo... te traigo el mmmm" (radio edit) — 3:00
2. "Papi Chulo... te traigo el mmmm" (extended edit) — 5:45
3. "Papi Chulo... te traigo el mmmm" (original version) — 3:00

12" maxi

1. "Papi Chulo... te traigo el mmmm"
2. "Papi Chulo... te traigo el mmmm" (jiggy's Latin-afro remix)
3. "Papi Chulo... te traigo el mmmm" (original mix)

== Credits ==
- Licensed from Metropol Records
- Produced by Rodney S. Clark Donalds
- Published by Metropol Music
- Sub-published in France by Scorpio Music (Black Scorpio) Sacem
- P&C 2003 Metropol Records

== Charts and sales ==
=== Weekly charts ===
Chart (2003–2004)	Peak position
Belgian (Flanders) Singles Chart	12
Belgian (Wallonia) Singles Chart	2
Dutch Singles Chart	3
French SNEP Singles Chart	1
Greece Singles (IFPI Greece)	2
Italian Singles Chart	2
Spanish Singles Chart	18
Swedish Singles Chart	49
Swiss Singles Chart	12

=== Year-end charts ===
Chart (2003)	Position
Belgian (Flanders) Singles Chart	67
Belgian (Wallonia) Singles Chart	34
Dutch Top 40	46
French Singles Chart	15
Italian Singles Chart	25
Swiss Singles Chart	41

=== Certifications ===
Region	Certification	Certified units/sales
Belgium (BRMA)	Gold	25,000^{*}
France (SNEP)	Gold	250,000^{*}
^{*} Sales figures based on certification alone.
