= Cutty Ranks =

Jamaican dancehall singer

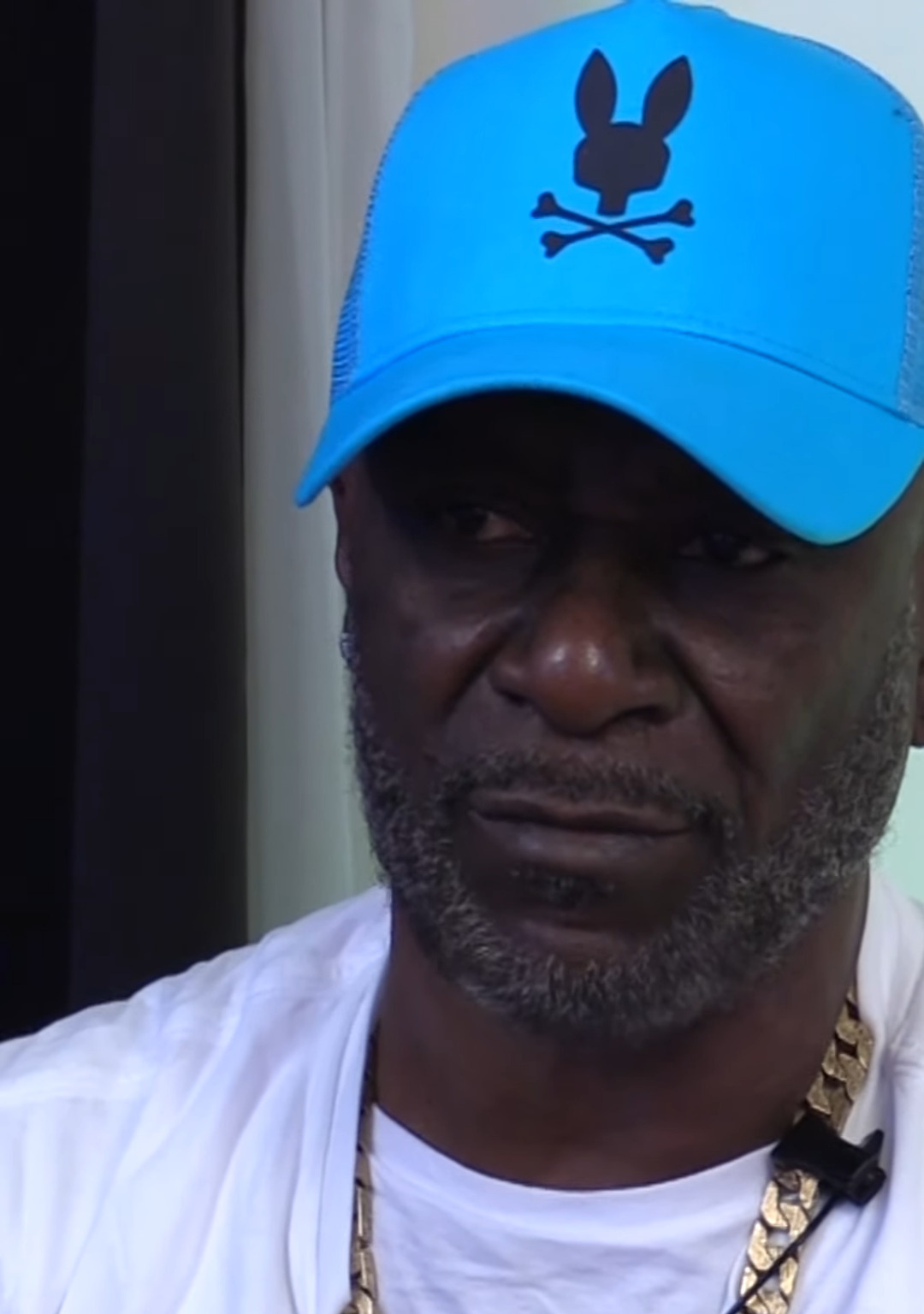
- Cutty Ranks in 2025

Background information
- Born: Philip Thomas; 12 February 1965 (age 61); Clarendon Parish, Jamaica
- Genre: Dancehall
- Occupations: Singer
- Years active: 1986–present
- Labels: Fashion; Penthouse; VP; Shanachie; Philip; Profile

Philip Thomas (born 12 February 1965), better known as Cutty Ranks, is a Jamaican dancehall singer.

== Early life, family and education ==
Thomas was born in Clarendon Parish, Jamaica, in 1965.

As a youth, he was already performing reggae.

== Career ==
Thomas began performing reggae at age eleven with local sound systems. At age 14, he was working with the Gemini sound system before moving on to work with Tony Rebel's Rebel Tone and Papa Roots. Later, he worked with Stereo Mars, Arrows and Metro Media. He joined Killamanjaro where he worked alongside Early B, Super Cat, Puddy Roots, and Little Twitch, and then Sturmars, where he worked with Josey Wales, Nicodemus, Super Cat, U Brown and Yami Bolo. His first job on leaving school was as a butcher.

During the 1980s, Ranks moved on to the Arrows sound system and his 1986 debut single "Gunman Lyrics" was recorded for Winston Riley's Techniques label. He also recorded such tracks as "Out of Hand" and "Fishman Lyrics" with Riley and after spending some time in Miami working with Super Cat and Nicodemus, he worked with Patrick Roberts' Shocking Vibes label, releasing the single "The Bomber". In 1990, he joined Donovan Germain's Penthouse label, enjoying a hit with "Pon Mi Nozzle".

Ranks came to the attention of London-based Fashion Records. In 1991 he released "The Stopper" and a debut album of the same name for Fashion. His follow-up album Lethal Weapon was released the same year for Penthouse, featuring singers such as Marcia Griffiths, Dennis Brown, Wayne Wonder and Beres Hammond. His subsequent albums From Mi Heart and Six Million Ways to Die were released on Priority Records in 1996. Six Million Ways to Die included a hip hop remix of Ranks' song "A Who Seh Me Dun" which was voiced earlier over the Bam Bam riddim in 1992. In 2000, he released the album Back with a Vengeance produced by King Jammy. This album saw Ranks venture into other musical styles, including hip hop and dancehall.

After this, he released music on his own label, Philip Music. He has rejected the 'slackness' of modern dancehall in favour of more 'cultural' concerns. In 2012, he released the album Full Blast, featuring guest appearances from Beres Hammond, Luciano, and Gwen Guthrie. In 2013, he featured on 2 Chainz's "Slums of the Ghetto" and a remix of T.RONE's "Hello Love".

In 2018, his vocals were featured on El Chombo's reggaeton song "Dame Tu Cosita", which was originally released in 1997 in short form on the album Cuentos de la Cripta 2, titled "Introducción B (El Cosita Mix)" which features Ranks' sampled vocals from the track "Kill Them Out". In 2020, he contributed vocals to the Run the Jewels song "Holy Calamafuck" from their album Run the Jewels 4.

== Discography ==
=== Albums ===
- 1991: The Stopper (Fashion) (Profile/Arista/BMG [US])
- 1991: Lethal Weapon (Penthouse)
- 1991: Retreat (VP)
- 1992: From Mi Heart (Shanachie)
- 1996: Six Million Ways to Die (Priority/EMI)
- 2001: Back with a Vengeance (Artists Only!)
- 2005: Hard for It (Wallboomers)
- 2012: Full Blast (Philip Music)

=== Compilations ===
- 2008: Limb By Limb – Reggae Anthology (VP)

=== Collaborations/split albums ===
- 1991: Another One for the Road (Greensleeves) – with Cocoa Tea and Home T
- 1991: Die Hard (Volumes 1 & 2) (Penthouse) – with Tony Rebel
- 1991: 20 Man Dead (Charm) – with Tony Rebel
- 1995: Rumble in the Jungle, Vol. 2 (Fashion) – with Poison Chang
- 2020: "Shiny Collarbone" (Dirty Hit) – with The 1975
- 2020: "Holy Calamafuck" (Jewel Runners) – with Run the Jewels

=== Singles ===
1980s

- 1986: "Gun Man Lyrics"
- 1986: "Greedy Girl"
- 1986: "Christmas Time"
- 1987: "Red Eye Business"
- 1987: "Boom Shot"
- 1989: "Kill Them Out"
- 1989: "Live Up"

1990s

- 1990: "Love Me Have to Get" (with Beres Hammond)
- 1990: "Russia and America"
- 1990: "Gang War" (with Cocoa Tea)
- 1990: "Retreat"
- 1990: "Sound Bwoy Retreat"
- 1990: "The Bommer"
- 1990: "Stick It Up"
- 1990: "The Stopper"
- 1990: "Cool Down"
- 1990: "Big and Rough"
- 1990: "Come Better"
- 1990: "The Loving Boom" (with Barry Boom)
- 1990: "Money Talk"
- 1990: "Business Talk"
- 1991: "Wait on Love" (with Leroy Smart)
- 1991: "Original Ranks"
- 1991: "Lambada" (with Wayne Wonder)
- 1991: "Fi Fe Fi Fo Fum" (with Tiger)
- 1991: "Dominate"
- 1991: "Original Loving" (with Dennis Brown)
- 1991: "The Going Is Rough" (with Home T and Cocoa Tea)
- 1991: "Money Money"
- 1991: "Really Together" (with Marcia Griffiths)
- 1991: "Dance Hall Rock" (with Barrington Levy)
- 1991: "Half Idiot" (with Marcia Griffiths)
- 1991: "One Man Something" (with Tiger)
- 1991: "Gimme Yu Lovin" (with George Banton)
- 1991: "Come with Me" (with Frankie Paul, Trevor Sparks & Yellow Bird)
- 1991: "Another One for the Road" (with Home T and Cocoa Tea)
- 1991: "Grudgeful"
- 1991: "Bring It Back" (with Brian & Tony Gold)
- 1991: "Move Off"
- 1991: "Love Is Not Simple" (with Ken Boothe)
- 1991: "Love Mi Hafi Get"
- 1991: "Move Up"
- 1992: "Roses Are Red"
- 1992: "The System"
- 1992: "A Who Seh Me Dun"
- 1992: "Leave People Man"
- 1992: "Wealth"
- 1992: "Pon Pause"
- 1992: "Living Condition"
- 1992: "Truth & Right"
- 1992: "Disappear"
- 1992: "Legal Thief" (with Sanchez)
- 1992: "Clare" (with Pliers)
- 1992: "Four Big Thief"
- 1993: "Soul Love" (with The Blessing)
- 1993: "Limb By Limb"
- 1993: "Everything Legit"
- 1993: "Home Training"
- 1993: "Rude Boy Rides Again"
- 1993: "As You See It"
- 1994: "Hustle Hustle"
- 1994: "String Dem Up"
- 1994: "Weh Dem a Watch We For" (with General Levy)
- 1994: "Armed and Dangerous"
- 1994: "One Lick Off the Ball"
- 1995: "You Must'n Greedy" (with Barrington Levy)
- 1995: "Bad Police"
- 1995: "The Return"
- 1995: "Looking My Love" (with Barrington Levy)
- 1996: "Punk Fi Go Hide"
- 1996: "Rip and Run Off" (with Cocoa Tea)
- 1996: "My Woman" (with Barrington Levy)
- 1996: "Rude Boy Game"
- 1996: "Detrimental"
- 1996: "Blood on the Corner"
- 1996: "D.J. Line Up"
- 1996: "Bush Tonic"
- 1997: "Get Warm" (with Frankie Paul)
- 1997: "Lyrical War"
- 1997: "Take You Out" (with Cocoa Tea)
- 1998: "Get Away Driver"
- 1998: "Big Machine"
- 1998: "Set You Free" (with Singing Melody)
- 1998: "Me Nah Backdown"
- 1998: "Personal Experience"
- 1998: "Healing of the Nation"
- 1998: "Peace Treaty"
- 1998: "Wuk Dem Hard"
- 1998: "Guiltyness" (with Edi Fitzroy)
- 1998: "No More Will I Roam" (with Dennis Brown)
- 1999: "Come Down"
- 1999: "Bun Dem"
- 1999: "Gal Banger"

2000s

- 2007: "Lucky Day"

2010s

- 2011: "Try Again"
- 2013: "Rebel for Life" (with Naâman)
- 2016: "Man a Lion"
- 2018: "My Town"
- 2018: "Dame Tu Cosita" (with El Chombo)
- 2018: "Dame Tu Cosita" (Remix) (with Pitbull, El Chombo and Karol G)
- 2023: "Genre" (with FreeTheGod)
