= Luna (Eddy Lover song) =

Single by Eddy Lover

from the album Perdóname
- Released: 2008
- Recorded: 2008
- Genre: Latin pop, vallenato, reggaeton
- Length: 4:22
- Songwriter: Eddy Lover

Eddy Lover singles chronology
"Perdóname" (2007)	"Luna" (2008)	"No Debiste Volver" (2009)

"Luna" (Moon) is the first single by Panamanian singer Eddy Lover, released from his debut album Perdóname (2008).

== Charts ==
Chart (2008)	Peak position
U.S. Billboard Hot Latin Tracks	12
U.S. Billboard Latin Tropical Airplay	2

== Accolades ==
=== American Society of Composers, Authors, and Publishers Awards ===
Year	Nominee / work	Award	Result
2009	Luna	Urban Song of the Year	Won
