= Dani Flow =

Mexican rapper (born 1996)

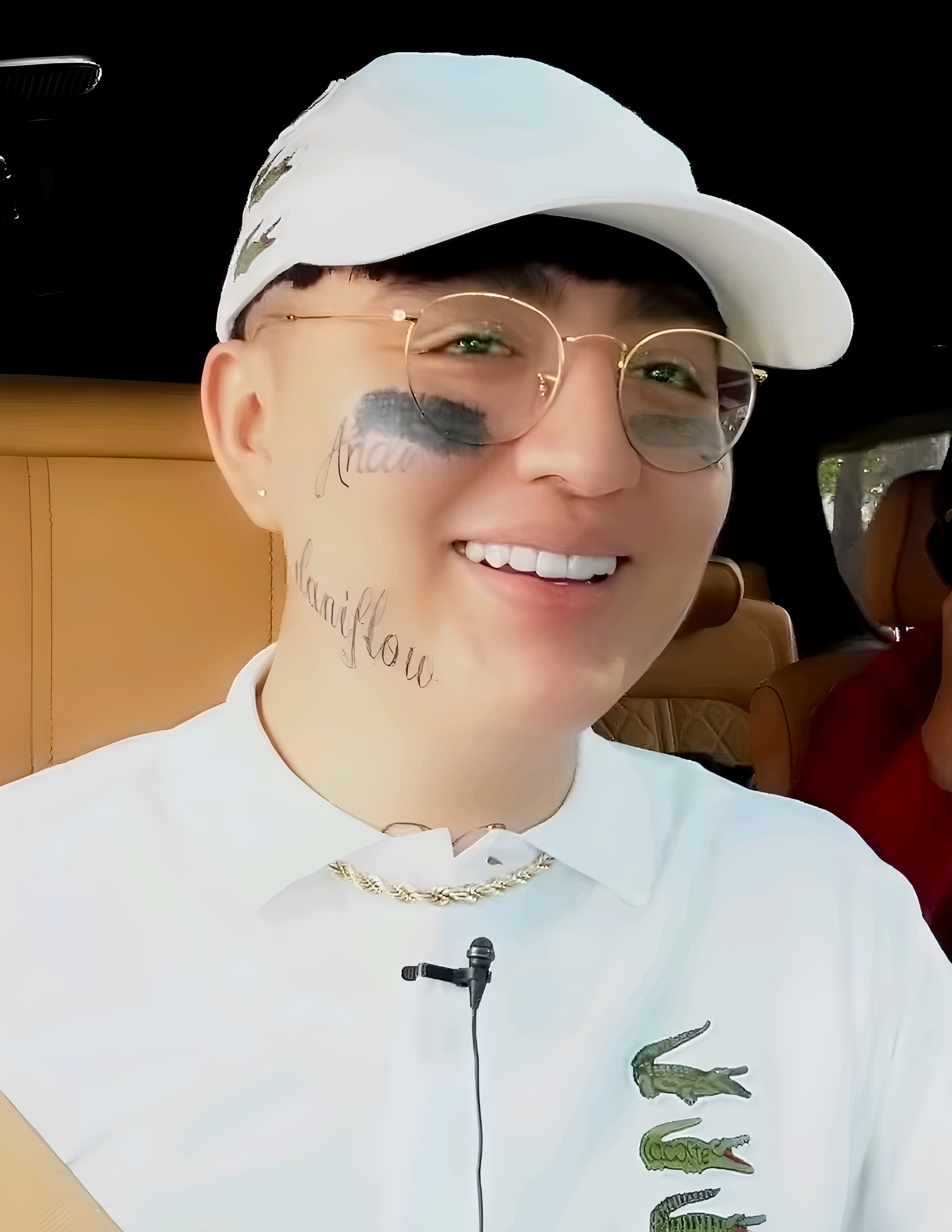

Background information
- Also known as: El Rey del Morbo
- Born: Víctor Daniel Ayala Valladares; 15 January 1996 (age 30); Irapuato, Guanajuato, Mexico
- Genres: Mexa reggaeton
- Occupations: Rapper; singer; songwriter
- Years active: 2010–present
- Spouse: Jocelyne Lino

Víctor Daniel Ayala Valladares (born 15 January 1996), known artistically as Dani Flow, is a Mexican rapper, singer, and songwriter, known for his vulgar, sexual lyrics. His song "Reggeaton Champagne", in collaboration with Bellakath, went viral on social media in 2023.

In 2023 he hosted Flow Fest, and in December of the same year he announced the 'Rey del Morbo Tour' throughout major cities in Mexico.

== Biography ==
His dream has been to become a reggaeton singer since he heard "Baila Morena" by Héctor & Tito in 2004. That same year, he wrote his first song after a trip from Canada away from his family.

He began his career at a young age when at 10 he composed his first work, and at 14 recorded his first single, "Dándote placer".

In 2016, he participated in a competition to become the announcer for C.D. Guadalajara, finishing in 7th place. Despite losing, he continues to act on his passion for the team like in 2020 when he released a song called "Las Chivas" (nickname for C.D. Guadalajara) where he sings of "the strongest comeback since the COVID-19 pandemic". He participated in freestyle battles starting in 2019 but has since left them to focus on reggaeton, signing with Universal Music. In 2020, he collaborated Deny Kotasek, releasing 2 singles, "Doble D" and "Bebecita".

=== Personal life ===
He is married to Jocelyne Lino, with whom is waiting a baby. They were in a polyamorous relationship.

== Discography ==
=== Studio albums ===
List of albums with selected details
Title	Album details
El Rey del Morbo	Released: October 26, 2023; Label: Virgin Music México; Format: Digital download, streaming

=== Singles ===
List of singles as lead artist, with selected chart positions, showing year released, certifications and album name
Title	Year	Peak chart positions		Certifications	Album
Title	Year	MEX	WW	Certifications	Album
"Dándote Placer"	2010	—	—		Non-album singles
"Salvaje"	2017	—	—		Non-album singles
"Lo Más Grande de México"	2017	—	—		Non-album singles
"Gratis"	2019	—	—		Non-album singles
"Doble D" (Deny Kotasek and Dani Flow)	2020	—	—		Non-album singles
"Bebecita" (Deny Kotasek and Dani Flow)	2020	—	—		Non-album singles
"Gracias Por Fallarme"	2020	—	—		Non-album singles
"Te Parto"	2020	—	—		Non-album singles
"Las Chivas" (featuring Cuatro Divango & Bofo Bautista)	2020	—	—		Non-album singles
"25 Años, Calidad"	2021	—	—		Non-album singles
"Vector"	2021	—	—		Non-album singles
"Te Vi"	2021	—	—		Non-album singles
"Ok"	2022	—	—		Non-album singles
"Trépate 2"	2022	—	—		Non-album singles
"Las Que No Tienen Papá"	2023	—	—		Non-album singles
"Ñero Session 5" (Alu Mix, Dani Flow and Tensec)	2023	—	—		Non-album singles
"Tirando Flow Sesh #11" (Dan García, Dani Flow and Uzielito Mix, El Bogueto and Ritorukai)	2023	—	—	AMPROFON: Gold	Non-album singles
"Abre las Patotas"	2023	—	—		Non-album singles
"Otro Show" (Uzielito Mix, El Bogueto and Dani Flow)	2023	—	—		Non-album singles
"Qué Rollito Primavera" (Dani Flow, Alu Mix and Tensec)	2023	—	—		Non-album singles
"Reggaeton Champagne" (Bellakath and Dani Flow)	2023	9	124		Kittyponeo
"Miami"	2023	—	—		Non-album singles
"Martillazo" (Dani Flow, El Bogueto and Uzielito Mix)	2023	—	—		Non-album singles
"Polanco" (Kevin Roldán and Dani Flow featuring Mauro Dembow)	2023	—	—		Non-album singles
"Turbo" (Ovi and Dani Flow)	2023	—	—		Non-album singles
"Ten" (Dani Flow and Uzielito Mix)	2024	—	—		Non-album singles
"Me Vengo en Tu Boca" (Dani Flow and Uzielito Mix)	2024	—	—		Non-album singles
"A Coger" (Osmani García and Dani Flow)	2024	—	—		Non-album singles
"Mamá Mela" (Dani Flow, Uzielito Mix and DJ Rockwel MX)	2024	—	—		Non-album singles
"Devora" (Kevin Santin and Dani Flow)	2024	—	—		Non-album singles
"Un Putero" (Profeta Yao Yao, Dani Flow and Smi-Lee featuring Aguila DS and Gogo Mix)	2024	—	—		Non-album singles
"Putas y Moet" (Dani Flow and Kevin AMF)	2024	—	—		Non-album singles
"Perreando Machín" (Dani Flow and Alu Mix)	2024	—	—		Non-album singles
"Xinga" (Standly and Dani Flow)	2024	—	—		Non-album singles
"Normal" (Dani Flow and Oct8ves)	2024	—	—		Non-album singles
"Plátano" (Millonario and Dani Flow)	2024	—	—		Non-album singles
"El Capitán" (Dani Flow, Kevin Roldán and Uzielito Mix)	2024	—	—		Non-album singles
"Bad Boy" (remix) (Gino Mella, Dani Flow and Lit Killah featuring Juhn, Jairo Vera, Sayian Jimmy, Nysix Music, Cami Music and Montana The Producer)	2024	—	—		Non-album singles
"Domperi" (Dani Flow, Grupo Firme and AXL)	2024	—	—		Non-album singles
"Poliamoroso" (Guaynaa and Dani Flow)	2024	—	—		Non-album singles
"Hula" (Dani Flow, Bellakath and Yexay TMM)	2024	—	—		El Rey del Morbo
"Uy!" (Dani Flow and Go Golden Junk)	2024	—	—		El Rey del Morbo
"Bien Grandes" (Faraón Love Shady and Dani Flow)	2024	—	—		God Phase
"Entiéndeme" (Dani Flow and Dan Soberanis)	2024	—	—		El Rey del Morbo
"—" denotes a recording that did not chart.
