= Nuevas Metas =

Studio album by La Factoría
- Released: December 4, 2006
- Length: 41:38
- Label: Universal Music Latino
- Producer: DJ Greg

La Factoría chronology
Más Allá (2004)	Nuevas Metas (2006)	Demphra (2010)

Alternative cover

Singles from Nuevas Metas
- 1. "Perdóname" Released: 2007

Nuevas Metas (Spanish for "new goals") is the debut studio album by Panamanian group La Factoría. It was released on December 4, 2006, through Universal Music Latino. It contained the hit single "Perdóname".

== Track listing ==
1. "Perdóname" (featuring Eddy Lover) (Mosquera, Vargas) 4:02
2. "Como Me Duele" (Mendoza, Miranda, Vargas) 3:14
3. "Dale" (Romero) 3:44
4. "La Soledad" (Mendoza, Romero) 3:02
5. "Déjame Vivir" (Machore) 3:46
6. "La Pagarás" (Romero) 3:31
7. "Infieles" (Machore, Romero) 3:09
8. "No Pidas Perdón" (Vargas) 3:35
9. "Moriré" (Mosquera) 3:28
10. "Déjalo" (Mendoza, Romero) 3:17
11. "La Noche" (Romero) 2:50
12. "Como Me Duele [Remix]" (Mendoza, Miranda, Vargas) 3:55
13. "Perdóname" (featuring Eddy Lover & Adrian Banton) (Mosquera, Vargas, Colin) 4:02 (Only Digital Download)

== Charts ==
=== Weekly charts ===
Chart (2006–2008)	Peak position
US Heatseekers Albums (Billboard)	22
US Top Latin Albums (Billboard)	20
US Latin Rhythm Albums (Billboard)	3

=== Year-end charts ===
Chart (2008)	Position
US Top Latin Albums (Billboard)	72

== Certifications ==
Region	Certification	Certified units/sales
United States (RIAA)	Gold (Latin)	50,000^{^}
^{^} Shipments figures based on certification alone.
