= Apache Ness =

Panamanian musician (born 1971)

- Born: Ernesto Brown; 6 August 1971 (age 55)
- Origin: Panama
- Genres: Reggae en Español, reggae, dancehall, roots reggae
- Occupation: Singer
- Instruments: Vocals, guitar
- Years active: 1980–present
- Labels: Machete Music, Panama Music

Ernest Brown, better known as The Apache Ness, Apache Ness or Ness and The Sensationals (Ness y Los Sensacionales), is a Panamanian musician of Reggae en Español. He was born in the province of Colon, Republic of Panama, to parents Claudia Brown and Brown Sr.

== History ==
In June 1971, he formed a group called El Colón Sensacional (The sensational Colón), together with his brothers Kely, Lopy and Lele, whose music was of the genre Reggae en Español. Years later, the public began to call them Ness y Los Sensacionales (Ness and The Sensationals), which the group then changed name to. In 1981, Ness recalled his childhood nickname and took the name of Apache Ness. In 1987, an opportunity arose to make a record that would lead him to stardom. Hits included "Come Girl Coco", and "El Alau, El Cubanito". In 1991 after the invasion of Panama, El Apache Ness next to Papa Chan, Kafu Banton, Calito Soul, Wassa Banga, Original Dan, and The Sensational, decided to join and build the foundation One Love One Blood, a group seeking to counter the negative music.

Today the Apache Ness is internationally recognized for his long, stable and successful career, and for being one of the pioneers of Spanish reggae. Along Race and The Sensational Ness have recorded 9 albums in total, the first of these being Living Legend, the most successful which sold 12,000 copies.

== Discography ==
Classic

- "The Hurricane"
- "The Cubanito"
- "Many Calls Cecilia Plata"
- "Wild Rose"
- "Nothing Without You"
- "Nightmare Mix"
- "You Have to Give Hard"
- "In the Mount"
- "After the Monte"
- "I Am Your Love"
- "Santa Lucia"
- "She Does Not Love You" (with Kafu Banton)
- "Mother"
- "Hato Hambo"
- "Cries"
- "Number 4 on my List"
- "The Warning"
- "Ready If"
- "I Love You Truly"
- "Destination"
- "The Dance of the Hip"
- "The Divi Divi"
- "I Love You More Than Anyone"
- "Insurance"
- "The MaliAnta"
- "Pending"
- "Tell Me"
- "Bit"
- "Love Love"
- "My Heart"
- "Phantom Girl"

New

- "She Loves Me"
- "To Be True"
- "Freckles"
- "I Come" (Ivan Barrios feat. Nes)

=== Music videos ===
- "Freckles"
- "Thank You Mother"
- "Your Freedom"
- "The Goldy"

People Insane

- "People in Mind 1"
- "People in Mind 2"
- "People in Mind 3"
- "Pure Legend"

== See also ==
- El General
- Ruben Blades
