= Reynier Casamayor Griñán =

Reynier Casamayor Griñán, known as El Médico (born c. 1975, Santiago de Cuba), is a Cuban musician and medical doctor. He is best known for being a composer and performer of reggaetón music in Cuba and enjoyed some success in Spain with the genre.

He attended the University of Santiago de Cuba in 1993 where he studied medicine and graduated in 2002, specializing in general medicine. El Médico began his musical career interpreting rap with his medical studies and along with two friends, he created the group Garganta de Fuego, or Throat of Fire. He began a new chapter in his music career in 2002 when he recorded a demo with two songs, "El Tarrúo" and "Mi vida, mi amor".

In 2005, he reached No. 8 on the Spanish music charts with the song "Chupa Chupa", released by Warner Music. The song which also charted in Sweden and Belgium, was part of the album Cubaton: Reggaeton a lo Cubano which featured songs from various artists such as Candyman, Mey Vidal, La Familia, Control Cubano and Cubnito 20–20. Though most Cubans easily recognize El Médico's music, the artist himself has not achieved much fame due to his almost non-existent media presence.

In 2011 he was portrayed in the documentary film "El Médico – The Cubatón Story", by the director Daniel Fridell. The film won the Best Documentary category at the New York International Latino Film Festival in 2012. In addition to his music career, he also worked as family doctor in Cuba in the Sierra Maestra mountain region.
