= DJ Medmessiah =

Filipino-Algerian DJ, music producer and rapper

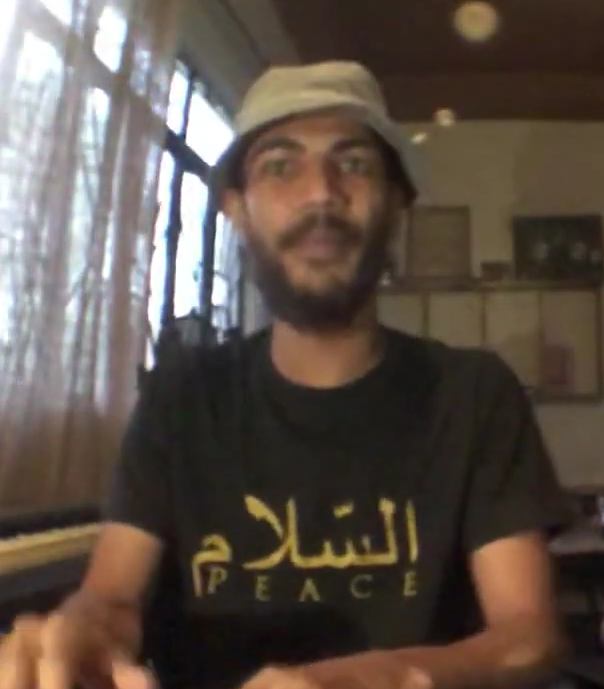
- DJ Medmessiah in 2019

Background information
- Born: Mohammed Bansil; Algeria
- Origin: Pagadian, Zamboanga del Sur, Philippines
- Genres: Hip hop; reggaeton
- Occupations: Disc jockey, record producer, rapper
- Instruments: Vocals, turntables
- Years active: 1990s–present
- Label: Morobeats

Mohammed Bansil, known professionally as DJ Medmessiah, is a Filipino DJ, record producer and rapper. He is the founder of the independent record label and collective Morobeats, which focuses on hip-hop music in the Philippines, particularly from the Mindanao region.

== Early life ==
Bansil was born in Algeria to a Tausug-Maguindanaon father and a Moroccan mother. His family lived in France, where he spent the first three years of his life, before moving to the Muslim district of Maharlika Village in Taguig, Metro Manila. When his father accepted a position as a Shariah court judge, the family settled in Pagadian, Zamboanga del Sur. As a teenager, he played drums in a local band that competed in regional music events. Following the death of his father in 1992, his family relocated to Zamboanga City, where his mother operated a small business selling textiles and merchandise.

== Career ==
=== Early career ===
In the 1990s, Bansil began as a breakdancer before learning turntablism after watching the DMC World DJ Championships. He later moved to Manila, where he became involved in the local hip-hop community.

He was one half of the reggaeton duo Dos Fuertes, together with Clifford Ronquillo. The duo had a hit in 2007 with the song "Tarat-Tat".

=== Morobeats ===
In 2014, Bansil established the record label Morobeats. The collective produces and releases hip-hop music and collaborates with artists from different regions in the Philippines.

In 2024, Morobeats took part in Spotify's KALYE X project with the single "Kendeng". In 2025, Bansil released "Gubat na Siyudad", featuring artists from the Morobeats roster. The track received the Hip-Hop Song of the Year award at the inaugural 2025 Filipino Music Awards. The group also released "Anak Ka ng Pu!", which was performed during Baha sa Luneta and became an anthem expressing frustration over corruption and social issues in the Philippines.

== Musical style ==
Bansil's production style combines elements of hip hop with rhythmic influences from Mindanaoan traditional music, including instruments such as the kulintang. His works often include themes of cultural identity and social commentary.

== Activism ==
Bansil and the Morobeats collective have been noted for incorporating themes of social awareness and advocacy into their music. The group often uses hip hop as a platform to address issues affecting marginalized communities in Mindanao and across the Philippines.

During the group's acceptance speech at the 2025 Filipino Music Awards, Bansil expressed support for humanitarian causes and ended with the message "Free Palestine", drawing attention to the situation in Gaza.

== Personal life ==
To support his young family after getting married, Bansil ran a halal fusion restaurant in Manila.

Bansil has two daughters, known by their stage names Miss A and Fateeha. Both are artists under the Morobeats label and have released songs in collaboration with other members of the collective.

Bansil also has two sisters, Nadjoua and Linda Bansil, who are independent filmmakers. The sisters were kidnapped by the Abu Sayyaf Group on June 22, 2013 in Sulu, and were held captive for eight months before being released in February 2014.

== Legacy ==
Bansil has been cited in media coverage for promoting regional representation in Filipino hip-hop and for supporting artists who perform in local languages.
