= Malianteo =

Music genre of Puerto Rico

- Etymology: From maleante (gangster)
- Other names: Maleanteo
- Stylistic origins: Reggaeton; gangsta rap
- Cultural origins: 1990s, Puerto Rico

Regional scenes
- Puerto Rico • Argentina • Peru • Mexico • Chile

Malianteo or maleanteo is a subgenre of reggaeton music that focuses on criminal activities and the criminal lifestyle.

== Origins and characteristics ==
The term malianteo originates from Puerto Rican youth slang and is derived from the word maleante (gangster). Malianteo originated in Puerto Rico and has been described as a successor to 1990s "underground" reggaeton. The subgenre has spread to other countries such as Peru, Argentina, Mexico, and Chile.

Malianteo sharply contrasts with the party-centered imagery commonly associated with mainstream reggaeton. The instrumentation is characterized by dark, minor notes and heavy dembow rhythms, with gunshots being a common sound effect in songs. Lyrics, which are rapped rather than sung, are explicit and aggressive, referencing weapons, violent incidents, life in impoverished neighborhoods, drugs, and promiscuity.

Malianteo rappers often seek to project a strong and intimidating image. Popular ones include Ñengo Flow, Cosculluela, Zaramay, and YOVNGCHIMI. Some mainstream reggaeton artists use malianteo to indicate they have remained "authentic", having not forgotten their roots and being close to their fans.

== Criticism ==
Malianteo has been criticized as promoting juvenile delinquency, with some music videos featuring young children bearing firearms. In Peru, malianteo artists have frequently been killed. On the other hand, Puerto Rican rapper Residente has said that crime on the island does not result from malianteo songs, but rather from the government's failure to provide accessible quality education.

== See also ==
- Latin trap
- Drill music
- Crime in Puerto Rico
