= Calito Soul =

- Also known as: Calito Soul, "El hombre azul"
- Born: Carlos Lorenzo Miller, Jr. October 29, 1963 (age 62); Colón, Panama
- Genres: Reggae en Español
- Occupation: Singer
- Instrument: Vocals
- Years active: 1977–2015
- Label: Panama Music
- Formerly of: Apache Ness, El General, Ruben Blades

Carlos Lorenzo Miller Junior (29 October 1963) artistically known as Calito Soul is reggae artist from Panama.

== Career ==
Calito’s debut album was El Vacilón Panameño released in 1977.

He was from the group “One Love”, along with Mauricio Denis, releasing songs like “Yo hago todo por ti” (I make anything for you). He was also called “El hombre azul” (The blue man).

== Reports of death ==
In 2015, sources including news site Panamá América reported that Calito, who had long suffered from diabetes, had died. His friend and band member in One Love, Shakkah Banton, reportedly posted on social media in 2019 that he was still alive.
