= Perdóname (La Factoría song) =

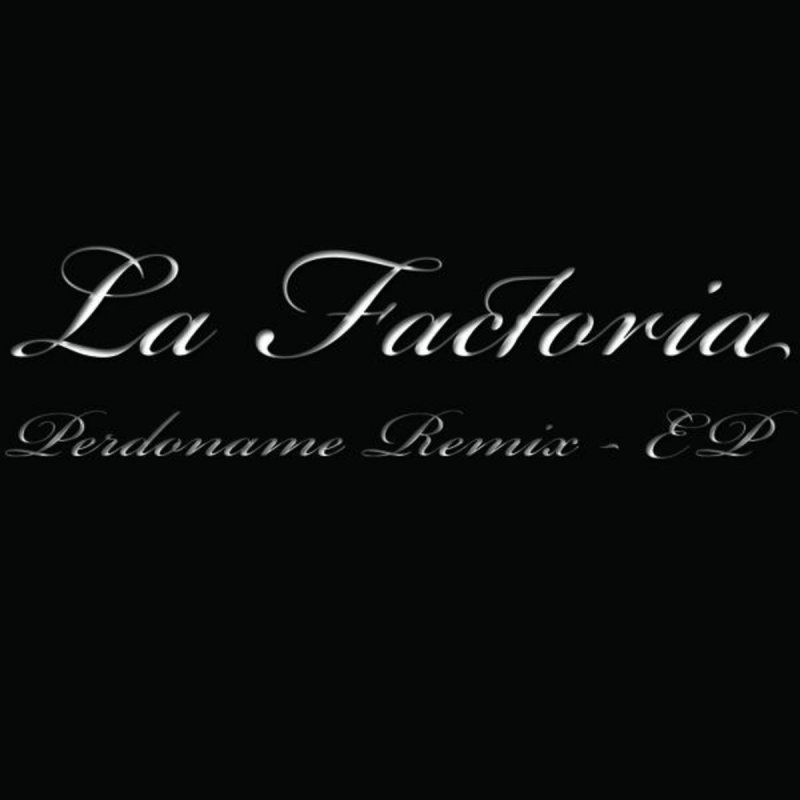

Single by La Factoría featuring Eddy Lover

from the album Nuevas Metas / Perdóname
- Language: Spanish
- English title: "Forgive Me"
- Released: 2007
- Recorded: 2006
- Genre: Reggaeton
- Length: 4:02
- Label: Universal Music Latino
- Songwriters: Aldo Ranks, Eddy Lover

La Factoría singles chronology
"Ese Hombre es Mío" (2004)	"Perdóname" (2007)	"Hay Otro en mi Vida" (2009)

Eddy Lover singles chronology
"Perdóname" (2007)	"Luna" (2008)

"Perdóname" is a song by Panamanian duo La Factoría and singer Eddy Lover, released as a single from La Factoría's debut studio album, Nuevas Metas (2006). A remix of the song features dancehall artist Adrian Banton.

A new version of the song with Puerto Rican singer Farruko was released in October 2023. The track was sampled in American singer Becky G's cumbia single "Otro Capítulo", released in October 2024, alongside her album Encuentros.

== Charts ==
Year	Chart	Peak position	Ref.
2007	US Hot Latin Songs (Billboard)	12	
2008	US Latin Pop Airplay (Billboard)	37	
2008	US Tropical Airplay (Billboard)	26	

== Accolades ==
American Society of Composers, Authors, and Publishers Awards
Year	Nominee / Work	Award	Result	Ref.
2009	"Perdóname"	Urban Song of the Year	Won	
