= Guillermo "Pinky" Mordan =

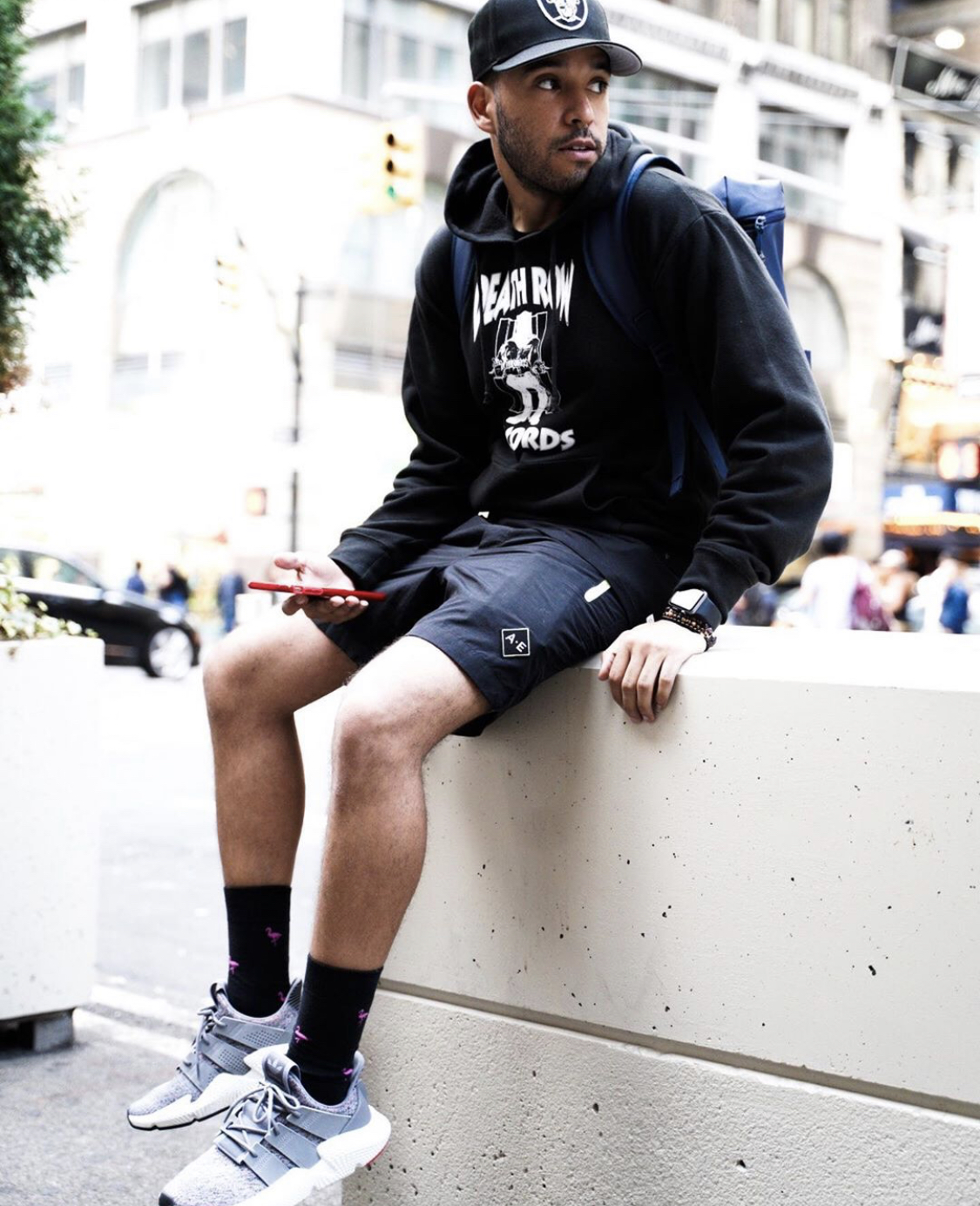

Background information
- Also known as: Pinky
- Born: Guillermo Rafael Mordan; September 4, 1986 (age 40)
- Genres: Reggaeton, Champetón
- Occupations: Record Producer, Songwriter, Music Executive
- Years active: 2006–present
- Labels: Mordan Music Inc., Roc Nation EQ, 300 Entertainment, EMPIRE, Platoon

Guillermo "Pinky" Mordan is a Dominican music producer and executive from Harlem, NY. Pinky started his career with music production at the age of 12 years old. By age 17, he founded his own company Mordan Music Inc. to spotlight the global music scene.

On March 18, 2019, Pinky released No Pienses, the first song under the champetón genre along aside known Colombian artist, Twister El Rey, and John Lajara. No Pienses was well received in Colombia as it ended up in the top 5 for most played songs in Colombia.

== Musical career ==
Under his company Mordan Music, Pinky worked closely with the duo Eddy y Henry. Eddy y Henry’s music premiered on Music Choice. The project played on both major New York Radio stations La Mega and La X, with songs featuring major recording artist Nicky Jam, Fuego and Notch. "Por ti me muero" landed them their first number one record in many cities across Colombia. Voler “Eddy” is currently working on his solo project debuting with his single “Young Julio Iglesias” under Mordan Music inc.

Recording artist John Lajara has landed in top 10 Latin Charts in Colombia under Mordan Music with his single “Nadie Como Tu” featuring Jory Boy showing the capabilities of uniting artist from different nationalities and becoming a success in different parts of the world.

== Production discography & singles ==
| Type | Title | Artist | Year |
|---|---|---|---|
| Album | Timeless | Eddy Y Henry | 2019 |
| Song | No Pienses | Pinky, Twister El Rey & John Lajara | 2019 |
| Song | Vivir Sin Ti | Nicky Jam (featuring Eddy Y Henry) | 2014 |
| Song | Por Ti Me Muero | Eddy Y Henry | 2013 |
