= Nando Boom =

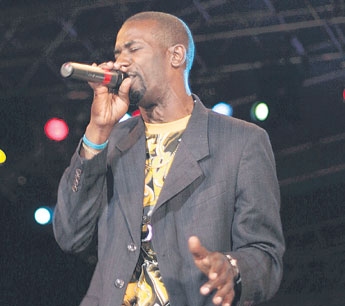

Background information
- Born: Fernando Orlando Brown Mosley; February 14, 1970 (age 56); Panama
- Origin: Panama City, Panama
- Genres: Reggae en Español, raggamuffin, dancehall, ska
- Occupations: Singer, singjay, toaster
- Instrument: Vocals
- Years active: 1977–present

Nando Boom is the stage name for Fernando Orlando Brown Mosley, a reggae en Español artist from Panamá.

Brown began singing in 1977, and "Nando Boom" started in 1985. Nando Boom's new and speedy music style has influenced heavily the evolution of Latin music over the past few years as one of the founding fathers of reggae en Español along with El General. His grinding dance moves have also changed the way people dance since the mid-1990s. This backwards dancing style is now the representative dancing of reggaeton listeners. His most popular songs are "A Danzar" and "Esa Chica Me Vacila", still one of the main songs played in nightclubs all over Latin America.

For many fans and critics he is considered to be a pioneer of reggaeton and one of the most important figures in reggae en Español.

The band received the Caracol of the Caribbean award from Colombia in 1992 and a Stefano award in Miami in 1994.

Nando Boom has released songs with homophobic lyrics, such as the song "No queremos mariflor". He was then criticized by the gay community of Panama.

== Partial discography ==
- Nando Boom (1988)
- Spanish Reggae (1991)
- Nando Boom & the Explotion Band (1992)
- Greatest Hits (1994)
- Back to Work (1996)

== Accolades ==
In 2026 he won his first ever award, after almost 40 years on musical career. In the 38th Premio Lo Nuestro held at the Kaseya Center in Miami, "Mejor Canción Dembow" with Natti Natasha
