= Mey Vidal =

Cuban musician

Mey Vidal (born October 10, 1984) is a Cuban reggae en Español, Dance hall, and reggaeton singer and composer. Born in Palma Soriano, a city in Santiago de Cuba Province, is one of the first to represent the female genre in the reggaeton movement.

== Biography ==
At the age of 5 she starts singing for her family and neighbors. She continues as a singing artist for weddings, dance clubs, school choirs and church choirs.

Mey Vidal has done many duet songs with other artists like CandyMan, El Medico, Daddy Yankee, Trebol Clan, Grupo Mania, Puerto Rico Power, Guanabanas, Oscar D'Leon, Qbanito, Pitbull, and many others.
