= Bellakath =

Mexican singer (born 1997)

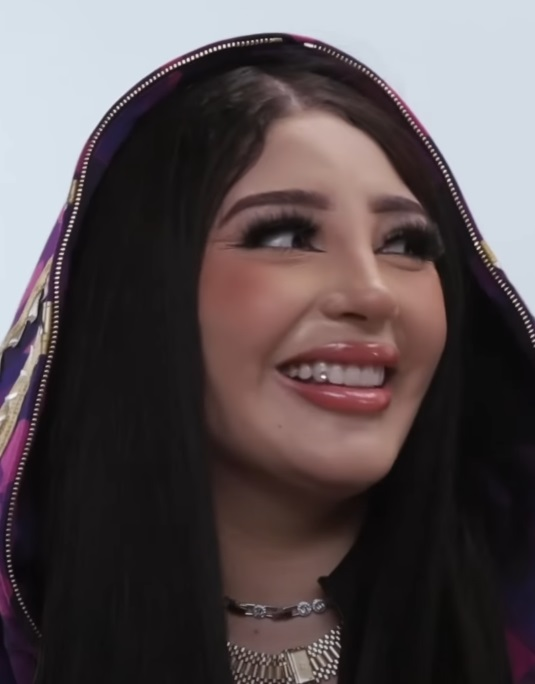
- Bellakath in 2024

Background information
- Born: Katherinne Huerta; October 5, 1997 (age 28)
- Origin: Mexico City, Mexico
- Genres: Alternative reggaeton
- Occupations: Singer; songwriter; record producer
- Years active: 2018–present
- Labels: La Mafia del Perreo; Warner México

Katherinne Huerta (born October 5, 1997), known professionally as Bellakath, is a Mexican singer, songwriter and record producer. She started releasing music in 2020 and went viral after the release of her singles, "Gatita" in 2022 and "Reggaeton Champagne" (with Dani Flow) in 2023. On October 5, 2023, she released her first studio album Kittyponeo.

== Life ==
Huerta grew up in the Agrícola Oriental neighborhood in Iztacalco, Mexico. She attended high school at the Colegio de Ciencias y Humanidades. Huerta graduated with a law degree from National Autonomous University of Mexico.

From 2018 to 2019, Huerta was a contestant on the Mexican version of the dating show Enamorándonos. She subsequently became a social media personality. In 2020, she started her music career with the release of the singles, "La Gata De La Agricola Oriental" and "Lluvia De Micheladas". On December 21, 2022, Huerta released her single titled "Gatita". In March 2023, after it went viral on TikTok, she faced allegations of plagiarism for her song, as users identified similarities to "La Carcacha". Following accusations that she had misappropriated the track from another individual, "Gatita" was removed from several streaming platforms. "Reggeaton Champagne" featuring Dani Flow, was released and went viral in 2023.

In January 2023, she faced backlash from Enamorándonos host Carmen Muñoz for sharing a racist meme about Mexican actresses Yalitza Aparicio and Martha Higareda in 2019.

== Discography ==
=== Studio albums ===
List of albums with selected details
Title	Album details
Kittyponeo	Released: October 5, 2023; Label: La Mafia del Perreo, Warner México; Format: Digital download, streaming
Sata 42	Released: July 15, 2024; Label: La Mafia del Perreo, Warner México; Format: Digital download, streaming

=== Mixtapes ===
List of mixtapes with selected details
Title	Mixtape details
La Reina Del Reggaeton Mexicano - Tomo I: La Chica de las Poesías	Released: October 3, 2024; Label: La Mafia del Perreo, Warner México; Format: Digital download, streaming

=== Extended plays ===
List of extended plays with selected details
Title	EP details
911	Released: April 28, 2021; Label: La Mafia del Perreo; Format: Digital download, streaming

=== Singles ===
==== As lead artist ====
List of singles as lead artist, with selected chart positions, showing year released, certifications and album name
Title	Year	Peak chart positions			Certifications	Album
Title	Year	MEX	US Latin	WW	Certifications	Album
"Melocotón" (with Michael G)	2020	—	—	—		Non-album singles
"Fuckboy" (featuring Jos, Kenia la Menor and DJ Foxy)	2020	—	—	—		Non-album singles
"El Bmw"	2020	—	—	—		Non-album singles
"La Gata de la Agrícola Oriental" (featuring Kery)	2020	—	—	—		Non-album singles
"Mi Adelita" (featuring Kery, Luis Gleez, Matt Vargas, Brayan Morales, DJ Yaso and DJ Foxy)	2020	—	—	—		Non-album singles
"Diabla" (featuring DJ Foxy, Kery, Luis Gleez, DJ Yaso and Brayan Morales)	2020	—	—	—		Non-album singles
"911" (featuring Brayan Morales)	2021	—	—	—		911
"Se Alborota" (featuring Profeta Yao Yao, Alu Mix and DJ Bryan Kingz)	2021	—	—	—		911
"R9 Aleteo" (featuring DJ Yaso)	2021	—	—	—		911
"Fabulosa de París"	2021	—	—	—		Non-album singles
"Lluvia de Micheladas" (featuring Profeta Yao Yao, Riko Mix and Smi-Lee)	2021	—	—	—		Non-album singles
"Me Le Pegué" (featuring Daizak)	2021	—	—	—		Non-album singles
"Flow Soltera" (featuring El Betta, TBX and RD Maravilla)	2021	—	—	—		Non-album singles
"Cupido Malo"	2022	—	—	—		Non-album singles
"BWS" (remix) (featuring Alfa MB, Matt Vargas, DJ Yaso and Alexito Mix)	2022	—	—	—		Non-album singles
"La Abogada"	2022	—	—	—		Non-album singles
"Flow Alta Gama"	2022	—	—	—		Non-album singles
"Cumbiatronik"	2022	—	—	—		Non-album singles
"Gatita"	2022	1	30	—		Kittyponeo
"Sonido Bellakeo"	2022	—	—	—		Non-album singles
"Flow Calle" (featuring Razieel, Alexito Mix and Brayan Morales)	2022	—	—	—		Non-album singles
"Papi, Quiero Perrear"	2023	—	—	—		Non-album singles
"Y Yo Me Le Pego" (with Profeta Yao Yao and Smi-Lee)	2023	—	—	—		Non-album singles
"Clin Clan" (remix) (with Potencia Lirical and El Jincho)	2023	—	—	—		Non-album singles
"Pekorita Love" (with DJ Lester and Alexito Mix)	2023	—	—	—		Kittyponeo
"Tuma"	2023	—	—	—		Kittyponeo
"Reggaeton Champagne" (with Dani Flow)	2023	9	—	124		Kittyponeo
"Gata Gabbana" (with Profeta Yao Yao and Smi-Lee)	2023	—	—	—		Kittyponeo
"Quiero Fumar" (remix) (with Kalé la Evolución)	2023	—	—	—		Kittyponeo
