= Lorna (rapper) =

Panamanian rapper (born 1983)

- Born: Lorna Zarina Aponte; 11 April 1983 (age 43); Panama City, Panama
- Genres: Reggaeton, hip hop
- Occupation: Rapper

Lorna Zarina Aponte (born 11 May 1983), better known simply as Lorna, is a Panamanian rapper. She is best known for her song "Papi chulo... (te traigo el mmmm...)", which was a success in Europe, reaching the top five in France (#1), Italy (#2), Belgium (Wallonia) (#2), Greece (#2), and the Netherlands (#3)and being a big hit in Pakistan.

At the age of 19, Aponte decided that she wanted to become a singer and solo artist and so she went searching for, and found, a music producer and DJ who was willing to record a song.

With help from this producer, she entered a talent competition for new singers organised in Panama City which she won. This gave Aponte the opportunity to record a single. Soon after, she was working with El Chombo, a producer in Panama. In 2005, Aponte was scheduled to appear at a festival in Zorrozaurre, Bilbao, but instead of her, the record company sent one of her backing singers claiming that Lorna had decided to take a sabbatical due to health related issues. The backing singer also gave interviews under the impression of being Aponte.
