= El Chombo =

Panamanian DJ and record producer

- Also known as: El Chombo; Rodney S. Clark
- Born: Rodney Sebastián Clark Donalds; November 27, 1969 (age 56); Panama City, Panama
- Genres: Reggaeton
- Years active: 1995–present
- Labels: Oilers Music, Energy Music Corp., Epic

Rodney Sebastián Clark Donalds (born November 27, 1969), better known by his stage name El Chombo, (Note: In Panama, Chombo refers to a black person but is generally a derogatory term.) is a Panamanian reggaeton record producer. He is best known for the hit songs "El Gato Volador", “Chacarron Macarron" and "Dame Tu Cosita", the latter two becoming viral Internet memes.

== Works ==
His major local hits under his own name include "Kung Fu", "El Gato Volador", "Chacarron Macarron" and "Dame Tu Cosita" (which features Jamaican dancehall musician Cutty Ranks).

As a producer, El Chombo is best known for producing Lorna's 2003 hit single "Papi chulo... (te traigo el mmmm...)", which served as an introduction of reggaeton for many Europeans, reaching number one on the French charts with top ten appearances in Greece, Italy, India, Turkey and the Netherlands. He also released an EP called Macarron Chacarron containing many mixes of his hits.

In 2006, there was a campaign on BBC Radio 1 in the United Kingdom to get the song "Chacarron Macarron" to number one on the UK Singles Chart; in the end, it peaked number 20 on the chart.

In March 2018, "Dame Tu Cosita" became a viral Internet dance challenge and meme.

== Discography ==
=== Albums ===
Spanish Oil series

- Spanish Oil 1 (1995)
- Spanish Oil 2 (1996)
- Spanish Oil 3 (1997)
- Spanish Oil 4 (1998)
- Spanish Oil 5 (1999)
- Spanish Oil Plus (1999)

Cuentos de la Cripta

- Cuentos de la Cripta 1 (1996)
- Cuentos de la Cripta 2 (1997)
- Cuentos de la Cripta 3 (1999)
- Cuentos de la Cripta Remixes (2001)
- Cuentos de la Cripta 4 (2003)
- Cuentos de la Cripta Platinum (2004)

La Mafia series

- La Mafia 1 (1998)
- La Mafia 2 (1999)

El Chombo and Predikador

- El Chombo and Predikador – ReggaeMania Vol. 1 (2003)
- El Chombo and Predikador – Expedientes Vol. 4 (2004)
- El Chombo and Predikador – Criptonita Vol. 2 (2004)
- El Chombo and Predikador – Súper Galleta Vol. 2 (2004)
- El Chombo and Predikador – La Dinastía

Others

- El Chombo featuring Deenovo – Planet Ganja Vol. 1 (1999)
- La Banda (2000)
- El Chombo and DJ Pablito – El Imperio (2000)
- El Chombo and DJ Pablito – El Pentágono 2 (2000)
- Apocalipsis (2002)
- El Chombo and Andy Van Attes – Expedientes 2 (2001)
- El Chombo and Andy Van Attes – Expedientes 3 (2002)
- Super Galleta (2002)
- La Criptonita (2003)
- La Criptonita V3.03 (2007)

=== Singles ===
==== As lead artist ====
Singles as lead artist, showing year released and album name
Title	Year	Peak chart positions								Album
Title	Year	CAN	FIN	FRA	SWE	UK	US	US Latin	ARG	Album
"El Gato Volador"	1999	—	—	—	—	—	—	—	—	Non-album singles
"Chacarron Macarron"	2005	—	2	—	41	20	—	—	—	Non-album singles
"Dame Tu Cosita"	2018	37	—	75	—	—	36	1	—	Cuentos de la Cripta 2
"Dame Tu Cosita" (Remix) (with Pitbull and Karol G)	2018	—	—	—	—	—	—	—	31	Non-album single

==== As producer ====
Singles as producer, showing year released and album name
Title	Year	Peak chart positions								Certifications	Album
Title	Year	BEL (FL)	BEL (WA)	FRA	ITA	NET	SPA	SWE	SWI	Certifications	Album
"Papi chulo... (te traigo el mmmm...)" (performed by Lorna)	2003	12	2	1	2	3	18	49	12	BEL: Gold; FRA: Gold	Non-album single
