= Reggae en Español =

Reggae music recorded in the Spanish language

- Stylistic origins: Reggae, dancehall
- Cultural origins: Panama
- Typical instruments: Drum kit • bass guitar • guitar • electric organ • drum machine • sampler • synthesizer

Fusion genres
- Spanish dancehall

Regional scenes
- Panama, Jamaica

Other topics
- Music of Panama, Music of Jamaica

In Panama, dancehall reggae sung in Spanish language by artists of Latin American origin is known as Reggae en Español (in English, Spanish reggae). It originated in the late 1980s in Panama. Reggae en Español goes by several names; in Panama, it is called "La Plena panameña".

Currently, reggae en Español contains three main subgenres: reggae 110, reggae bultrón, and romantic flow. In addition, and although technically they would not fall into the category of reggae en Español even though it derived from Jamaican dancehall rhythms, reggae en Español also includes two music fusions: Spanish dancehall and reggae soca.

== History ==
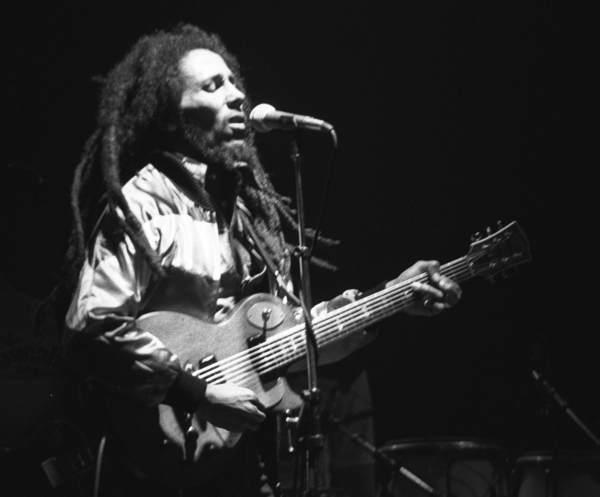
Bob Marley, inspiration for the Reggae en Español.

=== Early developments ===
Reggae as a musical genre has its origins in Jamaica, and it became popular throughout the 1970s in the black-immigrant communities of the other British West Indies, North America, and Great Britain. Jamaican reggae was embraced in Panama by the descendants of black workers that immigrated to the Isthmus during the construction of the Panama Railroad (mid-19th century), the railways for the banana companies (late 19th century), and the Panama Canal (early 20th century). Prior to the period of construction of the Panama Canal (1904–1915), most of the Afro-Caribbean communities in Panama were of Haiti descent, but with the construction of the canal these communities grew in diversity with immigrants from other parts of the Caribbean such as Jamaica, Barbados, Martinique, Guadeloupe, Haiti, Trinidad, Dominica, Puerto Rico, French and British Guyana and other Caribbean Islands.

In 1977, a Guyanese immigrant who went by the nickname "Guyana", along with a local DJ known as "Wassabanga" introduced for first time the reggae rhythms in Panama with lyrics in Spanish. Wassabanga's music along with later interpreters such as Rastanini and Calito Soul, were perhaps the first remarkable cases of reggae en Español, at a time when many Panamanians were already developing a musical and spiritual bond with the Mecca of reggae music (Kingston, Jamaica), a bond catalyzed mainly by the call to arms issued by the music of Bob Marley.

In 1984, Hernando Brin produced the first record in Panamá of reggae in Spanish on vinyl, called "Treatment", composed by Calvin Caldeira (Omega) from Guyana, Hector Watler(Mesias), Erick Green (Gringo), Edgert Robinson (Body) and Hernando Brin (Super Nandi). The record was produced by record label Prodim in Panama, and it included the first song "Padre Por Favor Educa a los Niños" ("Father Please Educate the Children").

In the early to mid-1980s, Panamanians like Renato, El General, Nando Boom, El Maleante and Chicho Man started to take Jamaican dancehall songs and beats, singing over them with Spanish lyrics, most of the time preserving the melodies and the rhythms. They also sped up riddims. This style was called reggae en Español or "Spanish reggae". The music continued to grow throughout the 1980s, with many stars developing in Panama.

Between the 1980s and 1990s, the Panamanian artist Chicho Man emerged as one of the greater exponents of Panamanian reggae. In his short five-year career as an artist, he introduced the "romantic" element in Spanish reggae, and produced only one LP which included songs like "La Noche Que Te Conocí", "Lady in Red", "Llega Navidad", "Muévela", "No Quiero Ir a Isla Coiba" and "Un Nuevo Estilo". His songs were recorded in a warehouse, where a Panamanian producer called Calito LPD produced reggae instrumental tracks and recorded them on cassette. After serving a term in a US prison, he announced his withdrawal from the reggae scene to become a Christian preacher.

In the 1990s, the genre had grown in Panama. In 1991, singer Apache Ness with Papa Chan, Kafu Banton, Calito Soul, Wassa Banga, and Original Dan decided to join forces and create the foundation "One Love One Blood" singing about urban street experiences under the rhythm called reggae bultrón. In 1996 came artists such as Aldo Ranks, El Renegado, and Jam & Suppose who sang the hit "Camión Lleno de Gun". Jr. Ranks and Tony Bull already had good records with late singer Danger Man and they formed the musical group called The Killamanjaros.

Later in Panama, the romanticism had been mixed with reggae and reggae romántico ("romantic reggae"), now better known as "romantic flow". Those who keep alive the reggae with romantic lyrics are the following: Flex (aka Nigga), El Roockie, El Aspirante, Kathy Phillips, Eddy Lover, Tommy Real, Makano, Catherine, as well as groups like Raíces y Cultura and La Factoría who became famous by the Panamanian producer Irving DiBlasio.

In the year 1996, considered the golden age of Panamanian reggae, appeared the productions Los Cuentos de la Cripta and La Mafia by producer El Chombo, with songs like "Las Chicas Quieren Chorizo" ("The Girls Want Chorizo") by Wassabanga, "El Cubo de Leche" by Jam & Suppose and "Estaban Celebrando" by Aldo Ranks.

The Museum of Reggae in Spanish was inaugurated on April 19, 2023. It is located on Calle 13 in the Santa Ana neighborhood of Panama City. This museum was created by Raul Isaac Alvarez who is a fan of the reggae music. The idea behind the museum was to show Panama's contribution as the pioneers of reggae in Spanish and how this country influenced others such as Dominican Republic, Puerto Rico and Central America. The Museum of Reggae in Spanish has recognized the 10 pioneers of the genre including El General, Rude Girl, Renato, Nando Boom, Chicho Man, Carmensita Anderson, Gringo Man, Apache Ness, Super Nandi and Principal.
