= Eddy Lover =

Panamanian musician

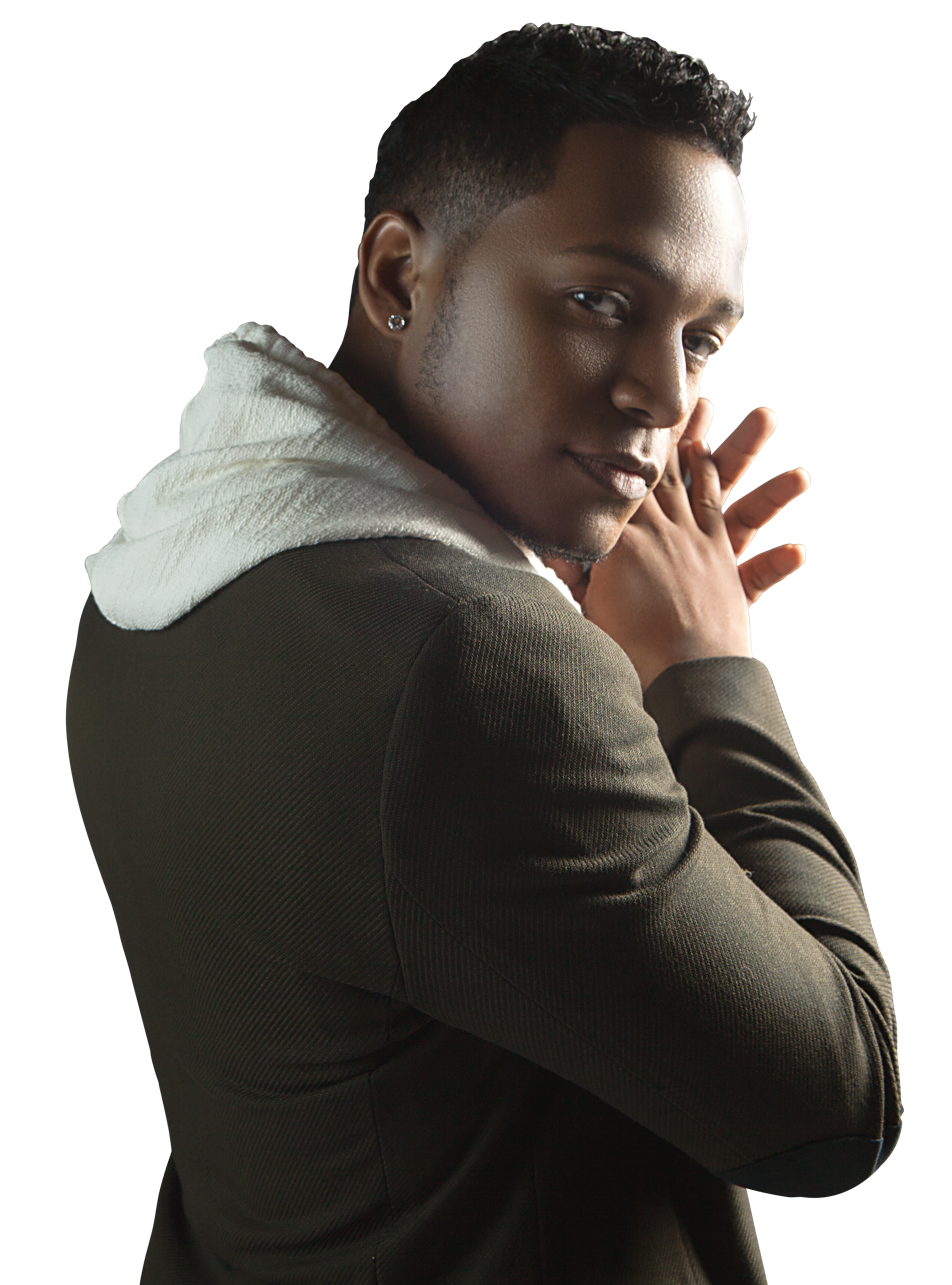
- Eddy Lover in 2016

Background information
- Also known as: El Pequeño de la Banda
- Born: Eduardo Enrique Mosquera Salcedo; 16 March 1985 (age 41); Panama City, Panama
- Genres: Reggaeton, reggae en Español
- Occupations: Singer, songwriter
- Instrument: Vocals
- Years active: 2000–present
- Labels: Panama Music, Machete, Universal, Factory Corp.
- Website: Universal Musica website

Eduardo Mosquera (born 16 March 1985), better known by his stage name Eddy Lover, is a Panamanian reggaeton and Spanish reggae singer and songwriter. Lover rose to international fame with his guest appearance on La Factoría's 2006 smash hit "Perdóname".

== Biography ==
Mosquera was born in Panama City, Panama. He began singing at the age of 12 but it was not until 2000 that he recorded his first song called "Lloro" when he participated in the famous Panamanian mix albums Poison and Las Propias. In 2006, Lover signed a record deal with Panama Music. That same year Eddy Lover recorded Prefiero que te Vayas and Vete. Both songs became huge hits in Panama.

Two years later the artist released his debut album Perdóname. The album included songs like Luna, No Debiste Volver and the smash hit Perdóname. La Factoría gave the artist several awards including a platinum disc. In March 2011, he released his second album New Age. In 2011, he leaves Panama Music to join Factory Corp. and in 2015 under that same label releases his new studio album, Flow Lover.

== Discography ==
Studio albums

- 2008: Perdóname
- 2011: New Age
- 2015: Flow Lover

EPs

- 2009: 6 Super Hits
