= La Factoría =

Panamanian music group

- Origin: Panama City, Panama
- Genres: Reggae en Español, reggaeton
- Years active: 1999–2013
- Labels: Universal, Machete, Castro Music
- Past members: Demphra; Joycee; Joey Montana; Pablo Maestre

La Factoría was a Panamanian group Created by DJ Pablito and led by Marlen Romero, better known by her stage name Demphra but her lead songs are signed as Jossiy love. Initially the group was formed by Romero, Johanna Mendoza (Joysi Love), Edgardo Miranda (MC Joe) and Pablo Maestre (DJ Pablito). The latter three eventually left the group, and Demphra carried on for one more album.

== History ==
In 2001, Demphra joined Panama Music where she released her first solo album, La Willa Demphra. The disc was a complete success in her home country Panama, and including songs like “El Muslo”, “Tilin Tilin”, “Ush”, among others. After the success of this album, MC Joe, Goodfella, Joysi Love and DJ Pablito got together with Demphra, and La Factoría was formed.

The group quickly became a Latin American phenomenon, with hits like “Todavía”, “Que Me Maten”, among others earning La Factoría several awards and a Gold disc for more than 200,000 sales of their first CD in Central and South America. In 2004, La Factoría launched Más Allá, and the songs “No Lastimes Más” and “Ese Hombre es Mío” became huge hits in Latin America.

Two years later, DJ Pablito and MC Joe left the group. That same year La Factoría released Nuevas Metas. The album included smash hits like “Moriré”, “Dale”, “Como Me Duele” and the #1 single “Perdóname” featuring Eddy Lover. "Perdóname" became a huge hit, giving the group several awards including a Platinum Disc for 100,000 digital downloads of the track. In 2009, three years later, Joysi Love left the group. Demphra released a new self-titled album in 2010, under the group's name.

In 2013, Demphra left Panama Music, leaving the La Factoría trademark to the label, now using her stage name.

It was announced that the group would continue with new members.

== Discography ==
=== Studio albums ===
- 2006: Nuevas Metas
- 2009: Demphra

==== Extended plays (EPs) ====
- 2004: Más Allá

==== Compilation albums ====
- 2003: La Factoria

=== Singles ===
List of singles as lead artist, with selected chart positions and certifications, showing year released and album name
Title	Year	Peak chart positions										Certifications	Album
Title	Year	PAN	ARG	CHI	COL	CR	GUA	HON	MEX	SPA	US Latin	Certifications	Album
"Asesina" (feat. Aldo Ranks)	2001												La Factoría
"El Ritmo de la Noche" (feat. Goodfella)	2001												La Factoría
"Todavía"	2002												La Factoría
"Que Me Maten"	2002												La Factoría
"Yo No Voy a Llorar" (new version)	2003												La Factoría
"Ese Hombre Es Mio"	2004												Más Allá
"Perdóname" (feat. Eddy Lover)	2006										12		Nuevas Metas
"Morire"	2007												Nuevas Metas
"Hay Otro en mi Vida"	2009												Demphra
"Dame Una Oportunidad" (feat. Makano)	2009												Demphra
"Vivir Sin Ti"	2009												Demphra
"Amiga"	2009												Demphra
"Que Tonta Fui"	2011												Non-album singles
"No Haces Nah"	2011												Non-album singles
"Así Lo Amo"	2012												Non-album singles
"Dile a Él" (feat. Original Fat)	2013												Non-album singles
"Perdóname" (with Eddy Lover and Farruko)	2023												Non-album singles
