= Reggaeton =

Music genre

- Stylistic origins: Dancehall; dembow; reggae en Español; soca; toasting (Jamaica); hip hop
- Cultural origins: Late 1980s in Panama; Early 1990s in Puerto Rico and Miami
- Typical instruments: Drum machine; synthesizer; sampler; DAW; rapping; vocals

Subgenres
- Alternative reggaeton; cubatón; Dominican dembow; malianteo; neoperreo; pop-reggaetón; romantic reggaetón

Fusion genres
- Bachatón; cumbiatón; moombahton; trapeton

Regional scenes
- Latin America; Puerto Rico; United States; Spain

The scene in the summer of 1995; local duo from Residencial Luis Llorens Torres in San Juan, rapping at a club on the beach in Puerto Nuevo, Vega Baja

Reggaeton (UK: /ˈrɛɡeɪtoʊn, ˌrɛɡeɪˈtɒn/, US: /ˌrɛɡeɪˈtoʊn, ˌreɪɡ-/) is a style of popular dance music that arose from the Spanish reggae of Panama during the late 1980s. It has been popularized and dominated by artists from Puerto Rico since the early 1990s.

It evolved from dancehall, with elements of hip hop, Latin American, and Caribbean music. Vocals include toasting/rapping and singing or rap-singing, typically in Spanish. Reggaeton is regarded as one of the most popular music genres in the Spanish-speaking Caribbean. By the 2010s, the genre had seen increased popularity across Latin America, as well as acceptance within mainstream Western music.

While drawing early stylistic roots from reggae in Spanish and Jamaican dancehall, Puerto Rico served as the cultural and creative backbone of the genre.

== Etymology ==
There are several versions about the origin of the word reggaeton.

The word reggaeton was officially invented and coined in Puerto Rico adding the Spanish suffix ton to the word reggae. One of them states that the word reggaeton emerged in 1994 when Daddy Yankee mentioned it for the first time while "freestyling" on the mixtape Playero 34. Another version suggests that it appeared the following year when DJ Erick released the album titled Reggaetón Live Vol.1, abbreviating the words reggae and maratón (marathon).

The spellings reggaeton and reggaetón are common, although prescriptivist sources such as the Fundéu BBVA and the Academia Puertorriqueña de la Lengua Española recommend the spelling reguetón, as it conforms more closely with traditional Spanish spelling rules.

== History ==
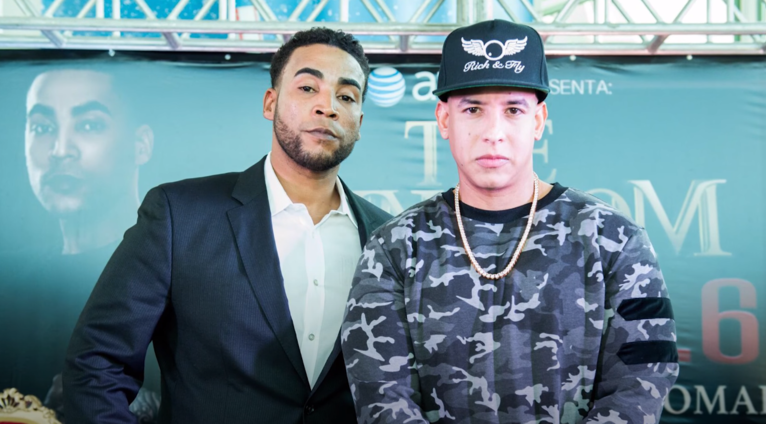
Don Omar (left) and Daddy Yankee (right) are both referred to as the "King of Reggaeton"

=== Afro-diasporic influences ===
There are origins of reggaeton traced to Panama City and Afro-Caribbean canal workers. There was an influx of Jamaican and Barbados immigrants in Panama during this time in order to build the Panama Canal who brought reggae music to Panama. One of the early hits in the reggaeton genre is the song “El D.E.N.I” by Panamanian music artist Renato which communicates discrimination faced by Black Panamanians that spoke English. Later, hip-hop was introduced to Puerto Rico which influenced the development of Spanish rap. After hip-hop and reggae in Spanish syncretized, the music genre “underground” became popularized in Puerto Rico. This links back to the start of Jamaican dancehall music being translated to Spanish in Panama.

=== 1980s–2000s: Emergence ===
Often mistaken for reggae in Spanish, reggaeton is a genre that evolved in Puerto Rico during the early 1990s, heavily building upon the foundation of Jamaican dancehall although its technical evolution, official name, and consolidation as an independent genre took place in Puerto Rico. It had its origins in what was known as "underground rap" music, due to its circulation through informal networks and performances at unofficial venues. DJ Playero and DJ Nelson were inspired by hip hop and dancehall to produce riddims the first reggaeton tracks, which were heavily built upon the original Jamaica Dem Bow riddim created, in Kingston, which established the Puerto Rican underground genre. As Caribbean and African-American music gained momentum in Puerto Rico, reggae rap in Spanish marked the beginning of the Boricua underground and was a creative outlet for many young people. This created an inconspicuous-yet-prominent underground youth culture which sought to express itself. As a youth culture existing on the fringes of society and the law, it has often been criticized. The Puerto Rican police launched a campaign against underground music by confiscating cassette tapes from music stores under penal obscenity codes, levying fines and demonizing rappers in the media. Bootleg recordings and word of mouth became the primary means of distribution for this music until 1998, when it coalesced into modern reggaeton. The genre's popularity increased when it was discovered by international audiences during the early 2000s.

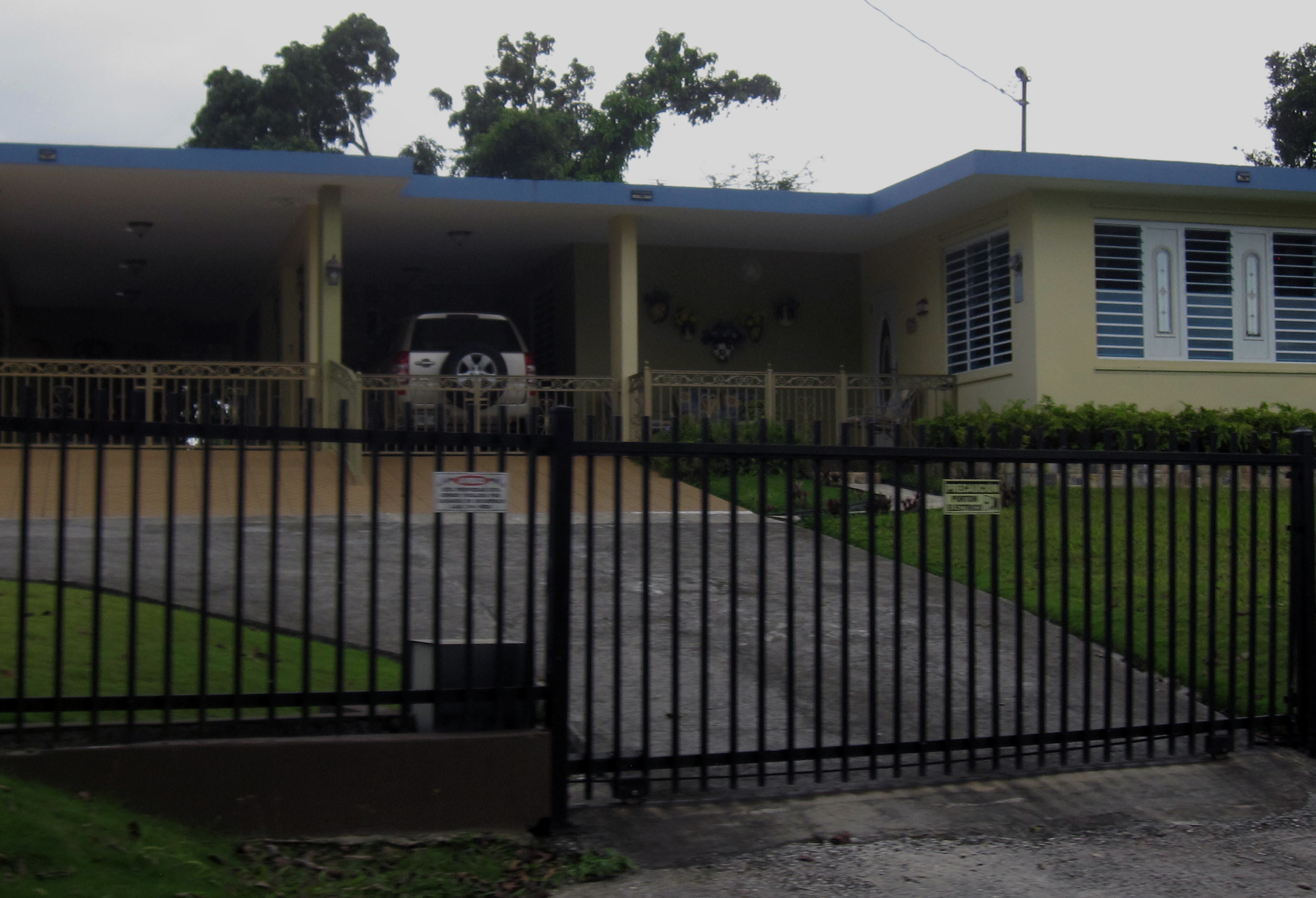
Cassettes were made in carports (marquesinas) and then sold on the street, out of the trunk of a car

The new genre, simply called "underground" and later "perreo", had explicit lyrics about drugs, violence, poverty, friendship, love and sex. These themes, depicting the troubles of inner-city life, can still be found in reggaeton. "Underground" music was recorded in marquesinas (or carports) and at public housing complexes such as Villa Kennedy, and Jurutungo, often by creators using second-hand recording equipment. Despite that, the quality of the cassettes was good enough to help increase their popularity among Puerto Rican youth. The cassettes were sold or distributed on the streets from the trunks of cars. The availability and quality of the cassettes led to reggaeton's popularity, which crossed socioeconomic barriers in the Puerto Rican music scene. The most popular cassettes in the early 1990s were DJ Negro's The Noise I and II and DJ Playero's 37 and 38. Gerardo Cruet, who created the recordings, spread the genre from the marginalized residential areas into other sectors of society, particularly private schools.

By the mid-1990s, "underground" cassettes were being sold in music stores. The genre caught on with middle-class youth, then found its way into the media. By this time, Puerto Rico had several clubs dedicated to the underground scene; Club Rappers in Carolina and PlayMakers in Puerto Nuevo were the most notable. Bobby "Digital" Dixon's "Dem Bow" production was played in clubs. Underground music was not originally intended to be club music. In South Florida, DJ Laz and Hugo Diaz of the Diaz Brothers were popularizing the genre from Palm Beach to Miami.

Underground music in Puerto Rico was harshly criticized. In February 1995, there was a government-sponsored campaign against underground music and its cultural influence. Puerto Rican police raided six record stores in San Juan, hundreds of cassettes were confiscated and fines imposed in accordance with Laws 112 and 117 against obscenity. The Department of Education banned baggy clothing and underground music from schools. For months after the raids local media demonized rappers, calling them "irresponsible corrupters of the public order."

In 1995, DJ Negro released The Noise 3 with a mockup label reading, "Non-explicit lyrics". The album had no cursing until the last song. It was a hit, and underground music continued to seep into the mainstream. Senator Velda González of the Popular Democratic Party and the media continued to view the movement as a social nuisance.

During the mid-1990s, the Puerto Rican police and National Guard confiscated reggaeton tapes and CDs to get "obscene" lyrics out of the hands of consumers. Schools banned hip hop clothing and music to quell reggaeton's influence. In 2002, Senator González led public hearings to regulate the sexual "slackness" of reggaeton lyrics. Although the effort did not seem to negatively affect public opinion about reggaeton, it reflected the unease of the government and the upper social classes with what the music represented. Because of its often sexually charged content and its roots in poor, urban communities, many middle- and upper-class Puerto Ricans found reggaeton threatening, "immoral, as well as artistically deficient, a threat to the social order, apolitical".

Despite the controversy, reggaeton slowly gained acceptance as part of Puerto Rican culture — helped, in part, by politicians including González who began to use reggaeton in election campaigns to appeal to younger voters in 2003. Puerto Rican mainstream acceptance of reggaeton has grown and the genre has become part of popular culture, including a 2006 Pepsi commercial with Daddy Yankee and PepsiCo's choice of Ivy Queen as musical spokesperson for Mountain Dew. Other examples of greater acceptance in Puerto Rico are religiously and educationally influenced lyrics; Reggae School is a rap album produced to teach math skills to children, similar to School House Rock. Reggaeton expanded when other producers, such as DJ Nelson and DJ Eric, followed DJ Playero. During the 1990s, Ivy Queen's 1996 album En Mi Imperio, DJ Playero's Playero 37 (introducing Daddy Yankee) and The Noise: Underground, The Noise 5 and The Noise 6 were popular in Puerto Rico and the Dominican Republic. Don Chezina, Tempo, Eddie Dee, Baby Rasta & Gringo and Lito & Polaco were also popular.

The name "reggaeton" became prominent during the early 2000s, characterized by the dembow beat. It was coined in Puerto Rico to describe a unique fusion of Puerto Rican music. Reggaeton is currently popular throughout Latin America. It increased in popularity with Latino youth in the United States when DJ Joe and DJ Blass worked with Plan B and Sir Speedy on Reggaeton Sex, Sandunguero and Fatal Fantasy.

=== 2004: Crossover ===
In 2004, reggaeton became popular throughout the United States and Europe. Tego Calderón was receiving airplay in the U.S., and the music was popular among youth. Daddy Yankee's El Cangri.com became popular that year in the country, as did Héctor & Tito. Luny Tunes and Noriega's Mas Flow, Yaga & Mackie's Sonando Diferente, Tego Calderón's El Abayarde, Ivy Queen's Diva, Zion & Lennox's Motivando a la Yal and the Desafío compilation were also well received. Rapper N.O.R.E. released a hit single, "Oye Mi Canto". Daddy Yankee released Barrio Fino and a hit single, "Gasolina", opening the door for reggaeton globally. Tego Calderón recorded the singles "Pa' Que Retozen" and "Guasa Guasa". Don Omar was popular, particularly in Europe, with "Pobre Diabla" and "Dale Don Dale". Other popular reggaeton artists include Tony Dize, Angel & Khriz, Nina Sky, Dyland & Lenny, RKM & Ken-Y, Julio Voltio, Calle 13, Héctor el Father, Wisin & Yandel and Tito El Bambino. In late 2004 and early 2005, inspired by the success of "Gasolina", Shakira collaborated with Alejandro Sanz to record "La Tortura" and "La Tortura – Shaketon Remix" for her album, Fijación Oral Vol. 1, further popularizing reggaeton. Four reggaeton songs were sung at the 2005 MTV Video Music Awards: by Don Omar ("Dile"), Tego Calderón, Daddy Yankee, and Shakira with Sanz – the first time any reggaeton song was performed on that stage.

Musicians began to incorporate bachata into reggaeton, with Ivy Queen releasing singles ("Te He Querido, Te He Llorado" and "La Mala") featuring bachata's signature guitar sound, slower, romantic rhythms and emotive singing style. Daddy Yankee's "Lo Que Paso, Paso" and Don Omar's "Dile" are also bachata-influenced. In 2005 producers began to remix existing reggaeton music with bachata, marketing it as bachaton: "bachata, Puerto Rican style".

=== 2006–2017: Topping the charts ===
In May 2006, Don Omar's King of Kings was the highest-ranking reggaeton LP to date on the U.S. charts, debuting atop the Top Latin Albums chart and peaking at number seven on the Billboard 200 chart. Omar's single, "Angelito", topped the Billboard Latin Rhythm Radio Chart. He broke Britney Spears' in-store-appearance sales record at Downtown Disney's Virgin music store.

That same year, Shakira's "Hips Don't Lie", featuring Wyclef Jean of the Fugees, became "the most popular song in the genre's history", with "the dembow beat in the background, the trumpet sample of Jerry Rivera's "Amores como el nuestro" in the chorus, the obvious salsa influence." The song would hit #1 on the Billboard Hot 100, making it the first reggaeton-influenced song to do so.

In June 2007, Daddy Yankee's El Cartel III: The Big Boss set a first-week sales record for a reggaeton album, with 88,000 copies sold. It topped the Top Latin Albums and Top Rap Albums charts, the first reggaeton album to do so on the latter. The album peaked at number nine on the Billboard 200, the second-highest reggaeton album on the mainstream chart.

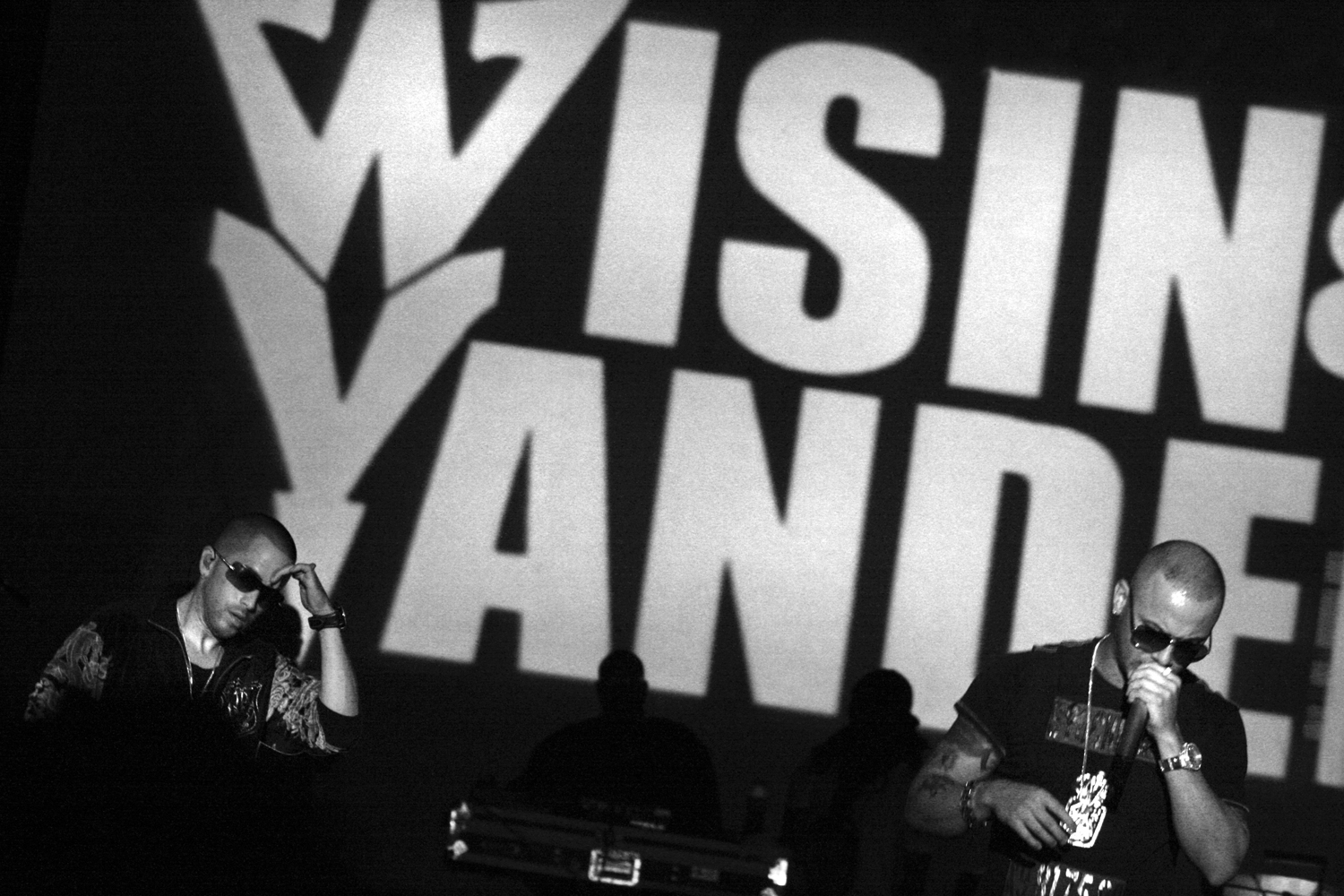
Wisin & Yandel

The third-highest-ranking reggaeton album was Wisin & Yandel's Wisin vs. Yandel: Los Extraterrestres, which debuted at number 14 on the Billboard 200 and number one on the Top Latin Albums chart later in 2007. In 2008 Daddy Yankee soundtrack to his film, Talento de Barrio, debuted at number 13 on the Billboard 200 chart. It peaked at number one on the Top Latin Albums chart, number three on Billboard's Top Soundtracks and number six on the Top Rap Albums chart. In 2009, Wisin & Yandel's La Revolución debuted at number seven on the Billboard 200, number one on the Top Latin Albums and number three on the Top Rap Albums charts.

By 2008, reggaeton was the "biggest-selling genre of Latin music" and one of its artists, Tego Calderon, was using it to describe and encourage black pride.

=== Since 2017: "Despacito" effect ===
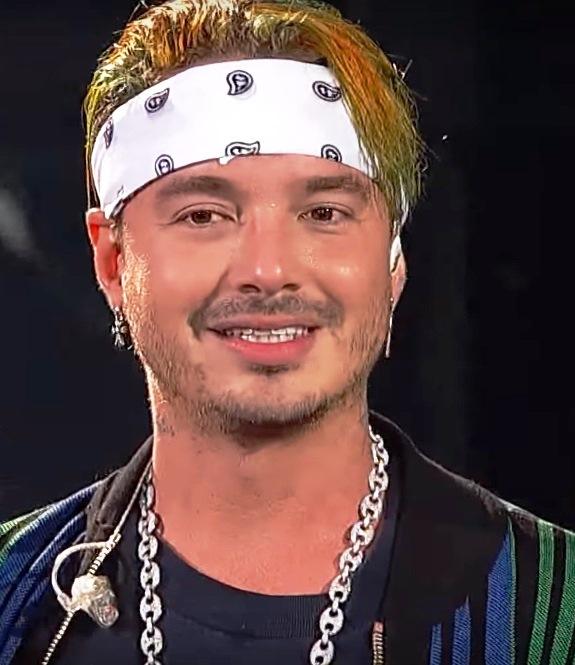
J Balvin in 2017

In 2017, the music video for "Despacito" by Luis Fonsi featuring Daddy Yankee reached one billion views in less than three months. From January 2018 to November 2020, the music video was the most viewed YouTube video of all-time. With its 3.3 million certified sales plus track-equivalent streams, "Despacito" became one of the best-selling Latin singles in the United States. The success of the song and its remix version led Daddy Yankee to become the most listened-to artist worldwide on the streaming service Spotify on 9 July 2017, being the first Latin artist to do so. He later became the fifth most listened-to male artist and the sixth overall of 2017 on Spotify. In June 2017, "Despacito" was cited by Billboard's Leila Cobo as the song that renewed interest in the Latin music market from recording labels in the United States. Julyssa Lopez of The Washington Post stated that the successes of "Despacito" and J Balvin's "Mi Gente" is "the beginning of a new Latin crossover era." Stephanie Ho of Genius website wrote that "the successes of 'Despacito' and 'Mi Gente' could point to the beginning of a successful wave for Spanish-language music in the US." Ho also stated that "as 'Despacito' proves, fans don't need to understand the language in order to enjoy the music", referring to the worldwide success of the song, including various non-Spanish-speaking countries.

==== "Te Boté" and the minimalist dembow ====
In April 2018, "Te Boté" was released by Nio Garcia, Casper Magico, Darell, Ozuna, Bad Bunny and Nicky Jam. It reached number one on the Billboard Hot Latin Songs chart. It currently has over 1.8 billion views on YouTube. Many artists began to mark strong commercial trends in a market dominated by mixing Latin trap and reggaeton followed by a new minimalist dembow rhythm. For example, songs such as "Adictiva" by Daddy Yankee and Anuel AA, "Asesina" by Brytiago and Darell, "Cuando Te Besé" by Becky G and Paulo Londra, "No Te Veo" by Casper Magico and many other songs have been made in this style.

== Characteristics ==
=== Rhythm ===
The dembow riddim was created by Jamaican dancehall producers during the late 1980s and early 1990s. Dembow consists of a kick drum, kickdown drum, palito, snare drum, timbal, timballroll and (sometimes) a high-hat cymbal. Dembow's percussion pattern was influenced by dancehall and other Caribbean music (soca, calypso and cadence); this gives dembow a pan-Caribbean flavor. Steely & Clevie, creators of the "Poco Man Jam" ("Fish Market") riddim, are usually credited with the creation of dembow. At its heart is the 3+3+2 (tresillo) rhythm, complemented by a bass drum in 4/4 time.

"Dem Bow riddim"
Sample of three common variations of the dembow beat; the first beat is "Pounder (Dub Mix II)" by Dennis the Menace, followed by "A Who Seh Me Dun" by Courtney Cole, then lastly the "Fever Pitch" riddim by Bunny Lie Lie and E. Sharman.

"A basic example of reggaeton"
A basic sketch example, 118 bpm key of Am

The riddim was first highlighted by Shabba Ranks in "Dem Bow", from his 1991 album Just Reality. To this day, elements of the song's accompaniment track, as well as the use of "Pounder (Dub Mix II)" by producer Dennis the Menace are found in over 80% of all reggaeton productions. During the mid-1980s, dancehall music was revolutionized by the electronic keyboard and drum machine; subsequently, many dancehall producers used them to create different dancehall riddims. Dembow's role in reggaeton is a basic building block, a skeletal sketch in percussion.

In reggaeton, "dembow" also incorporates identical Jamaican riddims such as "Bam Bam", "Hot This Year", "Poco Man Jam", "Fever Pitch", "Red Alert", "Trailer Reloaded" and "Big Up", and several samples are often used. Some reggaeton hits incorporate a lighter, electrified version of the riddim. Examples are "Pa' Que la Pases Bien" and "Quiero Bailar", which use the "Liquid" riddim. Since 2018, a new variation of the dembow rhythm emerged; starting with "Te Boté", a sharper minimalist dembow has become a stable of reggaeton production which has allowed for more syncopated rhythmic experiments.

=== Lyrics and themes ===
Reggaeton lyrical structure resembles that of hip hop. Although most reggaeton artists recite their lyrics rapping rather than singing, many alternate rapping and singing. Reggaeton uses traditional verse-chorus-bridge hip hop structure. Like hip hop, reggaeton songs have a hook which is repeated throughout the song. Latino ethnic identity is a common musical, lyrical and visual theme.

Unlike hip-hop CDs, reggaeton discs generally do not have parental advisories. An exception is Daddy Yankee's Barrio Fino en Directo (Barrio Fino Live), whose live material (and with Snoop Dogg in "Gangsta Zone") were labeled explicit. Snoop Dogg and Daddy Yankee filmed the video for "Gangsta Zone" in Torres Sabana housing projects in Carolina, Puerto Rico on January 27, 2006. Shot in grayscale, Daddy Yankee said the video depicts "the real way we live on the island".

Artists such as Alexis & Fido circumvent radio and television censorship by sexual innuendo and lyrics with double meanings. Some songs have raised concerns about their depiction of women. Although reggaeton began as a mostly-male genre, the number of women artists has been a slowly increasing and include the "Queen of Reggaeton", Ivy Queen, Mey Vidal, K-Narias, Adassa, La Sista and Glory.

While reggaeton is commonly associated with themes of violence, misogyny, and sex, researchers uncover that there also commentaries to the political state in Latin America within the genre. There are several artists that speak on issues such as racism and inequalities faced by the Afro-Latino communities. Many of these artists have produced works that combine afro-diasporic elements alongside Spanish rap lyrics.

For instance, the popularized artist Tego Calderón heavily emphasizes his Afro-Puerto Rican identity throughout his discography. His works discuss the discrimination faced by Afro-Latinos despite the “racial democracy” established in Puerto Rico. Through this, reggaeton serves as an expressive genre and a commercial one.

== Dance ==
Sandungueo, or perreo, is a dance associated with reggaeton which emerged during the early 1990s in Puerto Rico. It focuses on grinding, with one partner facing the back of the other (usually male behind female). Another way of describing this dance is "back-to-front", where the woman presses her rear into the pelvis of her partner to create sexual stimulation. Since traditional couple dancing is face-to-face (such as square dancing and the waltz), reggaeton dancing initially shocked observers with its sensuality but was featured in several music videos. It is also known as daggering, grinding or juking in the English-speaking areas of the U.S.

Perreo was most popularized in Black urban neighborhoods, especially within the clubbing scene during the 1990s. The hip-movements and fluid nature of the dance have roots in the expressive culture of Afro-Caribbean dance. The dance is an evolved form of Jamaican Dancehall and it similarly expresses sexuality and resistance to Western ideals. The dance received criticism due to its sexual nature, arguing that reggaeton lyrics and dance forms have led to moral decay in Latin American societies. Researchers claim that these criticisms are rooted in fear of attention to Black bodies and cultural expressions in a loud and performative way.

== Popularity ==
=== Latin America ===
Since the 2000s, reggaeton has received mainstream recognition in the Spanish-speaking Caribbean, where the genre originated from, including Puerto Rico, Cuba, Panama, the Dominican Republic, Colombia and Venezuela, where it is now regarded as one of the most popular music genres. Reggaeton has also seen increased popularity in the wider Latin America region, including in Mexico, Honduras, Guatemala, Nicaragua, Costa Rica, El Salvador, Argentina, Chile, Uruguay, Ecuador and Peru. In 2022, Bad Bunny's album Un Verano Sin Ti became the second all-Spanish language album to top the Billboard 200 and obtained nominations at the Grammy Awards.

In Cuba, reggaeton came to incorporate elements of traditional Cuban music, leading to the hybrid Cubaton. Two bands credited with popularizing Cubaton are Máxima Alerta (founded in 1999) and Cubanito 20.02. The former is notable for fusing Cubaton with other genres, such as son Cubano, conga, cumbia, salsa, merengue, and Cuban rumba, as well as styles and forms such as rap and ballads, whereas the latter's music is influenced more by Jamaican music. The government of Cuba imposed restrictions on reggaeton in public places in 2012. In March 2019, the government went a step further; they banned the "aggressive, sexually explicit and obscene messages of reggaeton" from radio and television, as well as performances by street musicians.

Reggaeton first became known in Brazil after the group Señores Cafetões released the track "Piriguete" in 2007, which at the time was mistaken by Brazilians for hip hop and Brazilian funk because reggaeton was still a genre almost unknown in the country. The genre only reached reasonable popularity in Brazil around the mid-2010s. The first great success of the genre in the country was the song "Yes or No" by Anitta with Maluma. One of the reasons for reggaeton not reaching the same level of popularity that exists in other Latin American countries is due to the fact that Brazil is a Portuguese-speaking country, which has historically led it to become more isolationist than other Latin American countries in the music scene. The musical rhythm only became popular in the country when it reached other markets, like the American market. The genre is now overcoming the obstacle of language. Some of the biggest names in the Brazilian music market have partnered with artists from other Latin American countries and explored the rhythm.

=== United States ===
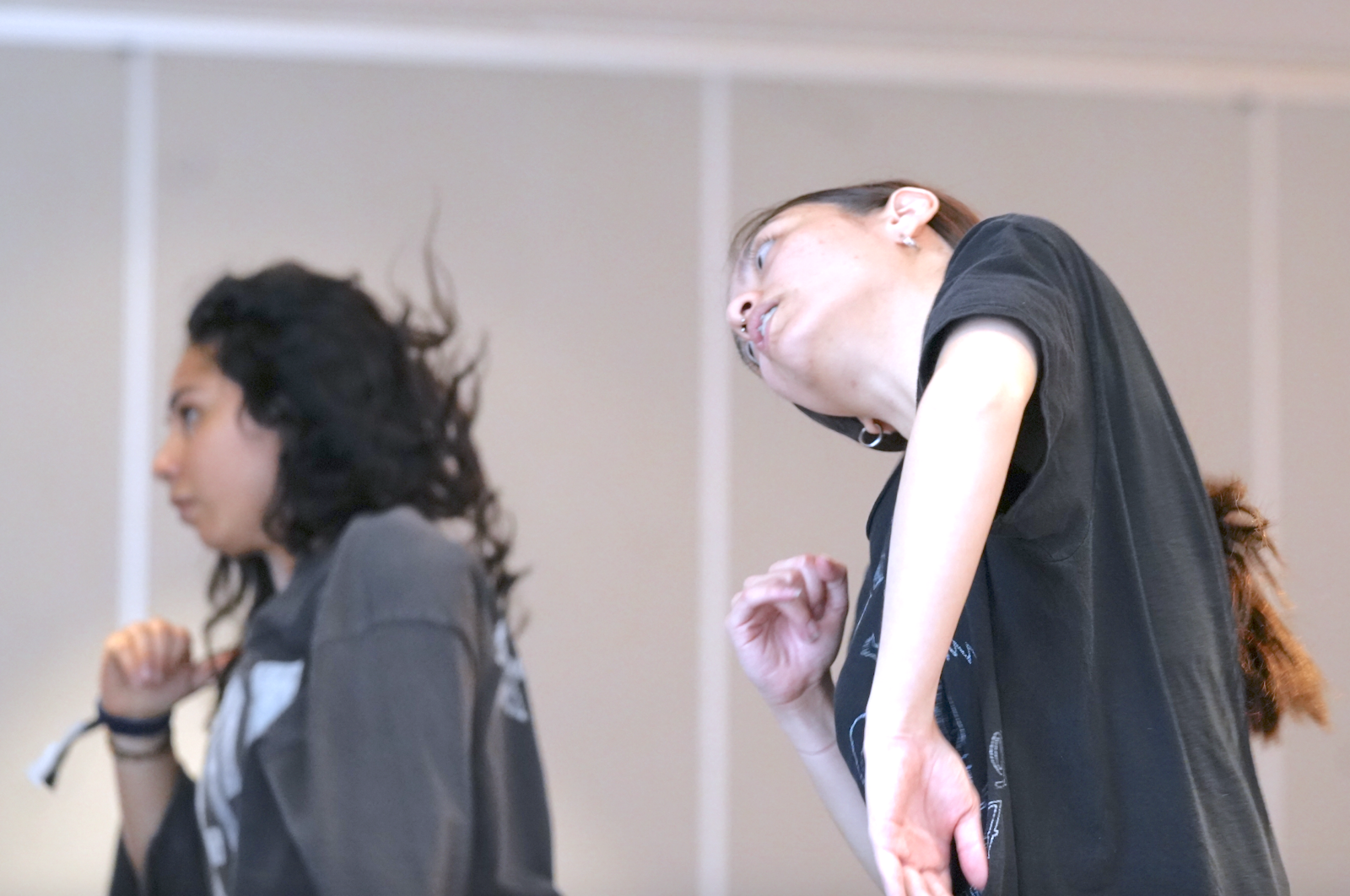
Hip hop/reggaeton performance at the California Dance Festival, 2025

The New York–based rapper N.O.R.E., also known as Noreaga, produced Nina Sky's 2004 hit "Oye Mi Canto", which featured Tego Calderón and Daddy Yankee, and reggaeton became popular in the U.S. Daddy Yankee then caught the attention of many hip-hop artists with his song "Gasolina", and that year XM Radio introduced its reggaeton channel, Fuego (XM). Although XM Radio removed the channel in December 2007 from home and car receivers, it can still be streamed from the XM Satellite Radio website. Reggaeton is the foundation of a Latin-American commercial-radio term, hurban, a combination of "Hispanic" and "urban" used to evoke the musical influences of hip hop and Latin American music. Reggaeton, which evolved from dancehall and reggae, and with influences from hip hop has helped Latin-Americans contribute to urban American culture and keep many aspects of their Hispanic heritage. The music relates to American socioeconomic issues, including gender and race, in common with hip hop.

=== Europe ===
As in Latin America, reggaeton is a fairly widespread genre within Spain. For years it has topped the list as the most listened to musical genre in the Iberian country. Reggaeton arrived in Spain due to the large immigration flows of the 2000s and today it is a genre that is quite integrated into Spanish society, which also has its own exponents of the genre such as Enrique Iglesias, Rosalía, Ana Mena, Lola Índigo and Juan Magán. In the rest of Europe, Reggaeton is less popular in Europe than in Latin America, however it attracts Latin American immigrants. A Spanish media custom, "La Canción del Verano" ("The Song of the Summer"), in which one or two songs define the season's mood, was the basis of the popularity of reggaeton songs such as "Baila Morena" by Héctor & Tito and Daddy Yankee's "Gasolina" in 2005.

=== Asia ===
In the Philippines, reggaeton artists primarily use the Filipino language instead of Spanish or English. One example of a popular local reggaeton act is Zamboangueño duo Dos Fuertes, who had a dance hit in 2007 with "Tarat Tat", and who primarily uses the Chavacano language in their songs.

In 2020, Malaysian rapper Namewee released the single and music video "China Reggaeton" featuring Anthony Wong. It is the first time reggaeton was sung in the Chinese languages of Mandarin and Hakka and accompanied by traditional Chinese instruments like the erhu, pipa and guzheng, creating a fusion of reggaeton and traditional Chinese musical styles.

== LGBTQ influence ==
Reggaeton has traditionally been male dominated and heteronormative, known to "reinforce the most unpleasant aspects of machismo". The genre began to accept queer and trans artists into the mainstream after Bad Bunny publicly voiced his allyship to the queer community through challenging gender norms and homophobic notions. New generation artists like Villano Antillano, Young Miko, La Cruz and others have been challenging the stereotypes and values traditionally associated with the genre.

In 2022 Villano Antillano, a trans-femme rap/reggaeton artist from Puerto Rico, broke the record as "the first transwoman to hit number 50 on Spotify" with Villano Antillano: Bzrp Music Sessions, Vol. 51 in collaboration with producer Bizarrap. She began her music career as a male-presenting person under the artist name "Villano Antillano" and later decided to "step into [her] femininity" and transition. She has since kept her original artist name, but identifies as non-binary and is referred to as her legal name "Villana". Villana has spoken on her experience confronting the barriers for queer and trans people in the reggaeton and urban industry; she says, "all of these cis male artists, who are very close, aren't going to collaborate with a trans woman. There are very few. We can count them on one hand."

In 2023 Young Miko, a queer trap and reggaeton artist from Puerto Rico, charted on the Billboard Hot 100 with her single "Classy 101". In the same year, she was featured on Spanish rapper Bad Gyal's "Chulo Pt2", along with Tokischa, a queer Dembow singer; as of October 2023, the song has over 100 million views on YouTube. In the start of her career, Young Miko grew a local following in Puerto Rico releasing music independently on SoundCloud, but gained national visibility after Bad Bunny invited her on stage during his Un Verano Sin Ti tour.

In June 2023, reggaeton artist La Cruz from Venezuela released a music video for his single "TE CONOCI BAILANDO", which featured several homoerotic images including several shirtless men, locker room interactions and guys twerking in front of urinals. He challenged what is expected from traditional reggaeton music visuals by having gay men be the object of desire rather than women. The music video has amounted 2 million views on YouTube as of October 2023.

== Criticism ==
Despite the popularity of the genre, reggaeton has also attracted criticism due to its constant references to sexual and violent themes, similar to those of hip-hop. Mexican singer-songwriter Aleks Syntek made a public post on social media complaining that such music was played at Mexico City's airport in the morning with children present. By 2019, other singers who expressed dismay over the genre included vallenato singer Carlos Vives and Heroes Del Silencio singer Enrique Bunbury. That same year, some activists stated that reggaeton music gives way to misogynistic and sadistic messages.

Some reggaeton singers have decided to counteract such accusations. One notable example is singer Flex, who in 2009 committed himself to singing songs with romance messages, a subgenre he dubbed "romantic style".

== Lawsuit ==
The Steely estate and Clevie (Steely died in 2009) sued Universal Music Group and Warner Chappell Music in 2019 for approximately 1,800 reggaeton tracks that allegedly infringed the "Fish Market" (a.k.a. "Poco Man Jam") riddim which was the basis for the "Dem Bow" riddim that they created in 1989.

== See also ==
- List of reggaeton musicians
- Reggae en Español
- Panamanian reggaetón
- Dancehall
- Calypso
- Soca
- Latino poetry
- Nuyorican
- Kwaito
