= Premios Oye! 2008 =

7th Gala Premios Oye!
- Date: November 26, 2008
- Location: Foro Monumental, Zacatecas, Zacatecas
- Hosted by: Jaqueline Bracamontes and Jorge Poza

Television/radio coverage
- Network: Televisa

The seventh Premios Oye! took place at the Foro Monumental in Zacatecas, Zacatecas on November 26, 2008. The nominees were announced on September 29 with Vicente Fernández receiving 5 nominations, followed by Julieta Venegas and Juanes with 4 each one, with 3 each one, Amandititita and Ximena Sariñana. Miguel Bosé will be awarded by the Academia Nacional de la Música en México for his 31 years or career. The voting process is certified by PricewaterhouseCoopers.

== Performers ==
- Nigga — Te Quiero / Escápate
- Playa Limbo — El Tiempo De Tí
- Belanova — One, Two, Three, Go! (1, 2, 3, Go!)
- Vicente Fernández — La Penca Del Maguey / Para Siempre / Estos Celos / Acá Entre Nos / Mujeres Divinas
- Margarita "La Diosa De La Cumbia" — Si Tienes Otro Amor
- Ha*Ash — No Te Quiero Nada
- Miguel Bosé — Morenamía
- Yuridia — En Su Lugar
- Pablo Montero with los niños de la casa hogar de Zacatecas — Piquito De Oro
- La Arrolladora Banda El Limón — Y Que Quede Claro

== General Field ==
=== Album of the Year ===
- (Mexico) Fuerza — Alejandra Guzmán
  - Loris Ceroni, producer.
- (Mexico) Fantasía Pop — Belanova
  - Cachorro López & Belanova, producers.
- (Colombia) La Vida Es Un Ratico — Juanes
  - Gustavo Santaolalla & Juanes, producers.
- (Mexico) Julieta Venegas MTV Unplugged — Julieta Venegas
  - Julieta Venegas & Jaques Morelenbaum, producers.
- (Spain) Papitour — Miguel Bosé
  - Pete Walsh & Miguel Bosé, producers.

=== Record of the Year ===
- (Mexico) "Metrosexual" — Amanda Escalante, songwriter (Amandititita)
- (Mexico) "Cinco Minutos" - Erika Ender & Amerika, songwriters (Gloria Trevi)
- (Colombia) "Me Enamora" — Juan Esteban Aristazábal, songwriter (Juanes)
- (Mexico) "El Presente" - Julieta Venegas, songwriter (Julieta Venegas)
- (Panama) "Te Quiero" — Félix Gómez, songwriter (Nigga)

=== Best New Artist ===
- (Mexico) Amandititita — Amandititita
- (Puerto Rico) Cualquier Día — Kany García
- (Panama) Te Quiero — Nigga
- (Mexico) Canciones De Hotel — Playa Limbo
- (Mexico) Mediocre — Ximena Sariñana

== Pop Field ==
=== Best Male Pop ===
- (Mexico) Retro — Emmanuel
- (Colombia) La Vida Es Un Ratico — Juanes
- (Mexico) Cómplices — Luis Miguel
- (Spain) Papitour — Miguel Bosé
- (Panama) Te Quiero — Nigga

=== Best Female Pop ===
- (Mexico) Fuerza — Alejandra Guzmán
- (Mexico) Amandititita — Amandititita
- (Mexico) Una Rosa Blu — Gloria Trevi
- (Puerto Rico) Cualquier Día — Kany García
- (Mexico) Entre Mariposas — Yuridia

=== Best Pop by a Duo/Group ===
- (Mexico) Fantasía Pop — Belanova
- (Chile) Nadha — Kudai
- (Mexico) Canciones De Hotel — Playa Limbo
- (Mexico) Empezar Desde Cero — RBD
- (Mexico) Hasta Ahora — Sin Bandera

== Rock Field ==
=== Best Rock by a Duo/Group or Solo ===
- (Mexico) Sino — Café Tacuba
- (Mexico) Julieta Venegas MTV Unplugged — Julieta Venegas
- (Mexico) Arde El Cielo — Maná
- (Mexico) 17 — Motel
- (Mexico) Mediocre — Ximena Sariñana

== English Field ==
=== Album of the Year ===
- (United States) As I Am — Alicia Keys
  - Alicia Keys & Kerry Brothers, Jr., producers.
- (France) Psychédélices — Alizée
  - Alizée, producer.
- (United Kingdom) Back To Black — Amy Winehouse
  - Mark Ronson & Salaam Remi, producers.
- (United Kingdom) Viva La Vida — Coldplay
  - Markus Dravs, Brian Eno, Jon Hopkins & Rik Simpson, producers.
- (United States) Hard Candy — Madonna
  - Madonna, producer.

=== Record of the Year ===
- (United States) "No One" — Alicia Keys, Kerry Brothers, Jr. & George D. Harry, songwriters (Alicia Keys)
- (United Kingdom) "You Know I'm No Good" - Amy Winehouse, songwriter (Amy Winehouse)
- (United Kingdom) "Viva La Vida" - Guy Berryman, Jonny Buckland, Will Champion & Chris Martin, songwriters (Coldplay)
- (United States) "S.O.S." - Nick Jonas, songwriter (Jonas Brothers)
- (United States) "4 Minutes" - Madonna, Timbaland, Justin Timberlake & Nathaniel Hills, songwriters (Madonna featuring Justin Timberlake)

=== Best New Artist ===
- (United Kingdom) Rockferry — Duffy
- (United States) Jonas Brothers — Jonas Brothers
- (United States) Dreaming Out Loud — OneRepublic
- (United States) Riot! — Paramore
- (United Kingdom) One Chance — Paul Potts

== Popular Field ==
=== Album of the Year ===
- (Mexico) Que Bonito Es Lo Bonito — Banda el Recodo
  - Fonovisa Records & María de Jesús Lizárraga, producers.
- (United States) 2C — Intocable
  - Chuy Flores, producer.
- (Mexico) Y Que Quede Claro — La Arrolladora Banda El Limón
  - Disa Records, producer.
- (Mexico) 100% Mexicano — Pepe Aguilar
  - Pepe Aguilar & Chuy Flores, producers.
- (Mexico) Para Siempre — Vicente Fernández
  - Joan Sebastian, producer.

=== Record of the Year ===
- (United States) "Tu Adiós No Mata" — Oswaldo Villareal, songwriter (Intocable)
- (Mexico) "Sobre Mis Pies" - Isidro Chávez, songwriter (La Arrolladora Banda El Limón)
- (Mexico) "Amiga Por Favor" — Gilberto Gless, songwriter (Pedro Fernández)
- (Mexico) "Para Siempre" — Joan Sebastian, songwriter (Vicente Fernández)
- (Mexico) "Estos Celos" — Joan Sebastian, songwriter (Vicente Fernández)

=== Best New Artist ===
- (Mexico) Tiraré A Matar — Banda La Bufadora
- (Mexico) Pensando En Tí — Germán Montero
- (Mexico) Josel Y Raúl — Josel Y Raúl
- (Mexico) Llegando A Tí — Los Herederos De Nuevo León
- (United States) El Regreso De Los Reyes — Cruz Martínez presenta Los Super Reyes

=== Best Norteño by a Duo/Group or Solo ===
- (Mexico) Que Ganas De Volver — Conjunto Primavera
- (United States) 2C — Intocable
- (Mexico) Raíces — Los Tigres del Norte
- (Mexico) Mi Tesoro Norteño — Pablo Montero
- (Mexico) Corridos: Defendiendo El Honor — Pesado

=== Best Grupero by a Duo/Group or Solo ===
- (Mexico) Más Broncos Que Nunca — El Gigante De América
- (Mexico) Buena Suerte — La Firma
- (Mexico) Así Somos — LMT
- (Mexico) Recuerdos del Alma — Los Temerarios
- (Mexico) Una Noche en Madrid — Marco Antonio Solís

=== Best Ranchero by a Duo/Group or Solo ===
- (Mexico) A Puro Dolor — Nadia
- (Mexico) Las Mujeres Mandan — Paquita la del Barrio
- (Mexico) Dime Mi Amor — Pedro Fernández
- (Mexico) 100% Mexicano — Pepe Aguilar
- (Mexico) Para Siempre — Vicente Fernández

=== Best Banda/Duranguense by a Duo/Group or Solo ===
- (Mexico) El Avion De Las Tres — AK-7
- (Mexico) Que Bonito Es Lo Bonito — Banda el Recodo
- (Mexico) No Es De Madera — Joan Sebastian
- (Mexico) Y Que Quede Claro — La Arrolladora Banda El Limón
- (Mexico) Ayer, Hoy Y Siempre — Los Horóscopos de Durango

=== Best Tropical by a Duo/Group or Solo ===
- (United States) Planeta Kumbia — A.B. Quintanilla presenta Kumbia All Starz
- (Puerto Rico) Caribe Gardel — Jerry Rivera
- (United States) El Regreso De Los Reyes — Cruz Martínez presenta Los Super Reyes
- (Colombia) Tentaciones — Margarita "La Diosa de la Cumbia"
- (Puerto Rico) Exitos en 2 Tiempos — Olga Tañón

== Video of the Year Field ==
=== Video in Spanish ===
- (Mexico) Cada Que... — Belanova
  - Ángel Flores, video director; Ángel Flores, video producer
- (Mexico) Ésta Vez — Café Tacuba
  - Nosotros, video director; Nosotros, video producer
- (Colombia) Me Enamora — Juanes
  - Aggressive, video director; JP Fox, video producer
- (Mexico) El Presente — Julieta Venegas
  - Milton Lage, video director; Milton Lage, video producer
- (Mexico) Vida Paralelas — Ximena Sariñana
  - Pablo Dávila, video director

== Theme from a Telenovela, Movie or Television Series ==
=== Theme of the year in Spanish ===
- (Mexico) "No Se Me Hace Fácil" — Gian Marco, songwriter (Alejandro Fernández)
  - Juan Osorio, producer (Tormenta en el paraíso)
- (Colombia) "Alma De Hierro" — Juan Fernando Fonseca, songwriters (Fonseca)
  - Roberto Gómez Fernández, producer (Alma De Hierro)
- (Mexico) "Esto Es Lo Que Soy" — Jesse Huerta & Joy Huerta, songwriters (Jesse & Joy)
  - Rosy Ocampo, producer (Las Tontas No Van al Cielo)
- (Colombia) "Hay Amores" - Shakira Mebarak, songwriter (Shakira)
  - Scott Steindorff, producers (Love in the Time of Cholera)
- (Mexico) "Para Siempre" — Joan Sebastian, songwriter (Vicente Fernández)
  - Salvador Mejía, producer (Fuego en la sangre)

== Best Song with a Message ==
- (Chile) Lejos De Aquí — Kudai

== Tribute to the artistic ==
- (Spain) Miguel Bosé

== Audience Award ==
- (Mexico) Pepe Aguilar
