= Necesito de Ti (Vicente Fernández song) =

"Necesito de ti"

Single by Vicente Fernández

from the album Necesito de Ti
- Released: May 5, 2009
- Genre: Mariachi
- Length: 3:13
- Label: Norte
- Songwriter: Manuel Toscano
- Producer: Manuel Cázares

Vicente Fernández singles chronology
"El Último Beso" (2008)	"Necesito de ti" (2009)

"Necesito de ti" ("I Need You") is a song written by Manuel Toscano, produced by Manuel Cázares, and performed by Mexican singer Vicente Fernández. It was released worldwide on May 5, 2009 as the first single from Fernández' 81st album, released on July 7, 2009.

== Background ==
Vicente Fernández, the biggest ranchera music performer, picked May 5, 2009, a very special date for Mexican history, since it is the Anniversary of the Battle of Puebla, to release his new single, "Necesito de Ti". After the success of his 79th studio album Para Siempre, which led to a Latin Grammy Award for Best Ranchero Album and three top ten hits in the Billboard Hot Latin Tracks chart ("Estos Celos", "La Derrota" and "Para Siempre"), and the release of his live album Primera Fila, which included his first number-one hit in the Latin charts in United States, "El Último Beso", Fernández recorded his new album, tentatively named Necesito de Ti, under the production of Manuel Cázares. This single is a ranchera ballad, written by Manuel Toscano, a Latin Grammy Award nominee in 2001 for his song "Piérdeme el Respeto" performed by Paquita la del Barrio. Toscano has written songs for several singers and groups, including El Chapo de Sinaloa, Rayito Colombiano, Alejandro Fernández, Ana Gabriel, Ramón Ayala, Lucía Méndez, Grupo Pesado, Jenni Rivera and Los Tigres del Norte. It is not the first time that Toscano and Fernández work together. Fernández previously recorded songs written by Toscano, including "El Ayudante", "La Casa Chica", "La Peor de Mis Locuras", "La Tienda", "Los Grandes Amantes", "Se Pelearon Nuestras Mentes", "Señora de Mis Respetos" and "Sublime Mujer". With "Necesito de Ti", Fernández celebrates 44 years of singing career.

== Chart performance ==
The song debuted on the Billboard Latin Regional Mexican Airplay chart in the chart dated on June 20, 2009 at number 30, peaking at number 16. In the Hot Latin Tracks chart, the song debuted at number 45 and peaked at number 27.

Chart (2009)	Peak position
U.S. Billboard Hot Latin Songs	27
U.S. Billboard Latin Regional Mexican Airplay	16

== Personnel ==
The following people contributed to the song "Necesito de Ti".

- Vicente Fernández - lead vocals
- Manuel Cázares - producer
- Gustavo Borner - mixer
