= Para Siempre (disambiguation) =

Para Siempre is a 2007 album by Vicente Fernández.

Para Siempre may also refer to:

- "Para Siempre" (Daddy Yankee song), 2022
- "Para Siempre" (Vicente Fernández song), 2008

== See also ==
- Parasiempre, 1996 album by Héroes del Silencio
