= Juan Flores =

Juan Flores may refer to:

== Academics ==
- Juan de Flores (c. 1455–c. 1525), Spanish courtier, diplomat and author
- Juan Flores (professor) (1943–2014), American professor of social and cultural analysis

== Politics ==
- Juan José Flores (1800–1864), Venezuelan president and military general
- Juan Alcocer Flores (born 1955), Mexican politician
- Juan Gerardo Flores Ramírez (born 1968), Mexican politician

== Sportspeople ==
- Juan Flores (1930s footballer), Peruvian football forward
- Juan Flores (wrestler) (born 1940), Mexican Olympic wrestler
- Juan Flores (footballer, born 1964), Honduran football forward
- Juan Flores (footballer, born 1976), Peruvian goalkeeper
- Juan Flores (soccer, born 1997), American soccer forward
- Juan Flores (baseball) (born 2006), Venezuelan baseball player

== Other ==
- Juan Flores (outlaw) (c. 1834–1857), Californio bandit
- Juan Carlos Flores (1962–2016), Cuban poet
