= List of winners of Premios Oye! =

The winners of Premios Oye! from 2002 to 2013

== 2002 ==
- Main Spanish Record of the Year: Sin Bandera, Sin Bandera
- Main Spanish Song of the Year: A Dios le Pido, Juanes
- Main Spanish Breakthrough of the Year: Sin Bandera, Sin Bandera
- Latin Pop Male: MTV Unplugged, Alejandro Sanz
- Latin Pop Female: Laundry Service, Shakira
- Latin Pop Group: Sin Bandera, Sin Bandera
- Latin Rock Soloist or Group: Elefante, Elefante
- Main English Male: Lenny, Lenny Kravitz
- Main English Female: Laundry Service, Shakira
- Main English Group: Tie between Rock Steady, No Doubt & World Of Our Own, Westlife
- Popular Norteño Soloist or Group: Sueños, Intocable
- Popular Grupero Soloist or Group: Los Tucanes de Tijuana
- Popular Banda Soloist or Group: Contigo por Siempre, Banda el Recodo
- Popular Tropical Soloist or Group: Grandes Éxitos, Chocolate
- Special Tribute to Trajectory: José José
- Premio Social a la Música: Maná

Special Awards

- International Artist of the Century: Paul McCartney
- International Trajectory in Mexico: Bon Jovi
- Pepsi Oye 2002 Award: Paulina Rubio

== 2003 ==
- Main Spanish Record of the Year: Revolución De Amor, Maná
- Main Spanish Song of the Year: Caraluna, Bacilos
- Main Spanish Breakthrough of the Year: Yahir, Yahir
- Latin Pop Male: Corazón Latino, David Bisbal
- Latin Pop Female: Frágil, Ana Torroja
- Latin Pop Group: Caraluna, Bacilos
- Latin Rock Soloist or Group: Revolución De Amor, Maná
- Main English Record of the Year: A Rush of Blood to the Head, Coldplay
- Main English Song of the Year: The Game Of Love, Santana & Michelle Branch
- Main English Male: Escapology, Robbie Williams
- Main English Female: Let Go, Avril Lavigne
- Main English Group: A Rush of Blood to the Head, Coldplay
- Main English Breakthrough of the Year: Let Go, Avril Lavigne
- Popular Record of the Year: Con Orgullo por Herencia, Pepe Aguilar
- Popular Song of the Year: Niña Amada Mía, Alejandro Fernández
- Popular Breakthrough of the Year: Nadia, Nadia
- Popular Norteño Soloist or Group: Nuestro Destino Estaba Escrito, Intocable
- Popular Grupero Soloist or Group: -, Marco Antonio Solís
- Popular Ranchero Soloist or Group: Niña Amada Mía, Alejandro Fernández
- Popular Banda/Duranguense Soloist or Group: -, Banda el Recodo
- Popular Tropical Soloist or Group: -, Margarita "La Diosa de la Cumbia"
- Special Tribute to Trajectory: Los Tigres del Norte
- Premio Social a la Música: Benny Ibarra

== 2004 ==
- Main Spanish Record of the Year: Sí, Julieta Venegas
- Main Spanish Song of the Year: Andar Conmigo, Julieta Venegas
- Main Spanish Breakthrough of the Year: Aerosoul, Kalimba
- Latin Pop Male: 111 Ciento Once, Tiziano Ferro
- Latin Pop Female: Belinda, Belinda
- Latin Pop Group: De Viaje, Sin Bandera
- Latin Rock Soloist or Group: Sí, Julieta Venegas
- Infantil Spanish Soloist or Group: Alegrijes y Rebujos, Alegrijes y Rebujos
- Main English Record of the Year: Under My Skin, Avril Lavigne
- Main English Song of the Year: This Love, Maroon 5
- Main English Breakthrough of the Year: Songs About Jane, Maroon 5
- Popular Record of the Year: Con Orgullo por Herencia, Pepe Aguilar
- Popular Song of the Year: Mesa Que Más Aplauda, Climax
- Popular Breakthrough of the Year: Victor García, Víctor García
- Popular Norteño Soloist or Group: Nuestro Destino Estaba Escrito, Intocable
- Popular Grupero Soloist or Group: Que Amarren a Cupido, Joan Sebastian
- Popular Ranchero Soloist or Group: Con Orgullo por Herencia, Pepe Aguilar
- Popular Banda/Duranguense Soloist or Group: Hay Amor, Banda el Recodo
- Popular Tropical Soloist or Group: Za Za Za, Climax
- Video of the Year: Duele el Amor, Aleks Syntek & Ana Torroja
- Special Tribute to Trajectory: Antonio Aguilar
- Premio Social a la Música: Claudio Yarto

== 2005 ==
- Main Spanish Record of the Year: A Corazón Abierto, Alejandro Fernández
- Main Spanish Song of the Year: Tie between Muriendo Lento, Moderatto & Belinda and La Camisa Negra, Juanes
- Main Spanish Breakthrough of the Year: Rebelde, RBD
- Latin Pop Male: A Corazón Abierto, Alejandro Fernández
- Latin Pop Female: Fijación Oral Vol. 1, Shakira
- Latin Pop Group: Rebelde, RBD
- Latin Rock Soloist or Group: Detector de Metal, Moderatto
- Infantil Spanish Soloist or Group: Código F.A.M.A. 3, Código F.A.M.A.
- Main English Record of the Year: X&Y, Coldplay
- Main English Song of the Year: Radio, Robbie Williams
- Main English Breakthrough of the Year: Love. Angel. Music. Baby., Gwen Stefani
- Popular Record of the Year: Hay Amor, Banda el Recodo
- Popular Song of the Year: Na Na Na (Dulce Niña), A.B. Quintanilla & Kumbia Kings
- Popular Breakthrough of the Year: Si No Existieras, Banda Los Recoditos
- Popular Norteño Soloist or Group: X (10), Intocable
- Popular Grupero Soloist or Group: Razón de Sobra, Marco Antonio Solís
- Popular Ranchero Soloist or Group: México En La Piel, Luis Miguel
- Popular Banda/Duranguense Soloist or Group: Hay Amor, Banda el Recodo
- Popular Tropical Soloist or Group: Fuego, A.B. Quintanilla & Kumbia Kings
- Video of the Year: Na Na Na (Dulce Niña), A.B. Quintanilla & Kumbia Kings
- Special Tribute to Trajectory: Banda el Recodo and Rocío Dúrcal
- Premio Social a la Música: Juanes

Special Awards

- New values for music: Belanova, Reik and Lu

== 2006 ==
- Main Spanish Record of the Year: Indeleble, Alejandra Guzmán
- Main Spanish Song of the Year: Hips Don't Lie(Spanish version), Shakira
- Main Spanish Breakthrough of the Year: Motel, Motel
- Latin Pop Male: México - Madrid: En Directo Y Sin Escalas, Alejandro Fernández
- Latin Pop Female: Indeleble, Alejandra Guzmán
- Latin Pop Group: Mundos Opuestos, Ha*Ash
- Latin Rock Soloist or Group: Motel, Motel
- Reggaeton Soloist or Group: Barrio Fino en Directo, Daddy Yankee
- Main English Record of the Year: Oral Fixation Vol. 2, Shakira
- Main English Song of the Year: Hips Don't Lie, Shakira
- Main English Breakthrough of the Year: Whatever People Say I Am, That's What I'm Not, Arctic Monkeys
- Popular Record of the Year: Mas Capaces que Nunca, K-Paz de la Sierra
- Popular Song of the Year: Mi Credo, K-Paz de la Sierra
- Popular Breakthrough of the Year: Erasmo: El Conde de Xalpatlahuac, Erasmo
- Popular Norteño Soloist or Group: Tu Sombra, Grupo Pesado
- Popular Grupero Soloist or Group: No Es Brujería, Ana Bárbara
- Popular Ranchero Soloist or Group: Tu Orgullo, Alicia Villarreal
- Popular Banda/Duranguense Soloist or Group: Mas Capaces que Nunca, K-Paz de la Sierra
- Popular Tropical Soloist or Group: Margarita Sinfónica, Margarita "La Diosa de la Cumbia"
- Video of the Year: Hips Don't Lie, Shakira
- Special Tribute to Trajectory: Marco Antonio Solís
- Premio Social a la Música: Día de Enero, Shakira

Special Awards

- People Choice Award: Alejandro Fernández
- Sales Award Spanish - Male: México - Madrid: En Directo Y Sin Escalas, Alejandro Fernández
- Sales Award Spanish - Female: La Voz de un Ángel, Yuridia
- Sales Award Popular: Fuego, A.B. Quintanilla & Kumbia Kings
- Sales Award English: Monkey Business, The Black Eyed Peas

== 2007 ==
- Main Spanish Record of the Year: Papito, Miguel Bosé
- Main Spanish Song of the Year: Te Lo Agradezco, Pero No, Alejandro Sanz & Shakira
- Main Spanish Breakthrough of the Year: Esta Es Mi Vida, Jesse & Joy
- Latin Pop Male: Viento a Favor, Alejandro Fernández
- Latin Pop Female: Utopía, Belinda
- Latin Pop Group: El Mundo Se Equivoca, La 5ª Estación
- Latin Rock Soloist or Group: Memo Rex Commander y el Corazón Atómico de la Vía Láctea, Zoé
- Main English Record of the Year: B'Day, Beyoncé
- Main English Song of the Year: Rudebox, Robbie Williams
- Main English Breakthrough of the Year: Alright, Still, Lily Allen
- Popular Record of the Year: Conquistando Corazones, K-Paz de la Sierra
- Popular Song of the Year: Por Amarte, Pepe Aguilar
- Popular Breakthrough of the Year: Destilando Amor, Angélica Rivera
- Popular Norteño Soloist or Group: Crossroads: Cruce de Caminos, Intocable
- Popular Grupero Soloist or Group: Trozos de Mi Alma, Vol. 2, Marco Antonio Solís
- Popular Ranchero Soloist or Group: Enamorado, Pepe Aguilar
- Popular Banda/Duranguense Soloist or Group: Conquistando Corazones, K-Paz de la Sierra
- Popular Tropical Soloist or Group: La Llave de Mi Corazón, Juan Luis Guerra
- Video of the Year: Me Muero, La 5ª Estación
- Special Tribute to Trajectory: Timbiriche
- Premio Social a la Música: Timbiriche

Special Awards

- Special Tribute to Trajectory: Yuri for 30 years
- Special Tribute to Trajectory: Los Joao for 35 years
- Award Básico 40: Aleks Syntek
- Award Ke Buena: Víctor García
- Best Selling Ringtone: Rompe, Daddy Yankee
- Best Selling Mastertone: Labios Compartidos, Maná

== 2008 ==
- Main Spanish Record of the Year: Papitour, Miguel Bosé
- Main Spanish Song of the Year: Te Quiero, Nigga
- Main Spanish Breakthrough of the Year: Mediocre, Ximena Sariñana
- Latin Pop Male: La Vida Es Un Ratico, Juanes
- Latin Pop Female: Entre Mariposas, Yuridia
- Latin Pop Group: Fantasía Pop, Belanova
- Latin Rock Soloist or Group: Sino, Café Tacuba
- Main English Record of the Year: Hard Candy, Madonna
- Main English Song of the Year: 4 Minutes, Madonna
- Main English Breakthrough of the Year: Jonas Brothers, Jonas Brothers
- Popular Record of the Year: Para Siempre, Vicente Fernández
- Popular Song of the Year: Estos Celos, Vicente Fernández
- Popular Breakthrough of the Year: Pensando En Tí, Germán Montero
- Popular Norteño Soloist or Group: 2c, Intocable
- Popular Grupero Soloist or Group: Una Noche en Madrid, Marco Antonio Solís
- Popular Ranchero Soloist or Group: Para Siempre, Vicente Fernández
- Popular Banda/Duranguense Soloist or Group: Y Que Quede Claro, La Arrolladora Banda El Limón
- Popular Tropical Soloist or Group: Tentaciones, Margarita "La Diosa de la Cumbia"
- Video of the Year: Me Enamora, Juanes
- Soundtrack Theme: Fuego En La Sangre, Vicente Fernández
- Special Tribute to Trajectory: Miguel Bosé
- Premio Social a la Música: Kudai

Special Awards

- People's Choice Award: Pepe Aguilar

== 2009 ==
- Main Spanish Record of the Year:
  - Aleks Syntek - 20 Años En Vivo
  - Calle 13 - Los de Atrás Vienen Conmigo
  - La Quinta Estación - Sin Frenos
  - Wisin & Yandel - La Revolución
  - Zoé - Reptilectric - Winner
- Main Spanish Song of the Year:
  - "Mañana Es Para Siempre" - Alejandro Fernández
  - "Te Amo" - Alexander Acha
  - "No Hay Nadie Como Tú" - Calle 13 feat. Café Tacvba
  - "Tu No Eres Para Mí" - Fanny Lú
  - "No Me Doy Por Vencido" - Luis Fonsi - Winner
- Main Spanish Breakthrough of the Year:
  - Alexander Acha - Winner
  - Beto Cuevas
  - Paty Cantú
  - Tush
  - Victor & Leo
- Latin Pop Male:
  - Aleks Syntek
  - Chayanne
  - Luis Fonsi - Winner
  - Reily
  - Alexander Acha
- Latin Pop Female:
  - Laura Pausini
  - Natalia Lafourcade
  - Fanny Lú
  - María José - Winner
  - Paty Cantú
- Latin Pop Group:
  - Belanova
  - Calle 13
  - Ha*Ash
  - La Quinta Estación - Winner
  - Wisin & Yandel
- Latin Rock Soloist or Group:
  - Babasónicos
  - Kinky
  - Zoé - Winner
  - Moderatto
  - Beto Cuevas
- Main English Record of the Year:
  - I Am... Sasha Fierce - Beyoncé
  - Circus - Britney Spears
  - The Fame - Lady Gaga - Winner
  - No Line on the Horizon - U2
  - Prospekt's March EP - Coldplay
- Main English Song of the Year:
  - "Single Ladies (Put a Ring on It)" - Beyoncé
  - "Womanizer" - Britney Spears
  - "Life In Technicolor" - Coldplay
  - "Poker Face" - Lady Gaga - Winner
  - "Get On Your Boots" - U2
- 'Main English Breakthrough of the Year:
  - Demi Lovato
  - Katy Perry
  - Lady Gaga - Winner
  - The Ting Tings
  - The Veronicas
- Video of The Year:
  - "Te Amo" - Alexander Acha
  - "Te Presumo" - Banda El Recodo de Don Cruz Lizárraga
  - Tu No Eres Para Mí" - Fanny Lú
  - Causa y Efecto - Paulina Rubio
  - Reptilectric - Zoé - Winner
- Soundtrack Theme:
  - "Mundo de Caramelo" - Danna Paola - Winner
  - "En Cambio No" - Laura Pausini
  - "Juro Que Te Amo" - David Bisbal
  - "Mañana Es Para Siempre" - Alejandro Fernández
  - "Quiero Que Me Quieras" - Gael García Bernal
  - "Un Gancho Al Corazón" - Playa Limbo

== 2012 ==
- Main Spanish Record of the Year: MTV Unplugged/Música de Fondo, Zoé
- Main Spanish Song of the Year: Labios Rotos, Zoé
- Main Spanish Breakthrough of the Year: Al Fin Te Encontré, Río Roma
- Latin Pop Male: Viva el Príncipe, Cristian Castro
- Latin Pop Female: 20 Años de Éxitos En Vivo con Moderatto, Alejandra Guzmán
- Latin Pop Group: A Tiempo, Ha*Ash
- Latin Rock Soloist or Group: MTV Unplugged/Música de Fondo, Zoé
- Latin Rock Breakthrough: Remando, Saúl Hernández
- Latin Soloist or Group: 30 años de cumbia, Margarita La Diosa de la Cumbia
- Urban Soloist or Group: Entren Los Que Quieran, Calle 13
- Main English Record of the Year: 21, Adele
- Popular Record of the Year: MTV Unplugged: Los Tigres del Norte and Friends, Los Tigres del Norte
- Popular Song of the Year: A Dónde Vamos a Parar, Marco Antonio Solís
- Popular Breakthrough of the Year: Prisionero de tus brazos, Beto Zapata
- Popular Norteño Soloist or Group: MTV Unplugged: Los Tigres del Norte and Friends, Los Tigres del Norte
- Popular Grupero Soloist or Group: En Total Plenitud, Marco Antonio Solís
- Popular Ranchero Soloist or Group: El Hombre Que Más Te Amó, Vicente Fernández
- Popular Banda/Duranguense Soloist or Group: Del Rancho Para el Mundo, Espinoza Paz
- Soundtrack Theme: Día de Suerte, Alejandra Guzmán
- Special Tribute to Trajectory: Chayanne & Emmanuel
- Premio Social a la Música: Margarita La Diosa de la Cumbia

Special Awards

- Best songwriters: Lola Beltrán, Pedro Infante, Luis Pérez Meza, Don Cruz Lizárraga & José Ángel Espinoza

== 2013 ==
- Main Spanish Record of the Year: ¿Con Quien Se Queda El Perro?, Jesse & Joy
- Main Spanish Song of the Year: Corre, Jesse & Joy
- Main Spanish Breakthrough of the Year: Na Balada, Michel Teló
- Main Spanish Contemporary Artist: Pecados y milagros, Lila Downs
- Latin Pop Male: La Música No Se Toca, Alejandro Sanz
- Latin Pop Female: Mujer Divina – Homenaje a Agustín Lara, Natalia Lafourcade
- Latin Pop Group: ¿Con Quien Se Queda El Perro?, Jesse & Joy
- Latin Rock Soloist or Group: El Objeto Antes Llamado Disco, Café Tacuba
- Electronic Soloist or Group: Inténtalo, 3Ball MTY
- Latin Soloist or Group: Pecados y milagros, Lila Downs
- Urban Soloist or Group: Inténtalo, 3Ball MTY
- Main English Record of the Year: Live at the Royal Albert Hall, Adele
- Main English Song of the Year: Diamonds, Rihanna
- Popular Record of the Year: Joyas Prestadas, Jenni Rivera
- Popular Song of the Year: Un Hombre Normal, Espinoza Paz
- Popular Breakthrough of the Year: Inténtalo, 3Ball MTY
- Popular Norteño Soloist or Group: Mi Promesa, Grupo Pesado
- Popular Ranchero Soloist or Group: Otra Vez, Vicente Fernández
- Popular Banda/Duranguense Soloist or Group: Joyas Prestadas, Jenni Rivera
- Soundtrack Theme: No Me Compares, Alejandro Sanz
- Special Tribute to Trajectory: Manuel Mijares
- Premio Social a la Música: Emmanuel
- Artist of the Year: Alejandro Sanz

Special Awards

- People's Choice Award: Alejandro Sanz
- Premio Disco Concepto y Gira del Año: Sasha, Benny y Erik

== See also ==
- Mexican music awards
