= Un Mexicano en la México =

Live album by Vicente Fernández
- Released: July 20, 2010
- Recorded: September 15, 1984
- Genre: Mariachi
- Length: 62:35
- Label: Sony Music

Vicente Fernández chronology
Necesito de Tí (2009)	Un Mexicano en la México (2010)	El Hombre Que Más Te Amó (2010)

Un Mexicano en la México ("A Mexican in Mexico") is the title of a live album and DVD released by the Mexican performer Vicente Fernández on October 5, 2010.

== Track listing ==
No.	Title	Length
1.	"No Me Se Rajar"	2:59
2.	"Por un Amor"	3:23
3.	"La Diferencia"	3:24
4.	"La Ley del Monte"	2:23
5.	"Hermoso Cariño"	2:35
6.	"Motivos"	3:04
7.	"El Jalisciense"	2:37
8.	"El Ranchero"	1:59
9.	"La Primera Caricia"	3:01
10.	"Dolor"	3:07
11.	"Yo Quiero Ser"	2:50
12.	"Sin Que Lo Sepas Tu"	2:57
13.	"Que Te Vaya Bonito"	3:40
14.	"México Lindo Y Querido"	3:48
15.	"Si Acaso Vuelves/Cruz de Olvido"	6:32
16.	"De 7 a 9"	3:09
17.	"Que Te Vas Te Vas"	2:39
18.	"De Que Manera Te Olvido"	3:14
19.	"Tu Camino y el Mio"	2:04
20.	"Volver Volver"	3:17

== Sales and certifications ==
Region	Certification	Certified units/sales
Mexico (AMPROFON)	Platinum	60,000^{^}
^{^} Shipments figures based on certification alone.
