= List of number-one Billboard Top Latin Albums of 2008 =

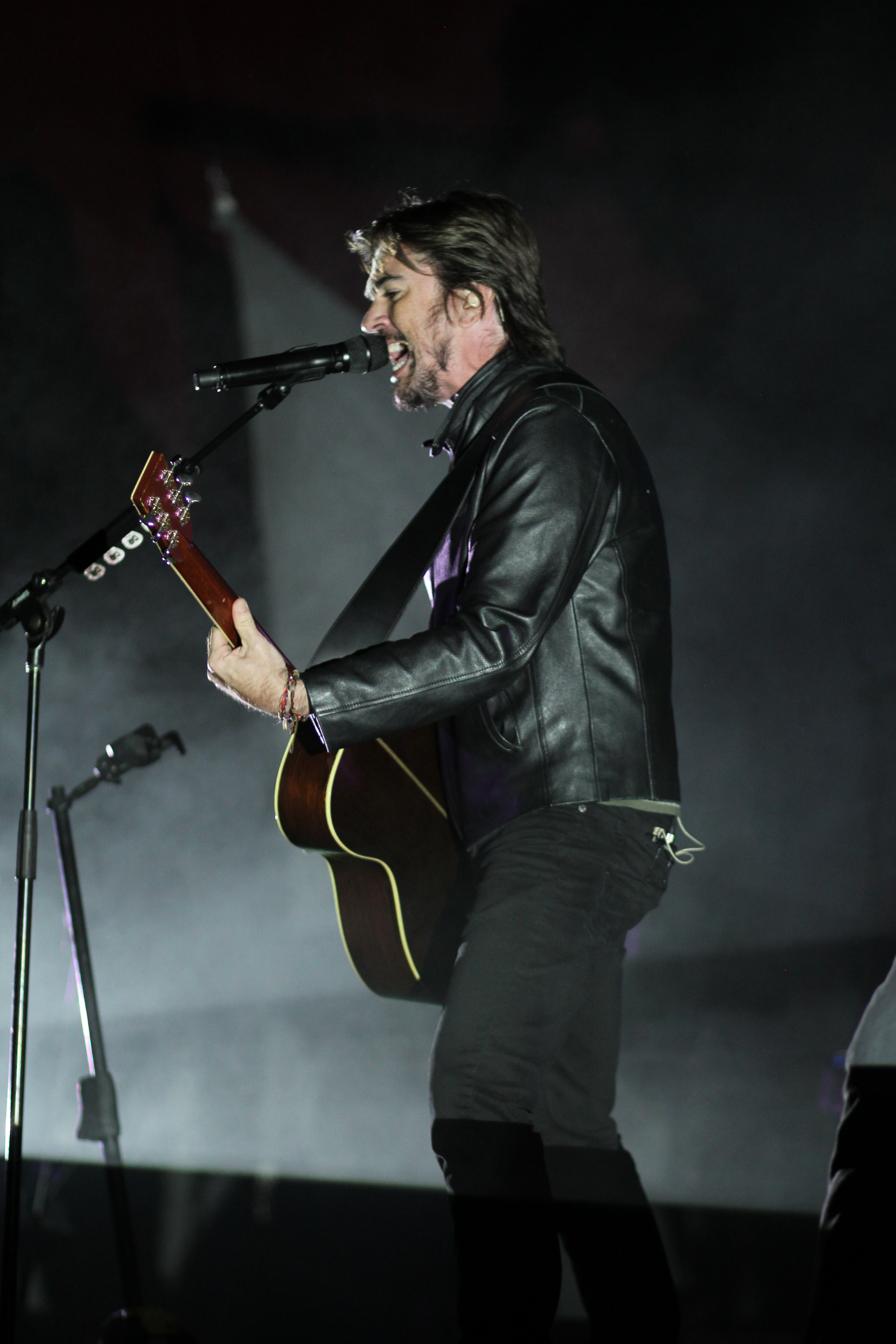
La Vida... Es un Ratico by singer Juanes was the first number-one album of 2008.

Cómplices by Luis Miguel became his eighth number-one album on the Top Latin Albums chart.

The Billboard Top Latin albums chart, published in Billboard magazine, is a record chart that features Latin music sales information. This data are compiled by Nielsen SoundScan from a sample that includes music stores, music departments at electronics and department stores, Internet sales (both physical and digital) and verifiable sales from concert venues in the United States.

There were 23 number-one albums in 2008; one of these, La Vida... Es un Ratico by Colombian singer-songwriter Juanes, won five Latin Grammy Awards, including Album of the Year. One month after the death of their lead vocalist Sergio Gómez in late December 2007, the Chicago-based group K-Paz de la Sierra returned to the top of the chart with Capaz de Todo Por Tí, which was number one for six consecutive weeks. Cómplices, the eighth number-one album by Mexican singer Luis Miguel, debuted at number 10 on the Billboard 200, the highest peak for the singer on that chart, with 32,000 album units sold. This album also gave the singer the record for the most number-one albums on this chart for one month, until it was tied by fellow Mexican singer-songwriters Marco Antonio Solís and Los Temerarios. This record was broken on October 25, 2008, by Solís with the debut of his ninth number-one album No Molestar.

Vicente Fernández's Para Siempre won the Latin Grammy Award for Best Ranchero Album; it spent three non-consecutive weeks at the top of the chart. Primera Fila, a live album by Fernández, was the last number-one album of 2008. With 26,000 album units sold, Daddy Yankee debuted at number 13 on the Billboard 200 with Talento de Barrio, a soundtrack for the movie that starred the reggaeton performer, which also debuted at number one on this chart. Wisin & Yandel returned to number one with Los Extraterrestres, an album that was awarded with the Latin Grammy Award for Best Urban Music Album. and ended the year as the best selling Latin album of 2008. On November 29, another Wisin & Yandel recording, a collaboration with DJ Nesty, titled La Mente Maestra debuted at number one. R.K.M & Ken-Y, Flex, Jenni Rivera and Los Pikadientes de Caborca peaked at number one for the first time in their careers. Luis Fonsi's Palabras del Silencio, earned his best sales week ever with 30,000 album copies sold and the second-largest sales week of the year for a Latin performer; only Luis Miguel's Cómplices sold more (32,000 albums in May). This album became the second number-one album on this chart for Fonsi.

== Albums ==
Chart date	Album	Artist	Reference
January 5	La Vida... Es un Ratico (Life... Is a Moment)	Juanes	
January 12	Capaz de Todo Por Tí (Capable of Anything for You)	K-Paz de la Sierra	
January 19	Capaz de Todo Por Tí (Capable of Anything for You)	K-Paz de la Sierra	
January 26	Capaz de Todo Por Tí (Capable of Anything for You)	K-Paz de la Sierra	
February 2	Capaz de Todo Por Tí (Capable of Anything for You)	K-Paz de la Sierra	
February 9	Capaz de Todo Por Tí (Capable of Anything for You)	K-Paz de la Sierra	
February 16	Capaz de Todo Por Tí (Capable of Anything for You)	K-Paz de la Sierra	
February 23	Que Ganas de Volver (I Want to Get Back)	Conjunto Primavera	
March 1	Todo Cambió (Everything Changed)	Camila	
March 8	En Vivo: Desde el Auditorio Nacional (Live from Mexican Auditorium)	K-Paz de la Sierra	
March 15	Te Quiero: Romantic Style In Da World (I Love You)	Flex	
March 22	Raíces (Roots)	Los Tigres del Norte	
March 29	Te Quiero	Flex	
April 5	Te Quiero	Flex	
April 12	95/08	Enrique Iglesias	
April 19	95/08	Enrique Iglesias	
April 26	95/08	Enrique Iglesias	
May 3	95/08	Enrique Iglesias	
May 10	95/08	Enrique Iglesias	
May 17	Arde El Cielo (The Sky Is Burning)	Maná	
May 24	Cómplices (Accomplices)	Luis Miguel	
May 31	Cómplices (Accomplices)	Luis Miguel	
June 7	Para Siempre (Forever)	Vicente Fernández	
June 14	Wisin vs. Yandel: Los Extraterrestres (Wisin vs. Yandel: The Extraterrestrials)	Wisin & Yandel	
June 21	Para Siempre	Vicente Fernández	
June 28	Para Siempre	Vicente Fernández	
July 5	Una Noche en Madrid (A Night in Madrid)	Marco Antonio Solís	
July 12	Una Noche en Madrid (A Night in Madrid)	Marco Antonio Solís	
July 19	Una Noche en Madrid (A Night in Madrid)	Marco Antonio Solís	
July 26	Si Tú Te Vas (If You Go)	Los Temerarios	
August 2	Si Tú Te Vas (If You Go)	Los Temerarios	
August 9	Si Tú Te Vas (If You Go)	Los Temerarios	
August 16	Si Tú Te Vas (If You Go)	Los Temerarios	
August 23	Si Tú Te Vas (If You Go)	Los Temerarios	
August 30	Talento de Barrio (Hood Talent)	Daddy Yankee	
September 6	Talento de Barrio (Hood Talent)	Daddy Yankee	
September 13	Palabras del Silencio (Words from Silence)	Luis Fonsi	
September 20	Palabras del Silencio (Words from Silence)	Luis Fonsi	
September 27	Jenni	Jenni Rivera	
October 4	The Royalty: La Realeza	R.K.M & Ken-Y	
October 11	Vámonos Pa'l Río (Let's Go To The River)	Los Pikadientes de Caborca	
October 18	Vámonos Pa'l Río (Let's Go To The River)	Los Pikadientes de Caborca	
October 25	No Molestar (Do Not Disturb)	Marco Antonio Solis	
November 1	No Molestar (Do Not Disturb)	Marco Antonio Solis	
November 8	No Molestar (Do Not Disturb)	Marco Antonio Solis	
November 15	No Molestar (Do Not Disturb)	Marco Antonio Solis	
November 22	No Molestar (Do Not Disturb)	Marco Antonio Solis	
November 29	Wisin & Yandel Presentan: La Mente Maestra (Wisin & Yandel presents: Mastermind)	DJ Nesty and Wisin & Yandel	
December 6	5to Piso (5th Floor)	Ricardo Arjona	
December 13	5to Piso (5th Floor)	Ricardo Arjona	
December 20	Primera Fila (First Row)	Vicente Fernández	
December 27	Primera Fila (First Row)	Vicente Fernández	

== See also ==
- Billboard Top Latin Albums
