= Para Siempre (Vicente Fernández song) =

2008 single by Vicente Fernández

Single by Vicente Fernández

from the album Para Siempre
- Released: January 21, 2008 (Mexico); May 26, 2008 (US)
- Genre: Mariachi; bolero
- Length: 2:52
- Label: Norte
- Songwriter: Joan Sebastian
- Producer: Joan Sebastian

Vicente Fernández singles chronology
"La Derrota" (2008)	"Para Siempre" (2008)	"Un Millón de Primaveras" (2008)

"Para Siempre" ("Forever") is a song written and produced by Mexican singer-songwriter Joan Sebastian and recorded by Mexican performer Vicente Fernández. It was released as the lead single from Fernández's 79th studio album Para Siempre.

This single was a very successful release, peaking at number two in the Hot Latin Tracks in United States and reaching the top spot of the charts in Mexico and Colombia. It was used also as the main theme for the Mexican telenovela Fuego en la sangre. In Mexico it won the Best Song from a Telenovela, Movies or Series award at the Premios Oye!. A live version of this track is included on the live album titled Primera Fila.

== Song information ==
"Para Siempre" is included on the 79th studio album by Vicente Fernández titled Para Siempre and was chosen to be the third single from this album.. In Mexico, it is featured as the main theme for the telenovela Fuego en la sangre. This song won the Best Song from a Telenovela, Movie or Series award at the Premios Oye!. Joan Sebastian also received two awards by the American Society of Composers, Authors and Publishers for this single: Song of the Year and Best Regional Music song. The live version of this single, included on Fernández' Primera Fila was very well reviewed by Jason Birchmeier of Allmusic naming it "delightful"; this version is sequenced back to back with the song "Estos Celos" towards the finale of the concert and include lively participation by the crowd, which sings and claps along with evident glee.

== Chart performance ==
This track debuted at number 26 in the Billboard Latin Regional Mexican Airplay on June 7, 2008, where it peaked at the top of the chart nine weeks later, and went on to spend three consecutive weeks at number-one and 30 weeks in the chart. Just like the first single from Para Siempre, "Estos Celos", this single also enjoyed crossover appeal to other formats, like the Latin Pop Airplay charts, where it peaked at number 11.

On the Billboard Hot Latin Songs the single peaked at number two and spent 31 weeks within the Top 40. This is the highest peak for the singer on this chart since his 1995 single "Aunque Me Duela el Alma", which also peaked at number two. It also peaked at number one in Mexico and Colombia. The ringtone for "Para Siempre" received a platinum certification for sales over 25,000 units and has been one on the top two sellers for Sony BMG Norte since the album release.

"Para Siempre" ranked 4th in the Billboard Regional Mexican Songs Year-End Charts of 2008. It also ranked at number six at the Hot Latin Songs year-end recap of 2008.

== Charts ==
=== Weekly charts ===
Chart (2008)	Peak position
US Bubbling Under Hot 100 (Billboard)	7
US Hot Latin Songs (Billboard)	2
US Regional Mexican Airplay (Billboard)	1

=== Year-end charts ===
Chart (2008)	Position
US Hot Latin Songs (Billboard)	6

=== Certifications ===
Region	Certification	Certified units/sales
Mexico (AMPROFON) Digital download	Platinum+Gold	90,000^{*}
^{*} Sales figures based on certification alone.

== Personnel ==
The following people contributed to "Para Siempre":

- Joan Sebastían — guitar, arranger, producer
- Miguel Trujillo — executive producer
- Dennis F. Parker — engineer/mixer, mastering engineer
- Rigoberto Alfaro — arranger
- Manuel Cázarez — arranger
- Javier Alfaro — violin
- Dave Rivera — violin
- Javier Carrillo — violin
- Hugo Colula — violin
- Francisco Cedillo — viola
- Monica Del Aguila — cello
- Bernardino De Santiago — guitarrón
- Moisés Garcia — trumpet
