= Senator Ramirez =

Senator Ramirez or Ramírez may refer to:

- Florencio Ramirez (1915–1995), Senate of Guam
- Graco Ramírez (born 1949), Senate of Mexico
- Heladio Ramírez (born 1939), Senate of Mexico
- Itzamar Peña Ramírez (born 1974), Senate of Puerto Rico
- Juan Andrés Ramírez (born 1947), Senate of Uruguay
- Juan Gerardo Flores Ramírez (born 1968), Senate of Mexico
- Juan Lozano Ramírez (born 1964), Senate of Colombia
- Marta Lucía Ramírez (born 1954), Senate of Colombia
- Miriam Ramírez (born 1941), Senate of Puerto Rico
- Severo Colberg Ramírez (1924–1990), Senate of Puerto Rico
- Victor R. Ramirez (born 1974), Maryland State Senate
