= Fuego en la sangre (TV series) =

Mexican telenovela

- Genre: Telenovela
- Directed by: Miguel Córcega; Jorge Édgar Ramírez; Alberto Díaz
- Starring: Adela Noriega; Eduardo Yáñez; Jorge Salinas; Diana Bracho; María Sorté; Nora Salinas; Pablo Montero; Elizabeth Álvarez; Guillermo García Cantú; René Casados; Ninel Conde
- Theme music composer: Joan Sebastian
- Opening theme: "Para siempre" by Vicente Fernández
- Country of origin: Mexico
- Original language: Spanish
- No. of seasons: 1
- No. of episodes: 206 (Original version); 200 (International version)

Production
- Executive producer: Salvador Mejía Alejandre
- Running time: 40-45 minutes
- Production company: Televisa

Original release
- Network: Canal de las Estrellas
- Release: January 21 – November 2, 2008

Related
- Las aguas mansas (1994-1995); Pasión de gavilanes (2003-2004) / (2022); Gavilanes (2010-2011); Tierra de reyes (2014-2015); Pasión de amor (2015-2016)

Fuego en la sangre (Translated to "Fire in the Blood", but in English called Burning for Revenge) is a Mexican telenovela that began transmissions on January 21, 2008, through Mexico's Canal de las Estrellas network.

Starring Adela Noriega, Eduardo Yáñez, Jorge Salinas, Diana Bracho, María Sorté, Nora Salinas, Pablo Montero, Elizabeth Álvarez, Guillermo García Cantú, René Casados and Ninel Conde.

It is the Mexican adaptation of the Colombian 1994 soap opera Las aguas mansas, which had previously been remade into a popular 2003 version titled Pasión de gavilanes and produced by RTI Colombia in association with Telemundo and Caracol Televisión.

The theme song called "Para siempre" was composed by Joan Sebastian and sung by Vicente Fernández.

The telenovela received the TVyNovelas Award for Best Telenovela of the Year in the 2009 TVyNovelas Awards.

== Broadcast history ==
From January 21 to November 2, 2008, Canal de las Estrellas broadcast Fuego en la sangre weeknights at 9pm.

From April 28, 2008 to February 20, 2009, Univision broadcast the series weeknights at 9pm/8c replacing Pasión. The last episode was broadcast on February 20, 2009, with Mañana es para siempre replacing it on February 23, 2009.

From July 22, 2013 to February 7, 2014, Canal de las Estrellas broadcast reruns of Fuego en la sangre weekdays at 11:30am.

As of April 18, 2016 to January 27, 2017, Tlnovelas broadcast the telenovela at 11:00, 17:00 and 23:00 replacing Sortilegio, with Amores verdaderos replacing it on January 30.

== Plot ==
This story of love, heartbreak, revenge, lies, and betrayal centers on the lives of the Reyes brothers: Juan (Eduardo Yáñez), Óscar (Jorge Salinas), and Franco (Pablo Montero), who, at the grave of their younger sister, Libia (Sherlyn), swear to avenge her death.

Shortly before her demise, Libia was having a clandestine affair with the rancher Bernardo Elizondo (Carlos Bracho), a man several years her senior, from whom she had recently become pregnant. Although Bernardo claimed to truly love Libia and be willing to marry her, he never had the chance, as he died suddenly after a fall from his horse. Despair seemed to drive the young woman to take her own life upon learning of her beloved's passing.

Despite the fact that the police report states that Libia's death was a suicide, her brothers remain unconvinced. Therefore, they decide to enter the Elizondo ranch disguised as bricklayers and carpenters, intending to find out what really happened.

Upon arriving at the ranch, they discover that Bernardo was actually a married man who had hidden this truth from their sister. There they meet Bernardo's three beautiful daughters: Sofía (Adela Noriega), Sarita (Nora Salinas), and Jimena (Elizabeth Álvarez).

The three men, upon encountering the young women, decide that the best way to avenge Libia's tragic fate is to make them experience the same pain. Their initial plan is to seduce them, make them fall in love, and then abandon them heartbroken, forcing them to endure the same suffering their sister had felt before dying. Juan chooses to seduce Sofía, Óscar chooses to seduce Jimena, and Franco chooses to seduce Sarita.

Their plan becomes complicated when all three develop romantic feelings for the women. Juan becomes involved with Sofía, who is portrayed as compassionate and charitable and has experienced sexual assault and a forced marriage arranged by her family to preserve their social reputation.

Now, the three brothers will be forced to choose between fulfilling the oath of vengeance they swore at their sister's grave or surrendering to the three women who taught them the meaning of true love.

== Cast ==
=== Main ===
- Adela Noriega as Sofía Elizondo Acevedo
- Eduardo Yáñez as Juan Reyes
- Jorge Salinas as Oscar Reyes
- Diana Bracho as Gabriela Acevedo de Elizondo
- María Sorté as Eva Rodríguez
- Nora Salinas as Sara "Sarita" Elizondo Acevedo
- Pablo Montero as Franco Reyes
- Elizabeth Álvarez as Jimena Elizondo Acevedo
- Guillermo García Cantú as Fernando Escandón
- René Casados as Father Tadeo
- Ninel Conde as Rosario Montes

=== Also main ===
- Aurora Clavel as Ofelia
- Joaquín Cordero as Agustín Acevedo

=== Recurring and guest stars ===
- Sergio Acosta as Armando Navarro
- Alejandro Aragón as Octavio Uribe
- Mario Arellano as Pablito
- Omar Ayala as Charro
- Juan Carlos Bonet as Bruno Ferraño
- Carlos Bracho as Bernardo Elizondo
- Luis Cadena as Fermín
- Eduardo Capetillo as Pedro Reyes
- Carlos Cardán as Apolinar
- Elsa Cárdenas as Chief Nun
- Albert Chávez as Juvencio
- Roberto D'Amico as Bishop
- Gilberto de Anda as Ricardo Uribe
- Radamés de Jesús as Eladio
- Fernando de la Flor as himself
- Cristián de la Fuente as Demián Ferrer
- Thelma Dorantes as Town lady
- Isaura Espinoza as Hortensia
- Vicente Fernández Jr. as Vicente Robles
- José Antonio Ferral as Saúl
- Juan Carlos Flores as Tobías
- Renata Flores as Petra Sánchez
- Julissa as Raquel Santos de Uribe
- Ricardo Kleinbaum as Lawyer Martínez
- Nicolás Krinis as Pancho
- Ernesto Laguardia as Juan José Robles
- Manuel Landeta as Anselmo Cruz
- Ismael Larumbe as Doctor
- Alberto Loztín as Pepe
- Rebeca Manríquez as María Caridad
- Ricardo Mansur as Doctor
- Margarita la Diosa de la Cumbia as herself
- Sergio Mayer as Román
- Antonio Medellín as Fabio
- Rodrigo Mejia as Benito Uribe
- Lourdes Munguía as María Libia Reyes de Robles
- Alma Muriel as Soledad
- Niurka as Maracuyá
- Adalberto Parra as Sorcerer
- Luis Fernando Peña as Rigoberto "Rigo"
- Silvia Pinal as Santa "Santita"
- Jaime Puga as Pollice commissioner
- Bobby Pulido as himself
- Gaby Ramírez as Eugenia
- David Rencoret as Dr. Gómez
- Patricia Reyes Spíndola as Quintina
- Luis Reynoso as Rosendo Aguirre
- Sergio Reynoso as "El Jefe"
- Fernando Robles as 'Edersandro'
- Miriam Said as Sister Martita
- Marcial Salinas as Nabor
- Blanca Sánchez as Aída de Acevedo
- Sherlyn as Libia Reyes
- Roberto Vander as Gilberto Castañeda
- Pietro Vannucci as Gonzalo
- Tony Vela as "El Coyote"
- Nora Velázquez as María Esperanza
- Ricardo Vera as Dr. Montes
- Sofía Vergara as Leonora Castañeda
- Susana Zabaleta as Ruth Uribe Santos
- Guillermo Zarur as Aragón
- Víctor Luis Zúñiga as Juliancito

== Soundtrack ==
The soundtrack to Fuego en la sangre was released on CD on November 14, 2008 in Mexico.

Track listing

No.	Title	Length
1.	"Y me he equivocado (Fuego en la sangre)" (Performed by Pablo Montero, Jorge Salinas and Eduardo Yáñez)	3:30
2.	"Sofía (Incidental)" (Composed by Mauricio Arriaga)	2:29
3.	"Esclavo y amo" (Performed by Eduardo Yáñez)	2:55
4.	"Juan (Incidental)" (Composed by José Antonio "Potro" Farías)	2:43
5.	"Juan charrasqueado" (Performed by Jorge Salinas)	3:45
6.	"Fernando (Incidental)" (Composed by José Antonio "Potro" Farías)	2:28
7.	"Yo no me caso compadre" (Performed by Patricia Reyes Spíndola)	2:42
8.	"Oscar (Incidental)" (Composed by José Antonio "Potro" Farías)	2:07
9.	"La canalla" (Performed by Vicente Fernández Jr.)	3:03
10.	"Por una cabeza" (Performed by Joaquín Cordero)	2:23
11.	"El bombón asesino (Cumbia)" (Performed by Ninel Conde)	3:15
12.	"Un montón de estrellas" (Performed by Eduardo Yáñez)	3:05
13.	"Yo lo comprendo" (Performed by María Sorté)	3:21
14.	"Pueden decir" (Performed by Jorge Salinas)	3:18
15.	"Golpes en el corazón" (Performed by Vicente Fernández Jr.)	3:57
16.	"Noche de ronda" (Performed by Joaquín Cordero)	2:42
17.	"El cable (Ven papi)" (Performed by Ninel Conde)	3:28
18.	"Si quieres verme llorar" (Performed by María Sorté)	3:30
19.	"Para siempre (Tema instrumental de la telenovela)" (Performed by Mariachi Potros de México de Miguel Darío)	2:48
20.	"Amor a medias (Bonus Track)" (Performed by Nora Salinas)	3:31

== Ratings ==
=== Mexico ===
Timeslot	# Ep.	Premiere		Finale		Rank	Season	Rating average
Timeslot	# Ep.	Date	Premiere Rating	Date	Finale Rating	Rank	Season	Rating average
Mondays—Fridays; 9:00pm	200	January 21, 2008	29.5	November 2, 2008	36.8	#1	2008-09	33.1

== DVD release ==

Fuego en la sangre was released in Mexico in a 4-disc DVD set in mid-2009. It contains all 200 episodes in abridged version.

A 2-disc US version containing English subtitles was released on September 1, 2009.

== Awards and nominations ==
Below is a listing of the most important awards and nominations received by the production:

Year	Award	Category	Nominee(s)	Result
2008	TV Adicto Golden Awards	Best Song	Fuego en la sangre	Won
2008	TV Adicto Golden Awards	Best Actress in a Comedy Role	Patricia Reyes Spíndola	Won
2008	TV Adicto Golden Awards	Best Male Villain	Guillermo García Cantú	Won
2008	TV Adicto Golden Awards	Best Leading Actress	María Sorté	Won
2008	TV Adicto Golden Awards	Best Male Lead	Eduardo Yáñez	Won
2008	TV Adicto Golden Awards	Best Script	Fuego en la sangre	Won
2008	TV Adicto Golden Awards	Best Direction	Fuego en la sangre	Won
2008	TV Adicto Golden Awards	Best Production	Fuego en la sangre	Won
2008	TV Adicto Golden Awards	Best Telenovela by Televisa	Fuego en la sangre	Won
2008	TV Adicto Golden Awards	Special Award for Great; Telenovela of the Year	Fuego en la sangre	Won
2009	TVyNovelas Awards	Best Telenovela	Salvador Mejía Alejandre	Won
2009	TVyNovelas Awards	Best Actress	Adela Noriega	Nominated
2009	TVyNovelas Awards	Best Actor	Eduardo Yáñez	Nominated
2009	TVyNovelas Awards	Best Actor	Jorge Salinas	Nominated
2009	TVyNovelas Awards	Best Antagonist Actress	Diana Bracho	Won
2009	TVyNovelas Awards	Best Antagonist Actor	Guillermo García Cantú	Won
2009	TVyNovelas Awards	Best Co-lead Actress	Patricia Reyes Spíndola	Won
2009	TVyNovelas Awards	Best Co-lead Actor	René Casados	Nominated
2009	TVyNovelas Awards	Best Original Story or Adaptation	Liliana Abud; Ricardo Fiallega	Nominated
2009	TVyNovelas Awards	Best Direction	Miguel Córcega; Jorge Édgar Ramírez; Alberto Díaz	Nominated
2009	TVyNovelas Awards	Best Direction of the Cameras	Manuel Barajas; Jesús Acuña Lee	Nominated
2009	Bravo Awards	Best Antagonist Actress	Diana Bracho	Won
2009	Bravo Awards	Best Antagonist Actor	Guillermo García Cantú	Won
2009	Latin ACE Awards	Best Actor	Eduardo Yáñez	Won
2009	Latin ACE Awards	Best Character Actress	María Sorté	Won
2010	Golden Awards Of The Decade	Best Song of the Decade	"Para siempre" by Vicente Fernández	Won
