= El Último Beso (Vicente Fernández song) =

Single by Vicente Fernández

from the album Primera Fila
- Released: December 28, 2007
- Genre: Mariachi
- Length: 2:53 (studio version); 3:04 (live version)
- Label: Norte
- Songwriter: Eric Santoyo
- Producers: Joan Sebastian (studio version), Gustavo Borner (live version)

Vicente Fernández singles chronology
"Un Millón de Primaveras" (2008)	"El Último Beso" (2007)	"Necesito de Tí" (2009)

"El Último Beso" ("The Last Kiss") is a song written and produced by Mexican singer-songwriter Joan Sebastian and recorded by Mexican performer Vicente Fernández. It was first included on Fernández' 79th studio album Para Siempre and then recorded live for his live album Primera Fila where it was released as the first single.

== Song information ==
"El Último Beso" was recorded and included on the 79th studio album by Vicente Fernández titled Para Siempre. Two years later was included on the set list for Fernández' live album Primera Fila. This performance was labeled as a "highlight of the show" by Jason Birchmeier of Allmusic. It was later released as the first single from this album.

== Chart performance ==
This song debuted on the Billboard Latin Regional Mexican Airplay chart in December 2008 at number 26, and peaked at number one ten weeks later. On the Billboard Hot Latin Songs chart peaked at number 1, giving Fernandez his first chart-topping single. With this single, Fernández, at 68, became the oldest performer to peak at number-one on this chart.

== Charts ==
Chart (2009)	Peak position
U.S. Billboard Hot Latin Songs	1
U.S. Billboard Latin Regional Mexican Airplay	1

== Personnel ==
The following people contributed to the original version of "El Último Beso":

- Joan Sebastían — Guitar, arranger, producer
- Miguel Trujillo — Executive producer
- Dennis Parker — Engineer/mixer, mastering engineer
- Rigoberto Alfaro — Arranger
- Manuel Cázarez — Arranger
- Mara Esquivel — A&R
- Javier Alfaro — Violin
- Dave Rivera — Violin
- Javier Carrillo — Violin
- Hugo Colula — Violin
- Francisco Cedillo — Viola
- Monica Del Aguila — Cello
- Bernardino De Santiago — Guitarrón
- Moisés Garcia — Trumpet
