= Para Siempre =

Studio album by Vicente Fernández
- Released: September 18, 2007
- Recorded: 2007
- Studios: JS Studios, Cuernavaca, Morelos
- Genres: Bolero, mariachi
- Length: 36:14
- Label: Sony BMG Norte
- Producer: Joan Sebastian

Vicente Fernández chronology
La Tragedia del Vaquero (2006)	Para Siempre (2007)	Canciones de sus Películas: El Arracadas (2008)

Singles from Para Siempre
- 1. "Estos Celos" Released: July 30, 2007; 2. "La Derrota" Released: November 12, 2007; 3. "Para Siempre" Released: January 21, 2008 (Mexico) May 26, 2008 (US); 4. "Un Millón de Primaveras" Released: June 17, 2008

Para Siempre (English: Forever) is the 79th studio album released by Mexican singer Vicente Fernández on September 18, 2007, by Sony BMG Norte. Written and produced by Joan Sebastian, and co-produced by Jesús Rincón, the album was met with instant success. It has sold two million units worldwide, and is one of the best-selling albums by Fernández. It spawned four hit singles: "Estos Celos", "La Derrota", "Un Millón de Primaveras", and the title track, the latter of which was used as the main theme to the telenovela Fuego En La Sangre, which brought the wider exposure to the album and helped it to stay on charts for over two years. It was named the best-selling Regional Mexican Album of the decade by Billboard magazine.

Originally conceived as a banda music project, the album earned Fernández a Latin Grammy Award for Best Ranchero Album, four Premios Oye! and a Grammy nomination. Para Siempre is considered responsible for bringing Mexican traditional music to a younger audience that had never listened to the singer before. Fernández released music videos for the twelve tracks and recorded a TV special on his ranch in Guadalajara, Jalisco. A sold-out promotional tour led to the recording of the live album Primera Fila, Fernández' follow up album.

== Background ==
Two recognized artists worked together for the first time on Para Siempre: Vicente Fernández, the "king" of Mexico's traditional ranchera music and one of that country's most recognizable and influential cultural icons, and singer-songwriter Joan Sebastian. Since Fernández's emergence in the mid-1960s, his popularity among Mexicans and Mexican-Americans has been likened to that of Frank Sinatra and Elvis Presley in the United States. His concerts both in Mexico and the United States routinely sell out and his 100-plus albums (including compilations) have reportedly sold 50 million copies. Sebastian has been celebrated by critics for his contribution to Mexican culture, thanks to his successful singer career and his work producing artists such as Antonio Aguilar, Pepe Aguilar, Lucero and Rocío Dúrcal; he is also a three time Grammy winner. Para Siempre, the 79th studio album by Fernández, was released in September 2007 in several countries. It was recorded to celebrate the 40th anniversary of his singing career, and is, according to Fernández's record label, one of his most important albums. Nevertheless, Sebastian said that the label did not have high expectations for the album.

== Recording ==
Fernández has stated that the album was conceived as a banda album with original music by Sebastian, a first for the singer; before this, in 1993, he included a cover of a song written by Sebastian titled "Verdad Que Duele" ("It Hurts") on his album Lástima Que Seas Ajena (A Shame You Belong to Another). Fernández' fans kept asking to record banda songs and written by Sebastian, prompting him to record the album. Fernández was not pleased with the idea of trading his classic mariachi style for banda, but agreed to record with Sebastian as a "thank you" to his fans. In the album liner notes the singer dedicated the album to his wife and included a message for this fans: "As long as you keep applauding, I will be singing 'forever'."

In late 2006, on Fernández' ranch in Guadalajara, Jalisco, he asked Sebastian for songs to record on his next album and they agreed that his next project would be to work with Fernández on the album. Sebastian began preparing the demos along with Beto Jiménez, and in early 2007 he told Fernández that the songs were ready. The singer flew to the producer's studio and recorded them. Fernández has said of working with Sebastian: "He is more than a friend, he is my brother, he writes excellent songs and has a great sensibility."

The album was recorded in Cuernavaca, Morelos at the JS Studios. "I went to one of his houses for a day and in less than seven hours my part of the album was ready, he put everything on the table, it's very good and romantic." Fernández kept his mariachi style on the album and the producer only added more tamboras; the singer was confident that this album was going to be a success, since his audience was demanding his union with Sebastian.

== Composition ==
From the 12 tracks included, only the title track presents a successful love relationship; while Sebastian's lyrics contain popular slang. Guitars, trumpets, violins and an accordion create the mariachi sound. The last track, "El Chofer" ("The Driver"), is a resembles José Alfredo Jiménez lyrical style, since Fernández travels "through Laredo to Michoacán." Some inspiration for the tracks came from the writer's crush on the Mexican actress Salma Hayek.

== Presentation ==
The album debuted on September 15, 2007, in a live concert at the Arena VFG in Guadalajara, Jalisco. Due to his dislike of massive tours, Fernández did not hold a large promotional campaign. Despite this, he performed live in the Mexican cities of Ciudad Juárez, Reynosa, Ciudad del Carmen, Lagos de Moreno, Sahuayo, Jiménez, Tijuana, Ensenada, San Luis Potosí, Mexico City, Guadalajara, Pachuca, and the American cities Phoenix, Denver, Atlanta, New York City, Miami, Chicago, Dallas, Houston, Los Angeles, Las Vegas and San Jose. This short tour garnered a nomination for Latin Tour of the Year at the Billboard Latin Music Awards. Vicente Fernández recorded a TV special on his ranch in Guadalajara, Jalisco, which was broadcast in late September 2007 and December 25, 2007, by Televisa.

== Reception ==
Professional ratings
Review scores
Source	Rating
About.com	4.5/5 stars
AllMusic	4/5 stars

On his review for Billboard En Español, Joel Brito declared that the tracks, "Un Millón de Primaveras" ("A Million Springs") and "El Último Beso" ("The Last Kiss"), are tender and desperate, with Vicente's voice powerful, sweet and cheerful; while "Estos Celos", was one of his best performances, along with "Niña Hechicera" ("Wicked Girl"). Jason Birchmeier of AllMusic gave the album four stars; he described it as "near-perfect" and "stellar". He praised the singing, the songwriting, and the instrumentation. Tijana Ilich of About.com gave the album a four and a half stars calling "Para Siempre for a melody as lovely as the story". According to the Colombian newspaper El Tiempo, Para Siempre was one of the most memorable albums of 2008, since Fernández dominates the "formula for success". For the Grammy Awards of 2008 the album received a nomination for Best Mexican/Mexican-American Album which it lost to 100% Mexicano by Pepe Aguilar. For the Latin Grammy Awards of 2008 Para Siempre won for Best Ranchero Album, and the first single "Estos Celos" won a Latin Grammy as Best Regional Mexican Song. The album was also nominated for Album of the Year, which was awarded to La Vida... Es un Ratico, by Colombian singer-songwriter Juanes. In Mexico, the album won four Premios Oye! in the following categories: Album of the Year, Song of the Year ("Estos Celos"), Best Ranchero Solo Artist and Best Telenovela, Movie or Series Song ("Para Siempre"). Joan Sebastian also received two awards by the American Society of Composers, Authors and Publishers for the title track: Song of the Year and Best Regional Music Song.

Vicente Fernández received five nominations for the 11th Billboard Latin Music Awards for his work on this album: Hot Latin Songs Artist, Hot Latin Song, Male ("Para Siempre"), Top Latin Albums Artist and Regional Mexican Airplay Song, Male ("Para Siempre" and "La Derrota"); Joan Sebastian was nominated for both Songwriter and Producer of the Year. On April 23, 2009, Fernández won the awards for Top Latin Albums Artist and Regional Mexican Airplay Song for the title track.

== Commercial release ==
=== Formats ===
The standard CD track listing was released on September 18, 2007, in Mexico, September 25, 2007 in United States and on February 26, 2008, in Spain with an album cover featuring the performer on a red background. On April 15, 2008, a CD/DVD format, with a black background on the cover was released, which included music videos for the 12 tracks recorded on Para Siempre, directed by Benjamin Hidalgo. A karaoke version of the album, with a yellow background, was released in April 2008.

=== Album ===
The recording debuted at number 51 on the Asociación Mexicana de Productores de Fonogramas y Videogramas Mexican Album Chart in October 2007 and climbed to the top position 21 weeks later; it spent a total of 14 weeks (non-consecutive) at the top of the chart. Para Siempre was certified diamond in Mexico for sales of 600,000 units. The sales were, according to Sony BMG Marketing Vice-president and A&R Nir Seroussi, a "phenomenon" because "the music market in Mexico is completely pirated" and Fernández's albums usually sell only 50,000 units per album.

In October 2007, the album debuted at number two on the Billboard Top Latin Albums and spent almost its entire chart run in the Top Ten; it topped the chart for five non-consecutive weeks, three weeks in 2008 and two in 2009, when it replaced Primera Fila, Fernández' follow-up live album, at the top of the chart, being the first time that a male performer replaces himself at number-one, and the first time since Selena did it in 1995. According to Sony BMG Norte, with over one million copies sold worldwide, Para Siempre is the most successful release by Vicente Fernández since 2000. Only seven other recordings by Fernández sold more units in the United States. It was the best-selling Regional Mexican album of 2008 and at the Billboard Top Latin Albums Year-end chart the album ranked at number two, behind Los Extraterrestres by Wisin & Yandel. Para Siempre was purchased on 50,000 mobile phones in Mexico, a "novelty" for a regional Mexican album. The album's success is attributed to a change in the sound; instead of employing multiple composers and producers as in previous albums, Para Siempre was written and produced entirely by Joan Sebastian. Miguel Trujillo, Sony BMG México CEO, commented about the album, "This album connected to a new generation that probably never listened to Vicente before." Para Siempre was named the best-selling Regional Mexican album of the decade in the United States. The album was the best selling Latin album of 2008 with 316,000.

=== Singles ===
Vicente Fernandez "El Último Beso" (2007)
"El Último Beso" was #1 on the Billboard Latin songs chart.

Vicente Fernandez "Para Siempre" (2007)
The only song to present a successful relationship.

On August 10, 2007, "Estos Celos" ("This Jealousy") was released in Mexico and United States as the lead single from the album. It peaked at number three in the Billboard Hot Latin Tracks, spent 40 weeks on the chart. "Estos Celos" ranked 28th in 2007 and 5th in 2008 in the Billboard Hot Regional Mexican Songs Year-end charts and its ringtone has been one on the top two sellers for Sony BMG Norte since the album release. In Colombia, broadcast of a cover version of this single performed by 'El Cape' Medina and Sneider Geles—recorded in vallenato style and included on the album Por Siempre y Para Siempre—was not allowed by the Colombian Music Association. The song was recorded without a planned commercial release, and the album recorded by Medina and Geles was only given to their friends, but the song unexpectedly achieved success on the Internet and some radio stations in Colombia. 'Cape' Medina said that the song may have been restricted out of the original Mexican publisher's jealousy. This version can still be found on file sharing websites and in the video sharing website YouTube. The second single released, "La Derrota" ("The Defeat"), peaked at number seven in the Hot Latin Tracks chart and number one in Mexico and Colombia. The third single, "Para Siempre", was featured as the main theme for the Mexican telenovela Fuego En La Sangre and hit the number two spot in the Latin charts in United States and number one in Mexico and Colombia. The fourth single yielded from the album was "Un Millón de Primaveras" which did not chart in United States, but peaked at number one in Mexico and Colombia. On the Billboard Year-end charts of 2008, Vicente Fernández appeared three times within the Top 25 with three singles from this release: the title track ranked at number six, "Estos Celos" at number 10 and "La Derrota" ended at number 25. The ringtones for "Estos Celos" and "Para Siempre" received a platinum certification for sales over 25,000 units.

== Track listing ==
All tracks are written by Joan Sebastian.

No.	Title	Length
1.	"La Derrota"	3:17
2.	"A Quién Vas a Amar Más Que a Mí"	2:48
3.	"Los Cazahuates"	3:26
4.	"Niña Hechicera"	3:05
5.	"Amor Sin Cuenta"	3:27
6.	"Para Siempre"	2:52
7.	"Estos Celos"	3:11
8.	"Adorado Tormento"	2:43
9.	"El Último Beso"	2:53
10.	"Un Millón de Primaveras"	2:54
11.	"El Último en la Fila"	3:22
12.	"El Chofer"	2:17

== Personnel ==
The following information is from AllMusic and from Para Siempre liner notes.

- Joan Sebastían – guitar, arranger, producer
- Miguel Trujillo – executive producer
- Dennis F. Parker – engineer/mixer, mastering engineer
- Rigoberto Alfaro – arranger
- Manuel Cázarez – arranger
- Mara Esquivel – A&R
- Javier Alfaro – violin
- Dave Rivera – violin
- Javier Carrillo – violin
- Hugo Colula — violin
- Francisco Cedillo – viola
- Monica Del Aguila – cello
- Cesar Martínez – cello
- Ildefonso Cedillo – cello
- Iván Namash – cello
- Bernardino De Santiago – guitarrón
- Moisés Garcia – trumpet
- Javier Serrano – trumpet
- Erick Romeo Mora Mota – guitar
- Santiago Turianzo – photography
- Ivonne Castañeda – graphic design

== Charts ==
=== Weekly charts ===
Chart (2007–2008)	Peak position
Mexico (Top 100 Mexico)	1
Spain (Top Albums Chart)	95
US Billboard 200	38
US Top Latin Albums (Billboard)	1
US Regional Mexican Albums (Billboard)	1

=== Year-end charts ===
Chart (2007)	Position
US Top Latin Albums (Billboard)	66
US Regional Mexican Albums (Billboard)	17

Chart (2008)	Position
US Billboard 200	141
US Top Latin Albums (Billboard)	2
US Regional Mexican Albums (Billboard)	1

Chart (2009)	Position
US Top Latin Albums (Billboard)	7
US Regional Mexican Albums (Billboard)	2

== Certifications ==
Region	Certification	Certified units/sales
Colombia	Gold	
Mexico (AMPROFON)	Diamond+Gold	550,000^{^}
United States (RIAA)	Gold	500,000^{^}
^{^} Shipments figures based on certification alone.

== See also ==
- Music of Mexico
- List of number-one albums of 2008 (Mexico)
- number-one album
