= Necesito de Ti (album) =

Studio album by Vicente Fernández
- Released: July 7, 2009
- Genres: Mariachi, ranchera
- Label: Sony Music

Vicente Fernández chronology
Primera Fila (2008)	Necesito de Ti (2009)	Un Mexicano en la México (2010)

Necesito de Ti (I Need You) is a studio album released by Mexican singer Vicente Fernández on July 7, 2009 by Sony BMG. The album earned the Grammy Award for Best Regional Mexican Album.

== Track listing ==
No.	Title	Length
1.	"Estado Civil"	2:53
2.	"Para Que Me Recuerdes"	2:51
3.	"A Puros Besos"	3:15
4.	"Tengo"	3:19
5.	"Mala"	3:04
6.	"Camino Al Cielo"	3:31
7.	"Que Dios Te Pague"	2:28
8.	"Necesito de Ti"	3:03
9.	"Me Tienes Mimado"	3:01
10.	"Tengo Una Amante"	3:45
11.	"Esa Noche Te Olvide"	2:27
12.	"Dueño Del Mundo"	3:10
13.	"Gracias"	2:54

== Charts ==
=== Weekly charts ===
Chart (2009)	Peak position
US Billboard 200	58
US Top Latin Albums (Billboard)	2
US Regional Mexican Albums (Billboard)	1

=== Year-end charts ===
Chart (2009)	Position
US Top Latin Albums (Billboard)	29
Chart (2010)	Position
US Top Latin Albums (Billboard)	70

== Sales and certifications ==
Region	Certification	Certified units/sales
Mexico (AMPROFON)	Platinum	60,000^{^}
^{^} Shipments figures based on certification alone.
