= Erick Romeo Mora Mota =

Mexican guitarist and music arranger

- Born: 1974 (age 51–52); Mexico City, Mexico
- Education: UNAM's National School of Music INBA's Superior School of Music

Erick Romeo Mora Mota (born 1974), is a Mexican guitarist and music arranger.

== Early life ==
He was born in Mexico City into a family dedicated to performing mariachi music for generations. At the age of 10, he took his first guitar class and at 15 he continued on to formal musical studies.

He achieved in Bachelor's in Guitar Performance, with honors, from UNAM's National School of Music (Escuela Nacional de Música). He later achieved another Bachelor's in Jazz from INBA's Superior School of Music (Escuela Superior de Música). He also studies at the Escuela Libre de Música de José F. Vázquez and at the Estudio de Arte Guitarrístico de Manuel López Ramos. He has taken private courses from professors David Russell, Abel Carlevaro, Roland Dyens and Marklen Belenko.

== Career ==
As a guitarist, Erick Mora has performed in numerous concert halls, and has performed with jazz, world music, and classical music ensembles. Since 2009, he has been the guitarist (soloist and as accompaniment) for Carlos Esteva's Orquesta Clásica de México.

As a studio musician, he has participated in records with various artists including Vicente Fernández, Alejandro Fernández, Pepe Aguilar, Aída Cuevas, Juan Valentin, Paquita la del Barrio, Lupita D`Alessio, Pedro Fernández, Julio Preciado, José José, Ana Gabriel, Rocío Durcal, Diego Verdaguer and Joan Sebastian.

As an educator, he has taught courses in Mexico City's Salón Chopin, at Enrique Valadez's Music Academy, and at the Grupo Escolar Luis Pasteur secondary school. Since 2012, he is a founding member and professor at Mexico City's first formal mariachi school, Escuela de Mariachi Ollin Yoliztli en Garibaldi, where he teaches Mariachi Guitar, Harmony, and an Ensemble course.

As a musical arranger, he has participated as musical director and arranger in records by Ana Gabriel, in her homage to Lucha Villa, and the Pancho Barraza band. He also provided the incidental music for National Geographic documentary film "Regresa", as well as many television commercials.

Throughout his performing career, he has also performed with mariachi ensembles such as Mariachi Águilas de América, el Mariachi Arriba Juárez and Mariachi México de Pepe Villa. He has also performed numerous musical genres, but prioritises mariachi music.
