= La Derrota =

Single by Vicente Fernández

from the album Para Siempre
- Released: November 12, 2007
- Genre: Mariachi
- Length: 3:17
- Label: Norte
- Songwriter: Joan Sebastian
- Producer: Joan Sebastian

Vicente Fernández singles chronology
"Estos Celos" (2008)	"La Derrota" (2007)	"Para Siempre" (2008)

"La Derrota" ("The Defeat") is a song written and produced by Mexican singer-songwriter Joan Sebastian and recorded by Mexican performer Vicente Fernández. It was released as the second single from Fernández's 79th studio album Para Siempre.

This single was a successful release, peaking at number seven in the Billboard Hot Latin Songs in United States and reaching the top spot of the charts in Mexico and Colombia.

== Song information ==
"La Derrota" is included on the 79th studio album by Vicente Fernández titled Para Siempre and was chosen to be the second single from this album. It debuted at number 29 in the Billboard Latin Regional Mexican Airplay on February 9, 2008, where it peaked at the top of the chart 15 weeks later, and went on to spend 29 weeks in the chart. On the Billboard Hot Latin Songs the single peaked at number 7 and spent 22 weeks within the Top 40. It also peaked at number one in Mexico and Colombia.

"Estos Celos" ranked 15th at the Billboard Regional Mexican Songs Year-End Charts of 2008. It also ranked at number 25 at the Hot Latin Songs recap of 2008.

== Chart performance ==
Chart (2008)	Peak position
Colombian Singles Chart	1
México Top Regional Songs	1
US Billboard Hot Latin Songs	7

== Personnel ==
The following people contributed to "La Derrota":

- Joan Sebastían — guitar, arranger, producer
- Miguel Trujillo — executive producer
- Dennis Parker — engineer/mixer, mastering engineer
- Rigoberto Alfaro — arranger
- Manuel Cázarez — arranger
- Mara Esquivel — A&R
- Javier Alfaro — violin
- Dave Rivera — violin
- Javier Carrillo — violin
- Hugo Colula — violin
- Francisco Cedillo — viola
- Monica Del Aguila — cello
- Bernardino De Santiago — guitarrón
- Moisés Garcia — trumpet
