= El Hombre Que Más Te Amó =

Studio album by Vicente Fernández
- Released: 5 October 2010
- Genre: Mariachi, Ranchera, Latin Pop
- Length: 36:40
- Label: Sony Music

Vicente Fernández chronology
| Un Mexicano en la México (2010) | El Hombre Que Más Te Amó (2010) | Otra Vez (2011) |

El Hombre Que Más Te Amó (The man that most loved you) is the 81st studio album released by Mexican singer Vicente Fernández on 5 October 2010 by Sony BMG.

== Track listing ==
| No. | Title | Writer(s) | Length |
|---|---|---|---|
| 1. | "Eres Mi Luz" | Manuel Eduardo Toscano | 2:28 |
| 2. | "Miedo" | Cristy Barba | 2:41 |
| 3. | "Regalo de Dios" | Toscano | 2:32 |
| 4. | "Millones de Gracias" | Toscano | 2:54 |
| 5. | "Si Estuvieras" | Toscano | 3:12 |
| 6. | "Pídele Perdón" | Toscano | 3:00 |
| 7. | "Moño Negro" | Martín Urieta | 2:43 |
| 8. | "Vete Mañana" | Toscano | 2:43 |
| 9. | "El Hombre Que Más Te Amó" | Abelardo "Papalotín" Flores | 3:16 |
| 10. | "Tu Mirada" | Toscano | 3:23 |
| 11. | "Tengo Que" | Toscano | 2:44 |
| 12. | "Con Uñas y Dientes" | Toscano | 2:33 |
| 13. | "Si Vas a Partir" | Toscano | 2:19 |

== Charts ==
=== Weekly charts ===
| Chart (2010) | Peak position |
|---|---|
| US Billboard 200 | 102 |
| US Top Latin Albums (Billboard) | 1 |
| US Regional Mexican Albums (Billboard) | 1 |

=== Year-end charts ===
| Chart (2010) | Position |
|---|---|
| US Top Latin Albums (Billboard) | 65 |
| Chart (2011) | Position |
| US Top Latin Albums (Billboard) | 28 |

== Sales and certifications ==
| Region | Certification | Certified units/sales |
|---|---|---|
| Mexico (AMPROFON) | Platinum | 60,000^{^} |
^{^} Shipments figures based on certification alone.

== See also ==
- List of number-one Billboard Latin Albums from the 2010s
