= Estos Celos =

Single by Vicente Fernández

from the album Para Siempre
- Released: July 30, 2007
- Genre: Mariachi
- Length: 3:11 (Main version); 4:52 (Live version)
- Label: Sony BMG Norte
- Songwriter: Joan Sebastian
- Producer: Joan Sebastian

Vicente Fernández singles chronology
"Que Chulada de Mujer" (2007)	"Estos Celos" (2007)	"La Derrota" (2008)

"Estos Celos" (English: This Jealousy) is a song written and produced by Mexican singer-songwriter Joan Sebastian and performed by Mexican recording artist Vicente Fernández. It was released as the lead single from Fernández's 79th studio album Para Siempre (2007).

This single was a very successful release, peaking at number three in the Billboard Hot Latin Tracks in United States and reaching the top spot of the charts in Mexico and Colombia. At the Latin Grammy Awards of 2008, Joan Sebastian received the award for Best Regional Mexican Song. In Mexico it won the Best Song award at the Premios Oye!. A live version of this track is included on the live album recorded by Fernández, titled Primera Fila.

== Song information ==
"Estos Celos" is included on the 79th studio album by Vicente Fernández titled Para Siempre and was chosen to be the lead single from this album. Since its release on July 30, 2007 it met commercial and critical acclaim. Jason Birchmeier of Allmusic on his review of the album, called this song a "standout performance," and praised the songwriting. Joel Brito of Billboard en Español named this song as one of Fernández's best songs ever. At the Latin Grammy Awards of 2008 this song won Best Regional Mexican song, which was awarded to Joan Sebastian. In Mexico, also won the Best Regional Mexican Song award at the Premios Oye!. The live version of this single, included on Fernández' Primera Fila was very well reviewed by Birchmeier on his review, naming it "delightful"; this version is sequenced back to back with the song "Para Siempre" towards the finale of the concert and include lively participation by the crowd, which sings and claps along with evident glee. In 2012, Dominican Republic recording artist David Kada covered the song in salsa whose version peaked at number 9 on the Billboard Tropical Songs chart.

== Chart performance ==
This track debuted at number 22 in the Billboard Latin Regional Mexican Airplay on September 1, 2007, where it peaked at the top of the chart six weeks later, and went on to spend 10 non-consecutive weeks at number-one and 42 weeks in the chart. This song also enjoyed crossover appeal to other formats, like the Latin Pop charts, where it peaked at number 33. On the Billboard Hot Latin Tracks the single peaked at number 3 and spent 40 weeks within the Top 40. It also peaked at number one in Mexico and Colombia. The ringtone for "Estos Celos" received a gold certification for sales over 10,000 units and has been one on the top two sellers for Sony BMG Norte since the album release.

"Estos Celos" ranked 28th in 2007 and 5th in 2008 in the Billboard Regional Mexican Songs Year-End Charts. It also ranked at number 10 at the Hot Latin Songs year-end chart of 2008.

== Charts ==
=== Weekly charts ===
Chart (2007)	Peak position
US Bubbling Under Hot 100 (Billboard)	14
US Hot Latin Songs (Billboard)	3
US Regional Mexican Airplay (Billboard)	1

=== Year-end charts ===
Chart (2008)	Position
US Hot Latin Songs (Billboard)	10

=== Certifications ===
Region	Certification	Certified units/sales
Mexico (AMPROFON) Ringtone	Gold	10,000^{*}
^{*} Sales figures based on certification alone.

== Controversy ==
In Colombia, a cover version of the single "Estos Celos" by 'El Cape' Medina and Sneider Geles recorded on vallenato style and included on the album Por Siempre y Para Siempre was not allowed to be broadcast by the Colombian Music Association. The song was recorded without a commercial release planned, and the album recorded by Medina and Geles was only given to their friends, but the song unexpectedly achieved success on Internet and some radio stations in Colombia. 'Cape' Medina said about the song: "We know that the original publisher in Mexico found out about our version in 'vallenato' style, and also they know about the success of our version and maybe out of jealousy they decided to restrict, not forbid, the song." To date, this version can still be found on file sharing websites and in the video sharing website YouTube.

== Personnel ==
The following people contributed to "Estos Celos":

- Joan Sebastian — guitar, arranger, producer
- Miguel Trujillo — executive producer
- Dennis F. Parker — engineer/mixer, mastering engineer
- Rigoberto Alfaro — arranger
- Manuel Cázarez — arranger
- Mara Esquivel — A&R
- Javier Alfaro — violin
- Dave Rivera — violin
- Javier Carrillo — violin
- Hugo Colula — violin
- Francisco Cedillo — viola
- Monica del Águila — cello
- Bernardino de Santiago — guitarrón
- Moisés García — trumpet

== See also ==
- Billboard Top Latin Songs Year-End Chart
