= Primera Fila (Vicente Fernández album) =

Live album by Vicente Fernández
- Released: 18 November 2008 (USA); 2 December 2008 (Mexico)
- Genre: Mariachi
- Label: Sony Music Latin
- Producer: Gustavo Borner

Vicente Fernández chronology
Canciones de sus Películas: El Arracadas (2008)	Primera Fila (2008)	Necesito de Tí (2009)

Singles from Primera Fila
- 1. "El Último Beso" Released: 28 December 2007

Professional ratings
Review scores
Source	Rating
Allmusic	4.5/5 stars

Primera Fila ("Front Row") is the title of a live album released by Mexican performer Vicente Fernández. This album is the 80th release by the performer, and became his third number-one set on the Billboard Top Latin Albums and the recipient of a Latin Grammy Award for Best Ranchero Album.

== Album history ==
After the success of Para Siempre, releases this album, which includes his greatest hits recorded live, with the participation of 30 musicians, in the "Vicente Fernández Gómez Arena". This unplugged CD and DVD also contains four songs never recorded before by Fernández: "Bésame Mucho", "Amor Mío", "No Vuelvo a Amar" and "Gracias". According to the record label Sony BMG, this is a live performance dedicated to the families, to see it in high definition and to be close to the idol. Primera Fila is the 80th album by the singer.

== Commercial release ==
=== Formats ===
This album was released in three different formats, CD/DVD and DVD/CD, and also in "Blu-ray", this last format as a collector's item. It was recorded in an "anti-pirate" system and in high definition, and in a near future will be released on 3D, to give the best quality for the fans, according to Miguel Trujillo, CEO of Sony Music México.

=== Album ===
A day after its release, Primera Fila it sold 80,000 units in Mexico, receiving a platinum certification. In the United States, according to the Billboard Top Latin Albums chart it debuted at number one, replacing 5to Piso by Guatemalan singer-songwriter Ricardo Arjona. In February 2009, this album was replaced by Para Siempre, Fernández' previous album, at the top of the Billboard Top Latin Albums chart, after seven consecutive weeks at number-one. The late Tex-Mex performer Selena was the only performer to achieve this feat, when Dreaming of You replaced her own Amor Prohibido at the top of the chart in 1995.

=== Singles ===
The first single released from this album is "El Ultimo Beso", written by Joan Sebastian and first included on Para Siempre. This song became the first number-one hit by Fernández in the Billboard Hot Latin Songs chart and became the oldest performer to peak at number-one on this chart.

== Track listing ==
No.	Title	Writer(s)	Length
1.	"El Rey (song)"	José Alfredo Jiménez	2:26
2.	"Mujeres Divinas"	Martín Urieta	3:03
3.	"La Diferencia"	Juan Gabriel	3:00
4.	"Urge"	Urieta	3:17
5.	"A Duras Penas"	Jorge Massias	2:47
6.	"Me Voy a Quitar de En Medio"	Manuel Monterrosas	3:19
7.	"La Ley del Monte"	José A. Espinoza "Ferrusquilla"	3:29
8.	"No Vuelvo a Amar"	Alfonso Esparza	3:43
9.	"Por un Amor"	Gilberto Parra	3:37
10.	"Amor Mío"	Álvaro Carrillo	3:28
11.	"Hermoso Cariño"	Fernando Maldonado	2:34
12.	"Acá Entre Nos"	Martín Urieta	3:40
13.	"Caminemos"	Alfredo Gil, Heriberto Martins	3:19
14.	"A Pesar de Todo"	Nelson Ned	3:41
15.	"Motivos"	Italo Piazzolante	3:31
16.	"El Último Beso"	Joan Sebastian	3:04
17.	"Bésame Mucho"	Consuelo Velázquez	4:04
18.	"Para Siempre"	Sebastian	3:12
19.	"Estos Celos"	Sebastian	4:52
20.	"Cruz de Olvido"	Juan Zaizar	4:25
21.	"Guadalajara"	Pepe Guízar	3:23
22.	"Gracias"	Jiménez	5:22

== Personnel ==
This information from Allmusic.

- Gustavo Borner – didjeridu, engineer, mastering, realization
- Pedro Ramírez – arranger, musical direction
- Josué "Ciclón" García – production assistant
- Juan Carlos Rodríguez – production assistant
- Justin Moshkevich – digital engineer
- Charlie Garcia – A&R
- Gilda Oropeza – A&R
- Miguel Trujillo – A&R
- Fernando Aceves – photography

== Charts ==
=== Weekly charts ===
Chart (2008)	Peak position
Mexico Albums (Top 100 Mexico)	1
US Billboard 200	92
US Top Latin Albums (Billboard)	1
US Regional Mexican Albums (Billboard)	1

=== Year-end charts ===
Chart (2009)	Position
US Top Latin Albums (Billboard)	4

== Sales and certifications ==
Region	Certification	Certified units/sales
Mexico (AMPROFON)	Diamond	400,000^{^}
United States (RIAA)	Platinum (Latin)	100,000^{^}
United States (RIAA) DVD	Platinum	100,000^{^}
^{^} Shipments figures based on certification alone.

== See also ==
- List of number-one albums of 2009 (Mexico)
- List of number-one Billboard Top Latin Albums of 2008
- List of number-one Billboard Top Latin Albums of 2009
