= Amandititita =

Mexican cumbia singer and songwriter

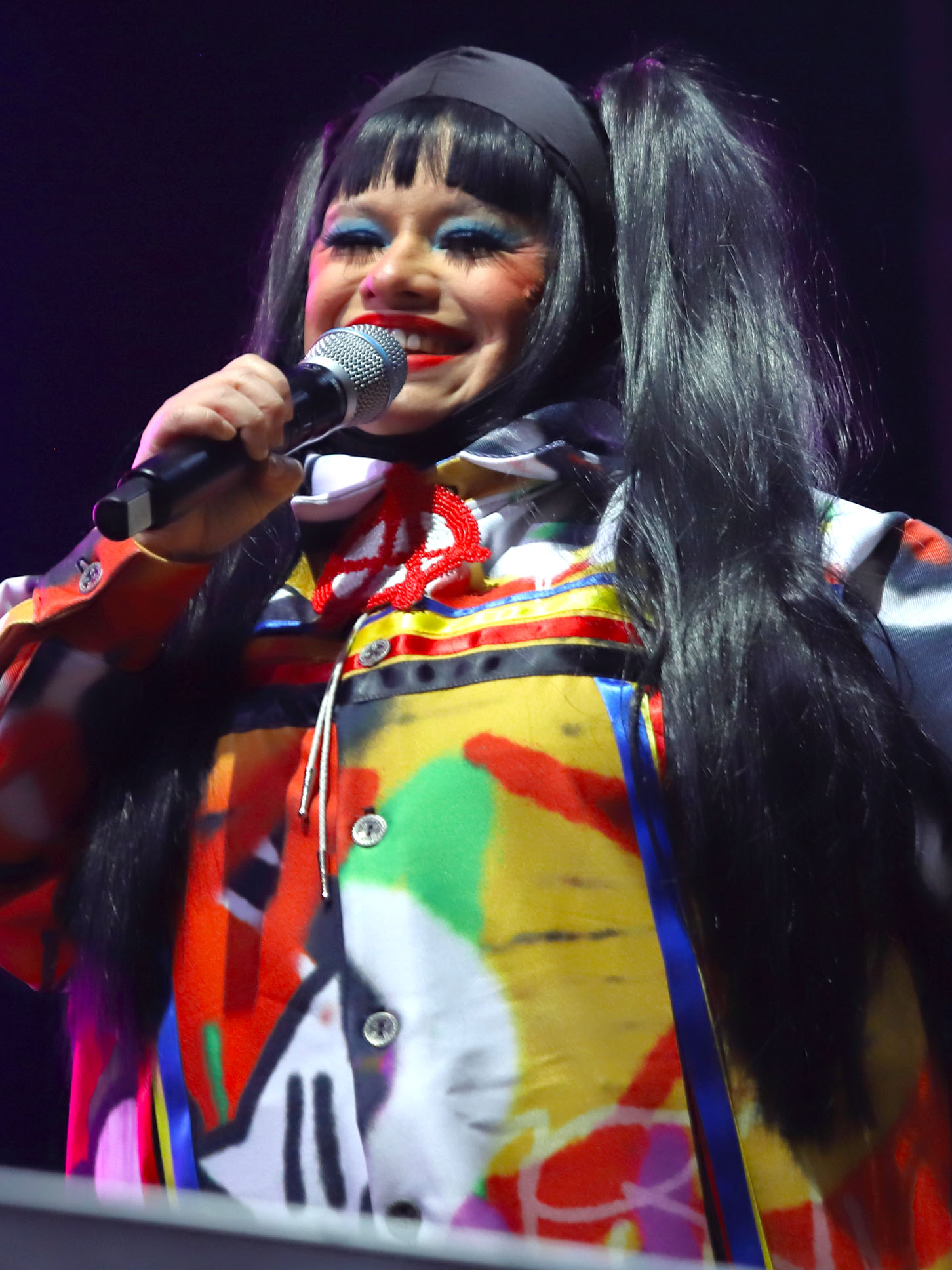

Background information
- Born: Amanda Lalena Escalante Pimentel; 3 August 1979 (age 47); Tampico, México
- Genres: Cumbia
- Occupations: Singer-songwriter, author.
- Instrument: Vocals
- Years active: 2007–present
- Labels: Sony-BMG, Kin Kon Records
- Website: MySpace site

Amandititita (Amanda Lalena Escalante Pimentel) is a Mexican cumbia singer and songwriter. She is the daughter of Rodrigo Gonzalez.

She came to public attention in 2007 as a performer of what she called 'AnarCumbia', a style said to be entirely urban and a blend of rock, reggae, rap, and traditional Mexican cumbia. She was signed by Sony-BMG and released her first album, La Reina de Anarcumbia, early in 2008. The single, La Muy Muy, from this album, charted on Billboard.

The release of her second album was announced for 27 October 2009; it was titled "La Descarada," with songs of a similar style to her first album. In late 2013, she released "Mala Fama," combining cumbia with modern pop. She also released her first book, 13 Latas de Atun (13 Tuna Cans). In 2015, Amandititita featured as a musical guest on the El Rey network's wrestling show Lucha Underground

== Discography ==
- La Reina de la Anarcumbia (2008)
- La Descarada (2009)
- Mala Fama (2013)
- Pinche Amor (2019)
