= Juan Gerardo Flores Ramírez =

Mexican politician

- Born: 31 July 1968 (age 57)
- Education: ITAM; University of Warwick
- Occupation: Senator
- Political party: PVEM

Juan Gerardo Flores Ramírez (born 31 July 1968) is a Mexican politician affiliated with the PVEM. He currently serves as Senator of the LXII Legislature of the Mexican Congress. He also served as Deputy during the LXI Legislature.
