= 100% Mexicano =

Studio album by Pepe Aguilar
- Released: September 18, 2007
- Genre: Regional Mexican
- Labels: Equinoccio, EMI-Televisa
- Producers: Pepe Aguilar, Fernando De Santiago

Pepe Aguilar chronology
| Pepe Aguilar En Vivo Live (2007) | 100% Mexicano (2007) | Juntos (2008) |

100% Mexicano is a studio album by Mexican-American performer Pepe Aguilar. It was released on September 18, 2007, by Equinoccio Records and distributed by EMI Televisa Music. Aguilar was awarded the Best Mexican/Mexican-American Album at the 50th Grammy Awards and received a nomination for Best Ranchero Album at the Latin Grammy Awards of 2008.

== Track listing ==
| No. | Title | Writer(s) | Length |
|---|---|---|---|
| 1. | "100% Mexicano" | Manuel Duran Duran | 3:20 |
| 2. | "Fruta Madura" | Martín Urieta | 4:24 |
| 3. | "Envidio" | Indalecio Ramírez | 3:34 |
| 4. | "Perdono y Olvido" | Leonel García | 5:03 |
| 5. | "De Vez en Cuando" | Marco Antonio Solís | 3:24 |
| 6. | "¿Es Esto el Amor?" | Miguel Luna | 3:36 |
| 7. | "Tú También Piensas en Mí" | Solís | 3:23 |
| 8. | "Balcón" | Luna | 3:39 |
| 9. | "Mi Corazón Reclama" | Reyli Barba | 3:26 |
| 10. | "Arráncame la Vida" | Manuel Eduardo Castro | 3:30 |

== Chart performance ==
| Chart (2007) | Peak position |
|---|---|
| US Billboard Top Latin Albums | 33 |
| US Billboard Regional Mexican Albums | 16 |

== Sales and certifications ==
| Region | Certification | Certified units/sales |
|---|---|---|
| Mexico (AMPROFON) | Gold | 50,000^{^} |
^{^} Shipments figures based on certification alone.
