= Juan Carlos Flores =

Cuban poet

Juan Carlos Flores (1962–2016) was a Cuban poet. Flores published a number of books in Cuba including his award-winning Los Pájaros Escritos. Flores was born in Havana in 1962 and committed suicide in September 2016.

== Biography ==
Juan Carlos Flores was born in Havana, Cuba, in 1962. In 1971, he moved to Alamar, a community built just to the east of Havana and considered one of the largest housing projects in the world. He originally lived in Zone 4, one of the first sections to be built, and later moved to Zone 6. In 2012, he travelled outside of Cuba for the first time to speak to Brown University students about his book, El contragolpe. Flores lived as an outsider in Cuba, holding no university degree or traditional job. As a writer, he was a well-known participant in the cosmopolitan literary culture of Havana. He was also a pioneering figure in the experimental poetry and performance activities that emerged in recent decades in his community.

At the moment of his death, he was working with a poetry and visual arts collective group based out of Alamar.

== Poetry ==
Juan Carlos Flores has been an influential figure in Cuban culture through his written works and experimental performances. His poetry is characterized by his fluid uses of repetition and often artistic minimalism. He composed all of his poems by hand, writing a colorful, slanting cursive across sheets of paper. Because of his stylized leanings, his poems are frequently selected for anthologies of the best contemporary Cuban poetry.

Inspired by his community, Flores was working on the third book in a trilogy to which he refers to as "the poetical resurrection of Alamar".

== Awards ==
In 1990, Flores won the David Prize for his first book of poems, Los pájaros escritos.

In 2002, Distintos Modos de Cavar un Túnel, the first book in the trilogy, won the Julián del Casals prize awarded by Cuba’s national union of artists and writers

== Other projects ==
In 1998, Flores founded Zona Franca, an alternative writer’s collective based in Alamar, with other artists. Later, they merged with a visual arts group called OMNI. Together they founded a progressive, collaborative project named OMNI-Zona Franca.

In 2009, Flores released a DVD with 35 poems and a soundtrack by Tony Carreras. It was directed by Garage 19 and produced by Miriam Real Arcia

== Published works ==
Los pájaros escritos (1994)

Distintos modos de cavar un túnel (2003)

Un hombre de la clase muerta (1986-2006)

El contragolpe (y otros poemas horizontales) (2009)

El trapiche (unpublished)
