= Premios Oye! =

Award for the Mexican record industry

- Awarded for: Outstanding achievements in the Mexican record industry market
- Country: Mexico
- Presented by: Academia Nacional de la Música en México
- First award: 2002
- Website: http://www.premiosoye.com.mx/

Premios Oye! (Premio Nacional a la Música Grabada) were presented annually by the Academia Nacional de la Música en México from 2003 to 2013 with the exception of 2011 when they were not presented, for outstanding achievements in the Mexican record industry. The televised awards ceremony featured performances by important national and international artists like Robbie Williams, Sarah Brightman, Shakira, Juanes, Paul McCartney and Lily Allen among others.

The awards were established in 2002 by the ANAMUSA (Academia Nacional de la Música) in order to reward composers, artists, record companies and every person who is involved in the music industry. This recognized the very best of musical production without counting the position where the artists charted in the Mexican Albums Chart.

The equivalent of Premios Oye! (Spanish, meaning "Listen! Awards") to the United States's Grammy Awards. It was telecast by Televisa in Mexico through its Canal de las Estrellas and on Univision in the US.

== Muse trophy ==
The trophy was created by the recognized Mexican plastic artist Jorge Marín, who previewed the award as a silhouette of a woman. In his own words, the female body was a perfect body which represented the triumph of its gender and reflected the victory of each winner.

The Muse consisted of an alloy with bronze and polished silver, creating a unique contrast that enhanced the aesthetic appeal of the trophy. The trophy consisted of a woman standing on the world, in her right hand holding the world of music and on the left, a lyre, which is the symbol of ANAMUSA. Bearing a naked torso and a rising sun on its head, this statue is a collector's item.

== Categories ==
The awards were divided into 3 groups: Pop and Rock, Anglo and Popular which includes physical and digital sales. El Consejo de la Comunicación gives an award called Premio Social a la Música to the song or artist that promotes positive values. Also the Academy dedicated a special tribute to the careers of Timbiriche, Marco Antonio Solís, Los Tigres del Norte and Miguel Bosé that was first awarded in 2008.

The 20 categories as 2008 were:

- Main Spanish:
- Spanish Record of the Year
- Spanish Song of the Year
- Spanish Breakthrough of the Year
- Latin Pop Spanish:
- Pop Male Solo Artist
- Pop Female Solo Artist
- Pop Group
- Pop Breakthrough
- Latin Rock Spanish:
- Rock Solo or Group
- Main English:
- English Record of the Year
- English Song of the Year
- English Breakthrough of the Year
- Main Popular:
- Popular Record of the Year
- Popular Song of the Year
- Popular Breakthrough of the Year
- Norteño Solo or Group
- Grupero Solo or Group
- Ranchero Solo or Group
- Banda/Duranguense Solo or Group
- Tropical Solo or Group
- Video of the Year
- Soundtrack Theme

It was expected that Electronica and Indie categories would be included soon due to success in recent years.

== Nomination Process ==
ANAMUSA and record companies are responsible for entering into nomination the works that they deem most deserving. Once a work is entered, reviewing sessions are held by experts selected from the academy. This is done only to determine whether or not a work is eligible or entered into the proper category for official nomination. Some of the rules of nomination process are: Live Records and Best Of are eligible for nominations if they contain at least 2 new records and only participate in Song of the Year according to its category (pop & rock, Anglo or popular). Any artist can be nominated in Breakthrough Artist of the Year (Artista Revelación del Año) national and international artists who have achieved significant success in Mexico for the first time with records released in the eligibility period.

As of 2008, the eligibility period for the Premios Oye! begins July 1 from the previous year to June 30 of the actual year. PricewaterhouseCoopers is in charge of tabulating the results of votes from more than 1,700 members of the jury in order to obtain five nominees or six in case of a tie. It is also responsible for publicizing the winners through sealed envelopes that will be open on the day of the final.

== Winners ==
155 Musas of Premio Oye! have been awarded to 95 artists in 9 years. To date Shakira and Alejandro Fernández has won the most awards, 9 and 8 respectively.

== Host cities ==
Edition	Year	Venue	Host city	Presenter
1st	2002	Auditorio Nacional	Mexico City	Benny Ibarra
2nd	2003	Auditorio Nacional	Mexico City	Adal Ramones
3rd	2004	Auditorio Nacional	Mexico City	Omar Chaparro, Javier Poza & Gloria Calzada
4th	2005	Zocalo de la Ciudad de México	Mexico City	Adal Ramones
5th	2006	Complejo Cultural Siglo XXI	Puebla, Puebla	Adal Ramones
6th	2007	World Trade Center Veracruz	Boca del Río, Veracruz	Yuri & Javier Poza
7th	2008	Foro Monumental	Zacatecas, Zacatecas	Jaqueline Bracamontes & Javier Poza
8th	2009	Auditorio del Estado	Guanajuato, Guanajuato	Yuri & Javier Poza
9th	2010	Auditorio Banamex	Monterrey, Nuevo León	Yuri & Javier Poza
10th	2012	Mazatlan International Center	Mazatlán, Sinaloa	Yuri & Alan Tacher
11th	2013	Mazatlan International Center	Mazatlán, Sinaloa	Montserrat Oliver & Alan Tacher
12th	2014	TBA	TBA	TBA

== Incidents ==
=== Ban controversy and Yahir's 'Breakthrough of the Year' win (2003) ===
Since Televisa is responsible for the show, that year Nadia and Yahir were nominated for Breakthrough artists in Popular and Spanish respectively and since the artists were alumni from TV Azteca's project La Academia, some media expected the banning of the moments from Televisa since they were promoting their competitor. However, there was no banning from the first winner, Nadia who was congratulated by the host, Adal Ramones. But the controversy came when Yahir won Breakthrough of the Year because he thanked TV Azteca in a live show transmitted in Televisa Network.

=== Angélica Rivera ===
Some prominent media figures disagreed with the presentation of an award to Angélica Rivera because they said she was an actress, not a singer and the other nominees had more seniority in the music field. They contended that the award was given to her primarily because the show was on Televisa and her telenovela was very successful at the time. However she has a musical background since 90's when she sang in Muñecos de Papel alongside Ricky Martin and Sasha Sokol
