= Vicente Fernández =

Mexican actor and ranchera singer (1940–2021)

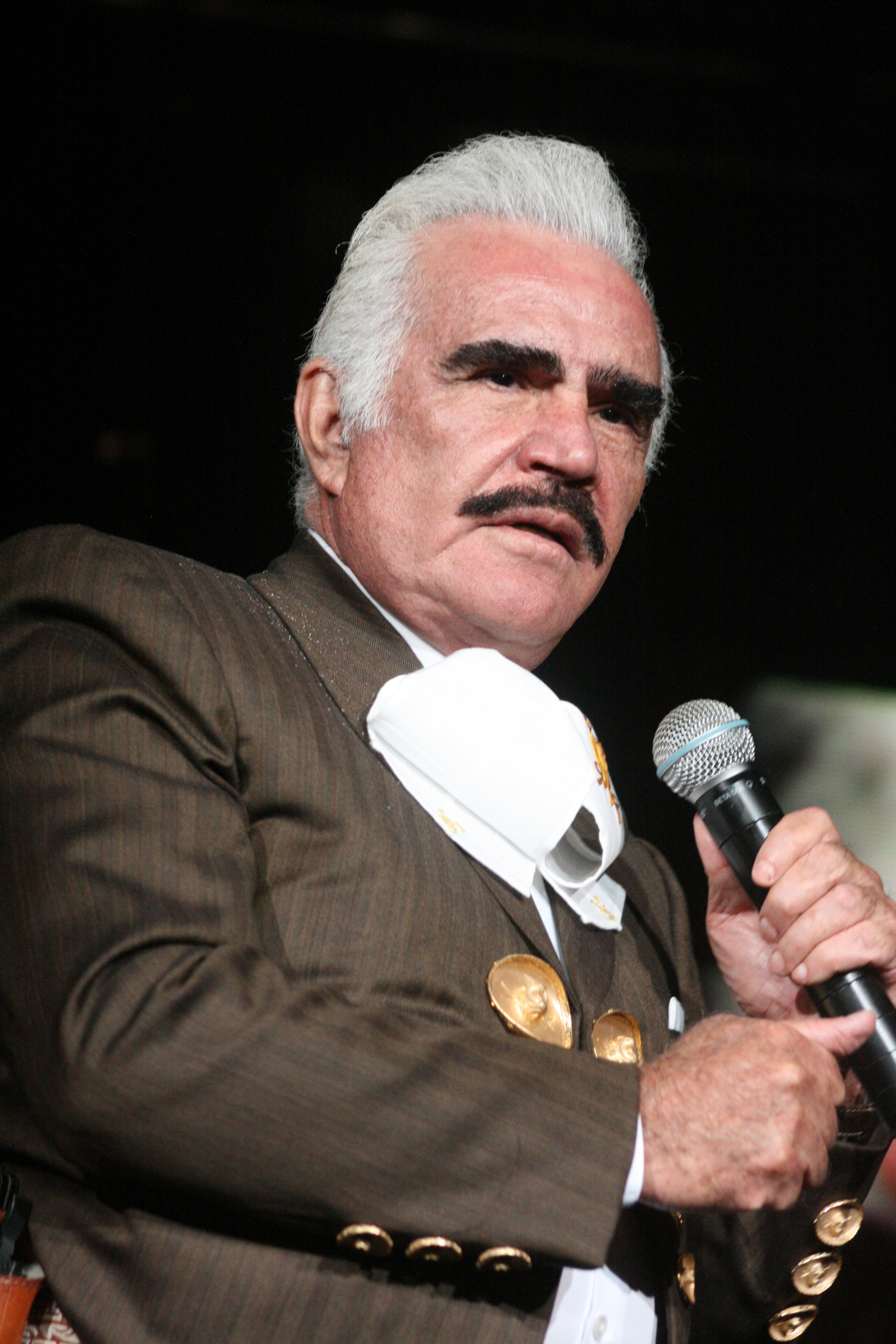
- Fernández at Pepsi Center (2011)
- Born: Vicente Fernández Gómez; 17 February 1940; Guadalajara, Jalisco, Mexico
- Died: 12 December 2021 (aged 81); Guadalajara, Jalisco, Mexico
- Burial place: Rancho Los Tres Potrillos, Tlajomulco de Zúñiga, Jalisco, Mexico
- Other names: La Voz de México; La Voz de América Latina; El Charro de Huentitán; Chente; El Ídolo de México; El Rey de la Música Ranchera; El Sinatra de la Música Ranchera
- Occupations: Singer; actor; film producer
- Years active: 1966–2020
- Spouse: María del Refugio Abarca (m. 1963)
- Children: 4, including Alejandro
- Musical career
- Genres: Regional Mexican music; canción ranchera; mariachi
- Instrument: Vocals
- Label: Sony Mexico

Signature
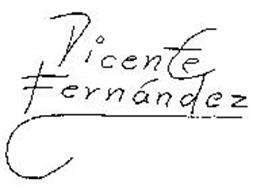

Vicente Fernández Gómez (17 February 1940 – 12 December 2021) was a Mexican mariachi singer, actor, and film producer. Nicknamed "Chente" (short for Vicente), "El Charro de Huentitán" (The Charro from Huentitán), "El Ídolo de México" (The Idol of Mexico), and "El Rey de la Música Ranchera" (The King of Ranchera Music), Fernández started his career as a busker, and went on to become a cultural icon, having recorded more than 100 albums and contributing to more than 150 films. His repertoire consisted of rancheras and other Mexican classics such as waltzes.

Fernández's work earned him four Grammy Awards, nine Latin Grammy Awards, fourteen Lo Nuestro Awards, and a star on the Hollywood Walk of Fame. He sold over 50 million copies worldwide, making him one of the best-selling regional Mexican artists of all time. In 2016, Fernández retired from performing live, although he continued to record and publish music. In 2023, Rolling Stone named Fernández the greatest Mexican singer of all time and the 95th greatest overall with their "200 Greatest Singers of All Time" list.

== Early life ==
Vicente Fernández was born on the 17 of February 1940 in the village of Huentitán El Alto, Jalisco, the son of a rancher and a housewife. When he was between 6 and 7 years old, he used to go with his mother to see movies starring Pedro Infante and Jorge Negrete and, as he himself once recalled, he told his mother that "when I grow up I'm going to be like them". Thereafter he had a taste for music and at the age of 8 he was given a guitar, which he learned to play at the same time he began to study folk music.

Fernández's family found it difficult to support themselves by selling milk from the cows on their ranch, so after Fernández finished elementary school, he and his family moved to Tijuana. Once a teenager, Fernández began working various jobs, including as a bricklayer, painter, and cabinetmaker. During his working day he sang, so many construction companies asked to have him as a worker. After these jobs he was hired to work as a cashier in his uncle's restaurant. At the age of 14 he started singing in restaurants and at weddings, joining several mariachi groups such as Mariachi Amanecer de Pepe Mendoza and Mariachi de José Luis Aguilar. It was then when, in Jalisco, he participated in the radio program Amanecer Tapatío, and began to be recognized locally. At the age of 21 he appeared on the television show La calandria musical. It was his first paid show.

On 27 December 1963 he married Maria del Refugio Abarca Villaseñor, with whom he had his first son, Vicente, who was born premature and had to be incubated at home because Fernández could not pay the hospital. That year, his 47-year-old mother died of cancer.

In 1965 he moved to Mexico City to seek a future in the world of music. His first attempts with the record companies were unsuccessful due to the popularity of singer Javier Solís. There he arranged to sing in a program of the radio network XEX-AM, which at that time was the most important in the country. A few days after the premature death of Solís in April 1966, Fernández received his first offers for albums. His first contract was with CBS Records of Mexico, the recording label in the Mexican department of CBS Records International, for whom he recorded albums such as Soy de Abajo, Ni en Defensa Propia, and Palabra de rey. Some of Fernández's songs such as "Tu Camino y El Mío" and "Perdóname" were very successful.

== Career ==
=== 1970s and 1980s: Volver volver and Fernández's success ===
Fernández had to wait a decade to consolidate his career. With the death in 1973 of José Alfredo Jiménez, one of the great icons of rancheras, Fernández became a reference point in the music industry. His next album was La voz que estabas esperando and the following albums, titled El rey, El hijo del pueblo, and Para recordar, sold millions of copies.

In 1976, with the song Volver Volver, written in 1972 by Fernando Z. Maldonado, his fame was catapulted throughout the country and the American continent based on the sales of this recording. That song came to be covered by more than twenty singers, including Chavela Vargas, Ry Cooder, and Nana Mouskouri.

In the 1980s the style of Fernández's songs changed from bolero ranchero to a ranchera focused on migration. In fact, the song Los Mandados was a reference to those Mexicans migrating to the United States and reproduced macho and patriotic stereotypes. These were the years in which he built his ranch "Los 3 Potrillos", which would end up being his music production center. In 1983 he released his album 15 Grandes con el Numero Uno, which was the first to exceed one million copies sold. In 1984 he gave a concert at the Plaza de Toros México, which was attended by 54,000 people.

In 1987 he launched his first tour outside the United States and Mexico when he traveled to Bolivia and Colombia.

=== 1990s: Fernández at his musical peak ===
The U.S. press in 1991 was already talking about Fernández as the "Mexican Sinatra" and he released ranchera classics such as Las clásicas de José Alfredo Jiménez (1990), Lástima que seas ajena (1993), Aunque me duela el alma (1995), Mujeres divinas, Acá entre nos, Me voy a quitar de en medio (1998), and La mentira (1998), which all became classics.

In 1998 his elder son Vicente Jr. was kidnapped by the "Mocha Dedos", who demanded 5 million dollars as ransom. After Fernández Sr. paid $3.2 million to free him Vicente Jr. was abandoned outside the family ranch 121 days later with two of his fingers having been amputated. Fernández did all this without going to the police; both he and his other son Alejandro continued to perform concerts to maintain the appearance of normalcy to the public. In 2008 the kidnappers were sentenced to 50 years in prison.

=== 2001 and 2011: Later years ===
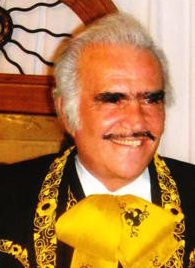
Fernández, c. 2008

In 2001 he launched the Lazos Invencibles tour, together with his son Alejandro. In 2006 Vicente Fernandez released the album La tragedia del vaquero, which was certified platinum in the United States.

He won a Latin Grammy again in 2008 with the album Para Siempre which was released in 2007. In 2008 he released Primera Fila, which was certified double platinum in Mexico, platinum in Central America, platinum in Colombia, and double platinum plus gold in the United States. The album remained seven consecutive weeks at number one on Billboard, and led him to win another Latin Grammy for Best Ranchero Album.

The concert he performed at the Zócalo in Mexico City on 14 February 2009 broke attendance records, with almost 220,000 people gathered to hear him. That same year he released the album Necesito de ti, which won a Grammy and a Latin Grammy the following year. In September 2010 the album El Hombre Que Más Te Amó was released, produced by Vicente himself, for which he won a Latin Grammy again. He released Otra vez, also produced by him, in November 2011.

After the 2010 Haiti earthquake, Fernández was one of the 50 Latin singers who participated in the charity song "Somos El Mundo 25 Por Haiti", a cover version of "We Are the World".

Fernández started off the opening ceremony of the 2011 Pan American Games, hosted by Guadalajara, and sang "México Lindo y Querido" and "Guadalajara"; later in the ceremony he sang the Mexican national anthem before the parade of the athletes' delegations, while his son Alejandro closed the ceremony performing the games' theme song "El Mismo Sol". In October 2011, taking advantage of his U.S. tour, he signed a three-year agreement with Budweiser for the second time to promote scholarships for Hispanic American students through the Hispanic Scholarship Fund.

=== 2012–2021: Retirement from stage ===
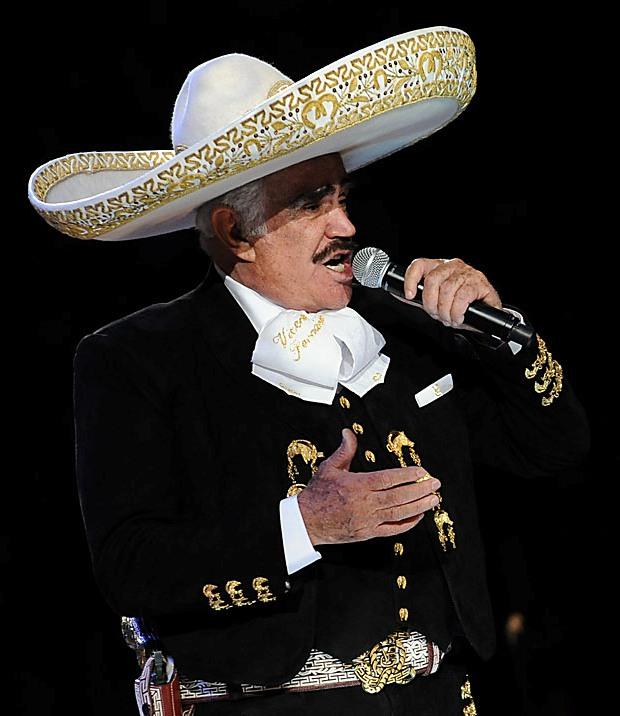
Fernández performing at Estadio Azteca in Un Azteca En El Azteca retirement show in 2013

On 8 February 2012, he announced in a press conference, surprisingly, his intention to retire from the stage, but he specified that he would continue recording albums and that it was not for health reasons but because it was time to enjoy his work. Two months later, in the middle of a farewell tour throughout the country and Latin America, he released the album Los 2 Vicentes, together with his son Vicente Jr.; the album included the theme song of the telenovela Amor bravío.

That same year he recorded, together with Tony Bennett, "Return to me" at his ranch in Guadalajara for Bennett's album Viva Duets, in which Bennett sang in Spanish. In a later interview, Bennett said that Fernández had been "his favorite". In 2012 he also released the album Hoy and won again a Latin Grammy Award in the 2013 edition. This was followed by the albums Mano a mano, tangos a la manera de Vicente Fernández, in 2014 (for which he won his second Grammy for Best Regional Mexican Album and was nominated for a Latin Grammy for Best Ranchera Album), and "Muriendo de amor", in 2015.

On 28 November 2013, Fernández presented his book entitled Pero sigo siendo el rey in which he collects anecdotes and more than two hundred unpublished photographs about his professional career.

The farewell concert, titled "Un azteca en el Azteca" (An Aztec in the Aztec), took place on April 16, 2016, at the Estadio Azteca, in front of more than 80,000 people; admission was free. He sang more than 40 songs over more than four hours, the longest concert of his professional career. He only had one special guest, his son Alejandro. The concert was collected on an album, with the same name, for which Fernández won the Grammy Award for Best Regional Mexican Music Album in 2017.

Despite retiring from the stage, he continued recording albums and songs, such as the album Más romántico que nunca in 2018 and A mis 80s in 2020, which earned him his ninth Latin Grammy Award for best ranchera album in 2021.

In his 50-year career he sold more than 65 million records and recorded more than 80 albums and more than 300 songs.

=== Acting career ===
Fernandez's debut in the movies was in 1971 with the film Tacos al carbón. He starred in his first film in La ley del monte in 1976. During the 20 years he dedicated to acting, he starred in 30 films, 18 of which were under the direction of Rafael Villaseñor Kuri, and shared the stage with nationally renowned actors such as Blanca Guerra, Sara García, Fernando Soto, Resortes, and Lucía Méndez. In films such as Por tu maldito amor, La ley del monte, El hijo del pueblo, and Mi querido viejo, he introduced his music, so the title of the film reflected the title of the song introduced. His main role was that of the stereotypical Mexican "macho" and "gallant" man.

As a film producer he debuted in 1974 with the film El hijo del pueblo. His last film was Mi querido viejo, in 1991, and thereafter he devoted himself exclusively to music.

== Personal life ==
=== Family ===
Fernández married María del Refugio Abarca "Cuquita" on 27 December 1963, the sister of a close friend of his whom he met in his hometown. Three children were born from the marriage, Vicente Jr., Gerardo, and Alejandro and a fourth, Alejandra, is his niece, whom they adopted. From their children they had 11 grandchildren and 5 great-grandchildren. Throughout his life he was accused by several persons of being unfaithful, which he always rejected. In addition to his biological children, he was also the godfather of Pedro Fernández.

With his sons Alejandro and Vicente Jr, both singers, Vicente went on stage to sing with them on several occasions. The last time he went on stage was to sing with his son Alejandro, and to promote the musical career of one of his grandsons, Alex, in 2019.

On the day of his death, his fortune was valued at $25 million.

=== Image ===
Fernandez was considered, along with Pedro Infante, Jorge Negrete and Javier Solis, the archetype of the Mexican male, which he somewhat downplayed by calling himself a "ranchman" (hombre de rancho). Nevertheless his commonly known stance of closeness to his audience also bolstered a feeling of endearment among many of his fans which continued until his death.

=== Health issues ===
Fernandez suffered from cancer on two occasions: in 2002 he overcame prostate cancer and in 2012 he had a tumor removed from his liver. In 2013 he suffered a thrombosis that caused him to lose his voice temporarily and in 2015 he underwent surgery to remove abdominal hernias. He had chosen to refuse a liver transplant in 2012. In 2021 he was admitted to the hospital for two days to be treated for a urinary tract infection and was diagnosed with Guillain-Barré syndrome.

=== Politics ===
Fernández was long associated with the Partido Revolucionario Institucional (PRI), which governed Mexico from 1929 to 2000 and again between 2012 and 2018. Fernández was one of the many performers who participated in the "Solidaridad" campaign during the administration of Carlos Salinas de Gortari in the 1980s, and has also performed at PRI rallies, attended PRI events or met with politicians from that party; on one occasion, he performed the song "Estos celos" for then-President Enrique Peña Nieto (a PRI member) during an official celebration.

He was invited at the U.S. 2000 Republican National Convention in Philadelphia to sing the famous "Cielito lindo".

On 16 April 2016, at the end of his farewell concert, he cried out that he would "spit on" the then Republican Party primary candidate for the U.S. presidential election Donald Trump for his anti-immigrant rhetoric. Fernández, later that year, expressed his support for Hillary Clinton with a song titled "El Corrido de Hillary Clinton". Following the last debate between Clinton and Trump, Clinton invited Fernández to the celebration at the Craig Ranch Regional Park Amphitheater, Las Vegas, U.S.

=== Controversies ===
In January 2021, Fernández sparked controversy after placing his hand on a fan's breast while taking a picture with her family. A few days later, Fernández issued an apology to the woman's family, stating that "I admit that I was wrong, I don't know if I was joking, maybe it was a joke [...] I don't know. I do not remember, there were many people (with whom I took photos), sincerely I offer an apology".

In February 2021, Fernández was accused of sexual assault by a singer named Lupita Castro. Castro alleged that the incident had happened 40 years prior, when she was 17, and that she had kept her silence because of his influence and because of his threats of violence against her. Castro refused to go to court against Fernández.

== Death ==
Fernández was hospitalized in serious condition after falling at his ranch in Guadalajara on 6 August 2021. He had injured his cervical spine and was placed on a ventilator under the intensive care unit. Two weeks later, he was diagnosed with Guillain–Barré syndrome and began treatment on 13 August. His son Vicente Jr. confirmed to the press that it was a disease that had nothing to do with the fall he suffered. On 26 October 2021, he left intensive care following an improvement in his clinical condition. On 30 November 2021, he was again admitted to intensive care following a complication of his health caused by pneumonia. On 11 December, his son again reported in an interview that his father was sedated due to a worsening of his condition.

Fernández died of complications from his injuries on 12 December 2021, at the age of 81. President of Mexico Andrés Manuel López Obrador mourned his death with a tweet in which he recognized Fernández as the "symbol of the ranchera song of our time, known and recognized in Mexico and abroad". The Colombian president, Iván Duque, said "his departure hurts us and his legacy will be alive forever", and the U.S President, Joe Biden, said that "the world of music has lost an icon". Also on Twitter, other leaders including the President of Venezuela, Nicolás Maduro, the Mayor of Mexico City, Claudia Sheinbaum, the former President of Colombia Álvaro Uribe, and of Bolivia Evo Morales as well as numerous Mexican and Latin American entertainment personalities offered their condolences. Former U.S. Secretary of State Hillary Clinton recognized Fernandez as "a musical icon and a good man". He died on the day of Our Lady of Guadalupe, patron saint of Mexico, to whom Fernández had a great devotion.

Fernández's body was transferred from the funeral home to the Arena VFG, which the artist had donated to his hometown of Guadalajara, where his family and at least six thousand fans were already waiting for him. Songs including "El Rey" and "Acá Entre Nos" were performed by his Mariachi Azteca. There, the coffin with his remains was placed, in the middle of the stage that was turned into an altar with a large crucifix presiding over the scene and on one side an image of the Our Lady of Guadalupe accompanied the coffin. On the coffin, which was surrounded by a sea of white flowers, rested his favorite sombrero.

The following day, the Catholic funeral took place at the same arena. The ceremony was alternated by songs of his most famous rancheras and ended with "Volver Volver", as he had wished, live. Afterwards, his body was taken to his ranch, where he was buried in a mausoleum.

== Awards and nominations ==
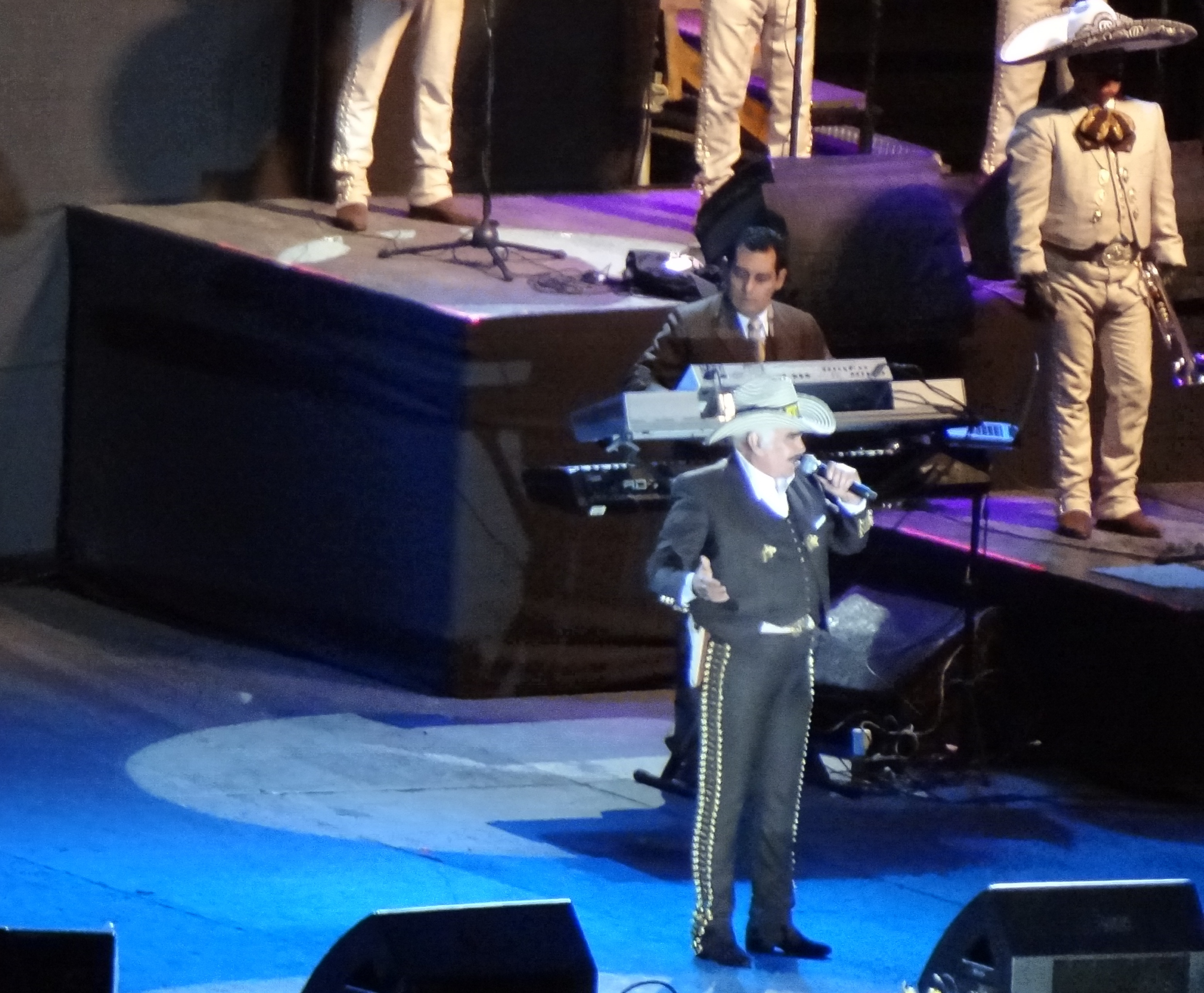
Fernández at a concert in Colombia, 2012

In 1990, Fernández released the album Vicente Fernandez y las clásicas de José Alfredo Jiménez, a tribute to Mexico's famous songwriter from Guanajuato known as The "God of Ranchera Music" José Alfredo Jiménez, who was also his main musical influence. The album earned him Billboard and Univision's Latin Music Award for Mexican Regional Male Artist of the Year, which he won five times from 1989 to 1993.

In 1998, Fernández was inducted into Billboard's Latin Music Hall of Fame. On 11 November 1998 his star on the Hollywood Walk of Fame was unveiled.

In 2002, the Latin Recording Academy recognized Fernández as Person of the Year. That year he celebrated his 35th anniversary in the entertainment industry, a career in which he sold more than 50 million records and was inducted into the International Latin Music Hall of Fame. He has 51 albums listed on the Recording Industry Association of America (RIAA) for gold, platinum, and multiplatinum-selling records.

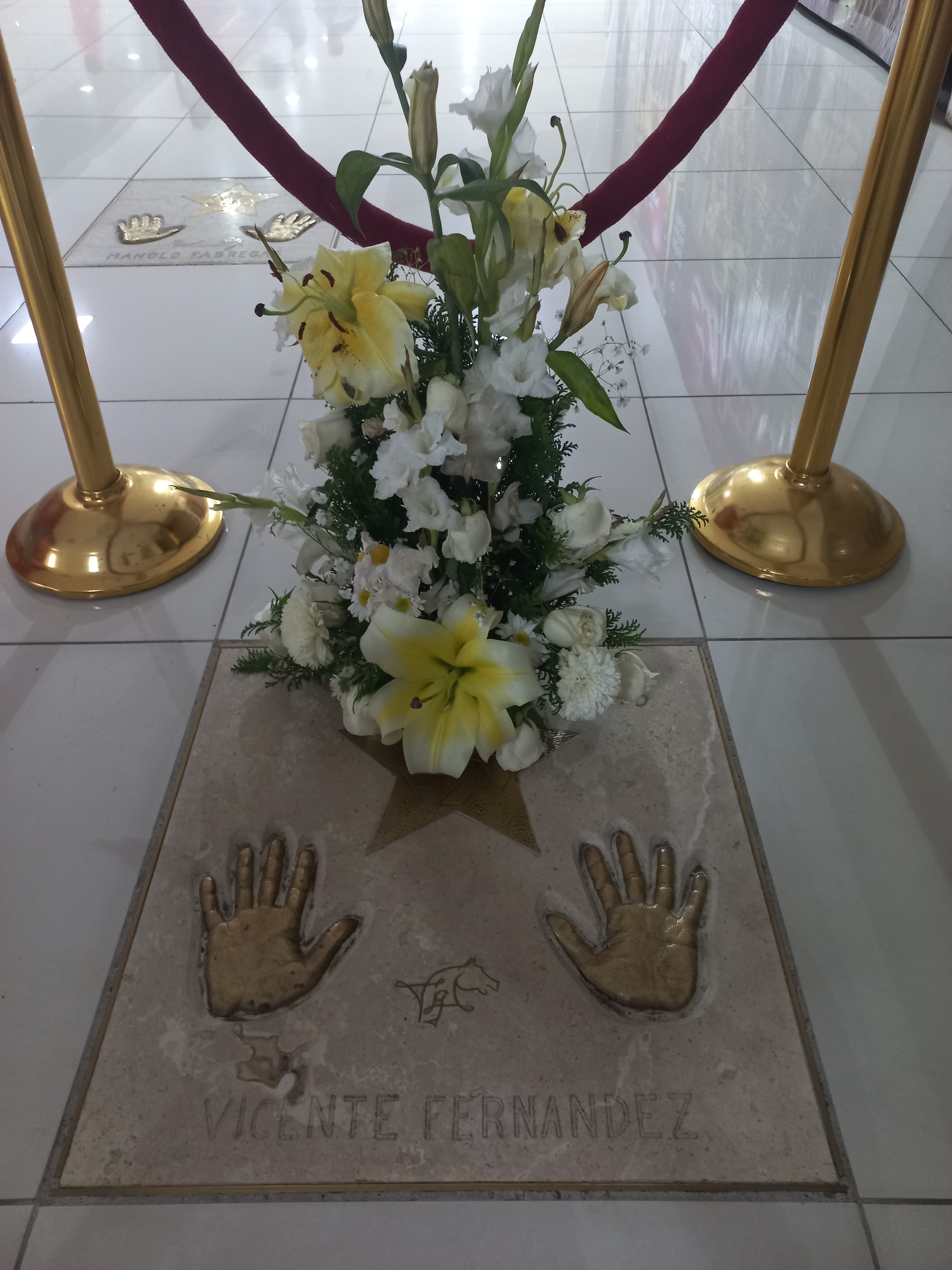
Fernández's handprints and star at the Paseo de las Luminarias (Plaza de las Estrellas) in Mexico City

Fernández also has an arena in Guadalajara named in his honor built in 2005 by his company, and a star placed with his hand prints and name at the Paseo de las Luminarias in Mexico City. Governor of New Mexico Bill Richardson on 16 July 2008 declared 12 June as Vicente Fernández Day in the state. In 2010, Fernández was awarded his first Grammy Award for Best Regional Mexican Album for his record Necesito de Tí.

In 2012, Chicago gave Fernández the key to the city and renamed the Little Village neighborhood's West 26th Street in his honor. In addition, the city celebrates "Vicente Fernandez Week" from 20 to 27 October.

On 6 October 2019 in Guadalajara, Fernández unveiled a statue created in his honor at the "Plaza de los Mariachis".

=== Grammy Awards ===
The Grammy Awards are awarded annually by the National Academy of Recording Arts and Sciences of the United States. Fernández received four awards from fourteen nominations.

| Year | Nominee / work | Award | Result |
|---|---|---|---|
| 1984 | ...Es La Diferencia | Best Mexican-American Performance | Nominated |
| 1991 | Las Clásicas de José Alfredo Jiménez | Best Mexican-American Performance | Nominated |
| 1994 | Lástima Que Seas Ajena | Best Mexican-American Album | Nominated |
| 1995 | Recordando a Los Panchos | Best Mexican-American Performance, Vocal or Instrumental | Nominated |
| 1997 | Vicente Fernández y sus Canciones | Best Mexican-American/Tejano Music Performance | Nominated |
| 1999 | Entre El Amor y Yo | Best Mexican-American Music Performance | Nominated |
| 2000 | Vicente Fernández y los Más Grandes Éxitos de Los Dandys | Best Mexican-American Music Performance | Nominated |
| 2001 | Lobo Herido | Best Mexican-American Music Performance | Nominated |
| 2002 | Más Con el Número Uno | Best Mexican/Mexican-American Album | Nominated |
| 2008 | Para Siempre | Best Mexican/Mexican-American Album | Nominated |
| 2010 | Necesito de Tí | Best Regional Mexican Album | Won |
| 2015 | Mano a Mano – Tangos a la Manera de Vicente Fernández | Best Regional Mexican Music Album (including Tejano) | Won |
| 2017 | Un Azteca En El Azteca, Vol. 1 (En Vivo) | Best Regional Mexican Music Album (including Tejano) | Won |
| 2022 | A Mis 80's | Best Regional Mexican Music Album (including Tejano) | Won |

^{^[I]} Each year is linked to the article about the Grammy Awards held that year.

==== A Mis 80's ====
A Mis 80's is a 2022 Grammy Award-winning album under Best Regional Mexican Music Album category by Vicente Fernández.

=== Latin Grammy Awards ===
The Latin Grammy Awards are awarded annually by the Latin Academy of Recording Arts & Sciences of the United States. Fernández received eight awards from fourteen nominations and also earned the Latin Recording Academy for Person of the Year.

| Year | Nominee / work | Award | Result |
|---|---|---|---|
| 2000 | Vicente Fernández y los Más Grandes Éxitos de Los Dandys | Best Ranchero Album | Nominated |
| 2002 | Más Con El Número Uno | Best Ranchero Album | Won |
| 2003 | 35 Aniversario – Lo Mejor de Lara | Best Ranchero Album | Won |
| 2004 | En Vivo Juntos Por Ultima Vez (shared with Alejandro Fernández) | Best Ranchero Album | Won |
| 2004 | Se Me Hizo Tarde la Vida | Best Ranchero Album | Nominated |
| 2005 | Vicente Fernández y Sus Corridos Consentidos | Best Ranchero Album | Nominated |
| 2007 | La Tragedia del Vaquero | Best Ranchero Album | Nominated |
| 2008 | Para Siempre | Best Ranchero Album | Won |
| 2008 | Para Siempre | Album of the Year | Nominated |
| 2009 | Primera Fila | Best Ranchero Album | Won |
| 2010 | Necesito de Ti | Best Ranchero Album | Won |
| 2011 | El Hombre Que Más Te Amó | Best Ranchero Album | Won |
| 2013 | Hoy | Best Ranchero Album | Won |
| 2014 | Mano a Mano – Tangos a la Manera de Vicente Fernández | Best Ranchero Album | Nominated |
| 2021 | A mis 80's | Best Ranchero Album | Won |

^{^[I]} Each year is linked to the article about the Latin Grammy Awards held that year.

=== Lo Nuestro Awards ===
The Lo Nuestro Awards is an awards show honoring the best of Latin music, presented by television network Univision. Fernández received fourteen awards from thirty-three nominations.

| Year | Nominee / work | Award | Result |
|---|---|---|---|
| 1989 | Himself | Regional Mexican Artist | Won |
| 1989 | El Cuatrero | Regional Mexican Album of the Year | Nominated |
| 1989 | "Dos Corazones" (shared with Vikki Carr) | Regional Mexican Song of the Year | Nominated |
| 1990 | Himself | Regional Mexican Artist | Won |
| 1990 | Por Tu Maldito Amor | Regional Mexican Album of the Year | Nominated |
| 1990 | "Por Tu Maldito Amor" | Regional Mexican Song of the Year | Won |
| 1990 | "Mujeres Divinas" | Regional Mexican Song of the Year | Nominated |
| 1991 | Himself | Regional Mexican Artist | Won |
| 1991 | "Amor De Los Dos" (shared with Alejandro Fernández) | Regional Mexican Song of the Year | Nominated |
| 1992 | Himself | Regional Mexican Male Artist of the Year | Won |
| 1992 | Arriba el Norte y Arriba el Sur (shared with Ramón Ayala | Regional Mexican Album of the Year | Nominated |
| 1992 | "Que Sepan Todos" | Regional Mexican Song of the Year | Nominated |
| 1993 | Himself | Regional Mexican Male Artist | Won |
| 1993 | Qué De Raro Tiene | Regional Mexican Album of the Year | Nominated |
| 1996 | Himself | Regional Mexican Male Artist | Nominated |
| 1996 | Aunque Me Duela el Alma | Regional Mexican Album of the Year | Nominated |
| 1998 | "Nos Estorbó la Ropa" | Regional Mexican Song of the Year | Nominated |
| 1999 | "Me Voy a Quitar de En Medio" | Regional Mexican Song of the Year | Nominated |
| 2000 | Himself | Regional Mexican Male Artist | Nominated |
| 2001 | Himself | Regional Mexican Male Artist | Nominated |
| 2001 | Himself | Ranchera Performance | Nominated |
| 2001 | Lobo Herido | Regional Mexican Album of the Year | Nominated |
| 2002 | Himself | Regional Mexican Male Artist | Nominated |
| 2002 | Himself | Ranchera Performance | Nominated |
| 2003 | Himself | People's Internet Choice Award: Regional Mexican | Won |
| 2003 | Himself | Ranchera Performance | Won |
| 2004 | Himself | Ranchera Performance | Nominated |
| 2005 | Himself | Ranchera Performance | Nominated |
| 2006 | Himself | Ranchera Performance | Won |
| 2007 | Himself | Ranchera Performance | Won |
| 2008 | Himself | Regional Mexican Male Artist | Nominated |
| 2008 | Himself | Excellence Award | Won |
| 2009 | Himself | Regional Mexican Male Artist | Won |
| 2009 | Himself | Ranchera Performance | Won |
| 2010 | Himself | Artist of the Year | Nominated |
| 2010 | Himself | Ranchera Performance | Won |
| 2010 | Himself | Regional Mexican Male Artist | Nominated |
| 2010 | "El Último Beso" | Regional Mexican Song of the Year | Nominated |
| 2012 | Himself | Ranchera Performance | Nominated |
| 2013 | Himself | Ranchera Performance | Nominated |
| 2014 | Himself | Ranchera Performance | Won |

^{^[I]} Each year is linked to the article about the Lo Nuestro Awards held that year.

=== Honours ===
- Orden Libertadores y Libertadoras de Venezuela (Venezuela, 2012)

== Filmography ==
Sources:

- 1991: Mí Querido Viejo (My Dear Old Man)
- 1990: Por Tu Maldito Amor (For Your Damned Love)
- 1989: El Cuatrero (The Rustler)
- 1987: El Diablo, el Santo y el Tonto (The Devil, the Saint, and the Fool)
- 1987: El Macho (The Tough One)
- 1987: El Embustero (The Liar)
- 1985: Entre Compadres Te Veas (You Find Yourself Among Friends)
- 1985: Sinvergüenza Pero Honrado (Shameless But Honorable)
- 1985: Acorralado (Cornered)
- 1985: Matar o Morir (Kill or Die)
- 1983: Un Hombre Llamado el Diablo (A Man Called the Devil)
- 1982: Juan Charrasqueado & Gabino Barrera
- 1981: Una Pura y Dos Con Sal (One Pure and Two with Salt)
- 1981: El Sinvergüenza (The Shameless One)
- 1981: Todo un Hombre (Fully Manly)
- 1980: Como Mexico no Hay Dos (Like Mexico There Is No Other)
- 1980: Picardia Mexicana Numero Dos (Mexican Rogueishness Number Two)
- 1980: Coyote and Bronca (The Coyote and the Problem)
- 1979: El Tahúr (The Gambler)
- 1977: Picardia Mexicana (Mexican Rogueishness)
- 1977: El Arracadas (The Earringer)
- 1975: Dios Los Cría (God Raises Them)
- 1974: Juan Armenta: El Repatriado (Juan Armenta: The Repatriated One)
- 1974: El Albañil (The Bricklayer)
- 1974: La Ley del Monte (The Law of Wild)
- 1974: Entre Monjas Anda el Diablo (The Devil Walks Between Nuns)
- 1974: El Hijo del Pueblo (Son of the People)
- 1973: Tu Camino y el Mío (Your Road and Mine)
- 1973: Uno y Medio Contra el Mundo (One and a Half Against the World)
- 1971: Tacos Al Carbón (Grilled Tacos)

== See also ==
- List of best-selling Latin music artists
