= Flex discography =

- Studio albums: 3
- Extended plays: 1
- Singles: 10
- Music videos: 9
- Featured singles: 1

The discography of Panamanian reggaeton singer Flex consists of three studio albums, eight solo singles, one featured single and one EP; collaborations are also included.

Flex released his debut album Te Quiero: Romantic Style In Da World in 2007, with the U.S. Billboard Hot Latin no. 1 debut single "Te Quiero". It reached number no. 1 in many countries, making his first single to enter on US Billboard Hot 100 at no. 86. A remix with Belinda was released later for the album's fan edition. It was released with two other singles, "Escápate" and "Sin Tu Amor". Later, Flex collaborated on Kumbia All Starz' song "Por Ti Baby". In 2009, Flex released his second album La Evolución Romantic Style with his second U.S. Billboard Hot Latin no. 1 single, "Dime Si Te Vas Con Él" followed by "Te Amo Tanto".

In March 2010, Flex released his third album Romantic Style Parte 3: Desde La Esencia. The album features the single "Besos de Amor" featuring Kumbia All Starz member Ricky Rick.

== Albums ==
Year	Album	Chart positions				Certifications (sales threshold)	Sales
Year	Album	^{US}	^{US Latin}	^{ARG}	^{MEX}	Certifications (sales threshold)	Sales
2007	Te Quiero: Romantic Style In Da World: Released: September 21, 2007 (MX), December 4, 2007 (US); Formats: CD, digital download	70	1	15	1	MEX: 2× Platinum	Worldwide: 1,200,000; US: 236,000
2009	La Evolución Romantic Style: Released: January 27, 2009; Formats: CD, digital download	104	3	1	46		Worldwide: 700,000
2010	Romantic Style Parte 3: Desde La Esencia: Released: March 30, 2010; Formats: CD, digital download	—	20	—	—		
"—" denotes the album failed to chart or not released

=== EPs ===
- 2009: AOL Dejando Huellas

== Singles ==
The following singles have been released commercially with their respective music videos; this section does not include promotional singles.

Title	Year	Peak chart positions							Certifications	Album
Title	Year	US	US Latin	US Latin Rhythm	US Trop	US Latin Pop	US Reg Mex	SPA	Certifications	Album
"Te Quiero"	2007	86	1	1	1	3	7	1	MEX: Diamond	Te Quiero: Romantic Style In Da World
"Escápate"	2007	—	—	15	—	—	—	—		Te Quiero: Romantic Style In Da World
"Sin Tu Amor" (featuring Alex Pro)	2008	—	—	—	—	—	—	—		Te Quiero: Romantic Style In Da World
"Te Quiero (Remix)" (featuring Belinda)	2008	—	—	—	—	—	—	—		Te Quiero: Romantic Style In Da World
"Te Dejaré"	2009	—	—	—	—	—	—	—		La Evolución Romantic Style
"Dime Si Te Vas Con Él" (featuring Mr. Saik)	2009	120	1	7	2	23	22	—		La Evolución Romantic Style
"Te Amo Tanto"	2009	—	29	6	10	37	—	—		La Evolución Romantic Style
"Besos de Amor" (featuring Ricky Rick)	2010	—	36	7	26	40	—	—		Romantic Style Parte 3: Desde La Esencia
"Entre Mis Brazos"	2010	—	—	—	—	—	—	—		Romantic Style Parte 3: Desde La Esencia
"Si Tú Te Vas"	2010	—	—	—	—	—	—	—		Romantic Style Parte 3: Desde La Esencia
As featured artist
"Por Ti Baby" (Kumbia All Starz featuring Flex)	2008	—	23	6	—	—	—	—		Planeta Kumbia
"—" denotes the single failed to chart or not released

=== Collaborations ===
- 2007 Vete (with Eddie Lover)
- 2008 Luna (Remix) (with El Artista)
- 2008 Bésame Otra Vez (with Filthy Rich)
- 2008 Escúcheme Señora (with Alex Pro)
- 2008 Amor Letra Por Letra (with Eiza González)
- 2008 Por Ti Baby (with Kumbia All Starz)
- 2008 Me Acuerdo (with Vico C) (El show de los sueños)
- 2008 Sigue Bailando Mi Amor (Remix) (with El Roockie)
- 2009 La Múcura (with Yuri)
- 2009 Carita Bonita (Remix) (with Erre XI and Pee Wee)
- 2011 Contestame El Telefono (with Alexis & Fido)
- 2011 Si Decides Regresar (with Mach, Daddy & El Roockie)
- 2011 En Silencio (Remix) (with Eddy Lover, Joey Montana, El Rockie, Mr Phillips, Mach And Daddy)

== Music videos ==
Year	Song	Director(s)
2007	"Escápate"	Lucho Espada
2007	"Te Quiero"	Conrado Martínez
2007	"Sin Tu Amor" (with Alex Pro)	Conrado Martínez
2008	"Te Quiero" (Spanglish Version) (with Belinda)	Billy Mann
2008	"Por Ti Baby" (with Kumbia All Starz)	Lucuma
2008	"Te Dejaré"	Gabo Ximenez
2009	"Dime Si Te Vas Con Él" (with Mr. Saik)	La Cuadra
2009	"Te Amo Tanto"	Conrado Martínez
2010	"Besos de Amor" (with Ricky Rick)	Eduardo Duque & Andre Barren
