= 2009 Latin Billboard Music Awards =

Annual American music awards ceremony

2009 Billboard Latin Music Awards
- Date: April 23, 2009
- Venue: BankUnited Center, University of Miami, Coral Gables, Florida

The 2009 Billboard Latin Music Awards was held on Thursday, April 23, 2009, at the BankUnited Center at the University of Miami in Coral Gables, Florida, United States. It is produced and broadcast lived on Telemundo network. The nominees were announced on Tuesday, February 17, 2009, during a live televised morning show Levantate on Telemundo network.

== Host ==
- Aylín Mújica
- Alan Tacher

== Performers ==
- Aventura, Wisin & Yandel & Akon - "All Up 2 You"
- Cristian Castro - "El Culpable Soy Yo" (with special guest, Arthur Hanlon)
- Enrique Iglesias - "Lloro Por Ti"
- Paulina Rubio - "Causa y Efecto"
- Patrulla 81
- Daddy Yankee & JabbawockeeZ
- La Quinta Estación
- Flex - "Te Quiero" and "Dime Si Te Vas Con Él"
- Gloria Trevi
- Banda el Recodo
- Carlos Santana & Maná
- Don Omar - "Virtual Diva"
- Reik - "Fui"
- Rubén Blades & Los Seis Del Solar

== Presenters ==
- Gilberto Santa Rosa
- Diana Reyes
- Jerry Rivera
- María Celeste Arrarás
- R.K.M & Ken-Y
- Kany García
- Jencarlos Canela
- Gaby Espino
- Don Omar
- Marcy Place
- Melina León
- Germán Montero
- Rashel Diaz
- K-Paz de la Sierra
- Chico Castillo
- Chenoa
- Maná
- Eddy Lover
- Demphra
- Fanny Lú
- Penélope Menchacaa
- NG2
- Maritza Rodríguez
- Catherine Siachoque
- Miguel Varoni
- Lorenzo Negrete
- Maria Fernanda Yepes
- Vin Diesel
- Yarel
- Xtreme
- Carmen Villalobos
- Aleks Syntek
- Dayana Mendoza
- Los Horóscopos de Durango
- Jorge Bernal

== Special awards ==
=== Lifetime achievement award ===
- Carlos Santana

=== Spirit of Hope Award ===
- Daddy Yankee

=== Hall of Fame ===
- Pablo Raúl Alarcón Sr.

=== Your World Award (Premio Tu Mundo) ===
- Luis Fonsi

== Note ==
Winners are listed in bold.

== Hot Latin Songs ==
=== Hot Latin Song of the Year ===
- **Te Quiero - Flex**
- No me doy por vencido - Luis Fonsi
- ¿Dónde Están Corazón? - Enrique Iglesias
- Si No Te Hubieras Ido - Maná

=== Hot Latin Song of the Year Vocal Duet or Collaboration ===
- **No Hay Nadie Como Tú - Calle 13 featuring Café Tacuba**
- Un Buen Perdedor - K-Paz de la Sierra featuring Franco De Vita
- Aire - Luz Rios featuring Joan Sebastian
- No Me Digas Que No - Xtreme featuring Adrienne Bailon

=== Hot Latin Songs Artist of the Year ===
- Vicente Fernández
- Flex
- **Enrique Iglesias**
- Juanes

=== Hot Latin Song of the Year Male ===
(New Category)

- Para Siempre - Vicente Fernández
- **Te Quiero - Flex**
- No me doy por vencido - Luis Fonsi
- ¿Dónde Están Corazón? - Enrique Iglesias

=== Hot Latin Song of the Year Female ===
(New Category)

- **Dime - Ivy Queen**
- Culpable O Inocente - Jenni Rivera
- Inolvidable - Jenni Rivera
- El Presente - Julieta Venegas

=== Hot Latin Song of the Year Duo or Group ===
(New Category)

- Dame Tu Amor - Alacranes Musical
- Hasta el Día de Hoy - Los Dareyes de la Sierra
- La Cumbia Del Río - Los Pikadientes de Caborca
- **Si No Te Hubieras Ido - Maná**

=== Hot Latin Song of the Year New ===
(New Category)

- **Te Quiero - Flex**
- Hasta el Día de Hoy - Los Dareyes de la Sierra
- La Cumbia Del Río - Los Pikadientes de Caborca
- Amantes Escondidos - German Montero

=== Hot Latin Songs Label of the Year ===
- Fonovisa
- Machete
- **Sony Music Latin**
- Universal Music Latino

== Top Latin Albums ==
=== Latin Album of the Year ===
- Kings of Bachata: Sold Out at Madison Square Garden - Aventura
- Te Quiero - Flex
- **95/08 - Enrique Iglesias**
- Arde El Cielo - Maná

=== Top Latin Albums Artist of the Year ===
- **Vicente Fernández**
- Flex
- Enrique Iglesias
- Marco Antonio Solís

=== Top Latin Album of the Year Male ===
(New Category)

- Te Quiero - Flex
- **95/08 - Enrique Iglesias**
- Una Noche en Madrid - Marco Antonio Solís
- Talento de Barrio (soundtrack) - Daddy Yankee

=== Top Latin Album of the Year Female ===
(New Category)

- Real... En Vivo - Ednita Nazario
- Insatisfecha - Diana Reyes
- **Jenni** - Jenni Rivera
- Julieta Venegas: MTV Unplugged - Julieta Venegas

=== Top Latin Album of the Year Duo or Group ===
(New Category)

- **Kings of Bachata: Sold Out at Madison Square Garden - Aventura**
- Arde El Cielo - Maná
- Si Tú Te Vas - Los Temerarios
- Tu Inspiracion - Alacranes Musical

=== Top Latin Album of the Year New ===
(New Category)

- Wisin & Yandel Presentan: La Mente Maestra - DJ Nesty
- **Te Quiero - Flex**
- Vámonos Pa'l Río - Los Pikadientes de Caborca
- Con Banda - Los Dareyes de la Sierra

=== Top Latin Albums Label of the Year ===
- EMI Televisa
- Sony Music Latin
- **Universal Music Latin Entertainment**
- Warner Latina

== Latin Pop ==
=== Latin Pop Airplay Song of the Year, Male ===
- Te Quiero - Flex
- No me doy por vencido - Luis Fonsi
- **¿Dónde Están Corazón? - Enrique Iglesias**
- Gotas de Agua Dulce - Juanes

=== Latin Pop Airplay Song of the Year, Female ===
- Donde Estara Mi Primavera - Myriam Hernández
- **Cinco Minutos - Gloria Trevi**
- El Presente - Julieta Venegas
- Ahora Entendi - Yuridia

=== Latin Pop Airplay Song of the Year, Duo or Group ===
- Cada Que... - Belanova
- No Te Quiero Nada - Ha*Ash
- **Si No Te Hubieras Ido - Maná**
- Inolvidable - Reik

=== Latin Pop Airplay Label of the Year ===
- EMI Televisa
- Sony Music Latin
- **Universal Music Latino**
- Warner Latina

=== Latin Pop Album of the Year, Solo ===
- 5to Piso - Ricardo Arjona
- Palabras del Silencio - Luis Fonsi
- **95/08 - Enrique Iglesias**
- Cómplices - Luis Miguel

=== Latin Pop Album of the Year, Duo or Group ===
- Mejores Cantos Religiosos - Grupo Nueva Vida
- **Arde El Cielo - Maná**
- Planeta Kumbia - A.B. Quintanilla Presenta Kumbia All Starz
- Hasta Ahora - Sin Bandera

=== Latin Pop Albums Label of the Year ===
- EMI Televisa
- Sony Music Latin
- **Universal Music Latin Entertainment**
- Warner Latina

== Tropical ==
=== Tropical Airplay Song of the Year, Male ===
- Sin Perdon - Hector Acosta
- Donde Estan Esos Amigos - El Chaval De La Bachata
- **Te Quiero - Flex**
- Amor Desperdiciado - Frank Reyes

=== Tropical Airplay Song of the Year, Female ===
- Píntame De Colores - Gloria Estefan
- Quiero Tenerte - Marala
- **Dime - Ivy Queen**
- Cosas del Amor - Olga Tañón featuring Milly Quezada

=== Tropical Airplay Song of the Year, Duo or Group ===
- En Aquel Lugar - Adolescent's Orquesta
- **El Perdedor - Aventura**
- Todo Lo Que Soy - Marcy Place Featuring Don Omar
- Ahora Es - Wisin & Yandel

=== Tropical Airplay Label of the Year ===
- EMI Televisa
- J & N
- Machete
- **Sony Music Latin**

=== Tropical Album of the Year, Solo ===
- Mitad/Mitad - Hector Acosta
- Historia De Un Sonero - Víctor Manuelle
- Soy - Víctor Manuelle
- **Una Navidad Con Gilberto - Gilberto Santa Rosa**

=== Tropical Album of the Year, Duo or Group ===
- **K.O.B. Live - Aventura**
- Buena Vista Social Club At Carnegie Hall - Buena Vista Social Club
- En Vivo Desde Bellas Artes - Monchy y Alexandra
- Chapter Dos - Xtreme

=== Tropical Albums Label of the Year ===
- EMI Televisa
- Emusica
- **Sony Music Latin**
- Universal Music Latin Entertainment

== Regional Mexican ==
=== Regional Mexican Airplay Song of the Year, Male ===
- **Para Siempre - Vicente Fernández**
- La Derrota - Vicente Fernández
- Amantes Escondidos - German Montero
- El Proximo Viernes - **Isidro Chavez "Espinoza Paz" Espinoza**

=== Regional Mexican Airplay Song of the Year, Female ===
- **Culpable O Inocente Jenni Rivera**
- Inolvidable - Jenni Rivera
- Me Muero - Diana Reyes
- Aire - Luz Rios Featuring Joan Sebastian

=== Regional Mexican Airplay Song of the Year, Duo Or Group ===
- Dame Tu Amor - Alacranes Musical
- Y Que Quede Claro - La Arrolladora Banda El Limón
- **Hasta el Día de Hoy - Los Dareyes de la Sierra**
- La Cumbia del Río - Los Pikadientes de Caborca

=== Regional Mexican Airplay Label of the Year ===
- ASL
- Disa
- **Fonovisa**
- Sony Music Latin

=== Regional Mexican Album of the Year, Solo Artist ===
- Primera Fila - Vicente Fernández
- Jenni - Jenni Rivera
- **Una Noche en Madrid - Marco Antonio Solís**
- No Molestar - Marco Antonio Solís

=== Regional Mexican Album of the Year, Duo Or Group ===
- Tu Inspiración - Alacranes Musical
- Con Banda - Los Dareyes de la Sierra
- **Si Tú Te Vas - Los Temerarios**
- Vámonos Pa'l Río - Los Pikadientes de Caborca

=== Regional Mexican Albums Label of the Year ===
- EMI Televisa
- Sony Music Latin
- Three Sound
- **Universal Music Latin Entertainment**

== Latin Rhythm ==
=== Latin Rhythm Airplay Song of the Year, Solo ===
(New Category)

- Permitame - Tony Dize
- **Te Quiero - Flex**
- Dime - Ivy Queen
- Pose - Daddy Yankee

=== Latin Rhythm Airplay Song of the Year, Duo or Group ===
(New Category)

- Na De Na - Angel & Khriz
- **El Perdedor - Aventura**
- Ahora Es - Wisin & Yandel
- Síguelo - Wisin & Yandel

=== Latin Rhythm Airplay Label of the Year ===
- EMI Televisa
- **Machete**
- Sony Music Latin
- Universal Music Latino

=== Latin Rhythm Album of the Year, Solo ===
(New Category)

- Wisin & Yandel Presentan: La Mente Maestra - DJ Nesty
- La Melodía de la Calle - Tony Dize
- **Te Quiero - Flex**
- Talento de Barrio (soundtrack) - Daddy Yankee

=== Latin Rhythm Album of the Year, Duo Or Group ===
(New Category)

- La Novela - Akwid
- Nuevas Metas - La Factoría
- The Royalty: La Realeza - RKM & Ken-Y
- **Wisin vs. Yandel: Los Extraterrestres - Wisin & Yandel**

=== Latin Rhythm Albums Label of the Year ===
- EMI Televisa
- Interscope Geffen A&M
- Sony Music Latin
- **Universal Music Latin Entertainment**

== Touring ==
=== Latin Tour of the Year ===
- Alejandro Fernández
- Vicente Fernández
- Luis Miguel
- **RBD - Gira del Adiós World Tour**

== Digital ==
=== Latin RingMasters of the Year ===
- Cyclone - Baby Bash Featuring T-Pain
- **"Te Quiero - Flex**
- Perdoname - La Factoría
- La Cumbia Del Río - Los Pikadientes de Caborca

=== Latin Digital Download Artist of the Year ===
(New Category)

- Aventura
- Enrique Iglesias
- **Pitbull**
- Shakira

== Greatest Hits/Compilations ==
=== Latin Greatest Hits Album of the Year ===
- **95/08 - Enrique Iglesias**
- 20 Aniversario - Los Tucanes de Tijuana
- La Historia - El Chapo de Sinaloa
- Puro Exitos Chacas - Los Cuates de Sinaloa

=== Latin Compilation Album of the Year ===
- 18 Exitos: Sonidero Hits Vol. 3 - Various Artists
- Banda # 1's - Various Artists
- Duranguense # 1's - Various Artists
- **Idolos De Mexico Para El Mundo - Various Artists**

== Latin Rock/Alternative ==
=== Latin Rock/Alternative Album of the Year ===
- **Arde El Cielo - Maná**
- Mediocre - Ximena Sariñana
- Julieta Venegas:MTV Unplugged - Julieta Venegas
- Realmente lo Mejor - Julieta Venegas

== Songwriter/Publishers/Producers ==
=== Songwriter of the Year ===
- Juan Esteban Aristizabal
- **Isidro Chavez "Espinoza Paz" Espinoza**
- Joan Sebastian
- Marco Antonio Solís

=== Publisher of the Year ===
- **Arpa, BMI**
- EMI Blackwood, BMI
- Sony/ATV Discos, ASCAP
- WB Music, ASCAP

=== Publishing Corporation of the Year ===
- Arpa Music
- EMI Music
- Universal Music
- **Warner/Chappell Music**

=== Producer of the Year ===
- **Armando Avila**
- Irving Dominguez
- Fher Olvera & Alex González
- Joan Sebastian
