= Billboard Latin Music Award for Latin Rhythm Album of the Year =

American music award

- Current: 2024 Billboard Latin Music Awards
- Country: United States
- Presented by: Billboard
- First award: 2009

Highlights
- Most awards: Bad Bunny (4)
- Most nominations: Bad Bunny (7)
- Website: billboardevents.com

The Billboard Latin Music Award for Latin Rhythm Album of the Year is an honor that is presented annually at the Billboard Latin Music Awards, a ceremony which honors "the most popular albums, songs, and performers in Latin music, as determined by the actual sales, radio airplay, streaming and social data that shapes Billboard's weekly charts."

The accolade for Latin Rhythm Album of the Year was first presented at the fifteenth Billboard Latin Music Awards in 2009 to Panamanian singer Flex's Te Quiero (2008). The album, along with the title track gained Flex thirteen nominations at the ceremony, where the album also received a nomination for Latin Album of the Year, Latin Album of the Year in the male category and Latin Album of the Year in the new artist category. It led the Billboard Latin Rhythm Albums chart for sixteen weeks in 2008. Puerto Rican act Bad Bunny is the most awarded act with four wins, and is also the most nominated act with seven nominations. Puerto Rico is the most awarded nationality, receiving eleven wins. Panama, Colombia and the United States are the only other awarded nationalities.

== Recipients ==
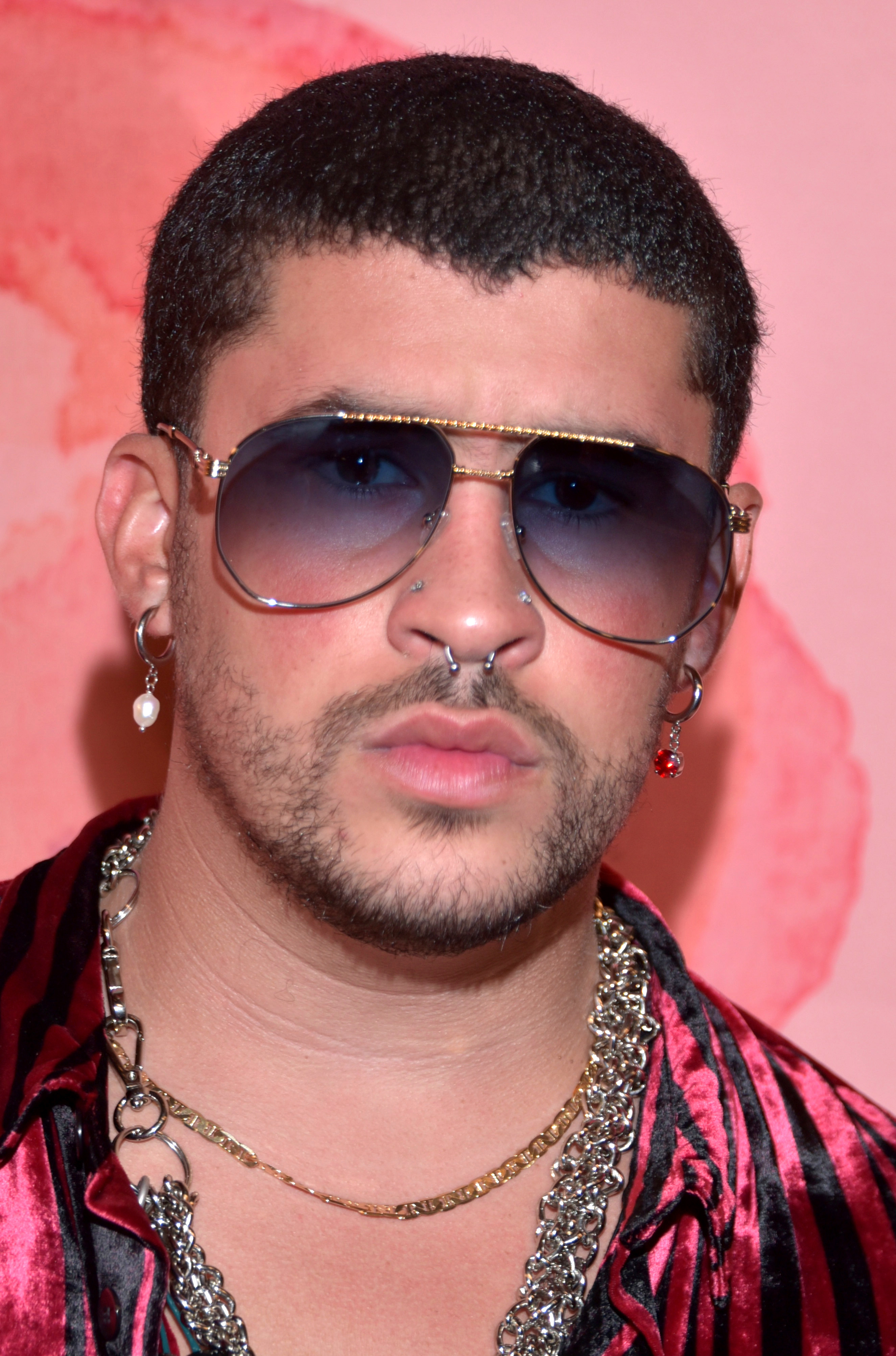
Three-time winners Wisin & Yandel (above) and Bad Bunny (below)

Year^{[I]}	Performing artist(s)	Nationality^{[II]}	Work	Nominees^{[III]}	Ref.
2009	Flex	Panama	Te Quiero	DJ Nesty — Wisin & Yandel Presentan: La Mente Maestra; Tony Dize — La Melodía De La Calle; Daddy Yankee — Talento De Barrio	
2010	Wisin & Yandel	Puerto Rico	La Revolución	Tito "El Bambino" — El Patrón; Don Omar — iDon; Flex — La Evolución Romantic Style	
2011	Daddy Yankee	Puerto Rico	Mundial	Pitbull — Armando; Don Omar — Don Omar Presents: Meet the Orphans; Chino & Nacho — Niña Bonita	
2012	Wisin & Yandel	Puerto Rico	Los Vaqueros: El Regreso	Pitbull — Armando; Don Omar — Don Omar Presents: Meet the Orphans; Tito "El Bambino" — Invencible	
2013	Don Omar	Puerto Rico	Don Omar Presents MTO²: New Generation	Various artists — Pina Records Presenta: La Fórmula: The Company; Wisin & Yandel — Líderes; Daddy Yankee — Prestige	
2014	Wisin & Yandel	Puerto Rico	Líderes	Yandel — De Líder a Leyenda; Various artists — Pina Records Presenta: La Fórmula: The Company; Don Omar — Don Omar Presents MTO²: New Generation	
2015	Wisin	Puerto Rico	El Regreso del Sobreviviente	J Balvin — La Familia; Plan B — Love and Sex; Calle 13 — Multiviral	
2016	Pitbull	United States	Dale	Don Omar — The Last Don II; Tony Dize — La Melodía de la Calle, 3rd Season; Yandel — Legacy: De Líder a Leyenda Tour	
2017	J Balvin	Colombia	Energia	Farruko — Visionary; Maluma — Pretty Boy, Dirty Boy; Yandel — Dangerous	
2018	Nicky Jam	United States	Fénix	Ozuna — Odisea; Yandel — Update; Zion & Lennox — Motivan2	
2019	Ozuna	Puerto Rico	Odisea	Anuel AA — Real Hasta la Muerte; J Balvin — Vibras; Ozuna — Aura	
2020	Bad Bunny	Puerto Rico	X 100pre	Farruko — Gangalee; J Balvin and Bad Bunny — Oasis; Sech — Sueños	
2021	Bad Bunny	Puerto Rico	YHLQMDLG	Anuel AA — Emmanuel; Bad Bunny — El Último Tour del Mundo; Bad Bunny — Las que no iban a salir; Maluma — Papi Juancho	
2022	Bad Bunny	Puerto Rico	Un Verano Sin Ti	Farruko — La 167; J Balvin — Jose; Karol G — KG0516; Rauw Alejandro — Vice Versa	
2023	Karol G	Colombia	Mañana Será Bonito	Anuel AA — LLNM2; Eladio Carrión — 3men2 Kbrn; Feid — Feliz Cumpleaños Ferxxo Te Pirateamos el Álbum; Rauw Alejandro — Saturno	
2024	Bad Bunny	Puerto Rico	Nadie Sabe Lo Que Va a Pasar Mañana	Feid — Ferxxocalipsis; Karol G — Mañana Será Bonito (Bichota Season); Rauw Alejandro — Playa Saturno; Tainy — Data	

== Records ==
=== Most nominations ===
Nominations	Recipient	Nationality
7	Bad Bunny	Puerto Rico
6	Don Omar	Puerto Rico
5	J Balvin	Colombia
4	Wisin & Yandel	Puerto Rico
4	Yandel (solo)	Puerto Rico
3	Daddy Yankee	Puerto Rico
3	Farruko	Puerto Rico
3	Ozuna	Puerto Rico
3	Anuel AA	Puerto Rico
3	Rauw Alejandro	Puerto Rico
3	Pitbull	United States
3	Karol G	Colombia
2	Maluma	Colombia
2	Feid	Colombia
2	Flex	Panama
2	Tony Dize	United States
2	Tito "El Bambino"	Puerto Rico

=== Most awards ===
Awards	Producer
4	Bad Bunny
3	Wisin & Yandel

== See also ==
- Latin Grammy Award for Best Urban Music Album
- Lo Nuestro Award for Urban Album of the Year

== Notes ==
^{^[I]} Each year is linked to the article about the Billboard Latin Music Awards held that year.
^{^[II]} The nationality of the performing artist(s).
^{^[III]} The name of the performer(s) and the nominated song
