= List of Billboard Latin Rhythm Albums number ones of 2009 =

The Latin Rhythm Albums chart is a music chart published in Billboard magazine. This data is compiled by Nielsen SoundScan from a sample that includes music stores, music departments at electronics and department stores, internet sales (both physical and digital) and verifiable sales from concert venues in the United States to determine the top-selling Latin rhythm albums in the United States each week. The chart is composed of studio, live, and compilation releases by Latin artists performing in the Latin hip hop, urban, dance and reggaeton, the most popular Latin rhythm music genres.

== Albums ==
Chart date	Album	Artist(s)	Reference
January 3	Wisin Y Yandel Presentan La Mente Maestra	Wisin & Yandel	
January 10	Wisin Y Yandel Presentan La Mente Maestra	Wisin & Yandel	
January 17	Wisin Y Yandel Presentan La Mente Maestra	Wisin & Yandel	
January 24	Wisin Y Yandel Presentan La Mente Maestra	Wisin & Yandel	
January 31	Wisin Y Yandel Presentan La Mente Maestra	Wisin & Yandel	
February 7	Wisin Y Yandel Presentan La Mente Maestra	Wisin & Yandel	
February 14	La Evolución Romantic Style	Flex	
February 21	La Evolución Romantic Style	Flex	
February 28	La Evolución Romantic Style	Flex	
March 7	La Evolución Romantic Style	Flex	
March 14	La Evolución Romantic Style	Flex	
March 21	Wisin & Yandel Presentan: La Mente Maestra	Wisin & Yandel	
March 28	Wisin & Yandel Presentan: La Mente Maestra	Wisin & Yandel	
April 4	Talento de Barrio (soundtrack)	Daddy Yankee	
April 11	El Patrón	Tito "El Bambino" El Patron	
April 18	El Patrón	Tito "El Bambino" El Patron	
April 25	El Patrón	Tito "El Bambino" El Patron	
May 2	El Patrón	Tito "El Bambino" El Patron	
May 9	El Patrón	Tito "El Bambino" El Patron	
May 16	iDon	Don Omar	
May 23	iDon	Don Omar	
May 30	iDon	Don Omar	
June 6	iDon	Don Omar	
June 13	La Revolución	Wisin & Yandel	
June 20	La Revolución	Wisin & Yandel	
June 27	La Revolución	Wisin & Yandel	
July 4	La Revolución	Wisin & Yandel	
July 11	La Revolución	Wisin & Yandel	
July 18	La Revolución	Wisin & Yandel	
July 25	La Revolución	Wisin & Yandel	
August 1	La Revolución	Wisin & Yandel	
August 8	La Revolución	Wisin & Yandel	
August 15	La Revolución	Wisin & Yandel	
August 22	La Revolución	Wisin & Yandel	
August 29	La Revolución	Wisin & Yandel	
September 5	La Revolución	Wisin & Yandel	
September 12	La Revolución	Wisin & Yandel	
September 19	La Revolución	Wisin & Yandel	
September 26	La Revolución	Wisin & Yandel	
October 3	La Revolución	Wisin & Yandel	
October 10	La Revolución	Wisin & Yandel	
October 17	La Revolución	Wisin & Yandel	
October 24	La Revolución	Wisin & Yandel	
October 31	La Revolución	Wisin & Yandel	
November 7	La Revolución	Wisin & Yandel	
November 14	La Revolución	Wisin & Yandel	
November 21	La Revolución	Wisin & Yandel	
November 28	La Revolución	Wisin & Yandel	
December 5	La Melodia De La Calle [Updated]	Tony Dize	
December 12	La Revolución	Wisin & Yandel	
December 19	El Principe	Cosculluela	
December 26	La Revolución	Wisin & Yandel	
