= A Todo Romantic Style =

Compilation album by Flex
- Released: March 29, 2011
- Genres: Reggae, reggaeton
- Length: 54:53
- Labels: EMI Latin; Big Moon Records

Flex chronology
Romantic Style Parte 3: Desde La Esencia (2010)	A Todo Romantic Style (2011)	Vives En Mí (2012)

A Todo Romantic Style es un album recopilatorio by Panamian singer-songwriter Flex. It was released on March 29, 2011 through EMI Latin and Big Moon Records. This album contains 10 songs which were released on the album Romantic Style Parte 3: Desde La Esencia and five international hits previously released their first two albums.

== Track list ==
No.	Title	Writer(s)	Length
1.	"Quiero Besarte"	Félix Danilo Gómez	4:00
2.	"Se Acabó Mi Vida"	Félix Danilo Gómez	4:23
3.	"No Siento Tu Amor"	Félix Danilo Gómez	3:27
4.	"Si Tu Te Vas"	Félix Danilo Gómez	3:35
5.	"Besos de Amor" (featuring Ricky Rick)	Félix Danilo Gómez, Reynold Martínez Esparza, Ricardo Ruiz Pérez	3:38
6.	"Caliente"	Félix Danilo Gómez	3:27
7.	"Nena"	Félix Danilo Gómez	3:45
8.	"Un Segundo Verla" (featuring Lil Phas)	Félix Danilo Gómez	4:03
9.	"Esperándote"	Félix Danilo Gómez, Víctor Delgado	3:20
10.	"Entre Mis Brazos"	Félix Danilo Gómez	3:11
11.	"Te Amo Tanto"	Félix Danilo Gómez	3:28
12.	"Te Quiero"	Félix Danilo Gómez	3:20
13.	"Dime Si Te Vas Con Él" (featuring Mr. Saik)	Félix Danilo Gómez, Fernando Cabrera	3:55
14.	"Sin Tu Amor" (featuring Alex Pro)	Félix Danilo Gómez, Félix Alexander Gómez	3:31
15.	"Luna"	Félix Danilo Gómez	3:16
