= Latin Airplay =

Record chart in the United States

Latin Airplay is a chart published weekly by Billboard magazine in the United States. It was established on October 20, 2012.

This chart lists the 50 most-played songs on Spanish-language radio stations across the country as monitored by Nielsen Broadcast Data Systems (BDS) weighted to each station's Nielsen ratings. It is based on the Hot Latin Songs chart's former methodology prior to October 20, 2012 which was revamped afterwards to rank the best-performing Spanish-language songs based on streaming, digital downloads, and airplay from all radio stations in the US. Although the Latin Airplay was launched on October 20, 2012, it retroactively includes songs that ranked on the Hot Latin Songs since the issue dated November 12, 1994, which was when the Billboard began incorporating Nielsen BDS to the Hot Latin Songs chart methodology. Unlike the Hot Latin Songs chart, the Latin Airplay does not require a song to be predominantly sung in Spanish, thus any song is eligible to rank on it.

The first number one song at the chart's launch was "Algo Me Gusta de Ti" by Wisin & Yandel featuring Chris Brown and T-Pain, while the online database lists "No Me Queda Más" by Selena as its first number one.

== Component charts ==
The Latin Airplay has four subcharts that not only contributes to the overall calculation of the chart, but reflects on the diverse Spanish-language music genres that are listened to by the Hispanic audience. They were previously subcharts of the Hot Latin Songs chart prior to Billboard changing its methodology in 2012. These are:

- Latin Pop Airplay: Ranks the best-performing Spanish-language Latin pop songs, namely pop ballads and mid/up-tempo tracks, on Spanish-language radio stations. Prior to August 15, 2020, the chart listed the most-played songs on Latin pop radio stations.
- Tropical Airplay: Ranks the best-performing Spanish-language tropical songs, specifically, musical styles originating from the Hispanophone Caribbean, on Spanish-language radio stations. Prior to January 21, 2017, the chart listed the most-played songs on tropical radio stations.
- Regional Mexican Airplay: Ranks the most-played songs on Regional Mexican radio stations in the US. It is the only subchart of the Latin Airplay chart that continues to be spin-based, rather than audience impression from all Spanish-language radio stations like the other charts listed.
- Latin Rhythm Airplay: Ranks the best-performing Spanish-language Latin rhythm songs such as reggaeton and Latin hip hop/Latin trap on Spanish-language radio stations. Prior to January 8, 2011, the chart listed the most-played songs on Latin rhythm radio stations.

== Chart achievements ==
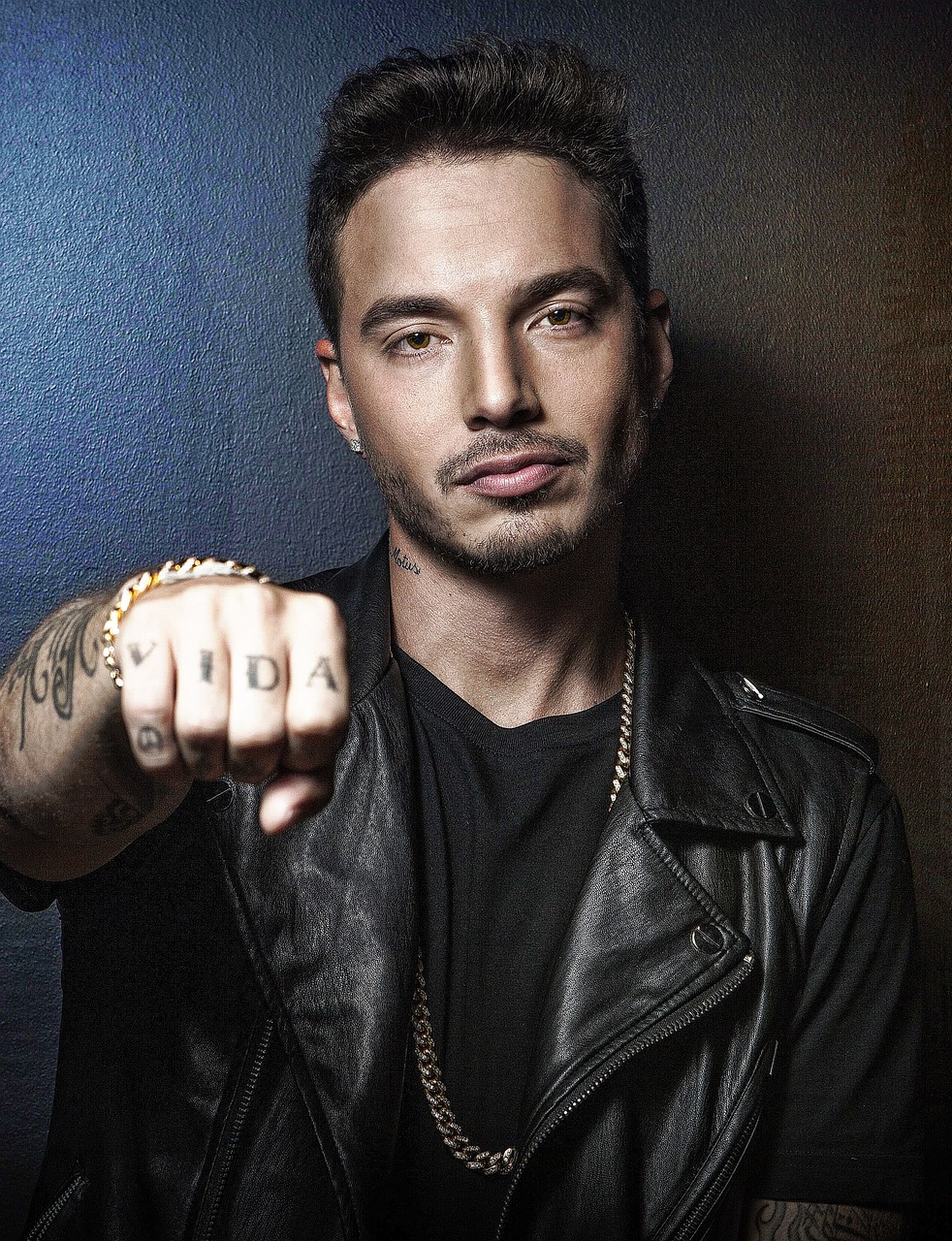
J Balvin holds the record for the most number one songs since 2021 with 40.

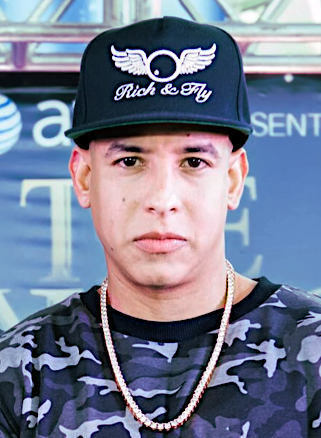
Daddy Yankee holds the record for the most top 10 songs and most entries since 2021.

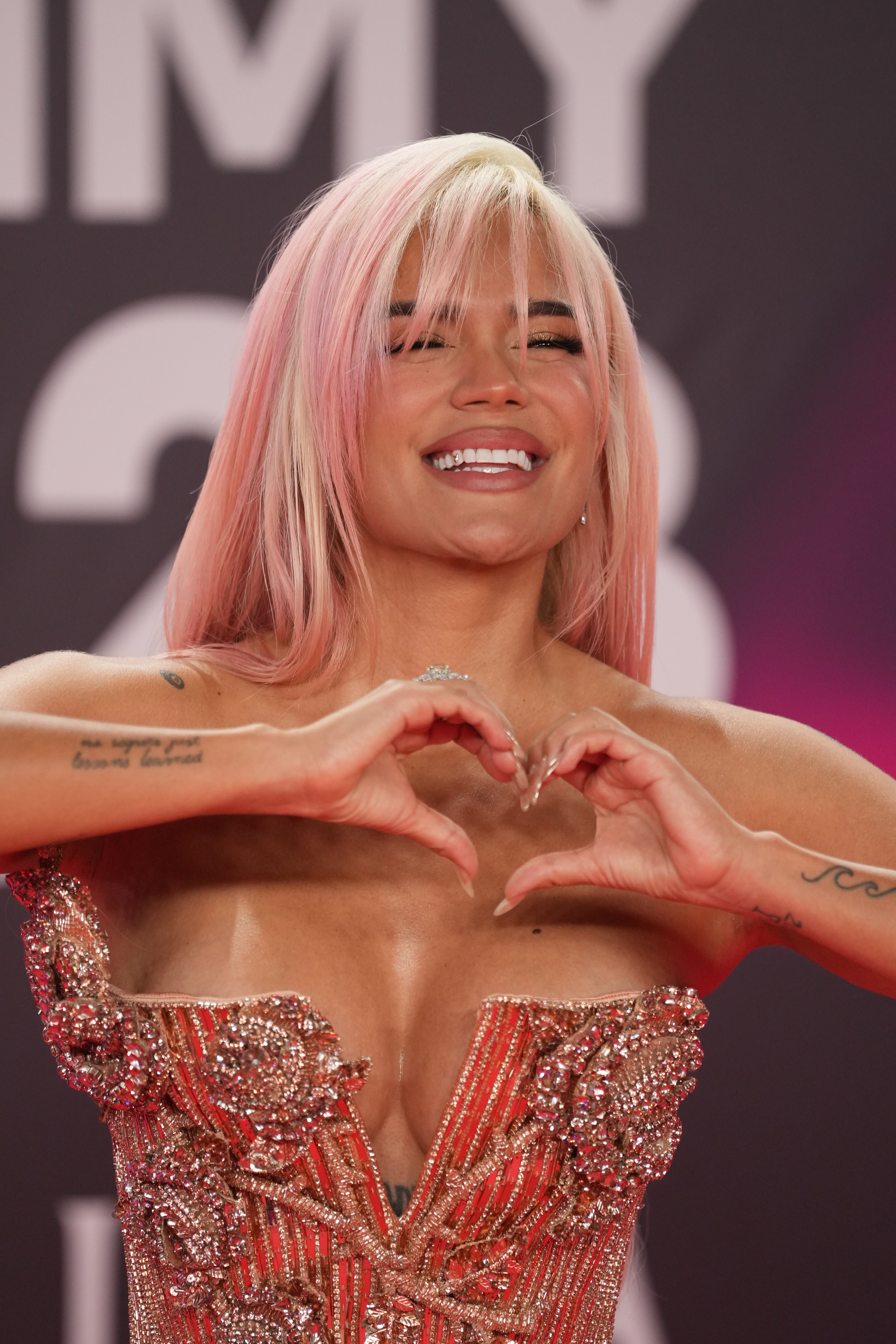
"Si Antes Te Hubiera Conocido" by Karol G is the longest-running number one song with 27 weeks.

=== Artists with the most number-one hits ===
Total	Artist	Source
40	J Balvin	
38	Ozuna	
32	Enrique Iglesias	
31	Bad Bunny	
31	Daddy Yankee	
26	Maluma	
26	Romeo Santos	
25	Shakira	
24	Wisin	
23	Karol G	

=== Artists with the most top-ten hits ===
Total	Artist	Source
52	Daddy Yankee	
46	J Balvin	
45	Shakira	
43	Ozuna	
41	Enrique Iglesias	
37	Bad Bunny	
35	Marc Anthony	
35	Maluma	
31	Alejandro Fernández	
31	Calibre 50	

=== Artists with the most entries ===
Total	Artist	Source
92	Daddy Yankee	
75	Ozuna	
67	Intocable	
66	Los Tigres del Norte	
65	J Balvin	
65	Maluma	
62	Marc Anthony	
59	Shakira	
56	Alejandro Fernández	
56	Bad Bunny	

=== Songs with the most weeks at number one ===
Year	Single	Performer(s)	Weeks at #1	Ref
2024	"Si Antes Te Hubiera Conocido"	Karol G	27	
2005	"La Tortura"	Shakira featuring Alejandro Sanz	25	
2000	"A Puro Dolor"	Son by Four	20	
2007	"Me Enamora"	Juanes	20	
2008	"Te Quiero"	Flex	20	
2014	"Bailando"	Enrique Iglesias featuring Gente de Zona and Descemer Bueno	20	
