= List of number-one Billboard Regional Mexican Songs of 2008 =

The Billboard Regional Mexican Songs chart ranks the best-performing Regional Mexican singles in the United States. Published weekly by Billboard magazine, it ranks the "most popular regional Mexican songs, ranked by radio airplay audience impressions as measured by Nielsen Music."

== Chart history ==
The yellow background indicates the best-performing song of 2008.

Issue date	Song	Artist(s)	Ref.
January 5	"Sobre mis pies"	La Arrolladora Banda el Limón de René Camacho	
January 12	"Un buen perdedor"	K-Paz with Franco De Vita	
January 19	"Estos Celos"	Vicente Fernández	
January 26	"Sobre mis pies"	La Arrolladora Banda el Limón de René Camacho	
February 2	"Un buen perdedor"	K-Paz With Franco De Vita	
February 9	"Sobre mis pies"	La Arrolladora Banda el Limón de René Camacho	
February 16	"Te lloré"	Conjunto Primavera	
February 23	"Sobre mis pies"	La Arrolladora Banda el Limón de René Camacho	
March 1	"Sobre mis pies"	La Arrolladora Banda el Limón de René Camacho	
March 8	"Te lloré"	Conjunto Primavera	
March 15	"Te lloré"	Conjunto Primavera	
March 22	"Sobre mis pies"	La Arrolladora Banda el Limón de René Camacho	
March 29	"Sobre mis pies"	La Arrolladora Banda el Limón de René Camacho	
April 5	"Sobre mis pies"	La Arrolladora Banda el Limón de René Camacho	
April 12	"Sobre mis pies"	La Arrolladora Banda el Limón de René Camacho	
April 19	"Tómame o déjame"	Banda El Recodo de Cruz Lizárraga	
April 26	"Te lloré"	Conjunto Primavera	
May 3	"Sobre mis pies"	La Arrolladora Banda el Limón de René Camacho	
May 10	"Tu adiós no mata"	Intocable	
May 17	"Hasta el día de hoy"	Dareyes de La Sierra	
May 24	"La derrota"	Vicente Fernández	
May 31	"Hasta el día de hoy"	Dareyes de La Sierra	
June 7	"Hasta el día de hoy"	Dareyes de La Sierra	
June 14	"A punto de llorar"	Los Rieleros del Norte	
June 21	"Amantes escondidos"	German Montero	
June 28	"Hasta el día de hoy"	Dareyes de La Sierra	
July 5	"Hasta el día de hoy"	Dareyes de La Sierra	
July 12	"Hasta el día de hoy"	Dareyes de La Sierra	
July 19	"Hasta el día de hoy"	Dareyes de La Sierra	
July 26	"Hasta el día de hoy"	Dareyes de La Sierra	
August 2	"Tu adiós no mata"	Intocable	
August 9	"Para siempre"	Vicente fernández	
August 16	"Para siempre"	Vicente fernández	
August 23	"Para siempre"	Vicente fernández	
August 30	"Hasta el día de hoy"	Dareyes de La Sierra	
September 6	"Hasta el día de hoy"	Dareyes de La Sierra	
September 13	"Hasta el día de hoy"	Dareyes de La Sierra	
September 20	"Dame tu amor"	Alacranes Musical	
September 27	"Hasta el día de hoy"	Dareyes de La Sierra	
October 4	"La cumbia del río"	Los Pikadientes de Caborca	
October 11	"Dame tu amor"	Alacranes Musical	
October 18	"Dame tu amor"	Alacranes Musical	
October 25	"La cumbia del río"	Los Pikadientes de Caborca	
November 1	"Hasta EL FinalL"	"Banda Pequeños Musical	
November 8	"La cumbia del río"	Los Pikadientes de Caborca	
November 15	"Dame tu amor"	Alacranes Musical	
November 22	"La cumbia del río"	Los Pikadientes de Caborca	
November 29	"Dame tu amor"	Alacranes Musical	
December 6	"Dame tu amor"	Alacranes Musical	
December 13	"Y que quede claro"	La Arrolladora Banda el Limón de René Camacho	
December 20	"Dame tu amor"	Alacranes Musical	
December 27	"Y que quede claro"	La Arrolladora Banda el Limón de René Camacho	
