= Parece Sincera =

Single by El Roockie

from the album Semblante Urbano
- Released: 2007
- Recorded: 2007
- Genre: Reggaeton
- Length: 3:03
- Songwriter(s): Unknown
- Producer(s): Luny Tunes, Predikador

El Roockie singles chronology
"Parece Sincera" (2007)	"Martes de Galería" (2008)

"Parece Sincera" is the first single from El Roockie's 2007 album Semblante Urbano.

== Chart positions ==
Chart (2008)	Peak position
U.S. Billboard Latin Rhythm Airplay	17
