= Grammy Award for Best Regional Mexican Album =

Music award conferred from 2009 to 2011

The Grammy Award for Best Regional Mexican Album was awarded from 2009 to 2011. Previous to this field, Regional Mexican albums were awarded within the Best Mexican/Mexican American Album field.

The award was discontinued in 2012 in a major overhaul of Grammy categories. In 2012, this category merged with the Best Tejano Album category into the newly formed Best Regional Mexican or Tejano Album category.

Years reflect the year in which the Grammy Awards were presented, for works released in the previous year.

== Recipients ==
| Year | Winner | Nominations |
|---|---|---|
| 2011 | No award given. There were fewer than ten artists entered into this category, so per Academy rules The Recording Academy did not announce nominations or presented an award in this category this year. | |
| 2010 | Necesito de Tí by Vicente Fernández | Corazón Ranchero by Shaila Dúrcal; Compañeras by Mariachi Reyna de los Angeles; 10 Aniversario by Mariachi Divas de Cindy Shea; Pegadito al Corazón by Joan Sebastian |
| 2009 | Amor, Dolor y Lágrimas: Música Ranchera by Mariachi Los Camperos de Nati Cano (tie); Canciones de Amor by Mariachi Divas | Desde México: "Cumbia Cusinela" by Huichol Musical; Vámonos Pa'l Río by Los Pikadientes de Caborca; A Puro Dolor by Nadia |
