= Te Amo Tanto =

- R&B Version cover

Single by Flex

from the album La Evolución Romantic Style
- Released: May 16, 2009 (original version); August 9, 2009 (R&B version)
- Genre: Reggaeton, Latin Pop
- Length: 3:26 (Original version); 3:10 (R&B version)
- Label: EMI Latin
- Songwriter(s): Félix Danilo Gómez
- Producer(s): Predikador

Flex singles chronology
"Dime Si Te Vas Con Él" (2009)	"Te Amo Tanto" (2009)	"Besos De Amor" (2010)

"Te Amo Tanto" (English: I Love You So Much) is the official second and final single from Flex second studio album La Evolución Romantic Style. A R&B version was released later in 2009.

== Charts ==
Chart (2009)	Peak position
U.S. Billboard Hot Latin Songs	29
U.S. Billboard Latin Rhythm Airplay	6
U.S. Billboard Latin Tropical Airplay	15
