= Por Ti Baby =

Single by A.B. Quintanilla y Los Kumbia All Starz featuring Flex

from the album Planeta Kumbia
- Released: January 22, 2008
- Recorded: September 2007
- Genre: Cumbia
- Length: 3:10 (Single Version); 3:07 (Album Version); 3:38 (Remix Version)
- Label: EMI
- Songwriters: A.B. Quintanilla III; Luigi Giraldo
- Producers: A.B. Quintanilla III; Luigi Giraldo

A.B. Quintanilla y Los Kumbia All Starz singles chronology
"Mami/Anoche No Dormí" (2007)	"Por Ti Baby" (2008)	"Rica y Apretadita" (2008)

Flex singles chronology
"Sin Tu Amor" (2008)	"Por Ti Baby" (2008)	"Te Quiero (Remix)" (2008)

"Por Ti Baby" (English: "For You Baby") is a song by Mexican-American cumbia group A.B. Quintanilla y Los Kumbia All Starz featuring Panamanian singer Flex. It was released on January 22, 2008, as the first single from their second studio album Planeta Kumbia (2008).

== Remix ==
A remix called "Por Ti Baby (Regional Mexican Remix)" was made. It was released on the radio but never on a CD or as a digital download. Two versions of the remix was made with the same rhythm but with different singers. The first has Ricky Rick and Flex singing and the second has Ricky Rick and DJ Kane singing.

- "Por Ti Baby (Regional Mexican Remix)" (featuring Flex)
- "Por Ti Baby (Regional Mexican Remix)"

== Track listing ==
- Digital download
1. "Por Ti Baby" (featuring Flex) – 3:10

== Personnel ==
- Written by A.B. Quintanilla III and Luigi Giraldo
- Produced by A.B. Quintanilla III and Luigi Giraldo
- Lead vocals by Ricky Rick and Flex
- Background vocals by A.B. Quintanilla
- First remix lead vocals by Ricky Rick and Flex
- Second remix lead vocals by Ricky Rick and DJ Kane

== Charts ==
Chart (2008)	Peak position
US Billboard Hot Latin Songs	23
