= Besos de Amor =

Single by Flex featuring Ricky Rick

from the album Romantic Style Parte 3: Desde La Esencia
- Released: January 19, 2010
- Recorded: 2009–2010
- Genre: Latin pop, reggaeton
- Length: 3:38
- Label: EMI
- Songwriters: Félix Danilo Gómez, Reynold Martínez Esparza, Ricardo Ruiz Pérez
- Producer: Predikador

Flex singles chronology
"Te Amo Tanto" (2009)	"Besos de Amor" (2010)

Ricky Rick singles chronology
"Besos de Amor" (2010)

"Besos de Amor" (English: "Kisses of Love") is the lead single from Flex's third studio album Romantic Style Parte 3: Desde La Esencia. It features the Kumbia All Starz's member Ricky Rick. It was written by Reynold Martínez Esparza, Ricardo Ruiz Pérez and himself and produced by Predikador. The single was released on January 19, 2010, in Mexico and on January 26, 2010, in the United States through EMI.

== Music video ==
Flex and Ricky Rick in the music video for "Besos de Amor"

The music video was filmed on January 27, 2010, directed by Eduardo Duque and Andre Barren. The music video has the participation of the Mexican presenter, comedian Omar Chaparro and the Brazilian actress Ana Ángela. The video depicts a man dreaming awake throughout the plot to kiss his beloved, but everything goes wrong and it is not until the end that he can fulfill his dream. The video shows Flex and Rick singing without being involved in the plot of the video. It was first shown on February 23, 2010.

== Charts ==
The song entered the Billboard Hot Latin Songs at number 50 and the Latin Tropical Songs at number 39. It is also charted on the Latin Rhythm Songs at number 10, becoming his fourth top ten single on the chart and on the Latin Pop Songs at number 40. The song also entered the Venezuelan Record Report chart at number 121.

Chart (2010)	Peak position
US Billboard Hot Latin Songs	36
US Billboard Latin Rhythm Songs	7
US Billboard Latin Tropical Songs	26
US Latin Pop Airplay (Billboard)	40
Venezuelan Singles Chart	104
