= Escápate =

Single by Flex

from the album Te Quiero: Romantic Style In Da World
- Released: November 2007
- Recorded: 2007
- Genre: Reggaeton
- Length: 2:47
- Label: EMI Latin
- Songwriter: Félix Danilo Gómez
- Producer: Elian Davis/Predikador

Flex singles chronology
"Te Quiero" (2007)	"Escápate" (2007)	"Sin Tu Amor" (2008)

"Escápate" (English: Run Away) is the second single from Flex's studio album Te Quiero: Romantic Style In Da World released in November 2007. The song has been chosen as the album's first single, long before the album was released; however, it was later announced that "Te Quiero" had been chosen as the first single instead.

== Music video ==
Flex in the music video for "Escápate".

The music video was filmed in July, 2006 before to "Te Quiero" and "Sin Tu Amor" were filmed and released as a singles, but released to 2007, it was filmed at a nightclub in Panama directed by Music video directors Lucho Espada and Alvis González.

== Charts ==
Chart (2007–2008)	Peak position
U.S. Billboard Latin Rhythm Airplay	15
