= Romantic Style Parte 3: Desde La Esencia =

Studio album by Flex
- Released: March 30, 2010
- Recorded: 2009–2010
- Genre: Latin pop, reggae, reggaeton
- Length: 36:49
- Label: EMI Latin
- Producer: Predikador (executive); Félix D. Gómez

Flex chronology
La Evolución Romantic Style (2009)	Romantic Style Parte 3: Desde La Esencia (2010)	A Todo Romantic Style (2011)

Singles from Romantic Style Parte 3: Desde La Esencia
- 1. "Besos de Amor" Released: January 19, 2010

Romantic Style Parte 3: Desde La Esencia is the third studio album by Panamian singer-songwriter Flex. It was released on March 30, 2010 through EMI Latin. The album was preceded by the title single "Besos de Amor" which it features Kumbia All Starz's member Ricky Rick.

== Track list ==
No.	Title	Writer(s)	Length
1.	"Quiero Besarte"	Félix Gómez	4:00
2.	"Se Acabó Mi Vida"	Félix Gómez	4:23
3.	"No Siento Tu Amor"	Félix Gómez	3:27
4.	"Si Tu Te Vas"	Félix Gómez	3:35
5.	"Besos de Amor" (featuring Ricky Rick)	Félix Gómez, Reynold Martínez Esparza, Ricardo Ruiz Pérez	3:38
6.	"Caliente"	Félix Gómez	3:27
7.	"Nena"	Félix Gómez	3:45
8.	"Un Segundo Verla" (featuring Lil Phas)	Félix Gómez	4:03
9.	"Esperándote"	Félix Gómez, Víctor Delgado	3:20
10.	"Entre Mis Brazos"	Félix Gómez	3:11

== Chart performance ==
The album debuted at number 25 on the Billboard Top Latin Albums, becoming his lowest debut on the U.S. charts compared to his previous albums, the next week, the album climbed 5 places to number 20.

Chart (2010)	Peak position
US Billboard Top Latin Albums	20
