= Vives En Mí =

Studio album by Flex
- Released: August 21, 2012
- Recorded: 2011–2012
- Genre: Latin pop, reggae, reggaeton
- Length: 36:02
- Label: EMI Latin

Flex chronology
A Todo Romantic Style (2011)	Vives En Mí (2012)	Seduction (2015)

Singles from Vives En Mí
- 1. "No Hay Nadie Más" Released: May 18, 2012; 2. "Te Invito al Woi" Released: October 25, 2012; 3. "Alegras Mi Vida" Released: February 23, 2013

Vives En Mí is the fourth studio album by Panamian singer-songwriter Flex. It was released on August 21, 2012 through EMI Latin. Their first single is titled No Hay Nadie Más and was released on May 18, 2012.

== Track list ==
=== Standard Edition ===
1. "Vives en Mí" – 3:28
2. "Alegras Mi Vida" (featuring Farruko) – 4:10
3. "Me Enamoré" – 3:30
4. "Te Invito al Woi" (featuring Mr. Phillips) – 3:37
5. "La Niña de Mis Sueños" (featuring Alex Pro) – 2:44
6. "Dance With You" – 3:39
7. "Solo Tú" – 3:23
8. "Bonita" (featuring Fanny Lu) – 4:18
9. "Yo Te Amaré" – 3:22
10. "No Hay Nadie Más" – 3:50

==== iTunes Bonus Track ====
- This song is only available on iTunes, it is not included in the physical CD
11. "Dile Amor" — 2:55
