= Seduction (Flex album) =

Studio album by Flex
- Released: November 6, 2015
- Recorded: 2013–2015
- Genre: Reggae, reggaeton, Latin pop, bachata
- Length: 35:54
- Label: Romantic Style LLC, Sony Music
- Producer: Félix D. Gómez (ejecutivo), Chris Jeday, Gaby Music, Seven The Producer, Makinologo

Flex chronology
Vives En Mí (2012)	Seduction (2015)

Singles from Seduction
- 1. "No Puedo Dejar de Amarte" Released: February 13, 2014; 2. "A Bailar" Released: October 8, 2014; 3. "Nadie Como Tú" Released: September 25, 2015; 4. "Inmortal" Released: January 6, 2016

Seduction is the fifth studio album by Panamian singer-songwriter Flex. It was released on November 6, 2015, through Sony Music. The single Nadie Como Tú was peaked at 20 in Billboard Latin Pop Airplay. Currently, the artist is promoting his latest single "Immortal" and for March 2016 will release their official videoclip.

== Track listing ==
No.	Title	Writer(s)	Length
1.	"Nadie Como Tú"	Félix Gómez, Carlos E. Ortiz Rivera, Luis E. Ortiz Rivera, José Ángel Torres	4:01
2.	"Quiero Samba"	Félix Gómez	3:20
3.	"Inmortal"	Félix Gómez	3:18
4.	"Que Viva el Amor"	Félix Gómez	3:48
5.	"Se Mueve Sexy" (featuring Kafu Banton)	Zico Garibaldi, Félix Gómez	3:10
6.	"Una Noche Más"	Félix Gómez	3:25
7.	"No Puedo Dejar de Amarte"	Félix Gómez	3:29
8.	"Me Olvidaste"	Omar Alfanno, Félix Gómez	3:57
9.	"Porqué a Mi"	Félix Gómez	3:52
10.	"A Bailar"	Félix Gómez	3:34
