= Planeta Kumbia =

Studio album by A.B. Quintanilla y Los Kumbia All Starz
- Released: March 4, 2008
- Recorded: September 2007–January 11, 2008
- Genre: Cumbia
- Length: 49:24
- Label: EMI Latin
- Producer: A.B. Quintanilla; Luigi Giraldo

A.B. Quintanilla y Los Kumbia All Starz chronology
Ayer Fue Kumbia Kings, Hoy Es Kumbia All Starz (2006)	Planeta Kumbia (2008)	La Vida de un Genio (2010)

Singles from Planeta Kumbia
- 1. "Por Ti Baby" Released: January 22, 2008; 2. "Rica y Apretadita" Released: March 20, 2008

Planeta Kumbia (English: Kumbia Planet) is the second studio album by Mexican-American cumbia group A.B. Quintanilla y Los Kumbia All Starz and the sixth studio album by Mexican-American musician A.B. Quintanilla. It was released on March 4, 2008 by EMI Latin. Production on the album was handled by A.B. Quintanilla and Luigi Giraldo.

The album peaked at 4 on the US Billboard Top Latin Albums chart and 2 the US Billboard Latin Pop Albums. Two singles were released from the album, "Por Ti Baby" and "Rica y Apretadita".

== Background ==
A.B. Quintanilla started working on the album during 2007 with the album release expected to be February 2008. During an interview, A.B. Quintanilla and Pee Wee revealed they were working with producers Luny Tunes on new material. Recording sessions for the album lasted from September 2007 to January 2008. On February 1, 2008, it was announced lead singer Pee Wee, as well as singers Roque Morales and Memo Morales, had left the Kumbia All Starz in January. This left Ricky Rick as only singer for the band. The album's release date was moved from February 26 to March 4, 2008. Many of the material Pee Wee had recorded for the album was left off, with the exception of one song. The track Pee Wee had recorded with producers Luny Tunes, "Carita Bonita", was given to the reggaeton duo Erre XI and was a released as single on February 19, 2008, with Pee Wee receiving solo featured artist credit, for their album, Luny Tunes Presents: Erre XI. In February 2008, it was announced DJ Kane, who was the original lead singer for the Kumbia Kings, would rejoin A.B. Quintanilla and become the lead singer for Kumbia All Starz.

== Singles ==
"Por Ti Baby" was released as the album's lead single on January 22, 2008.

"Rica y Apretadita" was released as the album's second single on May 20, 2008

"Vuelve" was scheduled to be the album's third single but was cancelled.

== Promotion ==
Due to Pee Wee, Roque Morales, and Memo Morales leaving the band, much of the promotion had to rely on the tracks recorded by Ricky Rick. All singles were songs which had Rick Rick performing. DJ Kane joined the band in February 2008, after the album recording sessions were completed. DJ Kane would re-record two songs, "Por Ti Baby", replacing featured artist Flex's vocals, and "No Me Haces Falta", replacing Pee Wee's vocals, to promote the album. A.B. Quintanilla and the Kumbia All Starz, with new member DJ Kane, were scheduled to perform at the Premio Lo Nuestro 2008 on February 21, 2008. It was promoted as A.B. Quintanilla's first televised live performance in the United States since 2005 and the awards show would also feature a performance by Quintanilla's ex-bandmate, Cruz Martinez, and his band, Los Super Reyes. Due to visa problems, Ricky Rick wasn't able to arrive and Kumbia All Starz' performance was cancelled. They were scheduled to perform the single "Por Ti Baby" with guest artist Flex. In March 2008, A.B. Quintanilla and the Kumbia All Starz, as well as Melissa Jiménez, appeared on Cristina Saralegui's El Show del Cristina to promote the album, which featured interviews with A.B. Quintanilla, DJ Kane, Ricky Rick, and Melissa Jiménez. Quintanilla discussed the album as well as Pee Wee's departure. They performed the songs "Me Pase de Copas" and "Rica y Apretadita". Melissa Jiménez became a touring member of Kumbia All Starz and performed live with the group in concerts and television shows during the year to help promote the album. A.B. Quintanilla and the Kumbia All Starz with Melissa Jiménez performed "Rica y Apretadita" at the 2008 Latin Billboard Music Awards on April 10, 2008. On the same night, they were interviewed and performed "Por Ti Baby", "No Me Haces Falta", "Me Pase de Copas", and "Rica y Apretadita", for mun2's Vivo show for a special which aired on June 21, 2008. To promote Planeta Kumbia, A.B. Quintanilla and the Kumbia All Starz would go on tour, with DJ Kane on lead vocals, Ricky Rick on secondary vocals, and Melissa Jiménez on guest vocals for "Rica y Apretadita". The concert format would consist of DJ Kane and Ricky Rick performing songs together, usually starting with "Por Ti Baby", as well as classic hits from the Kumbia Kings era, such as "Shhh!", "No Tengo Dinero", "Boom Boom", and newer songs from the Kumbia All Starz albums, Planeta Kumbia and Ayer Fue Kumbia Kings, Hoy Es Kumbia All Starz, such as "Me Pase de Copas", "Parece Que Va a Llover", "Mami", and would usually end with Ricky Rick and Melissa Jiménez performing "Rica y Apretadita".

This songs were recorded to promote the album but aren't on the album. They were either released on the radio or played live in concerts. "Por Ti Baby (Regional Mexican Remix)" has Ricky Rick and Flex singing the song but another version was made that has Ricky Rick and DJ Kane singing the song. "No Me Haces Falta" originally has Pee Wee singing the song but another version was made that has DJ Kane singing the song.

- "Por Ti Baby (Regional Mexican Remix)" (featuring Flex) (Vocals by Ricky Rick and Flex)
- "Por Ti Baby (Regional Mexican Remix)" (Vocals by Ricky Rick and DJ Kane)
- "No Me Haces Falta" (Vocals by DJ Kane)

== Track listing ==
No.	Title	Writer(s)	Length
1.	"Intro"		0:40
2.	"Por Ti Baby" (featuring Flex)	A.B. Quintanilla III, Luigi Giraldo	3:07
3.	"Felicidades"	Quintanilla III, Giraldo	3:31
4.	"Gracias" (featuring Yuri)	Quintanilla III, Giraldo	3:49
5.	"A Puro Grito" (featuring Amaury Gutiérrez)	Amaury Gutiérrez	3:40
6.	"No Me Haces Falta"	Eliecer Ruben Edey Joseph	3:01
7.	"Bésame"	Quintanilla III, Giraldo	3:10
8.	"Rica y Apretadita" (featuring Melissa Jiménez)	Edgardo A. "El General" Franco	4:01
9.	"Vuelve" (featuring Vicentico and La Mala Rodríguez)	Cachorro López, Sebastian Chon, Vicentico, María "La Mala" Rodríguez	3:38
10.	"Juegas Conmigo"	Gutiérrez	3:09
11.	"Laberinto"	Quintanilla III, Robert "BoBBo" Gómez, Giraldo	2:55
12.	"Planeta Kumbia"	Quintanilla III, Giraldo	3:35
13.	"Dinero"	Quintanilla III, Giraldo, Roque Morales, Ricardo Ruiz Pérez	3:47
14.	"Ya No Te Quiero"	Quintanilla III, Morales, Giraldo	3:39
15.	"Me Pase de Copas"	Quintanilla III, Giraldo	3:42

Notes

- DJ Kane joined the group and became the lead singer in February 2008, after the album recording sessions ended and a month before the album's release. DJ Kane re-recorded vocals for "Por Ti Baby" and "No Me Haces Falta", and toured with Kumbia All Starz to promote the album.

== Personnel ==
Kumbia All Starz

- A.B. Quintanilla III – bass guitar, backing vocals, composer, producer
- Jason "DJ Kane" Cano – vocals (re-recorded "Por Ti Baby" and "No Me Haces Falta" for promotion)
- Ricardo "Ricky Rick" Ruiz Pérez – vocals
- Irvin "Pee Wee" Salinas – vocals
- Roque Morales Diosdado – vocals
- Memo Morales Diosdado – vocals
- Chris Pérez – guitar
- Nick Banda – keyboards
- Joey Jiménez – drums
- Robert "BoBBo" Gomez III – keyboards
- "El Animal" Noe "Gipper" Nieto, Jr. – accordion
- Luigi Giraldo – keyboards, producer
- Ramón Ruiz – percussion

Additional musicians

- Flex – vocals
- Amaury Gutiérrez – vocals
- Melissa Jiménez – vocals
- La Mala Rodríguez – vocals
- Vicentico – vocals
- Yuri – vocals

== Charts ==
=== Weekly charts ===
Chart (2008)	Peak position
US Billboard 200	148
US Billboard Top Latin Albums	4
US Billboard Latin Pop Albums	2

=== Year-end charts ===
Chart (2008)	Position
US Billboard Top Latin Albums	36
US Billboard Latin Pop Albums	13
