= Dime Si Te Vas Con Él =

2009 single by Flex featuring Mr. Saik

- US Promo Cover

Single by Flex featuring Mr. Saik

from the album La Evolución Romantic Style
- Released: January 27, 2009
- Genre: Reggaeton, Latin Pop, vallenato
- Length: 3:55
- Label: EMI Latin
- Songwriter(s): Félix Danilo Gómez
- Producer(s): Predikador

Flex featuring Mr. Saik singles chronology
"Te Quiero (Remix)" (2008)	"Dime Si Te Vas Con Él" (2009)	"Te Amo Tanto" (2009)

Alternative Cover
- Non US Promo Cover

"Dime Si Te Vas Con Él" (English: Tell Me If You Go With Him) is a song by Panamanian singer Flex. It was released on January 27, 2009, as the second single from his second studio album La Evolución Romantic Style (2009). The song features Panamanian singer Mr. Saik. "Dime Si Te Vas Con Él" quickly placed in the top positions globally, following the success of their debut single "Te Quiero". On March 26, 2009 Flex and Pee Wee sang this song along with "Escápate" in Premios Lo Nuestro 2009.

== Music video ==
The music video was filmed in Panama. It tells the story of a humble employee, played by Flex, who after having an affair with a beautiful girl in town, goes away to be conquered by the love of a rich man.

== Track listing ==
Promo CD (Released on November 29, 2008)

1. "Dime Si Te Vas Con Él" (US Version) - 3:56

== Charts ==
Chart (2009)	Peak position
U.S. Billboard Hot Latin Tracks	1
U.S. Billboard Latin Pop Airplay	32
U.S. Billboard Latin Tropical Airplay	19
U.S. Billboard Bubbling Under Hot 100 Singles	20
