= Rica y Apretadita =

1995 song by El General featuring Anayka

Single by El General featuring Anayka

from the album Es Mundial
- Released: 1995
- Recorded: 1994
- Genre: Reggaeton
- Length: 4:01
- Label: RCA
- Songwriter: El General

"Rica y Apretadita" (English: "Delicious and Tight") is a song by Panamanian reggae singer El General, featuring Anayka, released in 1995.

== Certifications ==
| Region | Certification | Certified units/sales |
|---|---|---|
| United States (RIAA) | 7× Platinum (Latin) | 420,000^{‡} |
^{‡} Sales+streaming figures based on certification alone.

== Kumbia All Starz version ==
"Rica y Apretadita"

Single by A.B. Quintanilla y Los Kumbia All Starz featuring Melissa Jiménez

from the album Planeta Kumbia
- Released: 20 May 2008
- Recorded: January 2008
- Genre: Cumbia
- Length: 4:01
- Label: EMI Latin
- Songwriter: El General
- Producers: A.B. Quintanilla III; Luigi Giraldo

A.B. Quintanilla y Los Kumbia All Starz singles chronology
| "Por Ti Baby" (2008) | "Rica y Apretadita" (2008) | "Hipnótika" (2010) |

Melissa Jiménez singles chronology
| "Selena" (2007) | "Rica y Apretadita" (2008) | "Touch Your Button" (2008) |

"Rica y Apretadita" was later cover by Mexican-American cumbia group A.B. Quintanilla y Los Kumbia All Starz, featuring Melissa Jiménez. It was released on 20 May 2008, as the second single from their second studio album, Planeta Kumbia.

=== Personnel ===
- Written by Edgardo A. "El General" Franco
- Produced by A.B. Quintanilla III and Luigi Giraldo
- Lead vocals by Ricky Rick and Melissa Jiménez
- Background vocals by A.B. Quintanilla III

=== Charts ===
| Chart (2008) | Peak position |
|---|---|
| US Billboard Hot Latin Songs | 50 |
| US Billboard Latin Rhythm Airplay | 17 |
| US Billboard Regional Mexican Songs | 34 |
