= Semblante Urbano =

Studio album by El Roockie
- Released: February 12, 2008; March 2009 (re-edition)
- Recorded: 2006–2008
- Genre: Reggaeton
- Label: Machete Music; Mas Flow Inc.
- Producer: Luny Tunes (Exec.); Predikador; Miki "La Mano Bionica"; Noriega; Tainy; Yazid & Gaby

El Roockie chronology
| Humanidad (2005) | Semblante Urbano (2008) | TBA El Roockie's 7th studio album (2009) |

Singles from Semblante Urbano
- 1. "Parece Sincera" Released: 2007; 2. "Martes de Galería" Released: 2008; 3. "Sigue Bailando Mi Amor" Released: 2008

Semblante Urbano is the name of the sixth album from El Roockie and the first one under Mas Flow Inc. The album was released on February 12, 2008. The album combines the dimensions of his experiences with urban rhythms such as reggaeton, dancehall, hip hop & reggae. It was considered one of the most anticipated albums in the reggaeton in the Hispanophone world. Luny of the production duo said in an interview that Banista "...has lyrics that can cut veins." Semblante Urbano: La Otra Cara De La Calle is the re-edition of the original album set to be released sometime in 2009. This re-edition will contain the original 14 tracks from the standard edition plus 2 remixes and an additional 5 new songs. It will also contain a DVD with the music videos from the singles plus an interview with El Roockie.

== Track listing ==
=== Standard Edition ===
| # | Title | Production credits | Length |
|---|---|---|---|
| 1 | "Intro - Semblante Urbano" (featuring Mr. Phillips) | | 2:28 |
| 2 | "Parece Sincera" | Luny Tunes & Predikador | 3:03 |
| 3 | "Tell Me Why" | Miki "La Mano Bionica" & Noriega | 3:00 |
| 4 | "Martes de Galería" (featuring De La Ghetto) | Predikador | 4:27 |
| 5 | "Vengo de la Casa de Ella (Semblante)" | Miki "La Mano Bionica" | 2:53 |
| 6 | "Delirando" (featuring Baby Ranks) | Sensei | 5:03 |
| 7 | "Sigue Bailando Mi Amor" | Predikador | 3:23 |
| 8 | "Por Ahi Dicen" (featuring Mr. Phillips & Yazid) | Tainy | 4:43 |
| 9 | "Volverás" | Miki "La Mano Bionica" | 3:56 |
| 10 | "Me Fallaste" (featuring Deevani) | Predikador | 3:37 |
| 11 | "Vigilia de un Santo" | Luny Tunes & Tainy | 3:18 |
| 12 | "Ayer Soñaba (Barrio de Chacales)" | | 4:03 |
| 13 | "Dejame Oirte" | Miki "La Mano Bionica" | 2:56 |
| 14 | "Giales del Ghetto" | Luny Tunes, Yazid & Gaby | 3:24 |
