= Revelation Lyrics =

Studio album by El Roockie
- Released: November 1999
- Recorded: 1992–1999
- Genre: Reggaeton
- Producer: Irving "D´Blasio" Dominguez; Frank Durham; Elián Davis and Jans Ortega

El Roockie chronology
Revelation Lyrics (1999)	Máquina de Lírica (2001)

Singles from Revelation Lyrics
- 1. "Más violencia no" Released: 1992; 2. "Quien es el buay" Released: 1993; 3. "Adios al amigo" Released: 1995

Revelation Lyrics is the name of the first album from El Roockie. The album was released in November 1999.

#	Title	Duration
1	"Introducción"	0:26
2	"Claro de vista"	3:23
3	"Rapeadores saineando"	3:54
4	"Más violencia no"	3:50
5	"Quien es el buay"	3:00
6	"Roboteando"	2:44
7	"Adios al amigo"	2:36
8	"Anayansi"	2:54
9	"Batuzai"	2:33
10	"Read my lips"	1:48
11	"My enemy 1"	2:27
12	"My enemy 2"	3:52
13	"Se acabó el bad boy"	2:15
14	"Buay del barrio"	3:44
15	"Niños de la calle"	3:16
16	"Canto a la humanidad"	3:19
17	"Darte su amor"	4:35
18	"Si le dije que la ame"	2:59
19	"Chica indicada"	4:09
20	"Chica en estado"	3:16
21	"Niño de mi alma"	4:44
22	"La verdad"	3:05
