= List of Billboard Regional Mexican Albums number ones of 2009 =

The Regional Mexican Albums, published in Billboard magazine, is a record chart that features Latin music sales information for regional styles of Mexican music. This data are compiled by Nielsen SoundScan from a sample that includes music stores, music departments at department stores and verifiable sales from concert venues in the United States.

== Albums ==
Issue date	Album	Artist(s)	Reference(s)
January 3	Primera Fila	Vicente Fernández	
January 10	Primera Fila	Vicente Fernández	
January 17	Primera Fila	Vicente Fernández	
January 24	Primera Fila	Vicente Fernández	
January 31	Primera Fila	Vicente Fernández	
February 7	Para Siempre	Vicente Fernández	
February 14	Necesito Más de Ti	Duelo	
February 21	Necesito Más de Ti	Duelo	
February 28	Para Siempre †	Vicente Fernández	
March 7	Quiereme Mas	Patrulla 81	
March 14	Quiereme Mas	Patrulla 81	
March 21	Quiereme Mas	Patrulla 81	
March 28	Quiereme Mas	Patrulla 81	
April 4	Quiereme Mas	Patrulla 81	
April 11	Más Adelante	La Arrolladora Banda El Limón	
April 18	Más Adelante	La Arrolladora Banda El Limón	
April 25	Más Adelante	La Arrolladora Banda El Limón	
May 2	Más Adelante	La Arrolladora Banda El Limón	
May 9	Más Adelante	La Arrolladora Banda El Limón	
May 16	Comprendeme	German Montero	
May 23	Almas Gemelas	El Trono de México	
May 30	Almas Gemelas	El Trono de México	
June 6	Yo No Canto, Pero Lo Intentamos	Espinoza Paz	
June 13	Yo No Canto, Pero Lo Intentamos	Espinoza Paz	
June 20	Yo No Canto, Pero Lo Intentamos	Espinoza Paz	
June 27	Yo No Canto, Pero Lo Intentamos	Espinoza Paz	
July 4	Yo No Canto, Pero Lo Intentamos	Espinoza Paz	
July 11	La Jefa	Alicia Villarreal	
July 18	La Jefa	Alicia Villarreal	
July 25	Necesito de Ti	Vicente Fernández	
August 1	Necesito de Ti	Vicente Fernández	
August 8	Necesito de Ti	Vicente Fernández	
August 15	Avanzando En La Vida	Los Creadorez del Pasito Duranguense de Alfredo Ramírez	
August 22	Necesito de Ti	Vicente Fernández	
August 29	Necesito de Ti	Vicente Fernández	
September 5	Contigo Para Siempre	Conjunto Atardecer	
September 12	Pegadito Al Corazon	Joan Sebastian	
September 19	Contigo Para Siempre	Conjunto Atardecer	
September 26	La Granja	Los Tigres del Norte	
October 3	La Granja	Los Tigres del Norte	
October 10	La Granja	Los Tigres del Norte	
October 17	La Granja	Los Tigres del Norte	
October 24	La Granja	Los Tigres del Norte	
October 31	La Granja	Los Tigres del Norte	
November 7	La Granja	Los Tigres del Norte	
November 14	La Granja	Los Tigres del Norte	
November 21	Más de Marco Antonio Solís	Marco Antonio Solís	
November 28	Más de Marco Antonio Solís	Marco Antonio Solís	
December 5	En Vivo Desde Culiacan	Larry Hernandez	
December 12	Sin Ti No Vive	Patrulla 81	
December 19	La Gran Señora	Jenni Rivera	
December 26	Dos Mundos: Evolución + Tradición	Alejandro Fernández	
