= La Evolución Romantic Style =

Studio album by Flex
- Released: January 27, 2009
- Recorded: 2008
- Genre: Pop Latino, reggaeton
- Length: 44:16 (Standard Edition); 53:41 (Special Edition)
- Label: EMI
- Producer: Predikador

Flex chronology
Te Quiero: Romantic Style In Da World (2007)	La Evolución Romantic Style (2009)	Romantic Style Parte 3: Desde La Esencia (2010)

La Evolución Romantic Style: Special Edition

Singles from La Evolución Romantic Style
- 1. "Te Dejaré" Released: January 2008; 2. "Dime Si Te Vas Con Él" Released: January 27, 2009; 3. "Te Amo Tanto" Released: May 16, 2009

La Evolución Romantic Style is the second studio album by Panamanian singer Flex. It was released on January 27, 2009. A special edition was also released on the same day. It was nominated for a Lo Nuestro Award for Urban Album of the Year. It also received a nomination for the Billboard Latin Music Award for Latin Rhythm Album of the Year in 2010.

== Track listing ==
=== Standard edition ===
No.	Title	Writer(s)	Length
1.	"Te Dejaré"	Félix Danilo Gómez	3:56
2.	"Vete"	Félix Danilo Gómez	4:45
3.	"Dónde Estás"	Félix Danilo Gómez	3:16
4.	"Desde Que Te Vi"	Félix Danilo Gómez	3:39
5.	"Te Amo Tanto"	Félix Danilo Gómez	3:28
6.	"Dime Si Te Vas Con Él" (featuring Fernando "Mr. Saik" Cabrera)	Félix Danilo Gómez, Fernando Cabrera	3:55
7.	"Ven"	Félix Danilo Gómez	3:44
8.	"Bésame Otra Vez"	Félix Danilo Gómez	3:41
9.	"Acércate"	Félix Danilo Gómez	3:22
10.	"Sigues Siendo"	Félix Danilo Gómez	4:00
11.	"Ayer Te Vi"	Félix Danilo Gómez	2:47
12.	"El Tiempo Se Va"	Félix Danilo Gómez	3:43

=== Special edition ===
No.	Title	Writer(s)	Length
1.	"Te Dejaré"	Félix Danilo Gómez	3:56
2.	"Vete"	Félix Danilo Gómez	4:45
3.	"Dónde Estás"	Félix Danilo Gómez	3:16
4.	"Desde Que Te Vi"	Félix Danilo Gómez	3:39
5.	"Te Amo Tanto"	Félix Danilo Gómez	3:28
6.	"Dime Si Te Vas Con Él" (featuring Fernando "Mr. Saik" Cabrera)	Félix Danilo Gómez, Fernando Cabrera	3:55
7.	"Ven"	Félix Danilo Gómez	3:44
8.	"Bésame Otra Vez"	Félix Danilo Gómez	3:41
9.	"Acércate"	Félix Danilo Gómez	3:22
10.	"Sigues Siendo"	Félix Danilo Gómez	4:00
11.	"Ayer Te Vi"	Félix Danilo Gómez	2:47
12.	"El Tiempo Se Va"	Félix Danilo Gómez	3:43
13.	"Te Quiero (Spanglish Version)" (featuring Belinda)	Félix Danilo Gómez, Billy Mann	3:17
14.	"Te Quiero (Acoustic Version)" (featuring Belinda)	Félix Danilo Gómez	2:44
15.	"El Burrito Sabanero"	Hugo Blanco	3:25

- Tracks #13–15 are only included in the special edition of the CD.

== Charts ==
=== Weekly charts ===
Chart (2009)	Peak position
US Billboard 200	104
US Top Latin Albums (Billboard)	3
US Latin Rhythm Albums (Billboard)	1

=== Year-end charts ===
Chart (2009)	Position
US Top Latin Albums (Billboard)	22
