= Vámonos Pa'l Río =

Studio album by Los Pikadientes de Caborca
- Released: August 26, 2008
- Genre: Norteño
- Label: Norte

Los Pikadientes de Caborca chronology
| Vámonos Pa'l Río (2008) | La Tenía Más Grande (2009) |

Vámonos Pa'l Río (Eng.: Let's Go To The River) is the title of a studio album released by norteño music band Los Pikadientes de Caborca. This album became their first number-one set on the Billboard Top Latin Albums. It received a nomination for Best Regional Mexican Album at the Grammy Awards of 2009.

== Track listing ==
The track listing from Billboard.com

| No. | Title | Writer(s) | Length |
|---|---|---|---|
| 1. | "La Cumbia del Río" | Francisco González Terrazas | 1:46 |
| 2. | "La Machaca" | González | 2:25 |
| 3. | "El Chapulín" | González | 2:10 |
| 4. | "La Cumbia de Caborca" | González | 2:07 |
| 5. | "Agujetas de Color de Rosa" | Mike Grant | 2:51 |
| 6. | "I Love You (Te Amo)" | Rocco Damian | 3:08 |
| 7. | "Quiúbole" | José Juan Segura | 2:02 |
| 8. | "La Botella" | Romualdo Tadeu Willis, Eleonor Sacramento | 2:41 |
| 9. | "Ocuando Anduve Como Perro" | González | 2:49 |
| 10. | "Macorina Pon Pon" | Francisco Mandujano Hernández | 2:15 |
| 11. | "El Perro" | González | 1:45 |
| 12. | "La Cumbia del Río [Banda]" | González | 3:04 |

== Charts ==
| Chart (2008) | Peak position |
|---|---|
| US Billboard 200 | 52 |
| US Top Latin Albums (Billboard) | 1 |
| US Regional Mexican Albums (Billboard) | 1 |

== Sales and certifications ==
| Region | Certification | Certified units/sales |
|---|---|---|
| United States (RIAA) | Platinum (Latin) | 100,000^{^} |
^{^} Shipments figures based on certification alone.
