= Te Quiero: Romantic Style in da World =

Te Quiero: Romantic Style In Da World

Studio album by Flex
- Released: September 21, 2007
- Recorded: 2007
- Genre: Pop Latino, Reggaeton
- Length: 50:23
- Label: EMI
- Producer: Elian Davis, Predikador

Flex chronology
Te Quiero: Romantic Style In Da World (2007)	La Evolución Romantic Style (2009)

Singles from Te Quiero: Romantic Style In Da World
- 1. "Te Quiero" Released: September 28, 2007; 2. "Escápate" Released: November 2007; 3. "Sin Tu Amor" Released: January 2008; 4. "Te Quiero (Remix)" Released: March 13, 2008; 5. "Gritarle" Released: August 2008 (Argentinian release only)

Te Quiero (English: I Love You), also known as Te Quiero: Romantic Style In Da World, is the debut album by Panamian singer-songwriter Flex. It was released in late September 21, 2007 in Mexico and Panama and three months later on December 4, 2007 in United States, peaking at number-one in those three countries. In 2008, it was nominated for a Latin Grammy Award for Best Urban Music Album, which was awarded to Wisin & Yandel's Los Extraterrestres; however, the lead single from this album, "Te Quiero", won the Latin Grammy Award for Best Urban Song. Te Quiero also was nominated for a Lo Nuestro Award for Urban Album of the Year. It won the Billboard Latin Music Award for Latin Rhythm Album of the Year in 2009.

"Te Quiero" was on the Latin Billboard charts all of 2008. It was No. 1 for 20 weeks. Flex performed this song on shows such as the Latin Grammys 2008, Premios Telehit 2008, Cristina, Premios Juventud 2008, One Nation, Vivo, Pepsi Musica, and many more. Thanks to his huge hit, Flex won many awards, received more recognition, and became popular worldwide.

== Reception ==
Professional ratings
Review scores
Source	Rating
Allmusic	2/5 stars

Jason Birchmeier gave the album two stars. He felt that Flex's vocals were "fair at best" while terrible at "Si No Te Tengo". He also criticized the album as being "short on good songs" and that the romantic feel "becomes increasingly overbearing as the album progresses."

== Track listing ==
The information from Billboard.

=== Standard edition ===
No.	Title	Writer(s)	Length
1.	"Te Quiero"	Félix Danilo Gómez	3:19
2.	"Sin Tu Amor" (featuring Alex Pro)		3:29
3.	"Desde Lejos (Versión Reggae)"		3:11
4.	"Escápate"		2:51
5.	"Me Muero"		2:55
6.	"Si No Te Tengo"		3:55
7.	"Voy A Olvidarte"	Félix Danilo Gómez, Guido Hernán Mosquera	3:37
8.	"Dime"		3:55
9.	"Déjala" (featuring Duende)		3:36
10.	"También La Quiero A Ella"		3:35
11.	"Eras Una Niña" (featuring Japanese)	Félix Danilo Gómez, Levit Zambrano	3:04
12.	"Gritarle"		3:04
13.	"Quién No Llora Por Amor"		3:14
14.	"Tus Recuerdos (La Balada De Nigga)"		3:21
15.	"Luna"		3:17

=== Fan edition ===
A fan edition was released including an extended playlist, which contained the same track listing as the standard edition plus three new versions of his hit single "Te Quiero", along with a DVD with music videos and bonus features. This edition includes versions with Belinda, a DVD with music videos and bonus features, the original and the spanglish version with Belinda have a music video included in this fan edition.

No.	Title	Length
16.	"Te Quiero (Spanglish Version)" (featuring Belinda)	3:19
17.	"Te Quiero (Acoustic Version)" (featuring Belinda)	3:29
18.	"Te Quiero (Luigi Giraldo Remix)"	3:59

=== DVD track listing ===
1. Menu
2. "Te Quiero" - Music video
3. "Sin Tu Amor" - Music video
4. "Escápate" - Music video
5. "Te Quiero" - Karaoke
6. "Te Quiero (Spanglish)" featuring Belinda - Music video
7. México 2008 Tour
8. United States, Colombia and Argentina Tour

== Chart performance ==
Chart (2007/2008)	Peak position
Mexico AMPROFON Albums Chart	1
U.S. Billboard Latin Rhythm Albums	1
U.S. Billboard Top Latin Albums	1
U.S. Billboard 200	70

== Sales and certifications ==
Region	Certification	Certified units/sales
Mexico (AMPROFON)	2× Platinum	160,000^{^}
^{^} Shipments figures based on certification alone.
