= El General =

Panamanian rapper (born 1969)

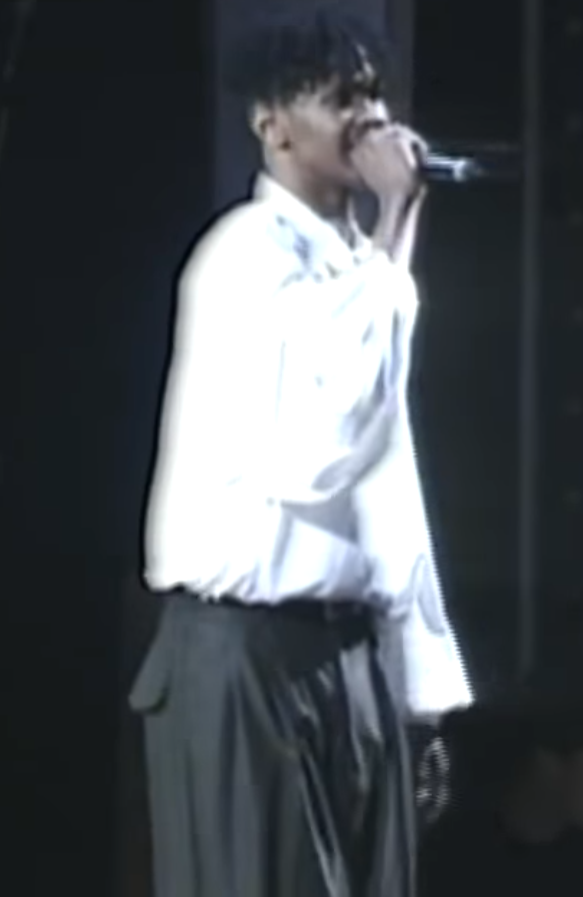
- El General at the 1993 Viña del Mar Festival

Background information
- Born: 27 September 1969 (age 56); Panama City, Panama
- Genres: Reggae en Español; dancehall; reggae
- Occupation: Rapper
- Instrument: Vocals
- Years active: 1990–2004
- Labels: RCA International; BMG; Rodven; PolyGram; Polydor; Lideres
- Website: elgenerallegacy.com

Edgardo Armando Franco (born 27 September 1969), better known as El General, is a Panamanian former rapper considered by some to be one of the fathers of reggae en Español.

During the early 1990s, he was one of the artists who initiated the Spanish-language dancehall variety of reggae music. Early examples of this were the international and somewhat mainstream songs, "Te Ves Buena" and "Tu Pum Pum". “Tu Pum Pum" emerged after a friend of El General invited him to collaborate with a Jamaican producer that was searching for a “different sound in Panama." Both songs, performed in Spanish deejaying style, were very successful in North America. After getting his foot in the door of the commercial market, many other Spanish-language dancehall reggae artists became famous in the mainstream as well. He has a unique, easy to listen to style of dance music and has produced many well-known songs all over Latin America.

El General retired from music in 2004 and became one of Jehovah's Witnesses.

== Early history ==
El General began singing and composing songs at the age of 12 in his home in Río Abajo, Panama. El General is of Jamaican descent.

Jamaicans, Bajans, Trinidadians and other West Indians moved to Panama to fill the need of labor for the construction of the Panama Canal. As laborers on the Canal they were met with harsh conditions like low wages and terrible living conditions. Black Panamanians of Caribbean descent (antillanos) were also mistreated and segregated based on their Caribbean ancestry and were unable to assimilate to national Panamanian culture.

While El General was growing up Spanish Reggae as a genre began to rise in Panama. In the 1980s, Spanish Reggae in Panama was the use of riddims that were popular in Jamaica and the rapping/singing of direct translations on the same beat. As Panamaians of Caribbean descent the use of Jamaican riddims was anti-establishment and enforced what Wayne Marshall says, “ ‘provides a telling set of examples of how the meanings of Jamaican reggae continue to resonate in Panama, even after translation into Spanish’ ” The use of Caribbean sounds in Spanish Reggae made the genre anti-establishment and a form of resistance to a country that denied Panamanians of Caribbean descent.

Describing himself as a “restless child,” El General would use different objects such as buckets, flutes, and anything in front of him to serve as an instrument. Musically influenced by Bob Marley and Burro Banton growing up, El General recounts in an interview his love for reggae. When he was younger, he was a part of a group called Renato and the Four Stars, which is when he got his nickname, “El General,” where they would sing reggae in Spanish.

He then received a scholarship, the young artist moved to the United States to study business administration, and became a professional accountant. While studying, he was also an MC for parties and opened up for dancehall and hip-hop musical acts. His connection to Black diasporic communities in New York both influenced his music and led to his music being spread across the Americas including the US, Panama, and Puerto Rico. This led to extreme popularity in the 90s with his first song “Tu Pum Pum,”

== Career and influence ==
His breakout performance came when he was featured on the song "Robi-Rob's Boriqua Anthem" from C+C Music Factory's album Anything Goes. During this time, he started working with Chino Rodriguez, an entrepreneur in the Latin music industry, who convinced Franco a.k.a. El General (as his close friends and family would call him), to perform a salsa song before his performance of "Robi-Rob's Boriqua Anthem". The performance was at the Madison Square Garden produced by Ralph Mercado (owner of RMM Records and who always produced large Latino events in New York). The fans were surprised that El General (Franco) sang a salsa song. Ralph Mercado gave El General more time in the tight schedule of stage allotment to do the salsa song before the scheduled performance of "Boriqua Anthem". Chino Rodriguez was able to convince Ralph Mercado to allow more time so that El General could surprise his fans.

He started his musical career when he was 19 years old, and for 17 years, his albums achieved gold status 32 times and platinum 17 times. Popular reggae in Spanish music in Panama was (and is still) called plena. Songs like "Muévelo" (1991), "Tu Pum Pum" (1991), "Rica y Apretadita" and "Te Ves Buena" are among his greatest hits. In 1992, El General received an MTV award for Best Latin Video with the great success of "Muévelo" produced by Pablo "Pabanor" Ortiz and Erick "More" Morillo. In 1993, El General won the Rap Artist of the Year Award at the Lo Nuestro Awards.

When asked in an interview about reggae and its true roots, El General responded with the history of the construction of the Panama Canal and migration of Jamaican folks into Panama. He shared that his musicality had been influenced by Burro Banton and Bob Marley, and how he had hoped to gain musical acceptance in Jamaica out of respect for reggae's native home: Jamaica. He also shared that reggae transitioned into a meaningful form of protest and a means of sharing information regarding everyday life, the news, or corruption in the government.

The Panama Canal connects Atlantic and Pacific trade routes and the descendants of the Black workers brought over “dancehall—an updated version of Jamaican reggae—into Panamanian sound system parties,” Panama, as a result, became a “multicultural melting pot” in which folks from Jamaica and Barbados were entering Panamanian spaces. Many reggaeton songs use dembow as their underlying basis for rhythm.

The relationship between labor of Black, low-income folks in Panama City and reggaeton music has been their usage of reggae music as a form of protest. Afro-Panamanian artist Renato expressed that it was through singing reggaeton that financially struggling Black folks could protest the government and police brutality. This could be seen in the music of El General's former band partner Renato, whose 1987 Spanish Reggae song “Lo que el D.E.N.I. puede hacer”, based on Lloyd Lovindeer's Jamaican hit "Babylon Boops", recounts a case of police brutality in response to a domestic violence incident.

In addition to reggae anti-policing history, themes regarding the commercialization of reggaeton, sexism, homophobia, and colorism emerged. In the podcast Loud hosted by Puerto Rican and reggaeton artist Ivy Queen, Ivy Queen shared her concerns regarding the role that commercialization of the genre plays in potentially silencing the rebellious fundamental themes in the music. The pushing away of Black roots can be detrimental to the very history that is reggaeton.

El General's success has been tremendous and influential to the genre of Reggaeton today. After gaining international notoriety in the early 1990s, his style of Spanish Reggae influenced “Underground” which would birth what is now considered Reggaetón in Puerto Rico, establishing the popularity of Spanish-language reggae rap in Latin America and the Caribbean. El General's success also serves as a way of understanding how important is the connection between Black communities in Panama, the Caribbean (Jaimaica, Barbados, etc.), and the Caribbean-American communities in New York.

== Retirement ==
In 2004, El General went on a farewell tour, announcing his retirement to focus on producing. However, after a few years, he seemed to have disappeared completely. A video that surfaced in 2008 features Franco explaining his return to the Jehovah's Witness faith and his leave from the music scene. Franco describes his time making music as a dark era. Franco is part of a wave of Latin artists (like Héctor el Father and Farruko) who have left Reggaeton for religious reasons. Gata, a cultural critic and Reggaeton artist, links the trend of these artists to notions of patriarchy and machismo and feeling guilty over sexual explicit lyrics.

== Discography ==
- Tu pum pum (1990)
- Te Ves Buena (1990)
- Muévelo Con el General (1991)
- "Son Bow" (1990)
- "No Más Guerra" (1991)
- El Poder del General (1992)
- Es Mundial (1994)
- Clubb 555 (1995)
- Rapa Pan Pan (1997)
- Move It Up (1998)
- Grandes Éxitos (1998)
- Colección Original (1998)
- Serie 2000 (2000)
- Back to the Original (2001)
- IS BACK (2001)
- General De Fiesta (2002)
- El General: The Hits (2003)
- To' Rap-Eao (2003)
- La Ficha Clave (2004)
