= El Roockie =

Panamanian musician

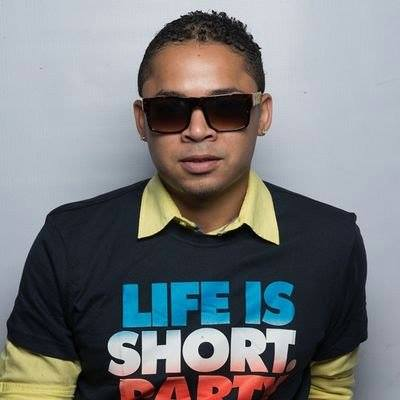
- ElRoockie

Background information
- Birth name: Iván Vladimir Banista Castillo
- Also known as: King of Lyrics, Maquina de Lirica
- Origin: Panama City, Panama
- Genres: Reggaeton, reggae en Español
- Years active: 1996–present
- Labels: Mas Flow Inc, Machete Music

Iván Vladimir Banista, better known as El Roockie or The Roockie (in English) is a Panamanian reggae recording artist, currently signed to Luny Tunes' Mas Flow Inc. He is widely praised for his powerful and delivering lyrics, earning him the nickname 'King of Lyrics' and 'Maquina de Lirica'.

== Career in Panama ==
Banista came from the humble origins of Chorrillo y San Miguel, Panama. He begins in the world of reggae 1996 recording for the CD "Reggae Overload" although previously recorded for the CD "Reggae Nonviolence" a CD somewhat unknown. Since its inception stuck with the much-remembered song "No More Violence" and then make themselves known with his romantic style with the song "Life is so" that the song was sung to duet with his friend, fellow rapper and producer, Elián Davis. Having impressed with the full "My bad side" of reggae disappear by mid-1998 because it was surrounded by controversy for ill rumors that had on him. After having disappeared for a moment as a reggae artist Panamanian returns but this time recording outside the station Fabulous 100.5 FM, which was where he began to write on the CD "The Mafia" has been the only time where "The Buayla Roockie" engraved on productions outside Fabulous 100.5 FM. For the month of November 1999 goes on sale its first production entitled "Revelation Lyrics" a compilation of most of their songs until then and also new topics that of course the CD was a huge success in sales. He would quickly achieve incredible success in his country with its in equable lyrics that "raise hairs." His appearances on several compilation albums such as Overload 1, La Pesadilla, Da’ Crew, Etc. would make him one of the most recognizable, marketable and beloved figures of national talent. Banista's music would earn him significant fanbase in Central America, South America and certain underground circles in the United States and Spain. His fame would only be compared to countrymen of the Reggae in Spanish genre Nando Boom and El General. His music would lead to a grammy nomination in 2003 for album of the year in the category of Best Rap/Hip-hop. As well to his lyrical recognition, Banista's music is often seen as barrier breaking. Ranging from the cruel poetic reality of the streets, to engaging love songs, and even profound Christian topics. Even collaborating with national artist, such as Kafu Banton, as well as international artist such as Anthony B.

== Signing with Mas Flow Inc. ==
In March 2006, Banista signed with Machete Music. His following album, titled Semblante Urbano was produced by Luny Tunes of Mas Flow Inc. Luny of the production duo said in a recent interview that Banista "...he has lyrics that can cut veins." DJ Nelson had always had interest in bringing Banista over to the Puerto Rican scene. And it has been until recently an inevitable deal was struck. The album is expected to be released September 25. The first single "Parece Sincera" was released to radio stations August 14 to radio stations in Latin America and Spain.

== Discography ==
- 1999: Revelation Lyrics
- 2001: Maquina de Lirica (Disco Doble)
- 2002: Formula Cruda
- 2003: En Tus Manos
- 2005: Humanidad
- 2008: Semblante Urbano
- 2010: The Roockie Is Back

== See also ==
- Music of Panama
- Reggaeton
- Luny Tunes
- Mas Flow Inc
- Urban
