= Los Pikadientes de Caborca =

Mexican musical group

- Origin: Caborca, Sonora, Mexico
- Genres: Cumbia, Norteño, Latin pop
- Years active: 2008–present
- Labels: Sony BMG, Remolino Publishing
- Members: Francisco González; Javier González; Bernabe Leonardo; Nicolas Costich; Neyoy Job
- Past members: Chamolo
- Website: http://lospikadientes.com/

Los Pikadientes de Caborca are a Mexican musical group whose debut single, "La Cumbia del Río", charted on the Billboard Hot Latin Tracks in 2008.

Los Pikadientes de Caborca began as a YouTube sensation, with many users posting viral videos of themselves dancing to the hit. Sony BMG signed the group in 2008 and released their full-length album, Vámonos Pa'l Río. The album peaked at #52 on the Billboard 200. The band received a Grammy nomination for Best Regional Mexican Album at the 2009 Grammy Awards. and their live debut was in front of 200,000 people in Whittier Narrows Park.

Francisco González won the Composer of the Year award from Monitor Latino in 2014. Other nominations include the Billboard Awards, Lo Nuestro Awards and the Grammys.

Francisco González continued to write songs for other artists. In 2019, he reunited the band, and in 2020, he participated in Fashion Week in New York and debuted on the catwalk with Alonso Máximo's designer. The band are currently finishing the recording of their next album, which is expected to be released in late May 2020.

Francisco González is the lead vocalist of the band, Sonoran, red-bone musician, composer and founder of Los Pikadientes. He has composed songs for some groups such as Calibre 50, Banda Los Recoditos, La # 1 Banda Jerez De Marcos Flores, Julion Alvarez, Saul El Jaguar, Chuy Lizarraga and La Original Banda Limón.

== Discography ==
=== Albums ===
- 2008: Vámonos Pa'l Río
- 2009: La Tenía Más Grande
- 2010: Mas Desmadrosos Que Nunca

=== Singles ===
- 2008: "La Cumbia del Río"

== Awards ==
2009

- Grammy Awards
  - Best Regional Mexican Album [Nominated]
- Lo Nuestro Awards
  - Breakout Artist or Group of the Year [Nominated]

== Members ==
- January 2008: Gonzalez Terrazas Francisco Rafael (singer)
- January 2011: Gonzalez Gastelum Javier Alberto (saxophone)
- April 2018: Neyoy Ruiz Job Esteban (drummer)
- May 2018: Bernabe Roman Leonardo (tuba)
- January 2019: Nicolas Costich Costich (guitar)
