= Te Quiero (Flex song) =

2007 single by Flex

Single by Flex

from the album Te Quiero: Romantic Style in da World
- Released: September 28, 2007
- Genre: Reggaeton
- Length: 3:17
- Label: EMI Latin
- Songwriter: Félix Danilo Gómez
- Producers: Elian Davis; Predikador

Flex singles chronology
"Te Quiero" (2007)	"Escápate" (2007)

"Te Quiero" (English: "I Love You") is the debut single by Panamanian singer Flex from his debut studio album Te Quiero: Romantic Style in da World released on September 28, 2007. In 2008, the number serves as main-theme of Mexican telenovela Central de Abastos. It won the Billboard Latin Music Award for Latin Rhythm Airplay Song of the Year in 2009.

== Music video ==
A music video for the song was directed by Conrado Martínez. It was filmed in Mexico City on September 7 and released on September 10, 2007.

== Chart performance ==
The song topped the Billboard Hot Latin Tracks, Latin Tropical Airplay and Latin Rhythm Airplay charts in the United States and charts in Mexico. It also charted on the Billboard Hot 100 at number 86, becoming Flex's most successful single to date. "Te Quiero" ranked fourth at the Hot Latin Songs twenty-fifth anniversary chart.

=== Charts ===
==== Weekly charts ====
Chart (2007–2008)	Peak position
Argentina (CAPIF)	10
Dominican Republic Airplay (Top Latino)	1
Mexico (Monitor Latino)	1
US Billboard Hot 100	86
US Hot Latin Songs (Billboard)	1
US Latin Pop Airplay (Billboard)	3
US Latin Rhythm Airplay (Billboard)	1
US Regional Mexican Airplay (Billboard)	1
US Tropical Airplay (Billboard)	7

==== All-time charts ====
Chart (2021)	Position
US Hot Latin Songs (Billboard)	6

== Certifications ==
Region	Certification	Certified units/sales
Mexico (AMPROFON)	2× Platinum	120,000^{*}
Mexico (AMPROFON) Ringtone	Diamond+Gold	260,000^{*}
^{*} Sales figures based on certification alone.

== Remix ==
"Te Quiero (Spanglish Version)"

Single by Flex and Belinda

from the album Te Quiero: Romantic Style in da World and La Evolución Romantic Style
- Released: March 13, 2008
- Recorded: 2008
- Genre: Reggaeton
- Length: 3:23
- Label: EMI Latin
- Songwriter: Félix Danilo Gómez
- Producers: Elian Davis; Predikador

Flex singles chronology
"Por Ti Baby" (2008)	"Te Quiero (Spanglish Version)" (2008)	"Dime Si Te Vas Con Él" (2009)

Belinda singles chronology
"See A Little Light" (2008)	""Te Quiero (Remix)"" (2008)	"Sal de Mi Piel" (2009)

An acoustic and Spanglish version with singer Belinda were recorded for the fan edition of Te Quiero: Romantic Style in da World. It was released as the fourth and final single from the album on May 13, 2009. A music video features Belinda was also released as part of promotion of the single. The song was well received on radio stations from Mexico.

== Other remixes ==
A remix with singer Arcángel and another with Thiaguinho were recorded but not included on any edition of the album.

== Track listing ==
Maxi single

1. "Te Quiero" – 3:16
2. "Te Quiero" (Spanglish Version) (featuring Belinda) – 3:23
3. "Te Quiero" (Acoustic Version) (featuring Belinda) – 2:48

== See also ==
- List of number-one singles of 2007 (Spain)
- List of number-one songs of 2007 (Mexico)
- List of number-one Billboard Hot Latin Songs of 2008
- List of Billboard Latin Rhythm Airplay number ones of 2008
