= Predikador =

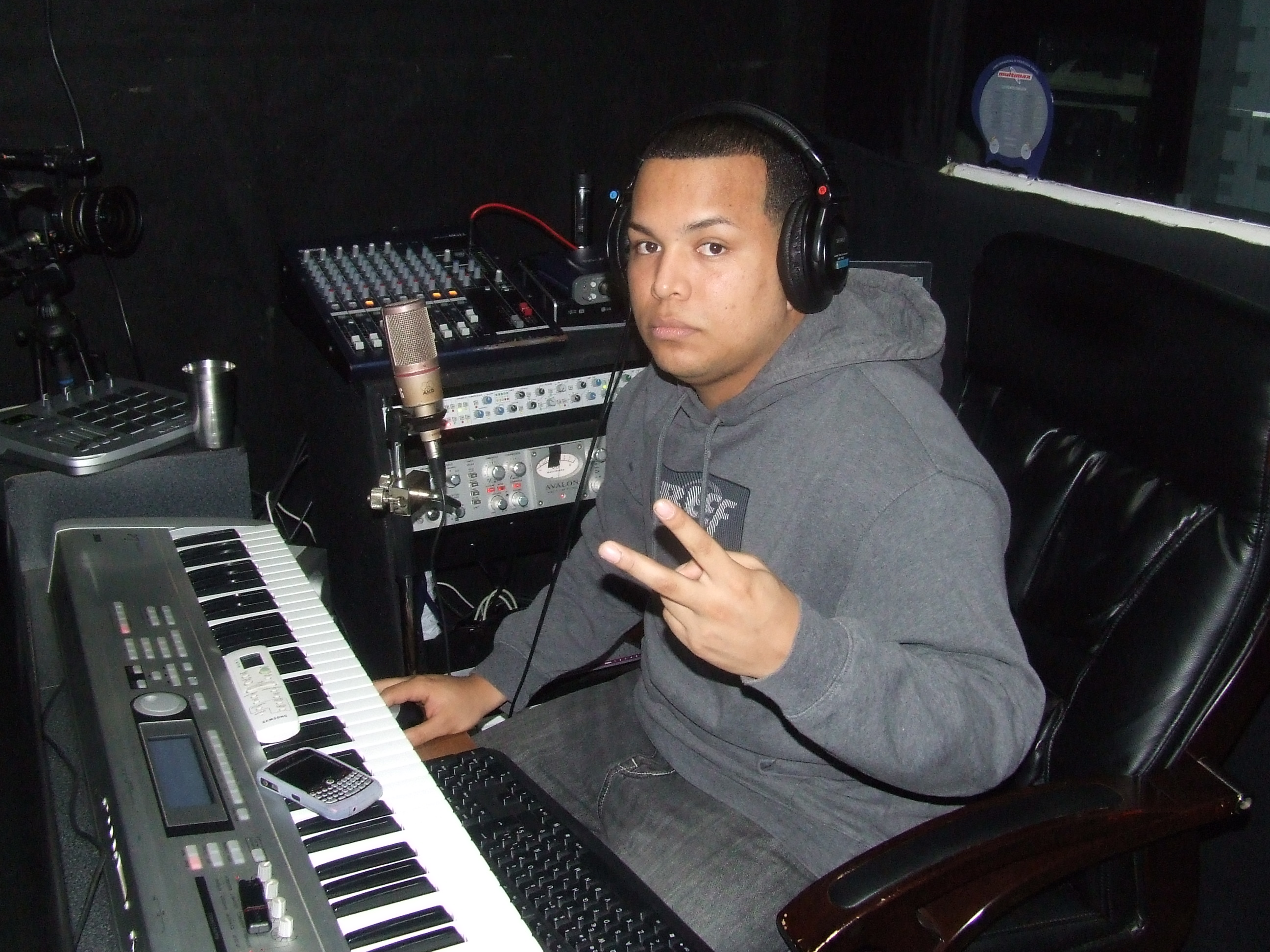
- Predikador on his studio in Panama

Background information
- Born: Victor Delgado; December 27, 1983 (age 42); Arraiján, Panama
- Genres: Reggae en Español, reggaeton
- Occupation: music producer
- Years active: 1999–present
- Website: predikador.com

Predikador (born Víctor Delgado December 27, 1983) is a Panamanian reggaeton producer He is signed to Mas Flow Inc.

== Life ==
He was born in from Arraiján, Panama.

== Musical career ==
Eddie Dee was the first Puerto Rican artist in believing the talent and musical capacity of Predikador, both started working together by the end of 2006, and they collaborated in the mixtape The Final Countdown in which Predikador produced the hit song "Mensaje de Texto" which had a great acceptance from the audience.

Predikador worked on Mi Flow: This Is It the debut studio album from Baby Ranks. In March of that year Predikador signs with Mas Flow Inc. after negotiations with famous producer Luny who had an interest of the talent of this producer and Luny rapidly invited him to produce the new CD of Daddy Yankee Talento de Barrio in which Predi participated arranging 2 tracks of this singer, one of them "Llamado de Emergencia" which is already getting a lot of airplay on the radio. He has also written a song from Pee Wee album Yo Soy called Tan Feliz.

Predikador also participated on Semblante Urbano of El Roockie where he produced various tracks, and also produced the first single from the album "Parece Sincera" in which he collaborated with Luny Tunes. He also produced the hit song Martes de Galería in which he worked with talented artist De La Ghetto. He also worked on the album from Erre XI.

He also produced Perdoname from La Factoría and also was a key piece of the album by Flex producing his hit single Te Quiero.

Currently he's working with Luny on various projects including the next installment of Mas Flow (tentatively titled Mas Flow 3) which is set to be released in 2014. He has also produced tracks from Flex next album and is also working on his new company Evolution Records in partnership worth Joey Montana. He has produced 6 tracks from Eddie Dee's oft-delayed album "El Diario De Eddie Avila".

He produced many tracks for Joey Montana's Album "Flow Con Clase."

He has been described as Panama's number one reggaeton producer.
