= Flex (singer) =

Panamanian singer (born 1980)

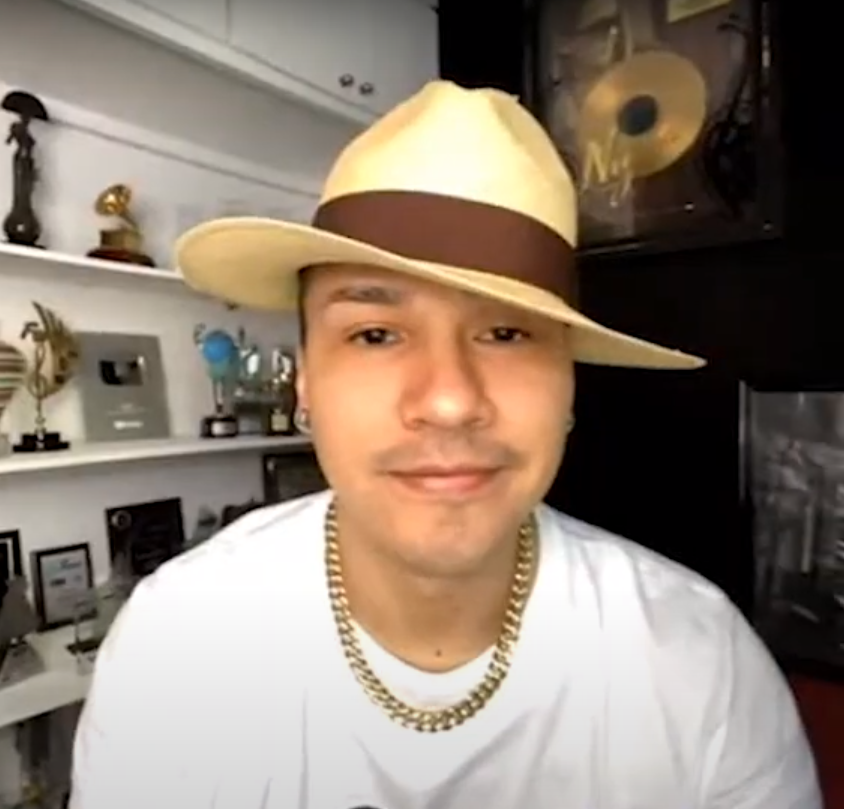
- Flex in 2020

Background information
- Also known as: Nigga (Note: He does not go by this stage name anymore, and prefers to be called Flex.)
- Born: Félix Danilo Gómez Bosquez; 29 August 1980 (age 46); Panama City, Panama
- Origin: Chitré, Panama
- Genres: Hip-hop; reggae; Latin pop
- Occupation: Singer
- Instrument: Vocals
- Years active: 1997–present
- Labels: EMI Televisa; Sony Latin

Félix Danilo Gómez Bosquez (born 29 August 1980), known by his stage name Flex (formerly Nigga), is a Panamanian reggaeton singer. He originally adopted the name Nigga after being told by another Panamanian artist that he "sings like a black guy from Jamaica." Before releasing his debut album in the United States in 2010, Flex removed references to his nickname in songs, and his albums were reissued with the new name, "Flex" and he permanently adopted the moniker in 2016.

== Musical career ==
=== Early years ===
He began his musical career in 1997 with a song entitled "Como puedo cantar" in a duet with Toby King, which belonged to Pucho Bustamente's Da Crew album. But it was not until the year 2000 when he became known, appearing together with other artists on the album: Las Propias 2000 of the radio station Fabulosa Stereo and the producer Celia Torres. Being at that time where he recorded the song "Déjala" with Duende which managed to be placed in the rankings of countries such as: United States, Guatemala, Nicaragua, Venezuela and Peru. Then, without having finished the recording of that album, the producer asked him to record a song on the occasion of Mothers Day in Panama called "La balada de Nigga", although after the recording it was learned that his mother had died due to an expired medication in dialysis treatment. On that album a ballad version was recorded and then a reggae version on the album Deat Match where he would also record "Si tu me maras". Later he recorded the song with the singer Catherine "El Mono Oscuro". Later he released an album with the title of Triple N that managed to break sales records in Mexico City. From this album comes the single "Si no te Tengo" also known as "En este mundo" that was playing on Ecuadorian radio for approximately 8 months.

In 2003 he performed more than 40 concerts in Mexico and shared the stage with Tranzas, Ecualizate, Los Subversivos, among others. In that same year he was in a musical group called Rocky Yes that was made up of Panamanian singers: El Friend, Duende and El Aspirante, with which he managed to record 25 songs including "Amigo", "Tienes que olvidarla", "Déjala" and "Vivir sin ti."

=== Consecration ===
In 2007 he released his first solo album called Te Quiero: Romantic Style in da World which received a review of two and a half stars out of a total of five by the Allmusic web portal. The album was certified double platinum by AMPROFON in Mexico. The first single from this record material called "Te Quiero" reached #1 on Hot Latin Songs and #86 on Billboard Hot 100, both Billboard charts. With all this achieved, the Panamanian performed duets with Juan Luis Guerra, Daddy Yankee, Wisin & Yandel, Sean Kingston and Rihanna.

On 13 November 2008, he won his first Latin Grammy with the song "Te Quiero" in the category of Best Urban Song. In addition to this, he managed to win the prize in the National America category of the 40 Principal Awards of Spain as Best Artist of Panama. He also participated in the television program El Show de los Sueños of Televisa in its second season, where he won second place, however he was eliminated in the next stage which was called Los Reyes del Show. In that same year he had a brief foray into acting by having a special participation in the television series Central de abastos and the song "Te Quiero" served as the soundtrack.

In 2009 he released his second album entitled La Evolución Romantic Style with the promotion of the singles "Dime si te vas con él", "Te Dejaré" and "Te amo tanto" that had a special edition. The album charted at #1 on Latin Rhythm Albums and #3 on Top Latin Albums. During that year he won 8 of 13 nominations at the Billboard Music Awards, surpassing great artists such as Enrique Iglesias, Maná and Luis Fonsi.

=== Decadence and discographic blockade ===
In 2010 he released the third album of the Romantic Style series called Romantic Style Parte 3: Desde La Esencia which debuted at #25 on the Top Latin Albums, becoming his lowest debut on the US charts.

In 2012 he released his fourth studio album called "Vives en mi" through Emi Latin. This album was not as successful as his previous albums, as it was blocked by Sony Music, which had been the subsidiary of EMI Televisa Music and was the previous Flex discography. In addition, this was his last album distributed in Mexico, due to its record block. Shortly after being blocked by said discography, he returned to Panama with the aim of enhancing his musical career. In that year he collaborated with the Puerto Rican duo Alexis & Fido on the single "Contéstame el teléfono" which was nominated for the Lo Nuestro Awards in the category of Best Urban Song, although it would not ultimately win.

=== Later years ===
In 2013, he was the winner of the talent show Tu cara me suena in his first season in Panama. Since then, he continued to collaborate with other singers, among his, the most relevant was "No te pedí de más" with Makano.

In 2015 he released his sixth studio album called Seduction under the distribution of Sony Music. The album was moderately successful as it peaked at #2 on Billboard's Latin Rhythm Albums chart for two consecutive weeks. From that album came the single "Nadie como tú", which was ranked #20 on the Latin Pop Airplay. In that year he made a relevant collaboration on the single "Disfruta la vida" with the Spanish singer Antonio Barullo and the Puerto Rican rapper J Álvarez, which earned him another nomination for the 2017 Lo Nuestro Award in the category of Collaboration of the Year - Urban, but again without winning.

In 2018, he made his musical return to Mexico after being blocked by his old discography, premiering the single "Cerquita de mi" with Mexican singer Ricky Rick.

In 2019 he resumed his musical career as an independent artist with the single "Me enamore de ti". In the years to come, he released several singles, which did not achieve the same success as when he was at the height of his musical career. However, on May 14, 2021, he released his sixth studio album on all digital platforms called Delirio with a total of 12 songs and without any collaboration.

== Disputes ==
The artistic name that Félix initially adopted sparked controversy and was harshly criticized in the United States, as "Nigga" can be used pejoratively and derogatorily in English. At the end of 2007, at the advice of his manager and to end the controversy, he changed his name from "Nigga" to "Flex". The parts where he mentioned his old name were edited and reprinted on his CD packaging in the North American country.

On 10 March 2021, there was an altercation with the Puerto Rican rapper Darell, who released a video on his social networks asking the Panamanian producer El Chombo to revive Flex, who was well dead in the music scene. That testimony caused inconvenience in the fans of Flex and the entire public of Panama, who responded to Darell and even wrote to him on his personal Instagram account that he could not speak ill of a singer who had won eight Billboard awards of the Latin music and a Latin Grammy, nor should he speak ill of the Romantic Stye or the music of Panama and that he was only known in Panama for his participation in the single "Otro trago" by Sech, precisely who is also Panamanian.

== Awards and accomplishments ==
Flex has received nominations for a variety of awards shows including Premios Billboard, Premios lo Nuestro, Latin Grammys, Premios Juventud, Premios Oye, and Premios Monitor Latino. Flex has won an Oye award, a Latin Grammy, and eight Billboard Latin Music awards.

His accomplishments include a number one position in Mexican and American radio for over 20 weeks, as well as Gold and Platinum album sales worldwide.

== Personal life ==
After five years of dating, Flex married his long-time girlfriend Osiris Vega on 26 August 2008, and got divorced in 2011. Flex lives in the United States.

== Discography ==
Studio albums

- 2007: Te Quiero: Romantic Style in da World
- 2009: La Evolución Romantic Style
- 2010: Romantic Style Parte 3: Desde La Esencia
- 2012: Vives En Mí
- 2015: Seduction

EPs

- 2009: AOL Dejando Huellas

Compilation albums

- 2011: A Todo Romantic Style

== Accolades ==
=== Billboard Latin Music Awards ===
Year	Nominee / work	Award	Result
2009	"Te Quiero"	Hot Latin Song of the Year	Nominated
2009	"Te Quiero"	Hot Latin Song of the Year, Male	Won
2009	"Te Quiero"	Hot Latin Song of the Year, New	Won
2009	"Te Quiero"	Latin Pop Airplay Song of the Year	Nominated
2009	"Te Quiero"	Tropical Airplay Song of the Year, Male	Won
2009	"Te Quiero"	Latin Rhythm Airplay Song of the Year, Solo	Won
2009	"Te Quiero"	Latin Ringmaster of the Year	Won
2009	Himself	Hot Latin Song Artist of the Year, Male	Nominated
2009	Himself	Top Latin Albums Artist of the Year	Nominated
2009	Te Quiero: Romantic Style In Da World	Latin Album of the Year	Nominated
2009	Te Quiero: Romantic Style In Da World	Top Latin Album of the Year, Male	Nominated
2009	Te Quiero: Romantic Style In Da World	Top Latin Album of the Year, New	Won
2009	Te Quiero: Romantic Style In Da World	Latin Rhythm Album of the Year, Solo	Won

=== Latin Grammy Awards ===
Year	Nominee / work	Award	Result
2008	Te Quiero: Romantic Style In Da World	Best Urban Music Album	Nominated
2008	"Te Quiero"	Best Urban Song	Won

=== Lo Nuestro Awards ===
Year	Nominee / work	Award	Result
2009	Te Quiero: Romantic Style In Da World	Urban Album of the Year	Nominated
2009	Himself	Urban Artist of the Year	Nominated
2009	"Te Quiero"	Urban Song of the Year	Won
2010	La Evolución Romantic Style	Urban Album of the Year	Nominated
2010	Himself	Urban Artist of the Year	Nominated
2010	"Dime Si Te Vas Con Él"	Urban Song of the Year	Nominated
2017	"Disfruta La Vida"; Joint nomination with Antonio Barullo and J Álvarez	Urban Collaboration of the Year	Nominated
