= 100% Tierra Caliente =

Studio album by Beto y sus Canarios
- Released: January 27, 2004
- Genres: Tierra Caliente, Norteño-sax, banda
- Length: 47:39
- Label: Disa

Beto y sus Canarios chronology
Mi Despedida (2002)	100% Tierra Caliente (2004)	Ardientes (2005)

Singles from 100% Tierra Caliente
- 1. "Está Llorando Mi Corazón" Released: 2004

100% Tierra Caliente (transl. 100% Hot Land ) is a studio album by regional Mexican band, Beto y sus Canarios, released on January 27, 2004. This album includes the hit single "Está Llorando Mi Corazón," which won the award for Regional Mexican Airplay of the Year by a Male Group at the 2005 Latin Billboard Music Awards.

It comprises fifteen tracks with different rhythms, such as rancheras, cumbias, and ballads. The album sold nearly 200,000 copies.

== Track listing ==
The information from AllMusic.

No.	Title	Writer(s)	Length
1.	"La Marianita"	Martín Ruvalcaba	2:55
2.	"Herido de Amor (Te Quiero, Te Quiero)"	Leonardo Puebla Benítez	3:06
3.	"Está Llorando Mi Corazón"	Cuauhtémoc González García	2:56
4.	"El Sufrimiento"	Martín Ruvalcaba	3:39
5.	"El Reventon de la Yoyis"	Gabino García Palacios	3:36
6.	"Tus Desprecios"	Orlando Garcia Cantu	3:44
7.	"Perdóname"	D.A.R.	3:45
8.	"La Marianita (Banda)"	Martín Ruvalcaba	3:03
9.	"A Usted"	Liliana Barrera	2:56
10.	"Eres Bonita"	Santana Roja	2:43
11.	"Un Clavo Saca Otro Clavo"	Leonardo Puebla Benítez	3:05
12.	"Que Bonita Te Ves"	Jose Lorenzo "El Conejito" Morales	3:17
13.	"Mi Casita"	Luis Kalaff	2:48
14.	"Rosita"	Francisco Calderon/Jeff Dahl	3:14
15.	"De Cama en Cama"	Daniel Núñez	2:52

== Chart performance ==
Chart (2005)	Peak position
Billboard Top Latin Albums	21
