= List of number-one Billboard Regional Mexican Songs of 2004 =

The Billboard Regional Mexican Songs chart ranks the best-performing Regional Mexican singles in the United States. Published weekly by Billboard magazine, it ranks the "most popular regional Mexican songs, ranked by radio airplay audience impressions as measured by Nielsen Music."

== Chart history ==
Key
†	Indicates number 1 on Billboard's year-end regional Mexican chart

Issue date	Song	Artist(s)	Ref.
January 3	"Nomás por tu culpa"	Los Huracanes del Norte	
January 10	"Nomás por tu culpa"	Los Huracanes del Norte	
January 17	"Nomás por tu culpa"	Los Huracanes del Norte	
January 24	"Nomás por tu culpa"	Los Huracanes del Norte	
January 31	"Lágrimas de cristal"	Grupo Montez de Durango	
February 7	"Lágrimas de cristal"	Grupo Montez de Durango	
February 14	"Lágrimas de cristal"	Grupo Montez de Durango	
February 21	"Lágrimas de cristal"	Grupo Montez de Durango	
February 28	"Lágrimas de cristal"	Grupo Montez de Durango	
March 6	"Hazme olvidarla"	Conjunto Primavera	
March 13	"Hazme olvidarla"	Conjunto Primavera	
March 20	"Hazme olvidarla"	Conjunto Primavera	
March 27	"Baraja de oro"	Palomo	
April 3	"¿Cómo pude enamorarme de ti?"	Patrulla 81	
April 10	"Hazme olvidarla"	Conjunto Primavera	
April 17	"Baraja de oro"	Palomo	
April 24	"Baraja de oro"	Palomo	
May 1	"Baraja de oro"	Palomo	
May 8	"Baraja de oro"	Palomo	
May 15	"Baraja de oro"	Palomo	
May 22	"¿A dónde estabas?"	Intocable	
May 29	"¿A dónde estabas?"	Intocable	
June 5	"Dos locos" †	Los Horóscopos de Durango	
June 12	"Dos locos" †	Los Horóscopos de Durango	
June 19	"Dos locos" †	Los Horóscopos de Durango	
June 26	"Dos locos" †	Los Horóscopos de Durango	
July 3	"Dos locos" †	Los Horóscopos de Durango	
July 10	"Dos locos" †	Los Horóscopos de Durango	
July 17	"¿Qué de raro tiene?"	Los Temerarios	
July 24	"¿Qué de raro tiene?"	Los Temerarios	
July 31	"¿Qué de raro tiene?"	Los Temerarios	
August 7	"¿Qué de raro tiene?"	Los Temerarios	
August 14	"Soy tu mujer"	Alicia Villarreal	
August 21	"Dos locos" †	Los Horóscopos de Durango	
August 28	"Dos locos" †	Los Horóscopos de Durango	
September 4	"Ojalá que te mueras"	Pesado	
September 11	"Ojalá que te mueras"	Pesado	
September 18	"Ojalá que te mueras"	Pesado	
September 25	"Ojalá que te mueras"	Pesado	
October 2	"Ojalá que te mueras"	Pesado	
October 9	"Ojalá que te mueras"	Pesado	
October 16	"Está llorando mi corazón"	Beto y sus Canarios	
October 23	"Está llorando mi corazón"	Beto y sus Canarios	
October 30	"Está llorando mi corazón"	Beto y sus Canarios	
November 6	"Está llorando mi corazón"	Beto y sus Canarios	
November 13	"Está llorando mi corazón"	Beto y sus Canarios	
November 20	"Está llorando mi corazón"	Beto y sus Canarios	
November 27	"Está llorando mi corazón"	Beto y sus Canarios	
December 4	"Está llorando mi corazón"	Beto y sus Canarios	
December 11	"Está llorando mi corazón"	Beto y sus Canarios	
December 18	"Está llorando mi corazón"	Beto y sus Canarios	
December 25	"Está llorando mi corazón"	Beto y sus Canarios	
