= Contigo por Siempre =

Studio album by Beto y sus Canarios
- Released: November 6, 2007
- Genres: Tierra Caliente, Norteño-sax
- Length: 34:37
- Label: Disa

Beto y sus Canarios chronology
Ardientes (2005)	Contigo por Siempre (2007)	Gracias (2008)

Contigo por Siempre (transl. With You Forever) is a studio album by regional Mexican band Beto y sus Canarios, released on November 7, 2006.

The album ventures into rancheras, ballads, cumbias, and charangas.

== Track listing ==
Track listing from Allmusic:

No.	Title	Writer(s)	Length
1.	"Se Terminó el Amor"	Cuauhtémoc González García	3:05
2.	"Muchacha Bonita"	Andrique García Morales	2:19
3.	"Bailando"	Cuauhtémoc González García/Andrique García Morales	2:36
4.	"No Puedo Estar Sin Ti"	Cuauhtémoc González García	2:32
5.	"Esta Noche"	Artemio García Palacios	2:34
6.	"Un Osito dormilón"	Jean Carlos Centeno	5:36
7.	"No Quiero Estar Sin Verte"	Cuauhtémoc González García	2:39
8.	"Deseperado"	Artemio García Palacios	2:47
9.	"Colombia Rock"	Clemente Contreras	2:49
10.	"Mis Dos Amantes"	Daniel Núñez	2:17
11.	"Recuérdame un poquito"	Gabino García Palacios	2:40
12.	"Amigos nada más"	Joan Sebastian	2:21

== Chart performance ==
Chart (2006)	Peak position
US Regional Mexican Albums (Billboard)	6
US Top Latin Albums (Billboard)	16
