= Gerardo Díaz y su Gerarquía =

Tierra Caliente group formed in La Calera, Guerrero, México

- Also known as: El Cerebro de Oro
- Origin: La Calera, Guerrero, Mexico
- Years active: 2018-present
- Label: AfinArte Music
- Members: Gerardo Díaz Borja (Vocals and musical director) (2018–present); Yovanny Martínez (Vocals) (2018–present); Fernando Vargas (Animator) (2018-present); Pablo Muñoz (Vocals) (2023–present); Noel Eguiluz (Bajo quinto) (2019–present); Paulo González (Bass guitar) (2021–present); Jhonny Duarte (Accordion) (2023–present); Jaime Nava (Keyboard) (2023-present); Enrique Ochoa (Drums) (2018-present); Jaime González Lagunas (trombone and trumpet) (2021-present); Osvaldo Benítez (trombone and trumpet) (2023-present); Rausell Téllez Mariano (trombone and trumpet) (2024-present)
- Past members: Enrique Gordiano Martínez (Bajo quinto) (2018–2020) Jesús Peña Alvarado † (trombone and trumpet) (2018-2021); Hernán García (Bajo quinto) (2020–2021); Ángel Solís "El Sipi" (Keyboard) (2018-2022); Oliveiro Rangel Pineda (Accordion) (2018-2023); Víctor Manuel Sánchez (trombone and trumpet) (2018-2023) Rubén García Aguirre (trombone and trumpet) (2018-2023)

Gerardo Díaz y su Gerarquía is a regional Mexican band from La Calera, municipality of Zirándaro, Guerrero, Mexico, that was founded in 2018. It was formed by Gerardo Díaz.

The band continues in its work of bringing the music of Tierra Caliente to Mexico, the United States and Central America. Alongside colleagues such as La Dinastía de Tuzantla and Beto y sus Canarios, they are musical acts in exploiting Tierra Caliente music.

Mi Última Caravana, El Mejor Lugar and El Albañil are some of the band's hits, composed by Gerardo Díaz, nicknamed El Cerebro de Oro, with millions of streams.

== Discography ==
=== Albums ===
- 2018: Pa' los Mal Agradecidos
- 2018: Composiciones y No Imitaciones
- 2019: Amistad y Pesos
- 2021: Yo Soy de la Sierra
- 2022: Corridos Necesarios, Vol. 1
- 2024: El Cocho de Tierra Caliente
- 2024: Homenaje a un Poeta

=== Extended play ===
- 2019: 5 Covers

=== Singles ===
- 2018: Pa´ Los Mal Agradecidos
- 2018: El Serio
- 2019: El Jaque Mate
- 2019: Zirándaro (ft La Leyenda De Servando Montalva y Banda Costeños)
- 2019: Besos y Cerezas
- 2019: No Quise Decirle
- 2019: Cadena Perpetua (ft Los Dos De Tamaulipas)
- 2019: Un Día de Rey y Otro de Wey (ft Jr Salazar)
- 2019: Mi Pueblito
- 2020: El Albañil
- 2020: El Mejor Lugar
- 2020: Lo Que Ella Necesita (ft Cuitla Vega)
- 2020: Monedas y Billetes (ft Los Players de Tuzantla)
- 2020: Las Envidias, los Chismes y las Traiciones
- 2021: La Vaca de Colima
- 2021: El Valiente (ft Kanales)
- 2021: La Carga Fina (ft Beto y sus Canarios)
- 2021: Borracho y Mujeriego
- 2021: La Tuya, la Mía y la Que Es
- 2021: El Malo Hoy Seré
- 2021: El LV (ft Los Dos De Tamaulipas)
- 2021: El Oro Verde (ft Alemi Bustos)
- 2022: El Agradecido (ft Los Dos De Tamaulipas)
- 2022: El Compa Zero (ft Los Dos De Tamaulipas)
- 2022: Soy Socializador (ft Luis Alfonso "El Yaki")
- 2022: El Sucesor (ft Voz de Mando)
- 2022: Se Me Acabó El Dinero (ft Traviezoz de la Sierra)
- 2022: La Mosquita Muerta
- 2022: San Judas Tadeo
- 2022: Y Cómo Creen (ft Traviezoz de la Sierra)
- 2022: Ni El Primero Ni El Último
- 2023: Recordando A Mi Pueblo
- 2023: Juntos Los Dos
- 2023: El Regreso De Chico (ft El Fantasma)
- 2023: Serious (ft Nicolas Garcia)
- 2023: El Chapín
- 2023: Chema Arroyo (ft Voz de Mando)
- 2023: Dile
- 2023: Arturo El Rey (ft Hijos De Barron)
- 2023: Franco Tavarez (ft Jesús Ojeda y Sus Parientes)
- 2023: El Ahuate (ft Los Farmerz - En Vivo)
- 2023: Sacandole Cuentas (ft Los Farmerz)
- 2023: Dólares de a 100 y Billetes de a 1000 (ft Enigma Norteño)
- 2023: Soy Como Quiero Ser (Homenaje a Joan Sebastian)
- 2024: El H20 o el Ahuate
- 2024: El Gallo Negro (ft Los Flamerz)
- 2024: Yo Fui Fidel - En Vivo

== Awards ==
Year	Award	Category	Nominated work	Result	Ref.
2020	Premios TVyNovelas (Favoritos del Público)				
2020	Premios TVyNovelas (Favoritos del Público)	Musical Release of the Year	Gerardo Díaz y su Gerarquía	Won	
