= Ardientes =

Studio album by Beto y sus Canarios
- Released: July 19, 2005
- Genres: Tierra Caliente, Norteño-sax
- Length: 47:39
- Label: Disa

Beto y sus Canarios chronology
100% Tierra Caliente (2004)	Ardientes (2005)	Contigo por Siempre (2006)

Singles from Ardientes
- 1. "No Puedo Olvidarte" Released: 2005

Ardientes (transl. Ardent) is a studio album by regional Mexican band Beto y sus Canarios, released on July 19, 2005. This album includes the hit singles, "No Puedo Olvidarte" written by Cuauhtémoc González García and "Pensando en Ti" written by both Cuauhtémoc González García and Artemio García Palacios, then members of the group.

== Track listing ==
The information from AllMusic.

No.	Title	Writer(s)	Length
1.	"No Puedo Olvidarte"	Cuauhtémoc González García	2:45
2.	"Nunca Te Olvidaré"	Clemente Galisteo	2:40
3.	"Linda Morenita"	Saúl García Cortéz	2:04
4.	"Beso Tras Beso"	Jesus Alberto Villero	3:11
5.	"Más Dulce Que Tú"	Leo Dan	2:23
6.	"Pensando en Ti"	Artemio García Palacios/Cuauhtémoc González García
7.	"Jacinto y El Sancho"	Martin Rubalcaba	2:15
8.	"Amor Imposible"	Rosario Antonio Ventura	2:20
9.	"Atole de Elote"	Jose Aguinada	2:38
10.	"Esta Soledad"	Artemio Garcia Palacios	2:51
11.	"Donde Estés y Con Quien Estés"	Camilo Blanes	3:00
12.	"Por Si No Te Vuelvo a Ver"	Martín Ruvalcaba	2:53

== Chart performance ==
Chart (2005)	Peak position
US Top Latin Albums (Billboard)	2

== Sales and certifications ==
Region	Certification	Certified units/sales
United States (RIAA)	Platinum (Latin)	100,000^{^}
^{^} Shipments figures based on certification alone.
