= Regional styles of Mexican music =

Different musical styles found in the states of Mexico

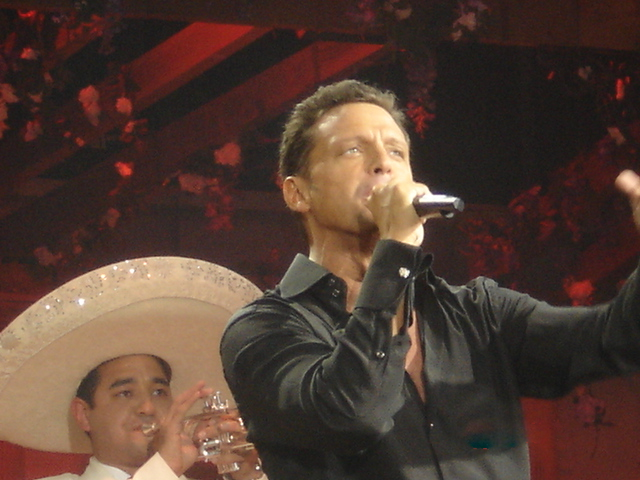
Luis Miguel in concert live with Mariachi

Regional styles of Mexican music vary greatly from state to state. Norteño, banda, duranguense, Son mexicano and other Mexican country music genres are often known as regional Mexican music because each state produces different musical sounds and lyrics.

== Baja California ==
Baja California has a characteristic style derived from the huapango norteño, known as calabaceado. Calabaceado is a type of dance that was created in the 1940s, based in the fact that "norteño music" and typical cowboy cultures were being mixed, which is reflected in the dance. Other norteño forms are also popular, such as Vals Norteño, Chotis, Mazurka and mariachi.

== Chiapas ==
Chiapas has produced many marimba bands and artists, such as Marimbas de Chiapas. Chiapas has its own "son" tradition (son chiapaneco), often played on the marimba. Mexican waltzes are also particularly popular here.

== Chihuahua ==
Chihuahua norteño is unique in that it uses the saxophone in addition to the traditional accordion, and thus has two lead instruments. Zacatecas norteño is similar to norteña chihuahuense.

== Durango ==
Durango is widely famous for its Duranguense music, a fast-paced, brass-heavy genre that emerged from the state's musical traditions and became popular in the 2000s, particularly among Mexican-Americans in Chicago and the wider U.S. and Mexican communities. While inspired by Durango, the genre was largely created and popularized by bands in Chicago, blending traditional elements like polka and corrido with electronic sounds and characterized by its "pasito duranguense" dance and Western wear.

In Mexico, Durangense bands normally consist of multiple band members because of the instruments they need to make the music. Duranguense bands are basically considered música norteña, but they use brass and wind instruments instead of guitars and accordions. Duranguense bands are often called Banda … or Los … de Durango.

== Guerrero ==
Guerrero has its own traditional "son" tradition, known as "Son Guerrerense", which has a violin lead, with guitar and percussion for the rhythm section. The son music of Tierra Caliente is very closely related to this tradition. "Gustos" are another very popular song form in Guerrero, and these are played at half-tempo (in relation to the sones). Violinist Juan Reynoso is a renowned interpreter of the music from this region.

Many musical bands sound comes from the Norteño music of Michoacán, yet also the rich folk music tradition of this backcountry mountainous state informs original compositions (ex. Modesta Ayala). The Jaripeo is a powerful influence on Guerrero banda music today. Jaripeos are the popular local musical bull riding events featuring young bull riders, a 12+ piece brass band, cattle hands, rodeo announcer, dancing, clowns, families, kids, village officials, and drunks. Top Bandas in northern Guerrero are Autoridad de la Sierra, La Banda Dominguera, Los Indomables. Typical professional village bands include Santa Cecilia (Axixintla) and La Rancherita (Tecalpulco).
In almost every town and city in Guerrero, musicians of many backgrounds play for money. The music coming up from the rocky valleys of mineral Guerrero derive from Spanish ballads with a heavy frontier admixture. Still today rural musicians gather for all-night stylized musical jam sessions of "bolas" and "corridos". These are both folk verse renditions of traditional vocal and guitar expressions. The musical trios that proliferate in the streets and popular markets of Guerrero perform songs of venerable composition.
"With both western and prehispanic musical heritage, emerges a sonorous phenomenon transcendental for America. This had and has a significance of great importance for the development of the villages. With the ferocious and pitiless conquest, takes place a combination of rape by force and home invasion generating new structures. In the case of band music, a group of instruments or a combination of metals, percussions, woods…"
"One of the most extended genres of America and especially in Mexico is the corrido; what's more it is the county where its diffusion reaches surprising ranges…" "In Guerrero and particularly in the zone of Zapatista influence Michoacán, Morelos, State of Mexico, Puebla, Oaxaca, the corrido reaches creative dimensions without comparison in the Mexican popular lyric. Work that is awaiting the specialists."

== Jalisco ==
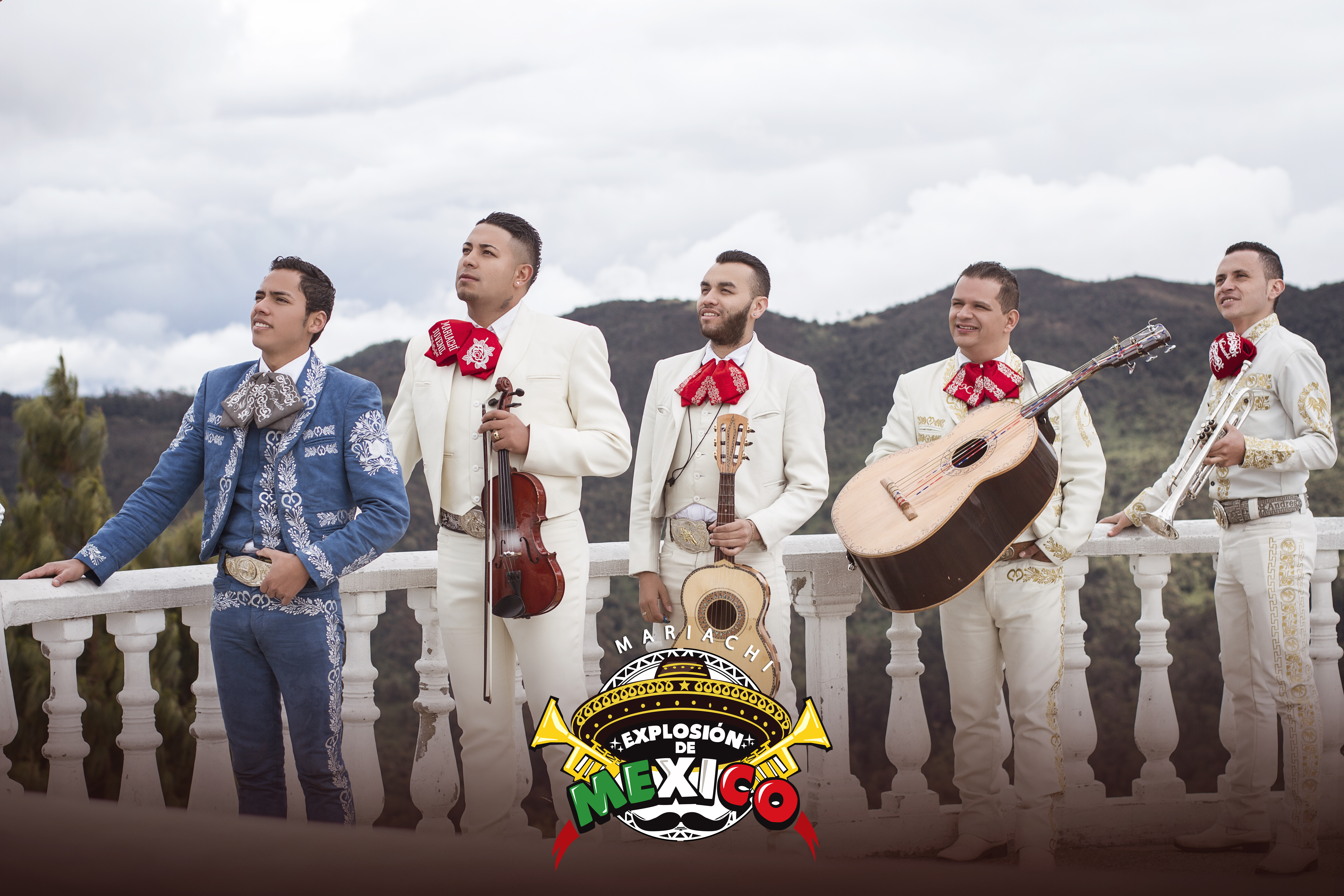
Example of a Mariachi group

Jalisco's jalisciense son is the most traditional and representative style of folk music of the mariachi tradition. El Son de la Negra is one of the pieces more representative. In the 1990s, bands such as Banda Machos, and Banda Maguey popularized techno-banda. These bands were the music for the popular dance quebradita.

== Mexico City ==
The regional music of Mexico City includes danzon, a Cuban style of music which also developed in Mexico City (in El Salón México) and Veracruz. It is comparable to tango for its elegance and complex structure. Cha-cha-cha is also an important style which was played a lot in the past century, it was very popular in Mexican films. Mambo, created by Cachao López in 1938 in Cuba, derives from Cuban style of music called rumba and was popularized by Perez Prado in Mexico City where he lived from 1948 to 1989. Mexican bolero also originated in Mexico City, one of the most important Bolero singers is Agustín Lara.

== Michoacán ==
Michoacán's regional music includes Pirekua a song form of the Purépecha (Michoacán, Mexico). The singer of a pirekua, a pirériecha, may be male or female, solo or accompanied, and pirekua may be performed instrumentally. Pirériechas act as social mediators and "express sentiments and communicate events of importance to the Purépecha communities."

== Nayarit ==
Nayarit is recognized for Huichol music, the most notable band being El Venado Azul. Nayarit Huichol bands often play traditional ranchero and corrido songs with unique homemade violins and guitars.

== Nuevo León ==
Nuevo León norteño bands resemble traditional norteño tejano (Texan norteño) somewhat more closely than other norteño bands due to Nuevo León's proximity to the southwestern American state of Texas.

== Oaxaca ==
Oaxaca has a musical tradition/style known as Son istmeño (es), which is a continuation of the son folk tradition found throughout Mexico (as well as Cuba and Puerto Rico). Although many songs are translated and sung in Zapotec language as well; the rhythms and the basic melodic/harmonic structure are of Spanish origin. The song "La Llorona" is an example of a son istmeño. Marimba ensembles are also found here.

Oaxaca also has many traditional Brass Bands, sometimes called Tambora Oaxaqueña, the music is very similar to the Balkan Music, and it is believed that they are both from the same roots. Bakanic composer, Goran Bregovic, made concerts in Mexico, with bands from Oaxaca.

== Sinaloa ==
Sinaloa is widely famous for banda, or Mexican big band music. Sinaloa was where the musical genre originated. Bandas play a wide variety of songs, include rancheras, boleros, and cumbias. Bandas often adapt songs from other duranguense and norteño bands. Sinaloa also has produced famous norteño artists, such as Calibre 50, and El Veloz de Sinaloa.

== Tamaulipas ==
Tamaulipas norteño is similar to Nuevo León norteño. It also has Huapango (also known as Son Huasteco) music.

== Veracruz ==
Veracruz has a unique style in music, it is called Son Jarocho and it is played with some guitar-like instruments called "Jaranas". Recently the harp forms an important part of Son Jarocho. I Grupo Mono Blanco are a very influential band. In the capital Danzon is very popular and it is performed in the street. In the north of Veracruz Huapango (also known as Son Huasteco) music is more popular. Boleros are also very important in Veracruz.

== Yucatán ==
Yucatán has its own musical traditions, one in particular known as "música/danza jarana." Although the jarana is the main/central instrument in a typical ensemble, other kinds of guitars are utilized. The local music generally includes both very strong Spanish and indigenous influences as well as, to an extent, Caribbean influences. Vocal harmonies also contribute to the trademark sound of Yucatán. "Son Yucateco", the traditional son music of the region, was also probably an influence on the Cuban-born bolero, and there is a strong connection between the music of Yucatán, Mexico and the music of Cuba. Boleros and "música trova", a Cuban musical tradition, also have a very important place in música Yucateca.

== Zacatecas ==
Bandas in Zacatecas play what it is known as "Tamborazo Zacatecano", the bands are formed with a drum and wind instruments. A notable band is La Banda Jerez. Also, Zacatecas norteño closely resembles that of Chihuahua norteño because of saxophone-accordion duets in their music.
