= Grupera =

Genre of Regional Mexican music

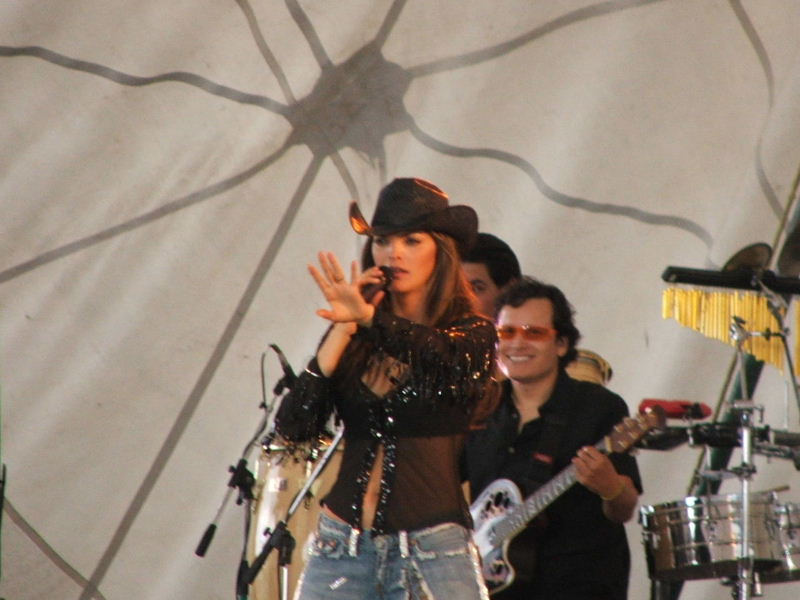
- Ana Bárbara singing in concert
- Other names: Onda Grupera
- Stylistic origins: Latin rock; latin pop; mariachi; cumbia; bolero; norteño
- Cultural origins: Early 1970s, Mexico
- Typical instruments: Vocals; electric guitar; electric bass; keyboards; drums; percussion

Grupera (also known as Grupero or Onda Grupera) is a subgenre of regional Mexican music. It reached the height of its popularity in the 1990s, especially in rural areas. Grupera music traces its roots to the rock groups of the 1960s, yet has evolved significantly over time. Typically performed by ensembles of four or more musicians, the genre prominently features electric guitars, electronic keyboards, and drums. The popularity of grupera music surged notably during the 1980s, propelling it into commercial viability and establishing its place within the Latin music landscape. Today, the genre is widely acknowledged and celebrated in prestigious Latin music awards ceremonies such as Lo Nuestro Awards and the Latin Grammy Awards, reflecting its enduring influence and cultural significance across Latin America and beyond. Grupera music is a distinct Mexican musical genre that blends traditional ranchera melodies with influences from norteño and other regional styles like corridos, cumbias, charangas, ballads, boleros and huapangos.

Some of the most recognized groups and artists in the grupera genre include Los Bukis, Los Temerarios, Bronco, Los Yonic's, and Grupo Bryndis. Grupera music has enjoyed great popularity in Mexico and other parts of Latin America, and continues to be an important part of Mexican musical culture.

== History ==
The original wave of Mexican rock bands got their start mostly with Spanish covers of popular English rock songs. After this initial stage, they moved on to include in their repertoire traditional ranchera songs, in addition to cumbias and ballads. Thus, the 1970s saw the rise of a number of grupera bands that specialized in romantic ballads and songs that up to that point had only been sung with mariachi.

The name grupera comes from the fact that many of the bands had names starting with Grupo (Group). Most of these groups had a rural origin and many previously played rock music. According to Madrid, cited by Rivera Godina, the grupero movement had its peak in the 1970s with many famous artists who were included under the label tropical music, such as Mike Laure, Rigo Tovar, Chico Che, among others, both Mexican and from other countries, who fused romantic ballads with more danceable rhythms, such as Los Baby's, Los Freddy's, Los Corazones Solitarios, Los Pasteles Verdes, Los Barón de Apodaca, and Los Caminantes. Under the influence of the music and film industries, the most well-known norteño bands became synonymous with grupero.

In the 1990s, the term grupero and its variations started to be part of Mexico's music industry and began to receive media attention, including different bands such as Los Temerarios, Los Bukis, Los Tigres del Norte, Bronco, La Mafia, La Industria del Amor, Conjunto Primavera, Ana Bárbara, Grupo Bryndis, Los Acosta, Liberación, Grupo Mandigo, Mi Bande El Mexicano, Banda Machos and, as the first American artist popular on both sides of the border, Selena. The media industry popularized this term to generate products based on grupera, such as the radio station XEQR-FM, whose slogan was Salvajemente grupera (savagely grupero), specialized magazines like Furia Musical and cable channels like Bandamax. Enterprises like Televisa included bands from the grupera wave like Bronco in telenovelas such as Dos mujeres, un camino. Later, tropical cumbia artists such as Celso Piña, Margarita la Diosa de la Cumbia, and Los Ángeles Azules would be included under the term grupera.

A turning point in the development of grupera was the popularization of groups based on banda sinaloense mainly through Banda El Recodo and others like La Original Banda El Limón and La Arrolladora Banda El Limón.

In the early 2000s, in Mexico the term Regional Mexican began to be used. Regional Mexican music had already been used for several years in the United States to refer homogeneously to the regional variations of rural Mexican music and avoid including tropical music artists under the label. Meanwhile, grupera came to refer specifically to the bands and solo artists that use electric guitars and basses, electronic keyboards and drums, but that played ballads, cumbias, rancheras, corridos, boleros and huapangos, with said genre being one of many styles under the Regional Mexican umbrella.

== Awards ==
- Latin Grammy Award for Best Grupero Album
