= Hoy Como Ayer =

Single by Conjunto Primavera
- Released: 2005
- Recorded: 2005
- Genre: Norteño-sax ballad
- Length: 4:31
- Label: Fonovisa
- Songwriter: Coco Villalobos

Conjunto Primavera singles chronology
"Aun Sigues Siendo Mia" (2005)	"Hoy Como Ayer" (2005)	"Muero" (2005)

"Hoy Como Ayer" ("Today Like Yesterday") is a song performed by Mexican norteño-sax band Conjunto Primavera. Released in 2005 as the first single from the album of the same name, the song became their first number-one single in the Billboard Top Latin Songs chart, as well as peaking number-one on the Billboard Regional Mexican Airplay.

The track debuted in the Billboard Regional Mexican Songs chart on January 29, 2005 at number 34 and climbed to the top five of the chart two weeks later. "Hoy Como Ayer" peaked at number-one on February 26, 2005 for week and later spent two consecutive weeks number-one. The song was given both a Lo Nuestro award and a Billboard Latin Music award for "Regional Mexican Song of the Year" in 2006.

== Chart performance ==
Chart (2005)	Peak position
US Billboard Top Latin Songs	1
US Billboard Regional Mexican Songs	1
