= Quebradita =

Mexican dance style

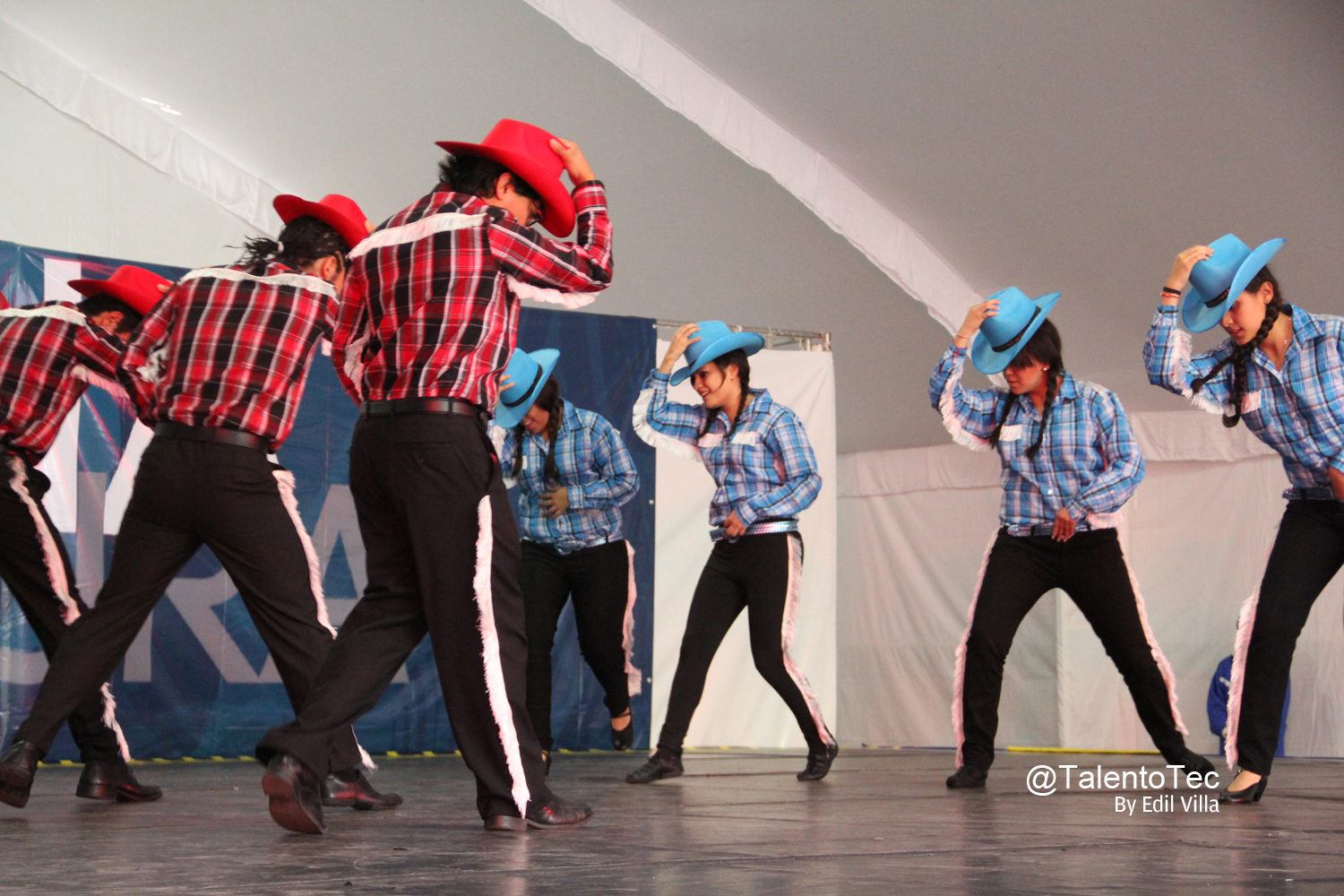
Students at the Monterrey Institute of Technology and Higher Education, Mexico City dancing in the quebradita style

The quebradita (Spanish: "Little break", referring to the breaking of a wild horse and a female dancer's back bends) is a Mexican dance style. It is usually performed to a Regional Mexican song, specifically a lyrical charanga or instrumental mambo. The dance style was made especially famous by the Regional Mexican subgenre of Technobanda.

In the quebradita there is a male dancer and a female dancer. The male dancer lowers the female dancer backwards almost to the point where she touches the floor. Then the male dancer quickly pulls her up. This is what the "little break" refers to. Compared to the brinquito or caballito dance styles, which use athletic, trotting steps, quebraditas emphasize acrobatics. The musical instruments from popular quebradita groups are electric guitars and instruments with synthesizers.

The quebradita was very popular in the 1990s, especially in the Los Angeles metropolitan area. George Lipsitz, author of Footsteps in the Dark: The Hidden Histories of Popular Music, wrote that in that era many dancers were unwilling or unable to do this dance because of the required strength, timing, coordination, and cooperation, and therefore the possible dangers from this dance.

== History ==
In a 2002 encyclopedia article on the quebradita, Sydney Hutchinson, the author, wrote that some people believe that the form originated from the U.S.-Mexico border area while some believe it originated in Jalisco or Sinaloa, and that the history of the dance form is "somewhat hazy". A California State University, Northridge professor of Chicano studies, Everto Ruiz, stated that the music has its origin from Sinaloan music. California residents gave the new dancing style the name quebradita. In the early 1990s, this dance form became popular in Los Angeles and the Southwestern United States. Many communities and schools had quebradita dance groups staffed by young people. In the 2002 encyclopedia article, Hutchinson stated that the music continues to be performed along the U.S.-Mexico border at concerts, nightclubs, and parties, but that the quebradita had "significantly declined" in popularity as a performance and competition dance.

== See also ==
- Mexican-Americans in Los Angeles
