= Lorenzo de Monteclaro =

Regional Mexican-American Musician

Lorenzo de Monteclaro (born September 5, 1939) is a singer of regional Mexican music. He was born as Lorenzo Hernández in Cuencamé de Ceniceros, Durango, and sang for the first time on radio in the late 1950s on a Sunday talent contest called "Aficionados de los Ejidos" on XEDN (Torreón, Coahuila). His signature subgenre is norteño-sax, but he has also recorded songs with banda and mariachi. He has sung on more than 90 albums and acted in almost 50 films and continues singing even after seven decades. His youngest son, Ricardo de Monteclaro, is also the drummer who plays in his father's band.

== Discography (partial) ==
Chaparrita Pelo Largo (1977)

Ese Señor de las Canas (1978)

Grandes Éxitos del Ausente (1979)

Los Mejores Corridos de Contrabando (1980)

Acompañado por el Grupo de Rogelio Gutiérrez (1981)

15 Auténticos Éxitos (1982)

Con Banda Sinaloense (1983)

Hipócrita (1984)

De Esta Sierra a la Otra Sierra (1985)

16 Grandes Éxitos (1986)

Corridos Famosos (1987)

Boleros de Siempre con Banda Sinaloense (1988)

Tesoros Musicales [CBS] (1988)

La de la Boca Chiquita [1989]

Solo Eres Tú (1989)

Canciones de Siempre con Lorenzo de Monteclaro y la Banda Los Escamilla (1991)

Persica (1991)

Tesoros Musicales [Sony] (1991)

De Monteclaro Reyes Avitia (1992)

Indiscutíblemente (1996)

Lorenzo de Monteclaro (1992)

Corridos con Banda (1992)

Personalidad (1992)

De Mil Amores (1993)

20 De Colección (1994)

Brillantes (1994)

Digan lo que Digan (1995)

Lorenzo de Monteclaro y sus 15 Grandes Éxitos (1995)

Mexicanísimo: 20 Éxitos (1995)

Econo Series (1997)

Raíces de Música Norteña (1997)

Raíces de la Música Norteña (1998)

20 Éxitos (2000)

Mis Mejores Años (2000)

Sensación de Lorenzo de Monteclaro (2000)

Esto es lo Mejor: 20 Exitos (2002)

30 Éxitos Insuperables (2003)

Mis 30 Mejores Canciones (2003)

Estrellas y Relampagos (2005)

15 Éxitos (2006)

30 Éxitos de Siempre (2006)

Ausente (2006)

Ídolos de Siempre (2006)

Raíces de Nuestra Música (2006)

Cuando los Hijos se Van (2008)

El Amor No se Vende (2008)

== Filmography (partial) ==
Me Caí de la Nube (1974)

Los Tres Compadres (1975)

Dios Los Cría (1977)

Tierra Sangrienta (1979)

Las Tres Tumbas (1980)

Pistoleros Famosos (1981)

La Cosecha de Mujeres (1981)

Las Ovejas Descarriadas (1983)

El Hijo del Viento (1986)

Ser Charro es Ser Mexicano (1987)

Adorables Criminales (1987)

Nacidos Para Triunfar (1994)

La Carga de Tunas (2003)
