= No Puedo Olvidarte =

2005 song by Beto y sus Canarios

Single by Beto y sus Canarios

from the album Ardientes
- Released: 2005
- Genre: Tierra Caliente ranchera
- Length: 2:38
- Label: Disa Records
- Songwriter: Cuauhtémoc González García

"No Puedo Olvidarte" (transl. "I Can't Forget You") is a Spanish-language song written by Cuauhtémoc González García and recorded by regional Mexican band Beto y sus Canarios. It was also the lead single from the Ardientes album. The song reached number one on the Billboard Regional Mexican Airplay chart in 2005.

== Weekly charts ==
Chart (2005)	Peak position
US Hot Latin Songs (Billboard)	6
US Regional Mexican Airplay (Billboard)	1
