= Que Ganas de Volver =

Studio album by Conjunto Primavera
- Released: February 5, 2008
- Genre: Norteño-sax
- Length: 34:00
- Label: Fonovisa
- Producer: Jesús Guillen

Conjunto Primavera chronology
El Amor Que Nunca Fue (2007)	Que Ganas de Volver (2008)	Dejando Huella: El Final (2008)

Professional ratings
Review scores
Source	Rating
Allmusic	3.5/5 stars

Que Ganas de Volver (Eng.: I Want to Return) is the title of a studio album by Mexican norteño-sax band Conjunto Primavera. It was released on February 5, 2008. This album became their fifth number-one set on the Billboard Top Latin Albums.

== Track listing ==
The information from Billboard.

No.	Title	Writer(s)	Length
1.	"La Gran Señora"	Homero Aguilar Sánchez	3:14
2.	"El Cobarde"	José Alfredo Jiménez	3:21
3.	"Estando Yo Contigo"	José A. Morante	2:58
4.	"Ya No Vuelvas"	Oswaldo Villarreal	3:18
5.	"Cuando"	Tony Meléndez, Ernesto Cortázar, Edgar Cortázar	3:16
6.	"Quiero Que Vuelvas"	Manuel Eduardo Castro	3:00
7.	"Egoista"	Miguel Arriaga, Gabriel Flores	3:55
8.	"Te Lloré"	Reyli	3:36
9.	"Volver"	Ricardo Montaner, Yasmil Marrufo	3:56
10.	"Sentí"	Erika Vidrio	3:49

== Personnel ==
This information from Allmusic.

- Jesús Guillén — Producer
- Tony Gonzáles — Engineer, mastering, mixing
- Conjunto Primavera — Art direction
- Félix Contreras — Art direction
- Adriana Rebold— Graphic design, art direction
- Kike San Martin — Photography

== Charts ==
=== Weekly charts ===
Chart (2008)	Peak position
Mexican Albums (AMPROFON)	64
US Billboard 200	87
US Top Latin Albums (Billboard)	1
US Regional Mexican Albums (Billboard)	1

=== Year-end charts ===
Chart (2008)	Position
US Top Latin Albums (Billboard)	49
