= Ansia de Amar =

Studio album by Conjunto Primavera
- Released: April 3, 2001
- Recorded: 2000–2001
- Genre: Norteño-sax
- Label: Fonovisa

Conjunto Primavera chronology
El Recado de mi Amor (2000)	Ansia de Amar (2001)	Perdóname Mi Amor (2002)

Professional ratings
Review scores
Source	Rating
Allmusic	3/5 stars

Ansia de Amar (Eng.: Longing to Love') is the title of a studio album by Mexican norteño-sax band Conjunto Primavera released on April 3, 2001. This album became their second number-one hit on the Billboard Top Latin Albums chart. Finally, this is the first album without re-recordings since Amigo mesero of 1994, because the next albums until Morir de Amor have re-recordings. This album was the first of drummer Daniel Martinez, after the departure of Adán Huerta in 2000.

== Track listing ==
This track listing from Billboard.com.

1. No Te Podias Quedar (Ramón González) — 3:56
2. Quiero Verte Otra Vez (Eloy Bernal) — 2:16
3. Irremediablemente (Marco Pérez/René Trevizo) — 3:29
4. No Sé Vivir Sin Ti (Gerardo Franco) — 3:34
5. Regresa a Mi Lado (Miguel Angel Meléndez) — 2:19
6. De Golpe en Golpe (Teodoro Bello) — 2:59
7. Derecho a la Vida (Cuco Sánchez) — 3:26
8. El Más Triste (Jesse Armenta) — 2:47
9. Si Te Vuelvo a Ver (Dario Mirana) — 3:23
10. Amiga (Lito Solanas) — 3:01

== Credits ==
This information from Allmusic.

- Conjunto Primavera: Artistic director
- Jesús Guillén: Executive producer
- Mario Alanis: Engineer
- Marin Morales: Engineer
- Gilbert Velasquez: Mixing
- Víctor Manuel Mata: Art direction, artistic director
- John Coulter: Graphic design
- Henry Brun: Photography

== Chart performance ==
Chart (2001)	Peak position
US Billboard Top Latin Albums	1
US Billboard Regional/Mexican Albums	1
US Billboard Top Independent Albums	4
US Billboard 200	139

== Sales and certifications ==
Region	Certification	Certified units/sales
United States (RIAA)	Gold	500,000^{^}
^{^} Shipments figures based on certification alone.
