= Dejando Huella =

Greatest hits album by Conjunto Primavera
- Released: April 20, 2004
- Genre: Norteño-sax
- Label: Fonovisa

Conjunto Primavera chronology
Decide Tú (2003)	Dejando Huella (2004)	Hoy Como Ayer (2005)

Dejando Huella (Eng.: Leaving a Mark) is the title of a compilation album by Mexican norteño-sax band Conjunto Primavera. This album became their third number-one set on the Billboard Top Latin Albums.

== Track listing ==
The information from Billboard

=== CD track listing ===
No.	Title	Writer(s)	Length
1.	"Una Vez Más"	Juan Gabriel	2:42
2.	"No Te Podías Quedar"	Ramón González Mora	3:55
3.	"El Más Triste"	Jesse Armenta	2:45
4.	"Por las Calles de Chihuahua"	Homero Prado	2:33
5.	"Irremediablemente"	Marco Pérez, Rene Treviño	3:28
6.	"Y Qué Me Importa"	Mario Sánchez	3:29
7.	"Perdóname Mi Amor"	Mora	3:43
8.	"Actos de un Tonto"	Mora	3:48
9.	"No le Ruegues"	Armenta	3:07
10.	"Vete Con el Mi Amor"	Mora	2:40
11.	"Me Nortié"	Armenta	2:41
12.	"Derecho a la Vida"	Cuco Sánchez	3:25
13.	"De Nuevo a tu Lado"	Miguel Meléndez	2:49
14.	"Necesito Decirte"	Mora	3:44
15.	"Borracho (Live)"	Felipe Valdez Leal	3:49
16.	"Amiga"	Lito Solanas	2:56
17.	"Si Te Vuelvo a Ver"	Darío Miranda	3:21
18.	"Jugando al Amor"	Oscar Ochoa	3:04
19.	"Tengo Celos"	Mario Sánchez	2:44
20.	"México, Ra, Ra, Ra"	Armenta	4:00

=== DVD track listing ===
This information from Allmusic.

No.	Title	Writer(s)	Length
1.	"No Te Podías Quedar"	Mora	4:00
2.	"No Le Ruegues"	Armenta	3:11
3.	"Necesito Decirte"	Mora	3:44
4.	"Perdoname Mi Amor"	Mora	3:43
5.	"Una Vez Más"	Gabriel	2:42

== Chart performance ==
Chart (2004)	Peak position
US Billboard Top Latin Albums	1
US Billboard Regional/Mexican Albums	1
US Billboard Top Heatseekers	1
US Billboard 200	107
