= Banda Pachuco =

Banda Pachuco is a regional Mexican band formed in Los Angeles, California, in 1993. They specialize in the technobanda genre. They reached No. 5 in the Billboard Hot Latin Tracks with their song "Mitad Tu, Mitad Yo", in 1995. They made a big hit with their album Terco Corazon, released in 1998 and welcoming a new singer, Neo Serrato. At the start of the year 2000 they made a new album, "Sueno Con Salma". On that same album, the song "Aqui Ya De Nada Sirvo", composed by José S. Corral, made a big hit throughout all Latin America. By the following year, Neo Serrato left the band to start a solo career.

== Discography ==
- 1994: Pachuco bailarín (Album debut and first on Fonovisa Records)
- 1995: Sabor a chocolate
- 1995: Por los caminos de la vida
- 1996: Lowrider
- 1997: La más querida
- 1998: Terco corazón (Last album on Fonovisa Records)
- 2000: Sueño con Salma (First album on Luna/Sony Music)
- 2001: Pierdete conmigo
- 2002: Quedate conmigo
- 2003: Moviendo tu censurado (Last album on Luna/Sony Music)
- 2006: Infierno y gloria (Only album on Batuta Records)
- 2008: Quiero contigo (First album on Balboa Records)
- 2009: Lo qué siento por ti
- 2012: Loco suicida
