= Está Llorando Mi Corazón =

2004 song by Beto y sus Canarios

Single by Beto y sus Canarios

from the album 100% Tierra Caliente
- Released: 2004
- Recorded: 2004
- Genre: Tierra Caliente ranchera
- Length: 2:54
- Label: Disa Records
- Songwriter: Cuauhtémoc González García

"Está Llorando Mi Corazón" (transl. My Heart is Crying) is a Spanish-language song written by Cuauhtémoc González García and recorded by regional Mexican band Beto y sus Canarios. It is also the lead single from their album 100% Tierra Caliente. The song reached #1 on the Regional Mexican Airplay in late 2004. The song won the award for Regional Mexican Airplay of the Year by a Male Group at the 2005 Latin Billboard Music Awards.

The single peaked at No. 1 on the Oct. 16, 2004-dated chart, where it reigned for 12 weeks.

== Awards ==
Year	Award	Category	Result	Ref.
2005	Billboard Latin Music Awards			
2005	Billboard Latin Music Awards	Regional Mexican Airplay of the Year by a Male Group	Won	

== Chart performance ==
=== Weekly charts ===
Chart (2004)	Peak position
US Hot Latin Songs (Billboard)	3
US Regional Mexican Airplay (Billboard)	1

=== Year-end charts ===
Chart (2004)	Peak position
US Hot Latin Songs (Billboard)	28
US Regional Mexican Airplay (Billboard)	3
