= El Sinaloense =

"El Sinaloense" ("The Sinaloan") is a song written by Daniel Pescador in 1984. "El Sinaloense" is often considered Mexican banda music, but it can be performed in any regional Mexican subgenre. It is a son/huapango.

== Significance ==
"El Sinaloense" is one of the most popular songs in the Banda genre. It has been recorded by hundreds of recording artists in both lyrical and instrumental versions. Many Sinaloans consider it their unofficial anthem.
