= ¡Qué Chulada! =

¡Qué Chulada! may refer to:

- ¡Qué Chulada! (album), a 2007 album by La Dinastía de Tuzantla
- ¡Qué Chulada! (TV program), a 2020 TV program broadcast by Imágen Televisión
