= Banda Arkángel R-15 =

Mexican band

Banda Arkángel R-15 is a regional Mexican band founded by Jesus Navarro in Las Varas, Nayarit in 1992. The band is one of the best known in the Technobanda genre. The R15 in the band's name represents a type of assault rifle commonly known in the banda mafia genre. Their record labels were Fonovisa (1990–1998), Sony BMG (1999–2003), and Caro Music (2006-present).

Their best known hits include "Bailame Quebradito", "La Quebradita", "Goza mi cumbia", and "El Brinque y Brinque".
