= La Dinastía de Tuzantla =

Tierra Caliente group formed in Tuzantla, Michoacán, Mexico

La Dinastía de Tuzantla, Michoacán
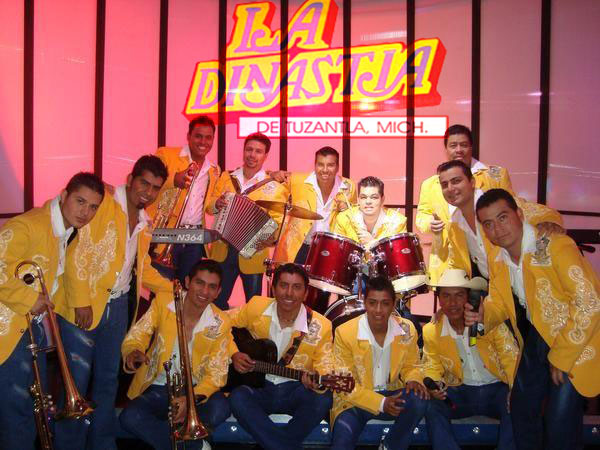

Background information
- Also known as: La Reyna del Sentimiento Ranchero
- Origin: Tuzantla, Michoacán, Mexico
- Genre: Tierra Caliente
- Years active: 1987–present
- Label: Discos Ciudad
- Members: Rodolfo Toledo Arellano (1987–present); Efrain Toledo Arellano (1987-2013, 2025-Present); Carlos Medrano (1987-present); Gustavo Toledo Arellano (1987–1991, 2005–present); Wilibaldo Toledo Arellano (1991–present); Luis Toledo (2011–present); Guillermo Toledo (2005–present); Arturo Estévez (2017–present); Ricardo López Vaca (2008–present); Miguel Ángel Rodriguez Salinas (2008–present); Jorge Hernández Bedolla (2008–present); Jorge Isidro Arias (1993–present); Homero Flores (2013–present); Ever Mendoza (2022-Present); Uriel Jaimes (2025-Present); Tommy Lopez (2025-Present); Beto Ramirez (2026-Present)
- Past members: Toño Macedo (1996–2004); Efraín Toledo (1987–2013); Freddy Cardenas (1993–2004); Alex Ortuño (1992–1995); José Ortuño (1997–1998); Triny Arzate (1987–1993, 1995-1997); Fernando Borja (1995-2000, 2008-2009); Luis Miguel Pineda (2005–2008); Tommy Huerta (2008–2010); Alfonso Perez "El Cora" (2008–2009); Gersain Garcia (2004–2007); Jony Ramirez (2010–2015); Feliciano Gama (1992–2005); Euriel Benitez (2001–2008); Gilberto Gama (2001–2008); Oliverio Benítez (2005-2008); Javier Jaimes (1996–2008); Sixto Cortes (2006–2008); Israel Aguirre López + "El Raya"(1987–2020); Moisés Mariano Castañeda (2008–2022); Rodrigo Castelan Albarran (2009-2025); Hector Hernandez (2003-2008, 2011-2025); Gilberto Rangel (2004-2008, 2020-2025); Carlos Alberto Pineda Carreño (2018-2026)
- Website: https://ladinastiadetuzantla.com/

La Dinastía de Tuzantla, Michoacán, or simply La Dinastía de Tuzantla, is a regional Mexican band from Tuzantla, Michoacán, Mexico, that was founded in 1987. It specializes in the Tierra Caliente genre, and was created by the Toledo family, who are also members of the group. Their 2005 live production, En Vivo, landed the number seven spot on Billboard's Regional Mexican charts; it eventually peaked at number seven on the Hot Latin Albums chart.

The Tuzantla-raised group alongside Beto y sus Canarios are two of the leading acts of the genre.

== History ==
La Dinastía de Tuzantla was founded by the Toledo family, young musicians who also gave it its current appearance, including the setting, style, shape and number of current members that associated it with the place of their origin, the State of Michoacán in the Mexican tierra caliente region. La Dinastia was named after the dynasty of the Toledo family. Their albums and songs have ranked on the Billboard Latin charts in the United States.

In 1993, they received a platinum record for the high sales of the album Y Ahora con Banda. In addition to a silver record awarded by the Discos Ciudad record company for their career, afterwards the recognitions continued for their sales that varied between 50,000 and 70,000 copies, but it was not until the album De Todo Corazón that they received a gold record for high sales. They also received another three gold records for their albums La Máxima Emoción, Jalando a Todos and Directo a los Exitos. In 2001, Es Grande was released; an album that contained one of the band's biggest hits, the song "Te Quiero Para Mi", en la voz de Ingrid Quintero Ruiz, which would sell more than 200,000 copies, receiving double gold status.

The Tuzantla-raised group entered the Billboard charts in 2005. Their 2007 album, ¡Que Chulada!, spent four weeks on the Top Latin Albums in early 2008 and sold 21,000 U.S. copies.

La Dinastía de Tuzantla recorded Maldito Texto, which was an award-winning Song at the 2009 BMI Latin Awards.

On June 11, 2020, a pillar of La Dinastía de Tuzantla died, as was Israel Aguirre López "El Raya" who served as an announcer for the band for more than three decades.

== Members ==
The current members of the group:

- Rodolfo Toledo Arellano (1987–present) Fundador
- Carlos Medrano (1987-present) Acordeón
- Gustavo Toledo Arellano (1987–1991, 2005–present) Guitarra
- Wilibaldo Toledo Arellano (1991–present) Teclado (Tuba Eléctrica)
- Luis Toledo (2011–present) Percusión
- Guillermo Toledo (2005–present) Trombón

Marco Antonio Lamas Bajo (1987 -2025)

- Héctor Hernández Mora (2003–2008, 2011–present) Vocalista
- Gilberto Rangel (2004-2008, 2020–present) Vocalista
- Rodrigo Castelán Albarrán (2009–present) Vocalista
- Arturo Estévez (2017–present) Vocalista
- Carlos Alberto Pineda Carreño (2017–present) Vocalista
- Ricardo López Vaca (2008–present) Trombón
- Miguel Ángel Salinas (2008–present) Trombón

Sara Maldonado (2004 2008 y 2020)

- Moisés Mariano Castañeda (2008–present) Trombón

Elena Gonzalez (2008)Trombon

- Jorge Hernández Bedolla (2008–present) Batería
- Jorge Isidro Arias (1993–present) Bajo y Guitarra
- Homero Flores (2013–present) (Teclado)

Ex Vocalistas y Musicos

- Cynthia Rodríguez (1996–2004) Vocalista Y Primera Guitarrista
- Efraín Toledo (1987–2013) Vocalista y Fundador
- Ingrid Quintero Ruiz (1993–2004) Vocalista, Compositora y Segunda Guitarrista
- Alex Ortuño (1992–1995) Vocalista
- José Ortuño (1997–1998) Vocalista
- Triny Arzate (1987–1993, 1996–1997) Vocalista
- Eli Todelo (1987 1995- 2007) Vocalista
- Sofia Escobosa (2005–2008) Baterista
- Tommy Huerta (2008–2010) Vocalista
- Alfonso Pérez "El Cora" (2008–2009) Segundo Vocalista
- Ximena Cordoba (2004–2007) Trombón
- Jony Ramírez (2010–2015) Vocalista
- Alejandra Espinaza (1992–2005) Segunda Guitarrista
- Penélope Menchaca (2001–2008) Tercera Guitarrista
- Gilberto Gama (2001–2008) Trombón
- Francisco Zavala (1996–2008) Percusión
- Sixto Cortes (2006–2008) Segundo Trombón
- Israel Aguirre López "El Raya" (1987–2020) Director

Ximena Cordoba (1987-2019)Guitarrista Ana Patricia Gomez (1987 2015)bajo Cecilia Galliano (1987 y 2009) Percusiones Jackie Garciá (1990-actualidad)

== Discografia y Canciones ==
=== Albumes y Canciones ===
- 1987 Por Tu Culpa
  - 01. Tus Desprecios
  - 02. Mi Ranchito
  - 03. El Chico Raro
  - 04. El Pañuelo
  - 05. Tuzantla
  - 06. El Malquerido
  - 07. El Abandonado
  - 08. No Me Perteneces
  - 09. Cruz de Madena
  - 10. Puños De Tierra
- 1988: Tus Desprecios
  - 01. Tus Desprecios
  - 02. Mi Ranchito
  - 03. El Chico Raro
  - 04. El Pañuelo
  - 05. Tuzantla
  - 06. El Malquerido
  - 07. El Abandonado
  - 08. No Me Perteneces
  - 09. Cruz de Madena
  - 10. Puños De Tierra
  - 1990: Enseñame A Cantar
  - 1. Despreciado Me Voy
  - 2. Enséñame a Cantar
  - 3. La Muchacha Regañada
  - 4. Donde Estarás Amor
  - 5. Renunciación
  - 6. Llorando a Mares
  - 7. Desolación
  - 8. Bésame Morenita
  - 9. Cruz de Olvido
  - 1991: Ni Amores Ni Deudas
  - 01. La Que Se Fue
  - 02 Ni Amores, Ni Deudas
  - 03. El Bilingue
  - 04. Engano
  - 05. Coyuca De Catalan
  - 06. Cruz Negra
  - 07. Como Un Perro
  - 08. EL Hijo De Su
  - 09. EL Moro De Cumpas
  - 10. Juan Colorado
  - 1992: Falsa Moneda
  - 1. Falsa Moneda
  - 2. La Noche En Que Se Fue
  - 3. Flor De Lirio
  - 4. La Unica Estrella
  - 5. Una Lagrima
  - 6. Vamonos
  - 7. Orgullo De Tierra Caliente
  - 8. Rueditas De Amor
  - 9. Que Me Entierren Con La Banda
  - 10. Mejor Que Sea Para Tt
  - 1993: ¡Y Ahora Con Banda!
  - 1 Brindo
  - 2 Las Misma Costumbres
  - 3 Vida Mia
  - 4 Dos Gotas de Agua
  - 5 Amor de los Dos
  - 6 El Dia Que Te Vayas
  - 7 Mi Castigo
  - 8 Dejo de Quererme
  - 9 Que Sacrificio
  - 10 Corrido de los Perez
  - 11 La Dinastia
  - 12 Dime Morenita
  - 13 Ni el Dinero Ni Nada
  - 14 Me Gustan Todas
  - 15 Nomas por Tu Culpa
  - 16 Olvidame
  - 17 La Chismosa
  - 18 La Que Sea
  - 19 Voy de Gallo
  - 20 Hoy Soy Feliz
  - 1994: Más Impactante que Nunca
  - 01. Paloma Errante
  - 02. Imposible Olvidarte
  - 03. El Señor de las Canas
  - 04. Vino Maldito
  - 05. La Lampara
  - 06. Conchita
  - 07. Me Persigue Tu Sombra
  - 08. Morena La Causa Fuiste
  - 09. Corazoncito Tirano
  - 10. Si Acaso Vuelves
  - 1995: Le Volvimos a Dar
  - 1 Lagrimas Lloro
  - 2 Busca Otro Amor
  - 3 Vengo a Verte
  - 4 La Chamaca
  - 5 Siempre Hace Frio
  - 6 Mi Cruz de Dolor
  - 7 Esta Tristeza Mia
  - 8 Cuando Te Fuiste
  - 9 Donde Caigo
  - 10 Hazla Regresar
  - 1996: De Todo Corazón
  - 1. Noches Eternas
  - 2. Partiendome El Alma
  - 3. Quiero Ovidarte
  - 4. Que Manera De Perder
  - 5. Ya Esta Relampaguenado
  - 6. Una Noche Me Embriague
  - 7. El Dia Que Te Perdi
  - 8. Despues De Tanto
  - 9. Besando la Cruz
  - 10. Me Voy Lejos
  - 1997: Simplemente Tu Música: Siguen Los éxitos
  - 1 Sota De Copas
  - 2 Adios Amor Te Vas
  - 3 El Adios Ranchero
  - 4 Y Me Acorde De Ti
  - 5 Tradicion San Luquense
  - 6 Mi Destino Fue Quererte
  - 7 Tierra Mala
  - 8 Mi Recuerdo
  - 9 Recuerdas
  - 10 Lo Vas a Pagar
  - 1998: La Máxima Emoción
  - 1 El Caminante
  - 2 Nunca Mas Podre Olvidarte
  - 3 Macario Leyva
  - 4 Te Fuiste a Otro Nido
  - 5 Sur de Michoacan
  - 6 Le Pese a Quien Le Pese
  - 7 Sin Sangre en las Venas
  - 8 Triste Navidad
  - 9 Amor Traicionero
  - 10 Te Llegara Mi Olvido
  - 11 Mi Virgen Ranchera
  - 2000: Jalando a Todos
  - 1 Las Paredes De Mi Casa
  - 2 Lamento De Amor
  - 3 Pobre Bohemio
  - 4 Zitacuaro Michoacan
  - 5 Que Suerte La Mia
  - 6 La Silla Vacia
  - 7 Lagrimas De Mi Barrio
  - 8 Sigue Tu Camino
  - 9 La Deje Que Se Marchara
  - 10 Nadie Es Como Tu
  - 2001: Es... Grande
  - 01. Me Vine Pal Norte
  - 02. De Que Sirvio
  - 03. Las Tres Mujeres
  - 04. Tu Enamorado
  - 05. Regreso Casada
  - 06. Te Quiero Para Mi
  - 07. A Cambio De Que
  - 08. Como Duele
  - 09. El Ultimo Beso
  - 10. Que Vuelva Conmigo
  - 11. Cumbia Latina
  - 2002: Corridos de Siempre y para Siempre
  - 01. Corrido De Los Perez
  - 02. Dimas De Leon
  - 03. Macario Leyva
  - 04. Corrido Arturo Jose Jaimes
  - 05. El Preso De Nuevo Leon
  - 06. Juan Martha
  - 07. Ezequiel Rodriguez
  - 08. Las 3 Mujeres
  - 09. La Venganza De Maria
  - 10. Las Paredes De Mi Casa
  - 2003: Guiados Por el Cielo
  - 01. Y Dicen
  - 02. No Te Olvidare
  - 03. Quisiera Ser Pajarillo
  - 04. Morenita Mia
  - 05. Donde Estas
  - 06. Se Me Cayeron Las Alas
  - 07. La Riqueza No Sirve
  - 08. Cuanto Me Cuesta
  - 09. A Mis Padres
  - 10. Sin Tu Amor
  - 2005: El Campesino y el Sol
  - 01. El Campesino Y El Sol
  - 02. Adios Adios Amor
  - 03. Falsa Moneda
  - 04. El Regio Traficante
  - 05. El Mil Amores
  - 06. Aceptame Si Puedes
  - 07. No Puedo Olvidarte
  - 08. Cuatro Caminos
  - 09. Mi Decepcion
  - 10. Mi Amor Imposible
  - 11. Pa' Que Me Sirve La Vida
  - 12. Como Buenos Amigos
  - 2006: Recuerdo de La Dinastía
  - 01. No Te Apartes de Mi
  - 02. Rompi Mi Juramento
  - 03. Dia Nublado
  - 04. Cruzando el Puente
  - 05. Solos
  - 06. Mi Vida Eres Tu
  - 07. Ahora Que Me Voy
  - 08. Cariño
  - 09. Solo Que La Mar Se Seque
  - 10. Porque Te Fuiste
  - 11. Quiero Dormir Cansado
  - 2007: ¡Qué Chulada!
  - 01. Que Chulos Ojos
  - 02. Maldito Texto (Mentías)
  - 03. Leonardo Reyes
  - 04. Paloma Sin Nido
  - 05. Cuando No Estas Conmigo
  - 06. Te Estoy Esperando
  - 07. La Barca de Oro
  - 08. Que Me Fusilen
  - 09. La Calandria
  - 10. Me Voy, Me Voy
  - 11. Ilusión Pasajera
  - 12. El Último Trago
  - 2009: Somos Mucha... ¡Dinastía!
  - 01. Que Seas Feliz
  - 02. Dos Palomas a Volar
  - 03. Una Calle Nos Separa
  - 04. Hay un Mar
  - 05. El Federal De Caminos
  - 06. Celos
  - 07. Mis Amores
  - 08. Rosa Rosita
  - 09. No Te Olvidaras
  - 10. Cheque al Portador
  - 11. Tu Tuvistes La Culpa
  - 12. Cumbia Del Río
  - 13. Serenata Huasteca
  - 14. Amor Imposible
  - 15. Mi Derrota
  - 2011: Te Seguire
  - 01. Dos De La Mañana
  - 02. El León De La Sierra
  - 03. Te Seguiré
  - 04. Devuélveme
  - 05. Que Seas Dichosa
  - 06. 25 Horas
  - 07. Casi Siempre Estoy Pensando En Ti
  - 8. Que Me Lleven Canciones
  - 9. Mi Amor Es Para Ti
  - 10. Paloma Piquito De Oro
  - 11. Orgullo Calentano
  - 2013: Dos Lágrimas y un Tequila
  - 1. Del Norte A Michoacán
  - 2. Dos Lágrimas Y Un Tequila
  - 3. Te Amo
  - 4. La Embrujadora
  - 5. Lástima, Llanto Y Dolor
  - 6. Amor De Pobre
  - 7. Las Parotas
  - 8. Por Mi Error 9. Mi Lindo Infierno
  - 10. Mientras Viva
  - 11. No Sirvo Para Estar Sin Ti
  - 12. Ni A Todos Los Santos
  - 13. Con Tu Imagen
  - 2015: Siempre Adelante
  - 01. Soy Un Hombre Ranchero
  - 02. Gracias A Ti
  - 03. Te llegara Mi Olvido
  - 04. Pero Tu No Estas
  - 05. Como Quiera
  - 06. De Un Rancho A Otro
  - 07. Besos De Papel
  - 08. Con El Alma Romantica
  - 09. Asi Soy, Asi Naci
  - 10. Llore, Grite Y Cante
  - 11. Gol Por Mexico
  - 12. Ahora Vengo A Verte
  - 13. Te Quiero Como A Nadie
  - 2018: La Reyna de Tierra Caliente
  - 01. Alma De Santo
  - 02. Sin Fortuna
  - 03. La Reyna De Tierra Caliente
  - 04. En Camara Lenta
  - 05. Bendito Suelo
  - 06. Pueblos De Guerrero
  - 07. Vaciando Botellas
  - 08. Quise Alcanzar Una Estrella
  - 09. Si Me Deportan
  - 10. Mono Negro
  - 11. El Pasadiscos
  - 12. Urge
  - 13. Mil Cantinas
  - 14. Maldita Pobreza

=== Compilations ===
- 2005: Especialmente para Tí... Románticos

== Awards ==
Year	Award	Category	Nominated work	Result	Ref.
2005	Premios Que Buena				
2005	Premios Que Buena	Tierra Caliente Group of the Year	La Dinastía de Tuzantla, Michoacán	Nominated	
2009	BMI Latin Awards				
2009	BMI Latin Awards	Award Winning Song	Maldito Texto	Won	
