= ¡Qué Chulada! (album) =

Studio album by La Dinastía de Tuzantla
- Released: December 4, 2007
- Recorded: March – November 2007
- Genre: Tierra Caliente
- Length: 35:02
- Label: Discos Ciudad

La Dinastía de Tuzantla chronology
Recuerdo de La Dinastía (2006)	¡Qué Chulada! (2007)	Somos Mucha... ¡Dinastía! (2009)

Singles from ¡Que Chulada!
- 1. "La Barca de Oro" Released: April 2007; 2. "Que Chulos Ojos" Released: July 2007; 3. "Maldito Texto" Released: November 2007; 4. "Te Estoy Esperando" Released: February 2008

¡Qué Chulada! is a studio album by Tierra Caliente band, La Dinastía de Tuzantla, released on December 4, 2007. The album spent four weeks on the Billboard Top Latin Albums chart in early 2008 and sold 21,000 copies in the U.S.

The album includes the single "Maldito Texto" which was an award-winning song at the 2009 BMI Latin Awards.

== Track listing ==
The information from AllMusic.

No.	Title	Writer(s)	Length
1.	"Que Chulos Ojos"	Amparo Higuera	2:42
2.	"Maldito Texto (Mentías)"	Eliud Garza, Adolfo Valenzuela & Omar Valenzuela	3:29
3.	"Leonardo Reyes"	Lalo Mora	3:18
4.	"Paloma Sin Nido"		2:53
5.	"Cuando No Estas Conmigo"		3:09
6.	"Te Estoy Esperando"		3:14
7.	"La Barca de Oro"		3:05
8.	"Que Me Fusilen"		2:31
9.	"La Calandria"	Nicandro Castillo	2:18
10.	"Me Voy, Me Voy"		2:40
11.	"Ilusión Pasajera"	Marco Antonio Solis	3:20
12.	"El Último Trago"	José Alfredo Jiménez	2:23
