= Tierra Cali =

Mexican band

Tierra Cali was a regional Mexican band from Michoacán formed in 1998 and composed of five brothers. The group's specialty was the Tierra Caliente genre. They had several charting records in the United States throughout the years; they were very popular in Guatemala and Mexico and constantly sold-out events in venues in the United States. Their biggest hit singles were "Si Tú Te Vas" and "Amor Te Amo", which reached the top 10 on the Billboard regional Mexican charts.

In early 2025, Tierra Cali's lead singer Humberto Plancarte left the band to start a solo career. Since April of that same year, the remaining members now perform under the name of Los Hermanos Plancarte de TC.

== Members ==
- Humberto Plancarte (Vocals and Producer)
- Rafael Plancarte (Bass)
- Cruz Plancarte (Background Vocals)
- Arcadio Plancarte (Keyboards)
- Afraín Plancarte (Drums)
- Oliverio Benítez (Brass)
- Rivaldo Jesús Carranza (Brass)
- Marco Antonio Alvarado (Keyboards)
- Armando Farfán (Keyboards)

== Discography ==
- Tierra Cali (2002)
- No Pares No (2003)
- El Arroyito (2004)
- El Pescado Nadador (2005)
- Alegria Calentana (2006)
- Enamorado de Ti (2007)
- Grandes Exitos Originales (2007)
- Mas Alla de la Distancia (2008) U.S. #158
- Si Tú Te Vas (2009) U.S. #128
- Ultimate Collection "14 Hits" (2009)
- Maldito Amor (2010) U.S. #150
- En Vivo Desde La Tierra Que Los Vio Nacer (2010)
- Un Siglo de Amor (2011)
- Entregate (2012)
- Románticos del Momento (2013)
- Homenaje a Tierra Caliente (2014)
- Enamorado de Ti... (Los Creadores del Sacadito) (2015)
- Si Tú Te Vas (Los Creadores del Sacadito) (2015)
- Enamorado de Ti (2015)
- #Hashtag y lo Más Trending (2015)
- Por Siempre (2017)
- Promoviendo La Humildad (2018)
- Éxitos De Siempre (2021)
- Estaré Bien (2021)
- Sueltenme El Toro (2021)
- Sacaditos Para Bailar En Vivo (2022)
- No Tardes Más (2022)
- Mujer Comprada (2022)
- Dime La Verdad (2022)
- A Quién Le Importa (2023)
- Tu Tienes La Culpa (2023)
