= Severiano Briseño =

Severiano Chávez
- Born: Severiano Briseño Chávez; 21 February 1902; San José de Canoas, San Luis Potosí, Mexico
- Died: 6 October 1988 (aged 86) Mexico City, Mexico
- Genres: Banda music, ranchera
- Occupations: Singer, composer
- Instruments: Vocals, violin and guitar
- Years active: 1935–1988
- Formerly of: Lucha Reyes

Severiano Briseño Chávez (21 February 1902 – 6 October 1988) was a Mexican composer. He was a founding partner of the national society of authors and composers, Sociedad de Autores y Compositores de México (SACM).

== Biography ==
On 21 February 1902, he was born in the small mountain village of San José de Canoas (today part of Rioverde municipality) in the state of San Luis Potosí, to father Ramón Briseño and mother Petra Chavez. At six years of age, his family emigrated to the Huasteca region. From an early age, he had an inclination towards music, and his ability to compose songs was encouraged by his parents. His first song, called Escolleras, was dedicated to the Tamaulipas port of Tampico and the song was well received because townsfolk were honoured to have been mentioned.

Severiano Briseño Married Jovita Marquez in Altamira, Tamaulipas on 7 June 1932.

With his brothers Guillermo and Rafael, he formed the Trío Los Tamaulipecos, and the band was popularly hired for nighttime serenades. Later it gained popularity when one of his songs, El toro requesón, was recorded for the soundtrack of the 1937 film Cuatro milpas. His songs started to achieve increasing popularity, especially Caminito de Contreras and Ya lo pagarás con Dios, which was performed by Lucha Reyes and Ranchera singer Vargas de Tecalitlán.

Later, he composed El corrido de Monterrey, a composition which led him to find patrons amongst the upper class of the capital of Nuevo León. In mid-1945, they performed El corrido de Monterrey on a national radio program. Increasing fame and support was obtained by those living in Sinaloa when he composed El Sinaloense, the hit that popularized his performing group Trío Los Tamaulipecos. The definitive triumph of the song occurred when the Banda Los Guamuchileños incorporated it to its repertoire. Throughout the 50 years since it was composed, this ranchera song has become one of the most popular songs in the Banda music Genre. As such it has been recorded or performed by renowned artists such as Lola Beltrán, El Charro Avitia, Valentín Elizalde, Piporro, Juan Gabriel, Luis Aguilar, and hundreds of others.

In 1945 he was part of the group of authors and composers who founded the Society of Authors and Composers of Mexico. He died on 6 October 1988.
