= Beto y sus Canarios =

Tierra Caliente group formed in Huetamo, Michoacán, Mexico

- Also known as: Los #1 de Tierra Caliente, La Pesadilla Musical
- Origin: Huetamo, Michoacán, Mexico
- Genres: Tierra Caliente, Norteño-sax
- Years active: 1987–2023, 2024–present
- Labels: Discos Ciudad (1987–2001), Disa (2002–2011), Cactus Jack Records, Parral
- Members: Alfonso "El Cora" Pérez 2000–2004, 2024–present; Manuel "many" Pérez 2007–2018, 2024–present; Carlos Alberto Pineda Carreño 2026-Present; Pedro Pineda 1999–2023, 2024–present; Federico "Fede" Núñez 2024–present; Samuel JR Sánchez 2024–present; Isaías Varona Cervantes 2024–present; Alejandro Arroyo Aguilar 2024–present; Carlos eleazar yañez hernandez 2024–present
- Past members: Cuauhtémoc González García 1995–2007, 2024-2026; Gabino García Palacios 1987–2013; Eduardo Lucas Cervantes 1993–2023; Manuel Pérez 2007–2018; Alfonso "Cora" Pérez 2000–2004; Epigmenio Gaytán †, 1999–2020; Artemio García Palacios 1995–2013; Cresencio Abarca 1998–2009; José Cadenas 1987–1998; Indalecio Castelán 2009–2019; Luis Ramón Oviedo 2000–2007; Samuel Martínez 1997–2001; Miguel Ángel Navarro 1998–2021; Norberto Cortes 2002–2021; José Alberto Cortes 2007–2022; Andrique Morales 2004–2023; Pedro Pineda Díaz 1999–2023; Humberto Santibañez Pineda 2011–2023; Alexis Cortes 2013–2023; Trino Villaseñor 2013–2023; Andrés Abarca 2018–2023; Zirahuen Gaspar 2018–2023; Juan Fernando Ochoa González 2019–2023; Osvaldo Garcia 2020–2022; Sotero Garcia Flores 2020–2023; Felipe Rojas Estrada 2020–2023; Mauricio Pascual 2020–2023; Juan Pablo Almada 2020–2023

Beto y sus Canarios were a regional Mexican band formed in Huetamo, Michoacán, Mexico. It was founded in 1987 by Gabino García and Edilberto Portillo. After releasing several albums, in 2001, the group released their album "Tuve Una Novia", featuring the single "Noche Eterna", which became a number-one hit in the Billboard Hot Latin Songs chart.

The Huetamo-raised group and their compatriots, La Dinastía de Tuzantla, are two pioneers in exploiting Tierra Caliente music.

== History ==
The Calentano band Beto y sus Canarios was formed in 1987 in Huetamo, Michoacán, Mexico, in the Tierra Caliente region (Spanish for Hot Land). The musical director Gabino García approached Edilberto Portillo with the proposal at the beginning of that year and the two went to work to audition and recruit members, establishing themselves as musicians who had not been in any kind of musical group before theirs.

It took the ensemble seven months of rehearsal and organization before they began playing for community events and social gatherings. Early recordings generated local hits that became regional hits. Songs like "Mi Ultimo Contrabanda" and "Carga Fina" caught the ear of audiences outside of Mexico, and the group was soon offered opportunities to travel and perform throughout the United States.

Beto y sus Canarios has two songs in Billboard's Top 20 Regional Mexican Songs of All Time, with "Está Llorando Mi Corazón" and "No Puedo Olvidarte" ranking #15 and #7 respectively.

Epigmenio Gaytán, who was the keyboardist in for the group, died due to the COVID-19 pandemic in Mexico.

== Discography ==
=== Albums ===
- 1993: Con Cartitas (first album on Discos Ciudad / DLV)
- 1994: Puras de Arranque
- 1996: Banda Armada
- 1997: Pura Carga Fina
- 1998: A Quién Esperas
- 1999: Que Dios Te Bendiga
- 2001: Tuve Una Novia (last album on Discos Ciudad / DLV)
- 2002: Mi Despedida (first album on Disa)
- 2004: 100% Tierra Caliente
- 2005: Ardientes
- 2006: Contigo por Siempre
- 2007: Gracias
- 2009: Loco Por Tu Amor
- 2010: De Parranda en Parranda (last album on Disa)
- 2012: Sin Reversa (only album on Vene Music)
- 2014: Por Todo Tierra Caliente (first album on Morena Music)
- 2015: Homenaje al Poeta Gracias Joan Sebastian
- 2016: Al Estilo de Mi Rancho
- 2019: Al Fin Te Encontré a Ti
- 2021 Especial 34 Aniversario
- 2021 Amores Aventureros

=== Singles ===
- 2004: "Está Llorando Mi Corazón"
- 2005: "No Puedo Olvidarte

== Awards ==
Year	Award	Category	Nominated work	Result	Ref.
2001	Billboard Latin Music Awards				
2001	Billboard Latin Music Awards	Regional Mexican Airplay of the Year by a Male Group	Noche Eterna	Won	
2006	BMI Latin Awards				
2006	BMI Latin Awards		No Puedo Olvidarte	Won	
2005	Premios Que Buena				
2005	Premios Que Buena	Banda Song of the Year	Está Llorando Mi Corazón	Nominated	
2005	Premios Que Buena				
2005	Premios Que Buena	Tierra Caliente Group of the Year		Nominated	
