= Banda Maguey =

Music group

- Also known as: La estrella de los bailes.
- Origin: Villa Corona, Jalisco, Mexico
- Genres: Technobanda
- Years active: 1991–present
- Labels: FonoVisa, Musivisa, RCA, Sony Music Latin

Banda Maguey (nickname: "La estrella de los bailes") is a regional Mexican band from Jalisco, Mexico. They originated in Villa Corona, also the home of Banda Machos, who along with Banda Maguey have been called the two most successful exponents of the technobanda sound. Banda Maguey was led by their singer Ernesto Solano who has also composed a number of their songs, including Pero Te Amo, a hit from their fourth album, El Mundo Gira. In 1998, Banda Maguey signed a record deal with BMG U.S. Latin and recorded Lágrimas de Sangre.

A favorite during the 1990s technobanda craze, Banda Maguey took over the radio waves with their debut album Tumbando Caña in 1994, which contained a number of hits including "El Alacrán" a cover originally sung by La Sonora Matancera. Signed to Fonovisa a year earlier, Banda Maguey took over their native town with their onda grupera style. In May 1994, the band performed live for the first time in the United States. In 1995, Banda Maguey released La Estrella de los Bailes, which featured the singles Como la Luna, Si Tú No Estás, Que Sacrificio, and Eva María that climbed local charts.

In 2012–13, former lead vocalist Ernesto Solano spent several months in jail on charges that he had been misusing the name of the band in connection with his solo career.

== Official discography ==
- Tumbando Caña (1993) (First album and only on MCM, today Warner)
- La Estrella de los Bailes (1995) (First album on Fonovisa)
- Tu Eterno Enamorado (1996)
- El Mundo Gira (1997)
- Lágrimas de Sangre (1998) (First album on BMG)
- Exitos En Vivo (1998) (Live album)
- Mil Gracias (1999)
- Escorpión (2000)
- Canciones de Mi Pueblo (2001)
- Me Recordarás (2002)
- Metamorfosis (2003) (Last album on Fonovisa)
- XV+2 (2006) (Only album in Viva Music)
- Como México No Hay Dos (2007) (First album on Three Sound Records)
- Para Que No Me Olvides (2009)
- Pa' Que Veas Lo Que Se Siente (2009)
- Lo Que Son las Cosas (2012)
