= Banda music =

Style of Mexican music heavy on brass and percussion

- Stylistic origins: March music; military band; polka; waltz; Mexican son; ranchera; corrido
- Cultural origins: Mid-19th century in Sinaloa
- Typical instruments: Vocals, sousaphone, tenor horns, trumpets, trombones, clarinets, snare drum, tambora, baritone horn
- Derivative forms: Duranguense

Banda is a subgenre of regional Mexican music and type of ensemble in which wind (mostly brass) and percussion instruments are performed.

The history of banda music in Mexico dates from the middle of the 19th century with the arrival of piston brass instruments, when community musicians tried to imitate military bands. The first bandas were formed in southern and central Mexico. Many types of bandas exist in different territories and villages, playing traditional or modern music, organized privately or municipally.

== Traditional ensembles ==
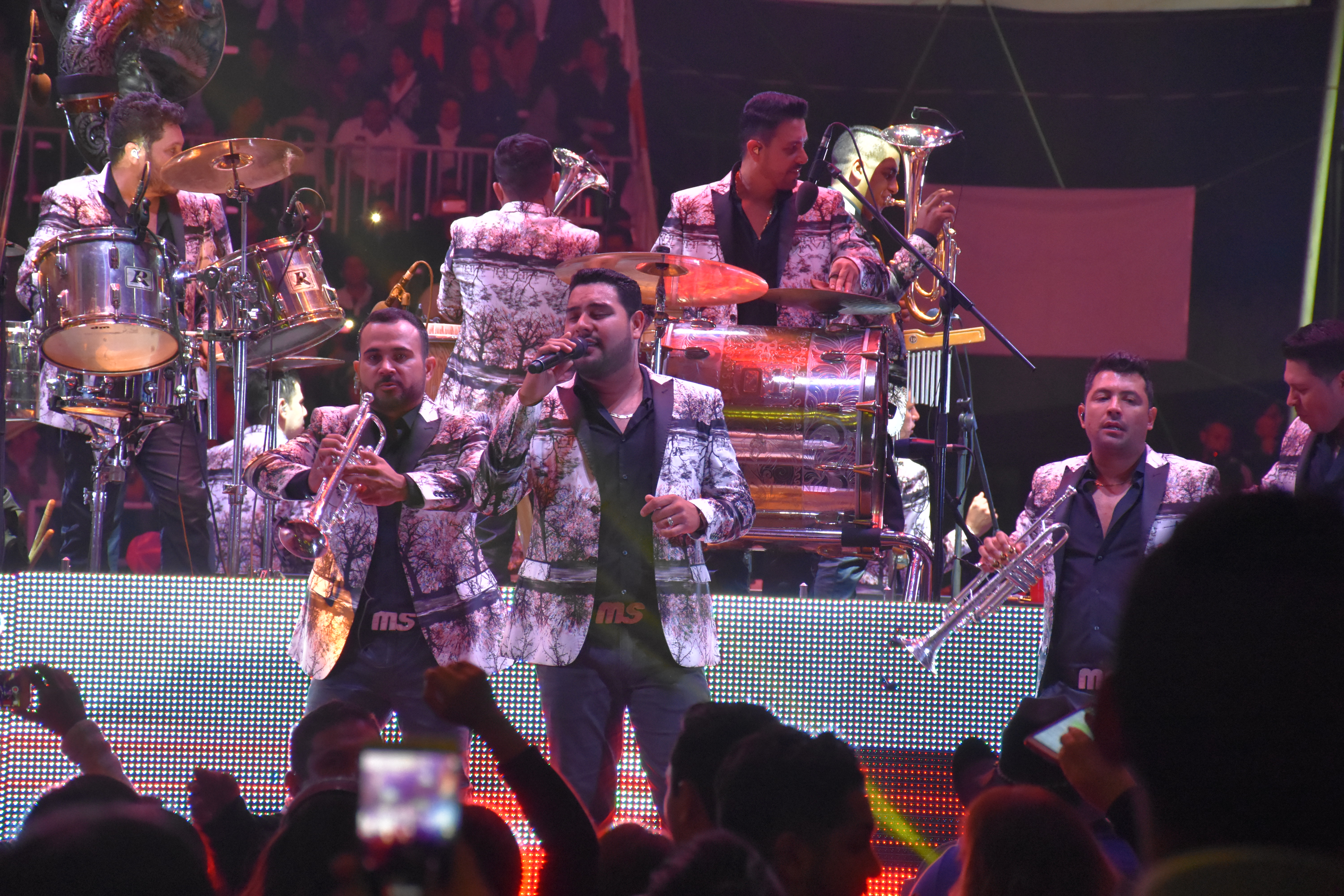
Banda MS performing at the Feria de Cholula, in 2016.

Brass instruments in the state of Oaxaca of European origin that date back to the 1850s have been found. The repertoire of the bands of Morelos, Guerrero, Oaxaca, Chiapas and Michoacán covered gustos, sones, vinuetes, funeral pieces, marches, danzones, valses, corridos, paso dobles, polkas, rancheras, alabanzas, and foxes. Traditional bands that play Yucatecan Jarana are instrumented with clarinet, tenor saxophone, baritone saxophone, trumpet, trombone, timbales, snare drum, bass drum, cymbals, and güiro.

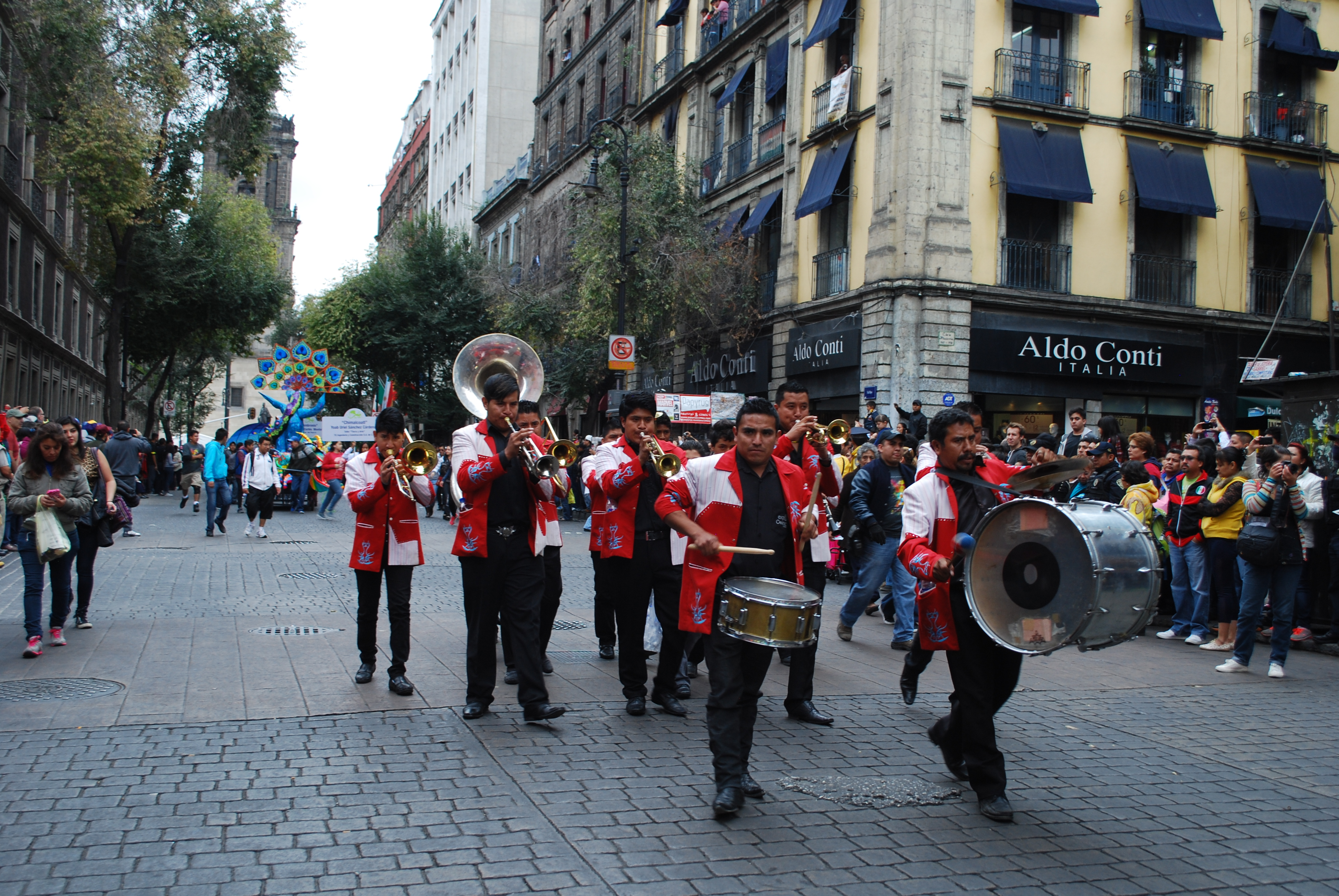
Banda Reflejo Sinaloense on parade in Mexico City (2015)

Traditional Oaxacan bands use a mix of tuba, saxophones and clarinets, fewer trumpets and more tenor trombones, and the bass drum and cymbals are played separately.

One of the oldest bands recorded in history is the Banda de Tlayacapan of the state of Morelos, founded approximately in 1870 and being one of the first to play la danza del Chinelo.

Traditional Zacatecan tamborazo bands do not use tuba, the tambora taking the bass voice instead.

== Repertoire ==
Brass bandas play a wide variety of song styles including rancheras, corridos, cumbias, charangas, ballads, boleros, salsas, bachatas, sones, chilenas, jarabes, mambos, danzones, tangos, sambas, bossa novas, pasodobles, marches, polkas, waltzes, mazurkas, chotís, and swing.

Perhaps the most popular song played by bandas is "El Sinaloense" ("The Sinaloan"), written by Severiano Briseño in 1944. "El Sinaloense" has been recorded by hundreds of bandas, in both lyrical and instrumental versions. The song has become so popular that many Sinaloans consider it their unofficial anthem.

== History ==
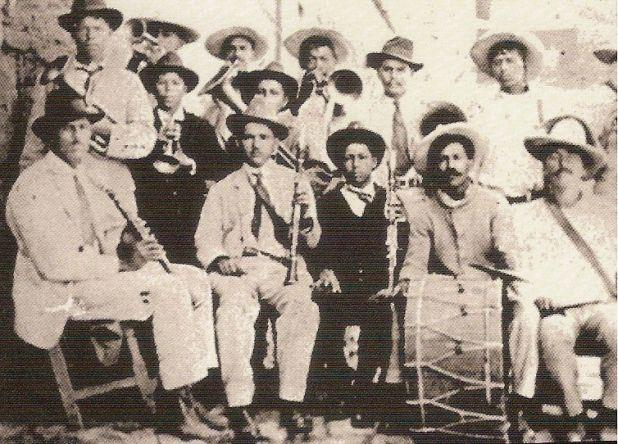
Banda in Sinaloa (1900)

Banda music in Mexico dates from the middle of the 19th century during the Second Mexican Empire with the arrival of piston metal instruments, when the communities tried to imitate the military bands. In each village of the different territories there are certain types of wind bands, whether traditional, private or municipal.

Banda music was established in the 1880s in the Mexican state of Sinaloa and expanded to other nearby states in the 1890s. Its roots come from the overlapping of Mexican music with polka music. At the time, many Germans and lived in the states of Sinaloa, Chihuahua, Oaxaca, Yucatan, Jalisco and Nuevo León. This greatly influenced northern Mexican music. Immigrants from northern Mexico brought the music to the United States. Initially popular in the southwest United States, primarily in Texas, California, and Arizona, banda has followed the movement of Mexican immigrants to the Midwest United States and the rest of the country. Mexicans who came in contact with Latin-based Jazz of Chicanos or Mexicans born and raised in the United States adopted jazz-like sounds in banda to further enrich the music type.

Despite some having provided the music for solo vocalists such as José Alfredo Jiménez and Antonio Aguilar in years past, when it came time to record their own music, brass bandas almost exclusively performed instrumentals. In 1989, Banda El Recodo was the first brass banda to record songs with its own official vocalist, inspiring most bandas to follow suit. Famous banda soloists include Jenni Rivera, Julio Preciado, Lupillo Rivera, Valentín Elizalde, Pepe Aguilar, Joan Sebastian, José Manuel Figueroa, Pancho Barraza, El Chapo de Sinaloa, El Coyote, El Potro de Sinaloa, Adán Sánchez, Sergio Vega, Espinoza Paz, Roberto Tapia, Julión Álvarez, Larry Hernández, Gerardo Ortíz, Regulo Caro, Luis Coronel, El Dasa, Leonardo Aguilar, Remmy Valenzuela, and Alfredo Olivas. Chalino Sánchez and Juan Gabriel also contributed to banda music.

Throughout the 20th century, brass banda music's mainstream popularity was traditionally confined to the state of Sinaloa. However, starting in the late 1980s and throughout the 1990s, it gained ground in the rest of Mexico's pacific states, as well as a number of central states. By the new millennium, however, brass banda started to become popular throughout the rest of Mexico, eventually becoming the most popular Regional Mexican subgenre for several years.

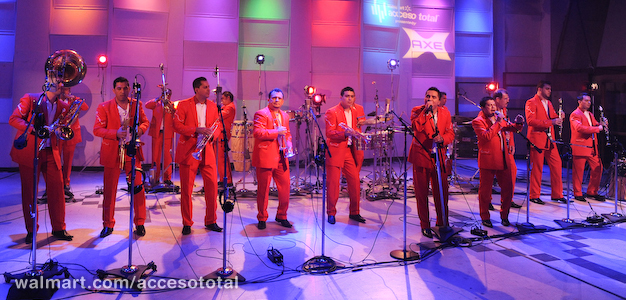
La Arrolladora playing in 2012

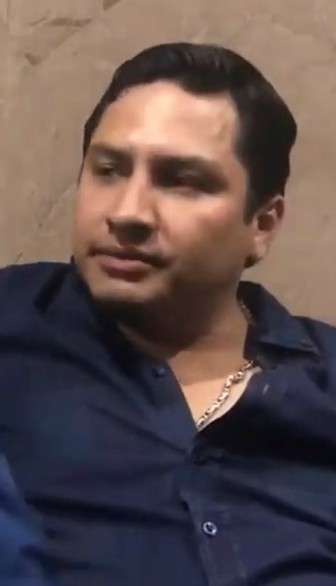
Julión Álvarez, a famous Banda singer (2019)

Despite banda being male-dominated, there are a number of female soloist banda singers such as Graciela Beltrán, Diana Reyes, Beatriz Adriana, Yolanda Pérez and Carmen Jara. Jenni Rivera, the highest-earning solo banda singer of all time, has been credited with bringing a female perspective to what had historically been a male-dominated genre. While not known primarily as banda singers, Ana Bárbara and Ninel Conde have also recorded in the genre.

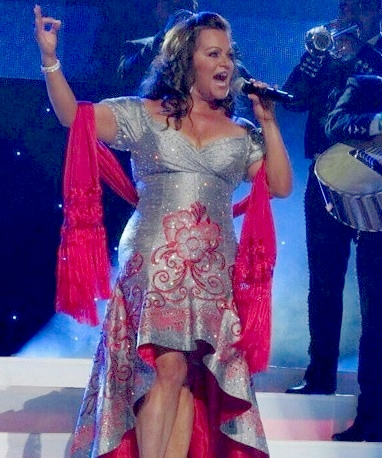
Jenni Rivera performing a few months before her death in 2012. Known as La Diva de la Banda (the Banda Diva), she remains the highest-earning banda singer to date.

The 2010s wave of popularity of the tuba in southern California has been credited to its presence in banda music. As of 2017, El Salvador started having its own Banda music.

== Traditional brass banda sound ==
A standard Sinaloa-style banda is made up of brass, woodwind, and percussion instruments. The most notable instrument is the tambora, a type of bass drum with a head made from animal hide, with a cymbal on top. Bandas were previously called "tamboras," named after this drum. The tambora is played in a strong and embellished manner, which provides the drive for the rest of the band. The percussion section also includes the tarola, which is a snare with timbales resembling the tom-toms on a regular drum set, cowbells, and cymbals. Banda el Recodo, one of the most famous bandas, features three trumpets, four clarinets, three valve trombones or slide trombones (the former being more common), two E♭ alto horns, and one sousaphone.

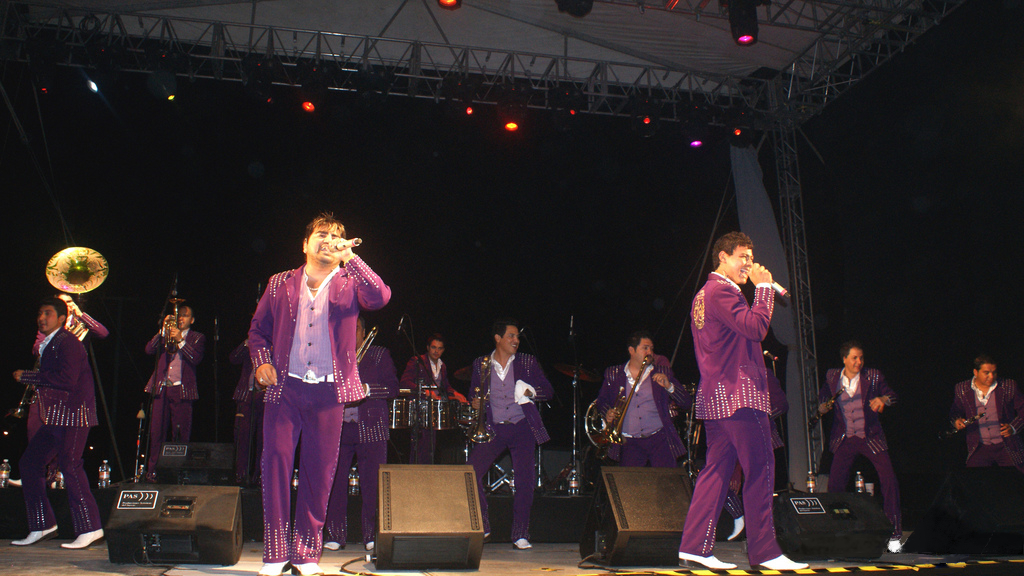
Banda el Recodo performing in Cancún in 2009

Like an orchestra, a banda can be organized into different sections.

- Bass: The lowest-pitched part is played by the sousaphone (referred to as a "tuba" in Mexico).
- Percussion: Tambora (a large bass drum) with a cymbal on top.
- Harmony: Two Armonias, "charchetas" or "saxores" in Mexico (E♭ alto horns), play using different rhythms, depending on the style.
- Tenor: valve trombones or slide trombones play in the lower register.
- Alto: Trumpets play in the upper register.
- Soprano: Clarinets and sometimes saxophones play as "singing" instruments that may double the voice.
- Vocals: Banda el Recodo has two vocalists, while Banda Jerez has one. However, some bandas consist of as many as three vocalists.

Most banda arrangements feature three-part harmony and melodic sections which contrast the timbres of the clarinet, trumpet, and valve trombone or slide trombone sections.

Historically, bandas were village brass bands called on to entertain the town, and would play anything from opera overtures to big band jazz. This tradition continues today in many towns, especially during festivals and celebrations.

Bandas usually have a strong percussion. The percussionists generally provide the accents and do not usually play all the time or keep a 'groove'. Often the percussionists will enter only when the singer is not singing, such as in an instrumental chorus. The groove is mostly provided by the sousaphone (or bass guitar in a few recordings) playing the bass line, and the alto horns playing sharp upbeats. Typically when a banda plays a cumbia, the alto horn players switch to Latin percussion instruments such as timbales, maracas, cowbell, congas, bongos and guiro.

Bandas generally contain between 10 and 20 members. They usually have a lead singer and a second voice, and occasionally a third voice. The voice often consists of a duet, but solo singers and trios are also common.

Besides the typical instrumentation, banda music, as well as many other forms of Regional Mexican music, is also noted for the grito mexicano, a yell that is done at musical interludes within a song, either by the musicians and/or the listening audience.

== Similar genres ==
=== Technobanda ===
In the late 1970s, a new style of Regional Mexican music was developed in the state of Nayarit called Technobanda. Pioneered by bands such as Banda Machos, Banda Maguey, Banda Arkángel R-15, and Banda Pachuco, it is essentially a hybrid of traditional banda with Grupero music. Beginning in the late 1980s, its popularity spread to the rest of Mexico's western states as well as a number of central states, and among the Mexican population in United States from said regions. The 1990s was the peak of Technobanda's popularity. In this subgenre, some or all of the horns are replaced by electric instruments. A typical Technobanda will substitute a sousaphone with an electric bass and the alto horns with an electronic keyboard and an electric guitar. The clarinets are frequently replaced with saxophones, while a drum set replaces the snare drums. The genre popularized the dance style Quebradita. Technobandas had already established vocalists within their repertoire before brass bandas officially added their own vocalists.

=== Tierra Caliente ===
In the late 1980s, another style of Regional Mexican music was developed in the state of Michoacan called Tierra Caliente. Like Technobanda, it includes vocals, electric instruments like a bass guitar and electronic keyboard, as well as instruments such as trumpets, trombones, saxophones and drums. Some bands also use accordions. Tierra Caliente's popularity was originally limited to the regions of Mexico it is named after as well as among the Mexican population living in the United States from said regions, but starting in the mid-2000s, it gained popularity throughout a number of Mexico's central states, as well as in the United States among the Mexican population from said regions.

=== Duranguense ===
Duranguense was created in the early 1990s. It first became prominent in Chicago, Illinois and surged to widespread popularity during the mid to late 2000s among the Mexican and Mexican-American community at large in the United States, as well as in many parts of Mexico. The instrumental line-up includes vocals, saxophones, trombones, keyboards, drums and a tambora. This genre popularized the dance style Pasito Durangense.

The main differences between Technobanda, Tierra Caliente and Duranguense is that the synthesizer riffs are different for all three styles of music, and the fact that Duranguense includes a tambora, while the others do not. Also, Technobanda may include an electric guitar, while the other two traditionally do not, and each subgenre has between one and three vocalists per band. The three subgenres simultaneously produce rancheras, corridos, cumbias, charangas, ballads, boleros, sones, chilenas, polkas and waltzes.

=== Tamborazo ===
Tamborazo is closely related to traditional brass banda. However, Tamborazo uses saxophones instead of clarinets. Another difference from banda is that Tamborazo uses its drum consistently, as opposed to banda which distributes the use of the other instruments throughout a song. Tamborazo originated in Villanueva, in the state of Zacatecas. It is traditionally popular in that state, as well as in the states of Chihuahua, Durango, and San Luis Potosi, and among the Mexican population from said states residing in the United States.

Tamborazo uses various instruments such as:

- Tambora
- Saxophone
- Trumpet
- Snare drum
- Trombone
- Tenor horn
- Sousaphone

Tamborazo bands tend to focus more on instrumental sones, polkas, waltzes, marches, cumbias and mambos.

== See also ==
- Music of Mexico
- Regional Mexican music
- Grammy Award for Best Banda Album
- Latin Grammy Award for Best Banda Album
- Mariachi
- Grupera
- Norteño
- Tejano
- New Mexico music
