= Marco Flores y La Jerez =

Mexican band

Marco Flores y La Jerez, (also known as #1 Banda el Jerez, #1 Banda el Jerez de Marco Flores, Banda Jerez) is a Mexican banda group from Jerez, Zacatecas, Mexico formed in the late 1980s. Among Banda Jerez's many hits include "Billete Verde", "Una Mujer Casada" "Tan Bonita", "Cerveza Helada", "La Cabrona", "La Baraja", "Tamarindo", "Ordeñando la Vaca", "La Bruja" and "La Iguana". The band was named after Jerez de García Salinas, Zacatecas, Mexico, where it was founded. Banda Jerez re-works traditional ranchera songs, from Antonio Aguilar, Vicente Fernández, Heriberto Lazcano and José Alfredo Jiménez. The ensemble of members consist of vocalists Marco Antonio Flores, and Rafael Juárez, and three clarinetists, three trumpeters, three trombonists, two tenor horns, a tambora, a tarola, and a sousaphone player.

== Albums ==
Mujeres y Mentiras was released in August 2007. The album contained the songs including "El Toro Bermejo" and "La Iguana". A second album was released in September 2008. Dicen Que Soy Borracho and contains 13 songs including "El Alegre", "El Negrito No Es Mio", "Te Advierto", "La Virginia", "El Zacatecano" and "Los Bueyes". The third album Me Vale Ver Gatos released in October 2009, contains 12 songs including "Me Vale Ver Gatos Bravos", "La Cumbia de Remo", "El Hombre Que Más Te amo","Pobre del Pobre" and "Que Suene la Banda".

2018 was a busy year for the band, releasing a total of 9 albums : “Corazón Ranchero “ (10 songs), and later that year they released “Corridazos" (10 songs), “El Diablo Mayor” (16 songs), “Enamorado y parrandero” (13 songs), “Me Vale Ver Gatos” (12 songs), “Me Voy A Embriagar (13 songs), “El Perro Negro” (16 songs), “Zapateado Perrón” (17 songs ) and “No Mas Por Ti Me Emborracho” (10 songs).

In 2019 they released “Asi de Facil” which contains 16 songs followed by “Mexicano Hasta La Madre” in 2020. In 2021 “Zapateado Endemoniado” with 20 songs and “Que Toque Mi Banda Jerez (13 songs). 2022 was a year for EPs releasing two 4 song EPs titled “ En Vivo Con la Vallarta Show y Marco Flores “ and “Arrasando “, followed by “La Bruja “ in 2023. That same year, the band also released an album titled “Guitarras” ( 20 songs)

In 2024 Marco Flores y La Jerez, released a new album titled “Ojitos de Amor”.

== Discography ==
- Corazon Ranchero (2004)
- Billete Verde (2005)
- Me Gustan Las Viejas Buenas (2007)
- 20 Tamborazos (2007)
- Mujeres Y Mentiras (2007)
- Dicen Que Soy Borracho (2008)
- Tributo A La Revolucion Mexicana (2009)
- Me Vale Ver Gatos Bravos (2009)
- Enamorado Y Parrandero (2010)
- Corridazos (2010)
- Puro Zacatecas (2011)
- Me Voy A Embriagar (2012)
- De Nueva Cuenta (2012)
- Gracias (2013)
- La Puerta Del Rancho (2013)
- Esta Noche Cena Pancho (2014)
- Soy El Bueno (2014 - released under Remex Music)
- El Diablo Mayor (2018)
- Me Voy A Embriagar (2018)
- El Perro Negro (Album) 16 songs
- Zapateado Perrón (Album) 17 songs
- Nomás Por Ti Me Emborracho (Album) 10 songs
- Asi de Facil (Album) 16 songs
- Mexicano Hasta La Madre (Album)
- 2021 Zapateado Endemoniado (Album) 20 songs
- 2021 Que Toque Mi Banda Jerez (Album) 13 songs
- 2022 En Vivo Con la Vallarta Show y Marco Flores (EP) 4 songs
- 2022 Arrasando (EP) 4 songs
- 2023 La Bruja (EP) 4 songs
- 2023 Guitarras (Album) 20 songs
- 2024 Ojitos de Amor (Album)
