= Conjunto Primavera =

Mexican norteño-sax band

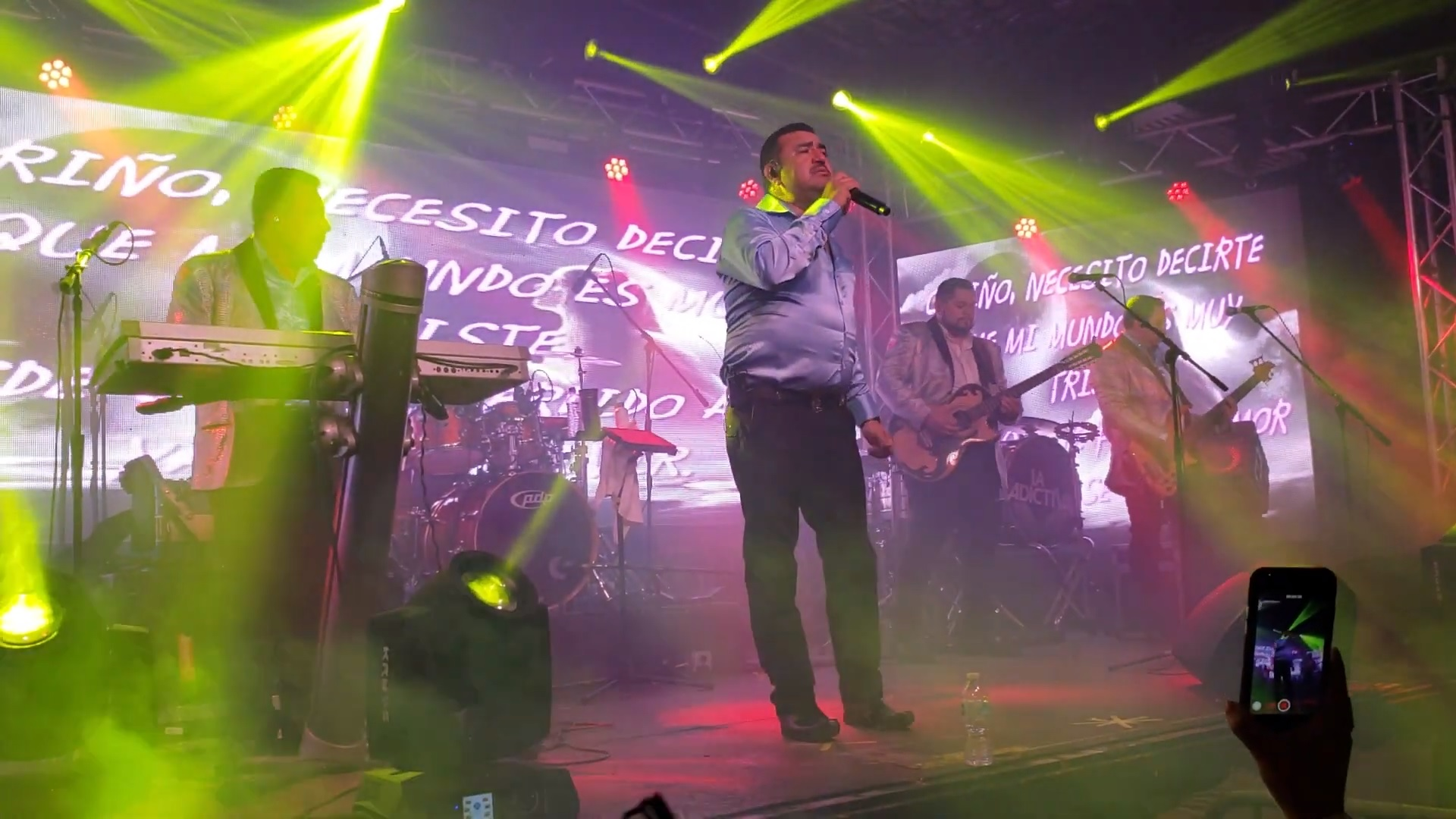
- Conjunto Primavera in 2020

Background information
- Origin: Ojinaga, Chihuahua, Mexico
- Genre: Norteño-sax
- Years active: 1978-present
- Label: Joey Records (1980-1992) AFG Sigma Records (1993-1995) Fonovisa Records (1996-2018) 3MILE Records (2018-2019)
- Members: Juan Dominguez (1978-present); Felix Antonio Contreras (1987-present); Juan Antonio "Tony" Meléndez (1989-present); Adrian Anthony Regalado (2006-present); Saúl González Almanza (2024-present); Manuel Sandoval Jr (2024-Present); Miguel Jimenez Oliva (2024-Present)
- Past members: Ignacio "Nacho" Galindo (1978-1989); Adan Huerta (1978-2000); Daniel Martinez (2001-2006); Oscar Ochoa (1989-2007); Telesforo Saenz (1978-1994); Gustavo Galindo (1978-1983); Ramiro Rodriguez (1978-1986); Jesús "Chuy" Mostrenco (1994); Manuel Rolando Pérez (1995-2023); Sergio "Sheko" Hipólito (2023); Francisco "Frank" Mata (2007-2024)

Conjunto Primavera is a Mexican norteño-sax band from Ojinaga, Chihuahua. In the 1990s and 2000s, they were one of the most popular acts in regional Mexican music.

== History ==
Conjunto Primavera was formed on the first day of spring in 1978 by the saxophonist Juan Dominguez. They remained a local act for several years, but starting in 1980, they signed with an indie label, Joey Records, in San Antonio, Texas. It was at Joey Records that Conjunto Primavera would not only record popular covers such as "La Sirenita", "Paloma Querida", and "Noches Eternas", but also subsequent fan favorites such as "Borracho y Loco", "Cuatro Primaveras", and "10 Kilometros." However, the group was still far from popular.

Starting in the mid-1980s, Conjunto Primavera would start recording romantic ballads with saxophone and electric keyboard, a style that the norteño group would become known for in the years to come. Another major change took place in 1988 when lead singer Nacho Galindo announced he was leaving the group to become a Christian artist. Soon thereafter, Tony Meléndez took the position, at 18 years old, and started to take the group in a new direction.

To further their success, Conjunto Primavera signed a new contract with AFG Sigma Records in 1993 and recorded their first major success, Me Nortie; not long thereafter, AFG was bought out by Mexican label Fonovisa. Since their first release on Fonovisa in 1996, the group has released several gold-selling albums and has been nominated for several Latin Grammy awards.

In 2006, at the 7th Annual Latin Grammy Awards, their song "Aún Sigues Siendo Mía" won the Best Regional Mexican Song award. In 2008, the group received the Billboard Latin Music Lifetime Achievement Award. In 2014, at the 15th Annual Latin Grammy Awards, they won the Best Norteño Album award for their album Amor Amor.

== Members ==
=== Musicians ===
Current members

- Juan Antonio "Tony" Meléndez - lead vocals (1989–present)
- Juan Domínguez - saxophone (1978–present)
- Felix Antonio Contreras - accordion, keyboards (1987–present)
- Adrian Anthony "Adry" Regalado - drums (2006–present)
- Saúl González - bajo sexto (2024–present)
- Manuel Sandoval Jr - bass (2024-Present)
- Miguel Jimenez - percussion (2024-Present)

Former members

- Ignacio "Nacho" Galindo - lead vocals (1978–1989), bass (1983–1989), he would leave the group in 1989 to become a Christian artist
- Adán Huerta - drums (1978–2000)
- Daniel Martínez - drums (2001–2006), left the group shortly after a bus accident in Iraan, Texas, in 2007; has since become the drummer for several Tejano bands such as Los Texmaniacs and Los Palominos
- Óscar Ochoa - bass (1989–2007), left the group for health reasons, and has since formed his own band Conjunto Invernal
- Telésforo Saenz - bajo sexto (1978–1994; died in 2023)
- Gustavo Galindo - bass (1978–1983)
- Ramiro Rodríguez - accordion, keyboards (1978–1986)
- Jesús "Chuy" Monstrenco - bajo sexto (1994; deceased)
- Manuel Rolando Pérez - bajo sexto (1995–2023)
- Sergio "Sheko" Hipólito - bajo sexto (2023)
- Francisco "Frank" Mata - bass (2007–2024)

== Discography ==
=== Studio albums, live albums, and singles ===
- Borracho y Loco (1980) (debut; first album on Joey Records)
- Chihuahua, Mexico (1981)
- De Ojinaga, Chihuahua (1982)
- Almas Perdidas (1983)
- Cuatro Primaveras (1984)
- El Viboron (1985)
- Cumbias y Rancheras (1985)
- La Otra (1986)
- La Cuerda (1987)
- Demasiado Tarde (1988)
- Andos Sin Frenos (1989) (Last Nacho Galindo album)
- Me Voy, Me Voy (1989) (First Tony Melendez album)
- Con Las Manos Vacias (1990)
- Vas a Conseguir (1991)
- Lo Mejor, Lo Ultimo (1991)
- Tu (1992)
- Y Otra Vez (1992) (Last album on Joey Records)
- Me Nortie (1993)(First Album On AFG Sigma Records)
- Amigo Mesero (1994)
- Tragedias del Pueblo (also released under the title "Censurado") (1995) (Last album on AFG Sigma Records)
- Me Nacio del Alma (1996) (First album on Fonovisa) U.S. Billboard Top Latin Albums #35
- Sangre de Valiente (1997)
- De Nuevo A Tu Lado (1997)
- Necesito Decirte (1998) U.S. Latin #13
- En Vivo Para Ti (1999) U.S. Latin #34
- Morir de Amor (2000) U.S. #153, U.S. Latin #1
- Ansia de Amar (2001) U.S. #139, U.S. Latin #1
- En Vivo Para Ti, Vol. 2 (2002) U.S. Latin #28
- Perdoname Mi Amor (2002) U.S. #117, U.S. Latin #2
- Decide Tú (2003) U.S. #124, U.S. Latin #3
- Miles de Voces en Vivo (2004) U.S. Latin #10
- Hoy Como Ayer (2005) U.S. #58, U.S. Latin #2
- Algo de Mi (2006) U.S. #82, U.S. Latin #2
- De Gira Con...Conjunto Primavera (2006) U.S. Latin #69
- De Gira Con...Conjunto Primavera 2 (2006)
- El Amor Que Nunca Fue (2007) U.S. #89, U.S. Latin #4
- Que Ganas de Volver (2008)
- Mentir Por Amor (2009) U.S. #103, U.S. Latin #2
- 30 Aniversario En Vivo (2009) U.S. Latin #18
- Empaca Tus Cosas (2010) U.S. Latin #7
- En Vivo (2010) U.S. Latin
- Al mismo nivel (2012) U.S. Latin
- Amor Amor (2014) U.S. Latin (Winner of the Latin Grammy for Best Norteno Album)
- Un Desengaño (single, duet with Ricky Muñoz from Intocable) (June 16, 2015)
- +Historia (Sept 11, 2015)
- Dejame Llorar (single, duet with Ricardo Montaner) (2016)
- Perdoname (single, 2017)
- Con Toda La Fuerza (2017)
- Cariño A Medias (single, 2019)

=== Compilations ===
- El Recado (2000) U.S. Latin #7
- Recado de Amor (2001) U.S. Latin #32
- Exitos Originales (2001) U.S. Latin #72
- Nuestra Historia (2003) U.S. #159, U.S. Latin #4
- Dejando Huella (2004) U.S. #107, U.S. Latin #1
- Dos Romanticos de Corazon (2004) U.S. Latin #16
- 2 en 1 (2005) U.S. Latin #34
- 20 Llegadores (2005) U.S. Latin #16
- Dejando Huella II (2005) U.S. #158, U.S. Latin #5
- Linea de Oro (2006) U.S. Latin #51
- Para Ti...Nuestra Historia (2006) U.S. #174, U.S. Latin #6
- Chihuahua a Durango (2007) U.S. Latin #45
- Dejando Huella...El Final (2007) U.S. Latin #20
- La Mejor...Collecion: 30 Super Exitos (2007) U.S. Latin #68
- 20 Super Temas: La Historia De Los Exitos (2009) U.S. Latin #15
- Serie Diamante: 30 Super Exitos (2009) U.S. Latin #43
- 20 Kilates Romanticos (2015) U.S. Latin
