= Jarana yucateca =

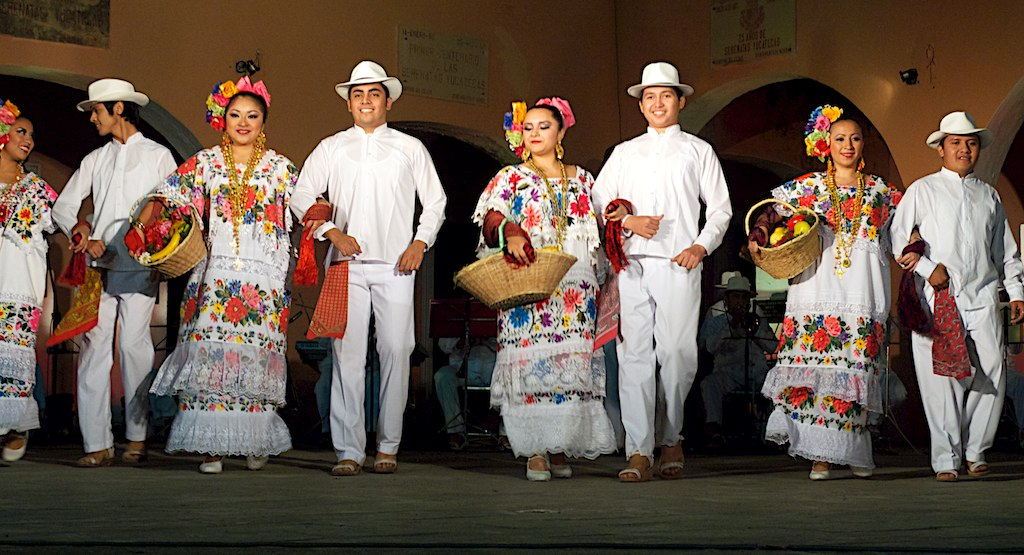
La jarana de Yucatán

The jarana yucateca is the typical dance and musical form of the Yucatán Peninsula. There are two possible meters: "seis por ocho" (in musical counts of 6/8) and "tres por cuatro" (in musical counts of 3/4). The jarana dance is done in pairs; the footwork is the same for women and men.

The music of the jarana is performed by a wind band ensemble.

== The Jarana Dance is Performed in Mérida, Valladolid and Elsewhere Throughout the State of Yucatán ==
Jarana performers can be seen performing in Parque Francisco Cantón Rosado in Valladolid, Yucatán, Mexico quite often. Jarana is the name of the dance originally performed during "" celebration but is seen performed throughout the year in various central parks or zócalos throughout the Yucatán including Mérida, Yucatán's capital.

== A Fusion of Spanish and Maya Culture and Music ==
The vaquería occurred when the Spanish conquistador cattle farmers called upon the local Maya to count and brand the cattle on the hacienda. The Spanish allowed the Yucatecas to celebrate for all the hard work that was required and joined in on the vaquería celebration.

== Jarana Performers Dance with Bottles on Their Head ==
Dancers will skillfully place bottles on their head during la jarana. The idea is to not let the bottle fall or have any liquid come out. Today, during most shows, these beer bottles are filled with water.

== The Vaqueras and Vaqueros Wear Beautiful, Traditional Maya Outfits While Performing La Jarana ==
Both women and men are dressed in traditional Maya wear for the jarana dance. The women wear what's called a terno and it consists of 3 parts called a jubón, a hipil and a fustán. The men, on the other hand dress all in white with a typical guayabera shirt, hat and a handkerchief that falls to the knee called a paliacate. They also wear traditional leather sandals or "chanclas" called "chillonas" for the squealing sound the thick heal makes.

== Gallery ==
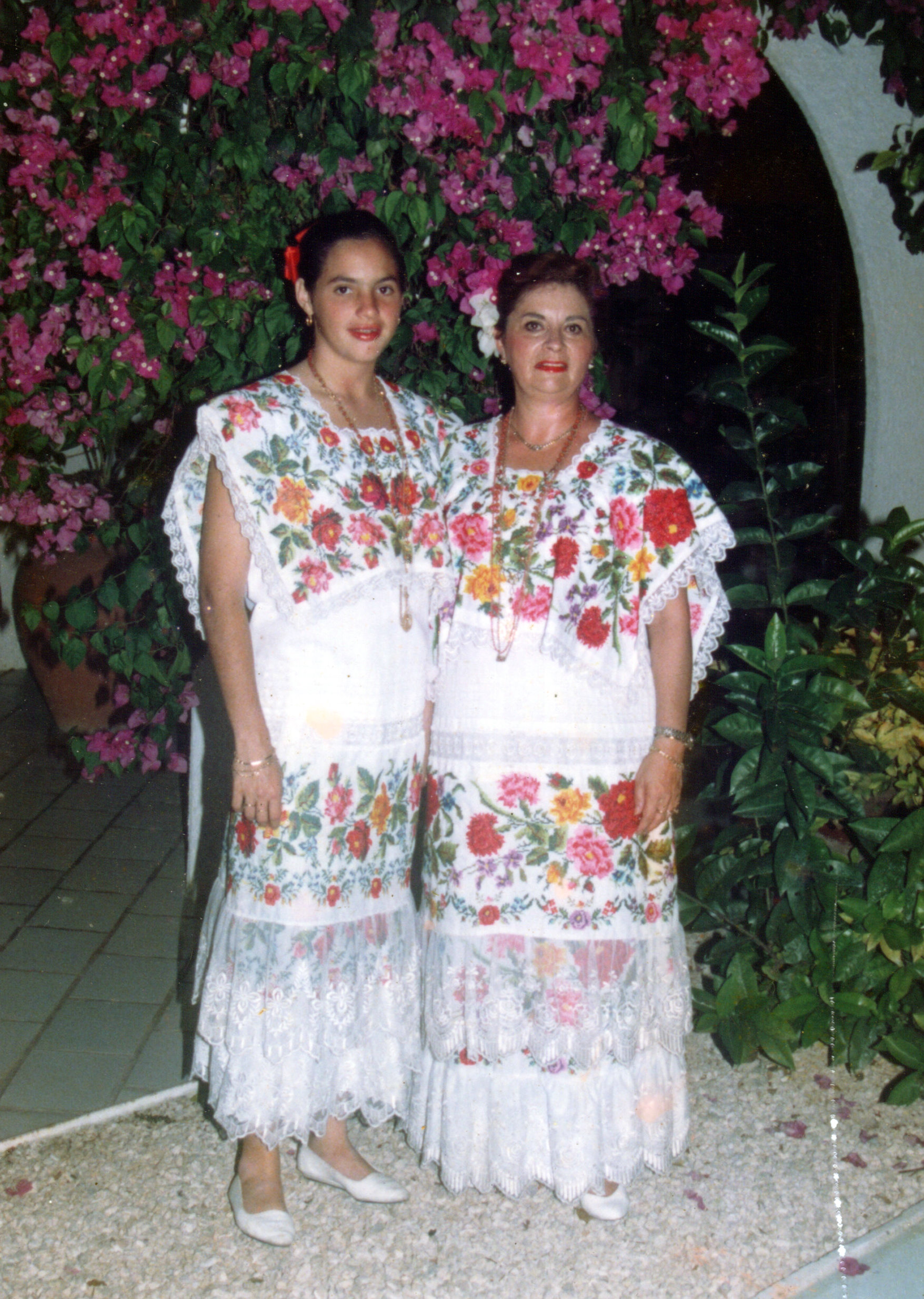
Yucatecas ataviadas con el traje regional de Yucatán.

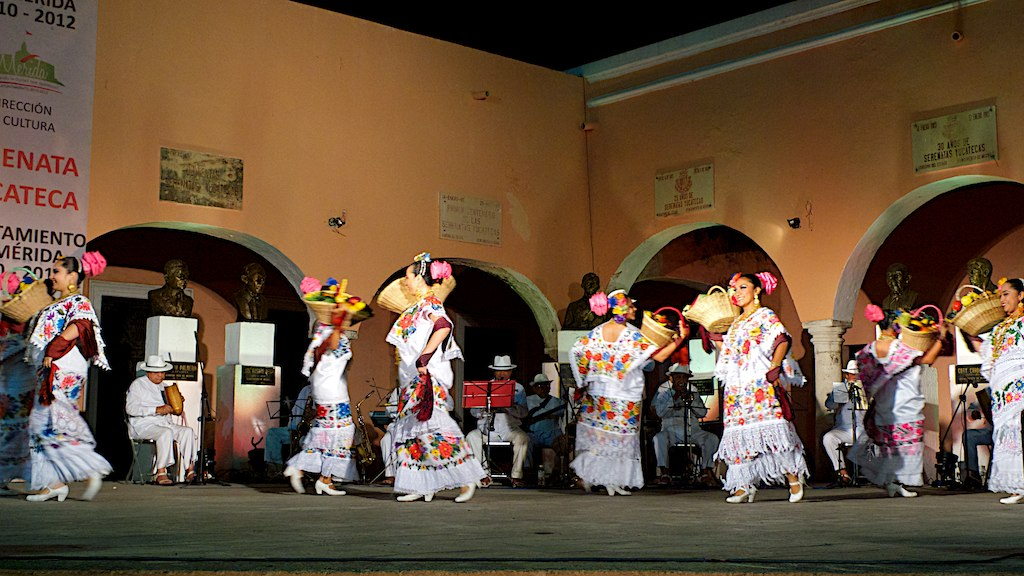
Conjunto jaranero del Ayuntamiento de Mérida bailando jaranas en la Plaza de Santa Lucía en Mérida.
