= Tierra Caliente music =

Genre of Regional Mexican music

- Native name: Música de Tierra Caliente
- Stylistic origins: Technobanda
- Cultural origins: Late 20th century, Tierra Caliente
- Typical instruments: Vocals, electronic keyboards, electric bass, trumpets, trombones, saxophones, accordion, drums, electronic percussion pad

Local scenes
- Mexico, United States, Northern Triangle of Central America

Tierra Caliente music (música de Tierra Caliente in Spanish) is a subgenre of regional Mexican music.

== History ==
Tierra Caliente music originated in the late 20th century in Mexico's Tierra Caliente region. The genre was influenced by the technobanda sound; essentially using the same instruments such as vocals, electric keyboards, electric bass, trumpets, trombones, saxophones and drums. Some bands also utilize accordions. Tierra Caliente emphasizes the electric keyboard, giving the genre its own signature keyboard riff. The genre's popularity was originally limited to the region in Mexico it is named after, as well as among the Mexican population from said region living in the United States, but starting in the mid-2000s, its popularity spread to other parts of Mexico; mainly in the country's Bajío region, as well as the Mexican community from said region residing in the United States. It also gained some popularity in the Northern Triangle of Central America.

== Artists ==
Some of the most famous Tierra Caliente artists are; La Dinastía de Tuzantla, Beto y sus Canarios, Tierra Cali, Los Pajaritos de Tacupa, Gerardo Díaz y su Gerarquía, Triny y La Leyenda, Josecito León y su Internacional Banda Roja, El Cejas y su Banda Fuego, Los Players de Tuzantla, Arkángel Musical, El Trono de México, Banda Los Costeños, among others.

== Repertoire ==
Styles of songs performed in Tierra Caliente music include rancheras, corridos, cumbias, charangas, ballads, boleros, sones, chilenas, polkas and waltzes.
