= Charanga-vallenata =

Style of Latin music

Charanga-vallenata is a style of Latin music that combines conjunto, charanga and vallenato-style accordion. It is essentially Cumbia performed at double its normal speed. It could also be interpreted as Mambo with lyrics. It became popular in the 1970s, when it was associated with Roberto Torres.

== See also ==
- List of best-selling Latin albums
- List of best-selling Latin music artists
