= Norteño-sax =

Subgenre of regional Mexican music

- Other names: Norteño with sax
- Cultural origins: Mid-20th century, Northeastern Mexico
- Typical instruments: Vocals, alto saxophone, button accordion, bajo sexto, bajo quinto, electric bass, electronic keyboard, drum kit, congas, güiro, cowbell, electronic percussion pad, tololoche, snare drum

Local scenes
- Mexico, United States

Norteño-sax or norteño with sax is a subgenre of Regional Mexican music. It incorporates the use of the alto saxophone as the main instrument, as well as traditional instruments such as vocals, button accordion, bajo sexto, electric bass, and drums.

== History ==
Norteño with sax originated in Monterrey, Nuevo León, Mexico, in the 1940s. Over the years, its popularity had spread to several other regions of Mexico; mainly in the country's landlocked states. It would also gain popularity among the Mexican-American community in the United States from said region.

Even though norteño-sax had its origins in Nuevo León, as did traditional accordion-led norteño, the former eventually became more culturally associated with states such as Chihuahua, Coahuila, Durango, Zacatecas, and San Luis Potosí; in part due to it being more popular there than its native region.

The term "norteño-sax" or "norteño with sax" did not become widely used until the 2010s. Prior to that, it was known simply as "norteño" music. The genre eventually received its own name in order for it to be distinguishable from other styles of norteño music.

More recent norteño-sax artists have incorporated modern elements into their music in terms of instruments and lyrics without abandoning their traditional roots.

== Artists ==
Some famous norteño-sax acts include Eulalio González "El Piporro", Lorenzo de Monteclaro, Conjunto Primavera, Los Rieleros del Norte, Polo Urías y su Máquina Norteña, Kikín y Los Astros, La Maquinaria Norteña, La Fiera de Ojinaga, La Energía Norteña, Los Pescadores del Río Conchos, La Zenda Norteña, Los Primos del Este, among others.

== Repertoire ==
Styles of songs performed in norteño-sax include rancheras, corridos, cumbias, boleros, huapangos, ballads, charangas, polkas, waltzes, chotís, mazurkas, and redowas.
