= Regional Mexican music =

Genre of music

- Other names: Música Mexicana, Mexican Regional
- Stylistic origins: Polka; waltz; ranchera; corrido; Mexican son; huapango; Indigenous music of Mexico
- Cultural origins: Mexico and Southwestern U.S.

Subgenres
- (See list)

Other topics
- Latin music, country music, sertanejo music

Regional Mexican music, also known as Música Mexicana, is an umbrella term encompassing the regional subgenres of Mexico's folk music and its derivatives from the Southwestern United States. It is characterized by its stylistic diversity, with each subgenre representing and originating from a specific region of Mexico. Its roots date back to the 16th–19th centuries, emerging from a fusion of Indigenous, Spanish, African and other European instruments and musical traditions.

Major subgenres include mariachi, banda, norteño, corridos, tejano, duranguense, and sierreño. Mariachi, which originated in 18th-century Jalisco, achieved international recognition during the Golden Age of Mexican Cinema through figures such as Pedro Infante and Vicente Fernández. The 1990s saw the rise of technobanda, grupero and the so-called "Golden Age of Tejano", led by Selena. In the 2000s, duranguense gained prominence. The 2010s were dominated by Sinaloan banda music led by Banda MS. The 2020s were defined by the presence of corridos tumbados, a contemporary fusion incorporating elements of trap and hip-hop, and an unprecedented global growth of regional Mexican music popularity driven by recording artists such as Peso Pluma, Natanael Cano, Grupo Frontera, and Carín León.

Within the music industry of the United States, regional Mexican music became a dominant format on Spanish-language radio, resonating strongly with the Mexican-American population. This expansion has been marked by record-breaking streaming figures and chart success on platforms such as Billboard, where the genre has regularly placed songs on the Billboard Hot 100 chart.

== History ==
=== 16th–20th century: Origins ===
Many different subgenres of regional Mexican have their origins in the 16th to 19th centuries. Indigenous, African and Spanish instruments and styles mixed together to create these genres of music. For example, mariachi originated in the state of Jalisco around the 18th century. The mariachi genre is distinguished by its use of the vihuela, guitarrón, trumpet, and violin.

Other genres developed later in the 20th century. An example being the ranchera. Ranchera is a traditional style of regional Mexican formed during the Mexican Revolution. Today, it can be performed in the vast majority of regional Mexican subgenres in several different time signatures.

=== 1940s–1960s: Rise of mariachi ===
The popularity of regional Mexican music, increased internationally from the 1940s to 1960s with the addition of the many regional Mexican soundtracks used in films. Pedro Infante was one of many who helped popularize the genre in the 1950s during the Golden Age of Mexican Cinema. Regional Mexican boleros, specifically boleros accompanied with mariachi, were also popular around this time. Beginning in the 1940s, regional Mexican music gained popularity in Chile through the use of radio and television.

=== 1970s–1980s: Popularity of mariachi ===
In the 1970s, the mariachi genre and ranchera style began to increasingly spread into the United States. Many popular mariachi singers during this time include Vicente Fernández and Antonio Aguilar.

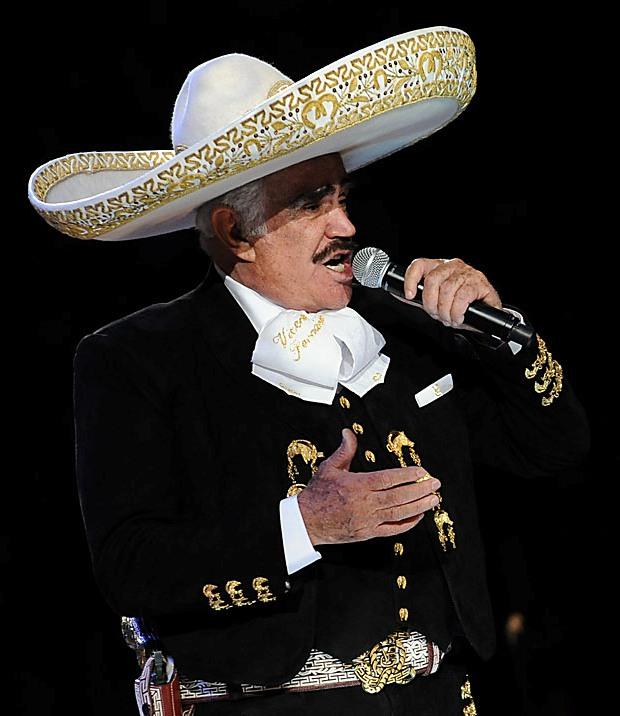
Mariachi singer Vicente Fernández performing in 2013 at one of his last live concerts.

In the 1980s, Mexican singer-songwriter Juan Gabriel popularized the mariachi ballad along with Angélica María. Musical groups like Ramón Ayala y Los Bravos del Norte, Los Cadetes de Linares, and Los Invasores de Nuevo León from the northeastern states of Mexico helped expand the popularity of norteño music. During the 1980s, the different but similar genres of music were grouped under the term "regional Mexican" and grew in popularity in the United States, due to higher concentrations of Mexican population. In 1984, Billboard released a Regional Mexican Albums chart in their magazine. Vicente Fernández's album Por Tu Maldito Amor (1989) became the longest running number one regional Mexican album of the decade in the United States.

=== 1990s: Rise of several subgenres ===
In the 1990s, various subgenres of regional Mexican music remained popular and gained popularity all over Mexico and the United States. The grupero genre became one of the most popular regional Mexican genres in the United States due to its unique use of electric guitars, keyboard, and drums. Popular bands in the genre included Los Bukis, Los Temerarios, and Bronco. Other regional Mexican acts like American singer Selena were known for fusing the style with Tejano music. Tejano music soon became the most prominent in the genre and one of the fastest-growing music genres in the United States. The "Golden Age of Tejano" is considered to have ended March 31, 1995, when Selena was shot and killed. Selena's music led to the genre's revival and made it marketable in the U.S. for the first time.

In 1992, Chalino Sanchez, a Mexican singer who influenced the narcocorrido genre was murdered outside a nightclub. In 1994 in the U.S., the Billboard chart for Regional Mexican music was created and mostly included technocumbias and grupero ballads. "La Niña Fresa" by Banda Zeta was the first number-one song included on the chart. The decade also saw the rise in popularity of Sinaloan banda with groups such as Banda El Recodo, La Arrolladora Banda El Limón, and Banda Los Recoditos. Technobanda, a hybrid of Sinaloan banda and grupero which was developed in the late 1970s in the Mexican state of Nayarit, had its heyday with acts such as Banda Machos, Banda Maguey, and Banda Arkángel R-15. Bands such as Conjunto Primavera, Los Rieleros del Norte, and Polo Urías y su Máquina Norteña helped spread the popularity of the norteño with sax sound. A country en Español popularity boom, led by the band Caballo Dorado, reached northern and central Mexico during the 1990s.

In the late 1990s, Mexican singer Alejandro Fernández was known for mixing elements of pop music and mariachi in his Mexican pop songs. In 1999, Nortec was developed from Norteño and Techno in the Mexican city of Tijuana.

=== 2000s: Duranguense and Tierra Caliente sounds ===
In the 2000s, established regional Mexican artists continued to release music including California-based norteño band Los Tigres de Norte, a band that has released music since the 1970s. That same decade, some new regional Mexican groups were formed, including Sinaloan banda group Banda MS. Valentín Elizalde, a regional Mexican artist who made corridos, was shot and killed after a performance in Mexico in 2006.

In the mid to late 2000s, duranguense was one of the most prevalent genres. Duranguense was further evolved with its own "Chicago sound" as Mexican American artists from the area incorporated different rhythms and styles into the genre. Duranguense bands include Grupo Montéz de Durango, K-Paz de la Sierra, and Patrulla 81. The decade also saw some mainstream exposure for Tierra Caliente music with acts such as La Dinastía de Tuzantla, Beto y sus Canarios, and Tierra Cali.

=== 2010s: Heavy Sinaloan influence ===
In the 2010s, regional Mexican music continued to be pioneered. Sinaloan banda music had its biggest decade to date with acts such as Banda MS and Julión Álvarez leading the way. Artists emphasizing romantic ballads helped the genre gain mainstream popularity. Norteño-Banda, also known as norteño with tuba, had its most successful run during the early to mid 2010s with artists such as Larry Hernández, Gerardo Ortíz, Calibre 50, and Voz de Mando. Mexican singer-songwriter Ariel Camacho led the sierreño style with Los Plebes del Rancho. Camacho would go on to inspire many other later regional Mexican artists before and after his death in 2015.

In 2017, Mexican singer Christian Nodal charted on the Regional Mexican and Latin Billboard charts in the United States with his single "Adiós Amor". Nodal is known for his fusion of mariachi and norteño music. In 2019, norteño band Los Tucanes de Tijuana became Coachella's first norteño act. Another norteño band, Los Tigres de Norte broke the record of paid attendance for a Rodeo Houston show on March 10, 2019, with 75,586 concert tickets sold.

=== 2020s: Global resurgence ===
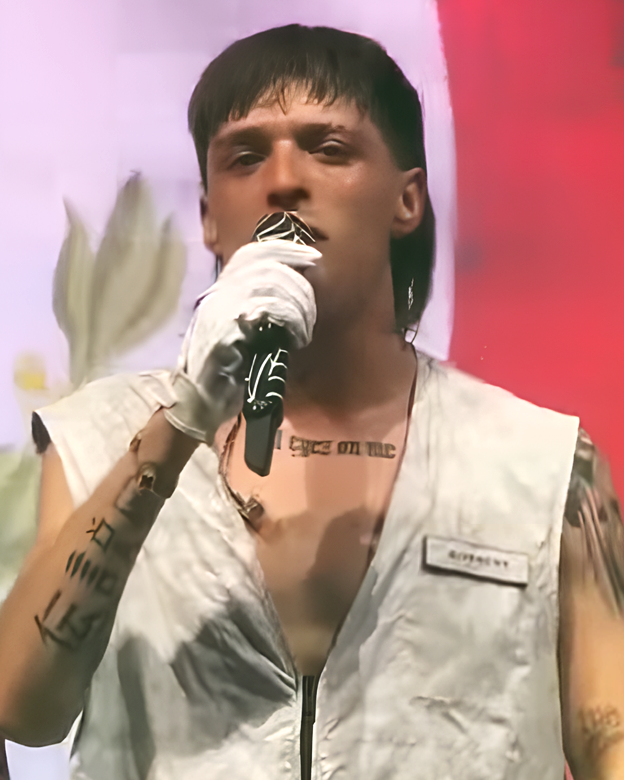
Peso Pluma at a concert in 2023.

In the early 2020s, the regional Mexican genre had a global resurgence steadily topping charts and becoming more listened to. According to Spotify in 2022, Mexican music streams more than doubled since 2019 to reach 5.6 billion. The format had 150 U.S. radio stations. Some of the most listened to regional Mexican artists in the 2020s include Peso Pluma, Natanael Cano, Junior H, Grupo Frontera, Banda MS, Iván Cornejo, and Grupo Firme. Many regional Mexican artists reached millions of streams and high chart success including Peso Pluma whose song with Eslabon Armando titled "Ella Baila Sola" reached No. 4 on the U.S.'s Billboard's mainstream pop chart, the Hot 100. In 2023, Peso Pluma had 24 songs enter the Hot 100. Popular genres of these new artists include corridos tumbados, or trap corridos. In 2022, Yahritza Martinez of Yahritza y su Esencia, became the youngest Latin artist to enter the Hot 100 at the age of 15. In 2023, artists of other Latin music genres including Bad Bunny, Becky G, and Shakira released songs and albums with regional Mexican music.

In February 2024, Carín León, who is known to incorporate country music influence into several of his songs, became the first regional Mexican artist to perform in one of country music's most prestigious venues, the Grand Ole Opry. Later, in April of that year, he became the first regional Mexican artist to perform in both the Coachella and Stagecoach music festivals within the same year. In June 2026, he became the first regional Mexican artist to headline a concert at Summerfest in Milwaukee, Wisconsin. Later, in August of that year, he became the first Mexican artist to headline the Summer Sonic Festival in Japan. Then, in September of that year, he became the first Latin artist to perform at the Sphere in Las Vegas, where he held a series of residency concerts.

== Mass media ==
Uforia Audio Network owns a number of stations running the regional Mexican format. Television channels Bandamax and Video Rola (usually abbreviated as VR) are dedicated to transmitting programming relating mainly to the regional Mexican genre. In Mexico, there are many radio stations solely dedicated to regional Mexican music and some with certain subgenres. Regional Mexican stations are available in the U.S. mostly targeting the Mexican-American population.

== Subgenres ==
Brass banda; Banda oaxaqueña; Banda sinaloense; Canto cardenche; Conjunto; Conjunto calentano; Conjunto de arpa grande; Conjunto huasteco; Conjunto jarocho; Country en español; Duranguense; Grupero; Huichol; Jarana yucateca; Mariachi; Mariachi-pop; Marimba chiapaneca	New Mexico music; Norteño; Norteño regiomontano; Norteño sinaloense; Norteño with sax; Norteño with tuba; Tumbado/Urban norteño; Sierreño; Sierreño guerrerense; Sierreño sinaloense; Sierreño with accordion; Sierreño with tuba; Sad sierreño; Pop-rock sierreño; Tumbado/Urban sierreño; Tamborazo zacatecano; Tamborileros tabasqueños; Technobanda; Tejano/Tex-Mex; Conjunto tejano; Orquesta tejana; Tejano moderno; Tierra Caliente; Within their respective genres, regional Mexican artists perform different styles of songs such as rancheras, corridos, cumbias, boleros, ballads, among others.

== See also ==
- Grammy Award for Best Música Mexicana Album (including Tejano)
- Latin Grammy Award for Best Regional Mexican Song
- Mexican music in Chile
- Monitor Latino, a music chart which provides regional Mexican music charts for Mexico, the United States and Guatemala
- Billboard regional Mexican charts, music charts by Billboard
