= Lo Nuestro Award for Banda Artist of the Year =

Latin music award

Lo Nuestro Awards for Banda Artist of the Year
- Current: Premio Lo Nuestro 2017
- Awarded for: Banda Artist of the Year
- Country: United States
- Presented by: Univision
- First award: 2001
- Currently held by: Julión Álvarez (2017)

Highlights
- Most awards: Banda el Recodo (6)
- Most nominations: Banda el Recodo (10)
- Website: univision.com/premiolonuestro

The Lo Nuestro Award for Banda Artist of the Year is an award presented annually by American network Univision. It was first awarded in 2001 and has been given annually since. The accolade was established to recognize the most talented performers of Latin music. The nominees and winners were originally selected by a voting poll conducted among program directors of Spanish-language radio stations in the United States and also based on chart performance on Billboard Latin music charts, with the results being tabulated and certified by the accounting firm Deloitte. At the present time, the winners are selected by the audience through an online survey. The trophy awarded is shaped in the form of a treble clef.

The award was first presented to Mexican band Banda el Recodo in 2001, they also hold the most wins and most nominations with 6 out of ten nominations. As of 2019, Mexican-American singer Jenni Rivera is the first and only female artist to have won the award, with her win in 2009.

== Winners and nominees ==
Listed below are the winners of the award for each year, as well as the other nominees for the majority of the years awarded.

Key	Meaning
‡	Indicates the winner

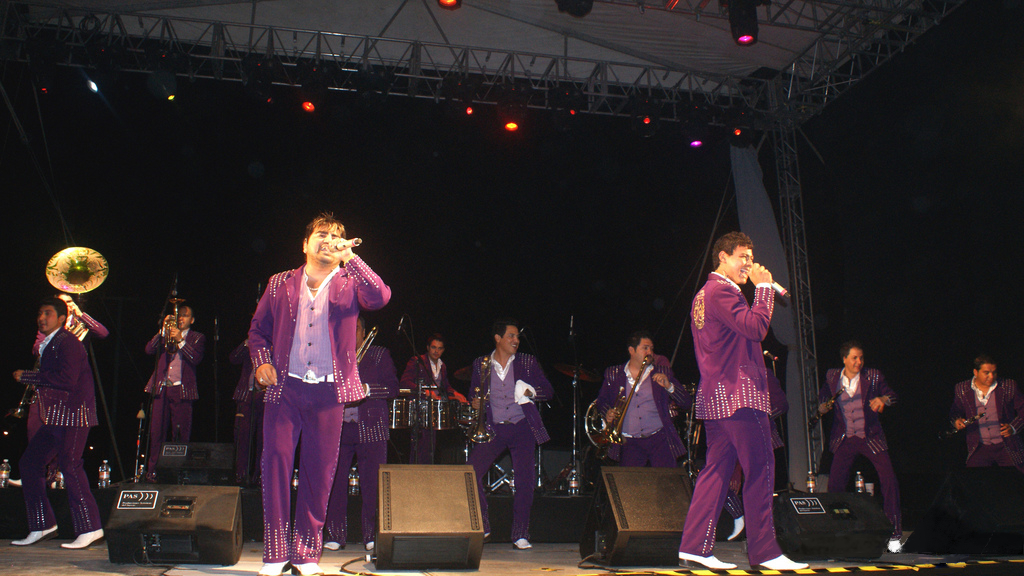
Mexican band Banda el Recodo (pictured in 2009), winner in 2001, 2002, 2003, 2005, 2006, and 2013

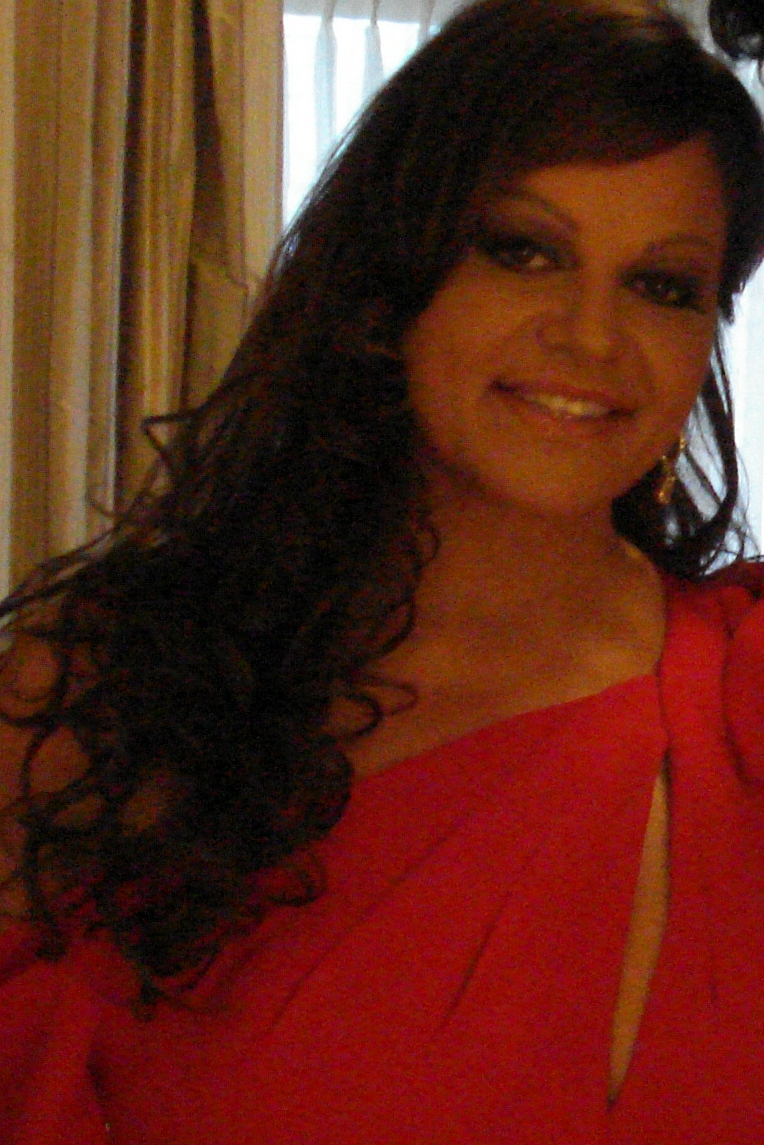
Mexican-American singer Jenni Rivera (pictured in 2008), the only female singer to have won the award

Year	Performer	Ref
2001 (13th)	Banda el Recodo‡	
2001 (13th)	Banda Arkángel R-15	
2001 (13th)	Banda Cuisillos	
2001 (13th)	Banda Machos	
2002 (14th)	Banda el Recodo‡	
2002 (14th)	Banda Cuisillos	
2002 (14th)	Banda Machos	
2002 (14th)	Lupillo Rivera	
2003 (15th)	Banda el Recodo‡	
2003 (15th)	El Coyote and su Banda Tierra Santa	
2003 (15th)	Germán Lizárraga and su Banda Estrellas de Sinaloa	
2003 (15th)	Lupillo Rivera	
2003 (15th)	Rogelio Martínez	
2004 (16th)	Joan Sebastian‡	
2004 (16th)	Vicente Fernández	
2004 (16th)	Banda el Recodo	
2004 (16th)	El Coyote y Su Banda Tierra Santa	
2004 (16th)	Montez de Durango	
2005 (17th)	Banda el Recodo‡	
2005 (17th)	Cuisillos	
2005 (17th)	Los Horóscopos de Durango	
2005 (17th)	Montez de Durango	
2006 (18th)	Banda el Recodo‡	
2006 (18th)	Beto y sus Canarios	
2006 (18th)	K-Paz de la Sierra	
2006 (18th)	Patrulla 81	
2007 (19th)	Joan Sebastian‡	
2007 (19th)	Mariano Barba	
2007 (19th)	Beto y sus Canarios	
2007 (19th)	Jenni Rivera	
2008 (20th)	Joan Sebastian‡	
2008 (20th)	Cuisillos	
2008 (20th)	El Chapo de Sinaloa	
2008 (20th)	La Arrolladora Banda El Limón	
2009 (21st)	Jenni Rivera‡	
2009 (21st)	El Chapo de Sinaloa	
2009 (21st)	El Potro de Sinaloa	
2009 (21st)	La Arrolladora Banda El Limón	
2009 (21st)	Los Dareyes de la Sierra	
2010 (22nd)	Espinoza Paz‡	
2010 (22nd)	Banda el Recodo	
2010 (22nd)	Dareyes de la Sierra	
2010 (22nd)	El Chapo de Sinaloa	
2010 (22nd)	La Arrolladora Banda El Limón	
2011 (23rd)	Espinoza Paz‡	
2011 (23rd)	La Original Banda El Limón	
2011 (23rd)	Banda el Recodo	
2011 (23rd)	La Arrolladora Banda El Limón	
2012 (24th)	Larry Hernandez‡	
2012 (24th)	Julión Alvarez	
2012 (24th)	La Arrolladora Banda El Limón	
2012 (24th)	La Original Banda El Limón de Salvador Lizárraga	
2013 (25th)	Banda el Recodo‡	
2013 (25th)	La Addictiva Banda San José de Mesillas	
2013 (25th)	La Arrolladora Banda El Limón	
2013 (25th)	La Original Banda El Limón de Salvador Lizárraga	
2014 (26th)	Roberto Tapia‡	
2014 (26th)	Banda El Recodo	
2014 (26th)	La Arrolladora Banda El Limón	
2014 (26th)	La Original Banda El Limón de Salvador Lizárraga	
2015 (27th)	La Arrolladora Banda El Limón‡	
2015 (27th)	Banda Carnaval	
2015 (27th)	Banda Los Recoditos	
2015 (27th)	Banda Sinaloense MS de Sergio Lizárraga	
2017 (29th)	Julión Álvarez	
2017 (29th)	La Séptima Banda	
2017 (29th)	La Arrolladora Banda El Limón	
2017 (29th)	Banda Sinaloense MS de Sergio Lizarraga	

== Multiple wins and nominations ==
Number	Performer(s)
Wins
6	Banda el Recodo
3	Joan Sebastian
2	Espinoza Paz
Nominations
10	Banda el Recodo
7	La Arrolladora Banda El Limón
4	Cuisillos
4	La Original Banda El Limón
3	El Chapo de Sinaloa
3	Joan Sebastian
3	El Chapo de Sinaloa
3	Joan Sebastian
2	Banda Machos
2	Beto y sus Canarios
2	El Chapo de Sinaloa
2	El Coyote y su Banda Tierra Santa
2	Espinoza Paz
2	Los Dareyes de la Sierra
2	Montez de Durango
2	Jenni Rivera
2	Lupillo Rivera
2	Julión Álvarez

== See also ==
- Grammy Award for Best Banda Album
- Latin Grammy Award for Best Banda Album
