= Lo Nuestro Award for Regional Mexican Song of the Year =

Latin music award

Lo Nuestro Awards for Regional Mexican Song of the Year
- Current: Premio Lo Nuestro 2015
- Awarded for: Regional Mexican Song of the Year
- Country: United States
- Presented by: Univision
- First award: 1989
- Currently held by: Gerardo Ortíz (2015)

Highlights
- Most awards: Gerardo Ortíz (3)
- Most nominations: Vicente Fernández (10)
- Website: univision.com/premiolonuestro

The Lo Nuestro Award for Regional Mexican Song of the Year is an honor presented annually by American television network Univision at the Lo Nuestro Awards. The accolade was established to recognize the most talented performers of Latin music. The nominees and winners were originally selected by a voting poll conducted among program directors of Spanish-language radio stations in the United States and also based on chart performance on Billboard Latin music charts, with the results being tabulated and certified by the accounting firm Deloitte. However, since 2004, the winners are selected through an online survey. The trophy awarded is shaped in the form of a treble clef.

The award was first presented to "Y Ahora Te Vas" by Mexican band Los Bukis. Mexican performer Gerardo Ortíz holds the record for the most awards, winning on three occasions. Fellow Mexican band Los Yonics is the most nominated act without a win, with four unsuccessful nominations.

== Winners and nominees ==
Listed below are the winners of the award for each year, as well as the other nominees for the majority of the years awarded.

Key	Meaning
‡	Indicates the winning song

Year	Song	Performer(s)	Ref
1989 (1st)	"Y Ahora Te Vas"‡	Los Bukis	
1989 (1st)	"Dos Corazones"	Vicente Fernández and Vikki Carr	
1989 (1st)	"Tus Mentiras"	Los Bukis	
1989 (1st)	"Entre Mas Lejos Me Vaya"	Los Caminantes	
1989 (1st)	"Tu Presa Fácil"	Los Yonics	
1990 (2nd)	"Por Tu Maldito Amor"‡	Vicente Fernández	
1990 (2nd)	"Válgame Dios"	Yolanda del Río	
1990 (2nd)	"Mujeres Divinas"	Vicente Fernández	
1990 (2nd)	"Frente a Frente"	Los Yonics	
1990 (2nd)	"Perdón Por Tus Lágrimas"	Los Yonics	
1991 (3rd)	"Corazón Duro"‡	Grupo Bronco	
1991 (3rd)	"Amor de los Dos"	Chayanne	
1991 (3rd)	"Sólo los Tontos"	Vicente Fernández and Alejandro Fernández	
1991 (3rd)	"Sólo Te Quiero a Ti"	Los Temerarios	
1991 (3rd)	"Déjame en Paz"	Angeles Ochoa	
1992 (4th)	"Como Me Duele Amor"‡	La Mafia	
1992 (4th)	"Déjame Amarte Otra Vez"	Grupo Bronco	
1992 (4th)	"Si Te Vuelves a Enamorar"	Grupo Bronco	
1992 (4th)	"Dos Cartas y Una Flor"	Los Caminantes	
1992 (4th)	"Que Sepan Todos"	Vicente Fernández	
1993 (5th)	"Como La Flor"‡	Selena	
1993 (5th)	"Adoro"	Grupo Bronco	
1993 (5th)	"Estás Tocando Fuego"	La Mafia	
1993 (5th)	"Mi Vida Eres Tú"	Los Temerarios	
1993 (5th)	"Pero Te Vas a Arrepentir"	Los Yonics	
1994 (6th)	"Me Estoy Enamorando"‡	La Mafia	
1994 (6th)	"Dos Mujeres, Un Camino"	Grupo Bronco	
1994 (6th)	"Morenita"	Los Bukis	
1994 (6th)	"Lástima Que Seas Ajena"	Vicente Fernández	
1994 (6th)	"No Debes Jugar"	Selena	
1995 (7th)	"Amor Prohibido"‡	Selena	
1995 (7th)	"La Niña Fresa"	Banda Zeta	
1995 (7th)	"Ese Loco Soy Yo"	Liberación	
1995 (7th)	"La Loca"	Los Fugitivos	
1995 (7th)	"Tu Ingratitud"	Marco Antonio Solís and Los Bukis	
1996 (8th)	"Como Te Extraño"‡	Pete Astudillo	
1996 (8th)	"Canción 187"	Juan Gabriel	
1996 (8th)	"Golpes en El Corazón"	Los Tigres del Norte	
1996 (8th)	"Será Mejor Que Te Vayas"	Marco Antonio Solís and Los Bukis	
1996 (8th)	"Enamorado de Un Fantasma"	Liberación	
1997 (9th)	"Piensa en Mi"‡	Grupo Mojado	
1997 (9th)	"El Principe"	Grupo Límite	
1997 (9th)	"Un Millón de Rosas"	La Mafia	
1997 (9th)	"Que Pena Me Das"	Marco Antonio Solís	
1997 (9th)	"El Circo"	Los Tigres del Norte	
1998 (10th)	"La Venia Bendita"‡	Marco Antonio Solís	
1998 (10th)	"Es La Mujer"	Alejandro Fernández	
1998 (10th)	Nos Estorbó la Ropa"	Vicente Fernández	
1998 (10th)	"Hasta Mañana"	Grupo Límite	
1998 (10th)	"Ya Me Voy Para Siempre"	Los Temerarios	
1999 (11th)	"Por Mujeres Como Tú"‡	Pepe Aguilar	
1999 (11th)	"Voy a Pintar Mi Raya"	Banda Arkangel R-15	
1999 (11th)	"Dos Hojas sin Rumbo"	Julio Preciado	
1999 (11th)	"Me Voy a Quitar de En Medio"	Vicente Fernández	
1999 (11th)	"Eres Mi Droga"	Intocable	
1999 (11th)	"Botella Envenenada"	Los Temerarios	
2000 (12th)	"Necesito Decirte"‡	Conjunto Primavera	
2000 (12th)	"El Disgusto"	Julio Preciado	
2000 (12th)	"El Listón de Tu Pelo"	Los Angeles Azules	
2000 (12th)	"Perdóname"	Pepe Aguilar	
2000 (12th)	"Me Estoy Acostumbrando a Ti"	Pepe Aguilar	
2000 (12th)	"Amor Platónico"	Los Tucanes de Tijuana	
2001 (13th)	"Secreto de Amor"‡	Joan Sebastian	
2001 (13th)	"Por Una Mujer Bonita"	Pepe Aguilar	
2001 (13th)	"Yo Sé Que Te Acordarás"	Banda el Recodo	
2001 (13th)	"Como este Loco"	Julio Preciado	
2001 (13th)	"A Ella"	El Poder del Norte	
2001 (13th)	"Para Poder Llegar a Ti"	Julio Preciado	
2001 (13th)	"De Paisano a Paisano"	Los Tigres del Norte	
2002 (14th)	"No Me Conoces Aún"‡	Palomo	
2002 (14th)	"Me Vas a Extrañar"	Pepe Aguilar	
2002 (14th)	"El Ayudante"	Vicente Fernández	
2002 (14th)	"Despreciado"	Lupillo Rivera	
2002 (14th)	"Esa Pared"	Julio Preciado	
2002 (14th)	"El Amor Soñado"	Los Tucanes de Tijuana	
2003 (15th)	"Quitame Ese Hombre"‡	Pilar Montenegro	
2003 (15th)	"Estoy Sufriendo"	Germán Lizárraga and su Banda Estrellas de Sinaloa	
2003 (15th)	"Cada Vez y Cada Vez"	José José	
2003 (15th)	"No Me Se Rajar"	Banda el Recodo	
2003 (15th)	"Perdóname Mi Amor"	Conjunto Primavera	
2003 (15th)	"Tu Forma de Ser"	Alberto and Roberto	
2004 (16th)	"No Tengo Dinero"‡	Kumbia Kings, Juan Gabriel and El Gran Silencio	
2004 (16th)	"Una Vez Más"	Conjunto Primavera	
2004 (16th)	"De Uno y De Todos Modos"	Palomo	
2004 (16th)	"El Indio Enamorado"	Grupo Laberinto	
2004 (16th)	"Muy a tu Manera"	Intocable	
2004 (16th)	"Sueña"	Intocable	
2005 (17th)	"Más Que Tu Amigo"‡	Marco Antonio Solís	
2005 (17th)	"Dos Locos"	Los Horóscopos de Durango	
2005 (17th)	"Hazme Olvidarla"	Conjunto Primavera	
2005 (17th)	"Lágrimas de Dristal	Montez de Durango	
2005 (17th)	"Te Quise Olvidar"	Montez de Durango	
2006 (18th)	"Aire"‡	Intocable	
2006 (18th)	"Eres Divina"	Patrulla 81	
2006 (18th)	"Está Llorando Mi Corazón"	Beto y Sus Canarios	
2006 (18th)	"Hoy Como Ayer"	Conjunto Primavera	
2006 (18th)	"Volveré"	K-Paz de la Sierra	
2007 (19th)	"Alguien te Va a Hacer Llorar"‡	Intocable	
2007 (19th)	"Aliado del Tiempo"	Mariano Barba	
2007 (19th)	"Algo de Mí"	Conjunto Primavera	
2007 (19th)	"De Contrabando"	Jenni Rivera	
2007 (19th)	"Lagrimillas Tontas"	Montéz de Durango	
2008 (20th)	"La Noche Perfecta"‡	El Chapo de Sinaloa	
2008 (20th)	"Dime Quien Es"	Los Rieleros del Norte	
2008 (20th)	"Cada Vez Que Pienso en Ti"	Los Creadorez del Pasito Duranguense de Alfredo Ramírez	
2008 (20th)	"De Rodillas Te Pido"	Alegres de la Sierra	
2008 (20th)	"Mil Heridas"	Cuisillos	
2009 (21st)	"Un Buen Perdedor"‡	K-Paz de la Sierra with Franco De Vita	
2009 (21st)	"Hasta el Día de Hoy"	Los Dareyes de la Sierra	
2009 (21st)	"Si Te Agarran Las Ganas	El Chapo de Sinaloa	
2009 (21st)	"Sobre Mis Pies"	La Arrolladora Banda El Limón	
2009 (21st)	"Te Lloré"	Conjunto Primavera	
2010 (22nd)	"Lo Intentamos"‡	Espinoza Paz	
2010 (22nd)	"El Último Beso"	Vicente Fernández	
2010 (22nd)	"Quiéreme Más"	Patrulla 81	
2010 (22nd)	"Te Presumo"	Banda el Recodo	
2010 (22nd)	"Ya Es Muy Tarde"	La Arrolladora Banda El Limón	
2011 (23rd)	"Me Gusta Todo De Ti"‡	Banda el Recodo	
2011 (23rd)	"Al Menos"	La Original Banda El Limon	
2011 (23rd)	"Ando Bien Pedo"	Banda Los Recoditos	
2011 (23rd)	"Me Enamoré de Ti"	Los Titanes De Durango	
2011 (23rd)	"Sin Evidencias"	Banda Sinaloense MS de Sergio Lizarraga	
2012 (24th)	"El Padrino"‡	Joan Sebastian	
2012 (24th)	"Cuánto Me Cuesta"	La Arrolladora Banda El Limón	
2012 (24th)	"El Ardido"	Larry Hernandez	
2012 (24th)	"Gracias a Dios"	Violento	
2012 (24th)	"Te Amo y Te Amo"	La Adictiva Banda San José de Mesillas	
2013 (25th)	"Amor Confuso"‡	Gerardo Ortíz	
2013 (25th)	"Llamada de Mi Ex"	La Arrolladora Banda El Limón de René Camacho	
2013 (25th)	"Te Quiero a Morir"	Banda el Recodo	
2013 (25th)	"El Mejor Perfume"	La Original Banda El Limón de Salvador Lizárraga	
2013 (25th)	"Tu Ya Eres Cosa del Pasado"	Fidel Rueda	
2014 (26th)	"Sólo Vine a Despedirme"‡	Gerardo Ortíz	
2014 (26th)	"La Mejor de Todas"	Banda el Recodo	
2014 (26th)	"Mi Promesa"	Pesado	
2014 (26th)	"Adivina"	Noel Torres	
2014 (26th)	"Y Ahora Resulta"	Voz de Mando	
2015 (27th)	"Mujer de Piedra"‡	Gerardo Ortíz	
2015 (27th)	"Vas a Llorar por Mi"	Banda el Recodo de Cruz Lizárraga	
2015 (27th)	"Mi Ultimo Deseo"	Banda Los Recoditos	
2015 (27th)	"Hermosa Experiencia"	Banda Sinaloense MS de Sergio Lizárraga	
2015 (27th)	"Muchacho de Campo"	Voz de Mando	

== See also ==
- Latin Grammy Award for Best Regional Song
