= Lo Nuestro Award for Mexican Music Male Artist of the Year =

Latin music award

Lo Nuestro Awards for Mexican Music Male Artist of the Year
- Current: Premio Lo Nuestro 2026
- Awarded for: Mexican Music Male Artist of the Year
- Country: United States
- Presented by: Univision
- First award: 1992
- Currently held by: Carín León (2026)

Highlights
- Most awards: Christian Nodal (5)
- Most nominations: Vicente Fernández and Marco Antonio Solis (10)
- Website: univision.com/premiolonuestro

The Lo Nuestro Award for Mexican Music Male Artist of the Year is an award presented annually by American network Univision. The accolade was established to recognize the most talented performers of Latin music. The nominees and winners were originally selected by a voting poll conducted among program directors of Spanish-language radio stations in the United States and also based on chart performance on Billboard Latin music charts, with the results being tabulated and certified by the accounting firm Deloitte. At the present time, the winners are selected by the audience through an online survey. The trophy awarded is shaped in the form of a treble clef.

Prior to 1992, the award was known as Regional Mexican Artist of the Year, until the category was split to form Regional Mexican Male Artist of the Year and the Regional Mexican Female Artist of the Year award. The award was Combined again in 2017 before being split up again in 2023. In 2025 the award was renamed to the Mexican Music Male Artist of the Year.

The award was first presented to Mexican singer Vicente Fernández in 1992. Mexican performer Christian Nodal hols the record for the most awards with 5.

== Winners and nominees ==
Listed below are the winners of the award for each year, as well as the other nominees for the majority of the years awarded.

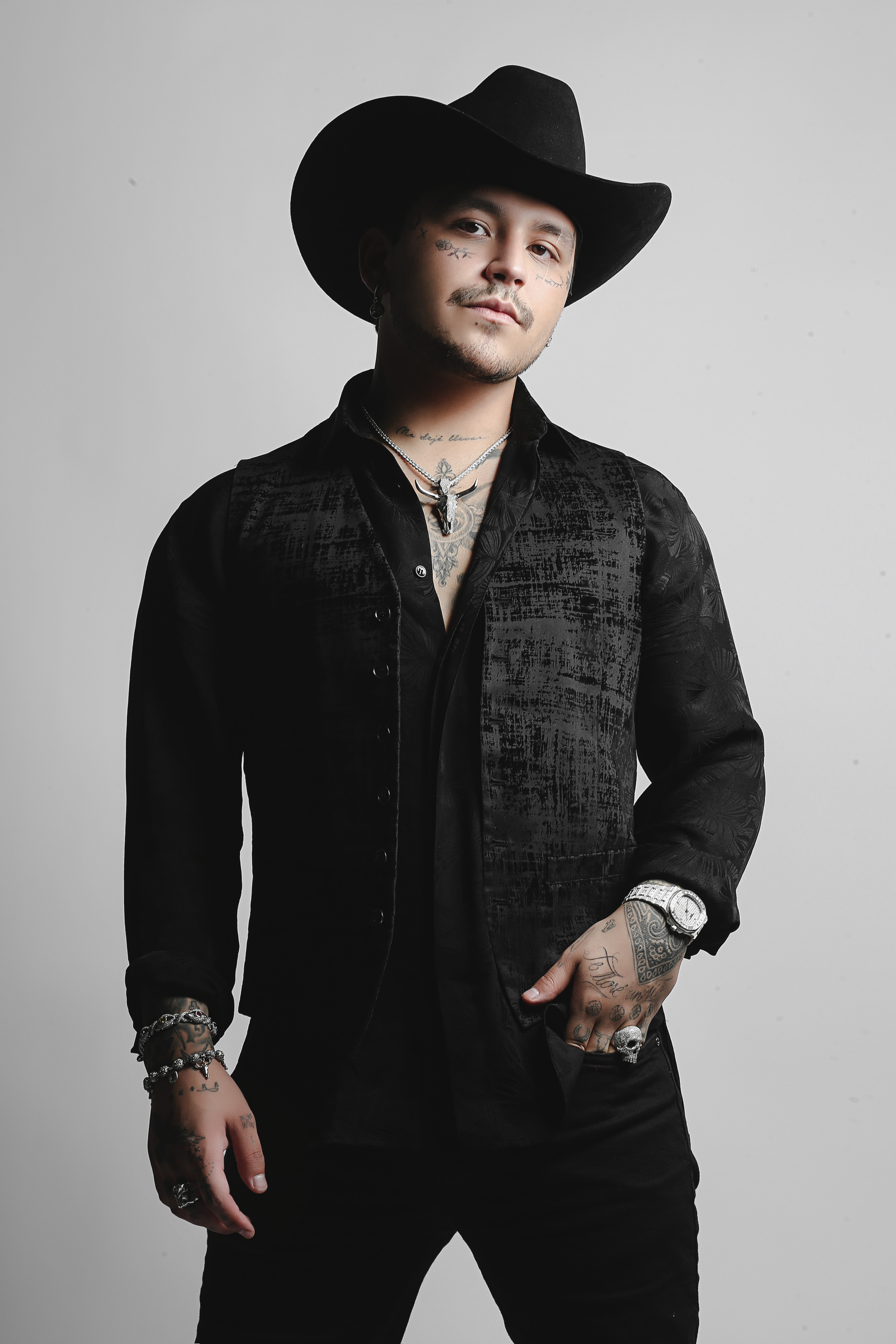
Mexican singer Christian Nodal, (pictured in 2022), the performer with the most wins. He won the award 5 times consecutively from 2019-2023

Key	Meaning
‡	Indicates the winner

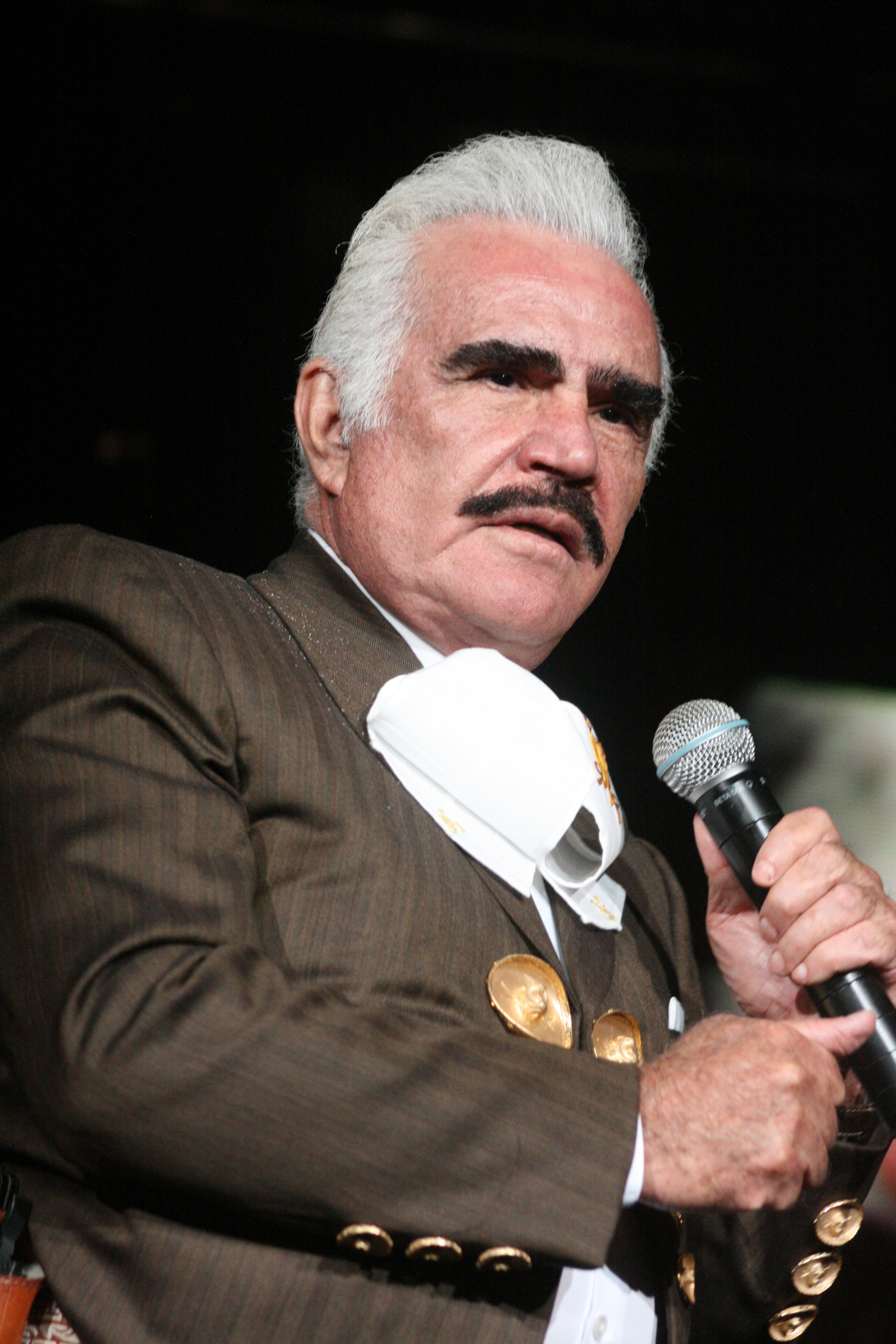
Mexican singer Vicente Fernández (pictured in 2011), winner in 1992, 1993, and 2009

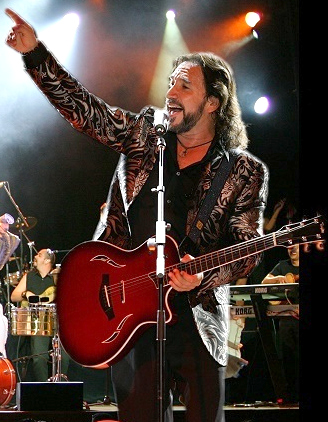
Mexican singer Marco Antonio Solis (pictured in 2006), one of the two performers tied for second with 4 wins, winner in 1997, 2004, 2006, and 2008

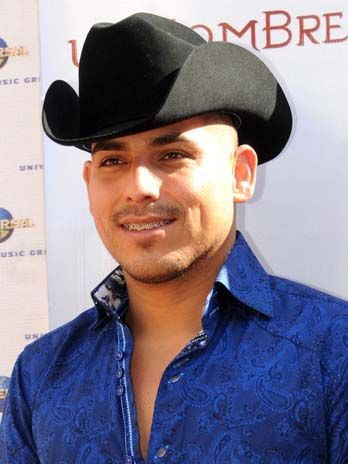
Mexican singer Espinoza Paz (pictured in 2012), the other performer with 4 wins, winner in 2010, 2011, 2012, and 2013

Year	Performer	Ref
1992 (4th)	Vicente Fernández ‡	
1992 (4th)	Ramón Ayala	
1992 (4th)	Roberto Pulido	
1992 (4th)	Juan Valentin	
1993 (5th)	Vicente Fernández ‡	
1993 (5th)	Alejandro Fernández	
1993 (5th)	Flaco Jiménez	
1993 (5th)	Emilio Navaira	
1994 (6th)	Alejandro Fernández ‡	
1994 (6th)	Vicente Fernández	
1994 (6th)	Emilio Navaira	
1994 (6th)	Joan Sebastian	
1995 (7th)	Alejandro Fernández ‡	
1995 (7th)	Pepe Aguilar	
1995 (7th)	Vicente Fernández	
1995 (7th)	Ezequiel Peña	
1996 (8th)	Cristian Castro ‡	
1996 (8th)	Pete Astudillo	
1996 (8th)	Vicente Fernández	
1996 (8th)	Juan Gabriel	
1997 (9th)	Marco Antonio Solís ‡	
1997 (9th)	Alejandro Fernández	
1997 (9th)	Pedro Fernández	
1997 (9th)	Juan Gabriel	
1998 (10th)	Alejandro Fernández ‡	
1998 (10th)	Pedro Fernández	
1998 (10th)	Juan Gabriel	
1998 (10th)	Marco Antonio Solís	
1999 (11th)	Pepe Aguilar ‡	
1999 (11th)	Pedro Fernández	
1999 (11th)	Joan Sebastian	
1999 (11th)	Marco Antonio Solís	
2000 (12th)	Pepe Aguilar ‡	
2000 (12th)	Alejandro Fernández	
2000 (12th)	Vicente Fernández	
2000 (12th)	Juan Gabriel	
2001 (13th)	Pepe Aguilar ‡	
2001 (13th)	Pedro Fernández	
2001 (13th)	Vicente Fernández	
2001 (13th)	Joan Sebastian	
2002 (14th)	Lupillo Rivera ‡	
2002 (14th)	Pepe Aguilar	
2002 (14th)	Vicente Fernández	
2002 (14th)	Joan Sebastian	
2003 (15th)	Joan Sebastian ‡	
2003 (15th)	Lupillo Rivera	
2003 (15th)	Marco Antonio Solís	
2003 (15th)	Pedro Fernández	
2004 (16th)	Marco Antonio Solís ‡	
2004 (16th)	Joan Sebastian	
2004 (16th)	Jorge Luis Cabrera	
2004 (16th)	Pepe Aguilar	
2005 (17th)	Adán Chalino ‡	
2005 (17th)	Joan Sebastian	
2005 (17th)	Marco Antonio Solís	
2005 (17th)	Pepe Aguilar	
2006 (18th)	Marco Antonio Solís ‡	
2006 (18th)	Luis Miguel	
2006 (18th)	Pepe Aguilar	
2006 (18th)	Sergio Vega	
2007 (19th)	Joan Sebastian ‡	
2007 (19th)	El Chapo de Sinaloa	
2007 (19th)	Mariano Barba	
2007 (19th)	Sergio Vega	
2008 (20th)	Marco Antonio Solís ‡	
2008 (20th)	El Chapo de Sinaloa	
2008 (20th)	Joan Sebastian	
2008 (20th)	Mariano Barba	
2009 (21st)	Vicente Fernández ‡	
2009 (21st)	El Chapo de Sinaloa	
2009 (21st)	El Potro de Sinaloa	
2009 (21st)	El Potro de Sinaloa	
2009 (21st)	Marco Antonio Solís	
2010 (22nd)	Espinoza Paz ‡	
2010 (22nd)	El Chapo de Sinaloa	
2010 (22nd)	German Montero	
2010 (22nd)	Marco Antonio Solís	
2010 (22nd)	Vicente Fernández	
2011 (23rd)	Espinoza Paz ‡	
2011 (23rd)	Joan Sebastian	
2011 (23rd)	Julión Álvarez	
2011 (23rd)	Larry Hernandez	
2011 (23rd)	Pedro Fernández	
2012 (24th)	Espinoza Paz ‡	
2012 (24th)	Gerardo Ortíz	
2012 (24th)	Julión Alvarez	
2012 (24th)	Larry Hernandez	
2013 (25th)	Espinoza Paz ‡	
2013 (25th)	Julión Álvarez	
2013 (25th)	Gerardo Ortíz	
2013 (25th)	Fidel Rueda	
2014 (26th)	Gerardo Ortíz ‡	
2014 (26th)	Julión Álvarez	
2014 (26th)	Chuy Lizárraga	
2014 (26th)	Roberto Tapia	
2014 (26th)	Noel Torres	
2015 (27th)	Luis Coronel ‡	
2015 (27th)	Julión Álvarez	
2015 (27th)	El Komander	
2015 (27th)	Gerardo Ortíz	
2015 (27th)	Noel Torres	
2016 (28th)	Luis Coronel ‡	
2016 (28th)	Julión Álvarez	
2016 (28th)	Ariel Camacho	
2016 (28th)	Gerardo Ortíz	
2017 (29th)	Julión Álvarez ‡	
2017 (29th)	Régulo Caro	
2017 (29th)	Gerardo Ortíz	
2017 (29th)	Remmy Valenzuela	
2019 (31st)	Christian Nodal ‡	
2019 (31st)	Gerardo Ortiz	
2019 (31st)	Joss Favela	
2019 (31st)	Luis Coronel	
2019 (31st)	Raymix	
2020 (32nd)	Christian Nodal ‡	
2020 (32nd)	El Fantasma	
2020 (32nd)	Raymix	
2020 (32nd)	Regulo Caro	
2020 (32nd)	Remmy Valenzuela	
2021 (33rd)	Christian Nodal ‡	
2021 (33rd)	Alejandro Fernández	
2021 (33rd)	Carín León	
2021 (33rd)	Chiquis	
2021 (33rd)	El Fantasma	
2021 (33rd)	Gerardo Ortíz	
2021 (33rd)	Joss Favela	
2021 (33rd)	Neto Bernal	
2021 (33rd)	Lenin Ramírez	
2021 (33rd)	Natanael Cano	
2022 (34th)	Christian Nodal ‡	
2022 (34th)	Adrián Chaparro	
2022 (34th)	Alejandro Fernández	
2022 (34th)	Alfredo Olivas	
2022 (34th)	Ángela Aguilar	
2022 (34th)	Carin León	
2022 (34th)	El Fantasma	
2022 (34th)	Gerardo Ortiz	
2022 (34th)	Joss Favela	
2022 (34th)	Lenin Ramírez	
2023 (35th)	Christian Nodal ‡	
2023 (35th)	Adriel Favela	
2023 (35th)	Alfredo Olivas	
2023 (35th)	Carín León	
2023 (35th)	Edén Muñoz	
2023 (35th)	El Fantasma	
2023 (35th)	Gerardo Ortiz	
2023 (35th)	Joss Favela	
2023 (35th)	Lenin Ramírez	
2023 (35th)	Pepe Aguilar	
