= Grammy Award for Best Banda Album =

Grammy Award

- Awarded for: quality banda music albums
- Country: United States
- Presented by: National Academy of Recording Arts and Sciences
- First award: 2007
- Final award: 2011
- Website: grammy.com

The Grammy Award for Best Banda Album was an award presented at the Grammy Awards, a ceremony that was established in 1958 and originally called the Gramophone Awards, to recording artists for quality albums in the banda music genre. Honors in several categories are presented at the ceremony annually by the National Academy of Recording Arts and Sciences of the United States to "honor artistic achievement, technical proficiency, and overall excellence in the recording industry, without regard to album sales or chart position".

The award was first presented to Joan Sebastian in 2007 for the album Más Allá del Sol. Two posthumous nominations were announced for the 50th Grammy Awards (2008) following the deaths of three banda musicians in Mexico within one week. Shortly following the murders of Sergio Gómez, a singer with the group K-Paz de la Sierra, and Zayda Peña of the band Zayda Y Los Culpables, Los Conde trumpet player Jose Luis Aquino was found dead. In December 2007, Grammy organizers announced that Gomez along with singer Valentín Elizalde, who was killed in November 2006, were nominated for awards. Categorized under the Latin field, the award is presented for vocal or instrumental banda albums. As of 2011, Sebastian is the only artist to win the award more than once. The award has been presented to artists or groups originating from Mexico each year to date.

The award was discontinued in 2012 due to a major overhaul of Grammy categories. The Best Banda Album category merged with the Best Norteño Album category to form the new Best Banda or Norteño Album category.

== Recipients ==
Year^{[I]}	Performing artist(s)	Work	Nominees	Ref.
2007	Joan Sebastian	Más Allá del Sol	Banda Machos – 20 Mil Heridas; Banda El Recodo de Cruz Lizárraga – Mas Fuerte Que Nunca; Cuisillos – Amor Gitano; Ezequiel Peña – A Mucha Honra	
2008	El Chapo	Te Va a Gustar	Corridos (El Potro de Sinaloa) – Los Mejores; Valentín Elizalde – Lobo Domesticado; K-Paz de la Sierra – Conquistando Corazones; Lupillo Rivera – Entre Copas y Botellas	
2009	Joan Sebastian	No es de Madera	Alacranes Musical – Tu Inspiración; Banda el Recodo de Cruz Lizárraga – Que Bonito... ¡Es Lo Bonito!; Cuisillos – Vive y Dejame Vivir; Lupillo Rivera – El Tiro de Gracia	
2010	Lupillo Rivera	Tu Esclavo y Amo	El Güero y Su Banda Centenario – Se Nos Murio El Amor; La Arrolladora Banda El Limón de Rene Camacho – Más Adelante; La Original Banda El Limón de Salvador Lizárraga – Derecho de Antiguedad	
2011	El Güero y Su Banda Centenario	Enamórate De Mí	Banda Los Recoditos – ¡Ando Bien Pedo!; Cuisillos – Caricias Compradas; El Chapo – Con la Fuerza del Corrido; La Arrolladora Banda El Limón – Todo Depende de Tí	

^{^[I]} Each year is linked to the article about the Grammy Awards held that year.

== See also ==
- Latin Grammy Award for Best Banda Album
- List of Grammy Award categories
