= Latin Grammy Award for Best Banda Album =

- Awarded for: quality albums of the banda music genre
- Country: United States
- Presented by: The Latin Recording Academy
- First award: 2000
- Currently held by: Edén Muñoz for Piedras a la Luna (2026)
- Website: latingrammy.com

The Latin Grammy Award for Best Banda Album is an honor presented annually at the Latin Grammy Awards, a ceremony that recognizes excellence and creates a wider awareness of cultural diversity and contributions of Latin recording artists in the United States and internationally.

The award goes to solo artists, duos, or groups for releasing vocal or instrumental albums containing at least 51% of new recordings in the banda music genre.

The award was first presented to Banda el Recodo for the album Lo Mejor de Mi Vida at the 1st Latin Grammy Awards ceremony in 2000. They are the most awarded band in this category with eight wins out of 15 nominations and are followed by Chiquis Rivera with three wins. Banda Machos hold the record for most nominations without a win, with six.

== Recipients ==
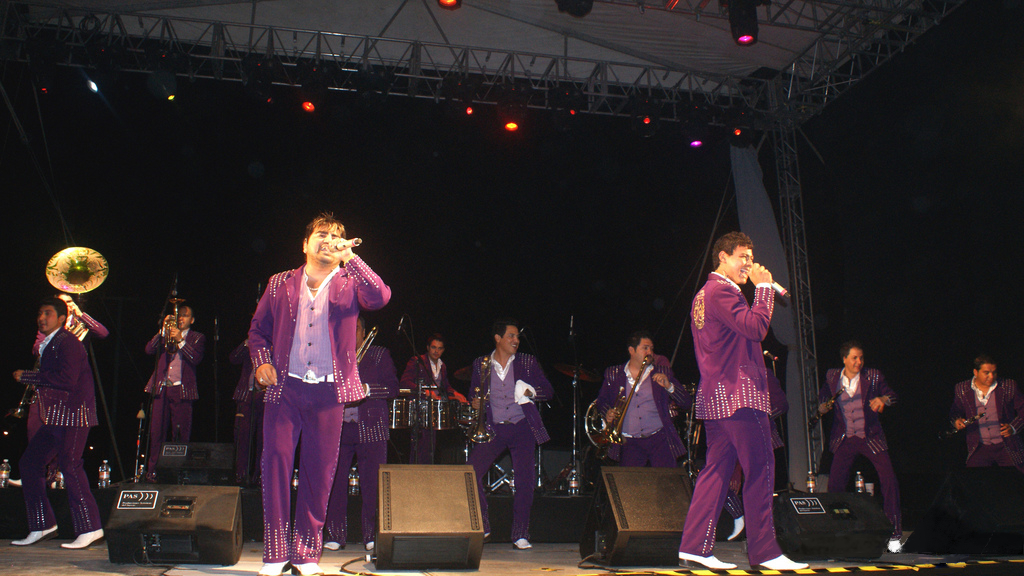
Mexican banda Banda El Recodo de Cruz Lizárraga holds the record of most wins in the category with eight as well as most nominations with fourteen. They were also the first recipients of the award in 2000 for Lo Mejor de Mi Vida.

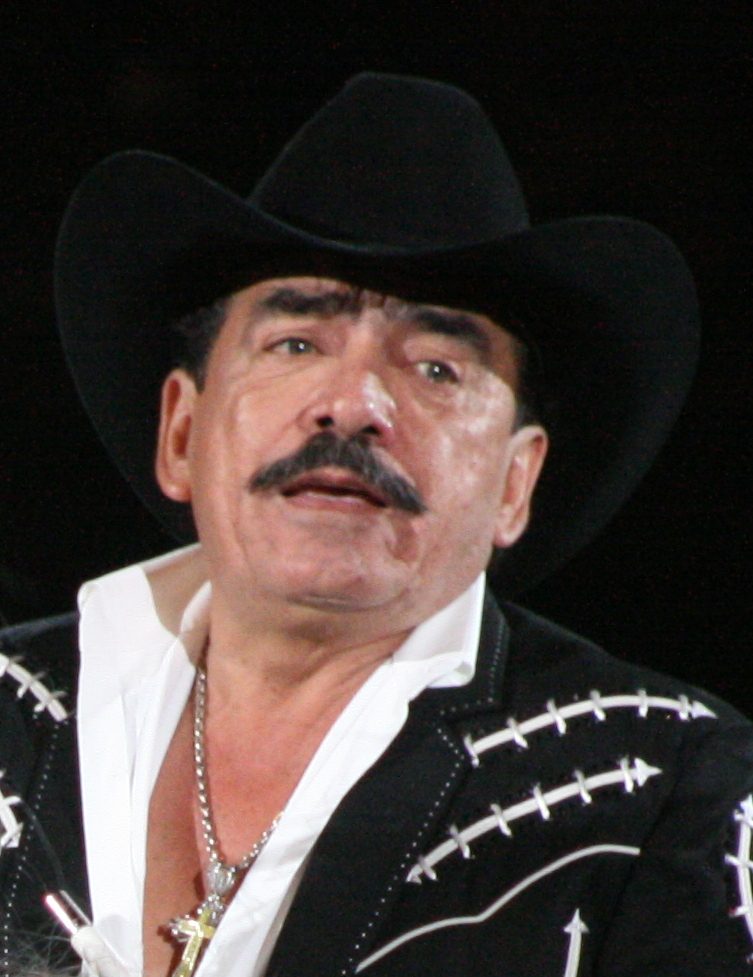
Two-time winner, Mexican singer-songwriter Joan Sebastian. He was the first solo act to receive the award.

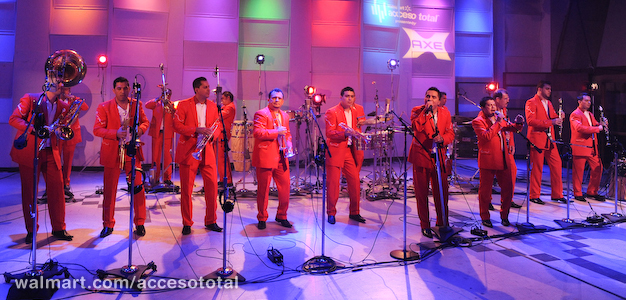
Two-time winners La Arrolladora Banda El Limón De René Camacho.

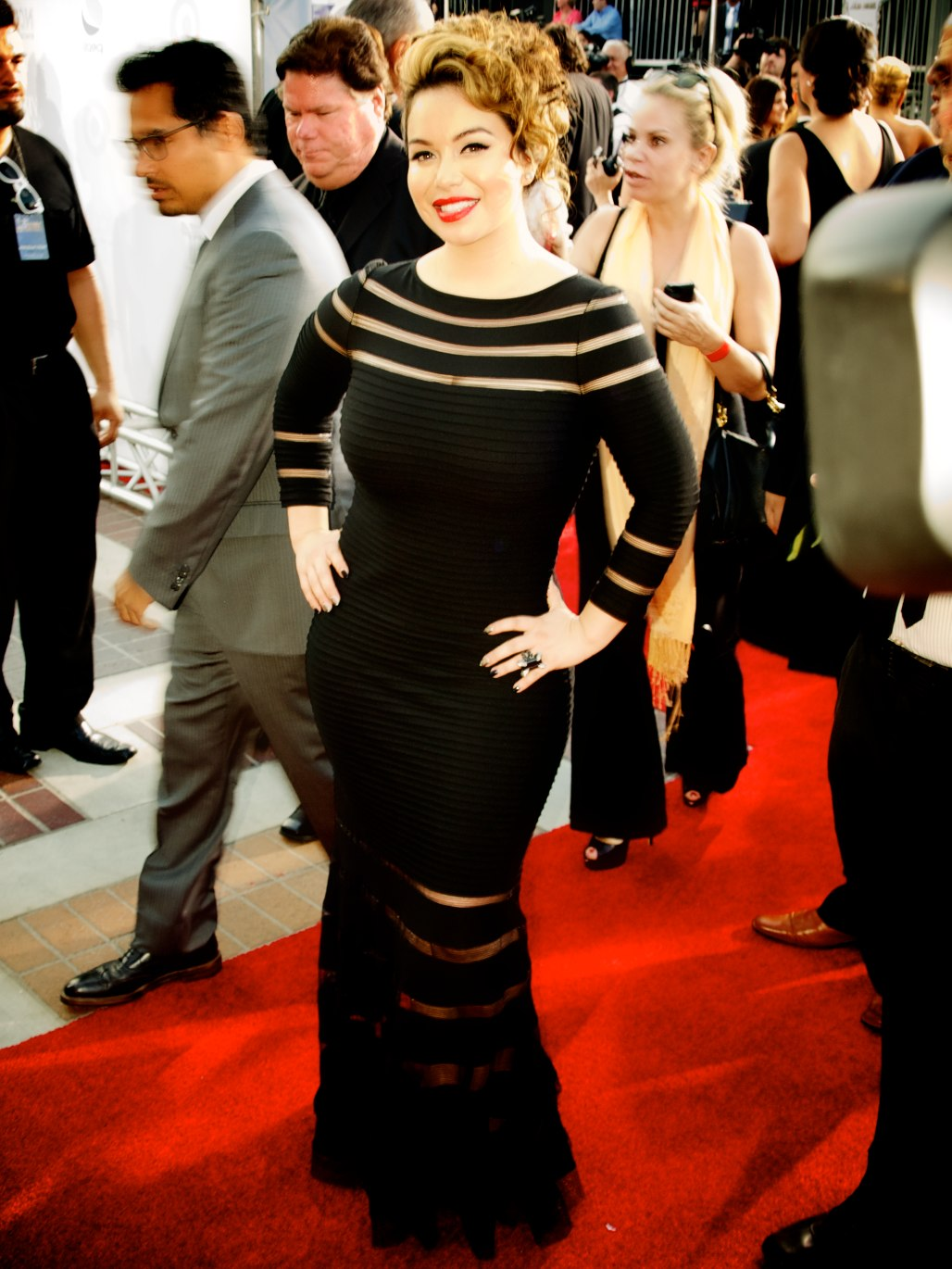
Three-time winner, Chiquis Rivera, is the first and only solo female singer to date to win the award, receiving it in 2020, 2022 and 2024.

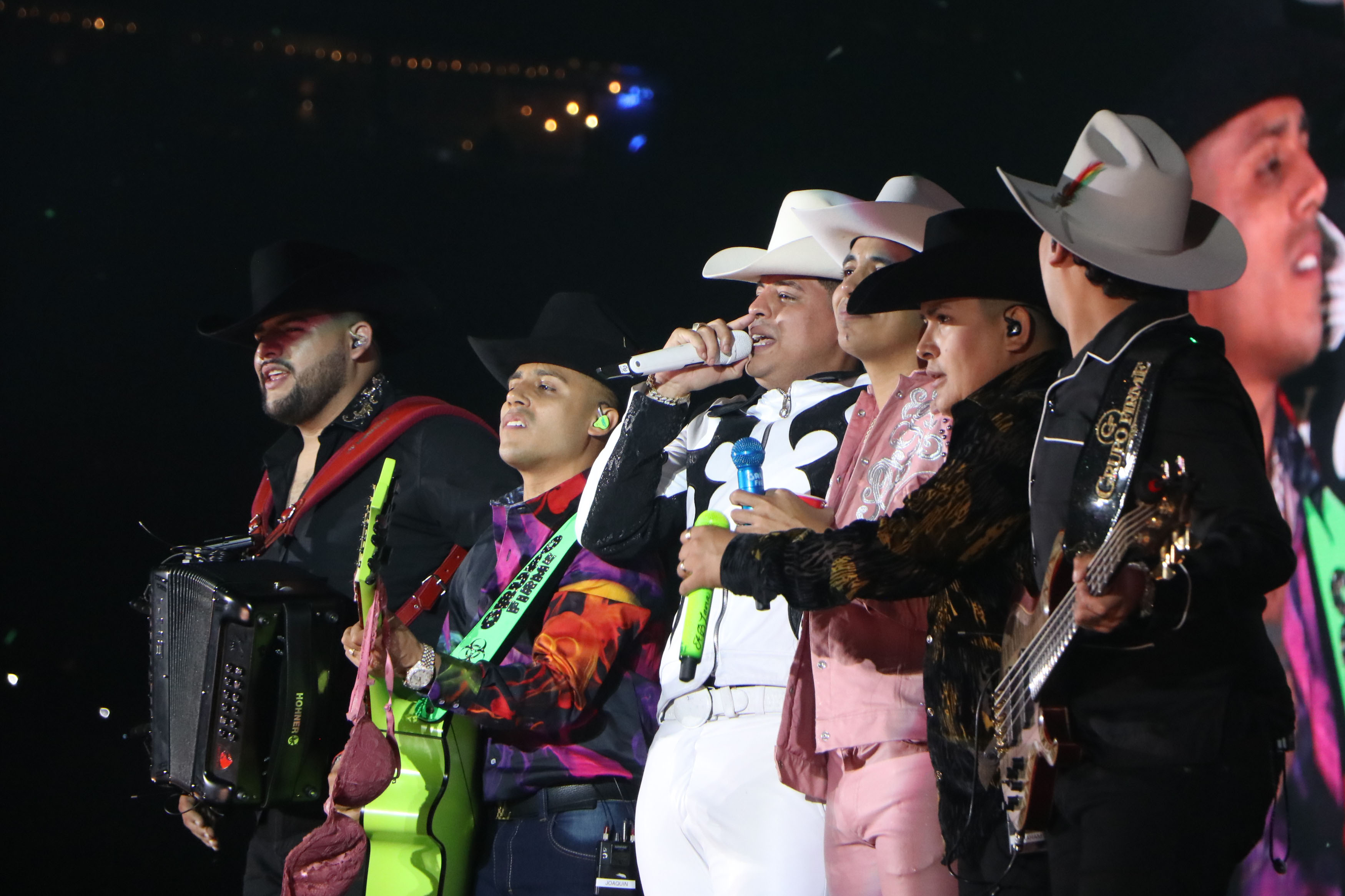
2021 winner, Grupo Firme.

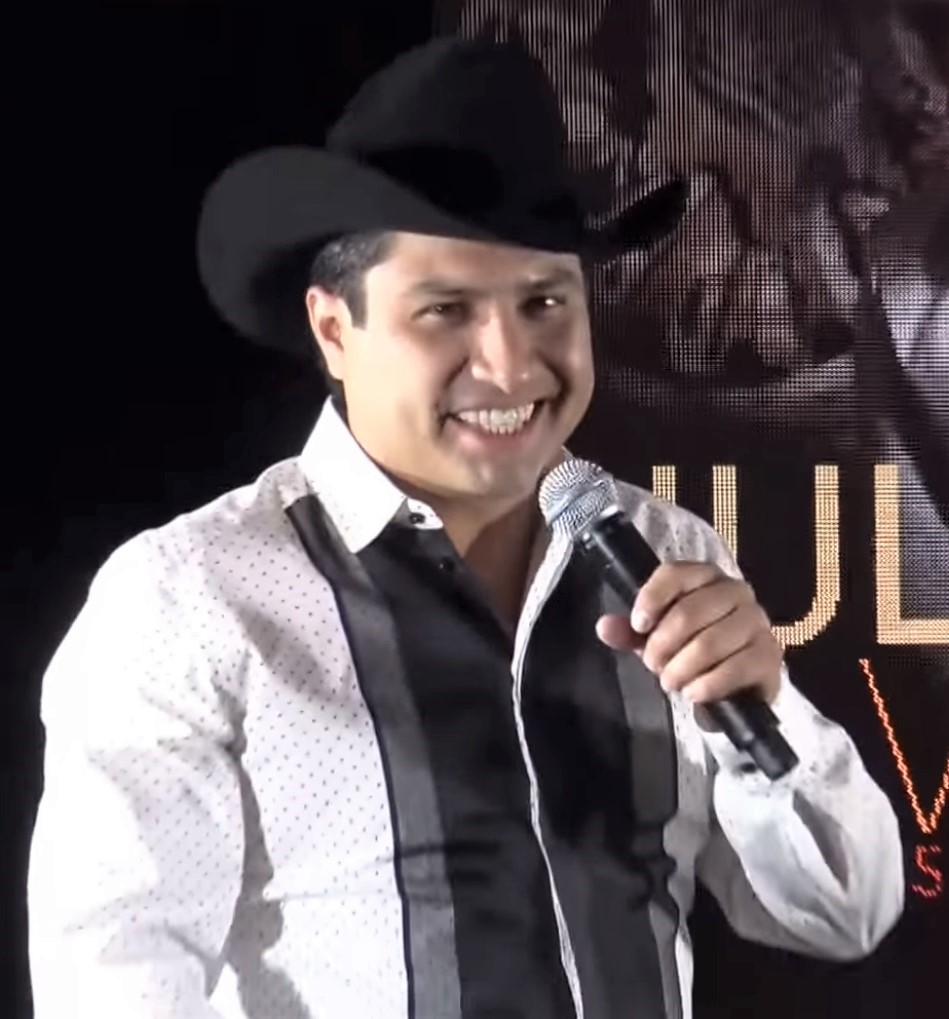
Julión Álvarez y Su Norteño Banda have won twice, in 2023 and 2025.

Year^{[I]}	Performing artist(s)	Work	Nominees^{[II]}	Ref.
2000	Banda el Recodo	Lo Mejor de Mi Vida	Banda Arkángel R-15 – Esperando un ángel; Banda Machos – Rancheras de oro; Banda Maguey – Mil Gracias; Graciela Beltrán – La reina del pueblo con banda; Joan Sebastian – El rey del jaripeo	
2001	Banda el Recodo	Contigo Por Siempre	Banda Arkángel R-15 – Reina De Reinas; Banda Limonense – Por Una Mujer Bonita; Banda Machos – Mi Guitarra y Yo; Carmen Jara – Arráncame La Vida	
2002	Cuisillos de Arturo Macias	Puras Rancheras Con Cuisillos	Banda Machos – A Prueba de Balas; Banda Pachuco – Quedate Conmigo; Jenni Rivera – Se las Voy a Dar a Otro; Thalía – Thalía con banda: Grandes éxitos	
2003	Joan Sebastian	Afortunado	Banda Centenario – Homenaje a un Amigo; Banda el Recodo – No Me Sé Rajar; Banda Machos – Banda Machos; Cuisillos de Arturo Macias – ...No Voy a Llorar	
2004	Banda el Recodo	Por Ti	Cuisillos de Arturo Macias – Corazón; El Coyote y su Banda Tierra Santa – El Rancho Grande; Los Horóscopos de Durango – Puras de Rompe y Rasga; Lupillo Rivera – Live! en Concierto – Universal Amphitheatre	
2005	Banda el Recodo	En Vivo	Conjunto Atardecer – Los Número Uno del Pasito Duranguense; K-Paz de la Sierra – Pensando en Ti; Los Horóscopos de Durango – Locos de Amor; Lupillo Rivera – Con Mis Propias Manos	
2006	Joan Sebastian	Más Allá del Sol	Banda el Recodo – Hay Amor; Graciela Beltrán – Rancherísimas Con Banda; El Coyote y Su Banda Tierra Santa – Prohibido; Los Horóscopos de Durango – Antes Muertas Que Sencillas	
2007	Los Horóscopos de Durango	Desatados	Alacranes Musical – Ahora y Siempre; Banda Machos – A Pesar De Todo; Graciela Beltrán – Promesas No; Valentín Elizalde y su Banda Guasaveña – Lobo Domesticado; Grupo Montéz de Durango – ¡Agárrese!	
2008	Los Horóscopos de Durango	Ayer, Hoy y Siempre	Banda el Recodo – Qué Bonito... ¡Es Lo Bonito!; El Chapo – Mis Rancheras Consentidas; Los Creadorez del Pasito Duranguense de Alfredo Ramírez – Listos, Montados y Armados; Joan Sebastian – No Es De Madera	
2009	Alacranes Musical	Tu Inspiración	Cuisillos de Arturo Macias – Vientos De Cambio; Dareyes De La Sierra – Una Copa Mas; Valentín Elizalde – Solamente El Gallo De Oro; Germán Montero – Compréndeme	
2010	Banda el Recodo	Me Gusta Todo de Tí	La Original Banda El Limón de Salvador Lizarraga – Soy Tu Maestro; Banda Los Recoditos – ¡Ando Bien Pedo!; El Chapo de Sinaloa – Con La Fuerza del Corrido; K-Paz de la Sierra – Con Banda	
2011	La Arrolladora Banda El Limón De René Camacho	Todo Depende de Ti	Banda Los Recoditos – A Toda Madre; Banda Machos – 20 Años de Éxitos en Vivo; El Güero y Su Banda Centenario – Estaré Mejor; Espinoza Paz – Del Rancho Para El Mundo; Jenni Rivera – La Gran Señora en Vivo	
2012	La Arrolladora Banda El Limón De René Camacho	Irreversible...2012	Cristina – Golpes de pecho; La Adictiva Banda San José De Mesillas – Nada iguales; Fidel Rueda – Sinaloense hasta las chachas; Beto Zapata – Prisionero de tus zapatos	
2013	Banda Los Recoditos	El Free	Banda Carnaval – Las Vueltas de la Vida; Cuisillos – 2012 Fin y Principio De Una Era; El Dasa – Pá La Raza; La Adictiva Banda De San José Mesillas – Muchas Gracias	
2013	La Original Banda El Limón De Salvador Lizárraga	La Original y Sus Boleros de Amor	Banda Carnaval – Las Vueltas de la Vida; Cuisillos – 2012 Fin y Principio De Una Era; El Dasa – Pá La Raza; La Adictiva Banda De San José Mesillas – Muchas Gracias	
2014	Banda El Recodo de Don Cruz Lizarraga	Haciendo Historia	Cristina – Grandes Canciones; La Arrolladora Banda El Limón – Gracias Por Creer; La Arrolladora Banda El Limón De René Camacho – Fin De Semana; Luz María – Lágrimas Y Lluvia	
2015	Banda El Recodo De Don Cruz Lizarraga	Mi Vicio Mas Grande	Julión Álvarez y Su Norteño Banda – El Aferrado; Banda Rancho Viejo – Dejando Huella; El Coyote y Su Banda Tierra Santa – Alucine; La Arrolladora Banda El Limón De René Camacho – Ojos En Blanco	
2016	Banda El Recodo De Cruz Lizárraga	Raíces	Julión Álvarez – Mis Ídolos, Hoy Mis Amigos!!!; Banda Los Recoditos – Me Está Gustando; Banda Troyana – Tengo Ganas De Ser Fiel; La Séptima Banda – A Todos Volumen	
2017	Banda El Recodo de Cruz Lizárraga	Ayer y Hoy	El Chapo de Sinaloa – Mis Decretos; Maribel Guardia – Besos Callejeros; La Original Banda El Limón de Salvador Lizárraga – El Mayor de Mis Antojos; Lalo Mora – Un Millón de Primaveras	
2018	Banda Los Recoditos	Los Gustos Que Me Doy	Banda Los Sebastianes – En Vida; Luis Coronel – Ahora Soy Yo; Jerry Demara – Brindemos; El Fantasma y Su Equipo Armado – En El Camino	
2019	Banda Los Sebastianes	A Través Del Vaso	Saul El Jaguar Alarcón – Para Que No Te Lo Imagines; El Mimoso – 25 Años Vol 1; La Explosiva Banda De Maza – Un Tributo Al Sol; Edwin Luna y La Trakalosa De Monterrey – Me Hiciste Un Borracho	
2020	Chiquis	Playlist	Banda La Ejecutiva De Mazatlán Sinaloa – Te Encontré; Banda Lirio – Al Rey José Alfredo Jiménez; La Arrolladora Banda El Limón de René Camacho – Labios Mentirosos; La Séptima Banda – Salud Por Nuestro 25 Aniversario	
2021	Grupo Firme	Nos Divertimos Logrando lo Imposible	Banda El Recodo de Cruz Lizárraga – Concierto Mundial Digital Live; Banda Los Recoditos – Vivir la Vida; Banda Los Sebastianes – Sin Miedo al Éxito; Joss Favela – Llegando al Rancho	
2022	Chiquis	Abeja Reina	Banda El Recodo de Cruz Lizárraga – Esta Vida es Muy Bonita; Banda Fortuna – Va de Nuevo; Banda Los Recoditos – Me Siento a Todo Dar; Banda Los Sebastianes – Sin Miedo al Éxito (Deluxe)	
2023	Julión Álvarez y Su Norteño Banda	De Hoy en Adelante, Que Te Vaya Bien	Banda El Recodo de Cruz Lizárraga – Hecho en México...Mágico; Banda MS de Sergio Lizárraga – Punto y Aparte; Nathan Galante – Una Copa Por Cada Reina; La Adictiva – 1500 Pedas; La Arrolladora Banda El Limón de René Camacho – Prefiero Estar Contigo (Deluxe)	
2024	Chiquis	Diamantes	Julión Álvarez y Su Norteño Banda – Presente; Luis Ángel "El Flaco" – Yo Te Extrañaré	
2025	Julión Álvarez y su Norteño Banda	4218	Luis Ángel "El Flaco" – 25 Aniversario (Deluxe); Banda MS de Sergio Lizárraga – Edición Limitada	
2026	Edén Muñoz	Piedras a la Luna	Luis Ángel "El Flaco" – Tequila y Guaro; Banda Los Recoditos – Piratita	

^{^[I]} Each year is linked to the article about the Latin Grammy Awards held that year.

== See also ==
- Grammy Award for Best Banda or Norteño Album
- Latin Grammy Award for Best Regional Song
