= Tu Recuerdo =

Tu Recuerdo or variants may refer to:

== Music ==
- A Tu Recuerdo, 1998 album by Los Yonic's

=== Songs ===
- Tu Recuerdo (Ilegales song), hit single by Ilegales composed by Vladimir Dotel from On Time 2000
- "Tu Recuerdo" (Ricky Martin song), 2006
- "Tu Recuerdo y Yo", 2001 song by Lupillo Rivera
