= Premio Lo Nuestro 2002 =

Latin Music awards show

14th Lo Nuestro Awards
- Date: Thursday, February 7, 2002
- Site: James L. Knight Center, Miami, Florida, USA

Highlights
- Most awards: Olga Tañón (5)
- Most nominations: Olga Tañón (4)

The 14th Lo Nuestro Awards ceremony, presented by Univision and honoring the best Latin music of 2001 and 2002, took place on February 7, 2002, at a live presentation held at the James L. Knight Center in Miami, Florida. The ceremony was broadcast in the United States and Latin America by Univision.

During the ceremony, twenty-nine categories were presented. Winners were announced at the live event and included Puerto-Rican American singer Olga Tañón receiving four competitive awards. Mexican band Palomo won three awards. Mexican singer-songwriter Juan Gabriel, Chilean band La Ley, and Mexican-American performer Lupillo Rivera earned two accolades. Puerto-Rican American singer Gilberto Santa Rosa also was awarded in two categories and received a special tribute along with Juan Gabriel. Mexican singer José José was presented with the Excellence Award.

== Background ==
In 1989, the Lo Nuestro Awards were established by Univision, to recognize the most talented performers of Latin music. The nominees and winners were selected by a voting poll conducted among program directors of Spanish-language radio stations in the United States and the results were tabulated and certified by the accounting firm Arthur Andersen. The trophy awarded is shaped like a treble clef. The 14th Lo Nuestro Awards ceremony was held on February 7, 2002, in a live presentation held at the James L. Knight Center in Miami, Florida. The ceremony was broadcast in the United States and Latin America by Univision. The categories included were for the Pop, Tropical/Salsa, Regional Mexican and Music Video fields before the 2000 awards, from 2001 onwards categories were expanded and included a Rock field; for the Regional Mexican genre a Ranchera, Grupero, Tejano and Norteño fields were added; and Traditional, Merengue and Salsa performances were also considered in the Tropical/Salsa field. At the live show presentation, Spanish singer Enrique Iglesias debuted the music video of the song "Escape".

== Nominees and winners ==
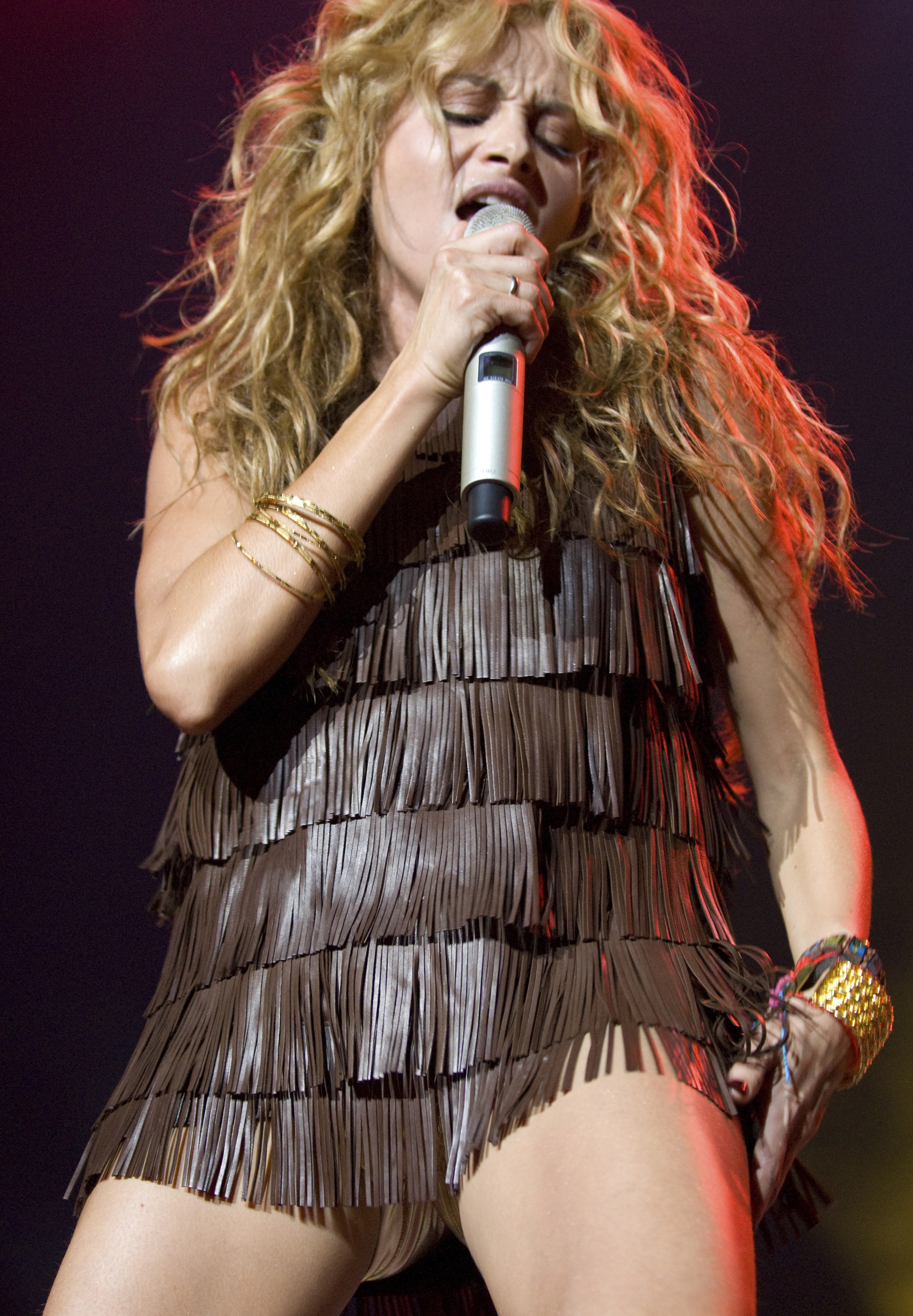
Mexican singer Paulina Rubio (pictured in 2007) won the Lo Nuestro Award for Pop Female Artist of the Year.

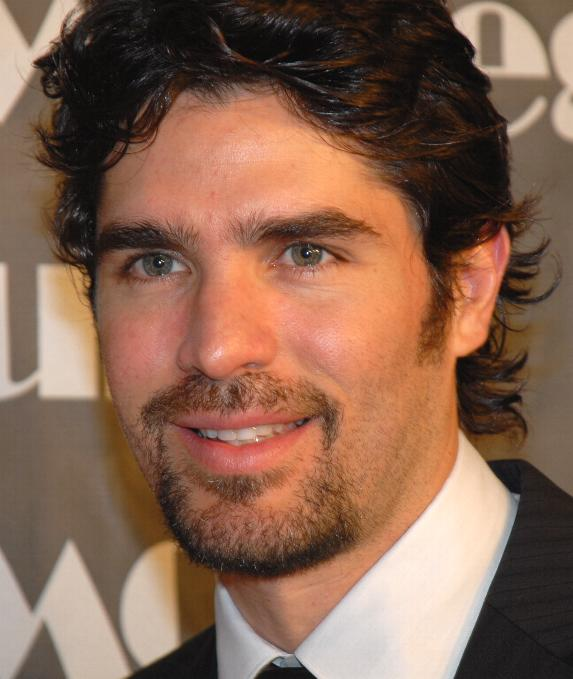
Mexican performer Eduardo Verástegui (pictured in 2008) was named Pop New Artist of the Year.

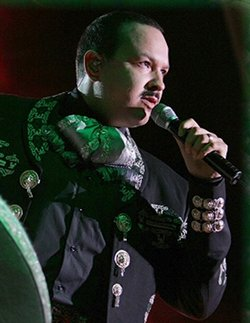
Singer-songwriter Pepe Aguilar (pictured in 2006) received the Ranchero Performance Award.

Winners were announced before the live audience during the ceremony. Puerto Rican American singer Olga Tañón was the most nominated performer and won her four nominations, including Tropical/Salsa Song of the Year for the single "Cómo Olvidar". Tañón also earned the "People Choice Award" in the Tropical/Salsa field for her album Yo Por Ti. Mexican singer-songwriter Juan Gabriel earned the accolade for Pop Album and Pop Song of the Year for "Abrázame Muy Fuerte", the best-performing Latin single of 2001 in the United States.

Mexican band Palomo won three awards in the Regional/Mexican field: Tejano Performance, Group and Song of the Year for the track "No Me Conoces Aún", which spent 31 weeks at number-one in the Billboard Regional Mexican Songs chart, the longest reign on any Nielsen Company BDS-based airplay chart in history. Colombian singer-songwriter Shakira was awarded the "People Choice" for Pop/Rock performance for her album Laundry Service; Mexican singer Thalía won for Regional/Mexican artist, and for the first time the Video of the Year was also selected by the audience and was awarded to Enrique Iglesias for "Héroe".

Nominees and winners of the 13th Annual Lo Nuestro Awards (winners listed first).

Pop Album	Pop Song
Juan Gabriel – Abrázame Muy Fuerte; Ricardo Arjona – Galería Caribe; Cristian Castro – Azul; Alejandro Fernández – Orígenes; Marco Antonio Solís – Más de Mi Alma; Jaci Velasquez – Mi Corazón	Juan Gabriel – "Abrázame Muy Fuerte"; Cristian Castro – "Azul"; Marco Antonio Solís – "O Me Voy o Te Vas"; Paulina Rubio – "Y Yo Sigo Aquí"; Jaci Velasquez – "Cómo Se Cura Una Herida"
Pop Male Artist	Pop Female Artist
Cristian Castro; Alejandro Fernández; Juan Gabriel; Marco Antonio Solís	Paulina Rubio; Christina Aguilera; Laura Pausini; Jaci Velasquez
Pop Duo or Group	Pop New Artist
OV7; MDO; Nydia Rojas and Juan Gabriel; Son by Four	Eduardo Verástegui; Alexandre Pires; Shalim; Tommy Torres
Rock Album	Rock Artist
La Ley – MTV Unplugged; Aterciopelados – Gozo Poderoso; El Gran Silencio – Chuntaros Radio Poder; Jaguares – Cuando la Sangre Galopa; Mœnia – Le Modulor	La Ley; Aterciopelados; Café Tacuba; El Gran Silencio; Jaguares
Regional Mexican Album	Regional Mexican Song
Lupillo Rivera – Despreciado; Pepe Aguilar – Me Vas a Extrañar; Conjunto Primavera – Ansia de Amar; Banda el Recodo – Contigo Por Siempre; Joan Sebastian – En Vivo	Palomo – "No Me Conoces Aún"; Pepe Aguilar – "Me Vas a Extrañar"; Vicente Fernández – "El Ayudante"; Lupillo Rivera – "Despreciado"; Los Tucanes de Tijuana – "El Amor Soñado"
Regional Mexican Male Artist	Regional Mexican Female Artist
Lupillo Rivera; Pepe Aguilar; Vicente Fernández; Joan Sebastian	Thalía; Graciela Beltrán; Rocío Dúrcal; Alicia Villarreal
Regional Mexican Group	New Regional Mexican Artist
Palomo; A.B. Quintanilla and Kumbia Kings; Banda el Recodo; Conjunto Primavera	Jessie Morales; Fato; Germán Román y su Banda República; Los Forasteros de San Luis
Tejano Performance	Grupero Performance
Intocable; A.B. Quintanilla and Kumbia Kings; Control; Bobby Pulido	Los Temerarios; Los Angeles Azules; Grupo Bryndis; Joan Sebastian
Ranchero Performance	Banda Performance
Pepe Aguilar; Vicente Fernández; Julio Preciado; Alicia Villarreal	Banda el Recodo; Banda Cuisillos; Banda Machos; Lupillo Rivera
Norteño Performance
Palomo; Conjunto Primavera; Los Tigres del Norte; Los Tucanes de Tijuana
Tropical Album	Tropical Song
Olga Tañón – Yo Por Ti; Elvis Crespo – Wow! Flash; Huey Dunbar – Yo Si Me Enamoré; Gilberto Santa Rosa – Intenso; Gilberto Santa Rosa – Romántico	Olga Tañón – "Cómo Olvidar"; Ilegales – "Tu Recuerdo"; Frankie Negrón – "Comerte a Besos"; Jerry Rivera – "Quiero"; Mickey Taveras – "Mi Historia Entre Tus Dedos"
Tropical Male Artist	Tropical Female Artist
Gilberto Santa Rosa; Frankie Negrón; Jerry Rivera; Eddie Santiago	Olga Tañón; Carolina la O; Melina León; Milly Quezada
Merengue Performance	Salsa Performance
Olga Tañón; Eddy Herrera; Fulanito; Grupo Manía; Milly Quezada	Gilberto Santa Rosa; Frankie Negrón; Jerry Rivera; Víctor Manuelle
Tropical Duo or Group	Tropical New Artist
Ilegales; Fulanito; Grupo Manía	Huey Dunbar; Jay Lozada; Ricardo y Alberto; Zona Prieta
Traditional Performance	Video of the Year
Alquimia; Antony Santos; Frank Reyes; Luis Vargas	Enrique Iglesias – "Héroe" (dir. Joseph Kahn); A.B. Quintanilla & Kumbia Kings – "Shhh!"; Alejandro Fernández – "Tantita Pena" (dir. Guillermo Trujillo); Juan Luis Guerra – "Quisiera" (dir. J. Basanta); Ricardo Montaner – "Bésame"; Celso Piña – "Cumbia Sobre el Río"; Paulina Rubio – "Y Yo Sigo Aquí" (dir. Gustavo Garzón); Thalía – "Amor a la Mexicana" (banda version) (dir. Emilio Estefan); Thalía – "Reencarnación" (dir. Emilio Estefan); Tranzas – "I Wanna Go" (dir. F. Arzate & León Chiprout)

== Special awards ==
- Lo Nuestro Excellence Award: José José
- Special tribute: Gilberto Santa Rosa
- People's Choice:
  - Pop/Rock: Shakira for Laundry Service
  - Tropical: Olga Tañón for Yo Por Ti
  - Regional/Mexican: Thalía

== See also ==
- 2001 in Latin music
- 2002 in Latin music
- Latin Grammy Awards of 2002
- Grammy Award for Best Latin Pop Album
