= Con Mis Propias Manos =

Studio album by Lupillo Rivera
- Released: May 25, 2004
- Genre: Banda
- Label: Univisión

Lupillo Rivera chronology
Pa' Corridos (2003)	Con Mis Propias Manos (2004)	Titanes del Corrido (2005)

Con Mis Propias Manos (Eng.: With My Own Hands) is the title of a studio album released by regional Mexican artist Lupillo Rivera. This album became his second number-one set on the Billboard Top Latin Albums. It garnered Rivera a Latin Grammy nomination for Best Banda Album at the 6th Annual Latin Grammy Awards.

== Track listing ==
The information from Billboard

=== CD ===
No.	Title	Writer(s)	Length
1.	"Que Tal Si Te Compro"	Cornelio Reyna	2:06
2.	"Laguna de Pesares"	Tomás Méndez	2:23
3.	"Con Mis Propias Manos"	Lamberto Olivo Alvarez	2:41
4.	"Los Chismes"	Ramón Ortega Contreras	2:39
5.	"Poco a Paco (Llegando a Tí)"	José Alfredo Jiménez	3:20
6.	"Los Pajaros"	Fernando Espinoza	2:48
7.	"Lo Que Sobran Son Mujeres"	Pedro Rivera	3:27
8.	"Navegando Sin Tu Amor"	Jiménez	2:47
9.	"Renunciación"	Herrera	3:01
10.	"En Mi Viejo San Juan"	Noel Estrada	2:57
11.	"Guantanamera"	José "Joseito" Fernández Díaz	2:55

=== DVD ===
This information from Allmusic.

No.	Title	Writer(s)	Length
1.	"Reportaje sobre su Accidente"
2.	"Tú y Las Nubes"	Jiménez	3:11
3.	"Veinte Mujeres"	Juan Villanueva	3:44
4.	"El Rayo de Sinaloa"	Paulino Vargas	2:53
5.	"El Moreño"	Luis Pérez Meza	2:54

== Chart performance ==
Chart (2004)	Peak position
US Billboard Top Latin Albums	1
US Billboard Regional/Mexican Albums	1
US Billboard Top Heatseekers	1
US Billboard 200	106

== Sales and certifications ==
Region	Certification	Certified units/sales
United States (RIAA)	2× Platinum (Latin)	200,000^{^}
^{^} Shipments figures based on certification alone.
