= Tu Esclavo y Amo =

Studio album by Lupillo Rivera
- Released: 2009
- Genre: Banda
- Label: Disa

Lupillo Rivera chronology
En Acustico (2008)	Tu Esclavo y Amo (2009)	Las 24 Horas (2010)

Tu Esclavo y Amo (Your Slave and Master) is a studio album released in 2009 by regional Mexican artist Lupillo Rivera. Tu Escalvo y Amo earned Rivera a Grammy award for Best Banda Album at the 52nd Annual Grammy Awards.

== Track listing ==
1. Angel Del Villar Aka El Corrido Del Villar
2. Con El Agua Hasta El Cuello
3. Narco Cholo
4. Epoca de Oro
5. Yo Se Que Soy Lo Peor
6. La Culebra
7. Esclavo y Amo
8. 50 Mil Rosas
9. Tu Traje Blanco
10. El Triste

== Chart performance ==
Chart (2009)	Peak position
U.S. Billboard Top Latin Albums	42
U.S. Billboard Regional Mexican Albums	18
