= El Tiro de Gracia =

Studio album by Lupillo Rivera
- Released: 2008
- Genre: Banda
- Label: Machete Music

Lupillo Rivera chronology
Desde una Fiesta Privada (2007)	El Tiro de Gracia (2008)	En Acustico (2009)

El Tiro de Gracia (The Shot of Grace) is a studio album released by in 2008 by regional Mexican artist Lupillo Rivera. El Tiro de Gracia garnered Rivera a Grammy nomination for Best Banda Album at the 51st Annual Grammy Awards.

== Track listing ==
1. De Que Me Presumes
2. Por Debajo del Agua
3. Dame
4. Ya Lo Se
5. Lo Raro Sería
6. La Vida Es un Papalote
7. Mi Corazón Ya Te Olvido
8. Por Cuantas Mentiras
9. Tiro de Gracia
10. Perdido en el Vicio
11. Gracias Por Haber Nacido
12. Frente de la Barra
13. La Fiesta Se Encuentra en Grande

== Chart performance ==
Chart (2008)	Peak position
U.S. Billboard Top Latin Albums	15
U.S. Billboard Regional Mexican Albums	5
