= Entre Copas y Botellas =

Studio album by Lupillo Rivera
- Released: 2006
- Genre: Banda
- Label: Universal Music Latin

Lupillo Rivera chronology
Pa' Corridos (2004)	Entre Copas y Botellas (2006)	Mi Homenaje a Pedro Infante (2007)

Entre Copas y Botellas (Between Drinks and Bottles) is a studio album released in 2006 by regional Mexican artist Lupillo Rivera. Entre Copas y Botellas garnered Rivera a Grammy nomination for Best Banda Album at the 50th Annual Grammy Awards.

== Track listing ==
1. Barrio Probre
2. Prefiero La Calle
3. La Interesada
4. El Galletero
5. Enseñame a Olvidar
6. Entre Copas y Botellas
7. La Diferencia
8. Indita Mia
9. Clave Privada
10. La Ruleta
11. Gerardo González

== Chart performance ==
Chart (2006)	Peak position
U.S. Billboard Top Latin Albums	14
U.S. Billboard Regional Mexican Albums	3

== Sales and certifications ==
Region	Certification	Certified units/sales
United States (RIAA)	Gold (Latin)	50,000^{^}
^{^} Shipments figures based on certification alone.
