= Despreciado =

Studio album by Lupillo Rivera
- Released: February 13, 2001
- Genre: Banda
- Label: Sony Discos

Lupillo Rivera chronology
El Toro del Corrido (2000)	Despreciado (2001)	Y Sigue La Vendimia (2001)

Despreciado (Eng.: Unappreciated) is the title of a studio album released in 2001 by regional Mexican artist Lupillo Rivera. This album became his first number-one album in the Billboard Top Latin Albums. It also won two Billboard Latin Music Awards in 2002. In the same year, it won the award for Regional Mexican Album of the Year at the 14th Lo Nuestro Awards ceremony.

== Track listing ==
This track listing from Billboard.com.

1. Tomando y Tomando (Martín Ruvalcaba) — 2:27
2. Despreciado (Juan Navarrete Curiel) — 2:50
3. Qué Te Ha Dado Esa Mujer (Gustavo Rivera) — 3:38
4. El Barzón (Miguel Muñiz) — 3:18
5. Tragos Amargos (Jesse Salcedo/F. Martínez) — 3:08
6. Copa Tras Copa (Rubén Méndez/Rubén Fuentes) — 2:00
7. Tu Recuerdo y Yo (José Alfredo Jiménez) — 2:56
8. Se Les Peló el Moreño (Lupillo Rivera) — 3:04
9. Mi Gusto Es (Dolores Ayala) — 3:30
10. Yo No Fuí (Consuelo Velázquez) — 2:39
11. Dedicatoria (Lupillo Rivera) — 1:04

== Credits ==
This information from Allmusic.

- Vicente Diarte: Arranger
- José Ángel Cabrera: Engineer, mixing
- Mario Bucio: Art direction

== Chart performance ==
Chart (2001)	Peak position
US Billboard Top Latin Albums	1
US Billboard Regional/Mexican Albums	1
US Billboard 200	163

== Sales and certifications ==
Region	Certification	Certified units/sales
United States (RIAA)	Gold	500,000^{^}
^{^} Shipments figures based on certification alone.
