= Lupillo Rivera =

American musical artist (born 1972)

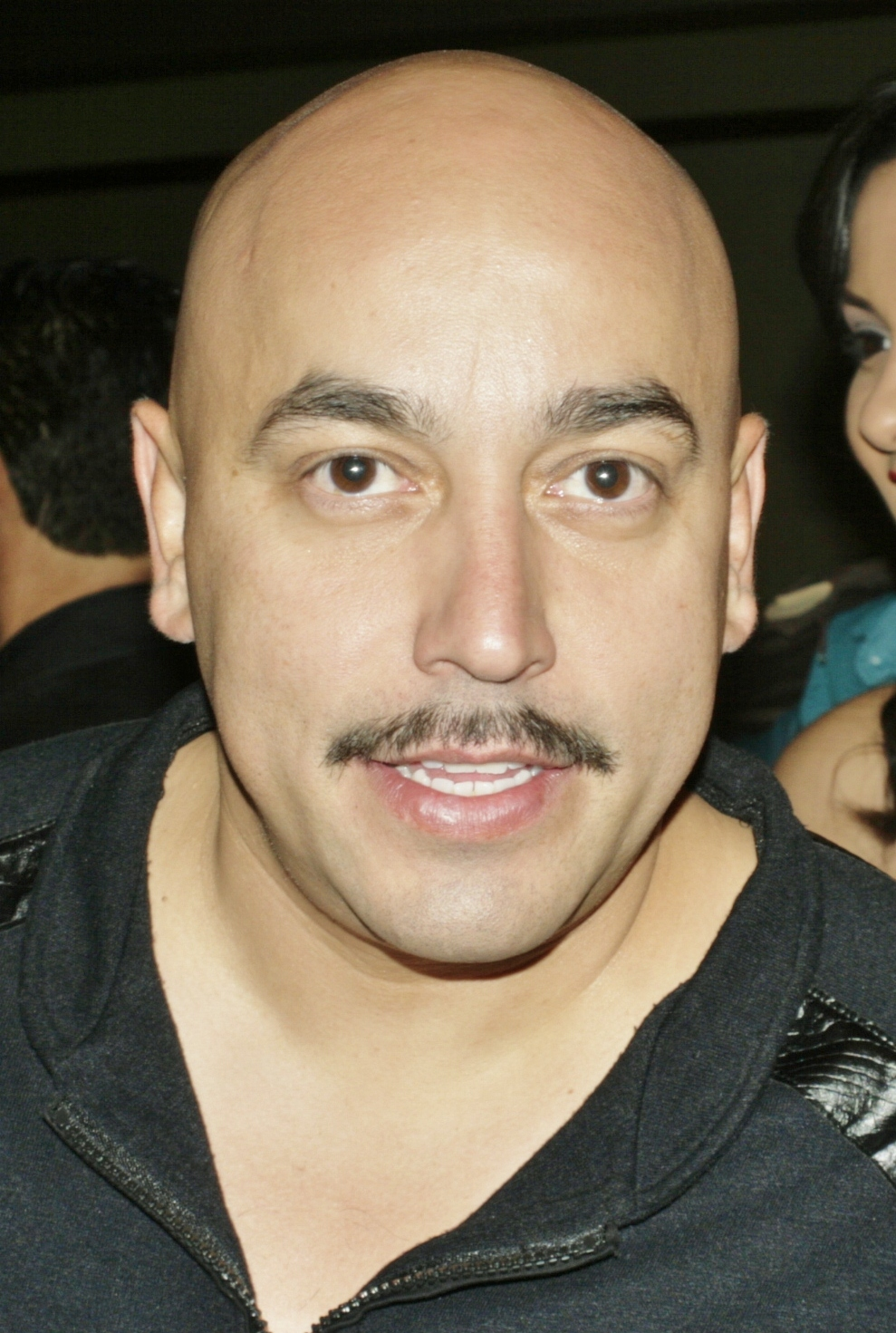
- Rivera at the 2013 Premios de la Radio

Background information
- Born: Guadalupe Rivera Saavedra; January 30, 1972 (age 54); Long Beach, California, U.S.
- Genre: Regional Mexican
- Occupations: Singer; songwriter
- Labels: Cintas Acuario; Sony Latin

Guadalupe Rivera Saavedra (born January 30, 1972) is a Mexican-American singer and songwriter. In 2010, Rivera was awarded a Grammy Award for his album, Tu Esclavo y Amo. His older sister was the late singer and actress Jenni Rivera. In 2019, he was one of the coaches for the first season of the Mexican singing competition show, La Voz on TV Azteca after being acquired from Televisa after seven seasons. He was a contestant at La Casa De Los Famosos 4 and at La Casa De los Famosos All Stars.

== Early life ==
Rivera was born in Long Beach, California to Rosa Saavedra and Pedro Rivera. Prior to Lupillo being born, Pedro Jr., Gustavo, his mother and his father moved to Long Beach, California, where Lupillo graduated from Long Beach Polytechnic High School in 1990.

== Career ==
Lupillo Rivera's journey into music was shaped by his early exposure to his father's record company, Cintas Acuario. Initially interested in becoming a restaurateur, he was instead drawn to the music industry. He worked at his father's studio, where his responsibilities included scouting and hiring local talent, providing him with invaluable real-world experience. Over time, Lupillo developed a deep passion for music.

Early in his career, he performed under the name "El Torito," but as his popularity grew, he changed it to "El Toro del Corrido" in homage to his uncle, the famous professional boxer El Toro Rivera. By 1999, he had settled on the stage name "Lupillo Rivera."

His career truly took off when he signed with Sony Discos. In 2001, his album Despreciado garnered him a Premio lo Nuestro and topped the Billboard Latin Albums chart. The following year, the album earned him two Billboard Latin Music Awards, and he made an appearance on the TV show Amorcito Corazón.

In 2004, Lupillo released Con Mis Propias Manos, which went on to become another chart-topping success. However, his 2009 album Tu Esclavo y Amo became his biggest hit, winning a Grammy Award for Best Banda Album in 2010. This album followed nominations for his previous works, Entre Copas y Botellas (2008) and El Tiro de Gracia (2009).

Since the release of his album 24 Horas in 2010, Lupillo has not dropped any new studio albums.

== Discography ==
- 1995 – Selena, La Estrella
- 1999 – El Moreno
- 1999 – Puros Corridos Macizos
- 2000 – El Toro de Corridos
- 2001 – El Señor de los Cielos
- 2001 – Y Sigue La Vendimia
- 2001 – Cartel de Tijuana
- 2001 – Veinte Mujeres
- 2001 – Despreciado
- 2001 – Sufriendo a Solas
- 2002 – Amorcito Corazón
- 2002 – Los Hermanos Más Buscados
- 2003 – De Bohemia con Lupillo Rivera
- 2004 – Con Mis Propias Manos
- 2004 – Pa' Corridos
- 2005 – El Rey de Las Cantinas
- 2006 – Entre Copas y Botellas
- 2007 – Mi Homenaje a Pedro Infante
- 2007 – Desde Una Fiesta Privada
- 2008 – En Acústico
- 2008 – El Tiro de Gracia
- 2009 – Tu Esclavo y Amo
- 2010 – 24 Horas

== Awards and nominations ==
=== Grammy Awards ===
The Grammy Awards are awarded annually by the National Academy of Recording Arts & Sciences in the United States. Rivera has received one award from three nominations.

Year	Nominee / work	Award	Result
2008	Entre Copas y Botellas	Best Banda Album	Nominated
2009	El Tiro de Gracia	Best Banda Album	Nominated
2010	Tu Esclavo y Amo	Best Banda Album	Won

=== Latin Grammy Awards ===
The Latin Grammy Awards are awarded annually by the Latin Academy of Recording Arts & Sciences in the United States. Rivera has received three nominations.

Year	Nominee / work	Award	Result
2004	Live! en Concierto – Universal Amphitheatre	Best Banda Album	Nominated
2005	Con Mis Propias Manos	Best Banda Album	Nominated
2006	El Rey de las Cantinas	Best Ranchero/Mariachi Album	Nominated

=== Lo Nuestro Awards ===
The Lo Nuestro Awards are awarded annually by the Spanish-language television network Univision in the United States. Rivera has received three awards from seven nominations.

Year	Nominee / work	Award	Result
2002	Lupillo Rivera	Regional Mexican Male Artist of the Year	Won
2002	Lupillo Rivera	Banda Artist of the Year	Won
2002	Despreciado	Regional Mexican Album of the Year	Won
2002	"Despreciado"	Regional Mexican Song of the Year	Nominated
2003	Lupillo Rivera	Regional Mexican Male Artist of the Year	Nominated
2003	Lupillo Rivera	Banda Artist of the Year	Nominated
2003	Amorcito Corazón	Regional Mexican Album of the Year	Nominated
