= No Me Sé Rajar =

Studio album by Banda el Recodo
- Released: July 30, 2002
- Recorded: 2001–2002
- Genre: Banda
- Label: Fonovisa
- Producer: Alfonso Lizárraga

Banda el Recodo chronology
Contigo Por Siempre (2001)	No Me Sé Rajar (2002)	Dos Grandes (2003)

No Me Sé Rajar (Eng.: I Do Not Know How to Give Up) is a studio album released by the Mexican banda ensemble Banda el Recodo. This album became their first number-one album in the Billboard Top Latin Albums chart and also received a nomination for a Grammy Award for Best Mexican/Mexican-American Album.

== Track listing ==
This information from Billboard.com

1. No Me Sé Rajar (José Carmen Frayle) — 2:54
2. Las Llaves de Mi Alma/Que Te Vaya Bonito (Vicente Fernández/José Alfredo Jiménez) — 3:46
3. Las Vías del Amor (Alfonso Lizarraga/Noe Hernández/Joel Lizarraga) — 3:32
4. La Muerte de un Gallero (Tomás Sosa Méndez) — 2:32
5. Acá Entre Nos (Martin Urieta) — 3:10
6. De Qué Manera Te Olvido/Lástima Que Seas Ajena (Federico Méndez/Jorge Massias) — 4:44
7. Si No Te Quisiera (Carlos José Reyes Hernández) — 3:04
8. Los Mandados (Jorge Lerma) — 2:26
9. Mujeres Divinas (Urieta) — 2:50
10. Yo Quiero Ser (Rosendo Montiel) — 3:47
11. Hermoso Cariño (Fernando Maldonado) — 2:12
12. Nos Estorbó la Ropa (Teodoro Bello) — 2:23
13. La Ley del Monte (José Ángel Espinoza Ferrusquilla) — 2:35
14. Las Vías del Amor (Club Mix) — 4:09
15. No Me Sé Rajar (Club Mix) — 3:28

== Personnel ==
This information from Allmusic.

- Alfonso Lizárraga — Arranger, producer, graphic design, art direction, concept
- La Banda el Recodo — Arranger
- Ezequiel Paez — Arranger
- Carlos Charlie Santana — Music Arranger Recording, mixing
- Carlos Luna — Recording, mixing
- Velarde Daly Lizárraga — Production assistant
- Noe Sepulveda — Production assistant
- Adolfo Pérez Butrón — Photography
- Eduardo Arias — Make-Up

== Chart performance ==
Chart (2002)	Peak position
US Billboard Top Latin Albums	1
US Billboard Regional/Mexican Albums	1
US Billboard Top Independent Albums	9

== Certifications and sales ==
Region	Certification	Certified units/sales
Mexico (AMPROFON)	Gold	250,000
United States	—	350,000
