= Tu Recuerdo (Ilegales song) =

2000 single by Ilegales

Single by Ilegales

from the album On Time
- Genre: Merengue, Latin pop
- Label: Ariola / RCA
- Composer: Vladimir Dotel

"Tu Recuerdo" (Your Memory) is a 2000 single by Ilegales composed by Vladimir Dotel from the album On Time. It was released in March 2001 and was No.14 on the Latin Pop Airplay on July 28 2001. The track featured on the multi-artist collections Verano 2001 (Ariola, 2001), Radio Hits..Es Musica! (EMI, 2001) and People en Espanol (WEA, 2002) as well as the Ilegales compilation The Best of Ilegales (RCA 2004). At the 2002 Lo Nuestro Awards ceremony, it received a nomination for Tropical Song of the Year.
