= Banda Machos =

Mexican band

- Also known as: La Reina De Las Bandas
- Origin: Villa Corona, Jalisco, Mexico
- Genre: Technobanda
- Years active: 1990–present
- Labels: MCM (1991-2006) (Today Warner Music), Sony Music (2007-present)
- Members: Alejandro Diaz; Arturo Avila; Agustín Mariscal; Leo Bueno; Mauricio Bueno; Efrain López; Brayan Alejandro Magaña; Javier Vidal; Carlos Calatayud; José Miguel Ojeda; Pablo Aguayo; Jonathan del Ángel; Ruben de Landa; Brandon Ortega Lead_vocalists: Raul Ortega (1990–1995, 2001), Jose Elpidio Morfin (1995–2000)
- Website: www.bandamachos.com.mx

Banda Machos is a regional Mexican band from Villa Corona, Jalisco.

The band specializes in the technobanda genre. They are best known for popularizing the quebradita dancing style that became popular in the 1990s in Mexico and the United States. Several of their songs are satirical, filled with sexual innuendos and of double entendres. Some of these include "Las Nachas", "Me Llamo Raquel", "La Manguera", and "La Secretaria". The band has been together for over 30 years and has recorded over 29 albums.

== History ==
=== Early years (1990–1992) ===
The band was formed in 1990 with 12 members. They recorded and released their first album, Serian Las Dos, on cassette the following year in 1991. Composed primarily of cumbias, rancheras and corridos, the band's debut achieved moderate success. In 1992, Banda Machos issued their second album, Casimira, with the title track, Leña De Pirul, La Culebra, Un Indio Quiere Llorar, No Soy Monedita De Oro, La Cosita and Traficantes Michoacanos becoming major hits. They also interpreted El Viejo Joven and Un Cariño Como Tu, both well known songs by Joan Sebastian.

=== Breakthrough success (1992–1995) ===
The band's breakthrough happened in 1992 following the release of their third album, Sangre De Indio which peaked at number 16 in the Mexican regional album chart This was in large part on the strength of Al Gato Y Al Raton, their biggest hit at the time. Other hits on the album were La Secretaria, Y La Quiere Paco, Escuadras Del Sur, Sangre De Indio, Volvere, Mi Tesoro and Chaparra De Mi Amor. In 1993, they released their fourth album, Los Machos Tambien Lloran. The album featured Guerita, Motivos, Mi Luna, Mi Estrella, Las Nachas, La Carga Del Diablo, Las Mañanitas and Tu Abandono, all of which were popular songs in Mexico and the United States. The album cover was the first to showcase the band's unique costumes that they gained recognition for. This production included the essential touch of their name by what many call "El Macho" consisting of a figure with a hat and suit. It is usually black, although it has changed color. Gracias Mujer was released in 1994. Hits on the album include Las Habas, La Más Bonita De Todas, El Puchoncito, Mi Otra Mitad, Esclavo y Amo and an interpretation of Bésame Mucho.

The band became known early on as "La Reina de las Bandas" (Queen of the Bands), both because of their unique costumes and their early contributions to the Quebradita genre.

=== Change in lineups and continued success (1995–2001) ===
During the early 1990s, the band's lead singer was Raúl Ortega, who after the release of Gracias Mujer attempted a solo career with his own band known as Banda Arre. Raul had little success with his solo adventure, so he decided to return to the band 2000–01. Machos released two albums, La Reunión and A Prueba De Balas upon his return. His return was short-lived, and soon after he left the band for good. During his absence, Raul was replaced by his student José (Pepé) Elpidio Morfin as lead vocalist. Mi Chica Ideal, released in 1995, had the singles Mi Chica Ideal, Usted, Ella, Te Lo Debo A Ti and Si La Miro Mañana, that dominated the charts. The album proved to be a hit in the quebradita scene and Machos’ success was far from over. In 1996, they followed up with Palabra De Machos. The majority of the album's success came from the singles Morenaza, Se Lo Dejo A Dios, Mala, Chiquita Bonita and Entre Perico Y Perico. The album's cover dubbed Banda Machos La Reina De Las Bandas (Queen of the Bands), a name that was given to the band. In 1997, their album Historia Sin Fin was released with great anticipation. The title track, Ya Lo Pagaras, Muevete, Tres Minutos, Me Canse De Ti and Sentimiento Navideño were the most popular songs on the album. The band continued releasing new material such as 1998's Vivir Sin Ella (which included Besame y Abrazame, Las Mafias del Norte and Sierras Milagrosas) and 1999's Rancheras De Oro. Rancheras De Oro featured En Toda La Chapa, No Compró Amores and Recuérdame Y Ven, the latter two having a music video. In the year 2000, Me Llamo Raquel, from their 11th studio album, Mi Guitarra Y Yo, took over radio airwaves in the United States and Latin America. Other songs on the album include Fracase, Si Los Caminos Hablaran, A Capa y Espada, Los Dos Zacatecanos, A Mover El Bote and Ya No Me Dejo. This album marked their 10th anniversary as a group and one of the last critically acclaimed releases. In that year during Mi Guitarra Y Yo’s promotional run, it became known that former vocalist Raul Ortega was returning to the Machos. As a result, the lead vocalist José Morfin, Mauricio Bueno & Bernando Lomeli opted to leave the band and formed Banda BM3.

=== Since 2001 ===
In 2002, they released a self-titled album with Eric Perez and Julio César Guerrero sharing lead vocals. It featured the hit, La Suegra. In 2003, Banda Machos released El Cantante Del Siglo Y La Reina De Las Bandas in honor of Pedro Infante. In 2004, the band released Pura Pasion, which featured Te Vas, La Manguera and La Noche Que Chicago Murió. Some time after, Alejandro Díaz joined Banda Machos and shared lead vocals with Julio César and in 2005, Banda Machos released Alma De Fuego. La Negra Le Pone was the lead single of the album. They celebrated their 15th year as band by performing for a live audience in Morelia. The entire performance was presented and is available on DVD. In early 2006, 20 Mil Heridas was released and nominated for a Grammy for Best Banda Album. Hits included 20 Mil Heridas, Regalenme Aire, Sueños Compartidos and Chivas Del Corazón. A Pesar De Todo was released in the spring of 2007. Songs on the album include the title track, Cuatro Meses, El Chubasco, Copa Tras Copa, El Día Que Me Muera and Entre Copa y Copa. In 2008, El Proximo Tonto, the band's 20th studio album in eighteen years, was released with the title track, La Novia Coja and No Hay Problema becoming hits. Banda Machos released Estas Seleccionada in 2009 with Arremángala Arrempújala as the lead single. Other songs that generated album sales are La Petacona and Te Lavaste La Cara Y El Mono No. Currently, the lead vocalists are Alejandro Díaz and Jonathan del Ángel. The back up singers are Rubén de Landa and Agustín Mariscal.

In 2012, a former Banda Machos member, Pepe Guardado, created a new band which emulated Banda Machos and called itself Banda Mach, an obvious attempt at copying Banda Machos style. They had some success, in part, because Raul Ortega, the original Banda Machos frontman, joined the project. As a result, Banda Machos sued to prevent the band from performing and recording. They succeeded in January 2020.

== Musical contributions ==
Along with Banda el Recodo, among other bands, they were responsible for constructing a more danceable style of traditional Banda music. This was the Quebradita style which essentially combined cumbia with banda.

== Awards and larger recognition ==
In 1993, Banda Machos was awarded by Univisión's Lo Nuestro for Revelation of the Year in the Mexican/Regional category, achieving a Furia Musical award for Best Mexican Band. Since then they have won Lo Nuestro Award for Banda Artist of the Year multiple times. They have also won multiple gold and platinum records. Banda Machos' "Zappa Mambo" was featured in the movie My Family, produced by Francis Ford Coppola in 1995.

== Social impact ==
One of the songs recorded by the band was "La Culebra" (The Snake), a cover of a Cuban song. This song was played during the campaign stop in which the PRI candidate to the Mexican Presidency in 1994, Luis Donaldo Colosio, was murdered. It is said that "La Culebra" was supposed to act as the signal to go ahead with the murder. The key stanza was where the song says "Ay, si me muerde los pies!, Yo la quiero acurruñar si me muerde los pies, Yo la tengo que matar". (If it bites my feet, I have to grab it, If it bites my feet, I have to kill it).

In the only video recording of the event, one can hear the song in the background as the gun approaches the candidate's temple.

Thanks to its album Sangre De Indio, Banda Machos was considered the creator of "The Ravine", a distinctive dance of the techno-band, as Jorge Luis Berdeja cited in an article in the Cultural section newspaper "El Universal" from Mexico in 1997, which refers to the band as an element of identity especially among Mexicans living in the United States.

== Discography ==
- Serían las Dos (1990)
- Casimira (1991)
- Sangre de Indio (1992)
- Los Machos También Lloran (1993)
- Gracias Mujer (1994)
- Mi Chica Ideal (1995)
- Palabra de Machos (1996)
- Historia Sin Fin (1997)
- Vivir Sin Ella (1998)
- Rancheras de Oro (1999)
- Mi Guitarra y Yo (2000)
- La Reunion (2001)
- A Prueba De Balas (2001)
- Banda Machos (2002)
- Pedro Infante el Cantante del Siglo y la Reina de las Bandas (2003)
- Pura Pasión 2004 (2004)
- Alma de Fuego (2005)
- 20 Mil Heridas (2006)
- A Pesar de Todo (2007)
- El Próximo Tonto (2008)
- Estás Seleccionada (2009)
- 20 Anos de Exitos En Vivo (2010)
- Si Volveria A Nacer (2013)
- 25 Aniversario: Una Leyenda Viviente (2015)
- La Huella De Tus Besos (2017)
