= Julio Preciado =

Mexican banda singer

Julio Preciado is a banda singer based in Mazatlán, Sinaloa, Mexico. His music is based on norteño songs. Los Cadetes de Linares was a notable source of inspiration. Sometimes, his music includes accordions in addition to brass instrumentation. Preciado was previously the lead vocalist of Banda El Recodo. He has aired on a Mexican television show called Cantando Por Un Sueño, as well as sang with a mariachi band on the 2001 album Entre Amigos.

== See also ==
- Banda El Recodo
- El Coyote
