= Larry Hernández =

Mexican-American singer songwriter

- Born: March 10, 1977 (age 49); Los Angeles, California, United States
- Origin: Culiacán, Sinaloa, Mexico
- Genres: Regional Mexican
- Occupations: Singer, songwriter, television personality
- Instruments: Voice, drummer, accordion
- Years active: 1994–present
- Label: Universal Music Latin Entertainment (Present)

Larry Hernández
- Height: 5 ft 7 in (170 cm)

Larry Hernández (born March 10, 1977) is a Mexican-American singer songwriter and television personality known for his work in the regional Mexican music genre, specifically in the styles of banda, Pacific norteño and norteño-banda. Hernandez's biggest influence and idol is the late Chalino Sanchez, but he also feels admiration for many artists and his musical influences have a big range. He is a distant cousin of fellow regional Mexican artist El Potro de Sinaloa.

Hernández lived in Los Angeles until he was four when his family moved to Culiacán, Sinaloa, Mexico. He spent most of his adolescence there before starting his musical career. He currently lives in unincorporated Covina Hills, California.

== Early life ==
At the age of four, Hernandez's parents took him to a small town called Pueblos Unidos-Estación Opispo, in Culiacán, where he grew up for most of his adolescence. At a young age, Hernandez had musical aspirations. At the age of eight, he would compose his own corridos and play them to all of his family members in order to learn from their critiques. Hernandez's musical influence came from his family, but he taught himself how to write and compose songs. To help with his music career, Hernandez attended a music school in Culiacán, where he played for a group of musicians who represented Sinaloa called Los Amables del Norte. He would soon join the band as their drummer. Performing with Los Amables del Norte gave Hernandez experience playing in front of a crowd, but it was his solo career that sparked his fame.

== Music career ==
=== Early ===
In 1998, Hernandez conducted his first recordings which were composed of 65 songs in a tribute to Cornelio Reyna. Later, in 1999, Hernandez recorded his first solo album, "Contella Norteña." Afterwards, Hernandez recorded eight more albums; "Mil Noches" in 2001, "El Amigo de Todos" in 2003, "Linda Chuiquilla" in 2004, "Labrinto" and "Arrepiente" in 2005, "Se Busca Cantar Buenos Corridos" in 2006, and "Hace un Mes" and "Dejate Querer Tantito" in 2008. It wasn’t until 2009 when Hernandez's fame became elevated with his release of "16 Narco Corridos," which only took Hernandez one day to record, hitting the top billboard charts, and reaching the rank of number four on the Billboard Top Latin Albums. After the release of this album, Hernandez's musical career began to rise.

=== Contemporary (2009 to present) ===
With the release of the "16 Narco Corridos," Hernandez became a mainstream Latino artist. The record sold over 300,000 albums, boosting Hernandez's career. The album was written almost entirely by Hernandez and recorded in a single day. The album features vivid depictions of drug trafficking culture and it reached the top number four spot on Billboard Top Latin Albums chart. His album "En Vivo: Desde Culiacán" followed later in 2009 and climbed to the number two spot on Billboard Top Latin Albums confirming his status as a Latino star. Some people have criticized his lyrics, to which he replied, "My 'corridos' aren't made to start controversy with anyone, they are made to entertain people, so they drink and have a good time. In reality, the economy and the whole world are going through tough times; the only thing I can give people is my talent and a good time so they forget everything and enjoy themselves." Although in his career as a soloist he recorded seven albums without major recognition, his musical catalyst occurred by means of social networking and through viral YouTube response which his fans supported. The public that already knew of him began to talk about him on internet blogs and music based websites, and upload his music videos. With the increase in his following, he was converted into a true Latino music idol. His fame then caught the attention of large music industry record labels and he signed a contract with the transnational record label Universal Music Latin Entertainment which has helped him continue his successful career and led to the transition to other avenues of mass media.

== Larrymania ==
On October 7, 2012, Larrymania aired for the first time on Mun2. Larrymania is an original reality TV. Larrymania gives Hernandez's fans an opportunity to see how he is able to maneuver his life through the tough obstacles that a music superstar has to undergo. The show has already shown popularity among Hernandez's fans as it has reached over 58,000 "likes" on Facebook. Produced by Cinemat.

== Arrest ==
On September 25, 2015, Hernandez was arrested in Ontario, California, on charges of kidnapping and assault. The charges are related to an incident that occurred in Newberry, South Carolina on August 16, 2015, after a performance. Allegedly, Hernandez was not happy with his payment for the performance, and he and another man assaulted a friend of the performance organizer. They then forced him to Hernandez's hotel room and continued the assault in an attempt to gain more money from the organizer. The victim was eventually able to escape. Extradition has occurred as of October 15, 2015 to South Carolina. On October 23, 2015, Hernandez was taken in front of a judge in South Carolina. Bail was set at $200,000 and he was ordered to surrender his passport. Bail was paid and he was released until his next court date. On October 24, 2016, Hernandez came to an agreement with the victim and pled guilty to disorderly conduct. He was sentenced to six months of probation, and will have to make monetary restitution to the victim, the exact amount of which was yet to be determined.

== Music videos ==
Larry Hernandez has recorded hundreds of songs, but his popularity rose due to his fans internet activity more so than because of his radio listeners. Hernandez has uploaded eight music videos on his YouTube channel (), where he has millions of views. In a profile created for Larry Hernandez on VEVO, one can find eight music videos by Hernandez. The music video "El Baleado" alone has over 55 million views and many more videos surpassing the 1 million view mark.

- El Baleado (Nov 22, 2009)
- Division MP (February 10, 2012)
- Arrastrando Las Patas (January 24, 2011)
- El Ardido (July 5, 2011)
- Sin Ganas De Cenar (Version Nortena) (August 21, 2012)
- Sin Ganas De Cenar (Version Banda) (August 21, 2012)
- Mas Que Suerte (December 17, 2012)
- Dame Tu Amor (April 1, 2013).
- Ojalá Que Te Vaya Mal (March 18, 2014
- Vete Acostumbrando (April 17, 2015) Director Carlos D. Chavez
- Quien Fue (Deciembre 4, 2015) Director Carlos D Chavez

== Awards and nominations ==
2010 Latin Billboard Music Awards

- Won Latin Artist of the year, New
- Nominated Regional Mexican Album of the Year
- Nominated Regional Mexican Albums Artist of the Year, Solo

2011 Latin Billboard Music Awards

- Nominated Hot Latin Songs Artist of the Year, Male
- Nominated Top Latin Albums Artist of the Year, Male
- Won Regional Mexican Airplay Artist of the Year, Solo
- Won Regional Mexican Albums Artist of the Year, Solo

2011 Premio Lo Nuestro Awards

- Nominated Male Artist of the Year Regional Mexican Music

2012 Latin Billboard Music Awards

- Nominated Regional Mexican Songs Artist of the Year, Solo
- Nominated Regional Mexican Albums Artist of the Year, Solo

2012 Premio Lo Nuestro Awards

- Won Regional Mexican Banda Artist of the Year
- Nominated Premio Lo Nuestro Artist of the Year
- Nominated Regional Mexican Song of the Year
- Nominated Regional Mexican Artist of the Year, Male

2013 Latin Billboard Music Awards

- Nominated Mexican Songs Artist of the Year, Solo
- Nominated Regional Mexican Albums Artist of the Year, Solo

2015 Premios juventud

- Nominated Regional Mexican Song of the Year
- Nominated Regional Mexican Artist of the Year

2015 Premios Banda Max

- Nominated For Best Duet Song Of the Year With "El Kommander" And Won For Most Influence Artist of social Media of the Year

2015 Premios De La Radio

- Nominated For Male Artist Of The Year and nominated for the most glued on social network

== Discography ==
- Mil Botellas (1998)
- Sentella Norteña (1999)
- El Colombiano (2000)
- Mil Noches (2001)
- El Cerillazo (2002)
- El Amigo de Todos (2003)
- Linda Chuiguilla (2004)
- Labrinto (2005)
- Arrepiente (2005)
- Se Busca Cantar Buenos Corridos (2006)
- Dejate Querer Tantito (2008)
- Hace Un Mes (2008)
- Aca Entre Nos (2009)
- En Vivo Desde Culiacan (2009)
- 16 Narco Corridos (2009)
- El Baleado-Live (2009)
- Puros Toques-Live (2010)
- LarryMania (2010)
- La Historia De Los Excitos. (2010)
- Larryvolucion (2012)
- Capaz de Todo (2012)
- 20 Excitos De Collecion (2013)
- 20 Kilates (2014)
- Otra vez en la lista negra (2014)
- Lo Mejor De Larry Hernandez (2014)
- 16 Narcos Corridos Volumen 2 (2015)
- Vete Acostumbrando (2015)
- Vete Acostumbrando Deluxe Edition (2015)
- Lo Blanco y Lo Negro de Mi Vida (2017)

Corridos de Mafia, Volumen 1 (2020)
