= El Potro de Sinaloa =

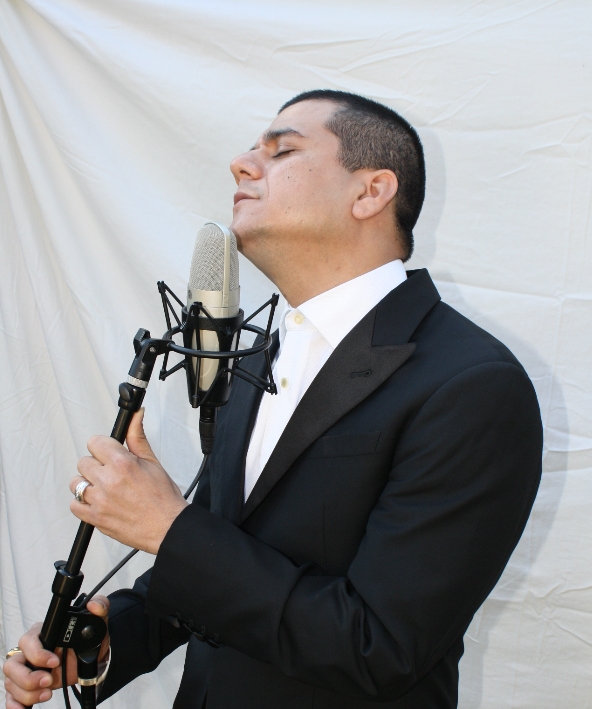
- Sin Fronteras

Background information
- Born: 17 November 1978 (age 47); Culiacán, Sinaloa, Mexico
- Origin: Culiacán, Sinaloa, Mexico
- Genres: Regional Mexican
- Occupations: Singer, songwriter
- Instrument: Vocals
- Years active: 1990–present
- Labels: Machete Music; Fonovisa; Universal Music Latin Entertainment; Afinarte Music

José Eulogio Hernández, better known by his stage name El Potro de Sinaloa, is a regional Mexican singer, specializing in the styles of banda and Pacific norteño.

Both of his brothers, Ignacio and Tomas, had careers as musicians in Mexico. Fellow regional Mexican artist Larry Hernández is his distant cousin. Early in his career, he adopted his stage name (which means "the colt of Sinaloa"), and became a popular performer throughout the country. In 1996, he signed with Sony Records; he later recorded for EMI and then Lideres, a Universal Records subsidiary. In 2007, he was nominated for a Grammy award.

== Discography ==
- Con los Caballeros (Linda, 1995)
- Potrillos (Linda, 1995)
- Puñales de Fuego (Sony Records, 1996, 1997 Disa Records, Mexico)
- Que Bonito Es el Amor (EMI, 1998, Disa Records, Mexico)
- Pobre de Mi Corazon (Lideres, 2001)
- Mi Corazon Ya Te Olvido (Lideres, 2002)
- Dos Amores (Veranito, 2005)
- No Me Quites Tu Amor (Machete Music, 2007)
- El Primer Tiempo (Machete, 2007)
- Me Caiste del Cielo (Veranito, 2007)
- Los Mejores Corridos Vol.1 (Machete, 2007)
- Los Mejores Corridos Vol.2 (Machete, 2007)
- Grandes Exitos Originales (Machete, 2008)
- Dejame Vacio (Fonovisa Records, 2008)
- Cargamento Del Diablo (2009)
- Narco Edicion (2009)
- Serie Diamante: 30 Super Exitos (2009)
- El Enemigo Publico (2010)
- Sin Fronteras (Universal Latin Music Entertainment 2012)
- Jerarquia De Corridos' con Power Sinaloense (2014)
- A Mi Estilo (2014)
- El Maz Poderoso ( Refuego Music 2015)
- Romantico y Cachondo (Music Eyes 2017)
- El Solicitado- Single (Afinarte Music 2017)
- En Vivo Desde Culiacan con Servando ZL (Refuego Music, 2017)
- Y Sigue La Mata Dando (Afinarte Music 2018)
- Pa’ Destapar la Hielera (En Vivo) EP (Afinarte Music 2018)
- El Picos Single (Refuego Music 2018)
- Tiro de Gracia Single (Afinarte Music 2019)
- El Solicitado Single (Afinarte Music 2019)
- El Compa Many (En Vivo) - Single (Afinarte Music 2019)
- Juegos de Poderes Single (Afinarte Music 2019)
- Déjame (Refuego Music 2019)
- Anoche Sone Contigo (Afinarte Music, 2019)
- Por Cristo Vivo (Version Norteño) Single (Refuego Music, 2019)
- Ni por todas las Estrellas - Single (En Vivo) (Afinarte, 2020)
- Gajes del Oficio (Refuego Music 2021)
- Seguimos Galopando - Single (Refuego Music, 2021)
- Al Millon Y Medio Y Pasaditooo – Single (Refuego Music, 2021)
- En Vivo desde Culiacan (En Vivo desde Culiacan) (Refuego Music, 2021)
- El Peor de Tus Antojos ft Los Amables del Norte (Refuego Music, 2021)
- En Vivo desde Las Tapias (Refuego Music, 2021)
- Con Esencia Ranchera (Refuego Music, 2021)
- En el Rancho en Vivo y A todo Color – Single (Refuego Music, 2021)
- Mi Mayor Riqueza (En Vivo) – Single (Refuego Music, 2021)
- El que Anda en El Dorado (En Vivo, 2022)
- Hay Nomas pa Las Cocas (En Vivo) (Refuego Music, 2022)
- La Vieja Escuela (En Vivo) Ft Mimoso, El Frizian, Lobito (Music VIP, 2023)
- Cada Dia Mas - Single (2023)
- El Potro de Sinaloa y Grupo Principal en Vivo (Refuego Music 2023)
- Corridos Que Huelen a Monte! (Refuego Music 2024)
- Tambora Va A Sonar – Single (2024)
- Quierro Olvidarla (En Vivo) – Single (Refuego Music 2024)
- El Afamado - Single (Refuego Music, 2024)
- La Neta te Falle – Single (Refuego Music, 2024)
- El Deseoso (En Vivo) - Single (Refuego Music, 2024)
- Corridos Y Canciones El Potro de Sinaloa, Vol.1 (En Vivo) (Refuego Music 2024)

== Awards and nominations ==
2007 50th Annual Grammy Awards

- Nominated Regional Mexican Album of the Year

=== 2007 Premios de La Radio ===
- Won Regional Mexican Artist of the Year, Male
- Won Regional Mexican Best Corrido of the Year

2008 Latin Billboard Music Awards

- Nominated Regional Mexican Airplay Song of the Year, Male Solo

2008 Premios de La Radio

- Won Regional Mexican Artist of the Year, Male

2009 Premio Lo Nuestro Awards

- Nominated Regional Mexican Banda Artist of the Year
- Nominated Regional Mexican Artist of the Year, Male

2010 BMI Latin Awards Award-Winning Songs

- Déjame Vacio Juan José Leyva Juan Diego Sandoval Editora Arpa Musical El Potro de Sinaloa Fonovisa Records
