= Banda Cuisillos =

Mexican regional band

- Also known as: Banda Cuisillos de Arturo Macías; Cuisillos de Arturo Macías
- Origin: Cuisillos, Jalisco, Mexico
- Genre: Banda
- Years active: 1987–present
- Label: Musart
- Past members: Ramiro Cuarenta; Bruno de Jesús; Ernesto Ruíz

Banda Cuisillos de Arturo Macías, or simply Banda Cuisillos, are a Mexican banda group from the city of Cuisillos, Jalisco. They are well known for wearing Native American costumes in their stage performances and album photographs as a tribute to their ethnic heritage. Also, unlike most brass bandas, they incorporate a piano and electric guitar into some of their songs.

== History ==
The band was formed in 1987 by Arturo Macías, a clarinetist, who was still a teenager at the time. He invited several of his friends to join in his project, and they had to work hard to buy all the instruments. The original name of the group was Banda Cuisillos Musical de Arturo Macías. In 1993, they recorded their self-titled debut album, which contained their first big hit, "El Perro Aguayo". Perhaps the most notable aspect of the group at this time was their youth; most of the band members were still only in their early 20s. In contrast with their later heavily balada-based sound, this first album was composed primarily of cumbias.

1994 brought their second album "Las Mil Y Una Noches" with the title track being the major hit. In 1995, they released their third album, "Déjate Llevar". With this album, they dropped the word "musical" from their band name and became known as Banda Cuisillos de Arturo Macías. The first single was the charanga "Déjate Llevar", but the big hit became the second single, "Déjame Entrar", a balada. It was around this time that the band began experimenting with different costumes, although they still had not finalized wearing the Native American costumes for which they are famous.

Their fourth album, 1996's "Como Sufro," was the band's first gold record, selling more than 100,000 copies. This production also brought major changes: the band began wearing Native American costumes full-time in their performances and on album covers. Also, former vocalist Ramiro Cuarenta left the band before the recording of this album and was replaced by Bruno de Jesús (Cuisillos name was Voz de Trueno), who left the band in early 2009. Their big hit was the title track, a ballad.

1997's "Te Amo" was, up to that point, the band's biggest selling album, earning the band another gold record. Three of the four singles from this album were ballads: "Te Quiero", "Te Amo", and "¿Por Que Te Fuiste?" (The third single, Muñequita, was a cumbia.) Due to the huge success they were having with their ballads, the band decided to start focusing more on ballads and less on cumbias, which had been the mainstays of their albums up to this point.

To date, the band's sixth album "Acuérdate de Mi!" is the band's second-biggest selling album of all time, earning the band double gold status (meaning more than 200,000 copies were sold in the United States). Major changes on this album included more ballads (six out of the twelve tracks on this album are ballads) as well as the inclusion of electric guitar and a drum kit. Also, the band again changed their name, this time dropping the word "banda" to become simply Cuisillos de Arturo Macías, the name by which they are still known to this day. The major singles were "Acuérdate De Mi", "Ya No Me Mires Así" and "Es Amor Lo Que Hay En Ti".

Their seventh album, "A Veces Lloro", released in 1999, is still the band's biggest selling and only platinum album. The major hit was the title track. This was followed up by "Hasta La Eternidad" in 1999, which would be the band's final gold record for seven years, which contained the big hit "No Se Lo Digas A Ella".

In 2007, Cuisillos made their comeback to massive popularity due to the title track from their 21st album, "Mil Heridas," written by Espinoza Paz, which became a huge hit in the United States and Mexico. As a result, Mil Heridas became the band's first gold disc in seven years. Five out of twelve tracks were written by popular songwriter Espinoza Paz, and it is believed this is the reason for the album's huge success.

On April 29, 2008, Cuisillos released their 22nd album, "Vive y Déjame Vivir" and on April 2, 2009, they released their 23rd album, " Vientos De Cambio."

On October 12, 2017, Ernesto Ruíz, a vocalist of the band, was murdered.

== Albums ==
- Tengo Mi Novia en Cuisillos (1989)
- 15 super exitos (1992)
- El Perro Aguayo (1993)
- Las Mil y Una Noches (1994)
- Déjate Llevar (1995 - first Album with Musart)
- Como Sufro (1996)
- Te Amo (1997)
- Acuérdate De Mí (1998)
- A Veces Lloro (1999)
- Hasta la Eternidad (1999)
- Despertando Una Leyenda (2000)
- Puras Rancheras (2001)
- Nuevos Horizontes (2001)
- Homenaje a Joan Sebastian (2002)
- No Voy a Llorar (2002)
- Corazón (2003)
- Mas Allá de la Nada (2004)
- Luz y Vida del Nuevo Milenio (2004)
- El Concierto del Amor (2005)
- Descontrolado (2005)
- Rancherísimo (2006)
- Amor Gitano (2006)
- Mil Heridas (2007)
- Vive y Déjame Vivir (2008)
- Vientos de Cambio (2009)
- Caricias Compradas (2010)
- Para Siempre (2011)
- 2012: Fin y Principio de Una Era (2012)
- Te Esperaré (2014 - released under FONO)
- Siempre Amor (2014)
- Cerveza (2015)
- Por Siempre Romántico (2015 - last Album with Musart)
- Dos Botellas (2016)
- Mexicanisimo (2019)
- Mis Mejores Deseos (2024)
- Cómo Quieres Que Esté (2025)
- Leyendas del Principio (En Vivo Desde Ciudad de México) (2025)
- Legado: Colección 1 (Regrabado) (2026)
- Legado: Colección 2 (Regrabado) (2026)
- Legado: Colección 3 (Regrabado) (2026)
