= Banda el Recodo =

Mexican musical group

Banda Sinaloense El Recodo de Cruz Lizárraga
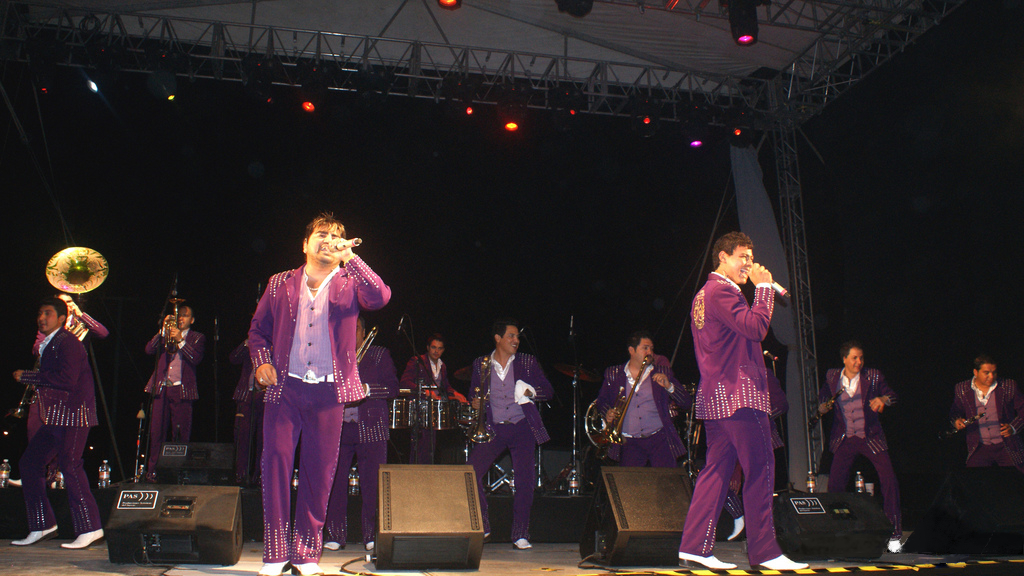
- Banda El Recodo tocando en Cancún

Background information
- Origin: El Recodo, Sinaloa
- Years active: 1938–present
- Labels: RCA Victor (1951–1991); Musivisa (1991–1998); Universal/Fonovisa Records (1996–present)
- Members: Luis Alfonso Lizárraga Lizárraga (clarinet and musical director) (1990–present) Joel David Lizárraga Lizárraga (clarinet) (2001–present); Jusús Bernardo Osuna Ostos (clarinet); Jorge Alberto López Montoya (clarinet); Jesús Geovanni Mondragon Vidriales (vocals) (2012–present); Ricardo Yocupicio Ulloa (vocals) (2018–present); Mario Alvarado Villaseñor (trumpet); Jesús Abel Moreno Romero (trumpet); Jesús Omar Rodríguez Orrante (trumpet); Omar David Castro Cuadras (trombone); Oscar Álvarez Otañez (trombone); Luis Fernando Ibarra Gallardo (trombone); Víctor Alfonso Sarabia Huitrón (tambora); Josue Dueñas Mejía (snare drum); Gustavo Pimentel Leal (tenor horn); Gabino López Esquerra (tenor horn) Edilberto Moreno García (sousaphone)
- Past members: Conrado Calderón (vocals) (1989–1991) Julio Preciado (vocals) (1991–1998); Germán Lizárraga (clarinet) (1958–2002); Luis Antonio López "El Mimoso" (vocals) (1998–2009); Carlos Sarabia (vocals) (1998–2003); Alejandro Ojeda (vocals) (2003–2007); Alejandro Villarreal "El Borrego" (vocals) (2003–2007); Noé Obeso Félix (vocals); Luis Alfonso Partida "El Yaki" (vocals) (2008–2012) Carlos (Charly) Pérez (vocals) (2009–2018)
- Website: bandaelrecodo.com.mx

Banda Sinaloense El Recodo de Cruz Lizárraga, often referred to simply as Banda El Recodo, is a Mexican banda formed in Mazatlán, Sinaloa, in 1938. It has been under the direction of the Lizárraga family. Banda El Recodo has recorded with popular artists such as José Alfredo Jiménez and Juan Gabriel.

The ensemble consists of four clarinets, three trumpets, a tambora, a snare drum set with cowbells and cymbals, a sousaphone, three trombones, two tenor horns (referred to as saxores, armonías or charchetas in Mexico), and two vocalists.

== History ==
Banda El Recodo was founded by Cruz Lizárraga, a young musician who also gave it its current appearance, including the setting, style, shape and number of current members that associated it with the place of their origin, the State of Sinaloa on the Mexican Pacific. El Recodo was named after the town Lizárraga was born in.

In 1989, Banda El Recodo officially incorporated a vocalist into their line-up. Prior to this year, Banda El Recodo and most other brass bandas recorded almost exclusively instrumentals. Banda El Recodo had previously provided the music on certain albums for solo artists such as José Alfredo Jiménez and Manolo Velarde.

They were the first Mexican brass banda to perform in Europe, Asia, Africa, Australia, North and South America.

They were also the first Mexican band to play in the US State of Hawaii.

On 17 June 1995, Banda El Recodo's founder, Cruz Lizárraga, died in Mazatlán after a long illness, at age 76. Banda El Recodo was touring in Europe at the time of his death.

They are the only band to win the Latin Grammy nine times. In 2003, Banda El Recodo became the first Mexican band to be invited to perform at the Latin Grammy Awards, repeating their performance in 2008, 2010, 2015 and 2017, which made them the Mexican band with the most participation in these awards.

They have received 12 "Premios Lo Nuestro" in their career, becoming the band with more awards in its genre.

They are winners of five Billboard Awards throughout their career in the categories "Album of the Year," "Song of the Year" and "Master Tone."

They are five-time winners of Premios Oye.

They are winners of Premios Bandamax, where they also received the special award "Productor y Visionario de La Música Regional."

In 1999, Banda El Recodo performed at the Plaza de Toros México in Mexico City, which was attended by over 50,000 fans. Tickets were sold out three days prior to their performance.

In 2000, Banda El Recodo gathered 135,000 people at Mexico City's Zócalo.

In 2003, Banda El Recodo performed three consecutive sold-out days at the Auditorio Nacional in Mexico City.

In 2004, Banda El Recodo became the first band to be invited to perform at the White House in front of United States President George W. Bush, during the festivities of Cinco de Mayo. That same year, they performed once again at the Zócalo of Mexico City before more than 100,000 people.

Banda El Recodo has been the only band that has attended four FIFA World Cups (Japan 2002, Germany 2006, South Africa 2010 and Russia 2018) to support the Mexican national soccer team with their music during the official games.

In 2006, Banda El Recodo participated in Televisa's soap opera La Fea Más Bella, where they also sang the closing theme song.

Banda El Recodo made a small appearance in Hollywood cinema for the first time in the movie Babel, which was directed by Alejandro González Iñárritu, who decided to use their song "La Fea."

In 2007, Banda El Recodo's music appeared again in a Hollywood film. Their song "Qué Te Ruegue Quien Te Quiera" was used in one of the scenes of the movie Rocky Balboa.

9 October 2008 was immortalized as the day of the Banda El Recodo and the day of Cruz Lizárraga, in the city of Las Vegas, Nevada. On this day, they were awarded with two stars on the Las Vegas Walk of Stars (one for Banda El Recodo and another for its founder, Cruz Lizárraga).

In 2013, Banda El Recodo released their production No. 200 "Haciendo Historia." On 14 October 2014, 50-year-old trumpeter Aldo Sarabia went missing for over a week. On 22 October, he was found dead. Authorities said Sarabia was shot in the neck and had been punched several times. The Attorney General of Sinaloa, Marco Antonio Higuera Gómez, announced that Sarabia was murdered by his wife, Alma Delia Chávez Guerrero, and her lover, Jair Alfredo Sandoval Estrada. Sarabia's funeral was held on 23 October 2014 and he was cremated.

In 2015, Banda El Recodo's single "Todo Tuyo" was the opening theme song for the soap opera Mi Corazón Es Tuyo, which attained the highest ratings for El Canal de las Estrellas. Through this new single, the band created a great campaign in social media which no other band had ever done before. The campaign consisted of celebrities and thousands of fans posting a photo simulating the figure of a heart with their hands. This caused great commotion amongst social media users and thousands of retweets that made the band and its campaign a Twitter trend.

Banda El Recodo surprised once again on 19 July 2015, by performing in Madrid, Spain. Cruz Lizárraga once said: "I will not cease until the music of Banda El Recodo is heard throughout all the world," and this performance in Spain made that dream a reality once again. Two thousand people gathered at the Circo Price in Madrid to dance, sing and delight themselves with every song of Banda El Recodo. These were also the songs that several years prior had taken them to the Old Continent before any other banda. That night was full of surprises, which included a duet with David Bustamante, a prominent singer in Spain.

In February 2016, Banda El Recodo made history once again by touring in Guatemala. Thousands of Guatemalans awaited anxiously to sing and dance with the sound of the 'tambora.' In April 2016, Banda El Recodo broke a record of attendance at the "Semana Internacional de La Moto." They proved that their music has no barriers or borders, and that it goes beyond trends, by having a great acceptance from the 'bikers.'

Banda El Recodo made it to Nicaragua in 2016, with two large shows in "La Plaza Taurina Humberto E Isabel Mungrio" in Juigalpa and another one in the "Estadio Noel Gamez" in the city of Estelí. More than 16 thousand people gathered to once again make the dream of their founder, Cruz Lizárraga a reality to continue touring to take their music to every possible place in the world.

Also in 2016, Banda El Recodo presented their record production Raíces, an album of nostalgia in which Poncho and Joel Lizárraga, along with the rest of the members of Banda El Recodo, tried with all their pride to bring to the new generations the old notes that their father directed for several years. These notes were brought to life with new musical arrangements, maintaining the essence that led Cruz Lizárraga to position himself as the leader of the genre. Cruz Lizárraga started his career playing in fairs, and then joined international artists who already had a name in the musical industry. These artists saw Banda El Recodo as the way to become known within the banda's music.

In August 2016, their Raíces album took over the No. 1 position of the Regional Mexican chart of the Billboard magazine and No. 2 of Latin album charts.

In September 2016, Banda El Recodo had great success by transcending borders thanks to their great effort and work to look for innovative ways to present new music. Proof of it was their song "Las Fresas" featuring the singer Wisin. This song placed for many consecutive weeks in the first place of Chile's important popularity charts.

In November 2016, Banda El Recodo took their music to Chile for the first time. They stayed in Santiago de Chile for four days, where they visited several radio stations: Radio Corazón and Radio Carolina, where they were very excited and anxious to have in their facilities for the first time a Mexican band visiting Chile. Banda El Recodo also made a Facebook Live with the newspaper La Cuarta, where they played a couple of hits, among them "Las Fresas." Banda El Recodo also performed at the television program "Mucho Gusto," the most important morning show in the country. The band was an absolute success with the audience. The production received so many calls from the audience that they ended up performing four songs instead of only one total, which no artist had ever gotten to do in that program.

The magazine Lideres Mexicanos celebrates its 25th anniversary, and in their special edition of November, this renowned magazine dedicated for the first time six pages to a worthy representative of Sinaloa's music: Alfonso Lizárraga. People had the opportunity to know more about Alfonso's background, which also served an opportunity for him to share a message of leadership, promoting the culture and effort, work, trust of ideals and the highest human values. Alfonso is very clear on these and has them very present in his daily life, which has led him to be both one of the leaders of Banda El Recodo and a great Mexican leader.

Banda El Recodo closed 2016 with great news. The band recorded a song composed by Mario Quintero Lara, which was used as the main song of the Telemundo series El Chema. The soundtrack tells the story of this controversial character in recent times.

2016 was a big year for Banda El Recodo. The band was nominated for the sixth time for an American Grammy. Their successful album Raíces took them to their ninth Latin Grammy. In 2016, they also achieved enormous popularity with the songs "Mujer Mujer" and "Vale la Pena."

Banda El Recodo started off 2017 with the release of the single "Me Prometí Olvidarte," a 'ranchera' song that talks about deception, anger and lack of love.

To close 2017, Banda El Recodo won their 10th Latin Grammy, in the "Best Banda Album" category for their album Ayer y Hoy. Aside from celebrating their win, the band performed completely live on stage at the Latin Grammy 2017, a medley that included the songs "En Mi Viejo San Juan" and "Viva Mexico." This was a tribute to both Puerto Rico and Mexico, who had been recently affected by severe natural disasters. For this medley, the band was joined by the Mexican singer Lila Downs, who, like Banda El Recodo, has been a precursor of Mexican music and culture throughout the world.

On top of continuing weekly with their tour of shows throughout Mexico and the United States, Banda El Recodo created the festivities that mark the 80th anniversary of the creation of "La Madre de Todas Las Bandas," which was celebrated in mid-2018.

In July 2020, Banda el Recodo inaugurates the new Estadio de Mazatlán, home of the soccer team Mazatlán F.C. that plays in the Primera División de México and it became one of the team's sponsors, portraying the band's name in the game uniforms.

== Current lineup (2018–present) ==
- Luis Alfonso Lizárraga Lizárraga (clarinet and musical director) (1990–present)
- Joel David Lizárraga Lizárraga (clarinet) (2001–present)
- Jesús Bernardo Osuna Ostos (clarinet)
- Jorge Alberto López Montoya (clarinet)
- Jesús Geovanni Mondragon Vidriales (vocals) (2012–present)
- Ricardo Yocupicio Ulloa (vocals) (2018–present)
- Mario Alvarado Villaseñor (trumpet)
- Jesús Abel Moreno Romero (trumpet)
- Jesús Omar Rodríguez Orrante (trumpet)
- Omar David Castro Cuadras (trombone)
- Oscar Álvarez Otañez (trombone)
- Luis Fernando Ibarra Gallardo (trombone)
- Victor Alfonso Sarabia Huitrón (tambora)
- Josue Dueñas Mejía (snare drum)
- Gustavo Pimentel Leal (tenor horn)
- Gabino López Esquerra (tenor horn)
- Edilberto Moreno García (sousaphone)

== Discography ==
- Banda El Recodo (1958)
- Que Siga La Tambora (1963)
- Los Invito a Mazatlán (1967)
- José Alfredo Jiménez canta al Recodo (1969)
- La Mejor Tambora del Mundo (1975)
- El Sinaloense (1979)
- Banda El Recodo Vol. II (1981)
- A Bailar con El Recodo (1985)
- El Alma de Sinaloa (1986)
- El Apartamento (1990)
- Ahora Mejor Que Nunca (1991)
- La Número Uno... Ahora Con Puras Rancheras (1991)
- 13 Rancheras y Cumbias (1992)
- El Bato Machín (1992)
- La Pelea del Siglo (1992)
- Serie 20 Exitos (1992)
- 16 Rancheras y Cumbias (1993)
- Pegando con Tubo (1994)
- Picosito y Ranchero (1994)
- De México y Para el Mundo (1995)
- Pa' Puros Compas: Por Una Mujer Casada y Otras Rancheras (1995)

== Discography with Fonovisa ==
- Desde el Cielo y Para Siempre (1996)
- Tributo a Juan Gabriel (1996)
- De Parranda con la Banda (1997)
- Histórico: Banda el Recodo En Vivo (1997)
- Tengo una Ilusión (60 Aniversario) (1998)
- Lo Mejor de Mi Vida (1999)
- La Historia la Escriben los Grandes... Plaza de Toros México (En Vivo) (2000)
- Contigo por Siempre... (2001)
- No Me Sé Rajar (2002)
- Por Ti (2003)
- En Vivo Ciudad de México-Auditorio Nacional (2004)
- Hay Amor (2005)
- A Las Mujeres Que Amé (2006)
- Más Fuerte Que Nunca (2006)
- Que Bonito.. ¡Es lo Bonito! (2007)
- Te Presumo (2008)
- La Historia de los Éxitos (2009)
- Me Gusta Todo de Tí (2009)
- Las Número Uno (2010)
- Vive Grupero El Concierto ( 2010 )
- La Mejor de Todas (2011)
- Haciendo Historia (2013)
- Mi Vicio Más Grande (2015)
- Raíces (2016)
- Ayer y Hoy (2017)
- 80 Años de Musica Entre Amigos (2018)
- Sones Raíces (2021)
- Esta Vida es Muy Bonita (2021)

== See also ==
- Julio Preciado
- Banda music
- List of best-selling Latin music artists
- Music of Mexico
- Regional Mexican music
- Grammy Award for Best Banda Album
- Latin Grammy Award for Best Banda Album
