= El Chapo de Sinaloa =

Singer, songwriter and actor from Mexico

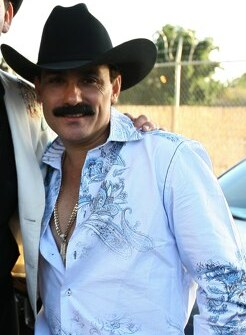

Background information
- Born: Ernesto Pérez; October 23, 1964 (age 61)
- Origin: Badiraguato, Sinaloa, Mexico
- Genres: Regional Mexican
- Occupations: Singer, songwriter, actor
- Years active: 1995–present: Singer, songwriter 2016–present: Actor
- Labels: Paloma Records, Luz Record
- Website: www.elchapooficial.com

Ernesto Pérez (born 23 October 1964 in Badiraguato, Sinaloa, Mexico) better known by his stage name El Chapo de Sinaloa (Spanish: The Shorty from Sinaloa), is a regional Mexican singer and actor. He started out professionally as a norteño singer, but has since been primarily focused with banda, as well as some mariachi songs.

He first played with local groups at age 11 as a clarinetist. Later, he learned to play bass, and found work as a session musician with regional Mexican labels. In the 1990s he signed with EMI Latin and launched a solo career. Since then he has released over a dozen albums, which have been successful both in Mexico and the United States; he has recorded for Sony and Disa. His 2007 album Te Va a Gustar was his most successful in the United States and was nominated for a Latin Grammy.

== Discography ==
- 13 Toneladas (1996)
- Chapo de Sinaloa (1996)
- Padre de Todos (1999)
- Tienda Surtida (1999)
- Me Dicen el Rey (2000)
- Andamos Borrachos Todos (2000)
- Que Tal Si Te Compro (2001)
- El #1 del Jaripeo (2002)
- Hechizo de Amor: Cien Por Ciento Norteño (2002)
- 15 Exitos al Estilo Norteño (2002)
- Fantasia Loca (2003)
- Tu, Yo y la Luna (2004)
- La Noche Perfecta (2006)
- Los Super Corridos (2006)
- El Jaripeo (2006)
- Los Mejores Corridos del Chapo de Sinaloa con Banda (2006)
- Con Banda Sinaloense 20 Exitos (2006)
- Recostada en la Cama y Muchos Exitos Mas (2006)
- Sus 12 Mejores Corridos (2006)
- Te Va a Gustar (2007) U.S.#95
- Mis Rancheras Consentidas (2007)
- Para Siempre (2008)
- Corridos Ke Mandan (2008)
- Exitos de Siempre (2009)
- Con la Fuerza del Corrido (2009)
- Apasionado (2010)
- Corazon de niño (2011)
- Triunfador (2012)

== Filmography ==
=== Film ===
- Emilia Perez (2024) Gustavo Brun

=== Television ===
- Sueño de amor (2016) Jerónimo Durán
