= Ana Bárbara discography =

- Studio albums: 11
- Compilation albums: 18
- Singles: 37
- Music videos: 33

The discography of Mexican pop singer Ana Bárbara consists of 11 studio albums, 18 compilation albums, 37 singles, and 33 music videos.

== Albums ==
=== Studio albums ===
Title	Details
Ana Bárbara	Released: September 23, 1994; Label: Fonovisa; Format: CD
La Trampa	Released: July 18, 1995; Label: Fonovisa; Format: CD
Ay, Amor	Released: 1996; Label: Fonovisa; Format: CD
Los Besos No se Dan en la Camisa	Released:November 24, 1997; Label: Fonovisa; Format: CD
Tu Decisión	Released: 1999; Label: Fonovisa; Format: CD
Te Regalo la Lluvia	Released: 2001; Label: Fonovisa; Format: CD
Te Atraparé... Bandido	Released: September 23, 2003; Label: Fonovisa; Format: CD
Loca de Amar	Released: October 26, 2004; Label: Fonovisa; Format: CD
No es Brujería	Released: May 2, 2006; Label: Fonovisa; Format: CD
Rompiendo Cadenas	Released: November 10, 2009; Label: AB Productions; Format: CD, digital download
Yo Soy la Mujer	Released: July 12, 2013; Label: Sony Music Latin; Format: CD, digital download, streaming

=== Compilation albums ===
Title	Details	Certifications
Lo Mejor de Ana Bárbara: En la Monumental Plaza México	Released: September 16, 1997; Label: Fonovisa; Format: CD	
Hacia en Milenio	Released: 1999; Label: Fonovisa; Format: CD	
15 Exitos	Released: April 23, 2002; Label: Fonovisa; Format: CD	
Una Mujer, Un Sueño	Released: June 15, 2004; Label: Fonovisa; Format: CD	RIAA: Platinum (Latin)
Dos en Uno	Released: November 22, 2005; Label: Fonovisa; Format: CD	
Divas Gruperas	With: Alicia Villarreal; Label: Fonovisa; Released: 2005; Format: CD	
Reynas Gruperas	With: Prisila y Sus Balas de Plata; Label: Fonovisa; Released: 2005; Format: CD	
Confesiones	With: Jennifer Peña; Label: Fonovisa; Released: March 22, 2005; Format: CD	
Dos Historias	With: Selena; Label: EMI/Fonovisa; Released: February 28, 2006; Format: CD	
Más Confesiones	With: Jennifer Peña; Label: Fonovisa; Released: April 4, 2006; Format: CD	
La Trampa y Muchos Éxitos Más	Released: August 15, 2006; Label: Fonovisa; Format: CD	
Para Ti... Mi Historia	Released: November 7, 2006; Label: Fonovisa; Format: CD	
La Mejor Seleccion	Released: February 13, 2007; Label: Fonovisa; Format: CD	
En Familia	With: Los Elegidos; Label: Fonovisa; Released: April 3, 2007; Format: CD	
Partes de Mi Vida	Released: July 22, 2008; Label: Fonovisa; Format: CD	
La Historia: Mis Éxitos	Released: October 7, 2008; Label: Fonovisa, Universal Latino; Format: CD	
Voz y Figura: 20 Éxitos w/ DVD	Released: 2009; Label: Fonovisa, Universal Latino; Format: CD, DVD	
Mi Colección	Released: 2012; Label: Fonovisa; Format: CD, digital download, streaming	

== Singles ==
Title	Year	Album
"Nada"	1994	Ana Bárbara
"Sacúdeme"	1994	Ana Bárbara
"Todo Lo Aprendí de Ti"	1994	Ana Bárbara
"La Trampa"	1995	La Trampa
"No Sé Que Voy Hacer"	1995	La Trampa
"Me Asusta, Pero Me Gusta"	1996	La Trampa
"Dame Un Beso En Nochebuena"	1996	Navidad Con Amigos
"Ya No Te Creo Nada"	1996	Ay, Amor
"No Lloraré"	1996	Ay, Amor
"Y Siempre"	1996	Ay, Amor
"Los Besos No Se Dan En La Camisa"	1997	Los Besos No Se Dan En La Camisa
"Como Me Haces Falta"	1997	Los Besos No Se Dan En La Camisa
"Qué Saben?" (with Marco Antonio Solis)	1997	Los Besos No Se Dan En La Camisa
"Engañada"	1999	Tu Decisión
"Quise Olvidar"	1999	Tu Decisión
"Todo Contigo"	1999	Tu Decisión
"Eso No Es De Hombres"	2001	Te Regalo La Lluvia
"Te Regalo La Lluvia"	2001	Te Regalo La Lluvia
"Bailaré	2001	Te Regalo La Lluvia
"Bandido"	2003	Te Atraparé... Bandido
"Deja" (Versión Pop)	2003	Te Atraparé... Bandido
"Cosas del Amor" (with Yuri)	2003	Te Atraparé... Bandido
"Loca"	2005	Loca de Amar
"Lo Busqué"	2005	Loca de Amar
"No Fue Casualidad" (Feat. Reyli Barba)	2005	Loca de Amar
"Estar a Tu Lado" (Feat. Arthur Hanlon)	2005	Loca de Amar
"No Es Brujería"	2006	No Es Brujería
"Vete" (Versión Banda)	2006	No Es Brujería
"Con Mis Propias Manos" (with Pablo Montero)	2006	No Es Brujería
"Rompiendo Cadenas" (Feat. Dyland & Lenny)	2009	Rompiendo Cadenas
"Que Ironía" (Versión Rock)	2009	Rompiendo Cadenas
"Ahora Tengo" (with Reyli Barba)	2009	Rompiendo Cadenas
"Alma Perdida"	2010	Mujeres Asesinas 3
"Suerte"	2011	Una Familia Con Suerte
"Tu Ingratitud"	2014	Yo Soy la Mujer
"Ahora Me Toca a Mí" (Banda, Pop, and Cumbia Versión)	2014	Yo Soy la Mujer
"A Donde Crees Que Vas"	2014	Yo Soy la Mujer
"Por Ese Hombre" (with La Original Banda El Limón & Marcos Llunas)	2015	Yo Soy la Mujer

== Guest appearances ==
List of guest appearances, showing year released and other performing artists
Title	Year	Other artist(s)	Album
"Rumores"	2002	Joan Sebastian	El Club de Tus Amigos Te Cantan a Ti Joan Sebastia
"Cosas Del Amor"	2004	Yuri	Yuri [2004]
"Estar a Tu Lado"	2005	Arthur Hanlon	La Gorda Linda
"La Martina"	2005	Los Elegidos	Tal y Como Somos
"Con Mis Propias Manos"	2006	Pablo Montero	Que Bonita Es Mi Tierra... y Sus Canciones
"Ahora Tengo"	2011	Reily	Bien Acompañado
"Enamorado Y Sin Ti"	2020	Grupo Cañaveral De Humberto Pabón	Enamorado Y Sin Ti
"Capullo Y Sorullo"	2020	La Sonora Dinamita	Transformando la Cumbia

== Production and songwriting credits and vocal contributions ==
Song	Year	Artist(s)	Credit(s)
"Fruta Prohibida"	2005	Norteños de Ojinaga	Composer
"Dime"	2005	Los Elegidos	Composer
"Lo Busque"	2007	La Bandita de Durango	Composer
"Compass"	2015	Camilo Lara, & Toy Selectah	Vocals, Collaboration

== Music videos ==
Title	Year
"La Trampa"	1995
"Me Asusta Pero Me Gusta"	1995
"Ya No Te Creo Nada"	1996
"Como Me Haces Falta"	1997
"Mala"	1998
"Engañada" (Original & Remix Versión)	1999
"Quise Olvidar"	2000
"Eso No Es De Hombres"	2001
"El Ultimo Adios (The Last Goodbye)" (Various Artists)	2001
"Te Regalo La Lluvia"	2002
"Bandido"	2003
"Deja" (Pop Versión)	2004
"Loca"	2005
"Lo Busqué"	2005
"Arriba, Arriba"	2006
"Estar a Tu Lado" (Feat. Arthur Hanlon)	2006
"No Es Brujería" (Pop Versión)	2006
"Rompiendo Cadenas"	2009
"Somos El Mundo" (Various Artists)	2010
"Que Ironía" (Versión Rock)	2010
"Ahora Tengo" (US and México Versión)	2010
"Alma Perdida"	2011
"Refugio Para El Amor"	2011
"Tu Ingratitud"	2012
"Don Cheto: Ganga Style" (Cameo)	2012
"Yo Ya No Estoy"	2013
"Yo Soy La Mujer"	2013
"Ahora Me Toca a Mí" (Original, Pop, and Cumbia Versión)	2013
"Tengo Ganas" (Original and Cumbia Versión)	2014
"Niña de Mis Ojos (Feat. K’ala Marka)	2014
"Por Ese Hombre (Feat. La Original Banda El Limón)	2015
"Que Poca"	2019
"Para No Extrañarte Tanto"	2020
