= Lo Nuestro Award for Mexican Music Female Artist of the Year =

Latin music award

Lo Nuestro Awards for Mexican Music Female Artist of the Year
- Awarded for: Mexican Music Female Artist of the Year
- Country: United States
- Presented by: Univision
- First award: 1992

Highlights
- Most awards: Jenni Rivera (9)
- Most nominations: Graciela Beltrán and Jenni Rivera (10)
- Website: univision.com/premiolonuestro

The Lo Nuestro Award for Mexican Music Female Artist of the Year is an award presented annually by American network Univision.The accolade was established to recognize the most talented performers of Latin music. The nominees and winners were originally selected by a voting poll, conducted among program directors of Spanish-language radio stations in the United States and also based on chart performance on Billboard Latin music charts, with the results being tabulated and certified by the accounting firm Deloitte. At the present time, the winners are selected by the audience through an online survey. The trophy awarded is shaped in the form of a treble clef.

The award was first presented to Mexican singer Ana Gabriel in 1992. Mexican-American performer Jenni Rivera holds the record for the most awards with nine, out of ten nominations. Mexican singer Graciela Beltrán is the most nominated performer without a win, with ten unsuccessful nominations.

In 2017, the award was not included in the categories and was combined with the Mexican Music Male Artist of the Year. In 2023 it was split up again. In 2025 the award was renamed to the Mexican Music Female Artist of the Year.

== Winners and nominees ==
Listed below are the winners of the award for each year, as well as the other nominees for the majority of the years awarded.

Key	Meaning
‡	Indicates the winner

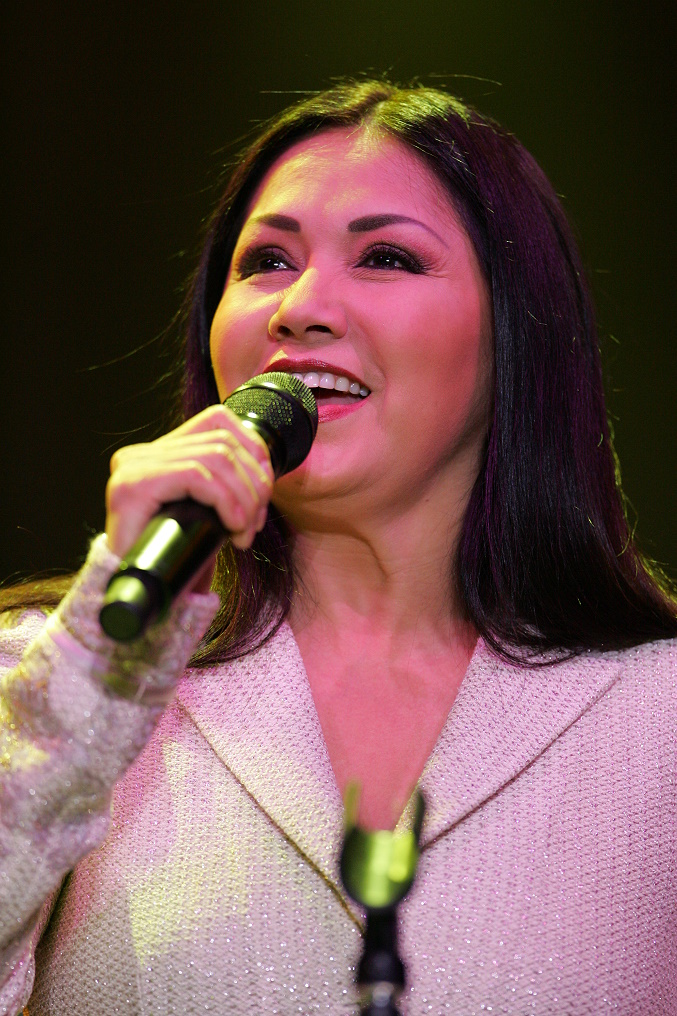
Mexican singer Ana Gabriel (pictured in 2006), winner in 1992, 1999, and 2000

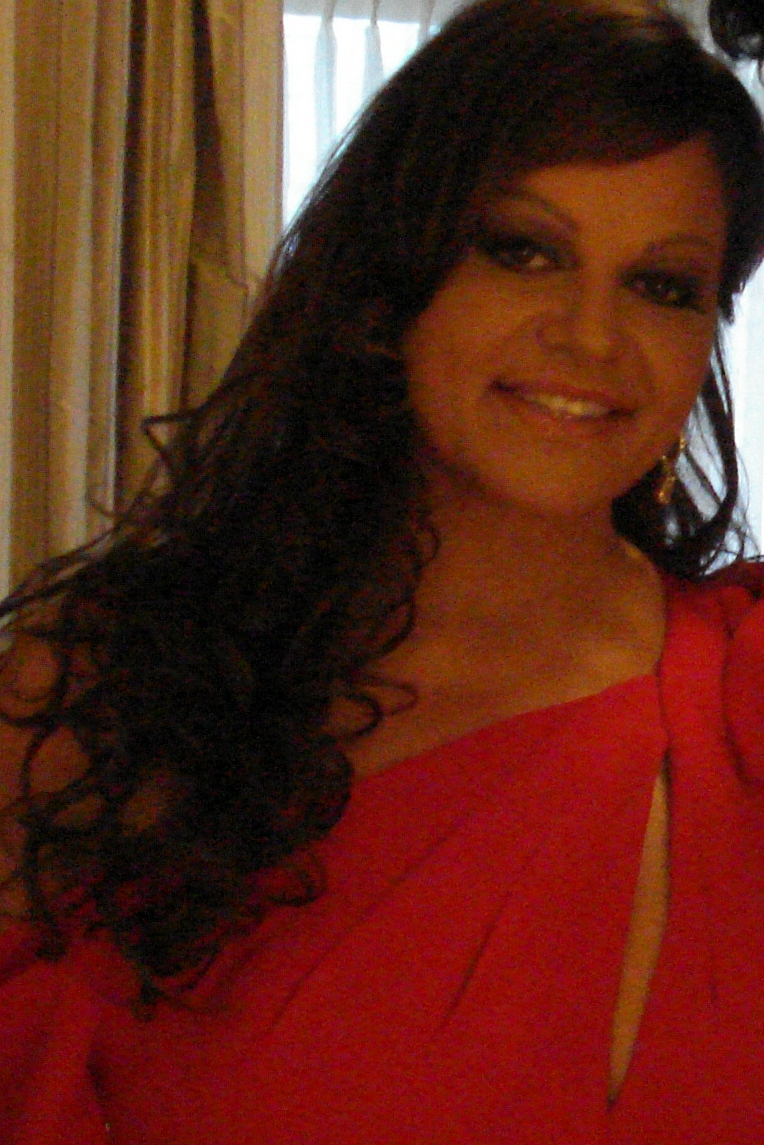
Mexican-American singer Jenni Rivera (pictured in 2008), the most awarded performer with nine wins, consecutively for nine years in a row (2007-2015)

Year	Performer	Ref
1992 (4th)	Ana Gabriel ‡	
1992 (4th)	Rocío Banquells	
1992 (4th)	Linda Ronstadt	
1992 (4th)	Selena	
1993 (5th)	Selena ‡	
1993 (5th)	Ana Gabriel	
1993 (5th)	Lucero	
1993 (5th)	Linda Ronstadt	
1994 (6th)	Selena ‡	
1994 (6th)	Elsa García	
1994 (6th)	Laura León	
1994 (6th)	Linda Ronstadt	
1995 (7th)	Selena ‡	
1995 (7th)	Lucero	
1995 (7th)	Ana Gabriel	
1995 (7th)	Ana Bárbara	
1996 (8th)	Ana Bárbara ‡	
1996 (8th)	Graciela Beltrán	
1996 (8th)	Nydia Rojas	
1996 (8th)	Laura Flores	
1997 (9th)	Ana Bárbara ‡	
1997 (9th)	Graciela Beltrán	
1997 (9th)	Nydia Rojas	
1997 (9th)	Laura Flores	
1998 (10th)	Ana Bárbara ‡	
1998 (10th)	Nydia Rojas	
1998 (10th)	Ana Gabriel	
1998 (10th)	Yaesenia Flores	
1999 (11th)	Ana Gabriel ‡	
1999 (11th)	Graciela Beltrán	
1999 (11th)	Ana Bárbara	
1999 (11th)	Yaesenia Flores	
2000 (12th)	Ana Gabriel ‡	
2000 (12th)	Ana Bárbara	
2000 (12th)	Graciela Beltrán	
2000 (12th)	Paquita la del Barrio	
2000 (12th)	Yaesenia Flores	
2001 (13th)	Paquita la del Barrio ‡	
2001 (13th)	Carmen Jara	
2001 (13th)	Patricia Navidad	
2001 (13th)	Yolanda del Río	
2002 (14th)	Thalía ‡	
2002 (14th)	Alicia Villarreal	
2002 (14th)	Graciela Beltrán	
2002 (14th)	Rocío Dúrcal	
2003 (15th)	Pilar Montenegro ‡	
2003 (15th)	Aracely Arámbula	
2003 (15th)	Jenni Rivera	
2003 (15th)	Paquita la del Barrio	
2004 (16th)	Jennifer Peña ‡	
2004 (16th)	Ninel Conde	
2004 (16th)	Marisela	
2004 (16th)	Graciela Beltrán	
2005 (17th)	Alicia Villareal ‡	
2005 (17th)	Mariana Seoane	
2005 (17th)	Ninel Conde	
2005 (17th)	Paquita la del Barrio	
2006 (18th)	Ana Bárbara ‡	
2006 (18th)	Ely Quintero	
2006 (18th)	Diana Reyes	
2006 (18th)	Isabela	
2006 (18th)	Mariana	
2007 (19th)	Jenni Rivera ‡	
2007 (19th)	Alicia Villarreal	
2007 (19th)	Diana Reyes	
2007 (19th)	Graciela Beltrán	
2008 (20th)	Jenni Rivera ‡	
2008 (20th)	Alicia Villarreal	
2008 (20th)	Diana Reyes	
2008 (20th)	Graciela Beltrán	
2009 (21st)	Jenni Rivera ‡	
2009 (21st)	Isabela	
2009 (21st)	Diana Reyes	
2009 (21st)	Graciela Beltrán	
2010 (22nd)	Jenni Rivera ‡	
2010 (22nd)	Alicia Villarreal	
2010 (22nd)	Diana Reyes	
2010 (22nd)	Paquita la del Barrio	
2010 (22nd)	Luz Ríos	
2011 (23rd)	Jenni Rivera ‡	
2011 (23rd)	Diana Reyes	
2011 (23rd)	Shaila Dúrcal	
2011 (23rd)	Ely Quintero	
2012 (24th)	Jenni Rivera ‡	
2012 (24th)	Diana Reyes	
2012 (24th)	Shaila Dúrcal	
2012 (24th)	Ely Quintero	
2013 (25th)	Jenni Rivera ‡	
2013 (25th)	Ely Quintero	
2013 (25th)	Shaila Dúrcal	
2013 (25th)	Diana Reyes	
2014 (26th)	Jenni Rivera ‡	
2014 (26th)	Ely Quintero	
2014 (26th)	Ana Bárbara	
2014 (26th)	Nena Guzmán	
2014 (26th)	Luz María	
2015 (27th)	Jenni Rivera ‡	
2015 (27th)	Ana Bárbara	
2015 (27th)	Luz María	
2015 (27th)	Chiquis Rivera	
2015 (27th)	Ely Quintero	
2016 (28th)	Chiquis Rivera ‡	
2016 (28th)	Graciela Beltrán	
2016 (28th)	Luz María	
2023 (35th)	Ángela Aguilar ‡	
2023 (35th)	Aida Cuevas	
2023 (35th)	Ana Bárbara	
2023 (35th)	Carolina Ross	
2023 (35th)	Chiquis Rivera	
2023 (35th)	Flor de Toloache	
2023 (35th)	Las Marías	
2023 (35th)	Lupita Infante	
2023 (35th)	Majo Aguilar	
2023 (35th)	Yuridia	

== See also ==
- List of music awards honoring women
