= Latin Grammy Award for Best Grupero Album =

- Awarded for: quality grupero albums
- Country: United States
- Presented by: The Latin Recording Academy
- First award: 2000
- Final award: 2009

Highlights
- Most awards: Joan Sebastian (2)
- Most nominations: Ana Bárbara & La Mafia (4)
- Website: latingrammy.com

The Latin Grammy Award for Best Grupero Album was an honor presented annually at the Latin Grammy Awards, a ceremony that recognizes excellence and creates a wider awareness of cultural diversity and contributions of Latin recording artists in the United States and internationally. The award was first handed to Los Temerarios during the 1st Latin Grammy Awards ceremony which took place at the Staples Center in Los Angeles, California under the name of Best Grupero Performance. In 2002 it was re-named Best Grupero Album. The category was discontinued in 2009, with Caballo Dorado being the last recipient of the award.

The male "Grupero artist" with the most wins and nominations is Joan Sebastian, with two nominations and both wins. The female "Grupero artist" with the most nominations and wins is Ana Bárbara, with 4 nominations and one win. The group with the most nominations and wins is La Mafia with four nominations and one win. The "Grupero act" with the most nominations is Guardianes del Amor with five. Other notable winners include Alicia Villarreal, Grupo Bryndis, and Atrapado. Some other notable nominees also include Bronco, Marco Antonio Solis, Jennifer Pena, Mariana Seoane, Grupo Limite, Grupo Mojado, and Liberacion.

== Winners and nominees ==
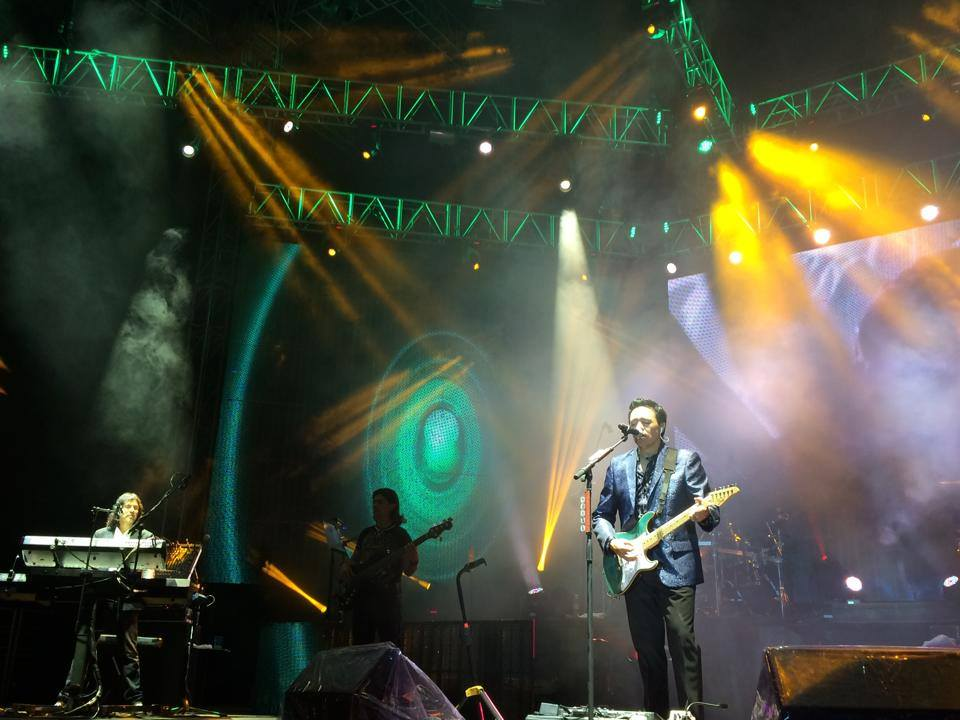
Mexican band Los Temerarios was the first recipient of the award.

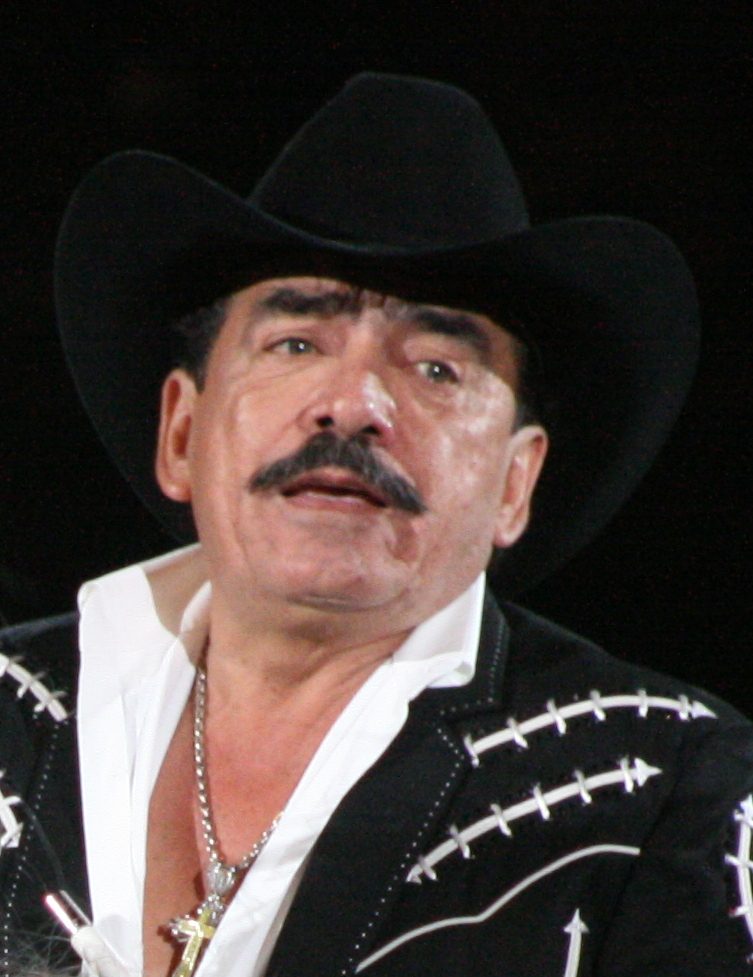
Two-time Joan Sebastian.

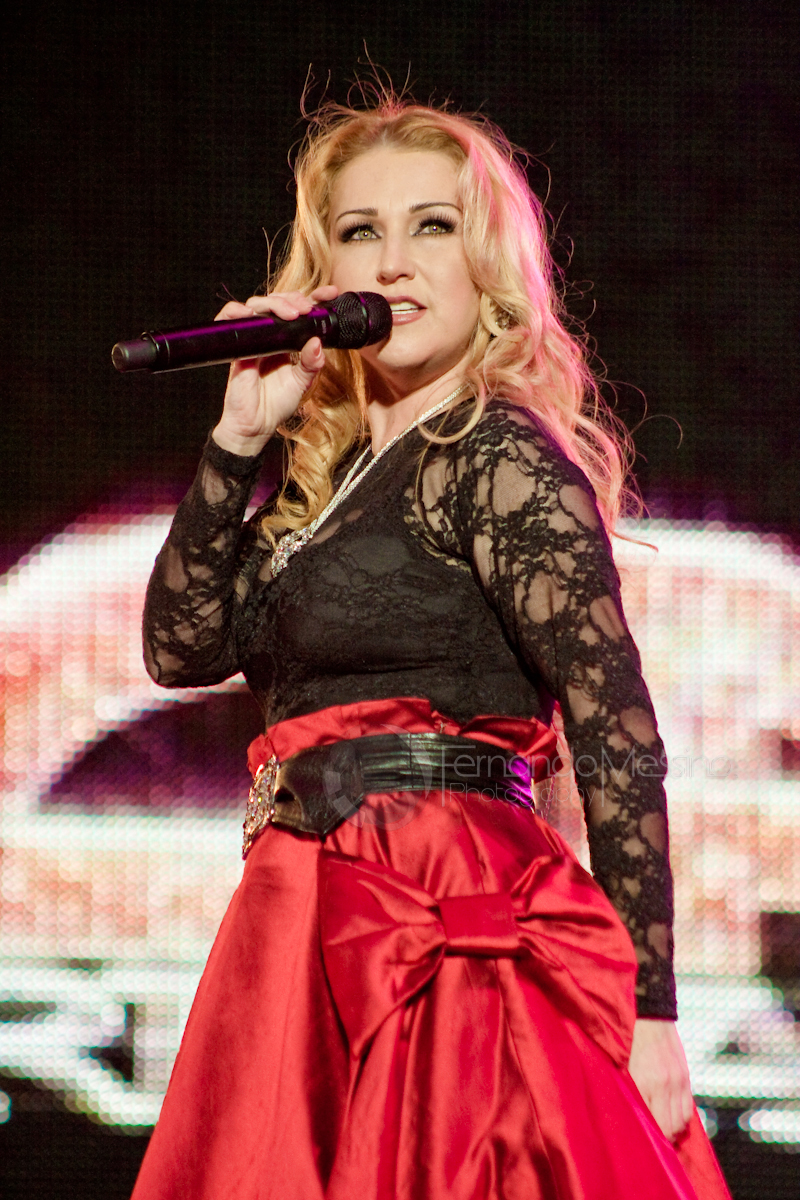
Alicia Villareal was the first female soloist to win the award.

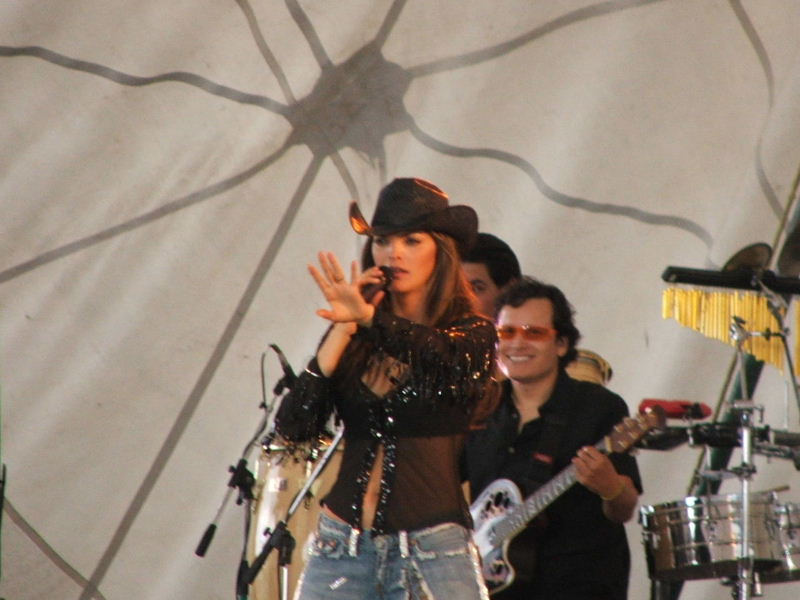
2005 winner Ana Bárbara is the most nominated female artist with four nominations.

| Year^{[I]} | Performing artist(s) | Work | Nominees^{[II]} | Ref. |
|---|---|---|---|---|
| 2000 | Los Temerarios | En La Madrugada se Fue | Ana Bárbara – Tu Decisión; Conjunto Primavera – Morir de Amor; Guardianes del Amor – Un Pedazo de Luna; La Mafia – Momentos | |
| 2001 | Límite | Por Encima de Todo | Caballo Dorado – No Dejes De Bailar; Guardianes del Amor – Un Millón De Lágrimas; La Mafia – Contigo; Mojado – Los Ángeles También Bailan | |
| 2002 | Joan Sebastian | Lo Dijo el Corazon | Grupo Bryndis – En el Idioma del Amor; Guardianes del Amor – Muriendo de Frio; Los Mismos – Perdón por Extrañarte; Priscila y Sus Balas De Plata – Para Mi Amor | |
| 2003 | Atrapado | ¿Qué Sentiras? | Alondra – Alondra; Ivan Díaz – Historias; Límite – Soy Así; Jennifer Peña – Libre | |
| 2004 | Alicia Villarreal | Cuando el Corazón se Cruza | Ana Bárbara – Te Atraparé... Bandido; Bronco el Gigante De América – Siempre Arriba; Ninel Conde – Ninel Conde; Mariana – Seré Una Niña Buena | |
| 2005 | Ana Bárbara | Loca de Amar | Bronco el Gigante De América – Sin Riendas; Guardianes del Amor – Olvidarte Nunca; Volumen X – Sigo Pensando en Ti | |
| 2005 | Oscar De La Rosa & La Mafia | Para el Pueblo | Bronco el Gigante De América – Sin Riendas; Guardianes del Amor – Olvidarte Nunca; Volumen X – Sigo Pensando en Ti | |
| 2006 | Joan Sebastian | En el Auditorio Nacional | Ana Bárbara – No Es Brujería; Grupo Bronco – Por Ti; Grupo Bryndis – Por Muchas Razones Te Quiero; Guardianes del Amor – Decórame el Corazón | |
| 2007 | Grupo Bryndis | Sólo Pienso en Ti | Caballo Dorado – Cabalgando en las Canciones de Joan Sebastian; Víctor García – Arráncame; Los Acosta – Siluetas; Los Ángeles de Charly – Un Tiempo, un Estilo, un Amor | |
| 2008 | Not awarded | | | |
| 2009 | Caballo Dorado | 15x12 | Pipe Bueno – Pipe Bueno; La Mafia – Eternamente Románticos; Liberación – Cada Vez Mas Fuerte; Marco Antonio Solís – No Molestar | |
