= La Trampa =

La Trampa may refer to:

- La Trampa (band), an Uruguayan rock band
- La Trampa (album), a 1995 album by Ana Bárbara
- The Trap (1949 film), a 1949 Argentine thriller film
