= List of number-one Billboard Regional Mexican Songs of 1998 =

The Billboard Regional Mexican Songs chart ranks the best-performing Regional Mexican singles in the United States. Published weekly by Billboard magazine, it ranks the "most popular regional Mexican songs, ranked by radio airplay audience impressions as measured by Nielsen Music."

== Chart history ==
Key
†	Indicates number 1 on Billboard's year-end regional Mexican chart

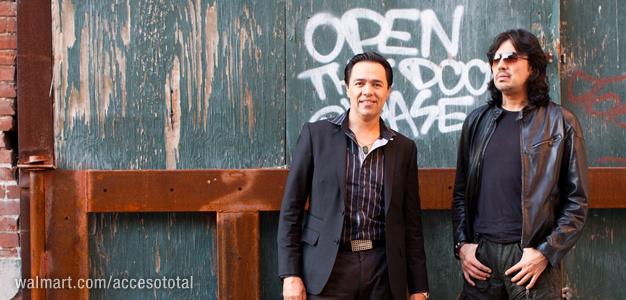
"¿Por qué te conocí?" by Mexican duo Los Temerarios (pictured) topped the chart for 13 weeks.

Issue date	Song	Artist(s)	Ref.
January 3	"La Venia bendita"	Marco Antonio Solís	
January 10	"Nos estorbó la ropa"	Vicente Fernández	
January 17	"Hasta mañana"	Grupo Límite	
January 24	"Hasta mañana"	Grupo Límite	
January 31	"Me vas a hacer llorar"	Marco Antonio Solís	
February 7	"¿Por qué te conocí?" †	Los Temerarios	
February 14	"¿Por qué te conocí?" †	Los Temerarios	
February 21	"Me vas a hacer llorar"	Marco Antonio Solís	
February 28	"¿Con qué derecho?"	Los Tigres del Norte	
March 7	"¿Con qué derecho?"	Los Tigres del Norte	
March 14	"¿Por qué te conocí?" †	Los Temerarios	
March 21	"¿Por qué te conocí?" †	Los Temerarios	
March 28	"¿Por qué te conocí?" †	Los Temerarios	
April 4	"¿Por qué te conocí?" †	Los Temerarios	
April 11	"¿Por qué te conocí?" †	Los Temerarios	
April 18	"¿Por qué te conocí?" †	Los Temerarios	
April 25	"¿Por qué te conocí?" †	Los Temerarios	
May 2	"¿Por qué te conocí?" †	Los Temerarios	
May 9	"¿Por qué te conocí?" †	Los Temerarios	
May 16	"¿Por qué te conocí?" †	Los Temerarios	
May 23	"¿Por qué te conocí?" †	Los Temerarios	
May 30	"Eres mi droga"	Intocable	
June 6	"Eres mi droga"	Intocable	
June 13	"Eres mi droga"	Intocable	
June 20	"Tu oportunidad"	Grupo Límite	
June 27	"Tu oportunidad"	Grupo Límite	
July 4	"Tu oportunidad"	Grupo Límite	
July 11	"Desde que te amo"	Los Tucanes de Tijuana	
July 18	"Desde que te amo"	Los Tucanes de Tijuana	
July 25	"Desde que te amo"	Los Tucanes de Tijuana	
August 1	"Desde que te amo"	Los Tucanes de Tijuana	
August 8	"Desde que te amo"	Los Tucanes de Tijuana	
August 15	"Desde que te amo"	Los Tucanes de Tijuana	
August 22	"Desde que te amo"	Los Tucanes de Tijuana	
August 29	"Desde que te amo"	Los Tucanes de Tijuana	
September 5	"Desde que te amo"	Los Tucanes de Tijuana	
September 12	"Desde que te amo"	Los Tucanes de Tijuana	
September 19	"Me voy a quitar de en medio"	Vicente Fernández	
September 26	"Me voy a quitar de en medio"	Vicente Fernández	
October 3	"Me voy a quitar de en medio"	Vicente Fernández	
October 24	"Cómo te recuerdo"	Los Temerarios	
October 31	"Cómo te recuerdo"	Los Temerarios	
November 7	"Cómo te recuerdo"	Los Temerarios	
November 14	"Cómo te recuerdo"	Los Temerarios	
November 21	"Cómo te recuerdo"	Los Temerarios	
November 28	"Cómo te recuerdo"	Los Temerarios	
December 5	"Cómo te recuerdo"	Los Temerarios	
December 12	"Cómo te recuerdo"	Los Temerarios	
December 19	"La otra parte del amor"	Grupo Límite	
December 26	"La otra parte del amor"	Grupo Límite	
