= Ana Bárbara =

Mexican singer (born 1971)

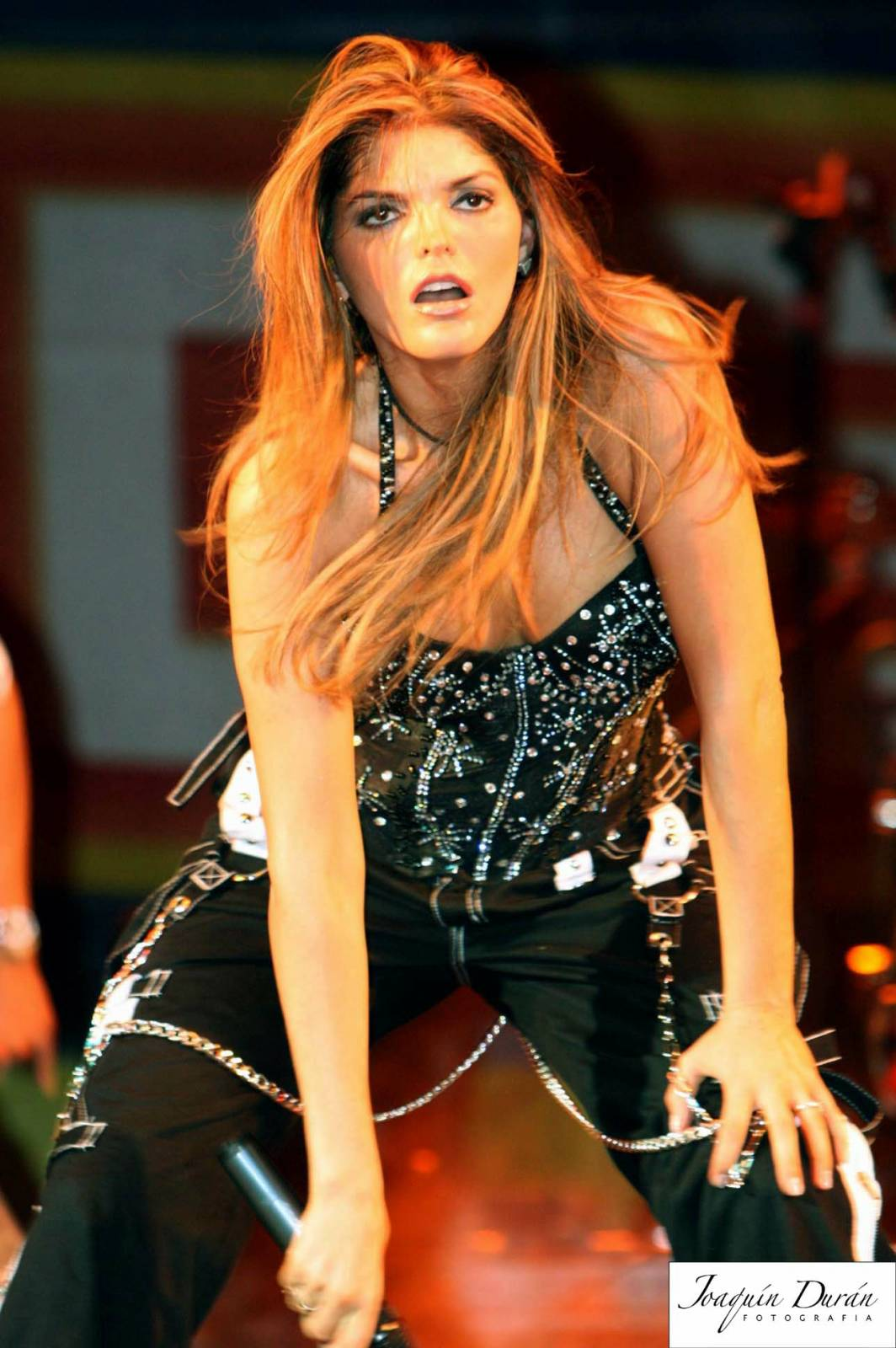
- Ana Bárbara in 2007
- Born: Altagracia Ugalde Motta; 10 January 1971 (age 55); El Pitayo, Sanciro De Acosta, San Luis Potosí, Mexico
- Occupations: Singer; songwriter
- Years active: 1994–present
- Spouse: José María Fernández «Pirru» (m. 2006; div. 2010)
- Children: 3
- Musical career
- Genres: Regional Mexican; Latin pop
- Instruments: Vocals; guitar
- Labels: Fonovisa; AB Productions; Lo Busqué Productions; Sony Music Latin
- Website: anabarbaramusic.com

Altagracia Ugalde Motta (born 10 January 1971), better known as Ana Bárbara, is a Mexican singer. She has become a prominent figure within Latin entertainment since her professional debut in 1994 and is one of the leading female figures in regional Mexican and grupero music.

In the past two decades, Bárbara has released eleven studio albums, eighteen compilation albums, over thirty music videos, and four music video DVDs. She has sold over 6 million records in Mexico, Central America, South America, and the United States; she is also the recipient of Latin music's most prestigious accolades.

== Career ==
=== Early career ===
In 1988, Ana Bárbara entered the local Miss Universe-sponsored Miss Mexico beauty pageant representing her native state of San Luis Potosí and won; however, she lost at the national level. By then, an unknown Altagracia Ugalde moved forward and began to seize any opportunity to sing at local talent shows, and at times professionally at variety of music events and festivals. In the 1990s she had the opportunity to tour overseas in Colombia and represent Mexico's mariachi music.

In 1993, Ana Bárbara was proclaimed the Ambassador of Ranchera Music. She also earned the El Rostro Bonito de El Heraldo de México ("The Heraldo's Beautiful Face") award. As a result, she was invited to perform for Pope John Paul II during a Mass at The Vatican. When Mass neared its close; however, she still hadn't been given an opportunity to sing, so she interrupted the proceedings, commanded the attention of the Pope, and began to sing. After mass Pope John Paul II approached her, blessed her, and wished her luck in her career. In 1994, she was noticed by record executives from Fonovisa, one of the top labels in the regional Mexican market. After signing with Fonovisa, she created artistic stage name "Ana Bárbara" and launched her self-titled debut album Ana Bárbara. Songs like Sacúdeme and Nada helped Bárbara establish herself as a Grupero star. Bárbara released her second album titled La Trampa in July 1995, also produced by Aníbal Pastor. La Trampa catapulted her popularity and immediately became a commercial and radio hit. Bárbara received industry accolades as well as invitations to tour and open for some of the biggest regional Mexican artists, such as Vicente Fernandez and Los Tigres del Norte. She has appeared on important Latin American television shows such as Sabado Gigante and Siempre en Domingo. Consecutive hits and popular music videos, such as Me Asusta Pero Me Gusta and La Trampa, topped Billboard Hot Latin Tracks and established her as La Reina Grupera (The Queen of Grupero Music).

=== International stardom ===
By the summer of 1996, Ana Bárbara broke through to mainstream international success with third album Ay, Amor. The album solidified her as a successful Latin recording artist and also became her best album debut on the Latin Billboard charts. Ay, Amor offered a wider appeal to her music by offering some alternate takes on Grupero, and even some ranchero flavoured ballads like No Ha Sido Facil, and Entre Ella y Yo. Her attractive appearance and sensual dancing style captivated Latin America audiences during promotional tours with hit singles and music videos of No Lloraré and Ya No Te Creo Nada. In 1997 she released her first and only calendar. Coors Light beer also selected Bárbara as their Hispanic promotional figure for marketing and advertising. Later that year she returned to Miami, Florida for the annual Calle 8 Music Festival where she was crowned "Queen" of the 1997 parade. In 1998, she released her fourth studio album produced by Mexican singer-songwriter Marco Antonio Solís. The album, titled Los Besos No Se Dan En La Camisa, was largely a ballads album with only one Grupero-style song. It included a duet and background vocals by Solís, as well as a 1982 Los Bukis cover of "Como Me Haces Falta", which quickly became a popular hit. The song also dominated airwaves across Latin America, Mexico, and the United States. Bárbara kept up the momentum of her previous release as her popularity continued to grow. In 1999, she released fifth studio album Tu Decisión, produced by Aníbal Pastor. One of his two songwriting credits, "Engañada", became the album's lead single and most popular hit. Tu Decisión was also notable in songwriting terms because it marked Bárbara's debut as a songwriter. In the same year she also debuted as an actress, starring in the made-for-TV film Todo Contigo, via Hispanic networks Televisa and Univision. The film's song "Todo Contigo" was included in album Tu Decisión. Music videos like "Quise Olvidar" grew in popularity on television shows like Onda Max and other music video television networks. The following year Bárbara became the first solo grupero act recognized by The Latin Academy of Recording Arts & Sciences for album Tu Decisión, which received a Latin Grammy nomination for Best Grupero Album.

In 2000, Ana Bárbara took a short maternity leave when her first child, Emiliano, was born. She returned in 2001 with her sixth studio album, Te Regalo La Lluvia. The Mariachi-ballad effort was a challenge to her custom Grupero style; however, industry critics who had written off Bárbara as simply "a grupero novelty built chiefly upon sex appeal" consequently took her and her music a bit more seriously. In the fall, she received her second Latin Grammy nomination for Best Ranchero Album. She participated in "El Último Adiós (The Last Goodbye)", a song written in memory of the 9/11 attacks, which included other artists, such as Alejandro Fernández, Marco Antonio Solís, Thalía, and Ricky Martin, among others. As Bárbara promoted her album, Te Regalo La Lluvia, she began preparations for a Grupero-style album.

After several years as a recording artist, Ana Bárbara began to produce her own material. She took control of the direction of her music and began to compose, arrange, and select her own lyrics and melodies, yet followed patterns of earlier albums.

In September 2003, Te Atraparé...Bandido was released; it became one of her most successful albums to date. Soon record executives pushed for a follow-up album, and in May 2005 she produced and released Loca de Amar. She continued booking success with popular chart-topping singles like Bandido, Deja, Loca, and Lo Busqué, which dominated airwaves across South America, Mexico, and the United States, as well as on Billboard Hot Latin Tracks.

=== Selena tribute concert ===
In 2005, she participated in Selena ¡VIVE!, an anniversary tribute concert held in honour of Latin music icon Selena. The star-studded event was held on 7 April 2005, at Reliant Stadium in Houston, Texas and included mainstream acts, such as Thalía, Ana Gabriel, Alejandra Guzman, Olga Tañón, Pepe Aguilar, and Banda el Recodo, among others. The iconic tribute was produced by Spanish-language network Univision, and made history by becoming the most watched Spanish-language television special in the US. Bárbara produced and co-wrote a new version of "La Carcacha", which mixed Selena's original version with her Grupero signature style.

=== 2005 Latin Grammy recognition ===
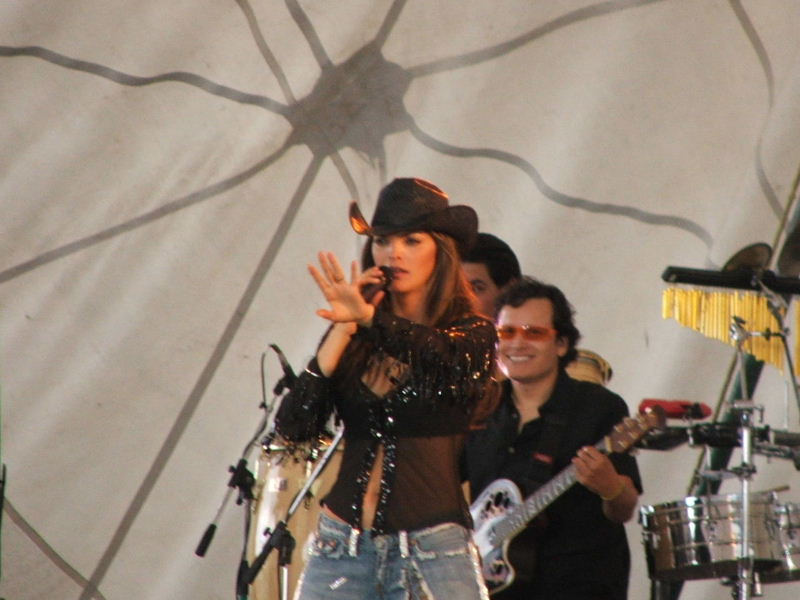
Ana Bárbara in Puebla's Plaza de la Concordia (2005)

In 2005 Ana Bárbara was awarded a Latin Grammy Award for Best Grupero Album for her album, Loca de Amar at the 6th Annual Latin Grammy ceremony held at the Shrine Auditorium in Los Angeles. This was also Bárbara's Grammy ceremony debut where she performed a medley of Lo Busqué and Loca.

When her career was in its peak popularity she put her career on hold for several years in order to dedicate time to her new family. She also relocated to the popular resort city of Cancún, Mexico with new husband Pirru and their three children. Her second child, José María, was born in the fall of 2006. During her "time-off," she joined the food-industry business. In 2008, Ana Bárbara opened a nightclub Bandido located in Cancún. It was sold to a business investor a year later.

=== 2008 and 2009 ===
In 2008, Ana Bárbara appeared in a concert tribute for José José, performing his hit Lo Pasado, Pasado.

In April 2009, she was featured on the cover of People en Español on the "Los 50 Más Bellos" list.

=== Return to recording and Fonovisa departure ===
Several compilation albums and DVDs were released during her time off, such as Una Mujer, Un Sueño and Para Ti, Mi Historia. Compilation albums featuring peers such as Alicia Villarreal, Jennifer Pena, and Selena, were also released by record label Fonovisa. After taking nearly five years off from recording, Ana Bárbara remained a favourite in the music industry. AllMusic.com said: "She has not only dominated the Grupero movement, but Ana Bárbara is one of the driving forces behind the Grupero-style realization." During the pre-planning and creative realization of album Rompiendo Cadenas, she began to deviate from her Grupero beginnings and slowly traversed into Latin Pop. This musical change became evident in the fall of 2009 with the release of Rompiendo Cadenas; an uptempo Urban/Pop track, produced by Dominican duo Luny Tunes featuring Reggaeton duo Dyland & Lenny. The music video for Rompiendo Cadenas was filmed in La Habana, Cuba and quickly reached over four million views on YouTube. Rompiendo Cadenas debuted at number 39 on Billboard's Latin Pop Songs on 12 November 2009. Two alternate versions of the song "Rompiendo Cadenas" premiered on iTunes, one in banda and another in acoustic. Bárbara introduced her Latin pop album Rompiendo Cadenas in January 2010. During its press conference, she described the departure with label Fonovisa Records. Not only did the album Rompiendo Cadenas reveal a completely different genre, but she was also sole songwriter of the 10-track album, a challenge she had never experimented with. Furthermore, Fonovisa Records request to reconsider and change the music style or terminate the contract. Ana Bárbara left Fonovisa after increasing problems and immediately launched Rompiendo Cadenas on her own record label AB Productions / (Lo Busqué Productions).

In 2010 she hosted a series of events for Hispanic networks Univision and TeleFutura. She and Puerto Rican singer Víctor Manuelle hosted the 2010 Lo Nuestro Awards live from Miami, Florida. Bárbara was voted finalist for most elegant dressed celebrity. The following day she participated in a star-studded Spanish remake of Michael Jackson's We Are the World, titled Somos El Mundo alongside Juanes, Juan Luis Guerra, Ricky Martin, Daddy Yankee, Thalía, Shakira, Pitbull, Gloria Estefan, Jenni Rivera, and Luis Miguel. In the same month, she hosted a televised music special in honour of fallen Latin icon Selena. She also participated as judge for a special Selena contest titled Buscando la doble de Selena, alongside Hollywood producer Moctesuma Esparza, and Merengue music singer Milly Quezada. In March 2010, the second single from Rompiendo Cadenas premiered to mixed reviews. While the lead track "Rompiendo Cadenas" became the album's most notable hit, Latin rock single "Que Ironía" signalled that her patented formula was beginning to run out of steam. The track was also featured in a pop version, but neither sparked much interest in radio or the general public. Bárbara later explained that the song was originally written and intended for Mexican pop singer Gloria Trevi, but when her eldest son Emiliano reassured her confidence, she decided to take a new challenge, record the track, and make it her own. A music video premiered the following month and reached over a million views. Although album Rompiendo Cadenas did not fare well in sale comparison to previous efforts, it did win Ana Bárbara critical acclaim and was well received by fans. In May 2010, she announced two new additional Latin pop songs. The first track was "Ahora Tengo", a duet featuring Mexican singer-songwriter Reyli; its music video was filmed in New York and premiered in June 2010. The next song was "Alma Perdida", a powerful ballad composed specifically for Univision's mini-series Mujeres Asesinas 3.

In 2011 projects included an appearance in Univision's soap opera Una Familia Con Suerte; the cameo role became her official debut as an actress in a soap opera. Ana Bárbara also sang Suerte, which was included in the soap opera soundtrack. In the fall, she released yet another Latin pop bonus track and music video titled "Refugio Para el Amor", but like several recent releases since 2009's "Rompiendo Cadenas", they too garnered a lukewarm reception.

=== 2012 relocation, music, television show, and Hollywood ===
After an unsuccessful period, Ana Bárbara began writing and producing tracks for a new regional Mexican album recorded for the first time in banda. In 2012, she revealed career projects that included a new single and filming a television show. She migrated to the United States, Los Angeles area with her three children. She released stand-alone banda single "Tu Ingratitud", a 1993 Los Bukis cover composed by Marco Antonio Solís. A music video was released in July 2012 and quickly reached over three millions of views on YouTube. "Tu Ingratitud" peaked at number one in Mexico and top 20 in United States and South America. The record soon reached international popularity and became Bárbara's return to music charts and touring. She also collaborated with peers such as María José, Anahí, and La Original Banda El Limon in each of their new albums. In July 2012, she became the newest judge on Estrella TV's music and reality contest Tengo Talento, Mucho Talento,. She replaced fellow regional Mexican singer Jenni Rivera for the seventh season after Rivera left to judge La Voz Mexico. In October 2012, "Dos Abrazos", a song written by Ana Bárbara from her multi-Grammy nominated album No Es Brujería, appeared in Sharon Stone's 2012 Hollywood motion picture, Border Run. A banda version of "Dos Abrazos" was later re-released in her eleventh studio album. The motion picture went straight to DVD and was released in February 2013. On 8 December 2012, Ana Bárbara sang Mexico's national anthem during the Manny Pacquiao vs. Juan Manuel Márquez IV fight live from Las Vegas, Nevada.

=== 2013 television show and music ===
In April 2013, Ana Bárbara hosted the 2013 Latin Billboard Music Awards live from Miami, Florida via the Telemundo network; however, her best highlight was an impromptu "a capella" serenade to Latin music icon Jose Jose. In July, she returned to small television soap operas. She had a singing performance cameo in Televisa and Univision soap opera Amores verdaderos grand finale where she sang the popular Franco de Vita ballad "Tu De Que Vas". In August, she became the voice of "Yo Soy la Mujer", the theme song to Telemundo's soap opera Marido En Alquiler. She premiered "Yo Soy la Mujer" in a banda version on La Voz Kids grand finale. She participated in the 2013 Premios de la Radio's tribute in honour of Mexican singer Jenni Rivera; she performed one of Rivera's most popular hits, "Inolvidable". She continued filming small television during the 8th and 9th season of Tengo Talento, Mucho Talento,. During the reality show finale in November, she premiered heartbreak track "Yo Ya No Estoy". After a long layoff to concentrate on family and filming small television, she released "Yo Soy La Mujer" on 3 December 2013. Although she had produced and composed banda for over a decade, her eleventh studio album became her first full banda album. During a press interview at The Congo Room, she stated, "Yo Soy La Mujer" is sentimental, but fun; it has a blend of traditional and modern banda elements and sounds that pay tribute to my heritage and childhood." The 10-track album included songwriting from fellow Mexican artists Joan Sebastian ("Los Cazahuates"), Marco Antonio Solís ("Tu Ingratitud"), José Alfredo Jiménez ("Te Vas o Te Quedas"), and Reyli ("Yo Ya No Estoy"). The album peaked at No. 11 on Top Latin Albums in the United States and yielded her best studio album debut on the charts in over a decade. A music video for lead single "Ahora Me Toca A Mí" premiered on her official Vevo account, along with a Latin pop version.

=== 2014 20 Year Celebration and Yo Soy La Mujer projects ===
Yo Soy La Mujer was released in Mexico in February 2014; a limited edition included two previously unreleased tracks: "Al Pie de un Árbol" and "Como Quieras Quiero". In January 2014, Bárbara announced the Yo Soy La Mujer: Celebrando 20 Años de Trayectoria tour in honour of her 20-year musical career, she stated that the tour symbolized the end of an era and the beginning of a new chapter in her professional life. The tour kicked off internationally in La Paz, Bolivia. The tour made its way through Peru, Chile and other countries in South America and Central America, as well as big cities in the United States. In April, she premiered second single "A Donde Crees Que Vas" on CNN en Español. Not only did she become a self-proclaimed "advocate of woman empowerment," but her music videos and wardrobe ensembles also revealed a stronger sex-appeal than ever before. She announced a duet with K'ala Marka for "Niña de mis Ojos".

Ana Bárbara celebrated two decades in the music business on 12 April 2014, at the Dolby Theatre in Hollywood, California. She performed popular songs from her repertoire, medleys of her beginnings, and classics from icons Juan Gabriel, Lola Beltran, and José Alfredo Jiménez. The intimate show was full of surprises, including the unexpected appearance by Marco Antonio Solís, who was on hand to personally congratulate her and perform a duet. Singers such as Pepe Aguilar, Cristian Castro, and Enrique Iglesias also sent words of love and support during the show. The two-hour special aired in October 2014 via Estrella TV. She ended the Yo Soy La Mujer tour in Guatemala among a crowd of over eighteen thousand people.

=== 2015 tour and album ===
Ana Bárbara made an eleven-city tour of America, beginning in San Francisco on New Year's Eve 2015. The tour included Seattle, Las Vegas, Denver, Chicago and Houston. She was also one of the collaborators on Compass, Toy Selectah & Camilo Lara's album.

== Personal life ==
Ana Bárbara got engaged to José Maria Fernández (Pirru) in 2005.

In June 2010 there was speculation over divorce rumours between Ana Bárbara and Pirru, due to his infidelity. On 2 July 2010, Bárbara released a statement confirming the end of their five-year marriage. Months after the split, she confirmed a new relationship with wealthy business man Elias Sacal, but that also went sour several months later.

In 2006, Ana Bárbara released the official 2006 FIFA World Cup soccer anthem Arriba Arriba, and her ninth studio album No Es Brujería.

=== 2010–2011 car accidents ===
In July 2010, Ana Bárbara was involved in a car accident in Cancún that left a 79-year-old woman dead; the incident sparked a media circus. Authorities arrested Ana Bárbara's driver (bodyguard and family friend). Some eyewitnesses, however, speculated that it was Ana Bárbara who was driving. She denied the accusations and any wrongdoing. Due to immense media pressure, Ana Bárbara granted network Televisa an exclusive interview where she broke down in tears and offered the victim's family an apology about the accident. She also stated that on-scene police authorities allowed her to leave the scene because they had apprehended her driver. To add fuel to the fire, the victim's daughter used several media outlets to blast Ana Bárbara and presume that it was she that was driving. Ana Bárbara was exonerated after Mexican authorities found no evidence that could have linked her behind the wheel. She faced civil charges for being the registered owner of the vehicle involved in the accident. In December 2010, Mexico's CNDH (Human Rights National Committee) recommended that the governor and Municipal President of Quintana Roo review the case after a petition was filed by the victim's family claiming investigative fallacies. During the appeal, Bárbara was called to re-testify, but was found innocent of any wrongdoing. Munguía (driver) was free on bail while the case was pending, but in October 2011 he pleaded guilty to involuntary manslaughter. In early 2012, he was sentenced to two years in prison; he was released in 2014. On 3 February 2011, Bárbara was involved in another car accident in Cancún, Quintana Roo. Officials in the Mexican state of Quintana Roo say the singer was driving a Porsche Cayenne that hit the back of another vehicle at a stop light. Traffic officer Abraham Coutino said "no one was injured" and "the singer's insurance covered all damages." Bárbara was highly criticized by the media once again, but asked the general public not to believe the exaggerated reports over the minor fender bender accident.

=== 2011 third pregnancy ===
After divorcing Ana Bárbara announced in August 2011 that she was pregnant via artificial insemination. She decided to undergo the procedure after her children suggested they wanted a bigger family. She said she expected to be criticized for deciding to have a child without a father, but she would not let the criticism bother her. "I felt my puzzle was missing a piece and now it's complete," she told the Mexican edition of ¡Hola! magazine. Her third child was born in December 2011 in Mexico City. In March 2012, Ana Bárbara revealed the identity of Jeronimo's father to ¡Hola! magazine as longtime best friend, singer-songwriter Reyli.

=== Health concerns ===
After several public and tumultuous incidents in recent years, Ana Bárbara experienced depression and anorexia. She confirmed via Twitter in March 2011 that she had "an illness" and was receiving treatment in Spain to improve her overall well-being. In July 2011, Ana Bárbara confirmed that she was moving from Mexico and relocating to the United States. She moved to Little Tokyo in Los Angeles, California.

== Awards ==
Ana Bárbara is the recipient Latin Grammy's, Lo Nuestro Awards, Juventud Awards, and Oye Awards.

Her former record label Fonovisa said, "These recognitions are milestone accomplishments in [her] career that has spanned for more than a decade of uninterrupted success in the United States, Mexico and Latin America."

She has also been awarded four Lo Nuestro Awards for Regional Mexican Female Artist of the Year, with a total of 9 nominations since her debut. She has won the following years: 1996, 1997, 1998, and in 2006.

She has received seven Premio Furia Musical Awards, as well three Premio El Heraldo trophies: one for Best New Artist in 1994 and two Best Female Singer in 1997 and 2000.

In 2002, Ana Bárbara won the a Casandra Award for Most Outstanding International Artist.

In 2005, she won My Favorite Regional Mexican Artist at Univision's Juventud Awards and a singer-songwriter award at the Latin Grammy Awards.

She was 2006's Best Female Performer at Mexico's Oye! Awards (Mexico's version of the Grammy Awards).

In September 2012, she was crowned queen of the LGBT community in Los Angeles, California, as well as in Atlanta, Georgia in 2014 and in San Francisco on 1 January 2015.

By the fall of 2012, she was honored for her 20-year music trajectory from Regional Mexican Music award show Premios de la Radio. In a career spanning over 20 years, she has sold over 8 million albums, singles, and videos worldwide, making her one of the few female interpreters of Regional Mexican music to garner an international following that extends beyond México and the United States." To celebrate her first career recognition, Bárbara performed a medley of signature songs: "Lo Busque," "Como Me Haces Falta," "Tu Ingratitud," and "Bandido". She also celebrated the special ceremony by performing a duet of "Te Voy Olvidar" with Jenni Rivera (only one month before Rivera's death).

In 2013, she was nominated for Female Artist of the Year at Premios de la Radio and the Mexican Billboard Music Awards.

In 2014, she was nominated for Female Artist of the Year at Lo Nuestro Awards, Premios de la Radio, and People En Español's Entertainment Awards.

In 2015, Ana Bárbara was nominated for Regional Mexican Female Artist of the Year at Univsion's Lo Nuestro Awards.

By 2015, Ana Barbara reached over 75 million combined YouTube views of her music videos and special televised performances. She was scheduled to be honoured by the Las Vegas Walk of Stars in 2015.

== Filmography ==
Films
Year	Title	Role	Notes
2002	Todo contigo	Ana Bárbara	Television film

Television
Year	Title	Role	Notes
2001	Mujer, casos de la vida real	Unknown role	Episode: "Canto de sirena"
2004	La escuelita VIP	Ana Bárbara	Episode: "Bienvenida a Ana Bárbara" (Season 1, Episode 16)
2011	Una familia con suerte	Laura Torrés de López	Special appearance
2013	Amores verdaderos	Herself	Musical guest
2013	Marido en alquiler	Herself	Musical guest Song: "Yo soy la mujer"

== Discography ==
- Ana Bárbara (1994)
- La Trampa (1995)
- Ay, amor (1996)
- Los besos no se dan en la camisa (1997)
- Tu decisión (1999)
- Te regalo la lluvia (2001)
- Te atraparé... Bandido (2003)
- Loca de amar (2004)
- No es brujería (2006)
- Rompiendo cadenas (2009)
- Yo soy la mujer (2014)
- Bordado A Mano (2023)
