= Me Equivoqué =

Me Equivoqué may refer to:

- Me Equivoqué, a 1995 album by Alex Bueno
- Me Equivoqué, a 2013 EP and song by Mario Álvarez
- "Me Equivoqué", a 2010 song by A.B. Quintanilla y Los Kumbia All Starz from La Vida de un Genio
- "Me Equivoqué", a 2013 song by Aymée Nuviola
- "Me Equivoqué", a 2014 song by CD9
- "Me Equivoqué", a 2011 song by Fanny Lu from Felicidad y Perpetua
- "Me Equivoqué", a 2007 song by María José from María José
- "Me Equivoqué", a 2004 song by Mariana Seoane from Seré Una Niña Buena
- "Me Equivoqué", a 2006 song by Mœnia featuring Denisse Guerrero of Belanova
- "Me Equivoqué", a 2016 song by Ventino

== See also ==
- "Me Equivoqué Contigo", a song by José Alfredo Jiménez covered by multiple artists
