= Bebiendo Lágrimas =

Bebiendo Lágrimas (Spanish for 'drinking tears') may refer to:

- "Bebiendo Lágrimas", a 2004 song by Los Guardianes del Amor
- "Bebiendo Lágrimas", a 2026 song by Karol G from No Me Arrepiento de Sentir Tanto
