= La Malquerida (album) =

Studio album by Mariana Seoane
- Released: 2012
- Genre: Pop
- Label: Fonovisa

Mariana Seoane chronology
Que No Me Faltes Tú Y Muchos Éxitos Más (2007)	La Malquerida (2012)

Singles from La Malquerida
- 1. "Loca"; 2. "La Malquerida"; 3. "Nadie me lo conto"

La Malquerida is the sixth album by the Mexican singer Mariana Seoane, launched in 2012.

== Track listing ==
1. Me Equivoqué
2. Una de Dos
3. Que No Me Faltes Tú
4. Mermelada
5. La Malquerida
6. La Mañana
7. Nadie Me Lo Contó
8. Loca
9. Atrévete a Mirarme de Frente
10. No Vuelvo Contigo
11. El Pueblo
12. Tan Sólo Puedo Amarte
