= Que No Me Faltes Tú Y Muchos Éxitos Más =

Mariana Esta De Fiesta... Atrévete!!!

Studio album by Mariana Seoane
- Released: 2007
- Genre: Pop
- Label: Fonovisa

Mariana Seoane chronology
Mariana Esta De Fiesta... Atrévete!!! (2007)	Mariana Esta De Fiesta... Atrévete!!! (2007)	La Malquerida (2012)

Singles from Que No Me Faltes Tú Y Muchos Éxitos Más

Que No Me Faltes Tú Y Muchos Éxitos Más is the fifth album by the Mexican singer Mariana Seoane, launched in 2007.

== Track listing ==
1. Que No Me Faltes Tu
2. No Vuelvo Contigo
3. Que Rico
4. Que Mal Eligiste
5. El Pueblo
6. El Amor de Tu Vida
7. Me Equivoque
8. Si Te Vas
9. Como Tu Sabes
10. Que Nos Paso
11. Ahora Vete
12. No es Normal
