= Con Sabor A... Mariana =

Studio album by Mariana Seoane
- Released: 2006
- Genre: Pop
- Label: Univisión

Mariana Seoane chronology
La Niña Buena (2005)	Con Sabor A... Mariana (2006)	Mariana Esta De Fiesta... Atrévete!!! (2007)

Singles from Con Sabor A... Mariana
- 1. "Mermelada"; 2. "El Pueblo"

Con Sabor A... Mariana is the third album by the Mexican singer Mariana Seoane, released in 2006.

== Track listing ==
1. Mermelada
2. El Pueblo
3. Que Rico
4. Ahora Vete
5. Con Veneno O Con Miel
6. La Mañana
7. Caricatura De Amor
8. No Te Dejo De Pensar
9. Si Te Vas
10. Tan Sólo Puedo Amarte
11. Mermelada [Cumbia Norteña]
