= La Niña Buena =

Studio album by Mariana Seoane
- Released: 2005
- Genre: Pop
- Label: Univisión

Mariana Seoane chronology
Seré Una Niña Buena (2004)	La Niña Buena (2005)	Con Sabor A... Mariana (2006)

Singles from La Niña Buena
- 1. "Una de dos" 2. "No Vulevo Contigo"

La Niña Buena is the second album by the Mexican singer Mariana Seoane, released in 2005.

== Track listing ==
1. Una De Dos
2. Como Tú Sabes
3. No Vuelvo Contigo
4. Bendito Favor
5. La Luna Y Tú
6. No Es Normal
7. Lucas, Lucas
8. Dime Que Me Necesitas
9. Al Amor De Tu Vida
10. ¿Qué Nos Pasó?
