= Somos El Mundo 25 Por Haiti =

Single by Artists for Haiti
- Released: March 1, 2010
- Recorded: February 19, 2010
- Venue: American Airlines Arena (Miami, FL)
- Genre: Latin pop; R&B
- Length: 6:49
- Label: Univision Music Group; El Cartel Records
- Songwriter(s): Michael Jackson; Daddy Yankee; Lionel Richie; Emilio Estefan; Gloria Estefan
- Producer(s): Emilio Estefan (exec.); Quincy Jones

Music video
- "Somos El Mundo Por Haiti" on YouTube

"Somos El Mundo 25 Por Haiti" is a 2010 song and charity single recorded by the Latin supergroup Artists for Haiti and written by Emilio Estefan and his wife Gloria Estefan. It is a Spanish-language remake of the 1985 hit song "We Are the World", which was written by American musicians Michael Jackson and Lionel Richie, and was recorded by USA for Africa to benefit famine relief in Africa.

Around the time that the English remake version of the song "We Are the World 25 for Haiti" was released, it was announced that Emilio and Gloria Estefan were planning to record a Spanish version of the song featuring musicians of Latino descent. "Somos El Mundo 25 Por Haiti" was recorded on February 19, 2010, and the song was premiered on March 1, during the El Show de Cristina television show. It has been confirmed that all revenue from "Somos El Mundo 25 Por Haiti" will go to earthquake relief in Haiti.

== Background ==
Emilio and Gloria Estefan, along with Quincy Jones and other singers joined forces with Univision to record a Spanish version of "We Are the World" to raise money for Haitian earthquake victims. The song was adapted by Emilio and Gloria Estefan. Univision was a co-producer and distributor of the song.

This version was recorded on February 19, 2010, at American Airlines Arena in Miami. Olga Tañon was the first artist to put her voice on February 17, 2010, because previous commitments prevented her from participating in the recording group. The singer said that she was assigned to interpret a stanza which corresponds to the one Cyndi Lauper sung in the original 1985 version. Others who participated in a previous recording session were Jose Feliciano, José Luis Rodríguez and Ricardo Montaner. The song premiered during El Show de Cristina on March 1, 2010.

== Artists for Haiti musicians ==
Conductors

- Emilio Estefan
- Gloria Estefan
- Quincy Jones

Soloists (in order of appearance)

- Juanes
- Ricky Martin
- José Feliciano
- Vicente Fernández
- Luis Enrique
- Romeo Santos
- Pee Wee
- Belinda
- José Luis Rodríguez
- Banda El Recodo
- Shakira
- Thalía
- Jenni Rivera
- Tito El Bambino
- Kany García
- Luis Fonsi
- Jon Secada
- Willy Chirino
- Lissette
- Ana Bárbara
- Gilberto Santa Rosa
- Juan Luis Guerra
- David Archuleta
- Cristian Castro
- Ednita Nazario
- Paquita la del Barrio
- Ricardo Montaner
- Gloria Estefan
- Luis Miguel (voice)
- Chayanne
- Olga Tañón
- Natalia Jiménez
- Paulina Rubio
- Nicky Jam
- Melina León
- Pitbull (rap)
- Taboo (rap)
- Daddy Yankee (rap)

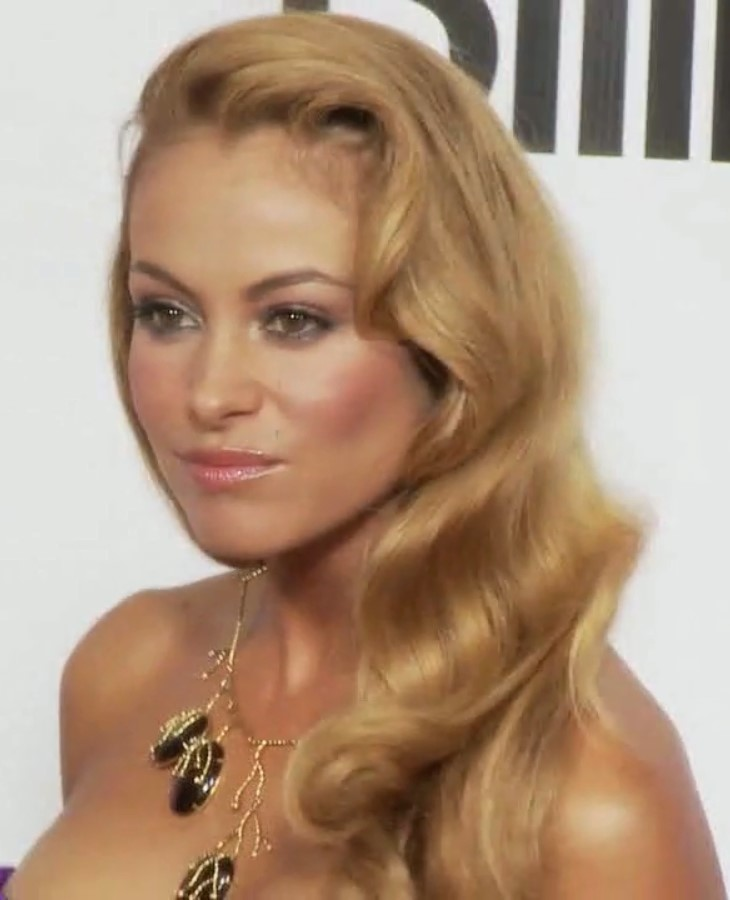
Paulina Rubio

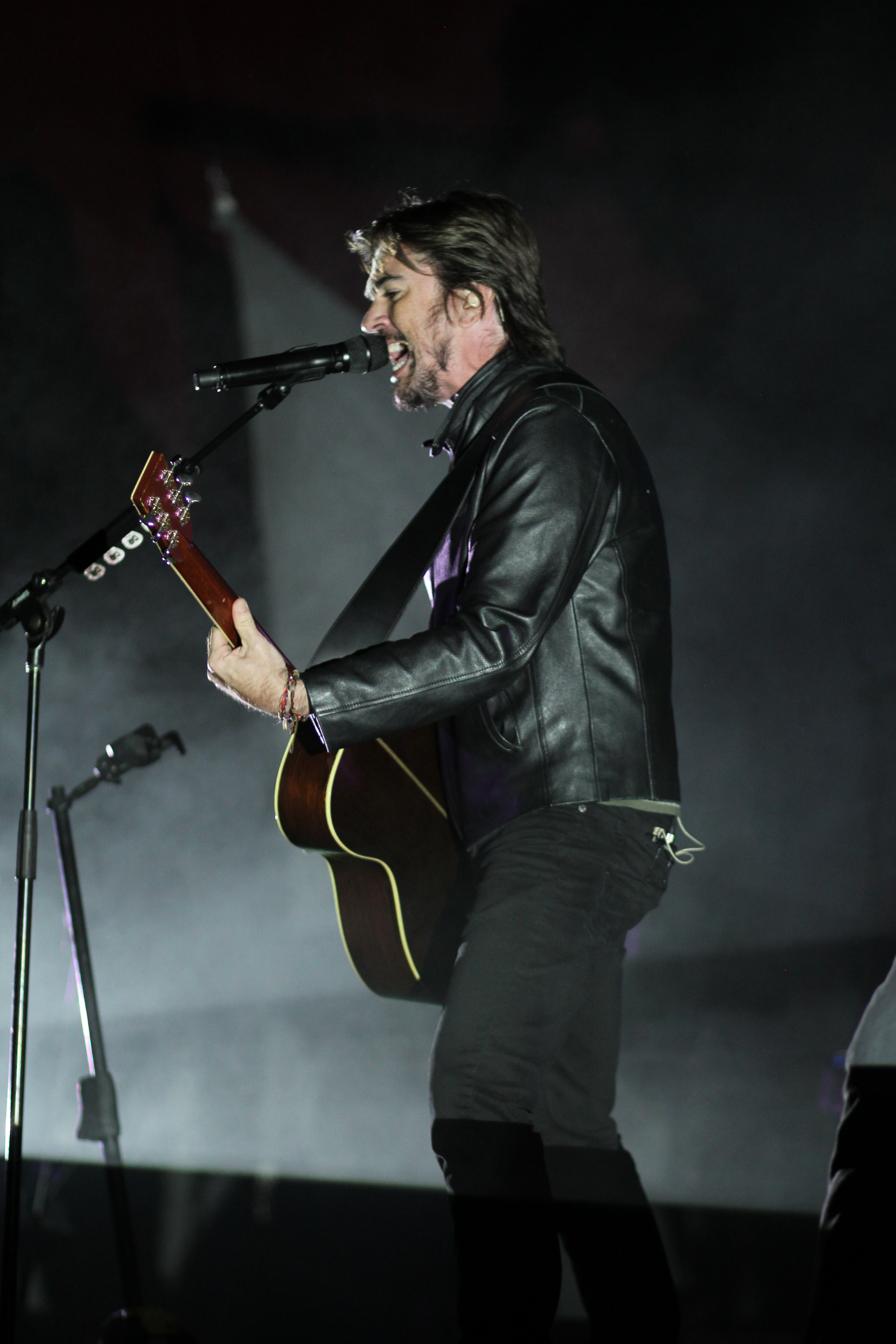
Juanes

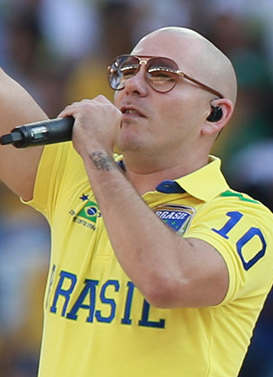
Pitbull

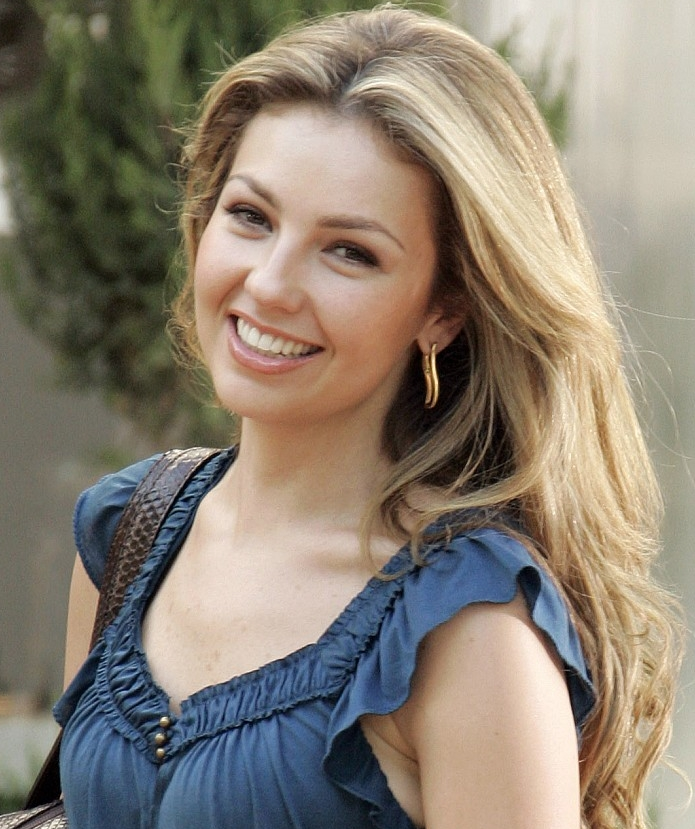
Thalía

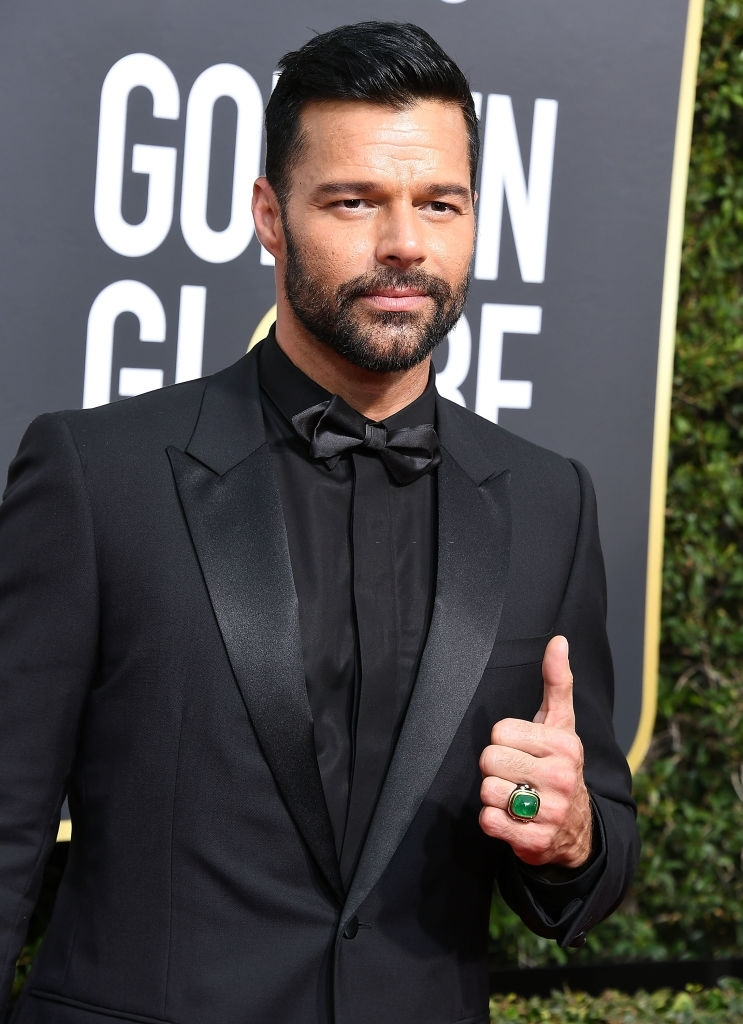
Ricky Martin

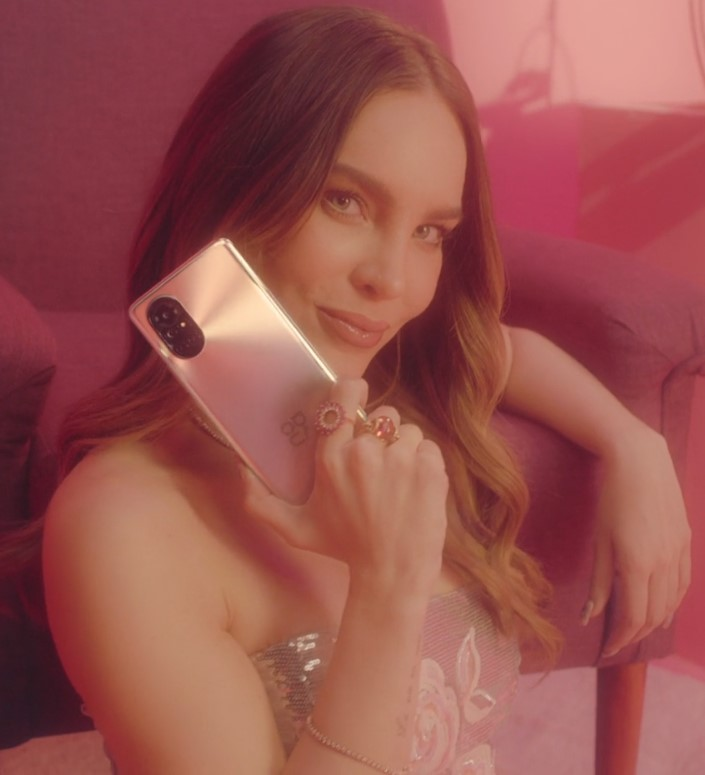
Belinda Peregrín

Chorus

- A.B. Quintanilla
- Alacranes Musical
- Alejandro Fernández
- Aleks Syntek
- Alexandra Cheron
- Andy García
- Angélica María
- Angélica Vale
- Arthur Hanlon
- Carlos Santana (guitar)
- Christian Chávez
- Cristina Saralegui
- Diana Reyes
- Eddy Herrera
- Eiza González
- Emily Estefan (Emilio & Gloria Estefan's daughter on guitar)
- Enrique Iglesias
- Fernando Villalona
- Flex
- Fonseca
- Gloria Trevi
- Jencarlos Canela
- Johnny Pacheco
- Jorge Celedón
- Jorge Moreno
- Jorge Villamizar
- Joselyn Rivera
- La Arrolladora Banda El Limón
- Kat DeLuna
- K-Paz de la Sierra
- Lena Burke
- Lucero
- Luz Rios
- Marc Anthony
- Miguel Bosé
- Milly Quezada
- Montez de Durango
- Ojeda
- Patricia Manterola
- Rey Ruiz
- Sergio Mayer
- Wisin & Yandel

== Track listings ==
iTunes Digital Download

1. "Somos el Mundo 25 por Haiti" (song) — 6:49
2. "Somos el Mundo 25 por Haiti" (video) — 7:00

== Awards ==
=== Premio Juventud ===
Year	Nominee / work	Award	Result
2010	Somos El Mundo	La Combinacion Perfecta (The Perfect Combination)	Won

== Charts ==
Chart (2010)	Peak position
Spain (PROMUSICAE)	31
US Bubbling Under Hot 100 Singles	15
