= Ana Bárbara (album) =

Studio album by Ana Bárbara
- Released: September 23, 1994
- Recorded: 1994
- Genre: Regional Mexican
- Length: 32:39
- Label: Fonovisa

Ana Bárbara chronology
Ana Bárbara (1994)	La Trampa (1995)

Ana Bárbara is the debut album by Mexican singer Ana Bárbara, released in 1994. The songs were recorded in various styles that were very popular in the regional Mexican world at the time, such as tejano, grupero and technobanda. Barbara was nominated for a Premio Lo Nuestro Award in two Regional Mexican categories, including Best New Artist. She won her first Premio Furia Musical Award for Best New Artist.

== Commercial performance ==
Professional ratings
Review scores
Source	Rating
Allmusic	3/5 stars

The album was well received by critics on AllMusic who gave them a 3 star rating while the public gave it a 5 star rating. The album sold 100,000 copies.

== Track listing ==
1. "Nada" (Aníbal Pastor) – 3:29
2. "Todo Lo Aprendí De Ti" (Pastor) – 3:03
3. "Pideme Perdon" (Pastor) – 3:04
4. "Al Olvido" (Joan Sebastían) – 3:29
5. "Sacúdeme" (Orlando Jimenez, Dino Santos) – 3:16
6. "Necesito Olvidarte" (Roberto Bellester) – 3:32
7. "Gracias Por Tu Adios" (Edwin Crespo Alvarado) – 3:39
8. "Nostalgia" (Pastor) – 3:15
9. "Querer Es Como Te Quise" (Arturo Rodríguez) – 3:35
10. "Como El Azucar De Caramelo" (Alvarado) – 2:27

== Personnel ==
- Ana Barbara – vocals

== Singles ==
- From the album Ana Bárbara:
  - "Nada"
  - "Sacúdeme"
  - "Todo Lo Aprendí De Ti"
