= Mariana Esta De Fiesta... Atrévete!!! =

Studio album by Mariana Seoane
- Released: 2007
- Genre: Pop
- Label: Fonovisa

Mariana Seoane chronology
Con Sabor A... Mariana (2006)	Mariana Esta De Fiesta... Atrévete!!! (2007)	Que No Me Faltes Tú Y Muchos Éxitos Más (2007)

Singles from Mariana Esta De Fiesta... Atrévete!!!
- 1. "Atrévete A Mirarme De Frente"; 2. "Mil Horas"

Mariana Esta De Fiesta... Atrévete!!! is the fourth album by the Mexican singer Mariana Seoane, released in 2007.

== Track listing ==
1. Atrévete A Mirarme De Frente
2. Los Domingos
3. Llorando Se Fue
4. A Mover La Colita
5. Mil Horas
6. Cosita Linda
7. El Canalla
8. Caballo Viejo
9. Que No Quede Huella (feat. José Guadalupe Esparza)
10. La Hierba Se Movía
11. Fiesta
12. Cosas del Amor (feat. Margarita "La Diosa de la Cumbia")
13. Atrévete A Mirarme De Frente (Grupera)
14. Atrévete A Mirarme De Frente (Pop)
