= Pipo =

Pipo is a masculine given name. Notable people with the name include:

- Pipo (actor) (1933–1998), Mexican actor
- Pipo Mancera (1930–2011), Argentine television presenter
- Pipo Nguyen-duy (born 1962), Vietnamese photographer
- Pipo of Ozora (1369–1426), Italian soldier
- Pipo (footballer, born 1992), Portuguese football forward
- Ale Pipo (born 1994), Spanish football attacking midfielder
- Pipo (footballer, born 1997), Spanish football midfielder
- Edmundo "Pipo" Rada (died 2019), Venezuelan politician
- Pipo de Clown, a Dutch television character
