= Mariana Seoane =

Mexican actress, model, and singer (born 1976)

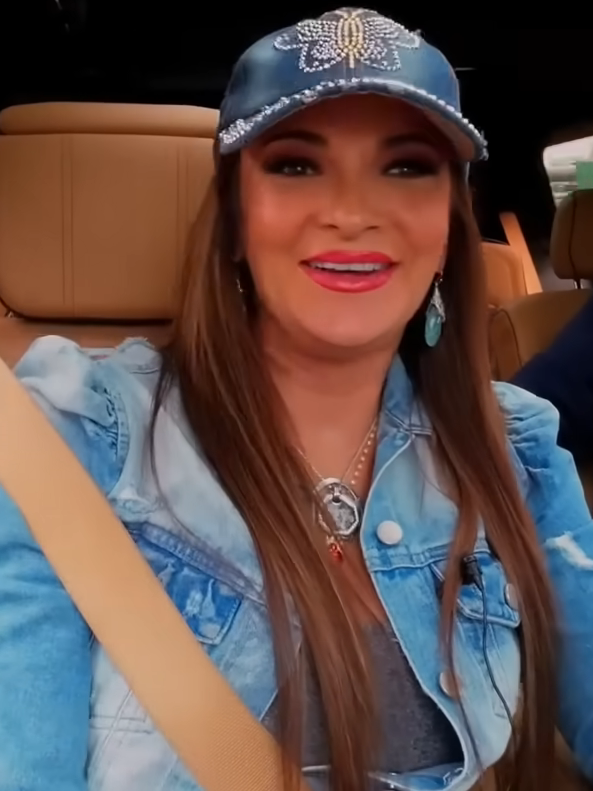
- Seoane in 2025
- Born: Mariana Alejandra Seoane García; June 10, 1976 (age 50); Mexico City
- Occupations: Actress; model; singer
- Years active: 1995–present

Mariana Seoane (born Mariana Alejandra Seoane García on June 10, 1976, in Mexico City, Mexico) is a Mexican actress, model and singer.

== Biography ==
Seoane was born June 10, 1976, from an Argentinian mother and a Cuban-Mexican father, Seoane began acting and singing professionally as a teenager.

In 1995, Seoane made her acting debut on a Televisa telenovela, when she appeared on Retrato de Familia ("Family Photo"), alongside Alfredo Adame, Helena Rojo and Julio Bracho. Seoane played Aracely in Retrato de Familia. During 1996, Seoane played Sandra in Los Hijos de Nadie ("Nobody's Children"), where she acted with Puerto Rican Osvaldo Ríos.

Seoane then acted in Cancion de Amor ("Love Song"), a telenovela geared towards teenagers and young adults. In it, she shared credits with young actors Eduardo Capetillo, Jorge Salinas and Mauricio Islas, as well as with veterans Joaquín Cordero, Guillermo García Cantú, Lorena Rojas and Jaime Garza. Seoane played Roxana in Cancion de Amor.

Seoane continued on with her acting career in 1997, when she filmed Mi Pequeña Traviesa ("My Little Daredevil"), with Anahí, Rafael Inclan, Enrique Rocha and future spouses Hector Soberon and Michelle Vieth. Having given life to the character of Bárbara in that telenovela, Seoane then took a two-year lay-off from telenovelas. She returned in 1999, as Adriana in Amor Gitano ("Gypsy Love"), where Islas was her co-star.

Seoane also acted in Tres Mujeres ("Three Women") that year, sharing the scene with Laura Flores as well as Dominika Paleta, Eduardo Verastegui and future husband and wife Bobby Larios and Niurka Marcos. Seoane played Marcela Duran in Tres Mujeres.

After a two-year hiatus from television, Seoane returned in 2001, making her comedy debut in Diseñador, Ambos Sexos ("Designer of both Sexes") a comedy about a fashion designer who pretended to be homosexual in order to get close to women. Seoane played Ernestina Soto in Atrévete a Olvidarme ("Dare to Forget Me"), a telenovela which was also run during 2001, with Jorge Salinas and Adriana Fonseca as stars.

In 2003, Seoane portrayed Rebeca Linares in Venevision's production, Rebeca. Seoane then recorded her first album, which was released during 2004. Sere Una Niña Buena ("I'll be a Good Girl"), which peaked at number 42 in the Top Latin Album in Billboard. Her first single peaked at number 18 in the Hot Latin Tracks. Que no me faltes tu was her second single, which peaked at number 6 in the Hot Latin Tracks.

Her second album was released in 2005, La nina buena ("The Good Girl"), it peaked number 38 in the Top Latin Albums in Billboard and the first single, Una de dos, reached number 22 in the Hot Latin Track; her second single was No vuelvo mas, which peaked 42 in the Hot Latin Tracks. In 2006 she released Con Sabor a... Mariana; the first single of this album was Mermelada. This album was less successful than the two previous albums. In 2007 she released Mariana esta de fiesta... atrevete, and the single was Atrevete. In 2010 she released a new song "Loca" for telenovela Mar de Amor. In 2012 Mariana released her fifth album La Malquerida with singles "La Malquerida" and "Nadie me lo conto".

In 2006 Seoane appeared on the telenovela, La fea más bella as Karla, who falls in love with Fernando Mendiola, played by Jaime Camil. In late 2007, Seoane played an evil villain in Juan Osorio's telenovela Tormenta en el Paraiso. In November 2009, she starred in Nathalie Lartilleux's telenovela Mar de Amor. In 2012, she starred as Rebecca Oropeza Pérez, the main antagonist in Por ella soy Eva. In 2013, she starred in the telenovela La tempestad as Úrsula Maya, one of the series' main antagonists. In 2014, she played Silvana Blanco, the main female antagonist in the telenovela Hasta el fin del mundo.

In October 2020, She participated on the Spanish version of “The Masked Singer”, ¿Quién es la máscara? on the 2nd Season as a Mouse, and was eliminated on the 1st Episode.

== Discography ==
- Seré Una Niña Buena (2004)
- La Niña Buena (2005)
- Con Sabor A... Mariana (2006)
- Mariana Esta De Fiesta... Atrévete!!! (2007)
- Que No Me Faltes Tú Y Muchos Éxitos Más (2007)
- La Malquerida (2012)

== Filmography ==
Year	Title	Role	Notes
1995–1996	Retrato de familia	Araceli	
1996	Canción de amor	Roxana	
1997	Los hijos de nadie	Sandra	
1997	Mi pequeña traviesa	Bárbara	
1999	Amor gitano	Adriana	
1999	Tres mujeres	Marcela Durán	
2001	Mujer, casos de la vida real	Unknown role	Episode: "Alas rotas"
2001	Atrévete a olvidarme	Ernestina Soto	
2003	Rebeca	Rebeca Linares	
2006–2007	La fea más bella	Karla	
2007–2008	Tormenta en el paraíso	Maura Durán	
2008–2009	Mañana es para siempre	Chelsy	
2009	Adictos	Carla	5 episodes
2009	Los simuladores	Lorena	2 episodes
2009–2010	Mar de amor	Oriana Parra-Ibáñez Briceño	165 episodes
2010–2011	Los héroes del Norte	Mariana	2 episodes
2012	Por ella soy Eva	Rebeca Oropeza	
2013	La Tempestad	Úrsula Mata	
2014–2015	Hasta el fin del mundo	Silvana Blanco	
2016–2017	El Chema	Mabel Castaño	47 episodes
2017	El Señor de los Cielos	Mabel Castaño / Ninón De La Ville	52 episodes
2018	El Recluso	Roxana Castañeda	13 episodes
2019	Preso No. 1	Pía Bolaños	
2021	La suerte de Loli	Melissa Quintero	Main cast
2023	Tierra de esperanza	Bernarda Rangel	Main cast

== Awards and nominations ==
=== Premios Furia Musical ===
Year	Category	Result
2004	Revelation Popular	Won
2005	Female singer of the year	Won

=== Premio Lo Nuestro 2004 ===
Year	Category	Result
2004	Revelation Popular	Won

=== Premios Oye ===
Year	Category	Result
2004	Revelation Popular	Nominated

=== Latin Grammy Award ===
Year	Category	Album	Result
2004	Best Grupero Album	Seré Una Niña Buena	Nominated

=== Premios People en Español ===
Year	Category	Nominated work	Result
2012	Best Female Antagonist	Por Ella Soy Eva	Nominated

=== TVyNovelas Awards ===
Year	Category	Nominated work	Result
2000	Best Female Revelation	Amor Gitano	Nominated
2004	Launching of the Year		Won
2013	Best Female Antagonist	Por Ella Soy Eva	Nominated

=== Premios Tu Mundo ===
Year	Category	Nominated work	Result
2017	Favorite Actress	El Chema	Nominated
2017	Best Telenovela Couple (with Mauricio Ochmann)	El Chema	Nominated
