= Los Guardianes del Amor =

Former Mexican Grupero Band

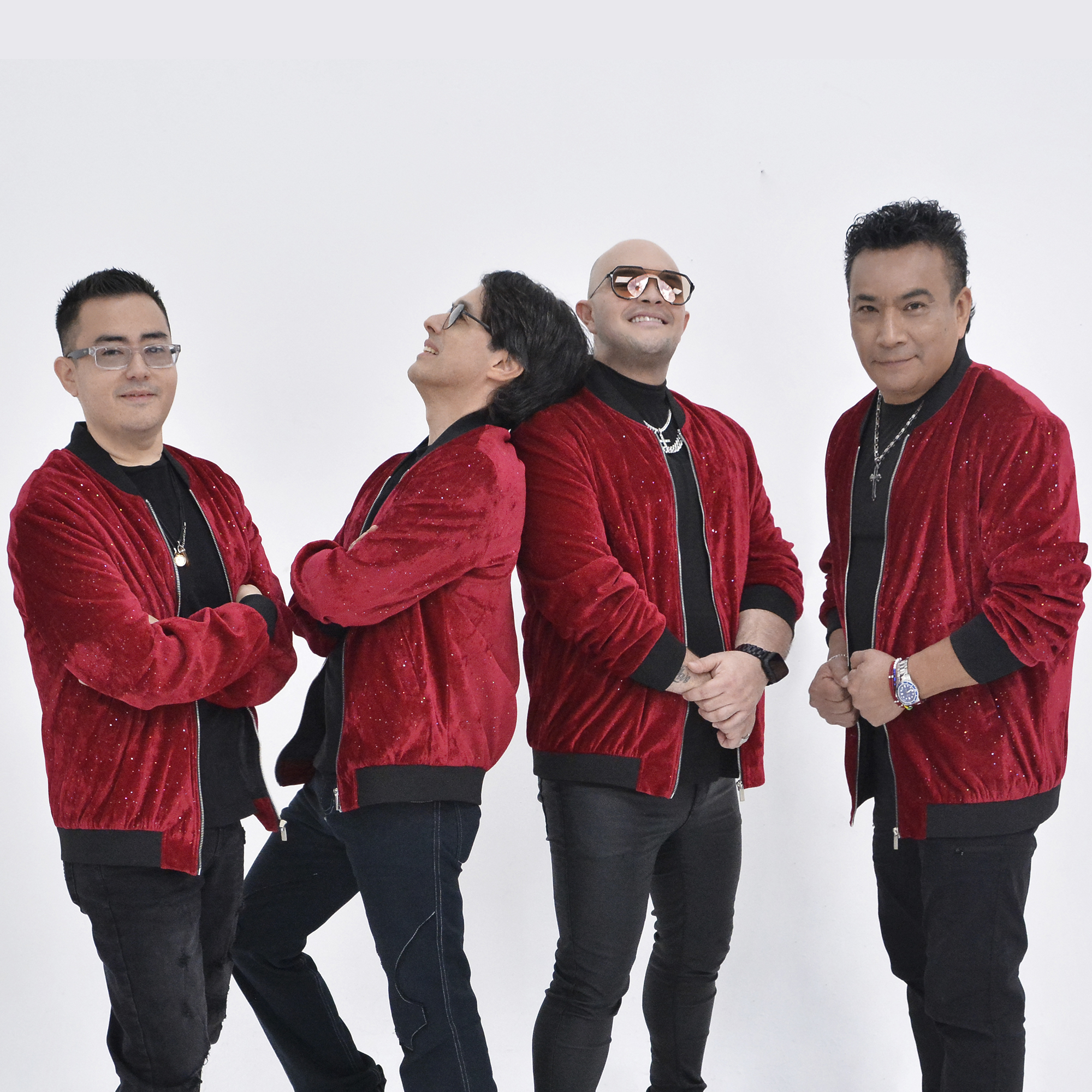
Los Guardianes del Amor

Los Guardianes del Amor are a Mexican band formed in 1992. They were the grupero act with the most nominations for Latin Grammy Award for Best Grupero Album with five, but have never won the award. The band's five original members are Arturo Rodríguez, Óscar Saúl Cervantes, Daniel Poplawsky, Pablo Calderón and Ernesto García.

In 2014, the lead singer, Arturo Rodríguez, left the band and started his own band called "Guardianes del Amor de Arturo Rodríguez".

Los Guardianes del Amor is now separated as of the end of 2014, but continues to tour and record as two separate bands under the same name with original band members Oscar, Pablo and new members. Ernesto Gracia does not tour with them anymore as of 2017, since he created his own new group called "La Casetera", but is still active behind the scenes as a producer.

== Discography ==
=== Albums ===
1993 - Cuatro Palabras

- 01 - Los Ángeles Lloran
- 02 - Amor se Escribe con Llanto
- 03 - Cuatro Palabras
- 04 - No se te Hizo
- 05 - Chiquitita
- 06 - Azúcar
- 07 - Mi Gran Amor y un Amigo
- 08 - Historia de un Amor
- 09 - Piscatungaita
- 10 - Déjame Secar tus Lágrimas
- 11 - Soledad
- 12 - Mamá Soltera

1995 - Camino al Cielo

- 01 - Corazón Romántico
- 02 - Adiós para Salvar tu Honor
- 03 - Qué Daría Yo
- 04 - Ya lo sé Todo
- 05 - Canción Inconclusa
- 06 - Muchachita
- 07 - En el Nombre del Padre
- 08 - Para que no me Olvides
- 09 - Para qué Quiero un Corazón
- 10 - No Debí Dejarte ir
- 11 - No Puedo Más
- 12 - Adiós con Adiós se Paga
- 13 - Propiedad Privada
- 14 - Un Amor Entre Dos

1996 - Por Siempre y Para Siempre

- 01 - El Perro, el Gato y Yo
- 02 - Ella
- 03 - Quien Como Tú
- 04 - Soledad
- 05 - Jardin de Rosas
- 06 - Me Voy a Enamorar
- 07 - Que te Perdone Dios
- 08 - No somos Nada
- 09 - Cuando Dije que te Amaba
- 10 - Que Difícil Es
- 11 - Pajarillo
- 12 - Aleluya por tu Llegada
- 13 - Tus Guardianes
- 14 - Voy a Cantar por no Llorar

1997 - Te Amo Todavía

- 01 - Cien Abriles
- 02 - El Hechizo
- 03 - Enséñame a Olvidarte
- 04 - Si Quieres Verme Llorar
- 05 - Que la Gente Juzgue
- 06 - Quisiera que Fuera un Sueño
- 07 - El Regreso de su Amor
- 08 - Si me Ves Llorar
- 09 - Te Amo Todavía
- 10 - En tu Sonrisa
- 11 - Bésame un Poquito más
- 12 - Aquel Diario

1998 - Lo más Romántico de Ayer con los Más Románticos de Hoy

- 01 - Palabras Tristes
- 02 - Serenata Sin Luna
- 03 - Me Siento Solo
- 04 - Esclavo y Amo
- 05 - Nunca Más Podré Olvidarte
- 06 - Y Volveré
- 07 - Una Lágrima y un Recuerdo
- 08 - Dame un Beso y Dime Adiós
- 09 - Deja de Llorar Chiquilla
- 10 - Lágrimas Amargas
- 11 - Yo Se Que Te Acordarás
- 12 - A Que le Tiramos
- 13 - Debut y Despedida
- 14 - Titanic (mi Alma te Seguirá)

1999 - Un Pedazo de Luna

- 01 - Principio o Fin
- 02 - Mi Tesoro
- 03 - Sin Despedirnos
- 04 - Quítame la Libertad
- 05 - Niña
- 06 - Que Mal me Pagas
- 07 - Un Pedazo de Luna
- 08 - Mi Razón de Vivir
- 09 - Quiero Perder la Memoria
- 10 - Si No Regresas
- 11 - Contigo
- 12 - Por Siempre y Para Siempre

2000 - Éxitos en Vivo

- 01 - Presentación
- 02 - Para Que Quiero un Corazón
- 03 - Los Angeles Lloran
- 04 - Quien Como Tú
- 05 - El Perro, El Gato y Yo
- 06 - El Hechizo
- 07 - Chiquitita
- 08 - Popurrí - Yo Sé Que Te Acordarás - Deja de Llorar Chiquilla
- 09 - Principio o Fin
- 10 - Mi Corazón Continuará (My Heart Will Go On)
- 11 - Si No Regresas
- 12 - Cien Abriles
- 13 - Amor se Escribe con Llanto
- 14 - Palabras Tristes
- 15 - Corazón Romántico
- 16 - Cuatro Palabras
- 17 - Yerba Mala

2000- Un Millón de Lágrimas

- 01 - Me Falta Valor
- 03 - Llevatela (mi Amigo)
- 04 - Te Busco
- 05 - Tu Angel Guardian
- 06 - Para Volver a Amarte
- 07 - Sospechas de Mi
- 08 - Sabes
- 09 - No Vivo Más Din Ti
- 10 - Hoy Te Quiero Tanto

2001- Muriendo de Frio

- 01 - Te Extraño
- 02 - En un Rincón del Cielo
- 03 - Lloro
- 04 - Muriendo de Frío
- 05 - Quisiera
- 06 - Olvidando
- 07 - Después de un Mal Amor
- 08 - Te Sigo Amando
- 09 - Tengo Que Olvidarte
- 10 - Abre tu Corazón

2002- Me Enamoré de un Ángel

- 01 - Como Yo te Amo
- 02 - Te he Querido Olvidar
- 03 - Dímelo
- 04 - Para que Baile mi Pueblo
- 05 - El Resto de mi Vida
- 06 - Me Enamoré de un Ángel
- 07 - Dejamos Morir el Amor
- 08 - Quien va a Decir Adiós
- 09 - No le Digas
- 10 - Globo sin Gas
- 11 - La Noche no Basta
- 12 - Vuelvo a Decir te Amo
- 13 - Te he Querido Olvidar (Versión Salsa)
- 14 - Te he Querido Olvidar (Versión Cumbia)
- 15 - Te he Querido Olvidar (Serenata)

2004- Olvidarte Nunca

- 01 - Bebiendo Lágrimas
- 02 - Corazón en Ruinas
- 03 - Uno, Dos, Tres
- 04 - Si me Enamoro más
- 05 - Olvidarte Nunca
- 06 - Cuando tus Besos Vuelvan
- 07 - Perdóname (por no Saber Decir te Amo)
- 08 - Amores Idos
- 09 - No Podría Olvidarte Jamás
- 10 - La Carta (Una Carta)
- 11 - Bebiendo Lágrimas (Versión Romántica)

2006 - Decórame el Corazón

- 01 - Decórame el Corazón
- 02 - No Soy Perfecto
- 03 - Basta de Lágrimas
- 04 - Dividido
- 05 - Ella se Fue
- 06 - Quiero Ser Yo
- 07 - Solo los Tontos Lloran
- 08 - La Chica es Para Mi
- 09 - Otro Amor Igual
- 10 - Dinamita Pura
- 11 - No Soy Perfecto (Balada)

2008 - Amor No Me Ignores

- 01 - La Niña Está Triste
- 02 - Amor No Me Ignores
- 03 - Quiero Dormir Cansado
- 04 - Desde que Tú te Has Ido
- 05 - Insaciable Amante
- 06 - Déjame Llorar
- 07 - Amohada
- 08 - Estabas Tan Linda
- 09 - Vivir Sin Aire
- 10 - Locura Automática

2010 - Mis Favoritas

- 01 - El Perro, el Gato y Yo
- 02 - Cuatro Palabras
- 03 - Corazón Romántico
- 04 - Sin Despedirnos
- 05 - Yo Sé Que Te Acordarás
- 06 - Cien Abriles
- 07 - Principio O Fin
- 08 - Palabras Tristes
- 09 - Si Quieres Verme Llorar
- 10 - Ya Lo Sé Todo
- 11 - El Hechizo
- 12 - Mi Tesoro
- 13 - Muchachita
- 14 - Amor Se Escribe Con Llanto

2010 - Tesoros de Colección

Disc 1

- 01. Adiós con Adiós Se Paga
- 02. Amor Se Escribe con Llanto
- 03. Cien Abriles
- 04. Cuando Dije Que Te Amaba
- 05. Cumbia Si Me Ves Llorar
- 06. Debut y Despedida
- 07. El Regreso de Su Amor
- 08. No Somos Nada
- 09. Mi Gran Amor y un Amigo
- 10. Me Siento Solo
- 11. Pajarillo
- 12. Quiero Perder la Memoria
- 13. Soledad
- 14. Un Pedazo de Luna
- 15. Una Lágrima y un Recuerdo

Disc 2

- 01. Palabras Tristes
- 02. Cuatro Palabras
- 03. Mi Tesoro
- 04. El Perro, el Gato y Yo
- 05. Voy a Cantar Por No Llorar
- 06. Aleluya Por Tu Llegada
- 07. Aquel Diario
- 08. Azúcar
- 09. Bésame un Poquito Más
- 10. Dejame Secar Tus Lágrimas
- 11. Jardin de Rosas
- 12. Lágrimas Amargas
- 13. Los Angeles Lloran
- 14. Mamá Soltera
- 15. No Se Te Hizo
