= Seré Una Niña Buena =

Studio album by Mariana Seoane
- Released: February 24, 2004
- Genre: Grupero
- Label: Universal Music
- Producer: Adolfo Angel

Mariana Seoane chronology
Seré Una Niña Buena (2004)	La Niña Buena (2005)

Singles from Seré Una Niña Buena
- 1. "Me Equivoqué"; 2. "Que No Me Faltes Tú"

Seré Una Niña Buena is the first studio album by the Mexican singer Mariana Seoane. It was released in 2004, and it was nominated for Best Grupero Album at the Latin Grammy Awards of 2004. In 2003, Seoane was offered her second starring role on a telenovela, when she participated as Rebeca Linares in Venevision's production, Rebeca. Seoane then recorded the album that became a mild success in Seoane's career. It peaked at number 42 in the Billboard Top Latin Album chart. The lead single "Me Equivoqué" peaked at number 18 in the Billboard Hot Latin Tracks Chart, and "Que no me faltes tú", the second single, was more successful, peaking at number 6 in the Hot Latin Tracks chart.

== Track listing ==
1. Que No Me Faltes Tú
2. Me Equivoqué
3. Que Mal Elegiste
4. Como Un Fantasma
5. Déjalo
6. Dime Corazón
7. Mi Gran Noche
8. Pa' Que Sientas Lo Que Siento
9. Propiedad Privada
10. Yo Necesito Un Par
11. Me Equivoqué (Pop)
12. Me Equivoqué (Norteña)
13. Me Equivoqué (Salsa)

== Sales and certifications ==
Region	Certification	Certified units/sales
United States (RIAA)	Platinum (Latin)	100,000^{^}
^{^} Shipments figures based on certification alone.
