= Nydia Rojas =

American singer

- Born: 1980 (age 45–46); Whittier, California, United States
- Genres: Jazz; soul; R&B; Mexican folk
- Occupation: Singer
- Years active: 1994–present

Nydia Rojas (born 1980) is an American singer who performs in a wide range of musical styles such as jazz, soul, and R&B, but makes a particular specialty of Mexican folk music.

== Early life and education ==
Rojas was born in Whittier, California. Rojas spent several years of her early childhood in Guadalajara, Mexico, where she was exposed to local musical styles which greatly influenced her later career.

At age 9, her first public performance took place at an East Los Angeles marketplace named El Mercadito, which marked the albeit small beginning of her public performing career. That same year, she performed at a retirement home in Guadalajara, Jalisco, and the following year, at age 10, she embarked on regular gigs at several Mexican restaurants in the Los Angeles area. Initially she sang with a mariachi group which already performed at the restaurant, but soon she was in demand in her own right. In this context, she accepted requests for songs from restaurant patrons, arranging to learn them for the following week if songs were requested with which she was unfamiliar. Her popularity steadily grew within the musical communities of Los Angeles.

Rojas attended Los Altos High School in Hacienda Heights, California as well as Orange County High School of the Arts in Santa Ana, California. She was also involved with the Mariachi Heritage Society Program based in East Los Angeles. Her first violin and guitar instructor was Laura Sobrino, a pioneer female mariachi musician. Another mentor of Rojas's was José Hernández, founder of Mariachi Sol de Mexico, who also produced her debut album. She briefly studied voice with Heriberto Molina (El Cura), one of the original members of the Mariachi Vargas De Tecalitlán.

== Career ==
At age 13, Rojas became a vocalist/guitarist with the all-female Mariachi Reyna de Los Angeles, which provided a springboard for her to gain a solo contract with the Arista Latin recording label. Her debut solo album, self-titled, was recorded when she was 15 years of age then released after her 16th birthday. She began to set a pace for mariachi music for younger generations in the U.S.

Rojas was invited to perform for President Clinton during his re-election inauguration, and later that year, she was declared a mariachi sensation by USA Today. In the next five years another three solo albums followed. During this time, her performances played to packed audiences of up to 18,000 fans. At the 9th Lo Nuestro Awards, Rojas was nominated for Female Regional Mexican Artist of the Year.

Rojas's third album, Si Me Conocieras, was nominated for a Latin Grammy Award alongside such established artists as Vicente Fernández and Alejandro Fernández, and Antonio and Pepe Aguilar. It further established her as an outstanding performer in her field, and soon after this, she went on two national tours with Juan Gabriel. The first tour gave her the opportunity to work closely with Gabriel who expressed much admiration for her talent, and led to her recording her fourth solo album, Nydia, which for the first time took more of a mainstream Latin pop direction while still displaying all of Rojas's musical skills. Gabriel sang two duets with Rojas on this album and named her one of the best interpreters of his music from her generation.

In November 2008, Rojas reunited with Gabriel for a performance at the Auditorio Nacional de Mexico.

In May 2011, Rojas embarked on a tour with Vicente Fernández.

== Personal life ==
Rojas's mother, Olivia, was born in Guadalajara, Jalisco. Rojas's father, Arturo, was a first generation Cuban-American. Rojas's most recent album was dedicated to him after his passing in the year 2000. In 2008, Rojas married Cuban drummer, Raul Pineda. They currently live in Los Angeles with their two children.

== Discography ==
=== Albums ===
- Nydia Rojas (1996) Arista Latin
- Florecer (1997) Arista Latin
- Si Me Conocieras (1999) Hollywood Records
- Nydia (2001) Hollywood Records

=== Singles ===
Incomplete single discography.

- "La Número Uno" ("The Tide is High")
- "No Vale la Pena" (2001) — #9 (US Hot Latin Tracks), #15 (Latin Pop Airplay), #23 (Latin Tropical/Salsa Airplay), #28 (Latin Regional Mexican Airplay).
