= Diana Reyes =

Musical artist (born 1979)

- Also known as: La Reina del Pasito Duranguense
- Born: Diana Polanco Reyes; November 18, 1979 (age 46)
- Origin: La Paz, Baja California Sur, Mexico
- Genres: Regional Mexican
- Occupation: Singer
- Instrument: Vocals
- Labels: Universal Latino; Capitol Latin; DR Promotions, Inc.
- Website: dianareyes.net

Diana Reyes (born November 18, 1979) is a Mexican singer.

Reyes was born in La Paz, Baja California Sur, and her family hailed from Sinaloa. She has released three gold records since 2004: La Reina del Pasito Duranguense, Las No. 1 de la Reina, and Te Voy a Mostrar. Reyes has strong ties to her father's native state of Sinaloa and her mother's native Sonora.

== Discography ==
=== Albums ===
- 2001: La Socia
- 2004: Diana Reyes
- 2005: La Reina del Pasito Duranguense
- 2005: Navidad Duranguense
- 2006: Las No. 1 de la Reina
- 2007: Te Voy a Mostrar
- 2008: Insatisfecha
- 2008: Grandes Exitos
- 2008: Juntos Cruzando Fronteras
- 2009: Edición Limitada De Lujo
- 2009: Nacimos Para Amarnos
- 2009: Sin Remordimientos
- 2009: Vamos a Bailar
- 2010: Ámame, Bésame
- 2011: Ajustando Cuentas
- 2015: Yo No Creo en los Hombres
