= La Trampa (album) =

Studio album by Ana Bárbara
- Released: July 18, 1995
- Recorded: 1995
- Genres: Regional Mexican, Latin pop
- Label: Fonovisa
- Producer: Anibal Pastor

Ana Bárbara chronology
Ana Bárbara (1994)	La Trampa (1995)	Ay, Amor (1996)

Singles from La Trampa
- 1. "La Trampa" Released: 1995; 2. "No Se Que Voy Hacer" Released: 1995; 3. "Me Asusta, Pero Me Gusta" Released: 1996

Professional ratings
Review scores
Source	Rating
Allmusic	3.5/5 stars

La Trampa is the second studio album by Mexican singer Ana Bárbara, released in 1995.La The album peaked at number 44 on the U.S. Billboard Top Latin Albums chart.

== Track listing ==
1. "La Trampa"
2. "Olvidame Si Puedes"
3. "Me Asusta, Pero Me Gusta"
4. "Sueños de Maria"
5. "Amor de Luna"
6. "Recuerdas, Mi Amor?"
7. "No Se Que Voy a Hacer"
8. "Salte de Mi"
9. "Si Tu Quieres Ser Feliz aka Disco Cumbia"
10. "Otro Corazon"
11. "Sin Mentiras"

== Chart performance ==
Chart (1995)	Peak position
U.S. Billboard Top Latin Albums	44
