= Grupo Límite =

Mexican band

Grupo LMT
- Also known as: LMT; Límite; Los Niños De Oro
- Origin: Monterrey, Nuevo León, Mexico
- Genres: Norteño, Tejano, Latin pop, country, grupero
- Years active: 1994–2003, 2005 - Present (as LMT)
- Label: Universal Music Latino
- Past members: Beatriz Alejo Jiménez; Luis Mario Garza; Alicia Villarreal; Liz Villanueva

LMT, Grupo Límite, or Límite, is a Mexican Norteño band formed in Monterrey, Nuevo León, Mexico in 1994. The group was led by singer Alicia Villarreal until she left to pursue a solo career.

== History ==
The band debuted in 1995 with the record, Por Puro Amor (sung by Beatriz Alejo Jiménez) , which sold over a million copies. The album featured singles such as "Vete", "Quiero", and "Te Aprovechas." Other subsequent albums were successful. At the 9th Lo Nuestro Awards, Límite received two awards: Regional Mexican Group of the Year and New Artist. The group's sound and look sparked a wave of copycats in Tejano & Norteño music. Grupo Límite's lead singer/songwriter Alicia Villarreal had her own catch phrase, a flirty "ah-hah", which quickly became part of the groups mystique, in addition to her blonde braids.

== Members ==
- Johanna Maldonado - Vocalist
- Dayna Robles - Accordion
- Kimberly Hidalgo - Keyboard
- Edith Enríquez - Guitar
- Carina García - Bass guitar
- Mariah Cruz - Percussion
- Lizbeth Ríos - Drums

=== Past members ===
- Luis Mario Garza - Drums (1995-1997)
- Alicia Villarreal - Vocalist (1995-2003)

== Discography ==
Studio albums

- Por Puro Amor (1995)
- Partiéndome El Alma (1996)
- Sentimientos (1997)
- Canta con Limite (1998)
- De Corazón al Corazón (1998)
- Limite en Vivo (1999)
- Por Encima de Todo (2000)
- Soy Asi (2002)
- Otra Vez (2013)
- Tu Entretenimiento (2014)

Other albums

- En Vivo - En Concierto (1999)
- El Último Concierto en Vivo Limite (2005)
- Limite en Concierto (2007)

Collaboration albums

- El Baile del Millón (with Caballo Dorado) (1998)
- Invasores y Limite (with Los Invasores de Nuevo León) (2009)

Compilation albums

- Coleccion Mi Historia (1997)
- Serie Sensacional: La Sensación de Grupo Límite (2000)
- Serie 32 (2000)
- Edicion Limitada (2002)
- Oro Grupero (2002)
- Gracias 1995-2003 (2003)
- Encuentro Grupero (2004)
- Las 32 Mas Grandes de... (2004)
- Serie Top 10 (2004)
- Explosion de Exitos (2006)
- La Más Completa Colección (2007)
- Serie Cinco Estrellas de Oro (2008)
- La Historia de los Exitos (2008)
- La Historia de los Exitos (2008)
- Limite otra vez (2013) (ft. singer Liz Villanueva)
- 20 Kilates (2014)
