= Furia Musical =

Furia Musical was a Mexican music magazine published by Editorial Televisa, which includes articles and gossip about the famous singers in this genre.

== History and profile ==
Furia Musical was launched in Mexico City in September 1993.

The magazine had Mexico and United States editions as well as an awards show ("Premios Furia Musical") that is broadcast by Televisa, Galavisión and Univision. The US edition was published on a biweekly basis and was based in Miami, Florida. The magazine ceased publication in the U.S. with its December 2006 issue.
