= Alicia Villarreal =

Mexican singer

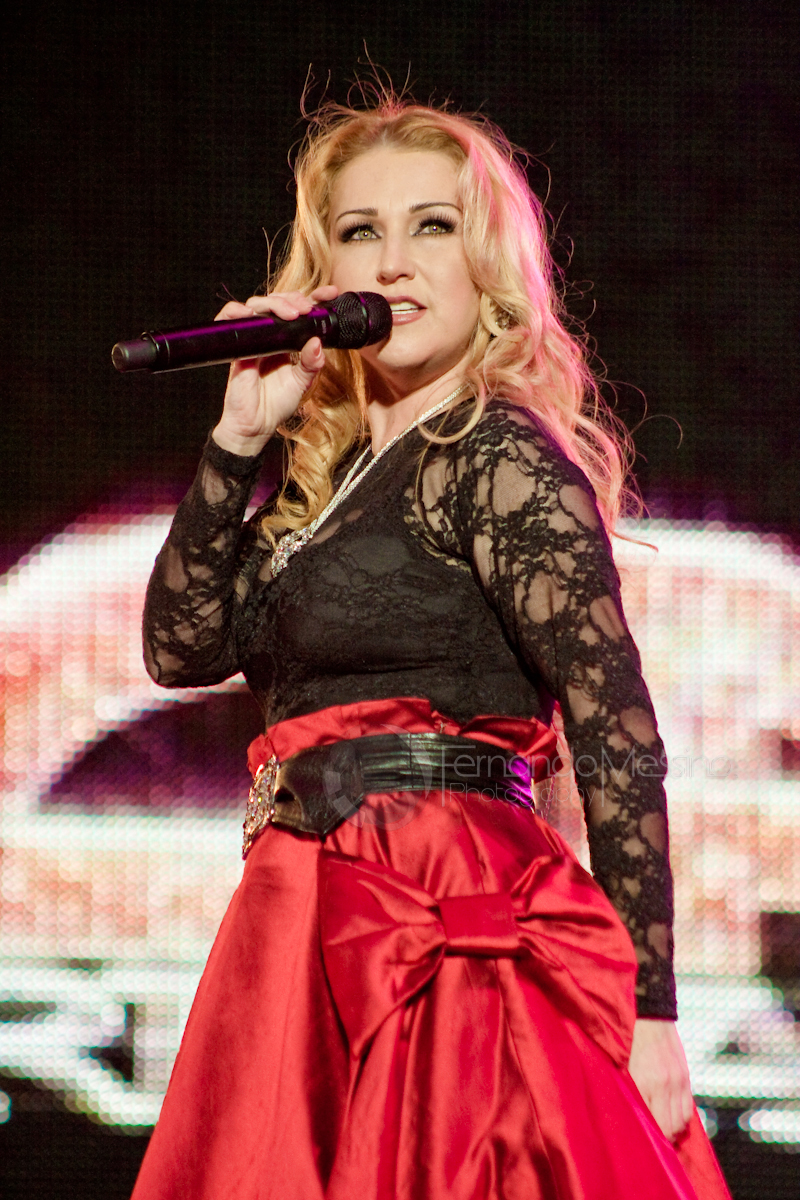
- Villarreal performing in 2010

Background information
- Born: Martha Alicia Villarreal Esparza; August 31, 1971 (age 55); San Nicolás de los Garza, Nuevo León, Mexico
- Genre: Regional Mexican
- Occupations: Singer, songwriter
- Instrument: Vocals
- Years active: 1994–2009, 2017–present
- Label: Universal
- Formerly of: Grupo Límite
- Spouse(s): Ezequiel Cuevas (m. 1991–1993) Arturo Carmona (m. 1998–2001) Cruz Martínez (m. 2003–2025)

Martha Alicia Villarreal Esparza (born August 31, 1971), known simply and professionally as Alicia Villarreal, is a Mexican singer.

Villarreal participated in different bands in Monterrey, before becoming the lead singer for Grupo Límite in 1994. After nearly eight years of success, Villarreal left the band pursuing a solo career. Villarreal released her first solo album, entitled Soy Lo Prohibido, in 2001.

Villarreal's work has garnered a Grammy nomination and two Latin Grammy Awards, one from her time with Grupo Límite and one as a solo artist.

== Biography ==
Villarreal first performed the song Mundo De Juguetes at Pipo, a local TV show her parents took her to. Her first professional performance was at a church fundraiser.

In 1995, Grupo Límite, with her as lead singer, started touring with the more famous Grupo Bronco. Among their songs were "Acariciame", "Te Aprovechas" and "Solo Contigo". Grupo Limite released six albums altogether, including a live CD recorded in Mexico City.

In 2001, Villarreal released her first solo album in the ranchera style titled Soy Lo Prohibido, which featured the hit single Te Quedo Grande la Yegua. After the success of the album, Villarreal stated she felt conflicted on how to proceed with her career due to changing genres.

In 2004, after parting ways with her bandmates, she released her second solo album entitled Cuando el Corazón se Cruza. The album was produced by her current husband, Cruz Martínez, and they wrote several of the songs together. The album has garnered her several awards.

in 2006, Villarreal performed for the highly televised Selena Vive, where she performed Si Una Vez. She later released this song along with 2 other new songs Punalada Trapera and Ya No Hay Amor on a dual disc of the album Cuando El Corazón Se Cruza. The dual disc also contained 5 remixes to her previous songs and a collection of all her music videos. The dual disc was released in Mexico in 2005.

In 2006, she released her third solo album titled Orgullo De Mujer with the lead single Insensible a Ti. The single was the theme song for the telenovela Duelo de Pasiones, on which she made her acting debut, in the role of Raquel. Orgullo de Mujer garnered a Grammy nomination for Best Mexican/Mexican-American Album.

After nearly a four-year hiatus, Villarreal announced she was in the studio recording her 4th solo album. The entitled La Jefa was released June 23, 2009, with "Caso Perdido," as lead single. The album debuted at number one on Billboard's Regional Mexican Albums and overall at number four on its Latin Albums chart. La Jefa received mixed reviews upon its release.

Nearly eight years from taking time to raise her children, Villarreal released her fifth studio album, La Villarreal on September 8, 2017.

== Personal life ==
Alicia Villarreal married her first husband, record producer Ezequiel Cuevas in 1991; they divorced in 1993.

She married Arturo Carmona on December 16, 1998. They have a daughter, Melanie Aidée Carmona Villarreal, who was born on April 10, 1999. They divorced in 2001.

She married Cruz Martínez, owner/producer of Los Super Reyes, on August 31, 2003. They have two sons, Cruz Ángelo Martínez Villarreal (born December 19, 2005) and Félix Estefano Martínez Villarreal (born February 12, 2007).

On October 10, 2009, her brother José Víctor Villarreal Esparza, who was 36 years old, died in a car accident in Monterrey, Nuevo León, Mexico.

== Discography ==
=== Studio albums ===
List of studio albums, with selected details, chart positions
Title	Album details	Peak chart positions			Certifications
Title	Album details	MEX	US	US Latin	Certifications
Soy Lo Prohibido	Release date: September 11, 2001; Label: Universal Music Mexico; Fonovisa; Format: CD, digital download	1	–	3	AMPROFON: Platinum; RIAA: 2× Platinum (Latin)
Cuando el Corazón Se Cruza	Release date: November 22, 2005; Label: Universal Music Mexico; Fonovisa; Format: CD, digital download	1	–	28	
Orgullo de Mujer	Release date: April 18, 2006; Label: Universal Music Mexico; Fonovisa; Format: CD, digital download	16	–	8	AMPROFON: Gold; RIAA: Platinum (Latin)
La Jefa	Release date: June 23, 2009; Label: Universal Music Mexico; Fonovisa; Format: CD, digital download	–	–	4	
La Villarreal	Release date: September 8, 2017; Label: Universal Music Mexico; Fonovisa; Format: CD, digital download	–	–	–	
Donde Todo Comenzó	Release date: December 6, 2024; Label: CA Mixes Records; Format: Digital download	–	–	–	
