= List of awards and nominations received by Joan Sebastian =

Joan Sebastian awards and nominations
Awards and nominations
Award	Wins	Nominations
Grammy Awards	4	6
ASCAP Awards	38	38

Joan Sebastian is a Mexican singer-songwriter who has received awards and nominations for his contributions to the music industry.

== American Society of Composers, Authors and Publishers Awards ==
The ASCAP Awards are awarded annually by the American Society of Composers, Authors and Publishers in the United States. Sebastian has received 43 awards from 43 nominations.

Year	Nominee / work	Award	Result
1996	"Aunque Me Duele el Alma"	Regional Mexican	Won
1996	"El Taxista"	Regional Mexican	Won
1997	"Duele el Amor"	Regional Mexican	Won
1999	"Por Ti"	Tex/Mex	Won
1999	"Gracias Por Tanto Amor"	Regional Mexican	Won
2000	Himself	Silver Pen Award	Won
2001	"Secreto de Amor"	Regional Mexican	Won
2002	Himself	Composers of the Year	Won
2002	"Amorcito Mio"	Regional Mexican	Won
2002	"Un Idiota"	Regional Mexican	Won
2003	Himself	Composer of the Year	Won
2003	"Manantial De Llanto"	Pop/Ballad	Won
2003	"25 Rosas"	Regional Mexican	Won
2003	"El Primer Tonto"	Regional Mexican	Won
2003	"Más Alto Que Las Aguilas"	Regional Mexican	Won
2004	Himself	Songwriters of the Year	Won
2004	"Afortunado"	Regional Mexican	Won
2004	"Hoy Empieza Mi Tristeza"	Regional Mexican	Won
2005	"Amar Como Te Amé"	Regional Mexican	Won
2006	"Y Las Mariposas"	Regional Mexican	Won
2007	Himself	Golden Note Award	Won
2007	"De Contrabando"	Regional Mexican	Won
2007	"Oiga"	Regional Mexican	Won
2008	"Eso y Más"	Regional Mexican	Won
2008	"Estos Celos"	Regional Mexican	Won
2009	Himself	Songwriters of the Year	Won
2009	"Para Siempre"	Song of the Year	Won
2009	"Para Siempre"	Regional Mexican Song of the Year	Won
2009	"Estos Celos"	Regional Mexican	Won
2009	"La Derrota"	Regional Mexican	Won
2010	Himself	Songwriters of the Year	Won
2010	"El Último Beso"	Regional Mexican	Won
2010	"Te Irá Mejor Sin Mi"	Regional Mexican	Won
2011	"Estuve"	Regional Mexican	Won
2012	"El Padrino"	Regional Mexican	Won
2012	"No La Voy a Engañar"	Regional Mexican	Won
2013	"Caminar Contigo"	Regional Mexican	Won
2013	"Diséñame"	Regional Mexican	Won
2013	"El Vestido Blanco"	Regional Mexican	Won
2014	"Que Dios Bendiga"	Regional Mexican	Won

== Billboard Latin Music Awards ==
The Billboard Latin Music Awards are awarded annually by the Billboard magazine in the United States. Sebastian has received 4 awards from 17 nominations.

Year	Nominee / work	Award	Result
2001	"Secreto de Amor"	Hot Latin Track of the Year	Nominated
2001	Secreto de Amor	Regional Mexican Album of the Year by a Male Artist	Won
2002	En Vivo: Desde la Plaza El Progreso en Guadalajara	Regional Mexican Album of the Year by a Male Artist	Nominated
2003	Lo Dijo el Corazón	Regional Mexican Album of the Year by a Male Artist	Nominated
2005	Dos Grandes (with Marco Antonio Solís)	Latin Greatest Hits Album of the Year	Won
2005	Himself	Latin Tour of the Year	Nominated
2006	Inventario	Regional Mexican Album of the Year by a Male Solo Artist	Nominated
2006	Himself	Billboard Latin Music Hall of Fame	Won
2007	"Mas Alla del Sol"	Hot Latin Song of the Year	Nominated
2007	"Mas Alla del Sol"	Regional Mexican Song of the Year by a Male Solo Artist	Nominated
2007	Mas Alla del Sol	Regional Mexican Album of the Year by a Male Solo Artist	Won
2007	Himself	Songwriter of the Year	Nominated
2009	"Aire" (with Luz Rios)	Hot Latin Vocal Collaboration Song of the Year	Nominated
2009	"Aire" (with Luz Rios)	Regional Mexican Song of the Year by a Female Solo Artist	Nominated
2009	Himself	Songwriter of the Year	Nominated
2009	Himself	Producer of the Year	Nominated
2010	Himself	Hot Latin Songs Artist of the Year, Male	Nominated
2010	Himself	Songwriter of the Year	Nominated
2012	Himself	Regional Mexican Albums Artist of the Year, Solo	Nominated

== Grammy Awards ==
The Grammy Awards are awarded annually by the National Academy of Recording Arts and Sciences in the United States. Sebastian has received four awards from six nominations.

Year	Nominee / work	Award	Result
2003	Lo Dijo el Corazón	Best Mexican/Mexican-American Album	Won
2004	Afortunado	Best Mexican/Mexican-American Album	Won
2007	Más Allá del Sol	Best Banda Album	Won
2009	No es de Madera	Best Banda Album	Won
2012	Huevos Rancheros	Best Regional Mexican Music Album (including Tejano)	Nominated
2014	13 Celebrando el 13	Best Regional Mexican Music Album (including Tejano)	Nominated

== Latin Grammy Awards ==
The Latin Grammy Awards are awarded annually by the Latin Academy of Recording Arts & Sciences in the United States. Sebastian has received

Year	Category	Work	Result	Ref.
2002	Best Grupero Album	Lo Dijo el Corazón	Won	
2003	Best Regional Mexican Song	"Afortunado"	Won	
2003	Best Banda Album	Afortunado	Won	
2006	Best Banda Album	Más Allá Del Sol	Won	
2006	Best Grupero Album	En El Auditorio Nacional	Won	
2008	Best Banda Album	No Es De Madera	Won	
2008	Best Regional Mexican Song	"Estos Celos"	Won	
2016	Best Regional Song	"Volví Pa'l Pueblo"	Nominated	

== Lo Nuestro Awards ==
The Lo Nuestro Awards are awarded annually by television network Univision in the United States. Sebastian has received thirteen awards from twenty-nine nominations.

Year	Nominee / work	Award	Result
1989	Himself	Regional Mexican Artist of the Year	Nominated
1989	Alberto Vázquez and Joan Sebastian	Pop Group of the Year	Nominated
1990	Himself	Regional Mexican Artist of the Year	Nominated
1994	Himself	Regional Mexican Male Artist of the Year	Nominated
1999	Himself	Regional Mexican Male Artist of the Year	Nominated
2001	Secreto de Amor	Regional Mexican Album of the Year	Won
2001	"Secreto de Amor"	Regional Mexican Song of the Year	Won
2001	Himself	Regional Mexican Male Artist of the Year	Nominated
2001	Himself	Grupero Artist of the Year	Won
2001	Himself	Excellence Award	Won
2002	En Vivo: Desde la Plaza El Progreso en Guadalajara		Nominated
2002	Himself	Regional Mexican Male Artist of the Year	Nominated
2002	Himself	Grupero Artist of the Year	Nominated
