= Secreto de Amor =

Secreto de Amor may refer to:

- Secreto de amor (TV series), a 2001 American telenovela
- Secreto de Amor (album), a 2000 album by Joan Sebastian
  - "Secreto de Amor" (song), a 2000 song by Joan Sebastian
- Secreto de amor (Silvia Bezi song), a 1995 song by Silvia Bezi
