= Tu cara me suena (American TV series) season 1 =

Tu cara me suena
- Season 1
- Winner: El Dasa
- No. of episodes: 6

Release
- Original network: Univision
- Original release: October 4 – November 29, 2020

Season chronology
- Next → Season 2

The first season of Tu cara me suena premiered on Univision on October 4, 2020. The series is the American Spanish-language version of the Endemol format Your Face Sounds Familiar. This season features eight celebrities that compete in a song and dance number while impersonating iconic singers. The season is hosted by Ana Brenda Contreras and Rafael Araneda. The judging panel consists of Angélica Vale, Jesús Navarro, Kany García, and Charytín Goyco.

On October 16, 2020, it was announced that production of the season was suspended due to multiple positive COVID-19 cases in its contestants. The season resumed on November 8, 2020. On November 29, 2020, El Dasa was declared the winner of the season.

== Judges ==
Celebrity	Notability (known for)
Angélica Vale	Actress, singer, comedian, radio personality
Jesús Navarro	Singer
Kany García	Singer
Charytín Goyco	Singer, TV host, actress

== Contestants ==
Celebrity	Notability (known for)	Charity
Chantal Andere	Actress	Alianza Nacional para la Salud Hispana
Gabriel Coronel	Actor, singer, model	Amigos for Kids
El Dasa	Singer	Coalition for Humane Immigrant Rights
Sandra Echeverría	Actress & singer	Joe DiMaggio Children's Hospital
Francisca Lachapel	Actress, TV host, beauty pageant	Afro-Latino Association for Policy & Advocacy
Melina León	Singer & actress	Esclerosis Múltiple de Puerto Rico
Llane	Singer	No More
Pablo Montero	Singer & actor	Carlos Rosario International Public Charter School

== Performances ==
Celebrity	Week 1	Week 2	Week 3	Week 4	Week 5: Semifinal	Week 6: Finale
Chantal Andere	Jenni Rivera	Gloria Trevi	Yuri	Rocío Jurado	Laura Pausini	Rocio Durcal
Gabriel Coronel	Maluma	Silvestre Dangond	Luis Miguel	Chayanne	Camilo Sesto	Marc Anthony
El Dasa	Marco Antonio Solís	Juan Gabriel	Pitbull	Amanda Miguel	Juan Luis Guerra	Cristian Castro
Sandra Echeverría	Shakira	Paquita la del Barrio	--	Laura León	Selena	Thalía
Francisca Lachapel	Natti Natasha	Celia Cruz	--	--	--	--
Melina León	Olga Tañón	Alejandra Guzmán	Karol G	Myriam Hernández	Gloria Estefan	La India
Llane	Marc Anthony	J Balvin	Camila	Enrique Iglesias	Alejandro Fernández	Ricky Martin
Pablo Montero	Ricardo Arjona	José Luis Rodríguez	Vicente Fernández	Elvis Presley	Julio Iglesias	Joan Sebastian

== Weekly results ==
=== Week 1: October 4 ===
Celebrity	Performance	Judges' Score				Extra Points	Total Points
Celebrity	Performance	Vale	Kany	Jesús	Chary	Extra Points	Total Points
Chantal Andere	"Ya Lo Sé" – Jenni Rivera	4	4	4	3	2	17
Llane	"Flor Pálida" – Marc Anthony	10	10	8	10	4	42
Pablo Montero	"Como Duele" – Ricardo Arjona	3	3	3	4	0	13
Francisca Lachapel	"Pa' Mala Yo" – Natti Natasha	5	5	7	8	0	25
El Dasa	"Más Que Tu Amigo" – Marco Antonio Solís	8	7	9	9	6	39
Gabriel Coronel	"Corazón" – Maluma	6	6	6	5	2	25
Melina León	"Es Mentiroso" – Olga Tañón	7	8	5	6	2	28
Sandra Echeverría	"Me Enamoré" – Shakira	9	9	10	7	0	35

Non-competition performances
Celebrity (Judge)	Performance
Charytín Goyco	"Material Girl" – Madonna
Jesús Navarro	"Lo Que No Fue No Será" – José José
Kany García	"Rehab" – Amy Winehouse
Angélica Vale	"Believe" – Cher

=== Week 2: October 11 ===
Celebrity	Performance	Judges' Score				Extra Points	Total Points
Celebrity	Performance	Vale	Kany	Jesús	Chary	Extra Points	Total Points
Melina León	"Volverte a Amar" – Alejandra Guzmán	9	9	10	9	6	43
Chantal Andere	"Todos Me Miran" – Gloria Trevi	8	7	7	8	2	32
Gabriel Coronel	"El Santo Cachón" – Silvestre Dangond	7	6	6	5	0	24
Pablo Montero	"Dueño de Nada" – José Luis Rodríguez	4	4	3	4	4	19
Sandra Echeverria	"Rata de Dos Patas" – Paquita la del Barrio	6	8	8	7	0	29
Francisca Lachapel	"La Vida Es Un Carnaval" – Celia Cruz	5	5	5	6	0	21
Llane (Note: On October 7, 2020, Llane announced that he had tested positive for COVID-19 during the COVID-19 pandemic. He performed remotely from his home.)	"Amarillo" – J Balvin	3	3	4	3	0	13
El Dasa	"Querida" – Juan Gabriel	10	10	9	10	6	45

=== Week 3: November 8 ===
Celebrity	Performance	Judges' Score				Extra Points	Total Points
Celebrity	Performance	Vale	Kany	Jesús	Chary	Extra Points	Total Points
El Dasa	"El Taxi" – Pitbull	6	5	6	6	0	23
Chantal Andere	"Detrás de Mi Ventana" – Yuri	7	8	8	9	4	36
Gabriel Coronel	"Cuando calienta el sol" – Luis Miguel	8	6	7	8	0	29
Llane	"Mientes" – Camila	9	9	9	7	2	36
Pablo Montero	"Estos Celos" – Vicente Fernández	10	10	10	10	4	44
Melina León	"Tusa" – Karol G	5	7	5	5	2	24
Sandra Echeverría	--	4	4	4	4	0	16

=== Week 4: November 15 ===
Celebrity	Performance	Judges' Score				Extra Points	Total Points
Celebrity	Performance	Vale	Kany	Jesús	Chary	Extra Points	Total Points
Sandra Echeverría	"Suavecito, Suavecito" – Laura León	7	8	9	6	2	32
Melina León	"El Hombre Que Yo Amo" – Myriam Hernández	5	4	4	10	2	25
Pablo Montero	"Jailhouse Rock" – Elvis Presley	6	5	7	5	0	23
Chantal Andere	"Lo Siento Mi Amor" – Rocío Jurado	9	9	8	8	2	36
Gabriel Coronel	"Este Ritmo Se Baila Así" – Chayanne	10	10	10	9	6	45
El Dasa	"Él Me Mintió" – Amanda Miguel	4	7	6	4	0	21
Llane	"Duele el Corazón" – Enrique Iglesias	8	6	5	7	2	28

=== Week 5: November 22 ===
Celebrity	Performance	Judges' Score				Extra Points	Total Points
Celebrity	Performance	Vale	Kany	Jesús	Chary	Extra Points	Total Points
Llane	"Hoy Tengo Ganas de Ti" – Alejandro Fernández	6	4	8	4	0	22
Pablo Montero	"Lo Mejor de Tu Vida" – Julio Iglesias	8	10	7	6	0	31
Melina León	"Samba" – Gloria Estefan	4	5	4	5	2	20
Chantal Andere	"Viveme" – Laura Pausini	10	9	10	10	2	41
Gabriel Coronel	"Perdoname" – Camilo Sesto	9	6	6	8	6	35
El Dasa	"La Bilirrubina" – Juan Luis Guerra	7	8	9	7	2	33
Sandra Echevarría	"No Me Queda Más" – Selena	5	7	5	9	2	28

== Ratings ==
Episode		Air date	Viewers (millions)
1	"Week 1"	October 4, 2020	1.40
2	"Week 2"	October 11, 2020	1.42
3	"Week 3"	November 8, 2020	1.27
4	"Week 4"	November 15, 2020	1.52
5	"Week 5"	November 22, 2020	1.52
6	"Final"	November 29, 2020	1.80
