= Tu cara me suena =

Tu cara me suena may refer to:

- Tu cara me suena (Spanish TV series), a Spanish reality competition television series where celebrity contestants impersonate singers
- Tu cara me suena (Argentine TV series), an Argentine reality competition television series based on the Spanish series
- Tu cara me suena (American TV series), an American Spanish-language reality competition television series based on the Spanish series
