= Tu cara me suena (American TV series) season 2 =

Tu cara me suena
- Season 2
- Winner: Michael Stuart
- No. of episodes: 7

Release
- Original network: Univision; Las Estrellas
- Original release: March 27 – May 8, 2022

Season chronology
- ← Previous; Season 1

The second season of Tu cara me suena premiered on Univision and Las Estrellas on March 27, 2022. The series is the American Spanish-language version of the Endemol format Your Face Sounds Familiar. This season features eight celebrities that compete in a song and dance number while impersonating iconic singers. Ana Brenda Contreras and Rafael Araneda returned as hosts. Angélica Vale and Charytín Goyco returned to the judging panel. Edén Muñoz and Víctor Manuelle joined as judges, replacing Jesús Navarro and Kany García. On May 8, 2022, Michael Stuart was declared the winner of the season.

== Judges ==
Celebrity	Notability (known for)
Angélica Vale	Actress, singer, comedian, radio personality
Charytín Goyco	Singer, TV host, actress
Edén Muñoz	Singer and songwriter
Víctor Manuelle	Singer

== Contestants ==
Celebrity	Notability (known for)	Charity
Christian Daniel	Actor and singer	Fundación Santa María de Los Ángeles
Helen Ochoa	Singer	League of United Latin American Citizens
Kika Edgar	Actress and singer	St. Jude Children's Research Hospital
Manny Cruz	Singer	UNICEF
Michael Stuart	Singer	Ola del Cielo
Ninel Conde	Singer and actress	Unidos por la Música
Sherlyn González	Actress and singer	Teletón USA
Yahir	Singer & actor	A National Latina Organization

== Performances ==
Celebrity	Week 1	Week 2	Week 3	Week 4	Week 5	Week 6: Semifinal	Week 7: Final
Christian Daniel	Farruko	José José	Rubén Blades	Justin Bieber	Ricardo Montaner	Nicky Jam	Sebastián Yatra
Helen Ochoa	Rocío Dúrcal	Lady Gaga	Alejandra Guzmán	Joan Sebastian	Meghan Trainor	Jenni Rivera	Yuri
Kika Edgar	Amanda Miguel	Mon Laferte	Paulina Rubio	Raphael	Aida Cuevas	Katy Perry	Natalia Jiménez
Manny Cruz	David Bisbal	Juan Luis Guerra	Prince Royce	Mario Domm	Chayanne	Franco De Vita	Carlos Vives
Michael Stuart	Daddy Yankee	Marc Anthony	Outkast	Samo	Pitbull	Celia Cruz	Juan Gabriel
Ninel Conde	Thalía	Jennifer Lopez	Selena	Ana Bárbara	Bad Bunny	Margarita Vargas	Gloria Trevi
Sherlyn	Karol G	Camilo	Becky G	Xuxa	Fey	Belinda	Shakira
Yahir	Alejandro Fernández	Marco Antonio Solís	Laura León	Gerardo	Roberto Carlos	Maná	Maluma

== Weekly results ==
=== Week 1: March 27 ===
Celebrity	Performance	Judges' Score				Extra Points	Total Points
Celebrity	Performance	Vale	Charytín	Víctor	Edén	Extra Points	Total Points
Helen Ochoa	"Me Gustas Mucho" – Rocío Durcal	6	5	6	7	0	24
Christian Daniel	"Pepas" – Farruko	8	8	7	6	4	33
Kika Edgar	"Así No Te Amará Jamás" – Amanda Miguel	7	6	8	8	2	31
Sherlyn	"Bichota" – Karol G	3	4	3	4	0	14
Manny Cruz	"Ave María" – David Bisbal	9	9	9	10	8	45
Ninel Conde	"Piel morena" – Thalía	5	7	4	5	0	21
Yahir	"Tantita Pena" – Alejandro Fernández	4	3	5	3	0	15
Michael Stuart	"Gasolina" – Daddy Yankee	10	10	10	9	2	41

=== Week 2: April 3 ===
Celebrity	Performance	Judges' Score				Extra Points	Total Points
Celebrity	Performance	Vale	Charytín	Víctor	Edén	Extra Points	Total Points
Yahir	"Si no te hubieras ido" – Marco Antonio Solís	7	7	5	8	0	27
Helen Ochoa	"Bad Romance" – Lady Gaga	6	3	3	6	4	22
Michael Stuart	"Ahora Quien" – Marc Anthony	5	6	8	3	2	24
Kika Edgar	"Tu falta de querer" – Mon Laferte	8	10	10	9	2	39
Manny Cruz	"El Farolito" – Juan Luis Guerra	3	4	4	4	0	15
Sherlyn	"Ropa cara" – Camilo	10	9	9	10	4	42
Christian Daniel	"Lo Pasado, Pasado" – José José	4	5	7	5	4	25
Ninel Conde	"El Anillo" – Jennifer Lopez	9	8	6	7	0	30

=== Week 3: April 10 ===
Celebrity	Performance	Judges' Score				Extra Points	Total Points
Celebrity	Performance	Vale	Charytín	Víctor	Edén	Extra Points	Total Points
Sherlyn	"Mayores" – Becky G	5	7	6	4	0	22
Christian Daniel	"Pedro Navaja" – Rubén Blades	10	9	9	8	0	36
Ninel Conde	"Amor Prohibido" – Selena	3	3	3	3	0	12
Michael Stuart	"Hey Ya!" – Outkast	9	10	10	7	6	42
Kika Edgar	"Mío" – Paulina Rubio	4	4	7	5	0	20
Helen Ochoa	"Hey Güera" – Alejandra Guzmán	8	8	8	9	10	43
Manny Cruz	"Carita de Inocente" – Prince Royce	6	6	4	6	0	22
Yahir	"Dos mujeres, un camino" – Laura León	7	5	5	10	0	27

=== Week 4: April 17 ===
Celebrity	Performance	Judges' Score				Extra Points	Total Points
Celebrity	Performance	Vale	Charytín	Víctor	Edén	Extra Points	Total Points
Yahir	"Rico Suave" – Gerardo	10	9	6	5	4	34
Helen Ochoa	"Tatuajes" – Joan Sebastian	9	8	10	10	0	37
Christian Daniel	"Yummy" – Justin Bieber	3	3	3	3	0	12
Ninel Conde	"Bandido" – Ana Bárbara	6	5	5	6	0	22
Kika Edgar	"Yo Soy Aquél" – Raphael	5	6	8	7	4	30
Manny Cruz	"Aléjate de mí" – Camila	8	10	9	9	6	42
Michael Stuart	"Aléjate de mí" – Camila	7	7	7	8	2	31
Sherlyn	"Ilariê" – Xuxa	4	4	4	4	0	16

Non-competition performances
Celebrity	Performance
Gabriel Coronel	"Hasta Que Me Olvides" – Luis Miguel

=== Week 5: April 24 ===
Celebrity	Performance	Judges' Score				Extra Points	Total Points
Celebrity	Performance	Vale	Charytín	Víctor	Edén	Extra Points	Total Points
Manny Cruz	"Torero" – Chayanne	8	8	7	7	0	30
Sherlyn	"Azúcar amargo" – Fey	5	3	4	4	0	16
Yahir	"Cama y Mesa" – Roberto Carlos	10	9	6	6	4	35
Helen Ochoa	"All About That Bass" – Meghan Trainor	4	5	8	8	2	27
Kika Edgar	"El Pastor" – Aida Cuevas	7	10	10	10	0	37
Michael Stuart	"I Know You Want Me (Calle Ocho)" – Pitbull	3	7	3	3	4	20
Christian Daniel	"Tan Enamorados" – Ricardo Montaner	6	4	5	5	0	20
Ninel Conde	"Chambea" – Bad Bunny	9	6	9	9	6	39

=== Semifinal: May 1 ===
Celebrity	Performance	Judges' Score				Extra Points	Total Points
Celebrity	Performance	Vale	Charytín	Víctor	Edén	Extra Points	Total Points
Sherlyn	"Amor a Primera Vista" – Belinda	3	4	3	4	0	14
Christian Daniel	"El Perdón" – Nicky Jam	4	3	4	3	0	14
Yahir	"Oye Mi Amor" – Maná	7	5	7	6	0	25
Manny Cruz	"Solo Importas Tú" – Franco De Vita	9	9	8	8	0	34
Helen Ochoa	"Inolvidable" – Jenni Rivera	8	8	9	9	0	34
Michael Stuart	"Oye Como Va" – Celia Cruz	10	10	10	10	14	54
Ninel Conde	"Que nadie sepa mi sufrir" – Margarita Vargas	6	7	6	7	0	26
Kika Edgar	"Roar" – Katy Perry	5	6	5	5	2	23

Non-competition performances
Celebrity	Performance
Ana Brenda Contreras & Rafael Araneda	"Mi Tierra" – Gloria Estefan & Emilio Estefan

=== Final: May 8 ===
Celebrity	Performance	Judges' Score				Extra Points	Total Points
Celebrity	Performance	Vale	Charytín	Víctor	Edén	Extra Points	Total Points
Kika Edgar	"Me Muero" – Natalia Jiménez						
Yahir	"Hawái" – Maluma						
Sherlyn	"Ciega, Sordomuda" – Shakira						
Helen Ochoa	"Es ella más que yo" – Yuri						
Christian Daniel	"Pareja del Año" – Sebastián Yatra						
Michael Stuart	"Te Sigo Amando" – Juan Gabriel						
Ninel Conde	"Pelo Suelto" – Gloria Trevi						
Manny Cruz	"Pa' Mayte" – Carlos Vives						

Non-competition performances
Celebrity	Performance
Sherlyn & Yahir	"Chantaje" – Shakira & Maluma
Michael Stuart & Kika Edgar	"Ya Lo Sé Que Tú Te Vas" – Juan Gabriel & Natalia Jiménez
Manny Cruz & Christian Daniel	"Robarte un Beso" – Carlos Vives & Sebastián Yatra
Ninel Conde	"Cómo Te Voy A Olvidar" – by Los Ángeles Azules & Gloria Trevi
Helen Ochoa	"Mis Sentimientos" – by Los Ángeles Azules & Yuri

== Ratings ==
Episode		Air date	U.S. Viewers (millions)	Mexico Viewers (millions)
1	"Week 1"	March 27, 2022	1.40	2.00
2	"Week 2"	April 3, 2022	1.40	1.70
3	"Week 3"	April 10, 2022	1.20	2.00
4	"Week 4"	April 17, 2022	1.20	1.80
5	"Week 5"	April 24, 2022	1.30	1.50
6	"Semifinal"	May 1, 2022	1.40	1.40
7	"Final"	May 8, 2022	1.40	2.10
