= La Academia 6: Última Generación =

La Academia Última Generación

La Academia Última Generación is the last generation of La Academia, according to its producer Eva Borja. Auditions were held in many cities across Mexico, Guatemala and the United States in July. The program was broadcast on Televisión Azteca for 16 weeks from August 31 to December 14, 2008.

The headmaster of La Academia is Héctor Martinez, the same of the first two generations. The teachers are almost the same of the first generation, the host is Rafael Araneda from Chile, 20 is the number of contestants who are competing in the last generation of La Academia. The finale was on December 14, 2008, where the six generations sang all together closing the show and the reality forever. The winner was 21-year-old Maria Fernanda Alvo from Guadalajara, Fabiola Rodas from Guatemala was the runner-up, Luis Armando Lozano was 3rd place, Valeria Dessens 4th place and Perla Estrada was 5th.

== Results ==
Legend
Female	Male	Top 20	Top 24

Safe	Bottom 3	Bottom 2	Eliminated	Finalist	Best of the Night

Stage:		Semi-Finals	Finals														Grand Finale
Week:		C01 08/31^{1}	C02 09/07	C03 09/14	C04 09/21	C05 09/28	C06 10/05	C07 10/12	C08 10/19	C09 10/26	C10 11/02	C11 11/09	C12 11/16	C13 11/23	C14 11/30	C15 12/07	C16 12/14
Place	Contestant	Result															
1	Maria Fernanda												B.O.N	Btm 3		Finalist	Winner
2	Fabiola Rodas											Btm 3					Runner-Up
3	Luis A. Lozano			Btm 2				Btm 3	Btm 3			Btm 3	Btm 3		B.O.N	Btm 3	3rd Place
4	Valeria Dessens														Finalist	B.O.N	4th Place
5	Perla Estrada				Btm 3	Btm 3				Btm 3				Btm 2	Btm 3	Btm 2	5th place
6	Alex Garza													B.O.N	Btm 2	Btm 2	Elim
7	Jackie González											B.O.N		Btm 3	Elim		
8	Matías Aranda													Elim			
9	Wilfredo Pineda							Btm 3	Btm 3	Btm 3	Btm 3		Btm 2	Elim			
10	Estebán Velázquez												Elim				
11	Cinthia Urtiaga					Btm 3					Btm 3	Elim					
12	Iván Estrada										Elim						
13-16	Fátima Molina									Elim							
13-16	Héctor Silva						Btm 2		Elim								
13-16	Alba Alcudia							Elim									
13-16	Gerardo Castillo						Elim										
17-20	Monserrat Monroy				Btm 3	Elim											
17-20	Dazahev López				Elim												
17-20	Alejandra Sandoval			Elim													
17-20	José Roberto Carrillo		Elim														
21-24	Sergio Castro	Elim															
21-24	Manuel Murillo	Elim															
21-24	Erik Uziel Salinas	Elim															
21-24	Flor de María	Elim															

^{1}Lyanne Rebeca García Parra was expelled before Concert 1.

== Final 20 ==
- This year, the Final 20 are composed by 11 girls and 9 guys, and as of the Final 5, there are left 4 girls and only 1 guy:

1. Maria Fernanda Alvo Díaz (María Fernanda), 21, - Jalisco Mexico
2. Jackeline Fabiola Rodas Valladares (Fabiola), 15, - Guatemala City Guatemala
3. Luis Armando Lozano Acosta (Luis Armando) A.K.A. Paolo Botti, 24, - Veracruz Mexico
4. Valeria Argentina Dessens Cerdeña(Valeria), 16, - Sonora Mexico
5. Perla Isabel Estrada Hernández (Perla), 17, - Sonora Mexico
6. Rosa Alejandra Garza Guizar(Alex), 21, - Nuevo León Mexico
7. Julia Jacqueline González Padilla (Jackie), 22, - California United States
8. Gerardo Matías Aranda García (Matías), 23, - Córdoba Argentina
9. Wilfredo Pineda Gastelum (Wilfredo), 16, - Sinaloa Mexico
10. Estebán Velázquez (Estéban), 18, - Texas United States
11. Cintia Maribel Urtiaga Peña (Cintia), 17, - Jalisco Mexico
12. Iván Estrada Quintanar (Iván), 18, Mexico City, Mexico
13. Fátima Ileana Molina Vargas (Fátima), 22, - Jalisco Mexico
14. Héctor Silva del Castillo (Héctor), 25, - Nuevo León Mexico
15. Alba del Carmen Alcudia Oriano (Alba), 15, - Tabasco Mexico
16. Gerardo Antonio Castillo Orellana (Gerardo), 22, - Guatemala City Guatemala
17. Monserrat Monroy Cruz (Monserrat), 18, - Veracruz Mexico
18. Dasahev López Saavedra (Dazahev), 19, - Sonora Mexico
19. Alejandra Sandoval Llamas (Alejandra), 15, - Jalisco Mexico
20. José Roberto Carrillo Pérez (José Roberto), 24, - Baja California Mexico

== Song list ==
Contestant	Concert 1	Concert 2	Concert 3	Concert 4	Concert 5	Concert 6	Concert 7	Concert 8	Concert 9	Concert 10	Concert 11	Concert 12	Concert 13	Concert 14	Concert 15	Concert 16
María Fernanda	"El tiempo de ti"	"Soy solo un secreto"	"Cinco minutos"	"Es ella más que yo"	"Yo por él"	"Él me mintió"	"Mala hierba"	"Tú"	"Lo siento"	"El incondicional"	"La voz de la experiencia"	"El hombre que yo amo"	"Ángel" (Belinda)	"Ángel" (Jon Secada) "Gimme More"	"Total Eclipse of the Heart" "La tortura"	"Sobreviviré" "Él me mintió"
Fabiola	"Las de la intuición"	"Volveré"	"Luz sin gravedad"	"Víveme"	"Daría"	"El amor coloca"	"Quién eres tú"	"Sé cómo duele"	"Lo siento"	"Tocando fondo"	"Cómo olvidar"	"El tiempo pasa"	"Cuando baja la marea"	"Yo pa ti no estoy" "Gimme More"	"Por cobardía" "Ven conmigo"	"Regresa a mí" (Toni Braxton) "Cómo olvidar"
Luis Armando	"Mi credo"	"Todo cambió"	"Por ella"	"Fuerte no soy"	"No soy el aire"	"Los hombres no deben llorar"	"Hazme olvidarla"	"Gavilán o paloma"	"La cosa más bella"	"Mis ojos lloran por ti"	"La planta"	"En mi viejo San Juan"	"Me enamoro de ti"	"El tordillo" "Lo que pasó pasó"	"Caminos de Michoacán" "La tortura"	"Al final" "Mis ojos lloran por ti"
Valeria	"El tiempo de ti"	"Hoy ya me voy" "Súbete a mi moto"	"Luz sin gravedad"	"Qué hago yo"	"Falsas esperanzas"	"Ese hombre"	"Sueños rotos"	"Si una vez"	"Pienso en ti"	"El incondicional"	"Detrás de mi ventana"	"Si queires verme llorar"	"De mí enamórate"	"Aún sin ti" "Love Today"	"Mentira" "Ven conmigo"	"Volverte a amar" "Ese hombre"
Perla	"Estos celos"	"El sol no regresa"	"Duele el amor"	"Vete por donde llegaste"	"Sin él"	"Inocente pobre amiga"	"Estés en donde estés"	"Tú de qué vas"	"La plaga"	"Lo haré por ti"	"La papa sin cátsup"	"Carcacha"	"Cielo rojo"	"Como tu mujer" "Love Today"	"Hey, güera" "Me nace del corazón"	"Lo siento, mi amor" "La papa sin cátsup"
Alex	"El tiempo de ti"	"A labio dulce"	"Me va a extrañar"	"Es ella más que yo"	"Me equivoqué"	"Ese hombre"	"Ya no quiero"	"Quítame ese hombre"	"Pienso en ti"	"Tocando fondo"	"Algo más"	"Desesperada"	"Así fue"	"Huele a peligro" "Lo que pasó pasó"	"Tarde" "Me nace del corazón"	"Regresa a mí" (Thalía) "Así fue"
Jackie	"Vuelvo a comenzar"	"De rodillas te pido" "Súbete a mi moto"	"Cinco minutos"	"Muriendo lento"	"Labios compartidos"	"Si no te hubieras ido"	"Qué ganas de no verte nunca más"	"A que no le cuentas"	"Me dediqué a perderte"	"Mis ojos lloran por ti"	"Malo"	"Secreto de amor"	"Otro día más sin verte"	"Lloran las rosas" "Gimme More"		
Matías	"Como un lobo"	"Dímelo"	"Buenos días, señor sol"	"Y te vas"	"Labios compartidos"	"De música ligera"	"Lloraré las penas"	"Mujeres"	"Vuelve"	"Dime ven"	"Mientes tan bien"	"La muralla"	"Lamento boliviano"			
Wilfredo	"Vuelvo a comenzar"	"El sol no regresa"	"Duele el amor"	"Amiga, por favor"	"Amargo adiós"	"Y llegaste tú"	"Por mujeres como tú"	"Bella"	"Por ti volaré"	"Mujeres divinas"	"Ahora te puedes marchar"	"Sueños"	"Otra vez"			
Esteban	"Estos celos"	"De rodillas te pido" "Súbete a mi moto"	"No te pido flores"	"Tamarindo"	"Por tu amor"	"Y te aprovechas"	"Como quien pierde una estrella"	"Entra en mi vida"	"Me dediqué a perderte"	"Mujeres divinas"	"Sabes a chocolate"	"El aventurero"				
Cintia	"Las de la intuición"	"Volveré"	"Te voy a perder"	"Ni una sola palabra"	"Devórame otra vez"	"Y llegaste tú"	"Besos de ceniza"	"Me equivoqué"	"Lluvia"	"Lo haré por ti"	"Cómo me haces falta"					
Iván	"Un montón de estrellas"	"Hoy ya me voy"	"Te voy a perder"	"Amiga, por favor"	"Si tú te atreves"	"Niña"	"La bomba"	"No me doy por vencido"	"Princesa tibetana"	"Dime ven"						
Fátima	"Las de la intuición"	"Dímelo"	"Cada que"	"Muriendo lento"	"Tatuajes"	"No me enseñaste"	"Besos de ceniza"	"Una noche de copas"	"Antología"							
Héctor	"Me enamora"	"A labio dulce"	"Cada que"	"Y te vas"	"Tatuajes"	"Bruja hada"	"Lloraré las penas"	"Chica de humo"								
Alba	"Un montón de estrellas"	"Todo cambió"	"Mi error, mi fantasía"	"Que nadie sepa mi sufrir"	"Por tu amor"	"Y te aprovechas"	"Estés en donde estés"									
Gerardo	"Vuelvo a comenzar"	"Soy solo un secreto" "Súbete a mi moto"	"Me va a extrañar"	"Te amo"	"Daría"	"Niña"										
Monserrat	"Un montón de estrellas"	"El presente"	"No te pido flores"	"Yo no te pido la luna"	"Devórame otra vez"											
Dasahev	"Mi credo"	"No podrás" "Súbete a mi moto"	"Buenos días, señor sol"	"Tamarindo"												
Alejandra	"Como un lobo"	"El presente"	"Buenos días, señor sol"													
José Roberto	"Estos celos"	"No podrás"														
Flor de María	"Como un lobo"															
Erick	"Como un lobo"															
Manuel	"Me enamora"															
Sergio	"Mi credo"															
Lyanne																

== Concerts ==
=== Concert 1 ===
- Aired on August 31, 2008
- The Final 24 performed the next songs:
  - "Vuelvo A Comenzar" (Timbiriche) - Gerardo, Jackie, Wilfredo
  - "Un Montón De Estrellas (Polo Montañez) - Alba, Ivan, Monserrat
  - "Estos Celos" (Vicente Fernández) - Esteban, Perla, José Roberto
  - "Las De La Intuición" (Shakira) - Fabiola, Cintia, Fátima
  - "Como Un Lobo" (Miguel Bosé) - Matias, Erik, Alejandra, Flor
  - "El Tiempo De Ti" (Playa Limbo) - Valeria, María Fernanda, Alex
  - "Me Enamora" (Juanes) - Hector, Manuel
  - "Mi Credo" (K-Paz de la Sierra) - Dasahev, Luis Armando, Sergio
- The 25 contestants that made it to the propaedeutic course sang in trios, except of Lyanne who was expelled before the concert.
- The 5 eliminated were: Lyanne, Flor de María, Erick, Manuel and Sergio.

=== Concert 2 ===
- Aired on September 7, 2008
- The 20 contestants will be performing for the first time in duets.

Nº	Song	Contestant	Verdict
1	"Volveré" (Jesse & Joy)	Fabiola	Safe
1	"Volveré" (Jesse & Joy)	Cinthia	Safe
2	"Dímelo" (Enrique Iglesias)	Matías	Safe
2	"Dímelo" (Enrique Iglesias)	Fátima	Safe
3	"El presente" (Julieta Venegas)	Monserrat	Safe
3	"El presente" (Julieta Venegas)	Alejandra	Safe
4	"Soy sólo un secreto" (Alejandra Guzmán)	María Fernanda	Safe
4	"Soy sólo un secreto" (Alejandra Guzmán)	Gerardo	Safe
5	"De rodillas te pido" (Alegres de la Sierra)	Jackie	Safe
5	"De rodillas te pido" (Alegres de la Sierra)	Estéban	Safe
6	"El Sol No Regresa" (Duranguense Version)	Perla	Safe
6	"El Sol No Regresa" (Duranguense Version)	Wilfredo	Safe
7	"No podrás" (Cristian Castro)	Dasahev	Safe
7	"No podrás" (Cristian Castro)	José Roberto	Voted Off
8	"Todo Cambió" (Camila)	Alba	Safe
8	"Todo Cambió" (Camila)	Luis Armando	Safe
9	"A labio dulce" (Iskander)	Alex	Safe
9	"A labio dulce" (Iskander)	Héctor	Safe
10	"Hoy ya me voy" (Kany García)	Iván	Safe
10	"Hoy ya me voy" (Kany García)	Valeria	Safe

- For their development in Concert 1; Jackie, Dasahev, Valeria, Estéban and Gerardo were selected to do another song besides the one they had in other to show themselves more to the audience.

Nº	Song	Contestant	Verdict
1	"Subete a mi moto" (Version 2008)	Jackie	Safe
1	"Subete a mi moto" (Version 2008)	Dasahev	Safe
1	"Subete a mi moto" (Version 2008)	Gerardo	Safe
1	"Subete a mi moto" (Version 2008)	Valeria	Safe
1	"Subete a mi moto" (Version 2008)	Estéban	Safe

- Eliminated: Jose Roberto

=== Concert 3 ===
- Aired on September 14, 2008
- Guests: Raul Sandoval & Nadia
- Sentenced: Luis Armando (by contestants) and Alejandra (by the judges)
- Eliminated: Alejandra

Nº	Song	Contestant	Verdict
1	"No te Pido Flores" (Fanny Lú)	Monserrat	Safe
1	"No te Pido Flores" (Fanny Lú)	Esteban	Safe
2	"Me Va a Extrañar" (Ricardo Montaner)	Alex	Safe
2	"Me Va a Extrañar" (Ricardo Montaner)	Gerardo	Safe
3	"Te Voy a Perder" (Alejandro Fernández)	Ivan	Safe
3	"Te Voy a Perder" (Alejandro Fernández)	Cintia	Safe
4	"Cada que" (Belanova)	Fatima	Safe
4	"Cada que" (Belanova)	Hector	Safe
5	"Buenos Dias Señor Sol" (Juan Gabriel)	Dasahev	Safe
5	"Buenos Dias Señor Sol" (Juan Gabriel)	Alejandra	Voted Off
5	"Buenos Dias Señor Sol" (Juan Gabriel)	Matias	Safe
6	"Cinco Minutos" (Gloria Trevi)	Maria Fernanda	Safe
6	"Cinco Minutos" (Gloria Trevi)	Jackie	Safe
7	"Por Ella"	Luis Armando	Bottom 2
8	"Mi Error, Mi Fantasia" (Edith Márquez)	Alba	Safe
9	"Duele el Amor" (Aleks Syntek y Ana Torroja)	Wilfredo	Safe
9	"Duele el Amor" (Aleks Syntek y Ana Torroja)	Perla	Safe
10	"Luz sin Gravedad" (Belinda)	Fabiola	Safe
10	"Luz sin Gravedad" (Belinda)	Valeria	Safe

=== Concert 4 ===
- Aired on September 21, 2008
- Guest: Victor Garcia
- Sentenced: Monserrat (by the contestants), Perla (by the teachers), Dasahev(by the judges)
- Eliminated: Dasahev

Nº	Song	Contestant	Verdict
1	"Tamarindo"	Esteban	Safe
1	"Tamarindo"	Dasahev	Voted Off
2	"Yo no te Pido la Luna" (Daniela Romo)	Monserrat	Bottom 3
3	"Ni Una Sola Palabra" (Paulina Rubio)	Cintia	Safe
4	"Vete por Donde Llegaste" (Lucero)	Perla	Bottom 3
5	"Amiga Por Favor" (Pedro Fernández)	Wilfredo	Safe
5	"Amiga Por Favor" (Pedro Fernández)	Ivan	Safe
6	"Te Amo" (Alexander Acha)	Gerardo	Safe
7	"Muriendo Lento" (Belinda y Moderatto)	Jackie	Safe
7	"Muriendo Lento" (Belinda y Moderatto)	Fatima	Safe
8	"Que Nadie Sepa mi Sufrir" (Margarita)	Alba	Safe
9	"Viveme" (Laura Pausini)	Fabiola	Safe
10	"Y te Vas" (Motel)	Hector	Safe
10	"Y te Vas" (Motel)	Matias	Safe
11	"Fuerte No Soy" (Intocable)	Luis Armando	Safe
12	"Qué Hago Yo" (Ha*Ash)	Valeria	Safe
13	"Es Ella mas que Yo" (Yuri)	Maria Fernanda	Safe
13	"Es Ella mas que Yo" (Yuri)	Alex	Safe

=== Concert 5 ===
- Aired on September 28, 2008
- The Final 17 performed the next songs:
  - "Me Equivoqué" (María José) - Alex
  - "Amargo Adiós" (Inspector) - Wilfredo
  - "No Soy El Aire" (Banda Guanatos) - Luis Armando
  - "Si Tú Te Atreves" (Luis Miguel) - Iván
  - "Yo Por él" (Yuridia) - Maria Fernanda
  - "Falsas Esperanzas" (Christina Aguilera) - Valeria
  - "Tatuajes" (Joan Sebastian) - Fátima, Hector
  - "Labios Compartidos" (Maná) - Jackie, Matias
  - "Daria" (La 5ta Estación) - Gerardo, Fabiola
  - "Sin él" (Marisela) - Perla
  - "Por Tu Amor" (Alacranes Musical) - Alba, Esteban
  - "Devórame Otra Vez" (Azúcar Moreno) - Cintia, Monserrat
- Guest: Carlos Rivera, winner of the 3rd generation performed "Que Nivel de Mujer" and "Te me Vas"
- Sentended: Monserrat (by the judges), Perla (by the contestants), Cintia (by the teachers)
- Eliminated: Monserrat

=== Concert 6 ===
- Aired on October 5, 2008
- The Final 16 performed the next songs individually or in duets:

Nº	Song	Contestant	Verdict
1	"Inocente Pobre Amiga" (Lupita D'Alessio)	Perla	Safe
2	"Los Hombres no Deben Llorar"	Luis Armando	Safe
3	"Ese hombre" (La India)	Alex	Safe
3	"Ese hombre" (La India)	Valeria	Safe
4	"Niña" (Reik)	Iván	Safe
4	"Niña" (Reik)	Gerardo	Eliminated
5	"Si no te hubieras ido" (Marco Antonio Solís)	Jackie	Safe
6	"No Me Enseñaste" (Thalía)	Fátima	Safe
7	"Bruja Hada" (David Cavazos)	Héctor	Sentenced by the judges, Safe
8	"El Amor Coloca" (Monica Naranjo)	Fabiola	Safe
9	"Y llegaste tu" (La Banda "El Recodo")	Wilfredo	Safe
9	"Y llegaste tu" (La Banda "El Recodo")	Cinthia	Safe
10	"De música ligera" (Soda Stereo)	Matías	Safe
11	"El me mintió" (Amanda Miguel)	María Fernanda	Safe
12	"Y te aprovechas" (Límite)	Alba	Safe
12	"Y te aprovechas" (Límite)	Estéban	Safe

- Guest: Samuel Castelán Marini
- Sentenced: Gerardo(by the teachers), Héctor (by the judges)
- Eliminated: Gerardo

=== Concert 7 ===
- Aired on October 12, 2008
- The Final 15 performed the next songs:
  - "Besos De Ceniza" (Timbiriche) - Fátima, Cintia
  - "Por Mujeres Como Tú" (Pepe Aguilar) - Wilfredo
  - "La Bomba" (Ricky Martin) - Iván
  - "Ya No Quiero" (Jesse & Joy) - Alex
  - "Como Quien Pierde Una Estrella" (Alejandro Fernández) - Esteban
  - "Lloraré las penas" (David Bisbal) - Hector, Matias
  - "Sueños Rotos" (La 5ta Estación) - Valeria
  - "Quién Eres Tú " (Yuri) - Fabiola
  - "Estés En Donde Estés " (Ha-Ash) - Alba, Perla
  - "Mala Hierba " (Alejandra Guzmán) - Maria Fernanda
  - "Hazme Olvidarla " (Alberto Vázquez) - Luis Armando
  - "Que Ganas De No Verte Nunca Más " (Valeria Lynch) - Jackie
- Guest: Estrella, Erika, Aranza
- Sentenced: Alba (by the teachers) and Luis Armando (by the judges)
- Eliminated: Alba

=== Concert 8 ===
- Aired on October 19, 2008
- The Final 14 performed the next songs:
  - "Tú" (Noelia) - Maria Fernanda
  - "Entra En Mi Vida" (Sin Bandera) - Esteban
  - "Si Una Vez" (Selena) - Valeria
  - "Sé Como Duele" (Karina) - Fabiola
  - "Una Noche De Copas" (María Conchita Alonso) - Fátima
  - "Bella" (Manuel Mijares) - Wilfredo
  - "Tu De Que Vas" (Grupo Imposter) - Perla
  - "Me Equivoqué" (Mariana Seoane) - Cintia
  - "No Me Doy Por Vencido" (Luis Fonsi) - Iván
  - "Gavilán O Paloma" (José José) - Luis Armando
  - "A Que No Le Cuentas" (Ednita Nazario) - Jackie
  - "Mujeres" (Ricardo Arjona) - Matias
  - "Chica De Humo" (Emmanuel) - Héctor
  - "Quítame Ese Hombre" (Pilar Montenegro) - Alex
- Guest: Yuridia
- Sentenced: Wilfredo (by the contestants), Luis Armando (by the teachers), Héctor (by the judges)
- Eliminated: Héctor

=== Concert 9 ===
- Aired on October 26, 2008
- The Final 13 performed the next songs:
  - "Me dediqué a perderte" (Alejandro Fernández) - Jackie and Esteban
  - "Pienso en ti" (Adriana Foster) - Valeria and Alex
  - "Lo siento" (Belinda) - Fabiola and Maria Fernanda
  - "Por ti volaré" (Andrea Bocelli) - Wilfredo
  - "La cosa más bella" (Eros Ramazzotti) - Luis Armando
  - "Princesa Tibetana" (Timbiriche) - Iván
  - "Antología" (Shakira) - Fátima
  - "La Plaga" (Alejandra Guzmán) - Perla
  - "Lluvia" (Luis Angel) - Cintia
  - "Vuelve" (Ricky Martin) - Matías
- Guests: Franco De Vita and Carlos Rivera performed "Si La Ves"
- Nominated: Fátima (nominated by the contestants), Perla (nominated by the teachers), Wilfredo (nominated by the judges)
- Eliminated: Fátima

=== Concert 10 ===
- Aired on November 2, 2008
- The Final 12 performed the next songs in pairs:
  - "Dime Ven" (Motel) - Ivan and Matias
  - "Lo haré por ti" (Paulina Rubio) - Perla and Cintia
  - "Tocando fondo" (Kalimba) - Fabiola and Alex
  - "Mujeres divinas" (Vicente Fernández) - Esteban and Wilfredo
  - "El Incondicional" (Edith Márquez) - Valeria and Maria Fernanda
  - "Mis Ojos Lloran Por ti" (Big Boy) - Jackie and Luis Armando
- Guest: Myriam, Yahir, Estrella, Raúl Sandoval, and the rest of the 1st Generation.
- Nominated: Wilfredo (Nominated by the contestants), Iván (Nominated by the teachers), Cintia (Nominated by the judges)
- Eliminated: Iván

=== Concert 11 ===
- Aired on November 9, 2008
- The Final 11 performed the next songs individually:
  - "Ahora te puedes marchar" (Luis Miguel) - Wilfredo
  - "Algo más" (La Quinta Estación) - Alex
  - "Mientes tan bien" (Sin Bandera) - Matías
  - "La papa sin catsup" (Gloria Trevi) - Perla
  - "Como me haces falta" (Ana Bárbara) - Cintia
  - "Sabes a chocolate" (Kumbia Kings) - Estéban
  - "La Voz de la Experiencia" (India) - Marifer
  - "Detrás de Mi Ventana" (Yuri) - Valeria
  - "Malo" (Bebe) - Jackie
  - "La Planta" (Caos) - Luis Armando
  - "Cómo Olvidar" (Olga Tañón) - Fabiola
- Guest: TBA
- Nominated: Fabiola (By the Contestants), Luis Armando (By the Teachers), Cintia (By the Judges)
- Eliminated: Cintia

=== Concert 12 ===
- Aired on November 16, 2008
- The Final 10 performed the next songs individually.
  - "Sueños" (Diego Torres) - Wilfredo
  - "Desesperada" (Marta Sánchez) - Alex
  - "La muralla" (Enanitos Verdes) - Matías
  - "Carcacha" (Selena) - Perla
  - "El Aventurero" (Pedro Fernández) - Estéban
  - "El Hombre que yo amo" (Myriam Hernández) - Marifer
  - "Si quieres verme llorar" (Lisa López) - Valeria
  - "Secreto de Amor" (Joan Sebastian) - Jackie
  - "En mi viejo San Juan" (Javier Solís) - Luis Armando
  - "El tiempo pasa" (Antonio Aguilar) - Fabiola
- Guest: None
- Nominated: Wilfredo (By the Former Contestants), Esteban (By the Teachers), Luis Armando (By the Judges)
- Eliminated: Esteban

=== Concert 13 ===
- Aired on November 23, 2008
- The Final 9 performed the next songs individually:
  - "Otra Vez" (Victor García) - Wilfredo
  - "Así fue" (Juan Gabriel) - Alex
  - "Lamento Boliviano" (Enanitos Verdes) - Matías
  - "Cielo Rojo" (Lola Beltrán) - Perla
  - "Cuando baja la marea" (Yuri) - Fabiola
  - "De mí enamorate" (Daniela Romo) - Valeria
  - "Otro día más sin verte" (Jon Secada) - Jackie
  - "Me enamoro de ti" (Uff!) - Luis Armando
  - "Angel" (Belinda) - Maria Fernanda
- Guest: None
- This concert there was a surprise as Rafa Araneda announced that not only one but two contestants were going to be eliminated.
- In the first elimination the contestants sang in duels to start determinating the nominees for the first elimination:
  - Fabiola vs Wilfredo - Nominated from the duel: Wilfredo
  - Jackie vs Perla - Nominated from the duel: Perla
  - Matias vs Luis Armando - Nominated from the duel: Both Matias and Luis Armando
  - Alex vs Valeria vs Maria Fernanda - Nominated from the duel: Alex
  - Then the judges and the teachers decided which two losers from the duels would go to face the public vote.
- Nominated by the teachers and the judges to face the public vote: Wilfredo and Perla
- First Eliminated: Wilfredo
- After the elimination of Wilfredo, Rafa Araneda announced the public's vote positions

Public's votes places after Wilfredo's elimination:

1. 1st place: Perla
2. 2nd place: Fabiola
3. 3rd place: Valeria
4. 4th place: Maria Fernanda
5. 5th place: Luis Armando
6. 6th place: Matías
7. 7th place: Jackie
8. 8th place: Alex

- Second elimination first part of Special challenge: Alex, Perla, Matias and Luis Armando had a free dance challenge, and the teachers saved Perla
- Second elimination second part of Special challenge: Alex, Matias and Luis Armando will have to do ballroom dance. Matias lost the challenge and was nominated by the teachers.
- Second elimination nominees:
  - Maria Fernanda (By the judges), Matías (By the Teachers) and Jackie (By the Contestants)

After the nomination from the contestants, it was revealed a new list of positions by public vote:

1. 1st place: Fabiola
2. 2nd place: Perla
3. 3rd place: Valeria
4. 4th place: Luis Armando
5. 5th place: Alex
6. 6th place: Matias
7. 7th place: Jackie
8. 8th place: Maria Fernanda

- Second Eliminated: Matias
- After the elimination of Matias, Luis Armando remains as the last male standing in the Final 7 with 6 girls and him.

=== Concert 14 ===
- Aired on November 30, 2008
- The Final 7 performed the next songs individually:
  - "Huele a peligro" (Banda Limón) - Alex
  - "Como tu mujer" (Rocío Dúrcal) - Perla
  - "Yo pa ti no estoy" (Rossana) - Fabiola
  - "Aún sin ti" (Los hijos de Sánchez) - Valeria
  - "Lloran las rosas" (Cristian Castro) - Jackie
  - "El tordillo" (Vicente Fernández) - Luis Armando
  - "Angel" (Jon Secada) - Maria Fernanda
- Besides the individual songs, there will be 2 duets and 1 trio:
  - "Gimme More" (Britney Spears) - Fabiola, Maria Fernanda and Jackie
  - "Lo que paso paso" (Daddy Yankee) - Luis Armando and Alex
  - "Love Today" (Mika) - Perla and Valeria
- Guest: None
- Valeria and Maria Fernanda had a challenge to decide the First Finalist for the Grand Finale, the teachers and the judges decided that Valeria had to be the First Finalist.
- Positions by Public Vote after Judges' nomination:

1. Maria Fernanda
2. Valeria
3. Perla
4. Luis Armando
5. Fabiola
6. Jackie
7. Alex

- After a Special Dance Challenge, the teachers nominated Alex.
- After the Contestants' Nomination, where the Contestants nominated Jackie with 5 votes, it was shown the new Positions by Public Vote:

1. Valeria
2. Maria Fernanda
3. Luis Armando
4. Fabiola
5. Perla
6. Jackie
7. Alex

- Nominated: Perla (By the Judges), Alex (By the teachers), and Jackie(By the contestants)
- Perla was saved first by a huge difference of votes ahead of the other two nominees.
- Eliminated: Jackie

=== Concert 15 ===
- Aired on December 7, 2008
- The Final 6 will perform the next songs individually:
  - "Tarde" (Rocio Dúrcal) - Alex
  - "Hey güera" (Alejandra Guzmán) - Perla
  - "Por cobardía" (Lila Deneken) - Fabiola
  - "Mentira" (Hernaldo Zúñiga) - Valeria
  - "Caminos de Michoacán" (Vicente Fernández) - Luis Armando
  - "Total Eclipse of the Heart" (Taylor Dayne) - Maria Fernanda
- Besides the individual songs, there will be 3 duets:
  - "Me nace del corazón" (Juan Gabriel) - Alex and Perla
  - "La tortura" (Shakira and Alejandro Sanz) - Luis Armando and Maria Fernanda
  - "Ven conmigo" (Christina Aguilera) - Fabiola and Valeria
- Guest: None
- Fabiola and Maria Fernanda had a challenge to decide the Second Finalist for the Grand Finale, the teachers and the judges decided that Maria Fernanda had to be the Second Finalist Along With Valeria
- Positions by Public Vote after The Contestant nomination:

1. Maria Fernanda
2. Fabiola
3. Luis Armando
4. Alex
5. Perla
6. Valeria

- Nominees: Perla (by the judges), Luis Armando (by the teachers) and Alex (by the contestants)
- Eliminated: Alex(Eliminated at the Finals)
- Finalists (Final 5):
  - 1st Valeria
  - 2nd Maria Fernanda
  - 3rd Fabiola
  - 4th Luis Armando
  - 5th Perla

=== Concert 16 (Grand Finale) ===
- Aired on December 14, 2008 on Tuxtla Gutierrez, Chiapas.
- The Final 6 will perform the next songs individually:
  - "Regresa A Mí" (Thalía) - Alex
  - "Lo Siento Mi Amor" (Lupita D'Alessio) - Perla
  - "Regresa A Mi" (Toni Braxton) - Fabiola
  - ""Volverte A Amar" (Alejandra Guzmán) Valeria
  - "Al Final" (Emmanuel) - Luis Armando
  - "Sobreviviré" (Mónica Naranjo) - Maria Fernanda
- Besides, they will also sing their best song of the season:
  - "Asi Fue" (Juan Gabriel) - Alex
  - " La Papa Sin Catsup" (Gloria Trevi) - Perla
  - "Como Olvidar" (Olga Tañón) - Fabiola
  - "Ese Hombre" (La India) - Valeria
  - "Mis Ojos Lloran Por Ti" (Big Boy) - Luis Armando
  - "Él Me Mintió" (Amanda Miguel) - Maria Fernanda
- Positions by Public Vote announced after the dance challenge:
  - 1st place: Luis Armando
  - 2nd place: Maria Fernanda
  - 3rd place: Fabiola
  - 4th place: Perla
  - 5th place: Valeria
- Nominations for winning: Maria Fernanda (By the Teachers), Valeria (By the Contestants) and TBA (By the Judges)
- Positions by Public Vote announced after the Contestants' nomination for the winner:
  - 1st place: Fabiola
  - 2nd place: Luis Armando
  - 3rd place: Maria Fernanda
  - 4th place: Valeria
  - 5th place: Perla
- Final positions:
  - 1st Place: Maria Fernanda
  - 2nd Place: Fabiola Rodas
  - 3rd Place: Luis Armando
  - 4th Place: Valeria
  - 5th Place: Perla
  - 6th Place: Alex
  - Winner: Maria Fernanda

== Professors and staff ==
- Headmaster: Héctor Martínez
- Singing: Lula Ross, Willy Gutierrez
- Choreography: Guillermina Gómez
- Body Expression: Charly D
- Theatre: Carmen Delgado
- Voice Mounting: Beto Castillo and Raúl Carballeda
- Psychologist: Lizi Rodriguez
- Host: Rafael Araneda (from Rojo Fama Contrafama in Chile)
- Judges: Enrique Guzmán, Raúl Quintanilla, Lisset and Arturo López Gavito
