= José Manuel Figueroa =

Mexican singer-songwriter

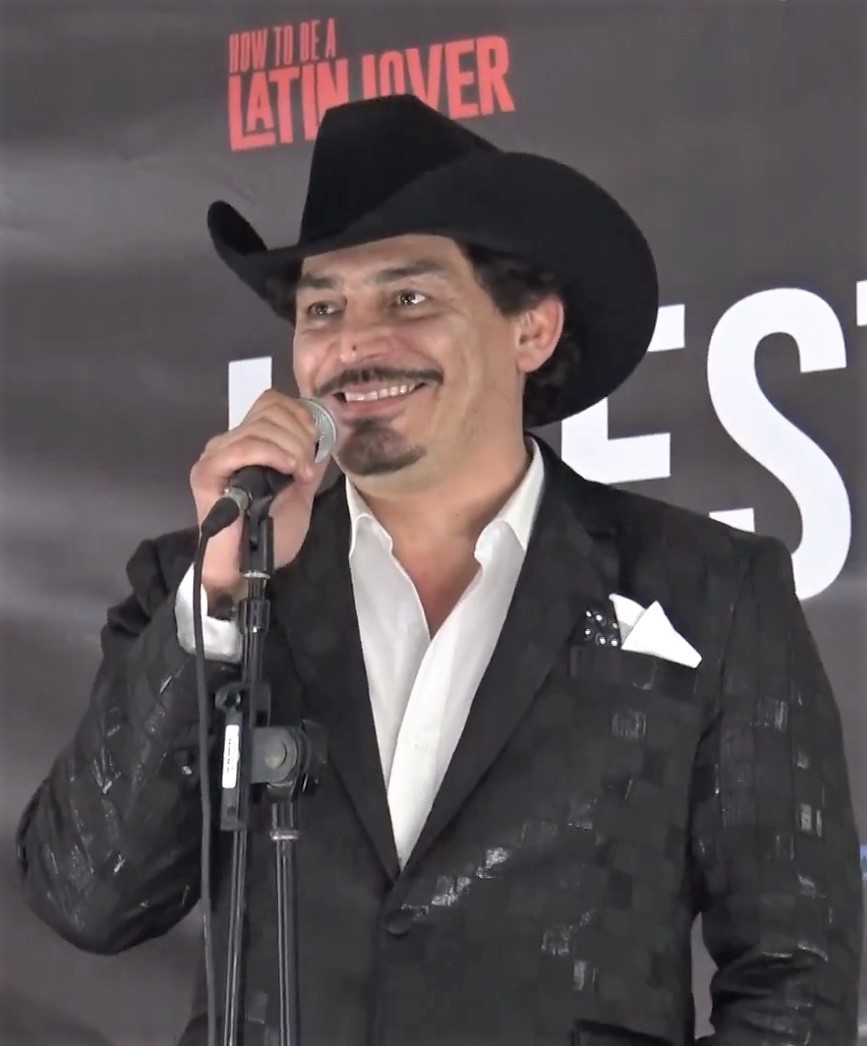
- Figueroa speaks in 2017
- Born: José Manuel Figueroa Jr. May 15, 1975 (age 51); Chicago, Illinois, United States
- Occupations: Singer, songwriter, actor
- Years active: 1995–present
- Website: www.josemanuelfigueroa.com

José Manuel Figueroa Jr. (born May 15, 1975) is a Mexican singer, songwriter, and actor who specializes in Regional Mexican music. He is the eldest of eight children and last living son of singer-songwriter Joan Sebastian.

== Personal life ==
José Manuel Figueroa was born on May 15, 1975, in Chicago, Illinois, United States, to Mexican singer Joan Sebastian and Teresa Figueroa-González. He is the eldest child of that relationship. His late brothers were Juan Sebastian Figueroa(†) and Trigo de Jesus Figueroa(†). His father died in July 2015. His half-brother and fellow singer-songwriter Julián Figueroa died in 2023.

== Discography ==
- Expulsado del Paraiso (1995)
- Jose Manuel Figueroa (1998)
- Mala Hierba (1999)
- A Caballo (2002)
- Inmortal (2004)
- Rosas y Espinas (2013)
- No Estás Tú (2017)
- Paso a Pasito (2022)

== Series ==
In 2016, he portrayed his father Joan Sebastian in the miniseries Por Siempre Joan Sebastian.
