= Por siempre Joan Sebastian =

- Genre: Miniseries; Biographical
- Starring: José Manuel Figueroa
- Country of origin: Mexico
- Original language: Spanish
- No. of episodes: 18

Production
- Executive producer: Carla Estrada
- Running time: 42-45 minutes
- Production company: Televisa

Original release
- Network: Canal de las Estrellas
- Release: 1 August – 21 August 2016

Por Siempre Joan Sebastian (English title: Forever Joan Sebastian) is a biographical miniseries about the late Mexican singer Joan Sebastian, who is portrayed by his two sons; José Manuel Figueroa (as an adult) and Julián Figueroa (as a younger man and teenager). The miniseries is produced by Carla Estrada and co stars Arcelia Ramírez, Juan Pablo Gil, Irán Castillo, Miguel Angel Biaggio, and Livia Brito.

== Broadcast ==
The series broadcast on June 27, 2016 on Univision at 10pm, taking the former timeslot of Yago. The first episode received high ratings, surpassing El Señor de los Cielos. It concluded on July 25, 2016. The miniseries then premiered in Mexico on August 1, 2016 on Canal de las Estrellas, replacing El hotel de los secretos, and ended on August 21, 2016.

== Plot ==
This 18 part miniseries tells the story of Mexican singer Joan Sebastian from his childhood in Juliantla, Guerrero in Mexico up until his death in July 2015.

== Cast ==
- José Manuel Figueroa as Joan Sebastian † (1978-2015)
- Julián Figueroa as Joan Sebastian (1968-mid-1970s) / Himself (episodes 17-18)
- Arcelia Ramírez as Leticia Gonzalez (based on Teresa De Jesús González) (1978-2010s)
- Livia Brito as Maricruz Guardia (based on Maribel Guardia)
- Ernesto D'Alessio as José Miguel Figueroa (based on José Manuel Figueroa)
- Miguel Ángel Biaggio as Enrico Figueroa (based on Federico Figueroa Figueroa)
- Irán Castillo as Celina Esparza (based on Alina Espín)
- Juan Pablo Gil as Rodrigo Figueroa Gonzalez (based on Trigo de Jesús Figueroa González †)
- Alejandra Ambrosi as Maica Jimenez (based on Érica Alonso)
- Lumi Cavazos as Celia Figueroa †
- Diego de Erice as Adrián Figueroa Gonzalez (based on Juan Sebastián Figueroa González † )
- Jessica Decote as Ivette Moran (based on Arleth Terán)
- Martin Altomaro as Dionisio Figueroa (based on Juan Marcos Figueroa Figueroa)
- Raquel Garza as Maica's (Erika's) mother
- Carlos Camara Jr. as Nacho Tappan (based on Alfredo Tappan) director of the telenovela Tu y Yo
- Ricardo Kleinbaum as Emir Rojas (based on Emilio Larrosa), producer of the telenovela Tu y Yo
- Abril Rivera as Leticia González (Teresa De Jesus González) (1973-1977)
- Alejandra Robles Gil as Andrea Figueroa (based on Zarelea Figueroa Ocampo)
- Ximena Martinez as Marcela Figueroa Esparza (based on Marcelia Figueroa Espín)
- Viviana Serna as Nora "La Palomita" (based on María de Jesús Malacara "La Chuy")
- Adalberto Parra as Mario Figueroa (based on Marcos Figueroa † )
- Zaide Silvia Gutiérrez as Amanda Figueroa (based on Yolanda Figueroa Figueroa)
- Palmeria Cruz as Mary Lupe (based on María Del Carmen Ocampo)
- Azela Robinson as Marissa (based on Alicia Juarez)

== Episodes ==
| No. | Title | Original release date | Mexican Air date | US viewers (millions) |
|---|---|---|---|---|
| 1 | "Seminarista sin vocación" | June 27, 2016 | August 1, 2016 | 2.1 |
In 1964, the father of José Manuel Figueroa enrolls him in a boarding school so he can have an education and four years later he decides to be a seminarian to sing in the church choir. But Jose Manuel begins a relationship with a girl named Flor and after losing his virginity to her, he realizes he can never be a priest. He is heartbroken when Flor moves away ending their relationship. Jose Manuel returns to Juliantla, where he tells his dad he wants to be a singer.
| 2 | "Encuentro con Angélica María y con lo que cuesta un disco" | June 28, 2016 | August 2, 2016 | 2.2 |
In 1971, José Manuel gets a job in a hotel and there he meets singer Angélica María. She recommends him with a representative and he records his first album in 1973, but it has little success. In 1974, Jose Manuel gets a job working in a record store. While recording one night, he meets Lety, who becomes his girlfriend but her parents soon oppose their relationship when they plan to get married and try to keep them apart. Jose Manuel gives Lety an ultimatum during a phone call to decide between her parents or him.
| 3 | "La boda de José Manuel" | June 29, 2016 | August 3, 2016 | 2.1 |
Lety comes to Mexico and she marries José Manuel in 1975 and they form a family. By the late 1970s José Manuel begins to use Joan Sebastian as his stage name. Meanwhile, Lety discovers his infidelities with a singer named Marisa.
| 4 | "¡Joan conoce a Maricruz!" | June 30, 2016 | August 4, 2016 | 1.9 |
Joan Sebastian becomes famous in the 1980s, and sings his song "25 Rosas" on Siempre en Domingo. In 1990, Joan becomes interested in recording a song with Maricruz Guardia. He searches for her and makes an appointment with her at Televisa.
| 5 | "Maricruz, un nuevo amor" | July 1, 2016 | August 5, 2016 | 1.8 |
Maricruz does not accept having a relationship with Joan, but he does not give up and eventually Joan wins Maricruz's heart and in 1992 Joan divorces Lety and marries Maricruz. In 1995, Maricruz gives birth to Julian, the son of Joan, who becomes jealous by Maricruz's work as an actress. Fed up with Joan's jealousy, Maricruz kicks Joan out of the house but he breaks down the door to get inside.
| 6 | "Un accidente y traición" | July 5, 2016 | August 8, 2016 | 1.7 |
Joan, saddened that Maricruz kicked him out, has an automobile accident and thanks to that, Maricruz and him reconcile. Maricruz and Joan star in a telenovela called Tu y yo, but during production Joan cheats on Maricruz with Ivette Moran who stars as the antagonist of the telenovela. Maricruz finds out about the affair and then packs Joan's things telling him to go for good.
| 7 | "El fin de una relación" | July 6, 2016 | August 9, 2016 | 2.0 |
Maricruz decides to end her marriage to Joan Sebastian, and after wrapping up shooting for the final episode of Tu y yo, Joan and Maricruz divorce agreeing to share custody of their son Julian. In 2000, Joan meets Mayka Jimenez while being backstage after a concert and they fall in love.
| 8 | "Fallece la mamá de Joan Sebastian" | July 7, 2016 | August 10, 2016 | 1.8 |
Joan reproaches his father, Mario, for being an alcoholic and not caring for Joan's mother, Celia. Joan can not go to Mayka's birthday and sends her a gift, which is a car. Celia passes away.
| 9 | "Entre Mayka y Celina" | July 8, 2016 | August 11, 2016 | 1.6 |
Joan tells Celina that he could love her for the rest of his life. Mayka is pregnant. Mario, Joan's father, gets drunk, has an accident with a horse and dies.
| 10 | "Entre la felicidad y el dolor" | July 11, 2016 | August 12, 2016 | 1.9 |
Celina had her baby and Joan is going to see her at the hospital; unfortunately the doctor informs them that their daughter has died.
| 11 | "Cáncer de huesos" | July 12, 2016 | August 14, 2016 | 1.8 |
Joan finds out he has bone cancer, but decides to not undergo chemotherapy.
| 12 | "Una difícil decisión para los hijos de Joan" | July 13, 2016 | August 15, 2016 | 1.7 |
In a presentation, Joan loses consciousness and falls off the horse, and falls into a coma. José Miguel, his eldest son, authorizes chemotherapy.
| 13 | "El regreso del Huracán del Sur" | July 15, 2016 | August 16, 2016 | 1.5 |
Joan's fans put an altar for him outside the hospital. Joan wakes up from the coma and gets angry when he learns that he was given chemo.
| 14 | "El asesinato de Rodrigo" | July 18, 2016 | August 17, 2016 | 1.7 |
Joan Sebastian receives word that he is nominated for the Latin Grammy Awards. However, happiness lasts little when his son Rodrigo is killed in one of Joan's shows.
| 15 | "El cáncer regresa y matan a Adrián" | July 19, 2016 | August 18, 2016 | 1.6 |
The doctor tells José Miguel and Celina that Joan has cancer again and it is necessary to start chemotherapy. Joan's son, Adrian, is shot in the entrance of a night club.
| 16 | "Investigación por ¿nexos con el narco?" | July 20, 2016 | August 19, 2016 | 1.8 |
The assassin of Adrián is shot by one of the cartels of Mexico. This situation causes the police to investigate Joan to see if he has any links with drug trafficking.
| 17 | "Medidas desesperadas" | July 22, 2016 | August 21, 2016 | 1.5 |
Joan's doctor tells him that it is necessary to induce him into a coma to carry out the chemotherapy. Joan asks José Miguel and Enrico to cancel all the concerts that are scheduled for their tour.
| 18 | "Tocando el cielo" | July 25, 2016 | August 21, 2016 | 2.0 |
Joan is in very poor health and asks José Miguel to set up a recording studio on the ranch, because he wants to record an album before he dies. Although he was prohibited from getting up, he attends the fifteen years of his daughter Marcela.
