= Juliantla =

- Town
- Motto: "Grande y fuerte"
- Location in Mexico
- Coordinates: 18°19′N 99°52′W
- Country: Mexico
- State: Guerrero
- Municipality: Taxco de Alarcón

Population (2010)
  - Total: 946

Juliantla is a town of Taxco de Alarcón Municipality, in the state of Guerrero, south-western Mexico, made famous by native star Joan Sebastian who made a 70's Spanish pop rock song after his hometown.

The ruins of a 16th century mikveh was discovered in Juliantla.
