= Secreto de Amor (album) =

Studio album by Joan Sebastian
- Released: 25 April 2000
- Genre: Latin pop, country
- Label: Musart
- Producer: Joan Sebastian

Joan Sebastian chronology
Nostalgia y Recuerdos (2000)	Secreto de Amor (2000)	En Vivo: Desde la Plaza El Progreso en Guadalajara (2001)

Secreto de Amor is a studio album by Joan Sebastian. Released in 2000 on the Musart label, it was Sebastian's 27th studio album. It won a Lo Nuestro Award for Regional Mexican Album of the Year in 2001. The title track also served as the theme song for the 2001 telenovela of the same name. In 2015, it was selected by Billboard magazine as one of the "50 Essential Latin Albums of the Last 50 Years".

== Track listing ==
1. "Secreto de Amor" [4:35]
2. "Amorcito Mio" [2:59]
3. "Con Besos" [2:47]
4. "Un Idiota" [3:22]
5. "Rima" [3:14]
6. "El Toro" [3:17]
7. "Me Gustas" [3:29]
8. "Anoche Hablamos" [3:32]
9. "Un Vaquero en la Ciudad" [3:27]
10. "Julián" [3:25]

All songs on the album were written and composed by Joan Sebastian.

== Charts ==
Chart (2000)	Peak position
US Top Latin Albums (Billboard)	5
US Regional Mexican Albums (Billboard)	1
US Independent Albums (Billboard)	18
US Heatseekers Albums (Billboard)	28

== Sales and certifications ==
Region	Certification	Certified units/sales
United States (RIAA)	4× Platinum (Latin)	400,000^{^}
^{^} Shipments figures based on certification alone.
