= Más Allá del Sol =

Studio album by Joan Sebastian
- Released: April 24, 2006
- Genre: Banda
- Length: 35:34
- Label: Musart
- Producer: Joan Sebastian; Chucho Rincón

Joan Sebastian chronology
De Relajo y Pa Bailar (2006)	Más Allá del Sol (2006)	No Es de Madera (2007)

Más Allá del Sol (Beyond the Sun) is the 35th studio album by Mexican singer-songwriter Joan Sebastian. Produced by Sebastian, it was released on April 24, 2006 through Musart Records. The album peaked at No. 7 on the Billboard Top Latin Albums chart, and peaked at No. 189 on the Billboard 200, becoming Sebastian's third entry on the chart.

The album spawned the top-ten singles "Eso y Más" and the title track "Mas Allá del Sol", which peaked at No. 6 and No. 3 on the Billboard Hot Latin Songs chart, respectively. The title track is Sebastian's longest-running entry on the chart, staying on it for 35 weeks.

== Track listing ==
All tracks are written by Joan Sebastian

No.	Title	Length
1.	"Reflexiones de Este Gallo"	2:48
2.	"Cuando Murió Mi Caballo"	3:03
3.	"Amor Limosnero"	3:40
4.	"Sol"	2:42
5.	"Invítame Un Cigarro"	2:42
6.	"Viviré Lo Mío"	3:02
7.	"Guerita de Huentitán"	2:52
8.	"La Medecina"	2:40
9.	"Más Allá del Sol"	2:43
10.	"Guerrero Es"	3:22
11.	"En La Banca"	3:15
12.	"Eso y Más"	2:39
Total length:		35:34

== Charts ==
Chart performance for "Más Allá del Sol"
Chart (2006)	Peak position
US Billboard 200	189
US Top Latin Albums (Billboard)	7
US Regional Mexican Albums (Billboard)	2
US Independent Albums (Billboard)	13
US Heatseekers Albums (Billboard)	8
