= Taxco de Alarcón (municipality) =

Municipality in the Mexican state of Guerrero

- Municipality
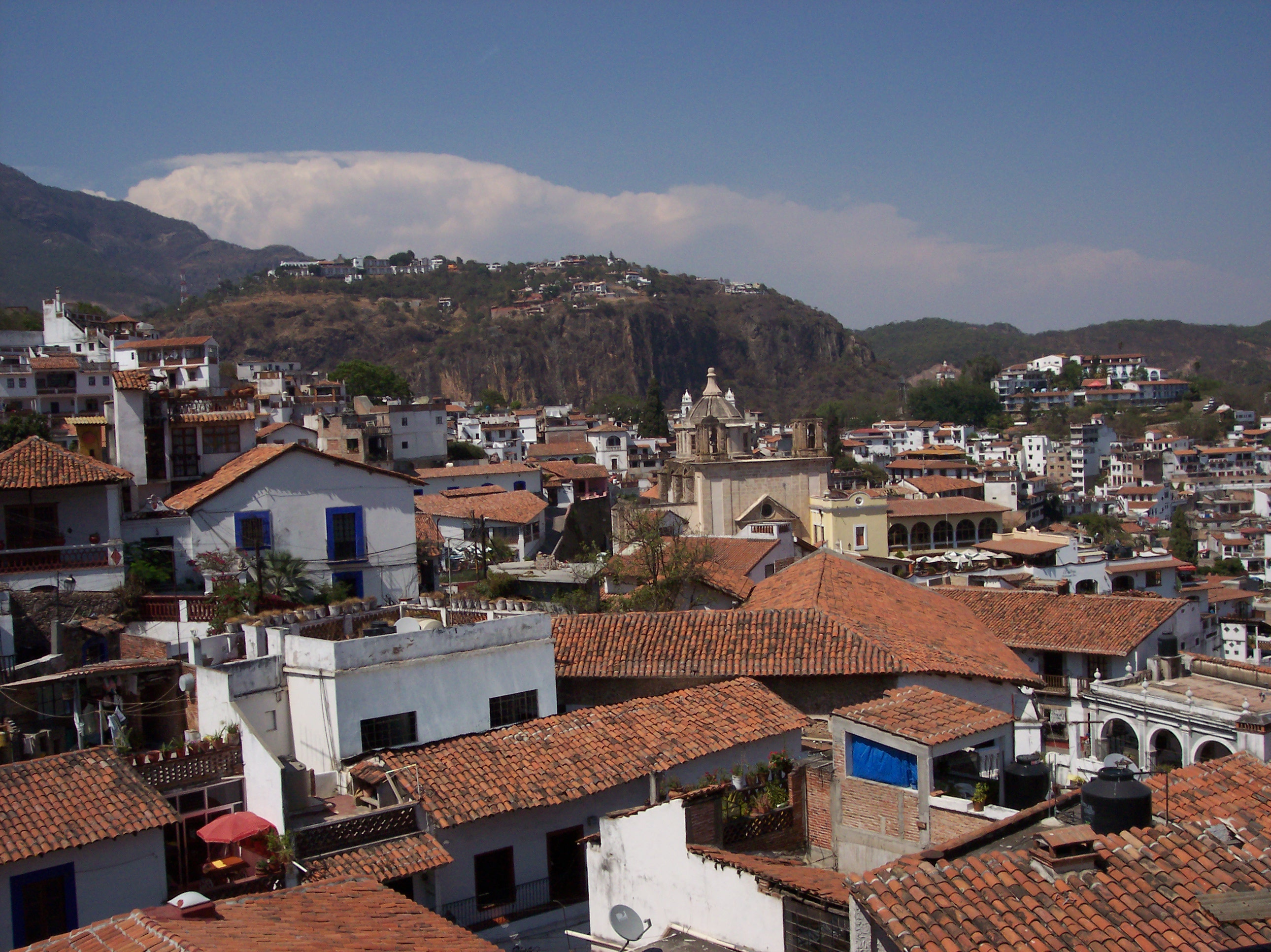
- The capital city, Taxco de Alarcón

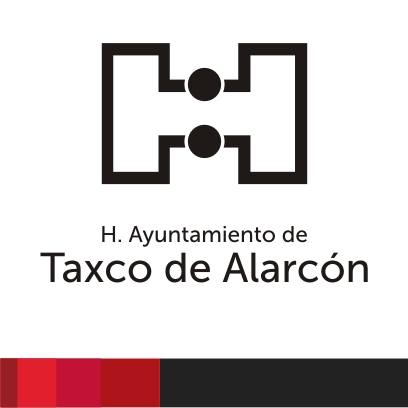
- Coat of arms

- Location in Mexico
- Coordinates: 18°23′N 99°29′W
- Country: Mexico
- State: Guerrero
- Municipal seat: Taxco de Alarcón

Area
  - Total: 650.7 km^{2} (251.2 sq mi)

Population (2020)
  - Total: 105,586

Taxco de Alarcón is a municipality in the Mexican state of Guerrero. It covers an area of 650.7 km^{2} and includes 121 communities. The municipal seat lies at Taxco de Alarcón. The population was 105,586 at the time of the 2020 census.

Less than 3% of the population of the municipality is of pure indigenous ethnicity according to the Census. The two indigenous languages spoken here are Nahuatl and Zapotec. It borders with the municipalities of Tetipac, Iguala, Teloloapan, Buena Vista de Cuellar, Pedro Ascencio Alquisiras and Ixcateopan as well at the state of Morelos.

== Geography ==
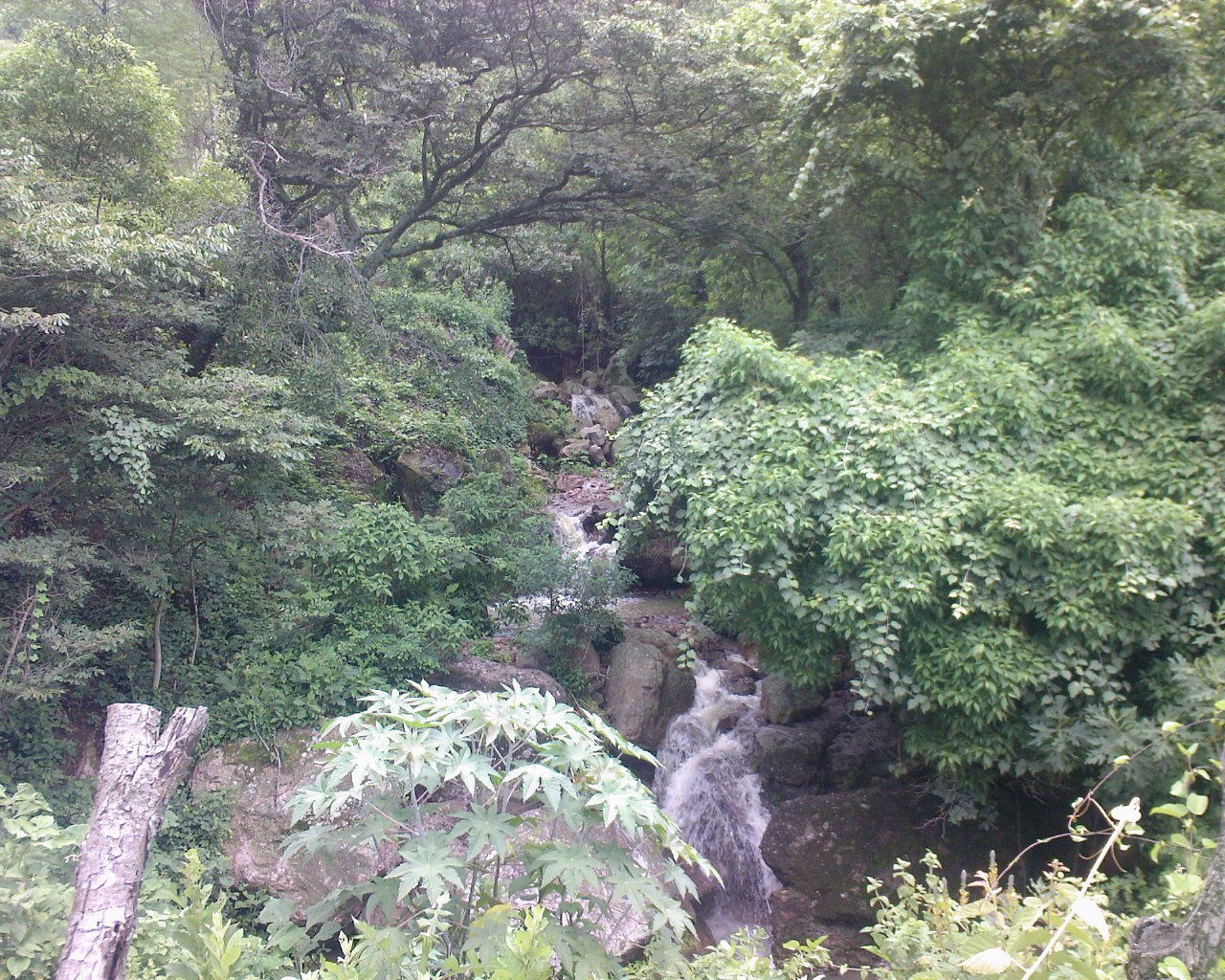
Area is filled with streams due latitude and altitude

The terrain has an average altitude of 1,752 meters, which ranges from 1,000 meters to 2,300 meters. Seventy five percent of its territory consists of rugged mountains, twenty percent is semi-flat and only five percent is flat. The flatter lands are in the lower elevations. The major rivers here are the Taxco and the Temixco, with a number of arroyos that feed into them during the rainy season. There is a lake that is filled only part of the year and a small dam called San Marcos.

The climate in Taxco ranges from hot and relatively moist in the flatlands to warm and relatively moist in the higher mountainous areas. Average temperatures for the year range between 18 and 20 C. Most of the municipality is covered in semi-tropical foliage which has a tendency to drop leaves during the dry season from October to May. In the highest elevations, pine and oak forests can be found.

== Economy ==
Most of the municipality's natural resources lie underground in the form of gold, silver, lead, copper, and zinc deposits. Above ground a number of species of timber trees exist as well as areas for agriculture and livestock. Principle crops grown in the municipality are corn, peanuts, luffa sponges, beans and tomatillos. Livestock consists of pigs, goats, horses and some fowl. Most of the industry here revolves around mining precious metals as well as the manufacture of drywall and masonry materials.

== Demography ==
| Settlement | Population |
| Taxco de Alarcón | 50,399 |
| Tlamacazapa | 6,820 |
| Acamixtla | 5,301 |
| Acuitlapán | 4,376 |
| Taxco El Viejo | 3,172 |
| Juliantla | 694 |
| Total Municipality | 105,586 |

== Government ==
=== Municipal presidents ===
| Municipal president | Term | Political party | Notes |
|---|---|---|---|
| Felipe Valle | 1950–1952 | | |
| Enrique Caballero Aburto | 1952–1955 | PRI | |
| Manuel Castrejón Gómez | 1956 | | Acting municipal president |
| Élfego Pineda Álvarez | 1956 | | Acting municipal president |
| Servando Ríos Mendoza | 1957–1959 | | |
| Francisco Pineda Flores | 1960–1962 | | |
| Luis Téllez Bustamante | 1963–1965 | | |
| Horacio Rangel Ezequiel | 1965 | | |
| Jaime Castrejón Díez | 1966–1968 | | |
| José García Chávez | 1969–1971 | | |
| Alfredo Figueroa Baena | 1972–1974 | | |
| José Antonio Ortega Figueroa | 1975–1977 | | |
| Gustavo Martínez Martínez | 1978–1980 | | |
| Ricardo Figueroa Rodríguez | 1981–1983 | | |
| José Fernando Benítez López | 1984–1986 | | |
| Manuel Saidi González | 1987–1989 | | |
| Enrique Martini Castillo | 1990–1993 | | |
| Mario Hipólito Flores Pérez | 1993–1996 | | |
| Marcos Efrén Parra Gómez | 1996–1999 | | |
| Isaac Ocampo Fernández | 1999–2002 | | |
| Abraham Ponce Guadarrama | 2002–2004 | | |
| Fernando Gutiérrez | 2004–2005 | | |
| Ramiro Jaimes Gómez | 2005–2007 | | |
| Ma. de los Ángeles Lagunas Vera | 2007–2008 | | |
| Álvaro Burgos Barrera | 2008–2011 | | |
| Marco Antonio Sierra Martínez | 2011–2012 | | |
| Salomón Majul González | 2012–2015 | | |
| Omar Jalil Flores Majul | 2015–2018 | PRI; PVEM | |
| Marcos Efrén Parra Gómez | 2018–2021 | PAN; PRD; MC | Coalition "For Taxco to the Front" |
| Mario Figueroa Mundo | 2021–2024 | Force for Mexico | |
| Juan Andrés Vega Carranza | 2024– | PVEM; PT; Morena | Coalition "Sigamos Haciendo Historia" (Let's Keep Making History) |
