= Afortunado =

Studio album by Joan Sebastian
- Released: 17 December 2002
- Genre: Banda
- Label: Musart
- Producer: Joan Sebastian

Joan Sebastian chronology
Lo Dijo el Corazón (2002)	Afortunado (2002)	Que Amarren a Cupido (2004)

Afortunado (Lucky) is an album by Joan Sebastian, released in December 2002 through the record label Musart. In 2004, the album earned Sebastian a Grammy Award for Best Mexican/Mexican-American Album.

== Track listing ==
All songs written by Sebastian.

1. "Don Marcos" – 2:53
2. "Adios Cariño" – 4:05
3. "Del 8 de Abril" – 2:32
4. "El Polvo de Tus Pasos" – 2:55
5. "El General" – 2:38
6. "Y No Hagas Caso" – 3:03
7. "Seria Una Lastima" – 3:18
8. "Sentimental" – 2:49
9. "Asi Te Quiero" – 3:20
10. "Hoy Por Hoy" – 2:48
11. "Desamor" – 3:10
12. "Afortunado" – 3:15

== Charts ==
Chart (2003)	Peak position
US Top Latin Albums (Billboard)	14
US Regional Mexican Albums (Billboard)	7
US Independent Albums (Billboard)	19
US Heatseekers Albums (Billboard)	35
