= El Dasa =

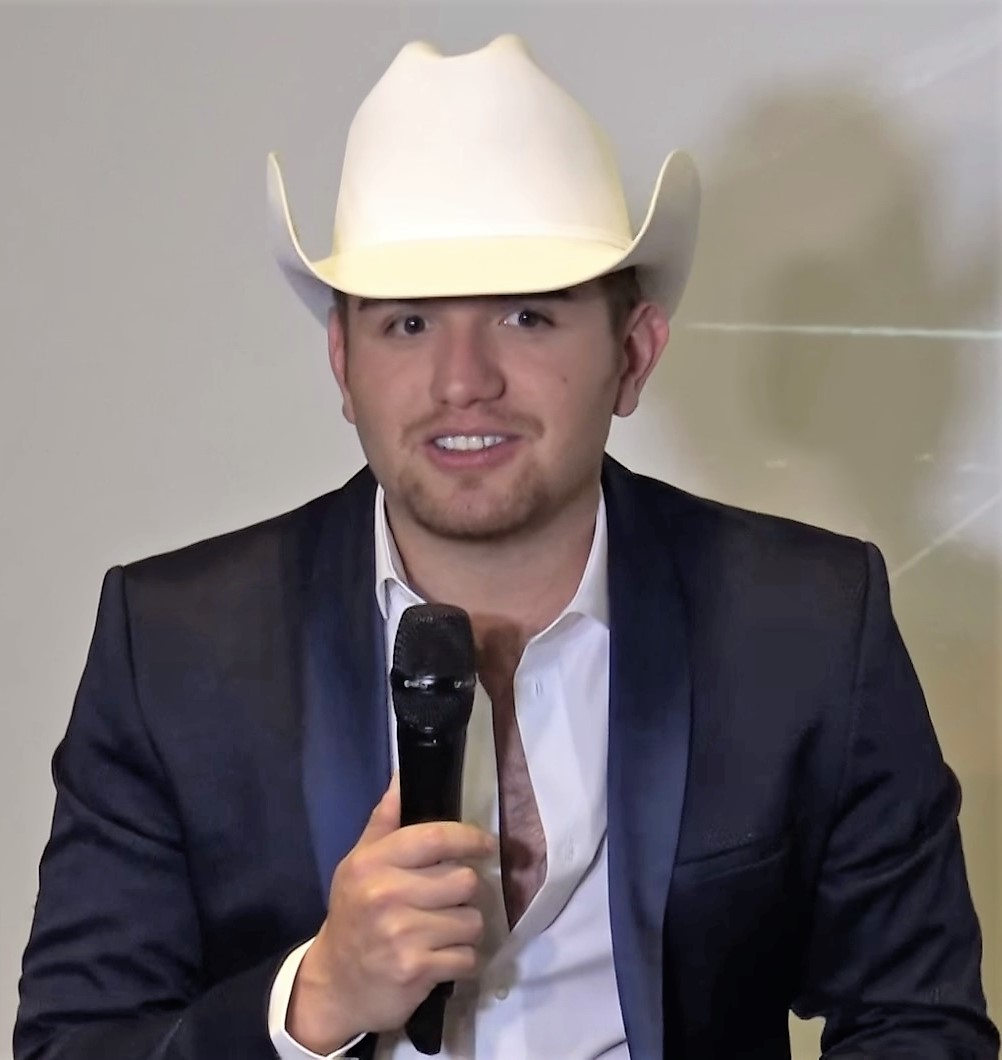
- El Dasa interviewed in 2017

Background information
- Born: Dasahev López Saavedra; July 27, 1990 (age 36); Hermosillo, Sonora, Mexico
- Genre: Regional Mexican
- Occupations: Singer, songwriter, actor
- Years active: 2008–present
- Label: Fonovisa Records
- Website: El Dasa – Facebook

Dasahev López Saavedra (born July 27, 1990), better known as El Dasa, is a Mexican singer from Hermosillo, Sonora. El Dasa has been nominated for two Latin Grammy Awards.

== Early life and career ==
At age 15, El Dasa became the lead singer of Banda Costa Azul, from Hermosillo, Sonora. He participated in the last edition of Mexico's La Academia 6: Última Generación, but he was eliminated in the second round. At age 18, he emigrated to Los Angeles where he was hired by Vicente Fernandez as his driver, where El Dasa would sing for his idol. The Mexican icon was moved by El Dasa's singing and invited him on-stage with him at the Gibson Amphitheater to duet on "Amor de los Dos," and encouraged the audience to support his career.

On 2016, NBC Universo released a series by the name of El Vato inspired on the real-life story of El Dasa, the principal actor of the series.

In August 2017, the second season of El Vato Premiered on NBC Universo. This season continued to tell the real-life story of El Dasa.

In late 2020, he was declared the winner of the first season of Tu cara me suena.

== Discography ==
- Pa' La Raza (2012)
- Alegre y Enamorado (2014)
- Muve Sessions Alegre y Enamorado (2014)
- ’’ El Hijo del Desierto ‘’ (2017)
- Pedro Infante 100 Años (2017)
