= Secreto de Amor (song) =

Single by Joan Sebastian

from the album Secreto de Amor
- Language: Spanish
- B-side: "El Muchacho Triste"
- Released: 2000
- Genre: Bolero
- Length: 4:35
- Label: Musart; Horus
- Songwriter: José Manuel Figueroa
- Producer: Joan Sebastian

Joan Sebastian singles chronology
"Gracias Por Tanto Amor" (1998)	"Secreto de Amor" (2000)	"Amorcito Mio" / "Que No Te Asombre" (2000)

Secreto de Amor
- Joan Sebastian – Secreto De Amor (Video Oficial) on YouTube

"Secreto de Amor" (English: "Secret of Love") is a song by Mexican singer-songwriter Joan Sebastian, released as the first single and title track from Sebastian's 27th studio album, Secreto de Amor. Written and produced by Sebastian, it is often regarded as one of his signature songs, being covered by many artists including Lucero, Victor García, and Vicente Fernández Jr., son of Vicente Fernández. It was notably used as the theme for the Venezuelan telenovela of the same name.

The song debuted at No. 23 on the Billboard Hot Latin Songs chart, and peaked at No. 3 after spending eight weeks later, becoming Sebastian's third top-ten entry on the chart. It also peaked at No. 25 on the Billboard Bubbling Under Hot 100, and topped the Billboard Regional Mexican Airplay chart.

== Charts ==
Chart performance for "Secreto de Amor"
Chart (2000)	Peak position
US Bubbling Under Hot 100 (Billboard)	25
US Hot Latin Songs (Billboard)	3
