= Lo Dijo el Corazón =

Studio album by Joan Sebastian
- Released: 19 February 2002
- Label: Musart
- Producer: Joan Sebastian

Joan Sebastian chronology
En Vivo: Desde la Plaza El Progreso en Guadalajara (2001)	Lo Dijo el Corazón (2002)	Afortunado (2002)

Lo Dijo el Corazón (The Heart Said It) is an album by Joan Sebastian, released in 19 February 2002, through the record label Musart Records. In 2003, the album earned Sebastian a Grammy Award for Best Mexican/Mexican-American Album.

== Track listing ==
All songs written by Sebastian.

1. "Cascadita de Te Quieros" – 3:00
2. "Ciega y Loca" – 3:00
3. "Piromaniaco" – 2:51
4. "Tenme Fe" – 3:47
5. "El Pisotón" – 3:17
6. "Que Bonita Pareja" – 3:00
7. "Manantial de Llanto" – 3:32
8. "Besos Peregrinos" – 3:46
9. "Barrio Viejo" – 2:52
10. "Dos Opciones" – 3:27
11. "Lo Dijo el Corazón" – 3:36
12. "A Gu Gu Di Di da Da" – 3:33

== Chart performance ==
Chart (2002)	Peak position
US Billboard Top Latin Albums	7
US Billboard Regional Mexican Albums	3
US Billboard Independent Albums	22
US Billboard Heatseekers Albums	48
