= Tu cara me suena (American TV series) =

American Spanish-language reality television series

- Genre: Reality competition
- Based on: Your Face Sounds Familiar
- Presented by: Ana Brenda Contreras; Rafael Araneda
- Judges: Angélica Vale; Jesús Navarro; Kany García; Charytín Goyco; Victor Manuelle; Eden Muñoz
- Country of origin: United States
- Original language: Spanish
- No. of seasons: 2
- No. of episodes: 13

Production
- Producer: Claudia Letelier
- Production locations: Cisneros Studios; Miami, Florida
- Camera setup: Multiple camera
- Running time: 120-150 minutes
- Production companies: Endemol Shine Boomdog; TelevisaUnivision

Original release
- Network: Univision; Las Estrellas
- Release: October 4, 2020 – May 8, 2022

Tu cara me suena is an American Spanish-language reality television series that premiered on Univision on October 4, 2020. It is based on both the Endemol format Your Face Sounds Familiar and an adaptation of the Spanish Tu cara me suena. The show is hosted by actress Ana Brenda Contreras, alongside Rafael Araneda.

The series has been renewed for a second season that premiered on March 27, 2022, airing simultaneously on Univision and Las Estrellas.

== Format ==
Eight celebrities will compete in a song and dance number while impersonating iconic singers. Each week, the "Randomizer" will assign the artists of whom they will impersonate. When the randomizer is pressed, the icon the contestant is assigned will be shown, along with a preview of the song they have to perform. The judges award points to each performance and celebrities can also give points to fellow participants. The celebrity with the most points will be declared the winner of the night and receive a prize for the charity they represent. The winner of the season will receive the biggest prize for their charity.

== Cast ==
=== Cast timeline ===
Color key:

| Host | Judge | Backstage Reporter |

| Cast member | Seasons | |
| Cast member | 1 | 2 |
|---|---|---|
| Ana Brenda Contreras | | |
| Rafael Araneda | | |
| Angélica Vale | | |
| Charytín Goyco | | |
| Jesús Navarro | | |
| Kany García | | |
| Amara La Negra | | |
| Victor Manuelle | | |
| Eden Muñoz | | |

== Series overview ==
| Season | Premiere | Finale | Winner | Second place | Third place | Host(s) | Judges | | | |
|---|---|---|---|---|---|---|---|---|---|---|
| 1 | October 4, 2020 | November 29, 2020 | El Dasa | Chantal Andere | Gabriel Coronel | Ana Brenda Contreras; Rafael Araneda | Angelica Vale | Kany García | Jesús Navarro | Charytín Goyco |
| 2 | March 27, 2022 | May 8, 2022 | Michael Stuart | Manny Cruz | Helen Ochoa | Ana Brenda Contreras; Rafael Araneda | Angelica Vale | Victor Manuelle | Eden Muñoz | Charytín Goyco |

== Ratings ==
Viewership and ratings per season of Tu cara me suena
| Season | Timeslot (ET) | Episodes | First aired | | Last aired | | Avg. viewers (millions) |
| Season | Timeslot (ET) | Episodes | Date | Viewers (millions) | Date | Viewers (millions) | Avg. viewers (millions) |
|---|---|---|---|---|---|---|---|
| 1 | Sunday 8:00 p.m. | 6 | October 4, 2020 | 1.40 | November 29, 2020 | 1.80 | 1.49 |
| 2 | Sunday 8:00 p.m. | 7 | March 27, 2022 | 1.40 | May 8, 2022 | 1.40 | 1.33 |
