= En Vivo: Desde la Plaza El Progreso en Guadalajara =

Live album by Joan Sebastian
- Released: 4 September 2001
- Genre: Regional Mexican
- Label: Musart
- Producer: Joan Sebastian

Joan Sebastian chronology
Un Cariño Como Tú (2001)	En Vivo: Desde la Plaza El Progreso en Guadalajara (2001)	Lo Dijo el Corazón (2002)

En Vivo: Desde la Plaza El Progreso en Guadalajara (Eng.: Live: From Plaza El Progreso en Guadalajara') is the title of the second live album released by Mexican singer-songwriter Joan Sebastian. This album became his first number-one hit on the Billboard Top Latin Albums chart. En Vivo was nominated for a 2002 Lo Nuestro Award for Regional/Mexican Album of the Year.

== Track listing ==
All songs written by Joan Sebastian, except where noted.

1. Juliantla — 0:50
2. Sembrador de Amor/Manantial (José Manuel Figueroa) — 4:08
3. Contigo O Sin Ti (José Manuel Figueroa) — 4:26
4. Hasta Que Amanezca/Esa Noche — 3:07
5. Veinticinco Rosas — 4:24
6. Tatuajes — 3:56
7. Gracias Por Tanto Amor — 3:24
8. El Toro — 4:09
9. Cincuenta Años — 3:45
10. El Primer Tonto — 3:46
11. Un Idiota — 4:08
12. Secreto de Amor — 5:26
13. Aunque Me Duela el Alma — 2:38
14. Como Tu Decidas (José Manuel Figueroa) — 3:02
15. Recuerdame Bonito — 3:10

== Credits ==
This information from Allmusic.

- Joan Sebastían: Harmonica, director, producer
- Enrique Martinez: Accordion, keyboards, music direction
- César Benítez: keyboards
- David Bojorges: Operation
- Alejandro Carballo: Trombone
- Daniel Estevez: Engineer
- Martin Flores: percussion, drums
- Robert Incelli: Saxophone
- Harry Kim: Trumpet
- Margarita Luna: vocals
- Rocío Marron: Violin
- Francisco Miranda: Engineer
- Fernando Roldán: Engineer
- Ramon Stagnaro: Guitar acoustic and electric.
- Enzo Villaparedes: Trumpet

== Chart performance ==
Chart (2001)	Peak position
US Billboard Top Latin Albums	1
US Billboard Regional Mexican Albums	1
US Billboard Top Independent Albums	9
US Billboard Top Heatseekers Albums	5
US Billboard 200	194

== Sales and certifications ==
Region	Certification	Certified units/sales
United States (RIAA)	2× Platinum (Latin)	200,000^{^}
^{^} Shipments figures based on certification alone.
