= Joan Sebastian =

Mexican singer (1951–2015)

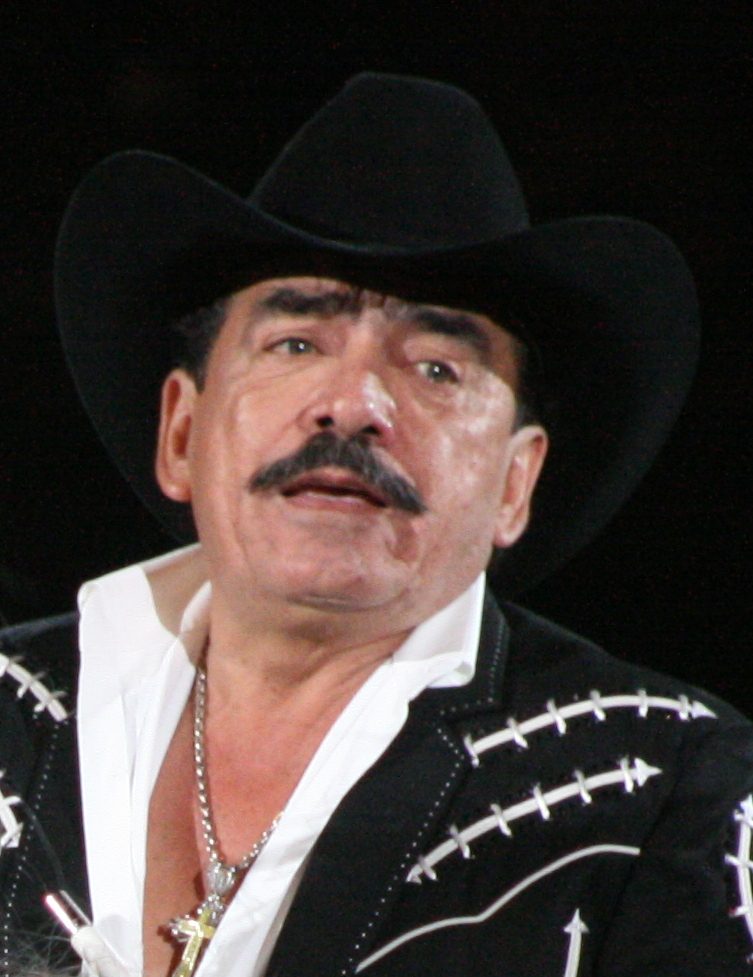
- Joan Sebastian in 2009
- Born: José Manuel Figueroa Figueroa; April 8, 1951; Juliantla, Guerrero, Mexico
- Died: July 13, 2015 (aged 64); Teacalco, Guerrero, Mexico
- Occupations: Singer; songwriter
- Children: 8
- Musical career
- Genres: Regional Mexican; mariachi; norteño; banda; country; Latin pop; soft rock
- Instruments: Vocals, Guitar
- Years active: 1975–2015
- Labels: . First record label was Capitol Records in Mexico.: Musart; Fonovisa; Universal Latin
- Website: joansebastian.com

José Manuel Figueroa Figueroa Sr. (April 8, 1951 – July 13, 2015), known professionally as Joan Sebastian (pronounced [ɟʝoˈan seβasˈtjan]), was a Mexican singer and songwriter. Born in Juliantla, Guerrero, he composed more than 1,000 songs, including compositions for artists such as Bronco, Vicente Fernández, Lucero, Pepe Aguilar, and Rocío Dúrcal. The first several years of his career were primarily focused on Soft rock and Latin pop songs, but later focused primarily on regional Mexican music, specifically banda, mariachi, and norteño. Throughout his career, he also recorded various country songs in Spanish. Sebastian was awarded seven Latin Grammy Awards and five Grammy Awards, making him the most awarded Mexican performer in Grammy history.

Known for composing "Así es la Vida", Sebastian also worked sporadically as an actor. In 1996, he made his acting debut in the Mexican soap opera Tú y Yo (You and I), sharing credits with Maribel Guardia, his former wife and mother to his son, Julian. In 2015, Sebastian died at the age of 64 of bone cancer. At the time of his death, Sebastian had two number-one albums on the Billboard Top Latin Albums chart and seven top ten songs on the Hot Latin Songs chart in the United States, including "Eso Y Más", "Me Gustas", "Secreto de Amor", and "Más Allá del Sol".

== Early life ==
Joan Sebastian was born in the rural town of Juliantla in Guerrero. He began composing at the age of seven. His mother enrolled him in a school near Guanajuato when he was eight years old, and returned to his hometown three years later.

At age fourteen, his father sent him away to a monastery in Morelos where he was under the care of Father David Salgado. Due to the clergyman's influence on Sebastian, he considered becoming a priest. He enrolled in the Seminario Conciliar de San José in Cuernavaca, Morelos, but realized that he wanted to pursue a music career, and decided to leave the seminary to dedicate himself to music.

== Career ==
Before embarking on a singing career, Sebastian was an administrative assistant at a vacation resort in Oaxtepec, Morelos, where he would sing through the intercom. In 1968, Sebastian met Mexican actress Angelica Maria. They stayed together and she asked him to sing some songs for her. She suggested to Sebastian that he record the songs and give them to music producer Eduardo Magallanes, though Sebastian never managed to contact him. He later moved to Mexico City and began asking Discos Capitals Records to listen to his music and produce it. In 1974, he recorded his first album, Pedro Parrandas, and received positive feedback from the public.

In 1977, Sebastian decided to stop using his legal name, Jose Manuel Figueroa and took on his artistic name, Joan Sebastian, partly in tribute to San Sebastian, where he previously worked. That same year, he signed a record deal with the label Musart. Later on he would make his known hit "Juliantla" and the famous duet "Maracas" with Alberto Vazquéz. In 2000, he released Secreto de Amor which was certified 4× platinum in the Latin field in the United States by the Recording Industry Association of America (RIAA). The album and title track won the Lo Nuestro Awards for Regional Mexican Album of the Year and Regional Mexican Song of the Year; he also received the Excellence Award for his musical contributions.

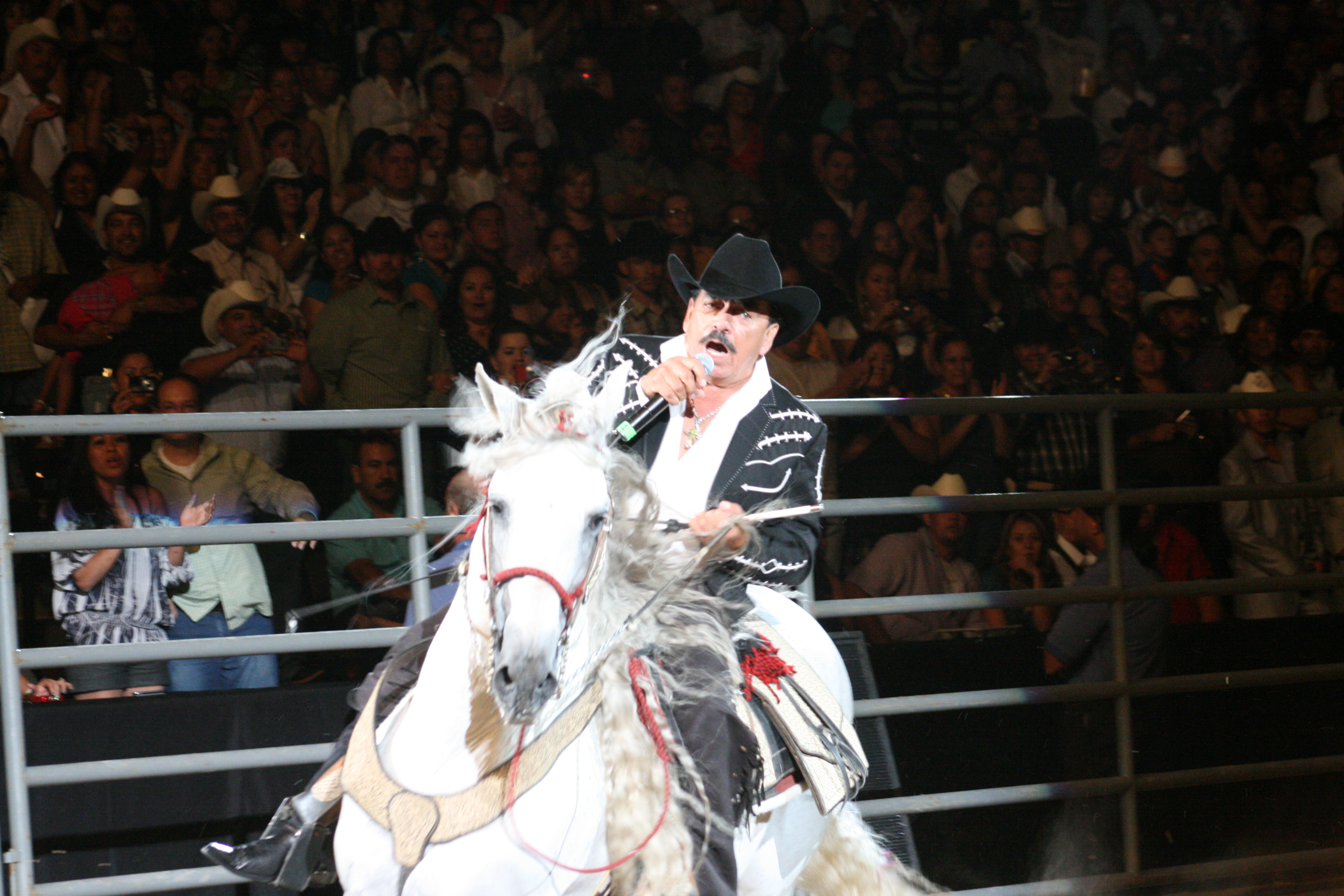
Sebastian horse riding and performing at the Pepsi Center in 2009

In 2006, Sebastian was inducted into the Billboard Latin Music Hall of Fame for his prolific songwriting and musical arrangements. Sebastian was awarded Songwriter of the Year three times by ASCAP and received the Golden Note Award in 2007 in recognition of his songwriting career.

In 2012, Joan Sebastian teamed up with American songwriter and producer Will.i.am for the song and video "Hey You."

== Personal life ==
Sebastian had eight children from five different women. Their names are José Manuel Figueroa González (who is also a singer and songwriter), Juan Sebastián Figueroa González, Trigo de Jesús Figueroa González (first three children with Teresa González, his first wife), Zarelea Figueroa Ocampo (who is also a singer and songwriter), Julián Figueroa Fernández (son of Maribel Guardia, also a singer), Joana Marcelia Figueroa Espín, Juliana Joeri Figueroa Alonso and D'Yavé Figueroa Espín. His third oldest son, Trigo, was shot in the back of the head after one of his father's concerts in Mission, Texas, on August 27, 2006. Trigo had been trying to control the crowd after the show. He was transported to McAllen Medical Center where he was pronounced dead.

On June 12, 2010, his second oldest son, Juan Sebastián was shot dead in Cuernavaca, Morelos, after arriving at a night club with some friends and being refused entrance. Joan Sebastian said his son's death had nothing to do with the Mexican drug cartels.

A few months after his death, Televisa announced that a series about his life would begin filming. His youngest son, Julian Figueroa, portrayed his father in his younger days, while his older son, José Manuel Figueroa, portrayed his father in his later days. Livia Brito was also confirmed to portray Maribel Guardia. The series Por Siempre Joan Sebastian premiered on June 27, 2016 on Univision and concluded on July 25, 2016. Julian passed away on April 9, 2023 from a heart attack at the age of 27

== Illness and death ==
Joan Sebastian was first diagnosed with bone cancer in 1999. He underwent cancer treatment and survived; however, he announced that the cancer had returned in 2007. Undergoing cancer treatment once again, he later announced he was in remission. On July 26, 2012, during one of his concerts, he announced that the cancer had returned for the third time. In 2014, he revealed that he was battling cancer for the fourth time during his performances in Zacatecas.

Weeks prior to his death, he confirmed to the media that he had been hospitalized and undergoing cancer treatment under medical supervision. On July 13, 2015, Joan Sebastian died at 7:15pm (UTC-06:00) at his ranch Cruz de la Sierra, Teacalco Guerrero, Mexico, due to bone cancer. He was 64 years old. His body was buried in a cemetery in Juliantla near his son Trigo.

Relatives of the late singer complained in July 2020 that Sebastian's mausoleum had been broken into and the family feared that his remains might be stolen. Security measures were increased.

== Discography ==
Sebastian recorded the following studio albums during his music career:

=== Studio albums ===
- Mi Mujer (1975) (first album on Musart)
- Y Las Mariposas (1977)
- Con Mariachi Vargas de Tecalitlan (1984)
- Rumores (1985)
- Oiga (1986)
- Mascarada (1987)
- Norteño (1987)
- Cariño Como Tú (1990)
- Norteño Vol. 2 (1990)
- Bandido de Amores (1992)
- El Peor de Tus Antojos (1993)
- En Vivo En La Mexico (1995)
- Con Mariachi (1996)
- Tu y Yo (1996)
- Gracias Por Tanto Amor (1998)
- Rey del Jaripeo (1999)
- Nostalgia y Recuerdos (2000)
- Secreto de Amor (2000)
- En Vivo: Desde la Plaza El Progreso en Guadalajara (2001)
- Lo Dijo el Corazón (2002)
- Afortunado (2002)
- Mujeres Bonitas (2003)
- Que Amarren a Cupido (2004)
- Inventario (2005)
- Canta Para Ti (2006)
- De Relajo y Pa' Bailar (2006)
- Más Allá del Sol (2006)
- No Es de Madera (2007)
- Pegadito al Corazón (2009) (last album on Musart & first album on Fonovisa)
- Joan Sebastian En Vivo (2009)
- Huevos Rancheros (2011)
- Un Lujo (2012)
- 13 Celebrando el 13 (2013)
- Corridos con Banda (2013)
- Celedon Sin Fronteras 2 (2014)
- El Ultimo Jaripeo (2017)
- Atemporal (2020)

== Billboard Hot Latin Songs singles ==
https://www.billboard.com/artist/joan-sebastian/chart-history/htl/

- Un Idiota (#2)
- Te Irá Mejor Sin Mí (#2)
- Secreto de Amor (#3)
- Me Gustas (#3)
- Oiga (#4)
- Manantial de Llanto (#4)
- El Padrino (#4)
- Eso y Más (#6)
- Vienticinco Rosas (#10)
- Mascarada (#13)
- El Primer Tonto (#15)
- El Perdedor (#16)
- Contigo o Sin Ti (#19)
- Amorcito Mío (#19)
- Y las Mariposas (#21)
- Afortunado (#21)
- Hasta Que Amanezca (#22)
- Así Te Quiero (#23)
- Alma de Niña (#24)
- Caricatura (#24)
- Gracias Por Tanto Amor (#24)
- Porqué Te Quise (#24)
- Llorar (#25)
- Amar Como Te Amé (#26)
- Que Diós Bendiga (#26)
- El Peor de Tus Antojos (#29)
- Diseñame (#31)
- Cascadita de Te Quieros (#32)
- Sigo Vivo (#35)
- Lobo Domesticado (#37)
- Pienso en Ti (#39)
- Sentimental (#42)
- Si Está Volviendo Loco (#44)
- Como Olvidar (#44)
- Que Bonita Pareja (#46)
- El General (#49)
- Barrio Viejo (#49)
- Volví Pa'l Pueblo (#49)

== Awards and nominations ==
Year	Award	Category	Work	Result	Ref.
2002	Grammy Award	Best Mexican/Mexican-American Album	Lo Dijo el Corazón	Won	
2002	Latin Grammy Award	Best Grupero Album	Lo Dijo el Corazón	Won	
2003	Grammy Award	Best Mexican/Mexican-American Album	Afortunado	Won	
2003	Latin Grammy Award	Best Regional Mexican Song	"Afortunado"	Won	
2003	Latin Grammy Award	Best Banda Album	Afortunado	Won	
2006	Grammy Award	Best Banda Album	Más Allá del Sol	Won	
2006	Latin Grammy Award	Best Banda Album	Más Allá del Sol	Won	
2006	Latin Grammy Award	Best Grupero Album	En el Auditorio Nacional	Won	
2008	Grammy Award	Best Banda Album	No Es de Madera	Won	
2008	Latin Grammy Award	Best Regional Mexican Song	"Estos Celos"	Won	

== See also ==
- List of best-selling Latin music artists
