= The King Stays King: Sold Out at Madison Square Garden =

Live album by Romeo Santos
- Released: November 6, 2012
- Recorded: February 11–23, 2012
- Venues: Madison Square Garden, New York City, New York
- Genres: Bachata; R&B
- Length: 78:35
- Language: Spanish
- Label: Sony Latin

Romeo Santos chronology
Formula, Vol. 1 (2011)	The King Stays King: Sold Out at Madison Square Garden (2012)	Formula, Vol. 2 (2014)

Singles from The King Stays King: Sold Out at Madison Square Garden
- 1. "Llévame Contigo" Released: August 20, 2012

Professional ratings
Review scores
Source	Rating
AllMusic	3.5/5 stars

The King Stays King: Sold Out at Madison Square Garden is the first live album and first concert film by American singer Romeo Santos as a solo artist. It is based on 3 concerts that sold out 3 nights in a row at Madison Square Garden on February 11, 23, and 24, of 2012. This was part of The King Stays King tour. The film version was made for DVD in which it was released on the same day as the audio CD version. It is also available on HBO Max. It is his first concert film as a solo artist as well.

== Track listing ==
All tracks are written by Anthony "Romeo" Santos, except where noted.

No.	Title	Writer(s)	Length
1.	"You"		4:00
2.	"La Diabla"		3:44
3.	"Malevo"		4:05
4.	"Por Un Segundo"		2:46
5.	"Que Se Mueran"		3:55
6.	"Su Veneno"		3:52
7.	"Mi Corazoncito" (featuring P. Diddy)		4:04
8.	"Debate de 4" (featuring Anthony Santos & Luis Vargas)		4:55
9.	"Magia Negra"		3:48
10.	"Soberbio"		4:15
11.	"Llévame Contigo"		3:49
12.	"La Bella & la Bestia"		3:47
13.	"Medley: La Película/Enséñame a Olvidar/Todavía Me Amas"		8:25
14.	"Vale La Pena El Placer"		3:04
15.	"Medley: Rival/All Aboard"	Santos; Dwayne Michael Carter Jr.; Rico Love; Pierre Medor	3:12
16.	"Noche de Sexo" (featuring Wisin & Yandel)	Josías de la Cruz; Juan Luis Morera Luna; Llandel Veguilla Malavé; Santos	3:42
17.	"Mi Santa"		3:57
18.	"Promise" (featuring Usher)		9:15
Total length:			78:35

=== DVD & Digital Film ===
Included Acts. These acts are actually videos in between songs about Romeo Santos talking about various topics.

- Act 1: Show Open
1. You - 4:01
2. La Diabla - 3:45
3. Malevo - 4:06
4. Por Un Segundo - 2:47
- Act 2: Rituals & Younger Days
5. Que Se Mueran - 3:56
6. Su Veneno - 3:53
7. Mi Corazoncito (featuring P. Diddy) - 4:12
- Act 3: New York & 3 Homes
8. Debate de 4 (featuring Anthony Santos & Luis Vargas) - 4:47
9. Magia Negra - 3:49
10. Soberbio - 4:16
11. Llévame Contigo - 3:49
12. La Bella Y La Bestia - 3:48
- Act 4: The Love Of His Fans
13. Medley: La Película/Enséñame A Olvidar/Todavía Me Amas - 8:25
- Act 5: Being An Artist
14. Vale La Pena El Placer - 3:04
15. Medley: Rival/All Aboard - 3:12
16. Noche de Sexo (featuring Wisin & Yandel) - 3:43
17. Mi Santa - 3:58
- Act 6: Closing
18. Promise (featuring Usher) - 9:16
- Credits

Bonus Footage

1. Backstage
2. Halloween

== Personnel ==
- Bass Guitar - Adan Gomez
- Guitar - Alexander "Chi Chi" Caba
- Guitar, Vocals - Eric "Bori" Rivera
- Congas - Guillermo Frias
- Composer, Piano - Joaquin Diaz
- Keyboards - Joel Liberato
- Drums - Jotan Afanador
- Bongos - Leonardo Zapata Reyes
- Guira - Radhames Reyes Zapata
- Rhythm Guitar - Wilmore "Bimbo" Franco

== Charts ==
=== Weekly charts ===
Chart (2012)	Peak position
Argertine Albums (CAPIF)	8
Chilean Albums (FeriaDelDisco)	5
US Billboard 200	65
US Top Latin Albums (Billboard)	1
US Tropical Albums (Billboard)	1
Venezuelan Albums (Recordland)	16

=== Year-end charts ===
Chart (2013)	Position
US Top Latin Albums (Billboard)	12
US Tropical Albums (Billboard)	4

== Certifications ==
Region	Certification	Certified units/sales
Argentina (CAPIF)	Gold	20,000^{^}
Mexico (AMPROFON)	Gold	30,000^{^}
^{^} Shipments figures based on certification alone.

== See also ==
- List of number-one Billboard Latin Albums from the 2010s
- List of number-one Billboard Tropical Albums from the 2010s
