= 2013 Latin Billboard Music Awards =

Annual American music awards ceremony

2013 Billboard Latin Music Awards
- Date: April 25, 2013
- Venue: BankUnited Center, University of Miami, Coral Gables, Florida

The 2013 Billboard Latin Music Awards were held on April 25, 2013.

== Awards ==
=== Artists ===
==== Artist of the Year ====
- Jenni Rivera
- Don Omar
- Prince Royce
- Romeo Santos

==== New Artist of the Year ====
- 3Ball MTY
- Juan Magan
- Jesus Ojeda y Sus Parientes
- Michel Teló

==== Social Artist of the Year ====
- Shakira

==== Streaming Artist of the Year ====
- Don Omar—Winner

==== Streaming Song of the Year ====
- Don Omar and Lucenzo — Winner Danza Kuduro”

==== Hot Latin Song of the Year ====
- Don Omar featuring Natty Natasha — Dutty Love
- 3Ball MTY featuring El Bebeto and America Sierra — Inténtalo
- Juan Magan featuring Pitbull and El Cata — Bailando Por El Mundo
- Michel Teló — Ai Se Eu Te Pego

==== Hot Latin Song of the Year, Vocal Event ====
- Don Omar featuring Natty Natasha — Dutty Love
- 3Ball MTY featuring El Bebeto and America Sierra — Inténtalo
- Juan Magan featuring Pitbull and El Cata — Bailando Por El Mundo
- Wisin & Yandel featuring Chris Brown and T-Pain — Algo Me Gusta de Ti

==== Hot Latin Songs Artist of the Year, Male ====
- Don Omar
- Daddy Yankee
- Pitbull
- Prince Royce

==== Hot Latin Songs Artist of the Year, Female ====
- Shakira
- Leslie Grace
- Jennifer Lopez
- Jenni Rivera

==== Hot Latin Songs Artist of the Year, Duo or Group ====
- La Arrolladora Banda El Limón de René Camacho
- Banda Sinaloense el Recodo de Cruz Lizárraga
- Calibre 50
- Wisin & Yandel

==== Airplay Label of the Year ====
- Universal Music Latin Entertainment

==== Airplay Imprint of the Year ====
- Disa

==== Airplay Song of the Year ====
- Don Omar featuring Natti Natasha — Dutty Love
- La Arrolladora Banda El Limón de René Camacho — Llamada de Mi Ex
- Juan Magan featuring Pitbull and El Cata — Bailando Por El Mundo
- Michel Teló — Ai Se Eu Te Pego

==== Digital Song of the Year ====
- Don Omar featuring Natti Natasha — Dutty Love
- Don Omar featuring Lucenzo — Danza Kuduro
- Romeo Santos featuring Usher — Promise
- Michel Teló — Ai Se Eu Te Pego

==== Crossover Artist of the Year ====
- Rihanna
- Chris Brown
- Flo Rida
- PSY

=== Top Latin Albums ===
==== Latin Album of the Year ====
- Romeo Santos — Formula, Vol. 1
- Jenni Rivera — Joyas Prestadas (Pop)
- Jenni Rivera — La Misma Gran Señora
- Prince Royce — Phase II

==== Top Latin Albums Artist of the Year, Male ====
- Prince Royce
- Don Omar
- Gerardo Ortiz
- Romeo Santos

==== Top Latin Albums Artist of the Year, Female ====
- Jenni Rivera
- Ednita Nazario
- Shakira
- Yuridia

==== Top Latin Albums Artist of the Year, Duo or Group ====
- Maná
- 3Ball MTY
- La Arrolladora Banda El Limón de René Camacho
- Wisin & Yandel

==== Digital Album of the Year ====
- Romeo Santos — Formula, Vol. 1
- Don Omar — Don Omar Presents MTO²: New Generation
- Prince Royce — Phase II
- Wisin & Yandel — Líderes

==== Top Latin Albums Label of the Year ====
- Universal Music Latin Entertainment

==== Top Latin Albums Imprint of the Year ====
- Fonovisa Records

=== Latin Pop ===
==== Latin Pop Airplay Song of the Year ====
- Michel Teló — Ai Se Eu Te Pego
- Jesse & Joy — ¡Corre!
- Shakira — Addicted to You
- Wisin Y Yandel featuring Chris Brown and T-Pain — Algo Me Gusta de Ti

==== Latin Pop Airplay Artist of the Year, Solo ====
- Shakira
- Ricardo Arjona
- Enrique Iglesias
- Michel Teló

==== Latin Pop Airplay Artist of the Year, Duo or Group ====
- Jesse & Joy
- Maná
- Reik
- Wisin & Yandel

==== Latin Pop Airplay Label of the Year ====
- Sony Music Latin

==== Latin Pop Airplay Imprint of the Year ====
- Sony Music Latin

==== Latin Pop Album of the Year ====
- Jenni Rivera — Joyas Prestadas (Pop)
- Ricardo Arjona — Independiente
- Maná — Drama y Luz
- Alejandro Sanz — La Música No Se Toca

==== Latin Pop Albums Artist of the Year, Solo ====
- Jenni Rivera
- Ricardo Arjona
- Alejandro Sanz
- Shakira

==== Latin Pop Albums Artist of the Year, Duo or Group ====
- Maná
- Camila
- Il Volo
- Jesse & Joy

==== Latin Pop Albums Label of the Year ====
- Universal Music Latin Entertainment

==== Latin Pop Albums Imprint of the Year ====
- Sony Music Latin

=== Latin World Tour ===
==== Latin Touring Artist of the Year ====
- 'Enrique Iglesias and Jennifer López Tour'
- Vicente Fernández
- GIGANT3S: Marc Anthony, Chayanne & Marco Antonio Solís
- Maná

=== Tropical ===
==== Tropical Song of the Year ====
- Prince Royce — Incondicional
- Romeo Santos — La Diabla
- Prince Royce — Las Cosas Pequeñas
- Romeo Santos & Usher — Promises

==== Tropical Songs Artist of the Year, Solo ====
- Prince Royce

==== Tropical Songs Artist of the Year, Duo or Group ====
- Chino & Nacho

==== Tropical Songs Airplay Label of the Year ====
- Sony Music Latin

==== Tropical Songs Airplay Imprint of the Year ====
- Top Stop

==== Tropical Album of the Year ====
- Romeo Santos — Formula, Vol. 1

==== Tropical Albums Artist of the Year, Solo ====
- Prince Royce

==== Tropical Albums Artist of the Year, Duo or Group ====
- Aventura

==== Tropical Albums Label of the Year ====
- Sony Music Latin

==== Tropical Albums Imprint of the Year ====
- Sony Music Latin

=== Regional Mexican ===
==== Regional Mexican Song of the Year ====
- 3BallMTY and El Bebeto y América Sierra — Inténtalo
- Gerardo Ortíz — Amor Confuso
- La Arrolladora Banda El Limón — Llamada De Mi Ex
- Espinoza Paz — Un Hombre Normal

==== Regional Mexican Songs Artist of the Year, Solo ====
- Gerardo Ortiz

==== Regional Mexican Songs Artist of the Year, Duo or Group ====
- La Arrolladora Banda El Limón De Rene Camacho

==== Regional Mexican Airplay Label of the Year ====
- Universal Music Latin Entertainment

==== Regional Mexican Airplay Imprint of the Year ====
- Disa

==== Regional Mexican Album of the Year ====
- Jenni Rivera La Misma Gran Señora

==== Regional Mexican Albums Artist of the Year, Solo ====
- Jenni Rivera

==== Regional Mexican Albums Artist of the Year, Duo or Group ====
- La Arrolladora Banda El Limón De Rene Camacho

==== Regional Mexican Albums Label of the Year ====
- Universal Music Latin Entertainment

==== Regional Mexican Albums Imprint of the Year ====
- Fonovisa Records

=== Latin Rhythm ===
==== Latin Rhythm Song of the Year ====
- Don Omar & Natti Natasha — Dutty Love
- Juan Magan ft Pitbull and El Cata — Bailando Por El Mundo
- Don Omar — Hasta Que Salga el Sol
- Lovumba — Daddy Yankee

==== Latin Rhythm Songs Artist of the Year, Solo ====
- Don Omar

==== Latin Rhythm Songs Artist of the Year, Duo or Group ====
- Wisin & Yandel

==== Latin Rhythm Airplay Label of the Year ====
- Universal Music Latin Entertainment

==== Latin Rhythm Airplay Imprint of the Year ====
- Machete Music

==== Latin Rhythm Album of the Year ====
- Don Omar — Don Omar Presents MT02: New Generation

==== Latin Rhythm Albums Artist of the Year, Solo ====
- Don Omar

==== Latin Rhythm Albums Artist of the Year, Duo or Group ====
- Wisin & Yandel

==== Latin Rhythm Albums Label of the Year ====
- Universal Music Latin Entertainment

==== Latin Rhythm Albums Imprint of the Year ====
- Machete Music

=== Writers, Producers, Publishers ===
==== Songwriter of the Year ====
- Isidro Chávez “Espinoza Paz” Espinoza

==== Publisher of the Year ====
- Arpa Musical, LLC, BMI

==== Publishing Corporation of the Year ====
- EMI Music

==== Producer of the Year ====
- Fernando Camacho Tirado

==== Spirit Of Hope ====
- Maná

==== Billboard Lifetime achievement award ====
- José José
