= 2012 Latin Billboard Music Awards =

Annual American music awards ceremony

2012 Billboard Latin Music Awards
- Date: April 26, 2012
- Venue: BankUnited Center, University of Miami, Coral Gables, Florida

The 2012 Billboard Latin Music Awards were held on April 26, 2012 at the BankUnited Center at the University of Miami in Coral Gables, Florida.

== Awards ==
=== Artists ===
==== Artist of the Year ====
- Maná
- Prince Royce
- Romeo Santos
- Shakira

==== Artist of the Year, New ====
- Calibre 50
- Il Volo
- La Adictiva Banda San José de Mesillas
- Violento

==== Hot Latin Song of the Year ====
- Don Omar and Lucenzo — Danza Kuduro
- Don Omar — Taboo
- Pitbull featuring Ne-Yo, Afrojack and Nayer — Give Me Everything
- Prince Royce — Corazón Sin Cara

==== Hot Latin Song of the Year, Vocal Event ====
- Don Omar featuring Lucenzo — Danza Kuduro
- Jennifer Lopez featuring Pitbull — On the Floor
- Pitbull featuring Ne-Yo, Afrojack and Nayer — Give Me Everything
- Romeo Santos featuring Usher — Promise

==== Hot Latin Songs Artist of the Year, Male ====
- Don Omar
- Enrique Iglesias
- Pitbull
- Prince Royce

==== Hot Latin Songs Artist of the Year, Female ====
- Alejandra Guzmán
- Jennifer Lopez
- Jenni Rivera
- Shakira

==== Hot Latin Songs Artist of the Year, Duo or Group ====
- Julion Alvarez y Su Norteño Banda
- La Adictiva Banda San José de Mesillas
- Maná
- Wisin & Yandel

==== Airplay Song of the Year ====
- Don Omar — Taboo
- La Adictiva Banda San José de Mesillas — "Te Amo y Te Amo"
- Pitbull featuring Ne-Yo, Afrojack and Nayer — Give Me Everything
- Prince Royce — Corazón Sin Cara

==== Digital Song of the Year ====
- Don Omar featuring Lucenzo — Danza Kuduro
- Pitbull — Bon, Bon
- Shakira featuring El Cata — Rabiosa
- Shakira featuring Freshlyground — Waka Waka (This Time For Africa)

==== Hot Latin Songs Airplay Label of the Year ====
- Sony Music Latin

==== Hot Latin Songs Airplay Imprint of the Year ====
- Disa

==== Crossover Artist of the Year ====
- Katy Perry
- LMFAO
- Rihanna
- Alexandra Stan

=== Top Latin Albums ===
==== Latin Album of the Year ====
- Cristian Castro — Viva el Príncipe
- Maná — Drama y Luz
- Prince Royce — Prince Royce
- Romeo Santos — Formula, Vol. 1

==== Top Latin Albums Artist of the Year, Male ====
- Cristian Castro
- Gerardo Ortíz
- Prince Royce
- Romeo Santos

==== Top Latin Albums Artist of the Year, Female ====
- Natalia Jiménez
- Jenni Rivera
- Gloria Trevi
- Shakira

==== Top Latin Albums Artist of the Year, Duo or Group ====
- Camila
- Los Bukis
- Maná
- Wisin & Yandel

==== Digital Album of the Year ====
- Maná — Drama y Luz
- Prince Royce — Prince Royce
- Romeo Santos — Formula, Vol. 1
- Shakira — Sale el Sol

==== Latin Albums Label of the Year ====
- Universal Music Latin Entertainment

==== Latin Albums Imprint of the Year ====
- Sony Music Latin

=== Latin Pop ===
==== Latin Pop Airplay Song of the Year ====
- Don Omar — Taboo
- Jennifer Lopez featuring Pitbull — On the Floor
- Maná — Lluvia al Corazón
- Pitbull featuring Ne-Yo, Afrojack and Nayer — Give Me Everything

==== Latin Pop Airplay Artist of the Year, Solo ====
- Don Omar
- Enrique Iglesias
- Pitbull
- Shakira

==== Latin Pop Airplay Artist of the Year, Duo or Group ====
- Camila
- Maná
- Reik
- Wisin & Yandel

==== Latin Pop Airplay Label of the Year ====
- Sony Music Latin

==== Latin Pop Airplay Imprint of the Year ====
- Sony Music Latin

==== Latin Pop Album of the Year ====
- Enrique Iglesias — Euphoria
- Maná — Drama y Luz
- Ricky Martin — Música + Alma + Sexo
- Cristian Castro — Viva el Príncipe

==== Latin Pop Albums Artist of the Year, Solo ====
- Cristian Castro
- Enrique Iglesias
- Ricky Martin
- Shakira

==== Latin Pop Albums Artist of the Year, Duo or Group ====
- Camila
- Il Volo
- Maná
- Reik

==== Latin Pop Albums Label of the Year ====
- Universal Music Latin Entertainment

==== Latin Pop Albums Imprint of the Year ====
- Universal Music Latino

=== Tropical ===
==== Tropical Song of the Year ====
- Prince Royce — Corazón Sin Cara
- Don Omar and Lucenzo — Danza Kuduro
- Romeo Santos featuring Usher — Promise
- Romeo Santos — You

==== Tropical Songs Artist of the Year, Solo ====
- Prince Royce

==== Tropical Songs Artist of the Year, Duo or Group ====
- Aventura

==== Tropical Songs Airplay Label of the Year ====
- Universal Music Latino

==== Tropical Songs Airplay Imprint of the Year ====
- Sony Music Latin

==== Tropical Album of the Year ====
- Prince Royce "Prince Royce"(Top Stop/Atlantic)

==== Tropical Albums Artist of the Year, Solo ====
- Prince Royce (Top Stop/Atlantic)

==== Tropical Albums Artist of the Year, Duo or Group ====
- Aventura (Premium Latin/Sony Music Latin)

==== Tropical Albums Label of the Year ====
- Sony Music Latin

==== Tropical Albums Imprint of the Year ====
- Sony Music Latin

=== Regional Mexican ===
==== Regional Mexican Song of the Year ====
- Julión Álvarez y Su Norteño Banda — Olvídame (Fonovisa)
- La Original Banda El Limón — Di que regresarás
- Fidel Rueda — Me encantaría
- La Adictiva — Te amo y te amo

==== Regional Mexican Songs Artist of the Year, Solo ====
- Gerardo Ortiz (DEL/Sony Music Latin)

==== Regional Mexican Songs Artist of the Year, Duo or Group ====
- Julion Álvarez y Su Norteño Banda (Fonovisa)

==== Regional Mexican Airplay Label of the Year ====
- Disa

==== Regional Mexican Airplay Imprint of the Year ====
- Disa

==== Regional Mexican Album of the Year ====
- Los Bukis "35 ANIVERSARIO" (Fontana/UMLE)

==== Regional Mexican Albums Artist of the Year, Solo ====
- Gerardo Ortiz (DEL/Sony Music Latin)

==== Regional Mexican Albums Artist of the Year, Duo or Group ====
- Los Bukis (Fontana/UMLE)

==== Regional Mexican Albums Label of the Year ====
- Universal Music Latin Entertainment

==== Regional Mexican Albums Imprint of the Year ====
- Fonovisa

=== Latin Rhythm ===
==== Latin Rhythm Song of the Year ====
- Don Omar featuring Lucenzo — Danza Kuduro (Orfanato/Machete/Universal Music Latino)
- Pitbull — Bon, Bon
- Don Omar — Taboo
- Wisin & Yandel — Estoy Enamorado

==== Latin Rhythm Songs Artist of the Year, Solo ====
- Don Omar (Orfanato/Machete/Universal Music Latino)

==== Latin Rhythm Songs Artist of the Year, Duo or Group ====
- Wisin & Yandel (WY/Machete/Universal Music Latino)

==== Latin Rhythm Airplay Label of the Year ====
- Universal Music Latino

==== Latin Rhythm Airplay Imprint of the Year ====
- Machete

==== Latin Rhythm Album of the Year ====
- Wisin & Yandel "Los Vaqueros: El Regreso" (WY/Machete/UMLE)

==== Latin Rhythm Albums Artist of the Year, Solo ====
- Don Omar (Orfanato/Machete/UMLE)

==== Latin Rhythm Albums Artist of the Year, Duo or Group ====
- Wisin & Yandel (WY/Machete/UMLE)

==== Latin Rhythm Albums Label of the Year ====
- Universal Music Latin Entertainment

==== Latin Rhythm Albums Imprint of the Year ====
- Machete

==== Social Artist of the Year ====
- Shakira (Sony Music Latin)

==== Latin Touring Artist of the Year ====
- Enrique Iglesias
- Maná
- Ricky Martin
- Luis Miguel

==== Songwriter of the Year ====
- Geoffrey "Prince Royce" Rojas

==== Publisher of the Year ====
- Marcha Musical Corporation, BMI

==== Publishing Corporation of the Year ====
- Sony/ATV Music

==== Producer of the Year ====
- A&X

==== Billboard Lifetime achievement award ====
- Intocable

==== Billboard Latin Music Hall of Fame ====
- Marc Anthony
