= List of number-one Billboard Tropical Songs of 2012 =

The Billboard Tropical Songs is a chart that ranks the best-performing tropical songs of the United States. Published by Billboard magazine, the data are compiled by Nielsen Broadcast Data Systems based collectively on each single's weekly airplay.

== Chart history ==
Issue date	Song	Artist	Ref
January 7	"Aires De Navidad"	N'Klabe with The Band Our Latin Thing	
January 14	"Hotel Nacional"	Gloria Estefan	
January 21	"Si tú me besas"	Víctor Manuelle	
January 28	"Promise"	Romeo Santos Featuring Usher	
February 4	"Las cosas pequeñas"	Prince Royce	
February 11	"Si tú me besas"	Víctor Manuelle	
February 18	"Si tú me besas"	Víctor Manuelle	
February 25	"Mi Santa"	Romeo Santos Featuring Tomatito	
March 3	"Mi Santa"	Romeo Santos Featuring Tomatito	
March 10	"Mi Santa"	Romeo Santos Featuring Tomatito	
March 17	"Las cosas pequeñas"	Prince Royce	
March 24	"Mi Santa"	Romeo Santos Featuring Tomatito	
March 31	"Bailando Por El Mundo"	Juan Magan Featuring Pitbull & El Cata	
April 7	"Dutty Love"	Don Omar Featuring Natty Natasha	
April 14	"¡Corre!"	Jesse & Joy Featuring La Republika	
April 21	"Si te digo la verdad"	Gocho	
April 28	"Fuiste Tú"	Ricardo Arjona Featuring Gaby Moreno	
May 5	La Señal	Juanes	
May 12	"La Banda"	N'Klabe	
May 19	"Yo no soy un monstruo"	Elvis Crespo Featuring Los Del Puente	
May 26	"Solo con un beso"	Jerry Rivera	
June 2	"Tu veneno"	Héctor Acosta	
June 9	"Yo no soy un monstruo"	Elvis Crespo Featuring Ilegales	
June 16	"Incondicional"	Prince Royce	
June 23	"Ella lo que quiere es salsa"	Víctor Manuelle Featuring Voltio & Jowell & Randy	
June 30	"Si te digo la verdad"	Gocho	
July 7	"Si te digo la verdad"	Gocho	
July 14	"La diabla"	Romeo Santos	
July 21	"Just the Way You Are"	Karlos Rosé	
July 28	"Me enamora"	Juanes	
August 4	"La diabla"	Romeo Santos	
August 11	"La diabla"	Romeo Santos	
August 18	"Bebé Bonita"	Chino & Nacho Featuring Jay Sean	
August 25	"Yo no soy un monstruo"	Elvis Crespo Featuring Ilegales	
September 1	"Dame la ola"	Tito el Bambino	
September 8	"No me compares"	Alejandro Sanz	
September 15	"No te dejaré de amar"	MAFFiO	
September 22	"Te quiero"	Ricardo Arjona	
September 29	"Tú eres perfecta"	Oscarcito	
October 6	"No me compares"	Alejandro Sanz	
October 13	"Volví a Nacer"	Carlos Vives	
October 20	"Ayántame"	Ilegales Featuring El Potro Álvarez	
October 27	Will U Still Love Me Tomorrow	Leslie Grace	
November 3	"Mi Vida Eres Tú"	N'Klabe	
November 10	"Echa Pa'lla (Manos Pa'rriba)"	Pitbull	
November 17	"Incondicional"	Prince Royce	
November 24	"Balada (Tchê Tcherere Tchê Tchê)"	Gusttavo Lima; Feat. Alex Sensation, Pitbull, Sensato & David Zonarosa Or Dyland & Lenny	
December 1	"Volví a nacer"	Carlos Vives	
December 8	"Pegaíto Suavecito"	Elvis Crespo Featuring Fito Blanko	
December 15	"¿Por Qué Les Mientes?"	Tito El Bambino + El Patrón Featuring Marc Anthony	
December 22	"Volví a nacer"	Carlos Vives	
December 29	"Volví a nacer"	Carlos Vives	

== See also ==
- List of number-one Billboard Tropical Songs of 2011
- List of number-one Billboard Tropical Songs of 2013
- List of number-one Billboard Top Latin Songs of 2012
- List of number-one Billboard Hot Latin Pop Airplay of 2012
