= List of number-one Billboard Tropical Songs of 2011 =

The Billboard Tropical Songs is a chart that ranks the best-performing tropical songs of the United States. Published by Billboard magazine, the data are compiled by Nielsen Broadcast Data Systems based on each single's weekly airplay.

== Chart history ==
Issue date	Song	Artist	Ref
January 1	"Danza Kuduro"	Don Omar & Lucenzo	
January 8	"Danza Kuduro"	Don Omar & Lucenzo	
January 15	"Danza Kuduro"	Don Omar & Lucenzo	
January 22	"Danza Kuduro"	Don Omar & Lucenzo	
January 29	"Danza Kuduro"	Don Omar & Lucenzo	
February 5	"Danza Kuduro"	Don Omar & Lucenzo	
February 12	"Danza Kuduro"	Don Omar & Lucenzo	
February 19	"Danza Kuduro"	Don Omar & Lucenzo	
February 26	"Danza Kuduro"	Don Omar & Lucenzo	
March 5	"Corazón sin cara"	Prince Royce	
March 12	"Corazón sin cara"	Prince Royce	
March 19	"Corazón sin cara"	Prince Royce	
March 26	"Corazón sin cara"	Prince Royce	
April 2	"Corazón sin cara"	Prince Royce	
April 9	"Llueve el Amor"	Tito El Bambino	
April 16	"Danza Kuduro"	Don Omar & Lucenzo	
April 23	"Corazón sin cara"	Prince Royce	
April 30	"Danza Kuduro"	Don Omar & Lucenzo	
May 7	"No Puedo Creer (I Can't Believe)"	24 Horas	
May 14	"Corazón sin cara"	Prince Royce	
May 21	"Corazón sin cara"	Prince Royce	
May 28	"You"	Romeo Santos	
June 4	"You"	Romeo Santos	
June 11	"Contestame El Telefono"	Alexis & Fido featuring Flex	
June 18	"You"	Romeo Santos	
June 25	"You"	Romeo Santos	
July 2	"You"	Romeo Santos	
July 9	"You"	Romeo Santos	
July 16	"You"	Romeo Santos	
July 23	"Taboo"	Don Omar	
July 30	"Solo Pienso En Ti"	Jerry Rivera	
August 6	"Solo Pienso En Ti"	Jerry Rivera	
August 13	"Solo Pienso En Ti"	Jerry Rivera	
August 20	"Solo Pienso En Ti"	Jerry Rivera	
August 27	"Amor Clandestino"	Maná	
September 3	"Taboo"	Don Omar	
September 10	"Bla Bla Bla"	El Potro Alvarez	
September 17	"Taboo"	Don Omar	
September 24	"Duele Duele"	24 Horas	
October 1	"Promise"	Romeo Santos featuring Usher	
October 8	"Tu Olor"	Wisin & Yandel	
October 15	"Rain Over Me"	Pitbull featuring Marc Anthony	
October 22	"El Amor"	Ricardo Arjona	
October 29	"Promise"	Romeo Santos featuring Usher	
November 5	"Promise"	Romeo Santos featuring Usher	
November 12	"El Amor"	Ricardo Arjona	
November 19	"Promise"	Romeo Santos featuring Usher	
November 26	"Promise"	Romeo Santos featuring Usher	
December 3	"Promise"	Romeo Santos featuring Usher	
December 10	"El Verdadero Amor Perdona"	Maná	
December 17	"El Verdadero Amor Perdona"	Maná	
December 24	"Promise"	Romeo Santos featuring Usher	
December 31	"Ayer"	Enrique Iglesias	

== See also ==
- List of number-one Billboard Top Latin Songs of 2011
- List of number-one Billboard Hot Latin Pop Airplay of 2011
