= Premios 40 Principales for Best Spanish Pop/Dance Act =

Former Spanish music award

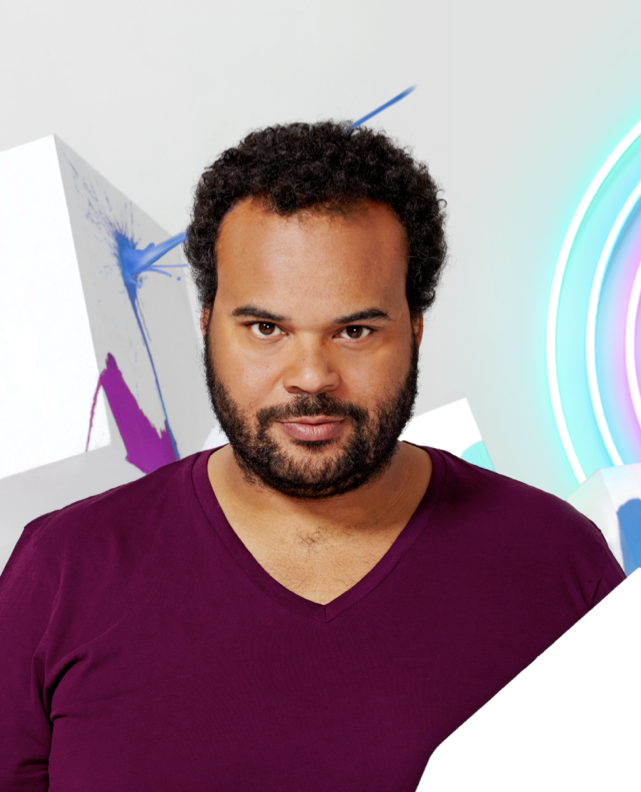
- Along with singer Electric Nana, DJ and producer Carlos Jean is the sole winner of this award
- Awarded for: Best in Spanish and International music
- Country: Spain
- Presented by: Los 40 Principales
- First award: 2011
- Final award: 2011

The Premio 40 Principales for Best Spanish Pop/Dance Act was an award presented as part of Los Premios 40 Principales. This category was only featured in the 2011 edition.

Year	Winner	Work	Other nominees
2011	Carlos Jean & Electric Nana	Lead the way	Enrique Iglesias, Ludacris & DJ Frank E - Tonight (I'm Lovin' You); Juan Magan, Pitbull & El Cata - Bailando Por El Mundo; Marta Sánchez & D-Mol - Get Together; Dani Moreno & Jackie Sagana - Domino
