= List of Billboard Hot Latin Songs and Latin Airplay number ones of 2012 =

The Billboard Top Latin Songs ranked the best-performing songs on Spanish-language radio stations and was published by Billboard magazine weekly. Since 1994, Nielsen BDS was used to measure the songs on the chart. On the week ending October 20, 2012, Billboard changed the methodology on the Hot Latin Songs to include digital downloads and streaming in addition to airplay from all radio stations in the United States, as opposed to just Spanish-language radio stations. Billboard also included imposed a linguistic rule in which only songs predominantly sung in Spanish are eligible to rank on the Hot Latin Songs chart. The Hot Latin Song's former methodology was formatted into the Latin Airplay chart.

== Chart history ==
=== Hot Latin Songs ===
Issue date	Song	Artist	Ref
January 7	"Promise"	Romeo Santos featuring Usher	
January 14	"Hotel Nacional"	Gloria Estefan	
January 21	"El Verdadero Amor Perdona"	Maná featuring Prince Royce	
January 28	"Promise"	Romeo Santos featuring Usher	
February 4	"El Verdadero Amor Perdona"	Maná featuring Prince Royce	
February 11	"Me Gustas Tanto"	Paulina Rubio	
February 18	"Si Tú Me Besas"	Víctor Manuelle	
February 25	"Lovumba"	Daddy Yankee	
March 3	"Mi Santa"	Romeo Santos featuring Tomatito	
March 10	"Inténtalo"	3Ball MTY featuring El Bebeto and América Sierra	
March 17	"Las Cosas Pequeñas"	Prince Royce	
March 24	"Inténtalo"	3Ball MTY featuring El Bebeto and América Sierra	
March 31	"Bailando Por El Mundo"	Juan Magan featuring Pitbull and El Cata	
April 7	"Dutty Love"	Don Omar featuring Natti Natasha	
April 14	"Ai Se Eu Te Pego!"	Michel Teló	
April 21	"Ai Se Eu Te Pego!"	Michel Teló	
April 28	"Ai Se Eu Te Pego!"	Michel Teló	
May 5	"La Señal"	Juanes	
May 12	"Ai Se Eu Te Pego!"	Michel Teló	
May 19	"Ai Se Eu Te Pego!"	Michel Teló	
May 26	"Ai Se Eu Te Pego!"	Michel Teló	
June 2	"Ai Se Eu Te Pego!"	Michel Teló	
June 9	"Ai Se Eu Te Pego!"	Michel Teló	
June 16	"Ai Se Eu Te Pego!"	Michel Teló	
June 23	"Ai Se Eu Te Pego!"	Michel Teló	
June 30	"Si Te Digo La Verdad"	Gocho	
July 7	"Follow the Leader"	Wisin & Yandel featuring Jennifer Lopez	
July 14	"Follow the Leader"	Wisin & Yandel featuring Jennifer Lopez	
July 21	"Hasta Que Salga el Sol"	Don Omar	
July 28	"Hasta Que Salga el Sol"	Don Omar	
August 4	"La Diabla"	Romeo Santos	
August 11	"Hasta Que Salga el Sol"	Don Omar	
August 18	"Bebe Bonita"	Chino & Nacho featuring Jay Sean	
August 25	"Yo No Soy Un Monstruo"	Elvis Crespo featuring Ilegales	
September 1	"Dame La Ola"	Tito El Bambino	
September 8	"No Me Compares"	Alejandro Sanz	
September 15	"Hasta Que Te Conocí"	Maná	
September 22	"Te Quiero"	Ricardo Arjona	
September 29	"Te Quiero"	Ricardo Arjona	
October 6	"No Me Compares"	Alejandro Sanz	
October 13	"Volví a Nacer"	Carlos Vives	
October 20	"Algo Me Gusta de Ti"	Wisin & Yandel featuring Chris Brown and T-Pain	
October 27	"Algo Me Gusta de Ti"	Wisin & Yandel featuring Chris Brown and T-Pain	
November 3	"Algo Me Gusta de Ti"	Wisin & Yandel featuring Chris Brown and T-Pain	
November 10	"Algo Me Gusta de Ti"	Wisin & Yandel featuring Chris Brown and T-Pain	
November 17	"Algo Me Gusta de Ti"	Wisin & Yandel featuring Chris Brown and T-Pain	
November 24	"Algo Me Gusta de Ti"	Wisin & Yandel featuring Chris Brown and T-Pain	
December 1	"Algo Me Gusta de Ti"	Wisin & Yandel featuring Chris Brown and T-Pain	
December 8	"Algo Me Gusta de Ti"	Wisin & Yandel featuring Chris Brown and T-Pain	
December 15	"Algo Me Gusta de Ti"	Wisin & Yandel featuring Chris Brown and T-Pain	
December 22	"Algo Me Gusta de Ti"	Wisin & Yandel featuring Chris Brown and T-Pain	
December 29	"Algo Me Gusta de Ti"	Wisin & Yandel featuring Chris Brown and T-Pain	

=== Latin Airplay ===
Issue date	Song	Artist	Ref
October 20	"Algo Me Gusta de Ti"	Wisin & Yandel featuring Chris Brown and T-Pain	
October 27	"Will U Still Love Me Tomorrow"	Leslie Grace	
November 3	"Diosa de los Corazónes"	Arcángel, Zion & Lennox, Lobo, RKM & Ken-Y	
November 10	"Solo Viné a Despedirme"	Gerardo Ortíz	
November 17	"Incondicional"	Prince Royce	
November 24	"Balada (Tchê Tcherere Tchê Tchê)"	Gusttavo Lima	
December 1	"Finally Found You"	Enrique Iglesias featuring Sammy Adams	
December 8	"Solo Viné a Despedirme"	Gerardo Ortíz	
December 15	"Volví a Nacer"	Carlos Vives	
December 22	"Volví a Nacer"	Carlos Vives	
December 29	"Amor Real"	Gocho featuring Yandel and Wayne Wonder	
