= The King Stays King =

2012–13 concert tour by Romeo Santos

- World tour by Romeo Santos
- Location: United States; Latin America; Spain
- Associated album: Formula, Vol. 1
- Start date: February 11, 2012
- End date: July 20, 2013
- Legs: 2
- No. of shows: 75

Romeo Santos concert chronology
- The King Stays King (2012–13); Vol. 2 Tour (2014–16)

The King Stays King (also known as Formula, Vol. 1 Tour) was a worldwide concert tour by American singer Romeo Santos. The tour was a promotion for his debut solo album, Formula, Vol. 1. On December 13, 2011, Santos announced that he would begin his initial leg of his solo tour on February 11, 2012, in the United States and ended on July 20, 2013, in Lima, Peru.

== Madison Square Garden ==
His first concert began with three consecutive shows at Madison Square Garden which all three became sold-out. During the concert at Madison Square Garden, Santos was accompanied by fellow bachata singer Prince Royce. For "Debate de 4", he had bachata musicians Luis Vargas and Antony Santos for one of the nights while the other nights had three men from the audience who were randomly selected to join Romeo Santos on the stage to sing the song. Raulín Rodríguez is also featured in the song but was not in any of the concerts. Usher made an appearance on the encore for the song "Promise" in which he is featured in. At the final concert in the Madison Square Garden, Santos was joined by American rapper P. Diddy for the song "Mi Corazoncito". The concerts at Madison Square Garden were recorded and later released as a live album and film titled The King Stays King: Sold Out at Madison Square Garden on November 6, 2012.

== The US tour ==
Following the concerts at Madison Square Garden, Santos continued his tour in Florida where he performed at the American Airlines Arena in Miami on March 1, 2012, and at the Amway Center in Orlando the following day. In the same month, he continued his US tour in Georgia, Massachusetts, Virginia, Illinois, Texas, California, and Arizona, and ended on March 25 in Las Vegas, Nevada. He also announced that the tour would be extended to Latin American countries.

== The world tour ==
Santos began his world tour on May 31, 2012, in Venezuela where he performed in seven cities in the country: Caracas, Valencia, Barquisimeto, San Cristóbal, Mérida, Maracaibo, and Puerto La Cruz. Following his performances in Venezuela, Santos performed at the Movistar Arena in Santiago, Chile, on June 23, 2012, which drew 16,000 attendees. Santos continued to tour in South America where he performed two concerts in Ecuador, Peru, Paraguay where nearly 10,000 people attended the concert, and four concerts in Argentina. The concert at Luna Park in Buenos Aires, Argentina, drew 25,000 people completely filling the capacity at the concert.

In October 2012, Santos performed two concerts in Spain at Madrid and at Barcelona. After his performances in Spain, the tour continued on to Central America where he performed in Honduras, El Salvador, and Guatemala. On October 26, 2012, Santos performed in Cali, Colombia, which was originally supposed to be shared with Puerto Rican reggaeton singer Don Omar. However, Omar could not attend due to breaches with his contract with Al Eventos, the company responsible for managing the event.

On December 15 and 22, 2012 Santos performed at the Estadio Olímpico in Santo Domingo, Dominican Republic, where 50,000 people attended the concert.

== Second leg of the tour ==
The day before the concert in the Dominican Republic, Santos announced that he would start the second leg of the tour, which began on February 14, 2013, at the José Miguel Agrelot Coliseum in San Juan, Puerto Rico. He perform two nights in a row the Coliseum. Two weeks later, Santos performed at the Movistar Arena in Chile. The second tour leg continued throughout the United States from March 22, 2013, in Newark, New Jersey, until April 26, 2013, in Hollywood, California. His last concerts of the tour in Latin America included shows six in cities in Mexico, one show in Panama and one in Lima, Peru which would officially end the tour on July 20, 2013.

== Tour dates ==
Date	City	Country	Venue
Leg 1
North America
February 11, 2012	New York City	United States	Madison Square Garden
February 23, 2012	New York City	United States	Madison Square Garden
February 24, 2012	New York City	United States	Madison Square Garden
March 1, 2012	Miami	United States	American Airlines Arena
March 2, 2012	Orlando	United States	Amway Center
March 4, 2012	Atlanta	United States	Philips Arena
March 7, 2012	Boston	United States	Agganis Arena
March 9, 2012	Fairfax	United States	Patriot Center
March 13, 2012	Rosemont	United States	Allstate Arena
March 15, 2012	Houston	United States	Toyota Center
March 16, 2012	Grand Prairie	United States	Verizon Theatre at Grand Prairie
March 20, 2012	San Jose	United States	HP Pavilion
March 21, 2012	Los Angeles	United States	Staples Center
March 23, 2012	Glendale	United States	Jobing.com Arena
March 24, 2012	San Diego	United States	Valley View Casino Center
March 25, 2012	Las Vegas	United States	The Joint
April 26, 2012	Atlantic City	United States	Trump Taj Mahal
South America
May 31, 2012	Caracas	Venezuela	Terraza del C.C.C.T.
June 1, 2012	Caracas	Venezuela	Terraza del C.C.C.T.
June 2, 2012	Valencía	Venezuela	Forum de Valencia
June 3, 2012	Barquisimeto	Venezuela	Complejo Ferial Bicentenario
June 8, 2012	Maracaibo	Venezuela	Palacio de Eventos
June 9, 2012	San Cristóbal	Venezuela	Plaza de Toros
June 12, 2012	Puerto Ordaz	Venezuela	Polideportivo Cachamay
June 13, 2012	Puerto La Cruz	Venezuela	Estadio José Antonio Anzoátegui
June 15, 2012	Curazao	Venezuela	Kleine Werf
June 19, 2012	Buenos Aires	Argentina	Luna Park
June 20, 2012	Buenos Aires	Argentina	Luna Park
June 22, 2012	Coquimbo	Chile	Estadio Municipal Francisco Sánchez Rumoroso
June 23, 2012	Santiago	Chile	Arena Movistar
July 25, 2012	Lima	Peru	Estadio Monumental "U"
July 27, 2012	Guayaquil	Ecuador	Teatro Feria de Durán
July 28, 2012	Quito	Ecuador	Coliseo General Rumiñahui
August 1, 2012	Asunción	Paraguay	Jockey Club
August 3, 2012	Buenos Aires	Argentina	Luna Park
August 4, 2012	Buenos Aires	Argentina	Luna Park
August 7, 2012	Rosario	Argentina	Teatro Broadway
Europe
August 12, 2012	Amsterdam	Netherlands	Heineken Music Hall
South America
October 4, 2012	Bogotá	Colombia	Jaime Duque Park
October 5, 2012	Manizales	Colombia	Estadio Palogrande
October 6, 2012	Medellín	Colombia	Estadio Atanasio Girardot
Europe
October 11, 2012	Madrid	Spain	Palacio Vistalegre
October 12, 2012	Barcelona	Spain	Badalona Arena
North America
October 17, 2012	Tegucigalpa	Honduras	Coliseo Nacional de Ingenieros
October 19, 2012	San Salvador	El Salvador	Estadio Jorge "Mágico" González
October 20, 2012	Guatemala City	Guatemala	Mundo E
December 15, 2012	Santo Domingo	Dominican Republic	Estadio Olímpico Félix Sánchez
December 22, 2012	Santo Domingo	Dominican Republic	Estadio Olímpico Félix Sánchez
Leg 2
North America
February 14, 2013	San Juan	Puerto Rico	José Miguel Agrelot Coliseum
February 15, 2013	San Juan	Puerto Rico	José Miguel Agrelot Coliseum
South America
February 26, 2013	Santiago	Chile	Movistar Arena
March 2, 2013	Buenos Aires	Argentina	Estadio G.E.B.A.
North America
March 22, 2013	Newark	United States	Prudential Center
March 24, 2013	Boston	United States	Agganis Arena
March 27, 2013	Hollywood	United States	Hard Rock Live
March 28, 2013	Orlando	United States	Amway Center
March 30, 2013	Fairfax	United States	Patriot Center
April 4, 2013	San Antonio	United States	AT&T Center
April 5, 2013	Grand Prairie	United States	Verizon Theatre at Grand Prairie
April 6, 2013	Houston	United States	Toyota Center
April 7, 2013	Hidalgo	United States	State Farm Arena
April 9, 2013	El Paso	United States	El Paso County Coliseum
April 10, 2013	Phoenix	United States	Comerica Theatre
April 12, 2013	Anaheim	United States	Honda Center
April 13, 2013	Fresno	United States	Save Mart Center
April 14, 2013	Las Vegas	United States	The Joint
April 18, 2013	Rosemont	United States	Allstate Arena
April 20, 2013	Duluth	United States	Arena at Gwinnett Center
April 26, 2013	Atlantic City	United States	Trump Taj Mahal
April 28, 2013	Uniondale	United States	Nassau Veterans Memorial Coliseum
May 5, 2013	Hollywood	United States	Hard Rock Live
June 21, 2013	Acapulco	Mexico	Forum de Mundo Imperial
June 22, 2013	Chapultepec	Mexico	National Auditorium
June 23, 2013	Zapopan	Mexico	Telmex Auditorium
June 26, 2013	Chapultepec	Mexico	National Auditorium
June 28, 2013	Tijuana	Mexico	Plaza de Toros Monumental
June 30, 2013	Merida	Mexico	Centro de Espectáculos Jardín Carta Clara
July 18, 2013	Panama City	Panama	Estadio Nacional
South America
July 20, 2013	Lima	Peru	Estadio de San Marcos
