= La Diabla =

La Diabla ("she-devil") may refer to:

- "La Diabla" (Romeo Santos song), 2012
- "La Diabla" (Xavi song), 2023
- "La Diabla", a song by Eslabon Armado from the album Tu Veneno Mortal, Vol. 2, 2021
