= Vol. 2 Tour =

2014–16 concert tour by Romeo Santos

- Tour by Romeo Santos
- Associated album: Formula, Vol. 2
- Start date: March 7, 2014
- End date: August 27, 2016
- Legs: 3
- No. of shows: 53 in North America; 41 in Latin America; 18 in Europe; 112 in total

Romeo Santos concert chronology
- The King Stays King (2012–13); Vol. 2 Tour (2014–16); Golden Tour (2018–19)

Vol. 2 Tour was a concert tour by the Domininican American singer Romeo Santos, to promote his album Formula, Vol. 2. This concert tour was a commercial success, selling out arenas and stadiums all over America and Europe, including Yankee Stadium in New York.

== Tour dates ==
Date	City	Country	Venue
North America
March 7, 2014	Monterrey	Mexico	Arena Monterrey
March 8, 2014	Mexico City	Mexico	Mexico City Arena
March 9, 2014	Mexico City	Mexico	Mexico City Arena
Europe
March 18, 2014	Olivia	Spain	Recinto Ferial De Corralejo
March 21, 2014	Madrid	Spain	Plaza de Toros de Las Ventas
March 22, 2014	Bacerlona	Spain	Palau Sant Jordi
March 23, 2014	Paris	France	Zenith de Paris
March 26, 2014	Milan	Italy	Mediolanum Forum
March 27, 2014	Rome	Italy	Palalottomatica
March 30, 2014	London	United Kingdown	O2 Academy Brixton
South America
April 5, 2014	Buenos Aires	Argentina	Estadio GEBA
April 29, 2014	Santiago	Chile	Movistar Arena
May 3, 2014	Buenos Aires	Argentina	Estadio GEBA
May 4, 2014	Buenos Aires	Argentina	Estadio GEBA
May 9, 2014	Buenos Aires	Argentina	Estadio GEBA
May 10, 2014	Buenos Aires	Argentina	Estadio GEBA
May 11, 2014	Buenos Aires	Argentina	Estadio GEBA
North America
May 21, 2014	San Diego	United States	Valley View Casino Center
May 22, 2014	Los Angeles	United States	Staples Center
May 23, 2014	Oakland	United States	Oracle Arena
May 25, 2014	Las Vegas	United States	Mandalay Bay Events Center
May 29, 2014	Duluth	United States	Infinite Energy Arena
May 30, 2014	Orlando	United States	Anway Center
May 31, 2014	Miami	United States	American Airlines Arena
June 4, 2014	Houston	United States	Toyota Center
June 5, 2014	Houston	United States	Toyota Center
June 6, 2014	San Antonio	United States	AT&T Center
June 7, 2014	Dallas	United States	American Airlines Center
June 11, 2014	Fairfax	United States	EagleBank Arena
June 13, 2014	Rosemont	United States	Allstate Arena
June 15, 2014	Philadelphia	United States	Liacouras Center
June 20, 2014	Boston	United States	Agganis Arena
June 21, 2014	Boston	United States	Agganis Arena
June 22, 2014	Boston	United States	Agganis Arena
June 26, 2014	Los Angeles	United States	Staples Center
June 28, 2014	Fresno	United States	Selland Arena
June 29, 2014	San Jose	United States	SAP Center at San Jose
July 11, 2014	New York	United States	Yankee Stadium
July 12, 2014	New York	United States	Yankee Stadium
Latin America
December 14, 2014	Santiago de los Caballeros	Dominican Republic	Estadio Cibao
December 20, 2014	Santo Domingo	Dominican Republic	Estadio Olímpico Felix Sanchez
February 6, 2015	Zapopan	Mexico	Estadio Beisbol Charros
February 14, 2015	Mexico City	Mexico	Foro Sol
February 26, 2015	Viña del Mar	Chile	Festival Viña del Mar 2015
February 28, 2015	Buenos Aires	Argentina	River Plate Stadium
March 1, 2015	Buenos Aires	Argentina	River Plate Stadium
March 13, 2015	Cordoba	Argentina	Estadio Mario Alberto Kempes
Europe
March 20, 2015	Toledo	Spain	Toledo Plaza De Toros
March 21, 2015	Stockholm	Sweden	Hovet
March 25, 2015	Granada	Spain	Palacio de Deportes de Granada
March 26, 2015	Malaga	Spain	Auditorio Municipal
March 27, 2015	Malaga	Spain	Auditorio Municipal
March 31, 2015	Dietikon	Switzerland	Stadthalle Dietikon
April 1, 2015	Santiago de Compostela	Spain	Multiusos Fontes do Sar
April 2, 2015	Elche	Spain	Institucion Ferial Alicantina (IFA)
April 9, 2015	Seville	Spain	Palacio Municipal de Deportes San Pablo
April 10, 2015	Barakaldo	Spain	Bilbao Exhibition Center (BEC)
April 11, 2015	Rotterdam	Netherlands	Ahoy
Latin America
April 16, 2015	Santa Cruz de la Sierra	Bolivia	Estadio Ramon Tahuichi Aguilera
April 18, 2015	La Paz	Bolivia	Estadio Hernando Siles
April 20, 2015	Montevideo	Uruguay	Gran Parque Central
April 23, 2015	Lima	Peru	Estadio Nacional
April 24, 2015	San Salvador	El Salvador	Estadio Jorge Magico Gonzalez
April 25, 2015	Tegucipalga	Honduras	Estadio Chochi Sosa
North America II
May 21, 2015	Sacramento	United States	Sleep Train Arena
May 23, 2015	Anaheim	United States	Honda Center
May 24, 2015	Las Vegas	United States	Zappos Theater at Planted Hollywood
May 28, 2015	Phoenix	United States	Comerica Theatre
May 29, 2015	El Paso	United States	El Paso County Coliseum
May 30, 2015	San Antonio	United States	Freeman Coliseum
May 31, 2015	Laredo	United States	Laredo Energy Arena
June 3, 2015	Houston	United States	Toyota Center
June 5, 2015	Dallas	United States	American Airlines Center
June 6, 2015	Hidalgo	United States	Hidalgo State Farm Arena
June 10, 2015	Toronto	Canada	Budweiser Stage
June 12, 2015	Rosemont	United States	Allstate Arena
June 13, 2015	Kansas City	United States	Sprint Center
June 14, 2015	Denver	United States	Pepsi Center
June 18, 2015	Duluth	United States	Infinite Energy Arena
June 19, 2015	Tampa	United States	Amalie Arena
June 20, 2015	Miami	United States	American Airlines Arena
June 21, 2015	Miami	United States	American Airlines Arena
June 25, 2015	Farifax	United States	EagleBank Arena
June 26, 2015	Atlantic City	United States	Boardwalk Hall
June 27, 2015	Mashantucket	United States	Grand Theater at Foxwoods
June 28, 2015	Mashantucket	United States	Grand Theater at Foxwoods
July 10, 2015	Brooklyn	United States	Barclays Center
July 11, 2015	Brooklyn	United States	Barclays Center
July 12, 2015	Brooklyn	United States	Barclays Center
Latin America
November 8, 2015	La Plata	Argentina	Estadio Ciudad de La Plata
November 10, 2015	Neuquen	Argentina	Casino Magic
November 12, 2015	Valparaiso	Chile	Estadio Elias Figueroa
November 14, 2015	Coquimbo	Chile	Estadio Municipal Francisco Sanchez Rumoroso
November 15, 2015	Antofagasta	Chile	Estadio Regional Calvo y Bascuñan
November 20, 2015	Quito	Ecuador	Estadio Olimpico Atahualpa
November 21, 2015	Portoviejo	Ecuador	Estadio Reales Tamarindo
November 27, 2015	Guayaquil	Ecuador	Estadio Modelo Alberto Spencer Herrera
November 28, 2015	Cuenca	Ecuador	Estadio Alejandra Serrano Aguilar
December 2, 2015	Panama City	Panama	Figali Convention Center
December 5, 2015	San Pedro Sula	Honduras	Estadio Francisco Morazan
December 7, 2015	Lima	Peru	Estadio Nacional
December 12, 2015	Guatemala City	Guatemala	Estadio Cementos Progreso
December 13, 2015	San Jose	Costa Rica	Estadio Nacional
March 10, 2016	San Juan	Puerto Rico	Coliseo de Puerto Rico Jose Miguel Agrelot
March 11, 2016	San Juan	Puerto Rico	Coliseo de Puerto Rico Jose Miguel Agrelot
March 12, 2016	San Juan	Puerto Rico	Coliseo de Puerto Rico Jose Miguel Agrelot
August 13, 2016	Palmira	Colombia	Estadio Francisco Rivera Escobar
August 18, 2016	Pasto	Colombia	Estadio Departamental Libertad
August 19, 2016	Ibague	Colombia	Centro de Eventos
August 20, 2016	Manizales	Colombia	Estadio Palogrande
August 27, 2016	Punta Cana	Dominican Republic	Hard Rock Hotel & Casino

=== Box Office Data ===
City	Country	Attendance	Box office
Los Angeles	United States	14,346 / 14,346 (100%)	$1,583,460
San Diego	United States	5,350 / 5,876 (91%)	$273,215
Los Angeles	United States	12,392 / 12,392 (100%)	$780,806
Fresno	United States	3,122 / 5,719 (55%)	$144,708
Fairfax	United States	6,388 / 7,145 (89%)	$587,120
Duluth	United States	4,916 / 6,348 (77%)	$422,227
Dallas	United States	9,506 / 11,882 (80%)	$781,149
Mexico City	Mexico	48,298 / 48,298 (100%)	$2,766,109
Houston	United States	11,311 / 11,832 (96%)	$1,035,575
Laredo	United States	3,997 / 5,444 (73%)	$350,742
Rosemont	United States	13,327 / 13,327 (100%)	$1,012,690
Denver	United States	8,778 / 8,778 (100%)	$730,080
Kansas City	United States	5,584 / 6,954 (80%)	$444,960
Atlantic City	United States	8,610 / 9,057 (95%)	$865,660
Sacramento	United States	6,811 / 7,583 (90%)	$483,683
Fairfax	United States	6,001 / 7,370 (81%)	$633,788
Brooklyn	United States	45,285 / 45,285 (100%)	$3,756,352
Tampa	United States	11,844 / 11,844 (100%)	$787,139
Dallas	United States	10,595 / 11,743 (90%)	$874,507
San Juan	Puerto Rico	36,526 / 39,935 (91%)	$2,527,506
Totals		250,548 / 267,571 (94%)	$19,667,476
