= Debate de 4 =

2011 song

Promotional single by Romeo Santos featuring Luis Vargas, Raulín Rodríguez and Anthony Santos

from the album Formula, Vol. 1
- Released: November 8, 2011 (album release)
- Recorded: 2011
- Genre: Bachata
- Length: 4:39
- Label: Sony Latin
- Songwriter: Anthony "Romeo" Santos

"Debate de 4" (English: "Debate of 4") is a song by American singer Romeo Santos, featuring Dominican bachata singers Luis Vargas, Raulín Rodríguez and Anthony Santos. It is from his first studio album Formula, Vol. 1 (2011).

== Background ==
This was considered a historic collaboration for its time as Romeo united 3 musicians who are considered the 3 greatest in the bachata genre. Even though at this time Luis Vargas, Raulín Rodríguez and Anthony Santos had personal issues since the mid to late 90s, they were still willing to collaborate with each other for the song. Romeo in an interview explained that when he had the idea to unite the three of them for this song, he wasn't sure if Anthony would want to be part of the song based on the circumstances. To Romeo's surprised, Anthony agreed because he felt like he couldn't say no to Romeo and knew how important it was to make this song.

== Composition ==
"Debate de 4" is mostly a traditional bachata song. The song incorporated the styles of the featured artist and sample a few of their greatest hit songs. From Vargas, it sampled the song "Traición De Hombre Y Mujer" from his debut album El Debate: Merengues De Verdad released in 1983, which was used to start off the song. The song's title might come from the title of the album. It also sampled Vargas' hit song "Loco De Amor (Con Los Crespos Echos)" from his 1994 album which had the same name. From Rodríguez, it sampled the song "Nereyda" which was also a 1994 smash hit and it came from his second studio album Regresa Amor which was released the in same year. From Anthony, it sampled the song " Donde Estará" from his third album Corazón Bonito released in 1993.

== Live performances ==
In February of 2012, Romeo featured Luis and Anthony Santos in his three-night sold-out concerts at Madison Square Garden in New York City to perform the song. Unfortunately Raulín wasn't able to be part of the event for personal reasons. The performance was featured in Romeo's first live solo album and concert film The King Stays King: Sold Out at Madison Square Garden.

In December of 2012, Romeo would feature all three of them at the sold-out two-night show at the Félix Sánchez Olympic Stadium in Santo Domingo, Dominican Republic, to perform the song live. This was the last time they performed together live.

== Chart performance ==
Chart (2011)	Peak position
US Hot Latin Songs (Billboard)	23
US Latin Airplay (Billboard)	45
US Tropical Airplay (Billboard)	26

== Certifications ==
Region	Certification	Certified units/sales
Mexico (AMPROFON)	Platinum+Gold	90,000^{‡}
^{‡} Sales+streaming figures based on certification alone.
