= List of number-one Billboard Top Latin Songs of 2011 =

The Billboard Top Latin Songs chart ranks the best-performing Spanish-language singles in the United States. Published by Billboard magazine, the data are compiled by Nielsen SoundScan based collectively on each single's weekly physical and digital sales, and airplay.

== Chart history ==
Issue date	Song	Artist	Ref
January 1	"Danza Kuduro"	Don Omar & Lucenzo	
January 8	"Danza Kuduro"	Don Omar & Lucenzo	
January 15	"Danza Kuduro"	Don Omar & Lucenzo	
January 22	"Danza Kuduro"	Don Omar & Lucenzo	
January 29	"Danza Kuduro"	Don Omar & Lucenzo	
February 5	"Danza Kuduro"	Don Omar & Lucenzo	
February 12	"Lo Mejor De Mi Vida Eres Tú"	Ricky Martin featuring Natalia Jiménez	
February 19	"Lo Mejor De Mi Vida Eres Tú"	Ricky Martin featuring Natalia Jiménez	
February 26	"Danza Kuduro"	Don Omar & Lucenzo	
March 5	"Danza Kuduro"	Don Omar & Lucenzo	
March 12	"Corazón Sin Cara"	Prince Royce	
March 19	"No Me Digas Que No"	Enrique Iglesias featuring Wisin & Yandel	
March 26	"Corazón Sin Cara"	Prince Royce	
April 2	"Lluvia al Corazón"	Maná	
April 9	"Lluvia al Corazón"	Maná	
April 16	"Lluvia al Corazón"	Maná	
April 23	"Lluvia al Corazón"	Maná	
April 30	"Lluvia al Corazón"	Maná	
May 7	"Lluvia al Corazón"	Maná	
May 14	"Lluvia al Corazón"	Maná	
May 21	"Lluvia al Corazón"	Maná	
May 28	"You"	Romeo Santos	
June 4	"You"	Romeo Santos	
June 11	"You"	Romeo Santos	
June 18	"You"	Romeo Santos	
June 25	"You"	Romeo Santos	
July 2	"You"	Romeo Santos	
July 9	"You"	Romeo Santos	
July 16	"Taboo"	Don Omar	
July 23	"Taboo"	Don Omar	
July 30	"Give Me Everything"	Pitbull featuring Ne-Yo, Afrojack and Nayer	
August 6	"Give Me Everything"	Pitbull featuring Ne-Yo, Afrojack and Nayer	
August 13	"Taboo"	Don Omar	
August 20	"Give Me Everything"	Pitbull featuring Ne-Yo, Afrojack and Nayer	
August 27	"Amor Clandestino"	Maná	
September 3	"Taboo"	Don Omar	
September 10	"Give Me Everything"	Pitbull featuring Ne-Yo, Afrojack and Nayer	
September 17	"Give Me Everything"	Pitbull featuring Ne-Yo, Afrojack and Nayer	
September 24	"Give Me Everything"	Pitbull featuring Ne-Yo, Afrojack and Nayer	
October 1	"Taboo"	Don Omar	
October 8	"Tu Olor"	Wisin & Yandel	
October 15	"Rain Over Me"	Pitbull featuring Marc Anthony	
October 22	"El Amor"	Ricardo Arjona	
October 29	"Promise"	Romeo Santos featuring Usher	
November 5	"Promise"	Romeo Santos featuring Usher	
November 12	"Promise"	Romeo Santos featuring Usher	
November 19	"Promise"	Romeo Santos featuring Usher	
November 26	"Promise"	Romeo Santos featuring Usher	
December 3	"Promise"	Romeo Santos featuring Usher	
December 10	"El Verdadero Amor Perdona"	Maná featuring Prince Royce	
December 17	"El Verdadero Amor Perdona"	Maná featuring Prince Royce	
December 24	"Promise"	Romeo Santos featuring Usher	
December 31	"Promise"	Romeo Santos featuring Usher	
