= Formula, Vol. 1 =

2011 studio album by Romeo Santos

Fórmula, Vol. 1

Studio album by Romeo Santos
- Released: November 8, 2011
- Recorded: 2011
- Studios: The Castle, Fight Klub, and EMG Studios in New York City
- Genres: Bachata; Latin pop; R&B
- Length: 54:40
- Languages: Spanish; English
- Label: Sony Latin
- Producers: Romeo Santos; Ivan Chevere (co-producer)

Romeo Santos chronology
Fórmula, Vol. 1 (2011)	The King Stays King: Sold Out at Madison Square Garden (2012)

Singles from Fórmula, Vol. 1
- 1. "You" Released: May 10, 2011; 2. "Promise" Released: September 1, 2011; 3. "Mi Santa" Released: January 24, 2012; 4. "All Aboard" Released: March 8, 2012; 5. "Rival" Released: March 22, 2012; 6. "La Diabla" Released: April 25, 2012

Fórmula, Vol. 1 is the debut studio album by American singer Romeo Santos, released on November 8, 2011, by Sony Music Latin. It is Santos's first album as a solo artist following the break-up of American bachata group Aventura, of which he was the lead singer. The record contains fifteen tracks, most of which were composed by Santos and co-produced with Ivan Chevere. The album experiments with the sound of bachata and other genres including R&B and flamenco. It features several Anglophone and Hispanophone guest artists including Usher, Tomatito, Mario Domm, and Lil Wayne. Recording for the album took place in 2011 at The Castle, Fight Klub, and EMG Studios in New York City. A deluxe edition of the album containing five extra tracks was released exclusively in Walmart retail stores in the United States.

In the U.S., Formula, Vol. 1 peaked at number one on the Billboard Top Latin Albums and Billboard Tropical Albums charts and was the best-selling Latin album of 2012. It was certified three times platinum (Latin field) by the Recording Industry Association of America (RIAA) for shipping 300,000 copies and had sold 328,000 copies in the U.S. by February 2014. It ranked number thirteen, twenty-six, and seventy-seven on the Argentine, Mexican, and Spanish album charts respectively.

Santos promoted the record by touring the U.S., Latin America and Europe. It was generally well received by critics, who praised the production of the bachata tracks although some of the duets—including those with Mario Domm and Mala Rodríguez—were criticized as obvious attempts to appeal outside of the bachata audience. The album earned Santos several accolades, including a Grammy Award nomination, three Billboard Latin Music Awards, a Billboard Music Award, a Lo Nuestro nomination, a Premios Juventud award, and a Soberano Award. Six singles were released from the record, four of which, "You", "Promise", "Mi Santa", and "La Diabla", reached number one on the Billboard Hot Latin Songs chart in the U.S.

== Background ==
Romeo Santos began his career as the lead member of Aventura, an urban bachata infused band. The band rose to popularity in the 2000s, sold over 1.7 million albums in the U.S., and had the best-selling Latin album of 2009, The Last. Soon after the group's separation in early 2011, Santos signed a record deal with Sony Music Latin and Jive Records to record his debut solo album, Formula, Vol. 1. According to his manager Johnny Marines, the contract was worth US$10,000,000. Santos felt that the record was a continuation of his career rather than a new beginning.

== Composition ==
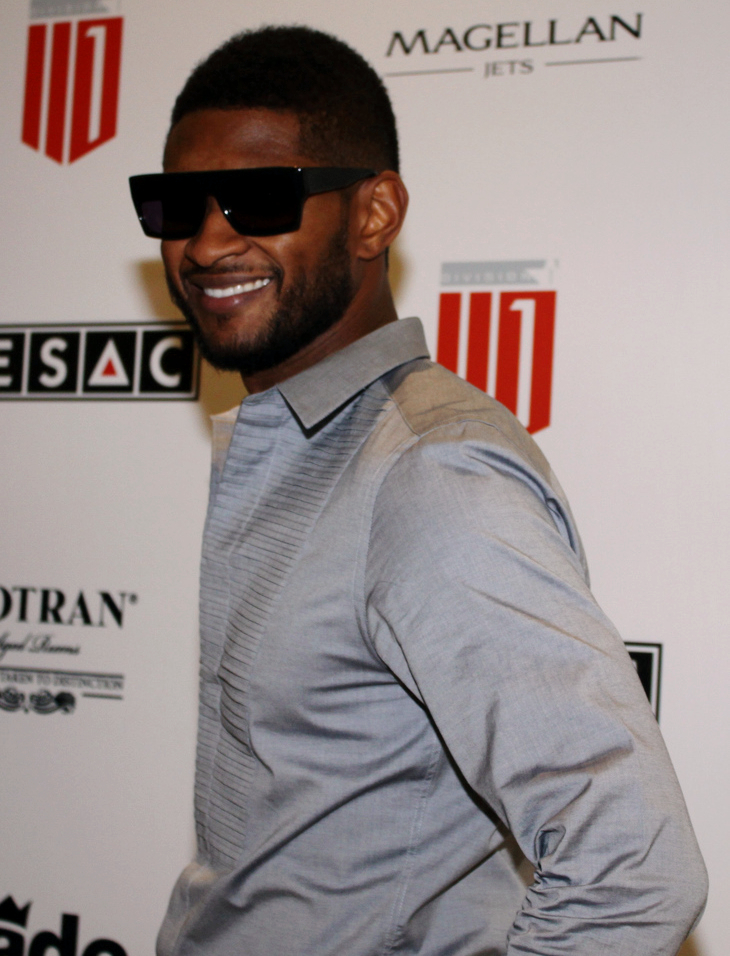
American singer Usher (left) performed "Promise", a bilingual bachata song where Usher performs in English and Santos in Spanish.

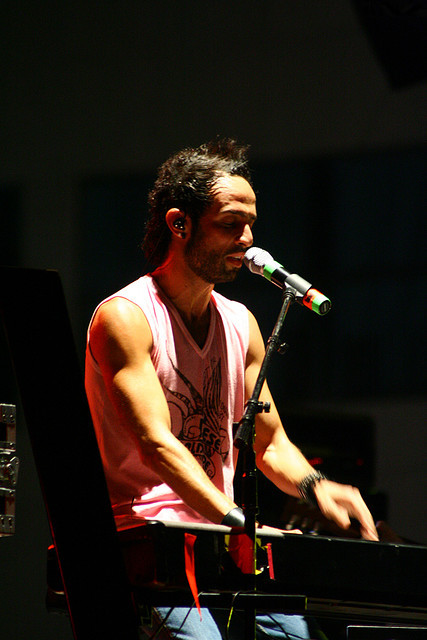
Mexican singer Mario Domm (right) performed with Santos, "Rival", a pop ballad song.

Formula, Vol. 1 contains fifteen tracks, most of which were written by Romeo Santos and co-produced by Ivan Chevere. Santos said he intended to write more English-language recordings on the album but did not want to stray far from his musical origins. The songs were recorded at The Castle, Fight Klub, and EMG Studios in New York City.

The album begins with a skit featuring American comedian George Lopez, in which Santos confesses his "sins" about his fortune and fame to a priest played by Lopez. The first song "La Diabla" ("She-Devil") is a bachata track about a man who regrets making a deal with a she-devil after losing the game of love. The third song, "Que Se Mueran" ("Let Them Die"), attacks the public for their criticism of the age difference between lovers. "Mi Santa" ("My Saint") incorporates elements of bachata and flamenco, and features Spanish guitarist Tomatito.

"Promise" is a bilingual bachata tune that features American singer Usher and was produced by Rico Love. Santos said the collaboration was his idea, and that Usher enjoyed the duet despite not speaking Spanish. "Debate de 4" ("Battle of 4") features Dominican bachata musicians Antony Santos, Raulín Rodríguez, and Luis Vargas, who also feature in a skit preceding the track. "You" is a bilingual bachata record and was the first composition written for the album.

"Magia Negra" ("Black Magic") is a mixture of bachata and hip hop music, and features Spanish rapper Mala Rodríguez. "Rival" is a ballad duet with Mario Domm, the lead singer of Mexican band Camila. It was recorded at Ocean Way Recording in Los Angeles. "All Aboard" is a hip hop track, featuring American rapper Lil Wayne and produced by Rico Love. Santos said he approached Wayne after writing the song.

== Singles ==
Romeo Santos "You" (2011)
A 24-second sample of "You", by Romeo Santos. The song mixes bachata and R&B with Santos performing part of the chorus in Spanish and English. "You" was the first song to composed for the album.

Romeo Santos "Promise" (2011)
A 24-second sample of "Promise", the second single released from the album. The first half of the sample features Santos performing the song in R&B in Spanish with the second half of the sample features Usher performing the song in bachata.

"You", the first single from the album, was released on May 9, 2011. In the US, the song peaked at number ninety-seven on the Billboard Hot 100 and debuted at number one on the Billboard Hot Latin Songs. Santos is the eighth overall artist whose single has debuted at number one on the Hot Latin Songs chart. It also reached number one on the Billboard Tropical Songs charts. "You" was the eighth best-performing Latin single of 2011.

The album's second single, "Promise" was released on September 2, 2011. The song peaked at number eighty-three on the Billboard Hot 100, became his second number one single on the Hot Latin Songs and Tropical Songs charts, and peaked at number one on the Billboard Latin Pop Songs chart. "Promise" received airplay in Mexico, where it ranked at number twenty on the Monitor Latino charts.

"Mi Santa", the album's third single, was released on January 24, 2012. It peaked at number one on the Hot Latin Songs, Latin Pop Songs, and Tropical Songs charts.

The fourth single, "All Aboard", was released on March 8, 2012, and peaked at number eight on the Latin Digital Songs chart.

The fifth single, "Rival", was released on March 19, 2012, peaking at number forty-two on the Hot Latin Songs and number twenty-two on the Latin Pop Songs charts. In Mexico, "Rival" reached number fifteen on the Monitor Latino charts.

The sixth single, "La Diabla", became the fourth single from the album to reach number one on the Hot Latin Songs chart; making it the second-most number one singles from an album. Only Spanish singer Enrique Iglesias has had more number one hits from a single album. "La Diabla" also peaked at number two on the Latin Pop Songs and number one on the Tropical Songs chart.

"Llévame Contigo" is not a single for this album. However, its live version was used as a single for Santos' first solo live album, The King Stays King: Sold Out at Madison Square Garden. It peaked at number 2 on Billboard Hot Latin Songs cart and at number 1 on the Billboard Latin and Tropical Airplay charts.

== Promotion ==
To promote the album, Santos launched a 75-show The King Stays King tour, which started in New York City on February 11, 2012. Santos performed songs from the album and from his time with Aventura. Three men from the audience were selected to perform "Debate de 4" with Santos. The tour opened with three consecutive shows—two of which sold out—at Madison Square Garden. The concerts at Madison Square Garden were recorded and later released as a live album titled The King Stays King: Sold Out at Madison Square Garden on November 6, 2012. By May 2012, the tour ranked at number five on the Top 20 Concert Tours grossing over US$749,885 in the country according to Pollstar.

On May 31, 2012, Santos began a world tour in Venezuela. The tour continued to Chile, Ecuador, Peru, Paraguay, Argentina,. and Colombia. In October 2012, Santos performed two concerts in Madrid and Barcelona. After his performances in Spain, he performed in Honduras, El Salvador, Guatemala, and the Dominican Republic. Santos announced that he would start the second leg of the tour on February 14, 2013, at the José Miguel Agrelot Coliseum in San Juan, Puerto Rico. Two weeks later, Santos performed in Chile and Argentina. The U.S. portion of the tour's second leg began on March 22, 2013, in Newark, New Jersey, and ended on May 3, 2013, in Hollywood, Florida. Santos performed the final leg of his tour in Mexico, where he performed six concerts.

== Critical reception ==
Professional ratings
Review scores
Source	Rating
AllMusic	favorable
Chicago Reader	favorable
Entertainment Weekly	B
Terra Networks	3/5 stars
The Washington Post	favorable

Thorn Jurek of Allmusic gave the album a positive review, and called "You" an "easy summertime groove" and "Promise" a "shimmering duet". He also wrote that Santos's mix of genres creates "an intoxicating brew." Mikael Wood of Entertainment Weekly gave the album a B rating and wrote that Santos' "solo aspirations include cracking the R&B mainstream", and that the album "generally sticks to the successful blueprint advertised by [its] title." An editor for Terra Networks gave the album 3 out of 5 stars, noting that while Santos takes risks with the sound and collaborates with other artists from different genres, the bachata tracks sound alike in the production. Peter Margasak of the Chicago Reader wrote a positive review for the album, describing the album as a successful "balancing act between past and present". He said the production of the album "gives everything vivid colors and gauzy textures", but that some songs—including the duets "Magia Negra," with Mala Rodríguez and "Rival" with Mario Domm—were "less-than-convincing detours", describing the former as a "throbbing EDM" and the latter as "treacly power balladry". Sarah Godfrey of the Washington Post gave the album a favorable review, admiring Santos for appealing to the Anglophone market without the need to "sell out bachata die-hards", citing "Promise" as the main example. Godfrey said Santos retains his style on the duet "All Aboard", and that the collaborations were "obviously meant to pull in folks who’ve never heard of Aventura". She praised the compositions, including "La Diabla" and "La Bella y Bestia", which she said are "impossible to resist, whether one understands all of the lyrics or not."

At the 19th Billboard Latin Music Awards, Formula, Vol. 1 was nominated for Album of the Year, Digital Album of the Year, and Tropical Album of the Year. At the 20th Billboard Latin Music Awards, the record received the three aforementioned awards. It was also recognized as the Top Latin Album of the Year at the 2012 Billboard Music Awards and earned a nomination in the same category the following year. At the 2012 Juventud Awards, the album won a "Lo Toco Todo (I Play Every Song)" award and a nomination for the promotional tour for the album. At the 55th Grammy Awards, Formula, Vol. 1 received a nomination for Best Tropical Latin Album, which was awarded to Marlow Rosado and La Riqueña for his album Retro. At the 25th Lo Nuestro Awards in 2013, the record was nominated for Tropical Album of the Year, but lost to Phase II by Prince Royce. In the Dominican Republic, the record was awarded Album of the Year at the 2013 Soberano Awards. At the 2013 Mexican Oye! Awards, it was nominated for Urban Album of the Year by a Soloist or Group.

== Commercial performance ==
Formula, Vol. 1 was released worldwide on November 8, 2011. As part of a deal with Walmart, a deluxe edition containing five extra tracks—the English version of "Promise", Spanish and English versions of "Aleluya", featuring American rapper Pitbull, "Malevo", and "Vale la Pena el Placer"—was released for sale exclusively at Walmart outlets. It also contained a DVD containing music videos for "You" and "Promise". A limited edition 3 disc dual sided vinyl collection of the album was also released for sale exclusively at Target stores. It contains all the tracks including the 5 extra songs from the Walmart deluxe edition. In the U.S., the album debuted and peaked at number nine on the Billboard 200 chart and debuted at number one on the Billboard Top Latin Albums and the Billboard Tropical Albums charts. 65,000 copies were sold in its first week, making it the biggest debut sales for a Latin album since El Cartel: The Big Boss by Daddy Yankee in 2007. It was at number one for seventeen non-consecutive weeks on the Top Latin Albums chart, and thirty non-consecutive weeks on the Tropical Albums chart. Formula, Vol. 1 was the best-selling Latin and Tropical album of 2012 in the U.S.

The RIAA certified the album triple platinum (Latin field) for shipping 300,000 copies. By February 2014, Formula Vol. 1 had sold over 328,000 copies in the U.S. The album peaked at number thirteen in Argentina and number seventy-seven in Spain and certified gold in Venezuela. In Mexico, it peaked at number twenty-six on the Top 100 Mexico albums chart and was certified gold by AMPROFON.

== Track listing ==
All tracks are written by Anthony "Romeo" Santos, except where noted.

No.	Title	Writer(s)	Length
1.	"Intro (Fórmula)" (featuring George Lopez)		2:12
2.	"La Diabla"		3:59
3.	"Que Se Mueran"		4:10
4.	"Llévame Contigo"		3:46
5.	"Mi Santa" (featuring Tomatito)		3:51
6.	"Promise" (featuring Usher)	Santos; Pierre Medor; Rico Love	4:12
7.	"Magia Negra" (featuring Mala Rodríguez)		3:45
8.	"Soberbio"		4:02
9.	"Skit (La Discusión)" (featuring Antony "El Mayimbe" Santos, Luis Vargas and Raulin Rodriguez)		1:33
10.	"Debate de 4" (featuring Luis Vargas, Antony "El Mayimbe" Santos and Raulin Rodriguez)		4:39
11.	"Rival" (featuring Mario Domm)	Santos; Mario Domm	4:17
12.	"La Bella y la Bestia"		3:56
13.	"You"		4:08
14.	"All Aboard" (featuring Lil Wayne)	Dwayne Carter; Medor; Love	4:14
15.	"Outro"		1:59
Total length:			54:40

Walmart Exclusive CD and DVD disc one
No.	Title	Writer(s)	Length
15.	"Aleluya (Spanglish Version)" (featuring Pitbull)		3:28
16.	"Malevo"		3:36
17.	"Promise (English version)" (featuring Usher)	Santos; Medor; Love	4:12
18.	"Aleluya (English version)" (featuring Pitbull)		3:28
19.	"Outro"	Santos	1:59
20.	"Vale la Pena el Placer"		3:06
Total length:			1:12:20

Walmart Exclusive CD and DVD Disc Two
No.	Title	Length
1.	"You (Music Video)"	4:21
2.	"Promise – Behind the Scenes"	1:23
3.	"Promise (Music Video)" (featuring Usher)	5:31
Total length:		9:52

== Personnel ==
The following credits are from Allmusic:

=== Performance credits ===
- Alexander "Chi Chi" Caba – requinto
- Matt Chamberlain – drums
- Chris Chaney – bass
- Alfonso Cid – vocals
- Carlos Dalmasí – Musical Director
- Joaquin Diaz – keyboards
- Mario Domm – director, piano, producer ("Rival")
- Miladys Fernandez – vocals
- Guillermo Frias – bongos, congas
- Lil Wayne – featured artist ("All Aboard")
- George Lopez – featured artist ("Intro")
- Rico Love – producer, vocals ("Promise", "All Aboard")
- Daniel Luna – güira
- Giselle Moya – vocals
- Tim Pierce – guitar
- Dante Rivera – bass
- Eric "Bori" Rivera – acoustic guitar, electric guitar, Nylon string guitar, requinto
- Mala Rodríguez – featured artist ("Magia Negra")
- Raulin Rodriguez – featured artist ("Debate de 4")
- Antony Santos – featured artist ("Debate de 4")
- Tomatito – featured artist, guitar ("Mi Santa")
- Usher – featured artist ("Promise")
- Luis Vargas – featured artist ("Debate de 4")
- Daniel Willy – percussion

=== Technical credits ===
- Ivan Chevere;- mixing, producer
- Omar Cruz – photography
- Isabel de Jesús – A&R
- Paul Forat – A&R
- Paula Kaminsky – marketing
- Robert Marks – mixing
- Marcos "Tainy" Masis – producer ("Magia Negra")
- Yvette Medina – marketing
- Pierre Medor – keyboards, producer, programming
- Peter Mokran – mixing
- Nely "El Arma Secreta" – producer ("Magia Negra")
- Carlos Perez – creative director
- Anthony "Romeo" Santos – arranger, composer, producer, vocals

== Charts ==
=== Weekly charts ===
Chart (2011)	Peak position
Argentine Albums (CAPIF)	13
Mexican Albums (Top 100 Mexico)	26
Spanish Albums (Promusicae)	77
Uruguayan Albums (CUD)	14
US Billboard 200	9
US Top Latin Albums (Billboard)	1
US Tropical Albums (Billboard)	1

=== Year-end charts ===
Chart (2011)	Position
US Top Latin Albums (Billboard)	12
US Tropical Albums (Billboard)	2
Chart (2012)	Position
US Billboard 200	167
US Top Latin Albums (Billboard)	1
US Tropical Albums (Billboard)	1
Chart (2013)	Position
US Top Latin Albums (Billboard)	18
US Tropical Albums (Billboard)	6
Chart (2017)	Position
US Top Latin Albums (Billboard)	22
US Tropical Albums (Billboard)	5
Chart (2018)	Position
US Top Latin Albums (Billboard)	23
US Tropical Albums (Billboard)	4
Chart (2019)	Position
US Top Latin Albums (Billboard)	31
US Tropical Albums (Billboard)	5
Chart (2020)	Position
US Top Latin Albums (Billboard)	47
US Tropical Albums (Billboard)	5
Chart (2021)	Position
US Top Latin Albums (Billboard)	46
US Tropical Albums (Billboard)	4

== Certifications ==
Region	Certification	Certified units/sales
Mexico (AMPROFON)	4× Platinum	240,000^{‡}
United States (RIAA)	24× Platinum (Latin)	1,440,000^{‡}
Venezuela	Gold	
^{‡} Sales+streaming figures based on certification alone.

== See also ==
- 2011 in Latin music
- List of number-one Billboard Latin Albums from the 2010s
- List of number-one Billboard Tropical Albums from the 2010s
