= Soberbio =

Promotional single by Romeo Santos

from the album Formula, Vol. 1
- Released: November 8, 2011 (album release)
- Recorded: 2011
- Genre: Bachata
- Length: 4:02
- Label: Sony Music
- Songwriter: Anthony "Romeo" Santos

"Soberbio" (English: "Soberbio") is a song by American singer Romeo Santos. It is a song from his first studio album Formula, Vol. 1 (2011).

== Chart performance ==
Chart (2011)	Peak position
US Hot Latin Songs (Billboard)	44
US Latin Airplay (Billboard)	49

== Certifications ==
Region	Certification	Certified units/sales
Mexico (AMPROFON)	Platinum	60,000^{‡}
^{‡} Sales+streaming figures based on certification alone.
