= Rival (song) =

Single by Romeo Santos featuring Mario Domm

from the album Fórmula, Vol. 1
- Released: March 22, 2012
- Recorded: 2010–2011
- Genre: Pop rock
- Length: 4:16
- Label: Sony Latin
- Songwriters: Romeo Santos; Mario Domm

Romeo Santos singles chronology
"All Aboard" (2011)	"Rival" (2012)	"La Diabla" (2012)

Mario Domm singles chronology
"Rival" (2012)	"Llorar" (2012)

Music video
- "Rival" on YouTube

"Rival" ("Rival") is a Pop rock song written and performed by Dominican-American singer-songwriter Romeo Santos and Camila lead singer Mario Domm. Produced by Santos, the track was released in Latin America and the United States as the third single from his debut solo album Fórmula, Vol. 1 (2011).

== Background ==
Romeo Santos was the lead member of Aventura, an urban and bachata infused band, which sold 1.7 million albums in the United States and had the best-selling Latin album of 2009 The Last. After the band's temporary separation, Santos was announced as the star of an upcoming comedy series to be premiered on ABC. The series will deal with the struggle of a Dominican American fighting his beliefs to success in the United States and will be Santos debut acting job. Following the announcement, Santos signed a record deal with Sony Music Entertainment and recorded his debut studio album, Formula, Vol. 1, which includes most of the tracks in bachata rhythm and bilingual songs such as the lead single "You" and "Promise", featuring Usher.

== Chart performance ==
Chart (2012)	Peak position
Mexico (Monitor Latino)	10
US Hot Latin Songs (Billboard)	42
US Latin Pop Airplay (Billboard)	22

== Certifications ==
Region	Certification	Certified units/sales
Mexico (AMPROFON)	2× Platinum	120,000^{‡}
^{‡} Sales+streaming figures based on certification alone.
