= All Aboard (Romeo Santos song) =

Single by Romeo Santos featuring Lil Wayne

from the album Fórmula, Vol. 1
- Released: March 9, 2012
- Genre: R&B
- Length: 4:14
- Label: Sony Latin
- Songwriters: Romeo Santos; Dwayne Michael Carter, Jr.; Pierre Medor; Richard Butler, Jr.
- Producer: Rico Love

Romeo Santos singles chronology
"Mi Santa" (2012)	"All Aboard" (2012)	"Rival" (2012)

Lil Wayne singles chronology
"Faded" (2012)	"All Aboard" (2012)	"Take It to the Head" (2012)

Music video
- "All Aboard" on YouTube

"All Aboard" is a R&B song by Romeo Santos, featuring Lil Wayne, from Santos' debut album Fórmula, Vol. 1 (2011). The track was co-written and produced by Rico Love. It was released as the album's fourth single.

== Background ==
After the temporary separation of the band Aventura, Romeo Santos signed a record deal with Sony Music Latin and recorded his debut studio album, Formula, Vol. 1, which includes most of the tracks in bachata rhythm and bilingual songs such as the lead single "You", which peaked at number-one in the Billboard Latin Songs, and "Promise", with vocals by American singer Usher.

== Chart performance ==
Chart (2012)	Peak position
US Latin Digital Songs (Billboard)	8
