= Llévame Contigo (song) =

- Live version cover

Single by Romeo Santos

from the album Formula, Vol. 1
- Released: August 20, 2012
- Genre: Bachata
- Length: 4:00
- Label: Sony Latin
- Songwriter: Romeo Santos

Romeo Santos singles chronology
"La Diabla" (2012)	"Llévame Contigo" (2012)	"Reza Por Mi" (2013)

Music video
- "Llévame Contigo" on YouTube

"Llévame Contigo" ("Take Me with You") is a bachata song by American singer Romeo Santos from his debut studio album Formula, Vol. 1 (2011). A live version of the song was released as a single from The King Stays King: Sold Out at Madison Square Garden (2012).

== Charts ==
Chart (2012–13)	Peak position
US Hot Latin Songs (Billboard)	2
US Latin Airplay (Billboard)	1
US Tropical Airplay (Billboard)	1

== Certifications ==
Region	Certification	Certified units/sales
Mexico (AMPROFON)	Diamond+Gold	330,000^{‡}
Spain (Promusicae)	Platinum	60,000^{‡}
United States (RIAA)	13× Platinum (Latin)	780,000^{‡}
^{‡} Sales+streaming figures based on certification alone.

== See also ==
- List of Billboard number-one Latin songs of 2013
