= La Diabla (Romeo Santos song) =

Single by Romeo Santos

from the album Formula, Vol. 1
- Released: April 25, 2012
- Genre: Bachata
- Length: 3:39
- Label: Sony Latin
- Songwriter: Romeo Santos

Romeo Santos singles chronology
"Rival" (2012)	"La Diabla" (2012)	"Llévame Contigo" (2012)

Music video
- "La Diabla / Mi Santa" on YouTube

"La Diabla" ("She-Devil") is a bachata song by American singer Romeo Santos from his debut studio album Formula, Vol. 1 (2011). Produced by Santos, the track was released as the album's last single in Latin America and the United States. The track was nominated for Tropical Song of the Year at the Premio Lo Nuestro 2013.

== Background ==
Romeo Santos was the lead member of Aventura, an urban and bachata infused band, which sold 1.7 million albums in the United States and had the best-selling Latin album of 2009 The Last. After the band's temporary separation, Santos was announced as the star of an upcoming comedy series to be premiered on ABC. The series will deal with the struggle of a Dominican American fighting his beliefs to success in the United States and will be Santos debut acting job. Following the announcement, Santos signed a record deal with Sony Music Entertainment and recorded his debut studio album, Formula, Vol. 1, which includes most of the tracks in bachata rhythm and bilingual songs such as the lead single "You" and "Promise", featuring Usher.

== Charts and certifications ==
=== Weekly charts ===
Chart (2012)	Peak position
US Bubbling Under Hot 100 (Billboard)	14
US Hot Latin Songs (Billboard)	1
US Latin Pop Airplay (Billboard)	2
US Tropical Airplay (Billboard)	1

=== Year-end charts ===
Chart (2012)	Position
US Hot Latin Songs (Billboard)	22

=== Certifications ===
Region	Certification	Certified units/sales
Mexico (AMPROFON)	Diamond+Gold	330,000^{‡}
United States (RIAA)	3× Platinum (Latin)	180,000^{‡}
^{‡} Sales+streaming figures based on certification alone.

== See also ==
- List of number-one Billboard Hot Tropical Songs of 2012
- List of number-one Billboard Top Latin Songs of 2012
