= You (Romeo Santos song) =

Single by Romeo Santos

from the album Fórmula, Vol. 1
- Released: May 9, 2011
- Genre: Bachata; R&B
- Length: 4:08
- Label: Sony Latin
- Songwriter: Romeo Santos

Romeo Santos singles chronology
"Me Voy (Remix)" (2007)	"You" (2011)	"Promise" (2011)

Music video
- "You" on YouTube

"You" is the debut solo single by American singer Romeo Santos, released on May 9, 2011 as the lead single from his debut studio album Fórmula, Vol. 1 (2011). Produced by Santos, the track was released in Latin America and the United States.

The song, named a promising start for the former member of Aventura, combines elements of bachata and R&B and debuted atop the Billboard's Latin Songs chart, with Santos becoming the eighth performer in the history of the chart to start at this position.

== Background ==
Romeo Santos was the lead member of Aventura, an urban and bachata infused band, which sold 1.7 million albums in the United States and had the best-selling Latin album of 2009 The Last. After the band's temporary separation, Santos was announced as the star of an upcoming comedy series to be premiered on ABC. The series will deal with the struggle of a Dominican American fighting his beliefs to success in the United States and will be Santos debut acting job. Following the announcement, Santos signed a record deal with Sony Music Entertainment and recorded his debut studio album, Formula, Vol. 1, which includes most of the tracks in bachata rhythm and bilingual songs such as the lead single "You" and "Promise", featuring Usher.

== Chart performance ==
"You" was selected as the lead single from the album and released to airplay on May 9, 2011. The song debuted at number-one in the Billboard Hot Latin Songs chart in the week of May 28, 2011, with Santos becoming the eighth performer to start the top position of the chart following Juanes, Juan Gabriel, Enrique Iglesias, Marco Antonio Solís, Los Temerarios, Ricky Martin and Maná. "You" spent seven weeks at this position, which was named a promising start by Carlos Quintana of About.com, stating that the song combines elements of bachata and R&B as was the characteristic sound of Santos' band Aventura.

== Charts ==
=== Weekly charts ===
Chart (2011)	Peak position
Mexico Airplay (Billboard)	21
US Billboard Hot 100	97
US Hot Latin Songs (Billboard)	1
US Latin Pop Airplay (Billboard)	2
US Tropical Airplay (Billboard)	1

=== Year-end charts ===
Chart (2011)	Position
US Hot Latin Songs (Billboard)	8

== Certifications ==
Region	Certification	Certified units/sales
Mexico (AMPROFON)	Platinum+Gold	90,000^{‡}
United States (RIAA)	5× Platinum (Latin)	300,000^{‡}
^{‡} Sales+streaming figures based on certification alone.

== Track listing and formats ==
- Digital download
1. "You" – 4:08

== See also ==
- List of number-one Billboard Hot Tropical Songs of 2011
- List of number-one Billboard Top Latin Songs of 2011
