= Taboo (Don Omar song) =

Single by Don Omar

from the album Meet the Orphans
- Released: January 24, 2011
- Recorded: 2010
- Genre: Dance
- Length: 4:52
- Label: Universal Latino; Machete
- Songwriters: William Landrón; Gonzalo Hermosa; Ulises Hermosa; Milton Restituyo
- Producer: A&X And Eliel

Don Omar singles chronology
"Huérfano De Amor" (2011)	"Taboo" (2011)	"Estoy Enamorado" (2011)

"Taboo" is the second single from Don Omar's collaborative album Meet the Orphans released on January 24, 2011, through Universal Latino. The song is an adapted version from the Los Kjarkas's song "Llorando se fue" most commonly known for its use in Kaoma's 1989 hit single "Lambada", fused with Latin beats. The song peaked at number one on the Billboard Latin Songs, becoming his third number one single on the chart.

== Background ==
A low-quality preview of the song was posted on October 19, 2009, planned to be included on the now-unreleased album iDon 2.0, the re-release of his 2009 album iDon. The album was never released, and in 2010 the song was mastered and included on Meet the Orphans.

== Critical reception ==
Brian Voerding from AOL Radio Blog said that the song "It's a down-and-dirty dance number that melds traditional island rhythms with a techno-friendly undercurrent and bright synthesizer melodies. [...]" Omar, along with Daddy Yankee and others, is one of the primary faces and souls of Reggaeton, a relatively new term for music that blends reggae with contemporary hip-hop and electronic elements. received and award for "Urban Song of the Year" at the 2012 ASCAP Awards, which are awarded annually by the American Society of Composers, Authors and Publishers in the United States.

== Chart performance ==
On the issue of March 5, 2011 the song debuted at number 41 on the Billboard Latin Songs, peaking at number one on the week of July 16, 2011, becoming his third number one single on the chart, and number 23 on the Billboard Latin Pop Airplay, peaking at number 2. On the issue of April 2, 2011 the song debuted at number 28 on the Latin Tropical Airplay, peaking at number 1. On the issue of May 14, 2011 the song also debuted on the Bubbling Under Hot 100 Singles chart at position 15, and weeks after, topped the chart. It later debuted at number 97 on the Billboard Hot 100 giving Don Omar his third single to enter the chart. The song was certified gold in Brasil and Spain.

== Remix ==
On January 28, 2012, an official remix featuring Daddy Yankee was included on Musicólogo & Menes' debut mixtape El Imperio Nazza.

== Music video ==
=== Development ===
The music video for the song was shot in both the Dominican Republic and Brazil, directed by Marlon Pena and produced by Noelia Cacavelli. It was premiered on April 12, 2011 through Vevo and YouTube. The music video contains clips from the 2011 movie Fast Five (also known as Fast & Furious 5), where he is guest star, as well guest appearances from the movie cast including Vin Diesel, Paul Walker, Tyrese Gibson, Dwayne Johnson, Ludacris and Tego Calderón.

=== Reception ===
According to Don Omar's Universal website, the video has a strong storyline and recaptures the essence of the popular Brazilian version, which is heavily influenced by choreographed dance moves. As of July 2023, the music video has received 924 million views, becoming his second most viewed video after "Danza Kuduro".

== Charts ==
=== Weekly charts ===
Chart (2011–2012)	Peak position
Argentina (Top 20)	2
Chile (Top 20)	6
Dominican Republic (Top Latino)	3
Mexico Airplay Chart (Billboard International)	5
Czech Republic Airplay (ČNS IFPI)	21
Spain (Promusicae)	36
US Billboard Hot 100	97
US Hot Latin Songs (Billboard)	1
US Latin Pop Airplay (Billboard)	2
US Tropical Airplay (Billboard)	1
US Latin Rhythm Airplay (Billboard)	1
Venezuela (International Chart)	58
Venezuela (Latin Chart)	16

=== Year-end charts ===
Chart (2011)	Position
US Hot Latin Songs (Billboard)	2

=== Decade-end charts ===
Chart (2010–2019)	Position
US Hot Latin Songs (Billboard)	22

== Certifications ==
Region	Certification	Certified units/sales
Brazil (Pro-Música Brasil)	Gold	30,000^{‡}
Spain (Promusicae)	Gold	30,000^{‡}
^{‡} Sales+streaming figures based on certification alone.
