= Bailando Por El Mundo =

Single by Juan Magan featuring Pitbull and El Cata

from the album The King of Dance
- Released: October 4, 2011
- Recorded: 2011
- Genre: Merenhouse
- Length: 3:15
- Label: Sony Music
- Songwriters: Juan Magan; Armando Perez; Edward Bello; Dj Buddha
- Producers: Juan Magan; Dj Buddha

Juan Magan singles chronology
"Bailando Por Ahí" (2011)	"Bailando Por El Mundo" (2011)	"Se Vuelva Loca" (2012)

Pitbull singles chronology
"I Like How It Feels" (2011)	"Bailando Por El Mundo" (2011)	"International Love" (2011)

El Cata singles chronology
"Wanna be Yours" (2011)	"Bailando Por El Mundo" (2011)

"Bailando Por El Mundo" ("Dancing Through the World") is the single by Spanish producer, singer, remixer and DJ of electronic music Juan Magan, featuring vocals from American artist Pitbull, and Dominican artist El Cata. It was released as a digital download on October 4, 2011. The song was a hit in Spain and became a number one hit on the Billboard Hot Latin Songs chart. The track was nominated for Collaboration and Urban Song of the Year at the Premio Lo Nuestro 2013.

== Track listing ==
- Digital download
1. Bailando por el mundo – 3:15
2. Bailando por el mundo (Explicit Version) – 3:15

== Credits and personnel ==
- Lead vocals – Juan Magan, Pitbull and El Cata
- Producers – Magan & Dj Buddha
- Lyrics – Juan Magan, Armando Perez, Edward Bello
- Label: Sony Music

== Chart performance ==
=== Weekly charts ===
Chart (2011–12)	Peak position
Spain (Promusicae)	22
Switzerland (Schweizer Hitparade)	15
US Hot Latin Songs (Billboard)	1
US Tropical Airplay (Billboard)	1
US Latin Rhythm Airplay (Billboard)	1

=== Year-end charts ===
Chart (2012)	Position
US Hot Latin Songs (Billboard)	4

=== Decade-end charts ===
Chart (2010–2019)	Position
US Hot Latin Songs (Billboard)	48

== Release history ==
Region	Date	Format	Label
Worldwide	October 4, 2011	Digital Download	Sony Music

== See also ==
- List of number-one Billboard Top Latin Songs of 2012
- internet.realitytvcalendar.com/pitbull-rapper-career.html Pitbull Biography
