= Juan Magán =

Spanish DJ (born 1978)

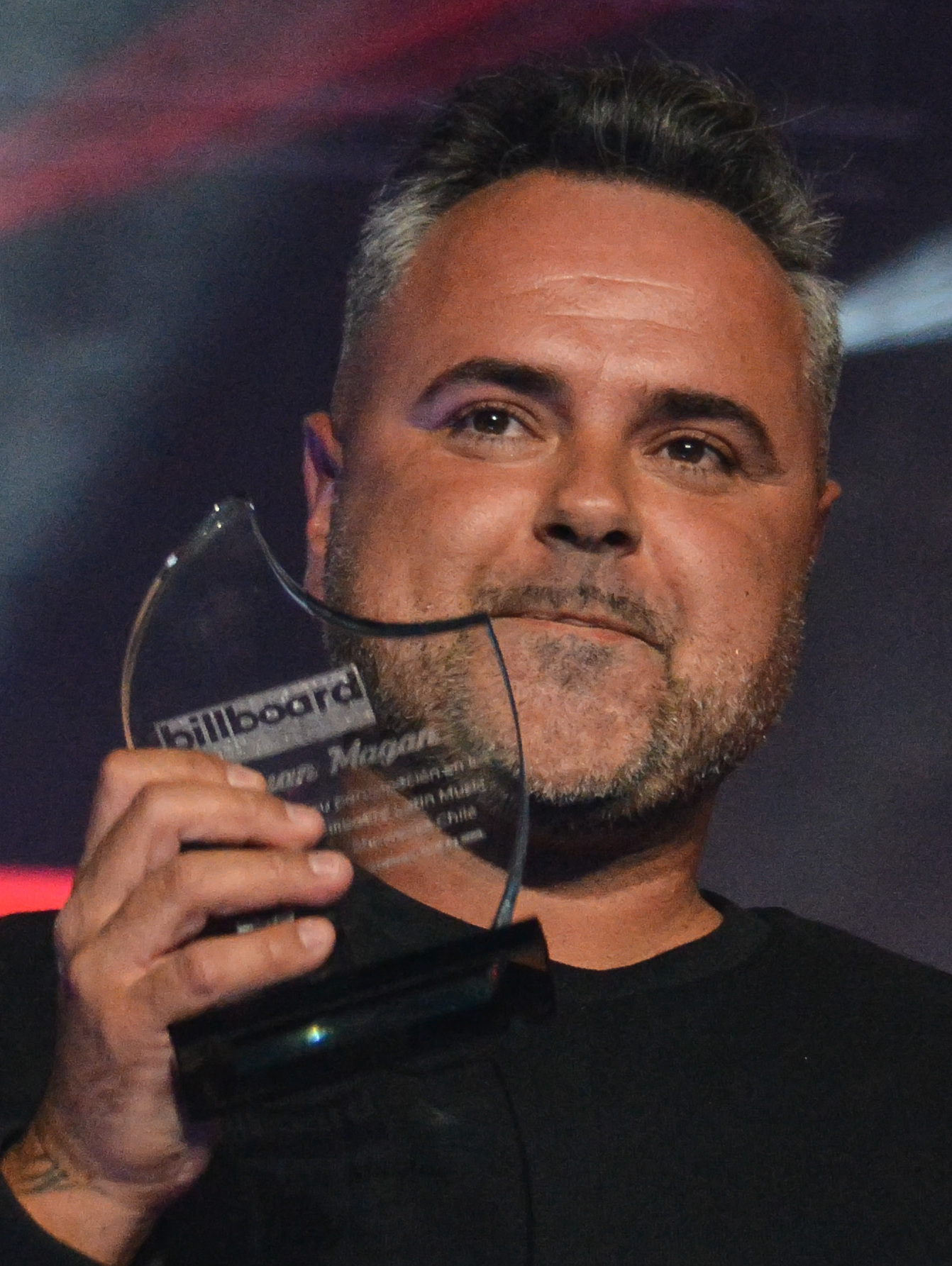
- Magán in 2018

Background information
- Born: Juan Manuel Magán González; 30 September 1978 (age 47); Badalona, Spain
- Genres: Electro latino
- Occupations: DJ, record producer, remixer, singer
- Instrument: Vocals
- Years active: 2003–present
- Labels: Universal Music Latin, Cat Music
- Website: www.juanmagan.es

Juan Manuel Magán González (Spanish pronunciation: [ˈxwam maˈnwel maˈɣaŋ ɡonˈθaleθ]; born 30 September 1978) is a Spanish producer, singer, remixer and DJ of electronic dance music, recognized internationally for his contributions to the "Electro Latino" category of music.

As a remixer, he has worked with the following artists, among others: J Balvin, Selena, Don Omar, Paulina Rubio, Juanes, Nelly Furtado, Dulce María, Pitbull, Michael Gray, Milk & Sugar, Future, MC Fioti, Bob Sinclar, Gary Nesta Pine, Ian Oliver, Azzido da Bass, Jerry Ropero, E Smoove, Barbara Muñoz, Pier Bucci, Tara McDonald, CeeLo Green and INNA.

== Biography ==
Juan Magán became interested in music in 1994, when he began to frequent the discothèques. It started with a computer, a sampler and an analog synthesizer. In 2004, he launched his own music in the Latin register and with experience, he formed a group called Guajiros del Puerto two years later. Their hit Veo Veo became a real success all over Latin America.

Between 2007 and 2009, he formed a duet with Marcos Rodríguez called Magán & Rodríguez. His debut album, Suave, premiered with Marcos Rodríguez in 2009, included Suck My - Suave, Bora Bora, The Rising Mano, El Globo, El Otro Yo Soy, Loco, and Merenguito. In 2009, he released a compilation to Vale Music / Universal Music Spain, featuring Mariah (You Know I Want You) featuring Lumidee, "Yolanda (Tú no)" feat. Irmãos Verdades, Verano Azul, and as well as "Bailando Por Ahí", a tube of electronic merengue. His singles "Bora Bora" and "Verano Azul" are double platinum certified.

In 2010, he made a feature on the single made by Inna, called "Un Momento". In 2011, a new version of "Bailando Por Ahi" is released, renamed 'Bailando Por el Mundo" with Pitbull and El Cata. He also featured in a Don Omar single, Ella No Sigue Modas. In 2013, the artist Farruko recorded a song with Magan.

In 2015, he designed a summer hit entitled "He llorado" with Gente de Zona. In that same year, he became a naturalized Dominican citizen. In March 2016, he released a new song called "Baila Conmigo", In October 2016, he released a new Album called "Quiero Que Sepas." In November 2017, he released a new single called "Dejate Llevar" ft Belinda, Manuel Turizo.

== Magán & Rodríguez ==
His early discography includes "Suave", created with Marcos Rodríguez, which included the greatest electronic and Latin successes of the time on a global level: "Suck My - Suave", "Bora Bora", "Que levante la mano mi gente", "El Globo", "El otro soy yo", "Loco", "Merenguito" were all supported by the most influential DJs and in style in the global House scene, and on top of the official sales list in Spain and on the global level has become the second in the world in total digital sales by Beatport with "Bora Bora".

They went double platinum with the singles "Bora Bora" and album Suave.

== Career ==
His most recent work is his album, 4.0, which was released in July 2019. It includes the singles, “Usted” (Ft. Mala Rodríguez), "Internacional" (Ft. CeeLo Green) and “Escondidos” (Ft. B-Case).

== Legacy ==
He was nominated the Best House Artist in the World by the Beatport Awards. He went double platinum with "Verano Azul". Magán received a Latin Grammy nomination for Best New Artist in 2012.

== Discography ==
- The King of Dance (2012)
- The King Is Back (#LatinIBIZAte) (2015)
- Quiero Que Sepas (2016)
- 4.0 (2019)
