= Promise (Romeo Santos song) =

2011 song by Romeo Santos

Single by Romeo Santos featuring Usher

from the album Fórmula, Vol. 1
- Released: September 1, 2011
- Genre: Bachata; R&B
- Length: 4:12
- Label: Sony Latin
- Songwriters: Romeo Santos; Pierre Medor; Richard Butler, Jr.
- Producer: Rico Love

Romeo Santos singles chronology
| "You" (2011) | "Promise" (2011) | "Mi Santa" (2012) |

Usher singles chronology
| "Dirty Dancer" (2011) | "Promise" (2011) | "Without You" (2011) |

Music video
- "Promise (Spanglish Version)" on YouTube "Promise (English Version)" on YouTube

"Promise" is a song by Romeo Santos, featuring Usher, from Santos' debut studio album Fórmula, Vol. 1 (2011). The track was co-written and produced by Rico Love. It was released as the album's second single in Latin America and the United States.

The song combines elements of bachata and R&B and peaked atop the Billboard's Latin Songs chart, becoming the second consecutive number-one song in the chart for Santos and the first for Usher. It is recognized as one of Romeo Santos's signature songs. The music video for "Promise" was directed by Anthony Mandler, who previously worked with Rihanna, Jay-Z and Kanye West.

== Background ==
After the temporary separation of the band, Aventura, Romeo Santos signed a record deal with Sony Music Entertainment and recorded his debut studio album, Formula, Vol. 1, which includes most of the tracks in bachata rhythm and bilingual songs such as the lead single "You", which peaked at number-one in the Billboard Latin Songs, and "Promise", with vocals by R&B singer Usher. The collaboration came through because Santos' manager Johnny Marines introduced Usher to Santos. Usher was impressed by Santos ability to perform after seeing him on YouTube, saying: "This is the thing that people will remember". "Promise" was co-written and produced by Rico Love and features Usher singing on bachata rhythm for the first time. According to Carlos Quintana of About.com the song and the rest of the tracks included on Formula, Vol. 1 may be classified as Latin urban contemporary with R&B and hip hop influences. The track was named "fluttering" by Mikael Wood of Entertainment Weekly on his review of the parent album.

== Music video ==
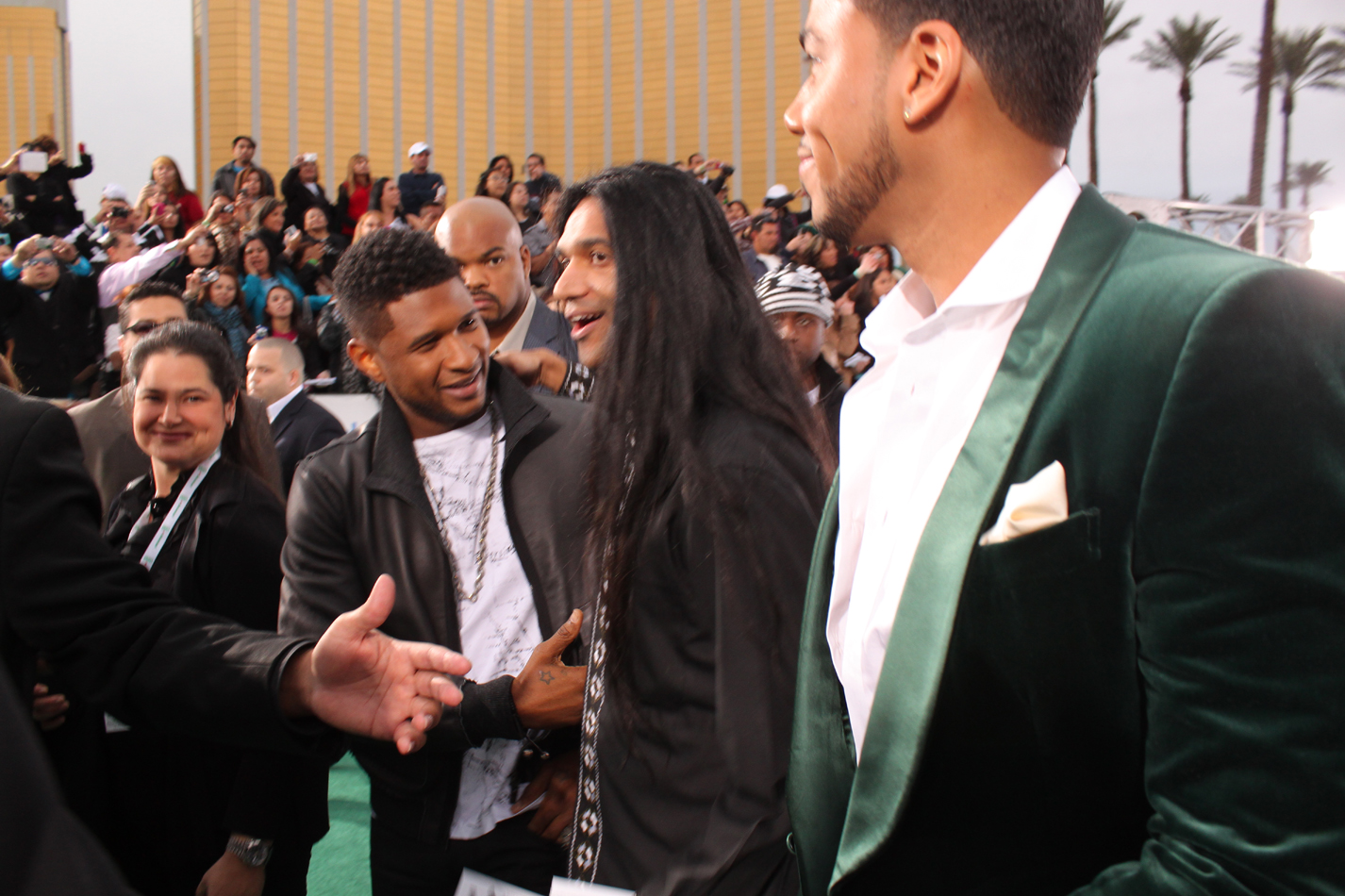
Santos with Usher on the red carpet in 2011

The music video for "Promise" was directed by Anthony Mandler who worked previously with Jay-Z, Kanye West and Rihanna. Usher and Santos spent 24 hours on set, with a highly specialized a scenic setting, full lights, cameras and special effects. The video shows both performers singing to their love partners about the love they feel for them and asked them to promise to never leave them without their love. Upon release the video has had a heavy rotation on MTV reaching the top of the most-played list, even with Santos performing in Spanish language, something noted by Ruben Leyva, Sony U.S. Latin president, commenting that Santos has been "able to do what other artists have been able to do-reach a dominant-English-speaking audience-only by singing in Spanish".

== Live performances ==
The song was performed by Santos and Usher for the first time in the Latin Grammy Awards of 2011 on November 11, 2011 in Las Vegas, and received a standing ovation.

== Chart performance ==
"Promise" was released as the second single from Fórmula, Vol. 1 to airplay and digital download on September 2, 2011. The song was the highest debut at the Billboard Latin Songs chart on the week of September 24, 2011 at number 24, climbing to the top ten the following week. The song reached the top of the chart the week of October 29, 2011 replacing Ricardo Arjona's "El Amor". "Promise" became the second number-one single for Santos in the chart, following the seven-week reign of his previous single "You". The song is also the first number-one in the chart for Usher surpassing his highest-placement in the chart with "DJ Got Us Fallin' in Love" which peaked at number 16 in 2010. According to Nielsen SoundScan the track has sold 49,000 digital downloads in the United States.

== Charts ==
=== Weekly charts ===
| Chart (2011–12) | Peak position |
|---|---|
| Mexico Airplay (Billboard) | 14 |
| Mexico (Monitor Latino) | 20 |
| US Billboard Hot 100 | 83 |
| US Hot Latin Songs (Billboard) | 1 |
| US Latin Pop Airplay (Billboard) | 1 |
| US Tropical Airplay (Billboard) | 1 |

=== Year-end charts ===
| Chart (2011) | Position |
|---|---|
| US Hot Latin Songs (Billboard) | 61 |
| Chart (2012) | Position |
| US Hot Latin Songs (Billboard) | 14 |

=== Decade-end charts ===
| Chart (2010–2019) | Position |
|---|---|
| US Hot Latin Songs (Billboard) | 26 |

== Certifications ==
| Region | Certification | Certified units/sales |
|---|---|---|
| Canada (Music Canada) | Platinum | 80,000^{‡} |
| Mexico (AMPROFON) | 3× Platinum+Gold | 210,000^{‡} |
| United States (RIAA) | 53× Platinum (Latin) | 3,180,000^{‡} |
^{‡} Sales+streaming figures based on certification alone.

== Track listing and formats ==
Original Version

1. "Promise" – 4:13

English Version

1. "Promise (English Version)" – 4:13

== See also ==
- List of number-one Billboard Hot Latin Pop Airplay of 2011
- List of number-one Billboard Hot Tropical Songs of 2011
- List of number-one Billboard Top Latin Songs of 2011
- List of Billboard number-one Latin songs of 2012
