= Romeo Santos =

American singer (born 1981)

- Santos in 2015
- Born: Anthony Santos; July 21, 1981 (age 45); New York City
- Occupations: Singer; songwriter; record producer
- Years active: 1994–present
- Spouse: Francelys Infante
- Children: 5
- Awards: Full list
- Musical career
- Genres: Bachata; Latin pop
- Instrument: Vocals
- Works: Albums
- Labels: RCA; Sony Latin; Jive
- Member of: Aventura
- Website: www.romeo-santos.com

Anthony "Romeo" Santos (born July 21, 1981) is an American singer, songwriter, and record producer. He first rose to prominence as the lead vocalist and frontman of the bachata group Aventura, one of the most influential Latin music bands of the 2000s. Santos later established a successful solo career, achieving seven number-one songs on Billboard's Hot Latin Songs chart and eighteen number-one hits on the Tropical Airplay chart. He has sold over 24 million records worldwide, making him one of the best-selling Latin music artists of all time.

== Early life ==
Anthony Santos was born and raised in the New York City borough of the Bronx, on July 21, 1981, to a Dominican father and a Puerto Rican mother. He had a humble upbringing, with his father, who worked in construction, being underpaid but being able to make ends meet for his family. His mother was a stay-at-home mom who took care of him and his siblings in Crotona, Bronx on Vyse Street. Santos attended public school in the Bronx and began his career by singing in a church choir at a young age. He was exposed to various Latin genres of music including salsa, merengue, and bachata, listening to them at a young age due to his parents' love for them.

== Music career ==
=== Early career and Aventura (1994–2011) ===
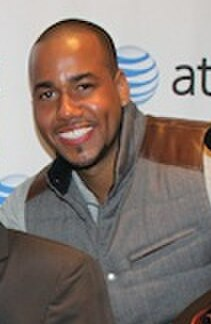
Santos in 2011

Santos was the lead singer, songwriter, and co-producer of Aventura. He formed the group in 1994 with his cousin Henry Santos "Hustle Hard", and friends Lenny Santos "Len Melody", and Max Santos "Mikey a.k.a. Max Agende". Romeo and Henry met Lenny and Max in 1993. The following year, they formed a band and called themselves Los Tinellers. In 1995 they met a man by the name of Elvin Polanco who would eventually manage and help them record their first album titled Trampa de Amor (1996). Polanco went through some health problems, which ended things between him and the group. Later on they met Julio César García, who would become their manager and would re-invent them as Aventura. In 1998, they signed with Premium Latin Music with Franklin Romero.

Aventura released their debut album in 1999 titled Generation Next with the hopes of bringing bachata into the mainstream from its traditional base and fusing it with hip hop and R&B. The album included the single "Cuándo Volverás", which is one of their popular songs. In 2002, the song "Obsesión" achieved huge success in many countries, topping charts in France, Germany and Italy. It was part of their second album, We Broke the Rules. Aventura released three more studio albums and three live albums in a decade, spawning many top 10 internationally famous hits like "Hermanita", "Ella y Yo" featuring Don Omar, which elevated the group's success in 2005, "Un Beso", "Los Infieles", "El Perdedor", "Por un Segundo", and "Dile al Amor". They were the first bachata act to sell out Madison Square Garden in 2007. They broke multiple records in arenas and stadiums worldwide.

In February 2007, they made their first cameo appearance in the Dominican comedy film Sanky Panky, starring Fausto Mata and directed by José Enrique Pintor (Pinky), which became the highest-grossing film in Dominican cinema.

In 2009, Aventura was invited to perform for President Barack Obama at the White House. In 2011, Aventura took a hiatus. According to Romeo, the group was "on pause to do individual projects".

=== Solo career and Formula, Vol. 1 (2011–2013) ===
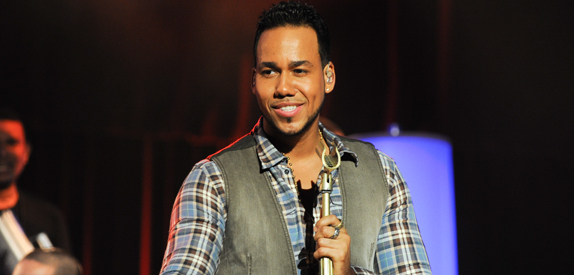
Romeo Santos at Walmart Acceso Total in 2011

In April 2011, after his success as a songwriter and lead singer for Aventura, Romeo announced he was leaving the band to pursue a solo career. Romeo Santos signed with Sony Music Latin on April 7, 2011. On May 9, 2011, Santos released his first single off his debut album Formula, Vol. 1, called "You". The song peaked at 97 on the Billboard 100 and at number 1 on the Hot Latin and Tropical Songs Billboard charts. The music video was released on May 9, 2011.

The second single, "Promise" was released on September 1, 2011, and featured a collaboration with R&B singer Usher. The single peaked at number 83 on the Billboard 100 and at number 1 on Hot Latin, Latin Pop and Tropical Songs Billboard charts. The song was certified Diamond, 34× Platinum as of August 31, 2022, in the United States by the Recording Industry Association of America (RIAA). The music video was released on October 4, 2011, and it was directed by Anthony Mandler. A full English version in which Romeo is singing in English was also made. He released Formula, Vol. 1 on November 8, 2011. The album featured collaborations with Usher, La Mala Rodríguez, Mario Domm from the trio Camila, Tomatito, Lil Wayne and George Lopez. It also featured bachata legends Antony "El Mayimbe" Santos, Luis Vargas, and Raulin Rodriguez as they united for the song "Debate de 4".

In February 2012, he sold out New York City's Madison Square Garden for three nights. The first night kicked off The King Stays King tour, which was the tour of his first solo album. The tour featured artists like Antony "El Mayimbe" Santos, Luis Vargas, Wisin & Yandel, P. Diddy, and Usher. On August 20, 2012, a live version of the song "Llévame Contigo" was released as a single to promote Santos's first live album as a solo artist. On November 6, 2012, Santos released The King Stays King: Sold Out at Madison Square Garden. It is a CD and DVD based on the three nights at MSG. This is his first live album and concert film as a solo artist. The live album peaked at number 65 on the Billboard 200 and at number 1 on both the Top Latin and Tropical Albums Billboard charts.

In December 2012, he sold out twice in a row at the Félix Sánchez Olympic Stadium in Santo Domingo, Dominican Republic on the 15th and 22nd of that month. Santos made history selling out two nights at a stadium with a capacity of over 50,000 for concerts. This was the end of the 2012 portion of the tour. In February 2013. He started the 2013 portion of the tour with two nights at the José Miguel Agrelot Coliseum in San Juan, Puerto Rico on the 14th and 15th of that month. The tour would continue until July 2013.

=== Formula, Vol. 2 and Aventura reunion (2013–2016) ===
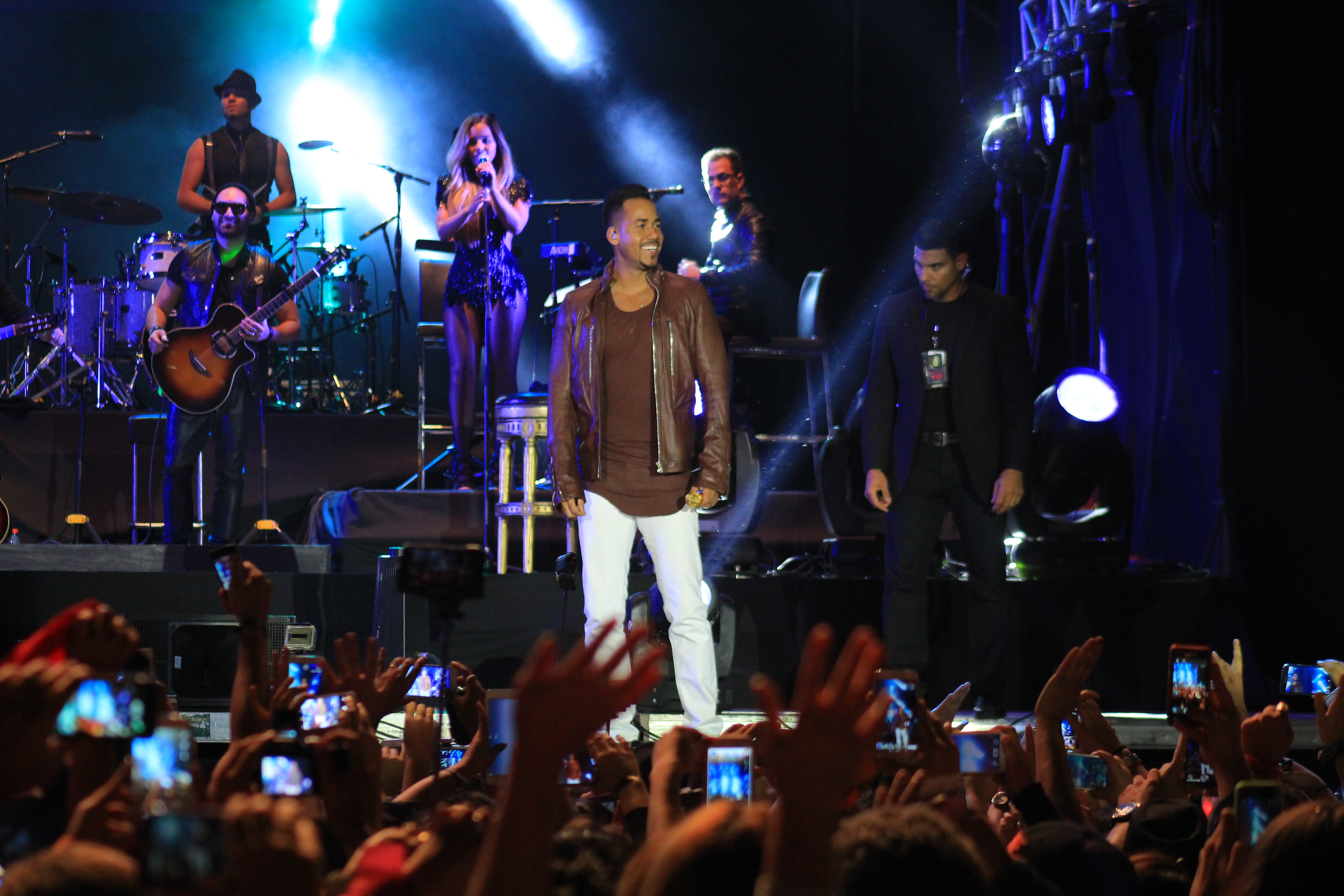
Santos performing at the Julio Martínez Prádanos National Stadium in 2015

On July 30, 2013, he released the first single off his second album, "Propuesta Indecente". It peaked at number 79 on the Billboard 100 and at number 1 on the Billboard Hot Latin Songs chart. As of 2021, it is the second best-performing Latin song of all-time on that chart. It lasted on the chart for 125 weeks in which 4 of those weeks were positioned at number 1. It also peaked at number 1 on the Latin and Tropical Airplay Billboard charts. The song was certified 51× Platinum in the United States by the Recording Industry Association of America (RIAA), making it his most certified song to this day. It received a Lo Nuestro Award for Tropical Song of the Year in 2014. The music video for this single reach over 2 billion views on YouTube as of 2023.

On January 28, 2014, second single, "Odio", was released. It featured Canadian rapper Drake. It peaked at number 45 on the Billboard 100, making it Romeo's best single in that chart to this day. It peaked at number 1 on the Billboard Hot Latin Songs chart as well and lasted 13 weeks on that position. It also peaked at number 1 on the Latin and Tropical Airplay Billboard charts. This song was the first time Drake sang in Spanish. It was certified Diamond, 34× Platinum as of August 31, 2022, in the United States by the Recording Industry Association of America (RIAA).

His second album, Formula, Vol. 2, was released on February 25, 2014. It featured collaborations with Drake, Nicki Minaj, Marc Anthony, Carlos Santana, Tego Calderón, and Kevin Hart. Formula, Vol. 2 became the best-selling Latin album of 2014. In 2020, the album was awarded Billboard Top Latin Album of the decade at the 2020 Billboard Latin Music Awards. It is his most certified album to this day as it was certified 27× Platinum in the United States by the Recording Industry Association of America (RIAA).

In July 2014, he sold out an entire double-header show at Yankee Stadium on the 11th and 12th of that month. Santos was the first Latin artist to headline at the stadium. The Fania All-Stars last did so, one block south at the old Yankee Stadium on August 24, 1973. This show featured a special Aventura reunion to close out night two. On November 6, 2014, Santos would perform for a second time at the White House to co-headline an event in honor Veterans Day for war veterans. This was his first performance as a solo artist. He would perform the song "Jose", which is a song from Aventura. This event was hosted by 44th President of the United States Barack Obama and former first lady Michelle Obama. The event aired the next day on PBS in a special titled A Salute to the Troops: In Performance at the White House.

In July 2015, he sold out three nights at the Barclays Center in Brooklyn, New York on the 10th, 11th, and 12th of that month. On December 1, 2015, it was announce that Aventura would reunite to have a series of concerts for the whole month of February 2016 at the United Palace Theater in New York City. Their first concert since their split began in front of a sold-out crowd on February 4, 2016, with the final concert on February 28, 2016. After that, Romeo continued with his Vol. 2 tour until August 2016.

=== Golden (2017–2018) ===
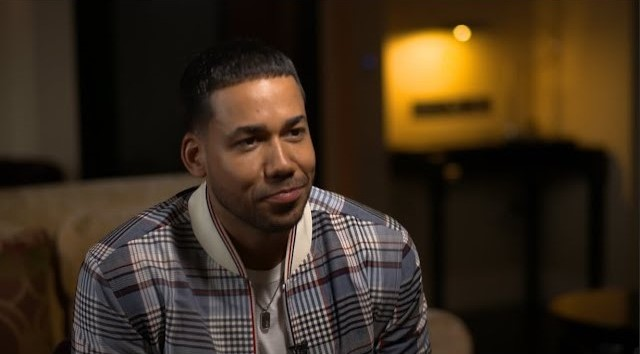
Romeo Santos in the UK in 2020

On February 10, 2017, he released the song "Héroe Favorito". It is the lead single for his third studio album Golden. Santos partnered with Marvel Comics to design the art cover for the single. It debuted at number 2 on the Billboard Hot Latin Songs chart and lasted 13 weeks on that position. It also debuted at number 1 on the Billboard Latin Airplay Chart. It also debuted at number 1 Tropical Airplay chart and lasted 8 weeks in that position. The music video was released 4 days later on Valentine's Day 2018. It was shot in Los Angeles, California. It featured American actress Génesis Rodríguez, who voiced Honey Lemon in Disney's 2014 film Big Hero 6.

On June 23, 2017, he released his second, "Imitadora". It peaked at number 5 on the Billboard Hot Latin Songs chart. It also peaked at number 1 on the Billboard Latin Airplay Charts, and lasted four weeks in that position; and on the Tropical Airplay chart, lasting 10 weeks in that position. The music video was released on July 18, 2017. It was directed by Carlos Pérez and won Best Bachata Video at the Videoclip Awards 2018. He released his third studio album titled Golden on July 21, 2017. It featured collaborations with Swizz Beatz, Juan Luis Guerra, Ozuna, Nicky Jam, Daddy Yankee, Julio Iglesias, and Jessie Reyez. This was his first studio album to not be part of the Formula series. It was nominated for Best Latin Album in the Billboard Music Awards 2018.

In February 2018, Santos would kick off the Golden Tour, which was the tour for the album Golden, the same way he did for The King Stays King tour in 2012. He once again sold out New York City's famous Madison Square Garden three nights in a row on the 15th, 16th, and 17th of that month. The tour would end in February 2019 with two nights at San Juan, Puerto Rico's José Miguel Agrelot Coliseum on the 8th and 9th of that month.

=== Utopía and Aventura reunion tour (2019–2021) ===
On April 5, 2019, he released his fourth studio album Utopía where he united with pioneers and legends of traditional modern bachata. El Chaval de la Bachata, Frank Reyes, Raulin Rodriguez, Elvis Martinez, Kiko Rodriguez, Teodoro Reyes, Joe Veras, Zacarias Ferreira, Luis Vargas, Monchy & Alexandra, and Anthony "El Mayimbe" Santos all participated in the album to show that unification within bachata is possible. The band Aventura, as a group, released an official song within this album titled "Inmortal". It was released as the lead single for the album. On the Billboard charts it peaked at 95 on the Billboard Hot 100, at number 5 on Hot Latin Songs, and at number 1 on both Latin and Tropical Airplays. Later on, the other songs from the album all got music videos with the exception of the song "Bellas".

On September 21, 2019, Romeo Santos sold out MetLife Stadium, making him the first Latin artist to do so. The concert was based on the album Utopía. It featured almost every bachata artist from the album, including the other members of Aventura. Each artist not only sang the songs from the album, but also got to sing one or two of their greatest hits. This concert celebrated the history of bachata. The concert also featured artists from other genres like Cardi B, Ozuna, and Wisin & Yandel. In the same year, Santos decided to do a tour around the Dominican Republic during November and December. These shows were free to watch and went to different towns and cities. On December 8, 2019, Romeo Santos posted a video saying that Aventura would go on tour around the United States in 2020 called Gira Inmortal (Inmortal Tour) They would eventually tour until the COVID-19 pandemic forced them to cancel. On July 22, 2020, he released the single, "Nuestro Amor" with Dominican singer, Alex Bueno. This song is a remix and a duet version of a one of Bueno's songs. The original solo version by Bueno was released back in 2007 as part of the studio album, Queda Algo. The duet version was supposedly planned to be part of Santos's fourth studio album, but was not added to it, thus being released as separate single a year later.

On June 25, 2021, a film based on the MetLife concert premiered on PPV and then on HBO Max on July 30, 2021. On August 3, 2021, Aventura released the song "Volví" with Bad Bunny. On August 20, 2021, he released a live version of the song "Inmortal". Taken from the MetLife concert film, it became a single for Santos's second live album, entitled Utopía Live from MetLife Stadium. The live album was released on September 10, 2021. It was named after the concert film released earlier that year. In 2021, he would return with the group to finish the tour. But instead of performing in the venues originally schedule, they would perform at stadiums instead. They performing 4 shows in the United States. These stadiums were the Hard Rock Stadium in Miami, Wrigley Field in Chicago, Dodger Stadium in Los Angeles, and at MetLife Stadium East Rutherford, New Jersey. They ended the tour with two nights at the Félix Sánchez Olympic Stadium in Santo Domingo, Dominican Republic on December 18 and 19, of 2021.

=== Formula, Vol. 3 (2022–2023) ===
On February 8, 2022, Romeo Santos announced that he would release a new album. It was first rumored, but then confirmed by Santos himself through YouTube and social media. It was also confirmed that it is part of the Formula series as this album is titled Formula, Vol. 3. Fans expected the third volume to have been his third studio album. However, his third studio album ended up being titled Golden and then Utopía for his fourth. After those two albums, fans never thought Fórmula would get a trilogy, until now. Its first single, Sus Huellas was released on Valentine's Day, February 14, 2022. It peaked at number 10 on the Billboard Hot Latin Songs chart. It also peaked at number 1 on the Billboard Latin and Tropical Airplay charts.

On July 22, 2022, Santos performed on NBC's Today as part of the Citi Summer Concert Series. He said that he was planning to release the album on September 1, 2022, which is on his first born son's birthday. He did not confirm at the time that it would be the official released date, but he said he was working on it. On August 15, 2022, he posted a teaser and confirmed that the official release date was going to be on the date he had mention at the concert series.

On September 1, 2022, Formula, Vol. 3 was released. It was released along with the music video for the single "Sin Fin" which featured American singer Justin Timberlake. His fans were confused when on that day at midnight the album wasn't available. Later in the morning, Santos announced on social media that the album would be released at 11pm, which was 23 hours after the expected release time. The album featured collaborations with Justin Timberlake, Rosalía, bachata veteran Luis Miguel Del Amargue, Christian Nodal, Chris Lebron, Lapiz Conciente, and Katt Williams. It also featured merengue legends Fernando Villalona, Rubby Pérez, Toño Rosario, and Ramon Orlando as they united for the song "15,500 Noches" ("15,500 Nights"). Santos included his manager Johnny Marines, requinto guitarist ChiChi, and producer MateTraxx for a skit which featured a special character. He also included his three sons in the intro along with Williams. Santos mentioned that one of the reasons this album is his most personal one is because of his sons being involved.

In February 2023, Santos started his Formula, Vol. 3 Tour with four sold-out shows at the National Stadium of Peru in Lima on the 10th, 11th, 12th, and 14th of that month. Santos would once again make history selling out four nights at a stadium with a capacity of over 43,000. This wasn't the only time in this tour that he sells out multiple nights in the same venue. In March 2023, he sold out nine nights at the Movistar Arena in Santiago, Chile. He performed from March 21 to the 30th every night except on the 27th. In May 2023, Romeo would once again make history in San Juan, Puerto Rico as he performed 2 nights at Hiram Bithorn Stadium on the 20th, and 21st of that month. He sold out all both nights in a stadium with a capacity of 35,000 for concerts.

On June 9, 2023, Santos performed at the home stadium of the New York Mets, Citi Field, in Queens, New York. He made history by becoming the first Latin act to sell-out the stadium. It featured DJ Mad as the opening act. The show included numerous Dominican artists like the new up and coming bachata singer El Nephew, urban music artist, Natti Natasha, and merengue veterans Fernando Villalona, Rubby Pérez, Toño Rosario, and Ramon Orlando. He performed his greatest hit songs and songs from Aventura as well. He ended the show with the songs Sus Huellas and Propuesta Indecente, and with the announcement that he will have a show in October 2023 at the world's most famous arena Madison Square Garden. However, he did not perform at MSG in October. Instead, he performed at the Barclays Center in Brooklyn, New York City, in front of a sold-out crowd on November 10, 2023. On November 16, 2023, Formula, Vol. 3 won Best Merengue/Bachata Album at the 2023 Latin Grammys, making it his first win in his career.

=== Aventura reunion tour and Better Late Than Never (2024–present) ===
On February 25, 2024, Romeo posted a social media story about something that he was going to post the next day. The next day, Romeo, along with the other members of the group, posted a video that indicated that they were back. The following day, they announced dates for their tour, Cerrando Ciclos, which is considered the group's final tour. On April 2, 2024, they released their first single since 2021 and first bachata song since 2019, "Brindo Con Agua". It was released under his cousin Henry's record label Hustlehard Entertainment LLC. It is also the fifth song and first single from the group in which Henry is the lead vocalist. This is the second Aventura song to be featured in one of the members solo projects instead of an album by the group as it is the eighth and lead single for Henry's upcoming sixth studio album, 2.0. The album was released on May 31, 2024.

On November 28, 2025, Santos released the surprise collaborative album Better Late Than Never with Prince Royce. The next month, the Mejor Tarde Que Nunca Tour was announced for 2026.

== Concert films and documentary ==
On November 6, 2012, The King Stays King: Sold Out at Madison Square Garden was released on DVD by HBO Latino. This is Santos's first concert film as a solo artist. It is based on his 3 night performance at Madison Square Garden in February 2012. It is currently available on HBO Max as Romeo Santos: The King Stays King–Live at Madison Square Garden. It featured performances by Anthony Santos, Luis Vargas, P. Diddy, Tomatito, Wisin & Yandel, and Usher. It included behind the scenes footage and clips of Santos talking about a few topics involving his life and career.

On June 25, 2021, Romeo Santos: Utopía Live from MetLife Stadium was released as a PPV event, based on the September 2019 concert in East Rutherford, New Jersey. Concurrently, a documentary on Santos premiered on the same day titled Romeo Santos: King of Bachata which traced the history of Bachata, and showed Santos travelling to the Dominican Republic with The Kid Mero. The documentary featured celebraties like Cardi B, Daddy Yankee, Emilio Estefan, Marc Anthony, Thalía and more. To promote the documentary, HBO built an elaborate pop-up promotion in Washington Heights, NYC in the form of a bodega, called House of Bachata, with free haircuts, Presidente beer, and karaoke parties honoring Santos. At its center was a PORTL "hologram" device in which Santos appeared in lifelike, lifesized, volumetric 4K to interact with fans. On July 30, 2021, both films were released on HBO Max.

== Artistry ==
=== Themes, genres, and musical style ===
Romeo, along with Lenny, Henry, and Max are the creators of the urban style of Bachata. As Los Tinellers, they started off as a traditional bachata group. In the late 1990, they would re-invent themselves as Aventura and started to add a more Americanized style to the genre. They mixed bachata with different kinds of genres like R&B, pop, hip-hop, reggae and rock. In 2011, when Romeo became a solo artist, he created his own style of bachata to separate his own music from the style he did with the group. His style is a more romantic mix of pop and contemporary R&B.

=== Influences ===
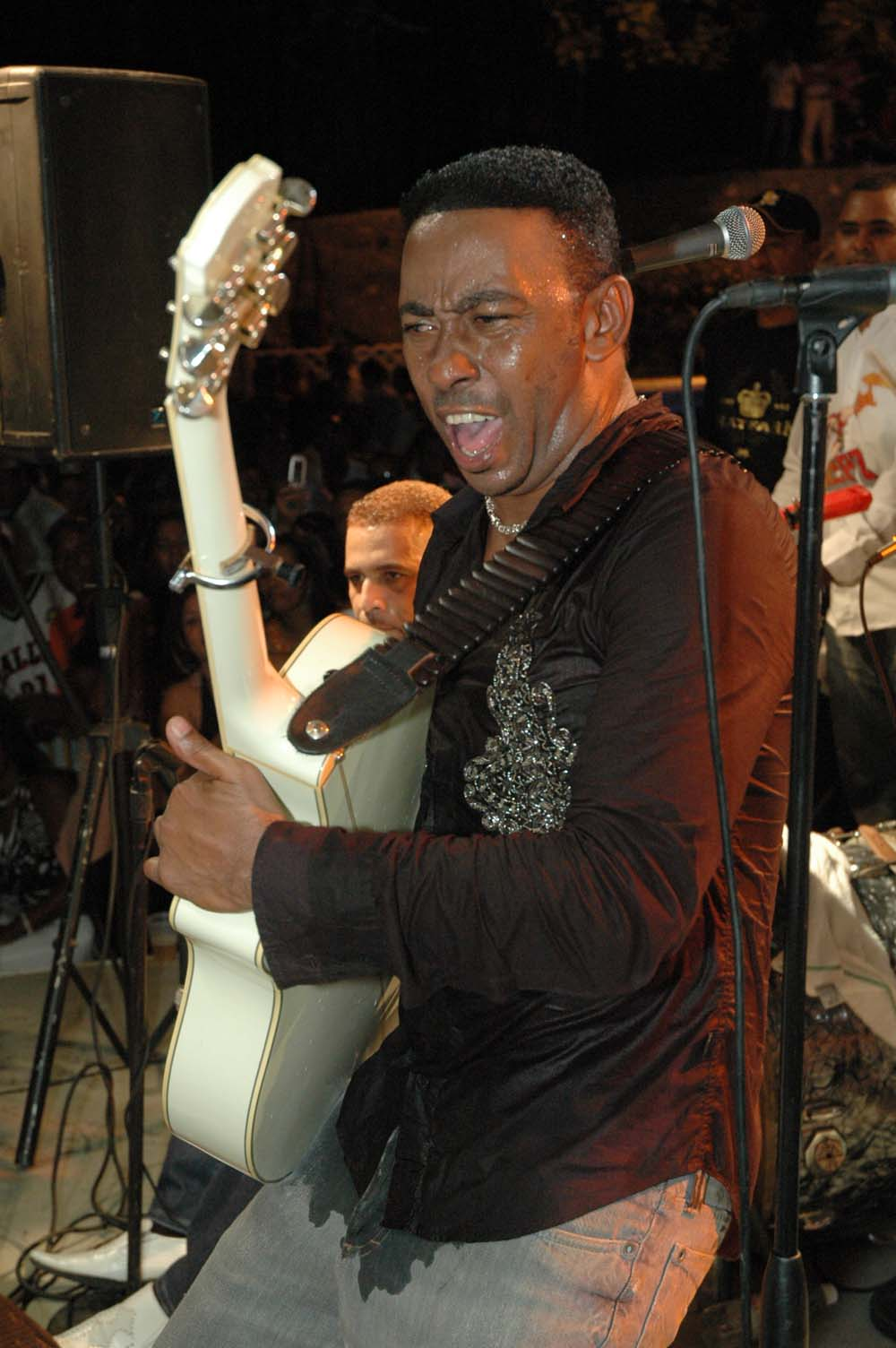
Santos has cited Anthony Santos (left) and Juan Luis Guerra (right) as two of his influences, especially in bachata.

Romeo Santos was inspired by many exponents of music to compose his songs, artists he has admitted having influence of or admiring them includes Shakira, Ricky Martin, Marc Anthony, Héctor Lavoe, Camilo Sesto, Rocío Dúrcal, Celia Cruz, Johnny Pacheco, Juan Gabriel, José José, Manuel Alejandro, Julio Iglesias, Fania All-Stars, and particularly within his genre are artists like Anthony Santos, Juan Luis Guerra, Luis Vargas, Raulín Rodríguez, and Frank Reyes.

Romeo Santos started in music when he was a teen. At first, he wasn't concentrating on bachata until one day his father bought an Anthony Santos cassette. Romeo saw the cassette and noticed that the artist had the same name as him. He played the cassette and immediately fell in love with his music. Thus, inspiring him to become a bachata singer.

== Acting career ==
Santos's first film appearance was in the 2007 Dominican film Sanky Panky as himself alongside his fellow band members from Aventura, performing live at Altos de Chavón in the Dominican Republic. In 2013, he appeared on an episode of the 44th season of Sesame Street. He sang a song titled "Quiero Ser Tu Amigo". It is a song about asking someone if they want to be their friend. Romeo Santos made his Hollywood debut in the film Furious 7, released April 2015, alongside Vin Diesel, Dwayne Johnson, and Paul Walker. He was nervous about acting in Furious 7 but the cast made him feel welcome. In 2016, Santos was the voice of the cartoon character Early Bird in the 2016 film The Angry Birds Movie.

== Legacy ==
Santos has been dubbed the "King of Modern Bachata" along with the other members of Aventura. The group revolutionized bachata and made it recognized world wide with a style that mixed the Dominican genre with American genres like R&B, Rock, Hip-Hop, Pop, ect. In his solo career, his success continued as he would collaborate with more mainstream artists and eventually feature some of them in bachata. His collaborations with Usher and Drake led to the songs Promise and Odio, both of them being certified Diamond by the Recording Industry Association of America (RIAA). Additionally, the song Propuesta Indecente is his best charted and most certified song of his solo career and career overall, as it was certified 86× Platinum, which is equal to it being certified 8× Diamond plus 6× platinum. Santos continued to break records by selling out Madison Square Garden three nights in a row in February of both 2011 and 2018, and Chile's Movistar Arena in March 2023. He has been the only bachata act to sell-out stadiums like the Félix Sánchez Olympic Stadium twice in Santo Domingo in 2012, Yankee Stadium twice in New York City in 2014, MetLife Stadium in New Jersey in 2019, National Stadium in Lima four nights in a row in February 2023, the Hiram Bithorn Stadium twice in Puerto Rico in May 2023 and more.

== Personal life ==
Santos has five children. He had his first son in 2002. Santos later said that he was scared at the time and ran away from the situation, and that he had found out about the child after he was born. Two years later, he became part of his son's life and has had an improved relationship since. Santos has three other sons and a daughter with his wife. He is married to Dominican influencer Francelys Infante, whom he has been with for more than a decade. Their relationship was kept a low profile until it became public in early 2023. She appeared in his music video of "Solo Conmigo" revealing that they were expecting their fourth child. Santos mentioned on social media that his fourth son's heartbeat was heard in the intro of his 2022 album Formula, Vol. 3. On his 43rd birthday, July 21, 2024, he posted a highlight on Instagram in which he showed his first daughter. This surprised fans because no announcement about her had been made prior to this.

== Discography ==
=== Solo discography ===
- Formula, Vol. 1 (2011)
- Formula, Vol. 2 (2014)
- Golden (2017)
- Utopía (2019)
- Formula, Vol. 3 (2022)

Collaborative studio albums

- Better Late Than Never (with Prince Royce) (2025)

=== Aventura discography ===
- Generation Next (1999)
- We Broke the Rules (2002)
- Love & Hate (2003)
- God's Project (2005)
- The Last (2009)

== Tours ==
Solo

- The King Stays King (2012–2013)
- Fórmula, Vol. 2 Tour (2014–2016)
- Golden Tour (2018–2019)
- Utopía Tour (2019)
- Fórmula, Vol. 3: La Gira (2023)

Co-headlining

- Mejor Tarde Que Nunca (with Prince Royce ) (2026)

== Filmography ==
=== Live concerts ===
- The King Stays King: Sold Out at Madison Square Garden (2012)
- Utopía Live from MetLife Stadium (2021)

=== Documentary ===
- Romeo Santos: King of Bachata (2021)

=== Movies ===
Year	Title	Role	Notes
2007	Sanky Panky	Himself with Aventura	Cameo
2015	Furious 7	Armando (Mando)	Cameo
2016	The Angry Birds Movie	The Early Bird	Cameo

== See also ==
- List of Afro-Latinos
- List of best-selling Latin music artists
