= Te Regalo el Mar (disambiguation) =

Te Regalo el Mar is a 2007 album by Frank Reyes

Te Regalo el Mar may also refer to:

- "Te Regalo el Mar", 2007 song by Frank Reyes
- "Te Regalo el Mar", 2013 song by Prince Royce from the album Soy el Mismo
