= Mi Historia Musical =

Mi Historia Musical may refer to:

- Mi Historia Musical (Jaci Velasquez album), 2004
- Mi Historia Musical (Juan Gabriel album), 2016
- Mi Historia Musical, Vol. 1, a 2023 album by Frank Reyes
  - Mi Historia Musical, Vol. 2, the follow-up released in the same year
- Mi Historia Musical, a 2017 album by Aventura
- Mi Historia Musical, a 2008 album by Daniel Santos
- Mi Historia Musical, a 2004 album by Duelo
- Mi Historia Musical, a 2005 album by Emmanuel
- Mi Historia Musical, a 2008 album by Felipe Pirela
- Mi Historia Musical, a 1986 album by Frankie Ruiz
- Mi Historia Musical, a 2004 album by Jerry Rivera
- Mi Historia Musical, a 2016 album by Joan Sebastian
- Mi Historia Musical, a 2016 album by José José
- Mi Historia Musical, a 2005 album by Leonardo Paniagua
- Mi Historia Musical, a 2016 album by Redimi2
- Mi Historia Musical, a 2005 album by Rey Ruiz
- Mi Historia Musical, a 1992 album by Rudy La Scala
- Mi Historia Musical, a 2017 album by Silvestre Dangond
- Mi Historia Musical 20 Corridos, a 2010 album by Beto Quintanilla
- Mi Historia Musical – The Classic Years, a 2017 album by Celia Cruz

== See also ==
- Historia Musical de Alfredo Gutiérrez, a 2002 album by Alfredo Gutiérrez
