= Princesa (song) =

2006 single by with Frank Reyes

Single by Frank Reyes

from the album Dosis De Amor
- Released: 2006
- Recorded: 2005
- Genre: Bachata
- Length: 3:25
- Label: J & N Records; JVN Musical Inc.
- Songwriter: Félix Antonio Mirabal

Frank Reyes singles chronology
"Dosis De Amor" (2005)	"Princesa" (2006)	"Pienso En Ti" (2006)

Music video
- "Princesa" on YouTube

Alternative Cover
- "Princesa" re-edition cover

"Princesa" (Princess) is a song by Dominican singer-songwriter Frank Reyes. It was originally released as the fifth track for his twelfth studio album, Dosis De Amor on December 20, 2005, by J & N Records and JVN Musical Inc. It was then released in 2006 as the third single of the album. The song peaked at number 1 on the Billboard Tropical Airplay chart, thus becoming Reyes' first number 1 hit on a Billboard charts. The song won Bachata of the Year at the 2007 Casandra Awards.

== Charts ==
Chart (2006)	Peak position
US Tropical Songs (Billboard)	1
