= Inmortal Tour =

2020 concert tour by Aventura

- Tour by Aventura
- Start date: February 5, 2020
- End date: December 19, 2021
- Legs: 2
- No. of shows: 39; 21 Performed; 18 Cancelled
- Attendance: 429,787
- Box office: US $50,853,453

Aventura concert chronology
- Aventura Reunion In NYC (2016); Inmortal Tour (2020–2021); Cerrando Ciclos (2024)

Inmortal Tour was a reunion world tour by the bachata group Aventura. The name of the tour references their reunion hit and lead single by the main singer Romeo Santos, "Inmortal". It was their first tour in 10 years since The Last Tour and their first reunion concerts since the 2016 concerts in the United Palace.

The tour was commercially successful and sold out in just minutes. Initially only seven dates were announced but due to high demand more shows were added. The first 14 shows in the United States earned US$23.1 million from 176,931 tickets sold and Billboard predicted that the North American leg could reach $50 million in ticket sales.

On March 12, 2020, the group announced via their social networks that they had to postpone their second concert in Miami and stated "After the recent announcement from the Miami mayor, Aventura's sold-out concert tonight at American Airlines was postponed. After that, they decided to postpone their concerts to July and August. However, all remaining concerts were cancelled due the COVID-19 pandemic.

In 2021, the group had announced that they would return on tour. However, instead of doing the shows at the originally planned venues, they decided to perform five stadium shows to complete their tour in the United States. Only four were done as for some unknown reason they had cancelled one of them. In December 2021, they had their last two concerts together at the Félix Sánchez Olympic Stadium in Santo Domingo, Dominican Republic.

== Background ==
On April 5, 2019, the band reunited and released the track "Inmortal" by surprise as a lead single of Santos' fourth studio album Utopía. It was their first song together in 10 years. On September 21, 2019, Santos performed a concert at the Metlife Stadium to promote the album where Aventura were invited. The concert broke attendance records with 80,000 tickets sold. On December 9, 2019, the band announced their first U.S. tour in 10 years. Initial plans were for seven shows in seven different cities. However, due to the high demand for tickets, more shows and cities were added.

== Tour dates ==
List of concerts, showing date, city, country, venue, opening acts, tickets sold, number of available tickets, and grossing revenue
Date	City	Country	Venue	Attendance	Revenue
North America
February 5, 2020	Inglewood	United States	The Forum	52,162 / 52,162	$7,131,966
February 6, 2020	Inglewood	United States	The Forum	52,162 / 52,162	$7,131,966
February 7, 2020	Inglewood	United States	The Forum	52,162 / 52,162	$7,131,966
February 8, 2020	Inglewood	United States	The Forum	52,162 / 52,162	$7,131,966
February 13, 2020	Dallas	United States	American Airlines Center	12,936 / 12,936	$1,920,593
February 14, 2020	Houston	United States	Toyota Center	22,734 / 22,734	$3,308,230
February 22, 2020	Houston	United States	Toyota Center	22,734 / 22,734	$3,308,230
February 27, 2020	Chicago	United States	United Center	40,442 / 40,442	$5,499,944
February 28, 2020	Chicago	United States	United Center	40,442 / 40,442	$5,499,944
February 29, 2020	Chicago	United States	United Center	40,442 / 40,442	$5,499,944
March 1, 2020	Boston	United States	TD Garden	22,605 / 22,605	$3,022,752
March 2, 2020	Boston	United States	TD Garden	22,605 / 22,605	$3,022,752
March 3, 2020	Washington, D.C.	United States	Capital One Arena	26,062 / 26,062	$3,220,180
March 5, 2020	Washington, D.C.	United States	Capital One Arena	26,062 / 26,062	$3,220,180
March 10, 2020	Miami	United States	American Airlines Arena	12,504 / 12,504	$1,661,700
Total				188,805 / 188,805	$25,765,365

== Cancelled shows ==
List of cancelled concerts, showing date, city, country, venue, and reason for cancellation
Date	City	Country	Venue	Reason
North America
July 8, 2020	New York City	United States	Radio City Music Hall	COVID-19 pandemic
July 9, 2020	New York City	United States	Radio City Music Hall	COVID-19 pandemic
July 10, 2020	New York City	United States	Radio City Music Hall	COVID-19 pandemic
July 11, 2020	New York City	United States	Radio City Music Hall	COVID-19 pandemic
July 12, 2020	New York City	United States	Radio City Music Hall	COVID-19 pandemic
July 17, 2020	Montreal	Canada	Bell Centre	COVID-19 pandemic
July 19, 2020	Toronto	Canada	Scotiabank Arena	COVID-19 pandemic
July 22, 2020	Greensboro	United States	Greensboro Coliseum Complex	COVID-19 pandemic
July 24, 2020	Miami	United States	American Airlines Arena	COVID-19 pandemic
July 25, 2020	Sunrise	United States	BB&T Center	COVID-19 pandemic
July 28, 2020	Atlanta	United States	State Farm Arena	COVID-19 pandemic
August 1, 2020	Dallas	United States	American Airlines Center	COVID-19 pandemic
August 7, 2020	San Diego	United States	Viejas Arena	COVID-19 pandemic
August 8, 2020	Oakland	United States	Oakland Arena	COVID-19 pandemic
August 14, 2020	Anaheim	United States	Honda Center	COVID-19 pandemic
August 15, 2020	Las Vegas	United States	T-Mobile Arena	COVID-19 pandemic
August 16, 2020	San Jose	United States	SAP Center	COVID-19 pandemic

- Some of these dates may not be the original dates as some shows were at first postpone until it was later announced that it was canceled which then made changes to their 2021 tour.

== Stadium Tour dates ==
When all the shows from 2020 got canceled, Aventura decided to make a few show at stadiums to finish their reunion tour. It was even renamed as the Inmortal Stadium Tour.

List of concerts, showing date, city, country, and venue
Date	City	Country	Venue	Attendance	Revenue
North America
August 14, 2021	Miami Gardens	United States	Hard Rock Stadium	40,538 / 40,538	$6,017,014
August 29, 2021	Chicago	United States	Wrigley Field	27,924 / 27,924	$2,530,617
September 5, 2021	Los Angeles	United States	Dodger Stadium	44,193 / 44,193	$4,860,568
October 9, 2021	East Rutherford	United States	MetLife Stadium	48,327 / 48,327	$7,339,642
Latin America
December 18, 2021	Santo Domingo	Dominican Republic	Félix Sánchez Olympic Stadium	80,000 / 80,000	$4,340,247
December 19, 2021	Santo Domingo	Dominican Republic	Félix Sánchez Olympic Stadium	80,000 / 80,000	$4,340,247
Total				240,982 / 240,982	$25,088,088

Cancelled Shows

List of cancelled concerts, showing date, city, country, venue, and reason for cancellation
Date	City	Country	Venue	Reason
North America
October 14th, 2021	Arlington	United States	Globe Life Field	Unknown

- Originally it was scheduled for August 22, 2021. However, it was postpone and later cancelled with no explanation given.
