= Descarada =

Studio album by Frank Reyes
- Released: February 14, 2025
- Recorded: 2023–2024
- Genre: Bachata
- Length: 46:13
- Label: Frank Reyes & Associates

Frank Reyes chronology
Mi Historia Musical, Vol. 4 (2024)	Descarada (2025)

Singles from Descarada
- 1. "Papá" Released: May 30, 2024; 2. "Mejor Que a Ti Me Va" Released: November 15, 2024; 3. "Quién Te Dio El Derecho" Released: June 5, 2025; 4. "El Tubi" Released: September 25, 2025

Descarada (Shameless) is the twentieth studio album by Dominican singer Frank Reyes. It was released on Valentine's Day, 2025. The album is supported by the singles "Papá", "Mejor Que a Ti Me Va", "Quién Te Dio El Derecho", and "El Tubi".

== Track listing ==
No.	Title	Length
1.	"Quién Te Dio El Derecho"	3:19
2.	"Traicionar Es Bueno Pero Es Pecado"	3:05
3.	"Punto Final"	3:25
4.	"Abrazándonos"	3:14
5.	"Descarada"	3:40
6.	"Vivo Y Muero En Tu Piel"	3:48
7.	"Vuelve Mi Amor"	3:18
8.	"El Tubi"	3:43
9.	"Primera Cita"	2:52
10.	"Señor Jesus"	3:55
11.	"No Te Vayas Así"	4:15
12.	"Papá"	4:26
13.	"Mejor Que a Ti Me Va"	3:32
Total length:		46:13
