= MetLife Stadium =

Stadium in East Rutherford, New Jersey

- The Meadowlands; The New Meadowlands

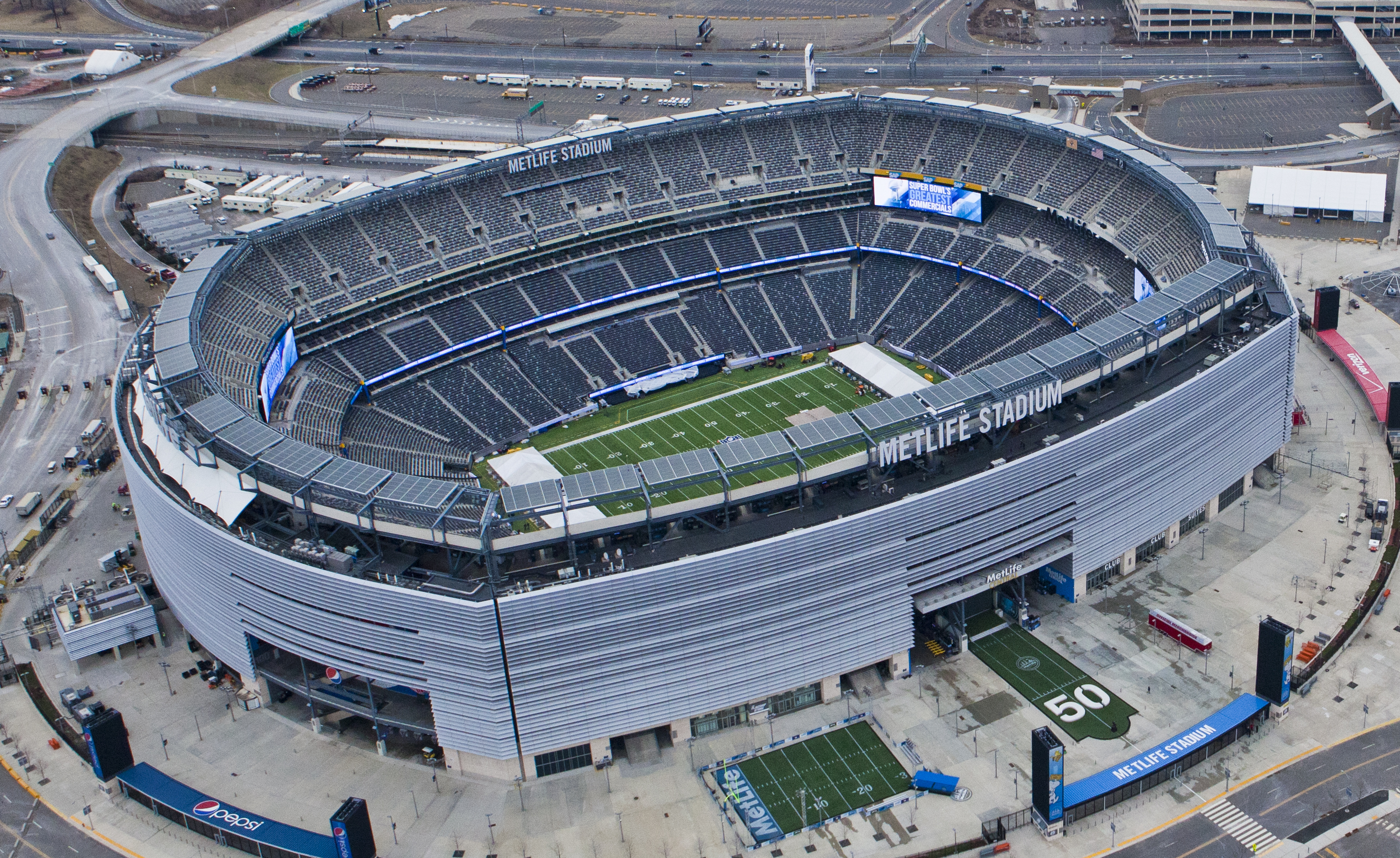
- Aerial view from northwest in 2014

- Location near New York City Location in New Jersey Location in the United States
- Former names: New Meadowlands Stadium (2010–2011); New York New Jersey Stadium (2026 FIFA World Cup)
- Address: 1 MetLife Stadium Drive
- Location: East Rutherford, New Jersey, U.S.
- Coordinates: 40°48′49″N 74°4′28″W
- Elevation: 7 feet (2 m) AMSL
- Owner: New Jersey Sports and Exposition Authority
- Operator: New Meadowlands Stadium Company, LLC
- Capacity: 82,500; 80,663 (2026 FIFA World Cup)
- Surface: UBU Speed S5-M (2010–2022); FieldTurf CORE (2023–present)
- Screens: Four 30 ft × 118 ft (9 m × 36 m) big-screen monitors One 360 degree ribbon board display
- Record attendance: 93,000 (12th Siyum HaShas, August 1, 2012); Professional wrestling: 113,722 (SummerSlam, August 2 and 3, 2025); Concert: 89,106 (Ed Sheeran +-=÷x Tour, June 11, 2023); American Football: 83,367 (New York Jets @ New York Giants, October 29, 2023); College football: 82,285 (122nd Army–Navy Game, December 11, 2021); Soccer: 82,566 (Manchester United vs. West Ham United, July 26, 2025)
- Public transit: Meadowlands Meadowlands Rail Line NJT Bus: 353 Coach USA: 351

Construction
- Groundbreaking: September 5, 2007
- Built: 2008–2010
- Opened: April 10, 2010; 16 years ago
- Cost: $1.6 billion ($2.36 billion in 2025 dollars)
- Architects: 360 Architecture; EwingCole; Rockwell Group; Bruce Mau Design, Inc.
- Project manager: Hammes Company Sports Development
- Structural engineer: Thornton Tomasetti
- General contractor: Skanska
- Main contractor: Structal–Heavy Steel Construction

Tenants
- New York Giants (NFL) (2010–present); New York Jets (NFL) (2010–present); New York Guardians (XFL) (2020)

Website
- metlifestadium.com

MetLife Stadium is a multi-purpose stadium located at the Meadowlands Sports Complex in East Rutherford, New Jersey, five miles (8 km) west of New York City. Opened in 2010, it replaced Giants Stadium and serves as the home for the New York Giants and New York Jets of the National Football League (NFL). At an approximate cost of $1.6 billion, it was the most expensive stadium built in the U.S. at the time of its completion. It is the largest stadium in New Jersey and the New York metro area with a capacity of over 82,000, and is the largest venue in the NFL.

MetLife hosted Super Bowl XLVIII in February 2014. It also hosted nine matches during the 2025 FIFA Club World Cup, including the final, and hosted eight matches during the 2026 FIFA World Cup, including its final. During the 2026 FIFA World Cup, the stadium was temporarily renamed New York New Jersey Stadium.

MetLife Stadium is one of two stadiums shared by two NFL teams; the other is SoFi Stadium in Inglewood, California, home to the Los Angeles Rams and Los Angeles Chargers. Additionally, MetLife Stadium is the fifth building in the New York metropolitan area to be home to multiple teams from the same sports league, after the Polo Grounds, which was home to the baseball Giants and Yankees from 1913 to 1922; the third Madison Square Garden, which hosted the NHL's Rangers and Americans from 1926 to 1942; Shea Stadium, which housed both the Mets and Yankees during the 1974 and 1975 seasons and both the Jets and Giants in 1975; and Giants Stadium, which hosted both the Giants and Jets from 1984 to 2009.

== History ==
As Giants Stadium approached 30 years of age, it was becoming one of the older stadiums in the NFL. The Jets, who had been the tenants to the Giants, were looking to have their proposed West Side Stadium built in Manhattan. Originally intended to be the 85,000-seat main stadium for New York's bid for the 2012 Summer Olympics, it was designed to be downsized to 75,000 seats for the Jets. However, it would have required significant public funding; progress on the project was halted in 2005 due to opposition from a number of sources, including Cablevision, who then owned the nearby Madison Square Garden. The Giants then entered into a joint venture with the Jets to build a new stadium in which the two New York teams would be equal partners.

== Design and planning ==
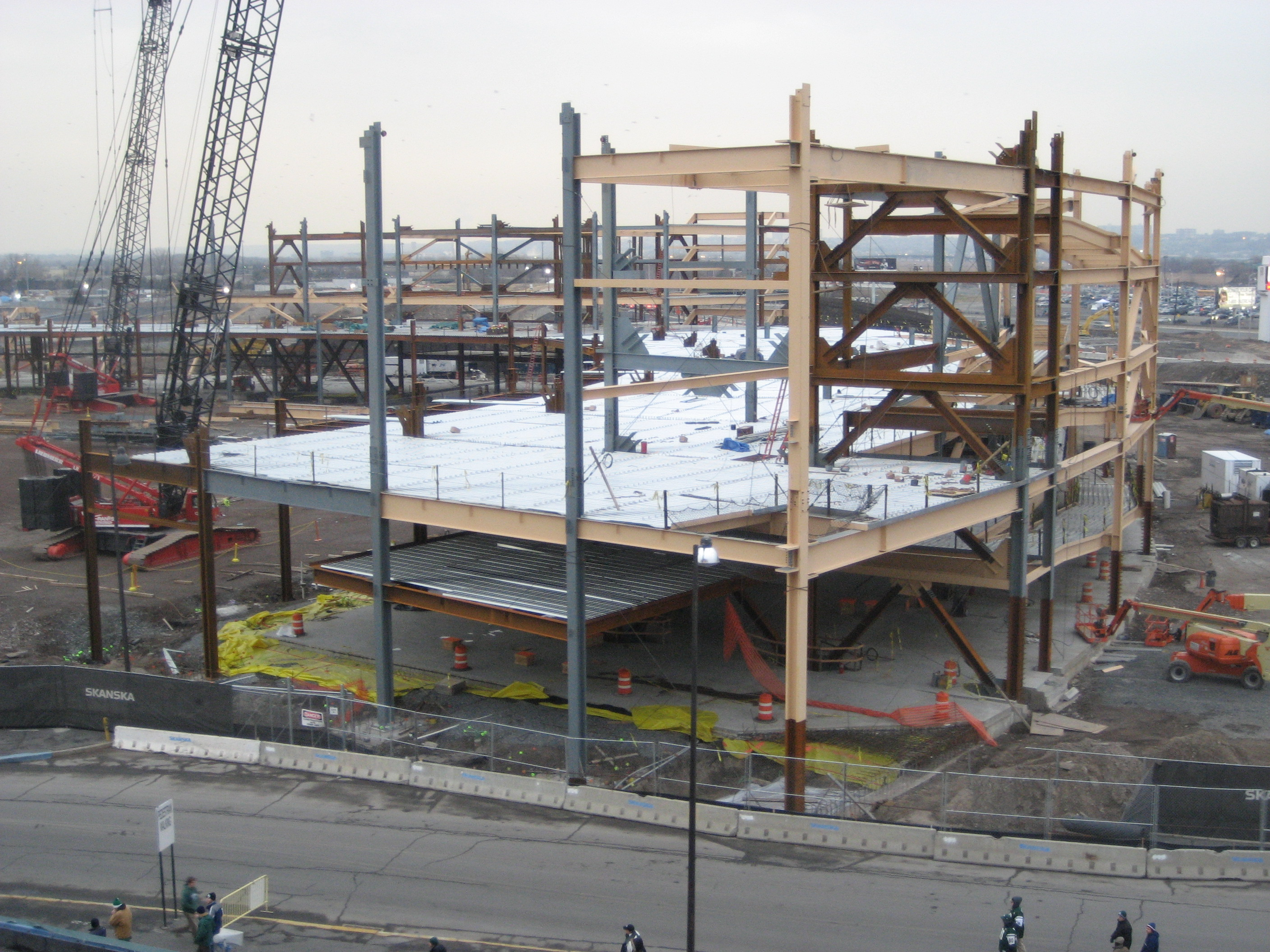
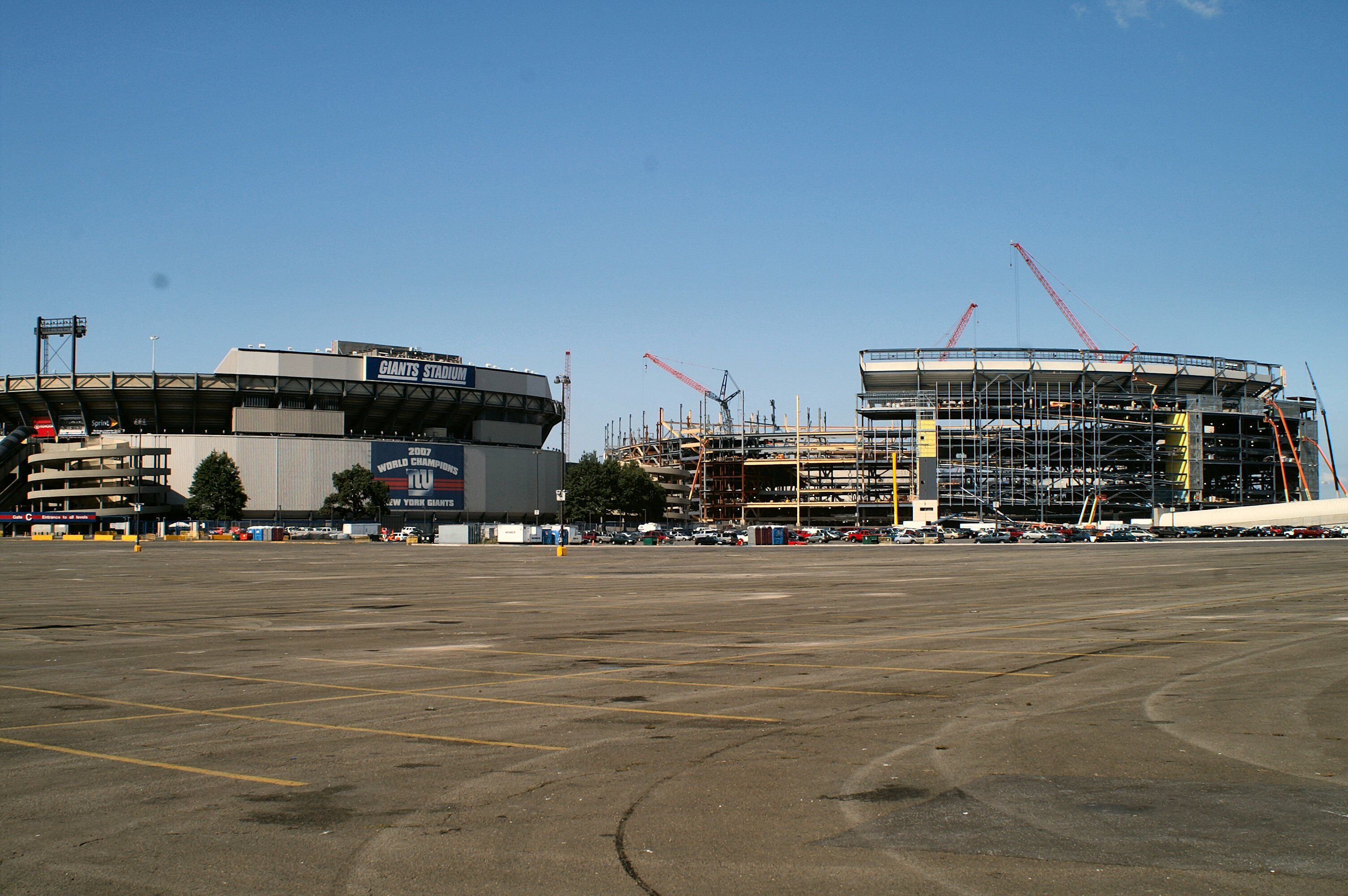
MetLife Stadium under construction in 2007 (top) and 2008 (bottom) near Giants Stadium

The architects were tasked with designing a neutral stadium that would still embody the distinct personalities of both franchises. The Giants favored a traditional look of exposed steel framework and rusticated stone while the Jets wanted a sleek and modern look highlighted by metal and glass. With those features in mind the designers used the column/tower dynamic seen in many of Manhattan's skyscrapers as inspiration for the stadium's design.

The base of the stadium's facade is clad in limestone-like stonework while the rest of the stadium is distinguished by an outer skin of aluminum louvers and glass and by interior lighting capable of switching colors, depending on which team is currently playing–blue for the Giants and green for the Jets. This idea originated at the Allianz Arena in Munich, Germany, which was previously shared between the city's two major soccer clubs, Bayern Munich and 1860 Munich. Unlike Giants Stadium, MetLife Stadium can easily be reconfigured for the Giants or Jets within a matter of hours. The louvers' total linear length is exactly 50,000 meters (50 kilometers) or 163,681 feet (31.1 miles).

To change the field decorations, two 4-person crews take approximately 18 hours using forklifts and other machinery to remove the 40 sections of Act Global UBU Speed Series which make up the teams' respective end zones. Replaceable team logos at midfield were removed in August 2010, after Domenik Hixon tore his anterior cruciate ligament at a practice at the stadium during training camp. For the next decade, the NFL's logo was painted at midfield, instead of the logo of one of the teams, also shortening the transition time. However, in 2023, the Giants announced they would paint their team logo at midfield during their home games, with the Jets likewise taking the same approach. The paint is formulated to be easily dissolved by water to ensure it can be quickly removed, and as such it is not expected to be used when precipitation is expected. If the two teams are playing each other, the designated home team will have its configuration around the stadium. During their annual preseason matchups, both the Giants and the Jets will have an end zone with their team logo. Additionally in 2023, the stadium installed a new artificial surface called the FieldTurf Core System, the first multilayer dual-polymer monofilament fiber surface. The new surface also contains heavyweight infill. Overall, the system should be more durable and lower incidences of player injury.

Unlike a number of other new NFL venues, MetLife Stadium does not have a roof, as proposals to include a roof failed over a dispute for funding. Thus, indoor events such as the Final Four cannot be held at the facility, which runs counter to the original aims for the stadium.

Ten giant HD-ready light emitting diode (LED) pylons, located at the north, south, east, and west entrances, display videos of the team currently in-house. The pylons measure approximately 54 feet (16 m) high by 20 feet (6.1 m) wide. The west entrance features a 400 feet (120 m) long and 40 feet (12 m) "Great Wall" that can rotate to display photographic murals of the Giants and Jets on game days and customized images for concerts and other events. Inside, are four 30 feet (9.1 m) by 116 feet (35 m) HD video displays, and hang from each corner of the upper deck. In 2025, the four corner video boards were upgraded with 8MM high-resolution LED boards along with a new stadium wide audio system featuring over 1,000 new speakers in the seating bowl.

The new stadium seating bowl is laid out similar to that of Giants Stadium and has seating for 82,500 people, including 10,005 club seats and approximately 218 luxury suites, making it the largest NFL stadium in terms of total seating. The seating bowl is also raked in a way that eliminates overhangs from the upper decks that would impede views and allows fans to see the full arc of a 90-foot (30 yd) punt.

Lower bowl	Mid-bowl	Upper bowl
33,346	21,323	27,897

MetLife Stadium includes a total of four locker rooms: one each for the Giants and Jets, as well as two for visiting teams. The home teams have locker rooms on opposite ends of the stadium with a visitors' locker room adjacent to it. On most game days the visitors use the locker room at the end opposite that of the home team while the unused visitors' locker room is used for spillover by the home team. For games in which neither the Giants or Jets are playing, each team uses one of the visitor's locker rooms. When the Giants and Jets play each other, each team uses its own locker room plus the adjacent visitor's room for spillover.

In 2012, DLR Group partnered with NRG Energy to design and install a "solar ring" on the upper rim of MetLife Stadium. The solar ring consists of 1,350 building-integrated photovoltaic (BIPV) solar panels assembled into 47 individual frames. The BIPV panels are illuminated with LED lighting and programmed to display the signature blue and green colors of the Giants and the Jets along with other hues for events such as concerts, soccer matches, and college sports. The panels generate about 350 KW, nearly 25 times the amount of electricity that's actually needed to power the LED display system. The excess power generated can go into general stadium use or back to the grid.

In January 2024, renovations began on the lower bowl of MetLife Stadium to enlarge the playing field to meet necessary FIFA requirements to host the eight games, including the final, of the 2026 FIFA World Cup. To limit disruption of regular stadium usage, the project is being done in two phases. Phase I was completed in May 2024 and Phase II was completed in May 2025.

To expand the field's dimensions for the tournament and maintain the current NFL seating capacity and layout, four corners of the existing precast concrete seating bowl were demolished and replaced with a new modular steel composite seating system that includes related mechanical, electrical, audio visual and plumbing adjustments. An additional 1,740 permanent seats were also replaced with the new seating system.

== Technical agreements ==
=== Lease terms ===
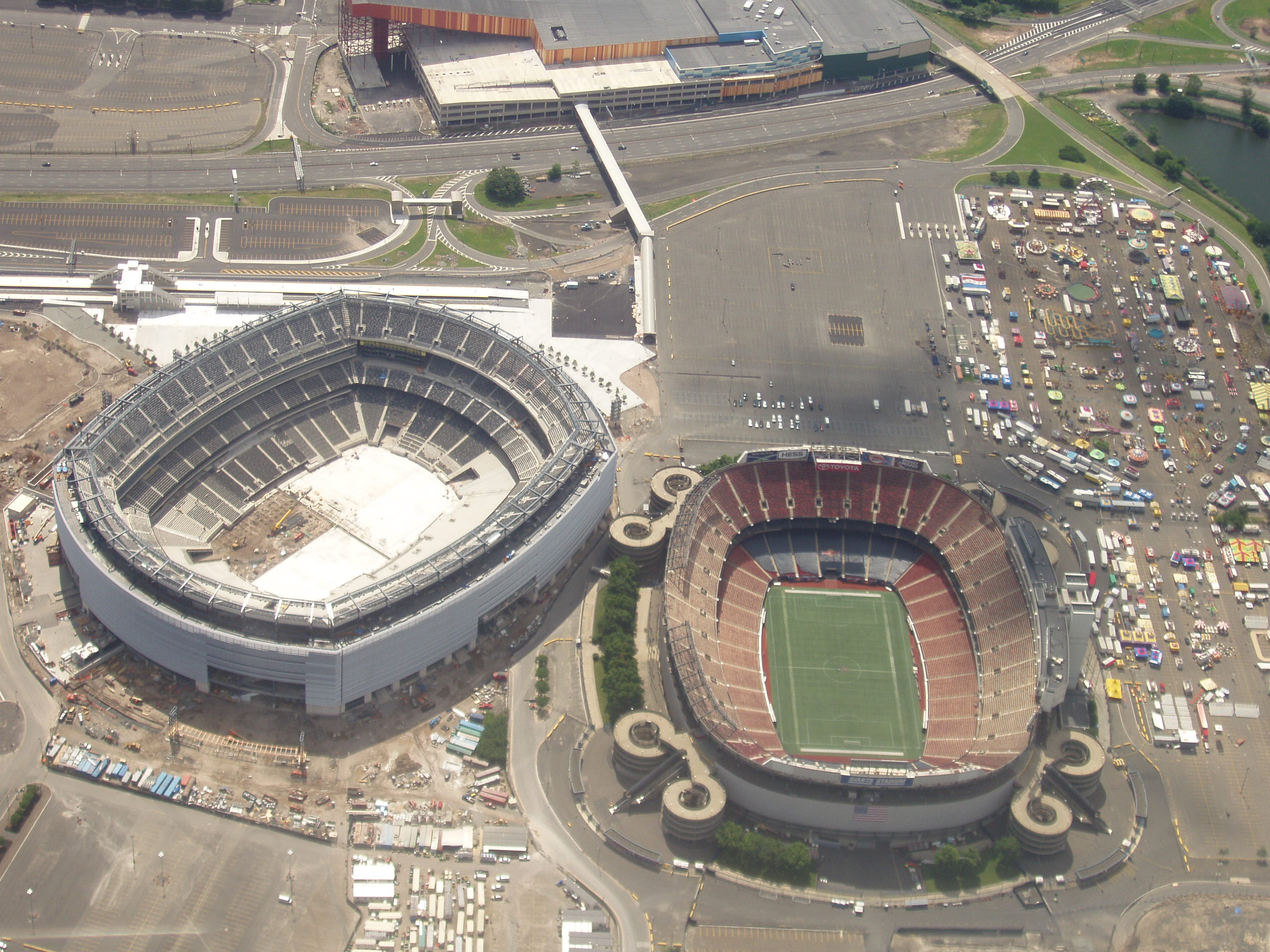
View of MetLife Stadium (under construction) and Giants Stadium (on right) in July 2009

The Giants and the Jets formed the New Meadowlands Stadium Company, LLC, a 50/50 joint venture, to build and operate the stadium. The two teams leased the parcel of land on which the stadium stands from the NJSEA for a 25-year term, with options to extend it which could eventually reach 97 years. After the 15th year of the lease and every five years hence, one of the two teams may opt out of the lease after giving the state 12 months notice. The first such opportunity to opt out will occur in 2025 with a notice date of 2024. There will then be an opportunity to opt out in 2030, 2035, 2040, etc. However, if one team leaves for a new stadium, the other team would have to remain for the remainder of the lease. However, the high cost of building and relocating to a stadium makes it very unlikely. The teams also get parking revenue from the Meadowlands' western parking lots year round, even when there are no events at the stadium (this would occur when other parts of the Meadowlands host events).

=== Naming rights ===
Allianz, a financial services and insurance company based in Munich, Germany, expressed interest in purchasing naming rights to the stadium. The proposal was for a period of up to 30 years, and was estimated to be valued at between $20 million and US$30 million. Allianz sponsors the venue that inspired the color-change technology for MetLife Stadium: Allianz Arena in Munich.

Allianz's proposal drew protests from New York's Jewish community (the largest outside of Israel) and the Anti-Defamation League, due to Allianz previous close ties to the government of Nazi Germany during World War II. Rabbi Jay Rosenbaum, secretary general of the North American Board of Rabbis, noted however that while the survivors' sensibilities were understandable, a naming deal is legitimate, noting "I have found Allianz to be receptive, to be sensitive and a friend of the Jewish people today." No agreement was reached and talks between Allianz and the teams ended on September 12, 2008.

In a 25-year deal signed on August 23, 2011, New York City-based insurance company MetLife purchased naming rights to the stadium, which became MetLife Stadium.

=== EPA agreement ===
In June 2009, the New Meadowlands Stadium Corporation and the EPA signed a memorandum of understanding that outlines plans to incorporate environmentally-friendly materials and practices into the construction and operation of MetLife Stadium. The agreement includes strategies to reduce air pollution, conserve water, and energy, improve waste management, and reduce the environmental impact of construction. The goal of the agreement is to save the emission of nearly 1.68 million metric tons of carbon dioxide during the stadium's construction and its first year of operation. Under this agreement, the stadium construction must use around 40,000 tons of recycled steel, recycle 20,000 tons of steel from Giants Stadium, install seating made from recycled plastic and scrap iron, and reduce air pollution from construction vehicles by using cleaner diesel fuel, diesel engine filters, and minimizing engine idle times. Other goals of this agreement include providing mass transit options for fans and replacing traditional concession plates, cups and carries with compostable alternatives. The New Meadowlands Stadium Corporation is to report the progress on its goals to EPA every six months. Based on the reports, the EPA has stated it will quantify the benefits of the venue's environmental efforts.

== Accessibility and transportation ==
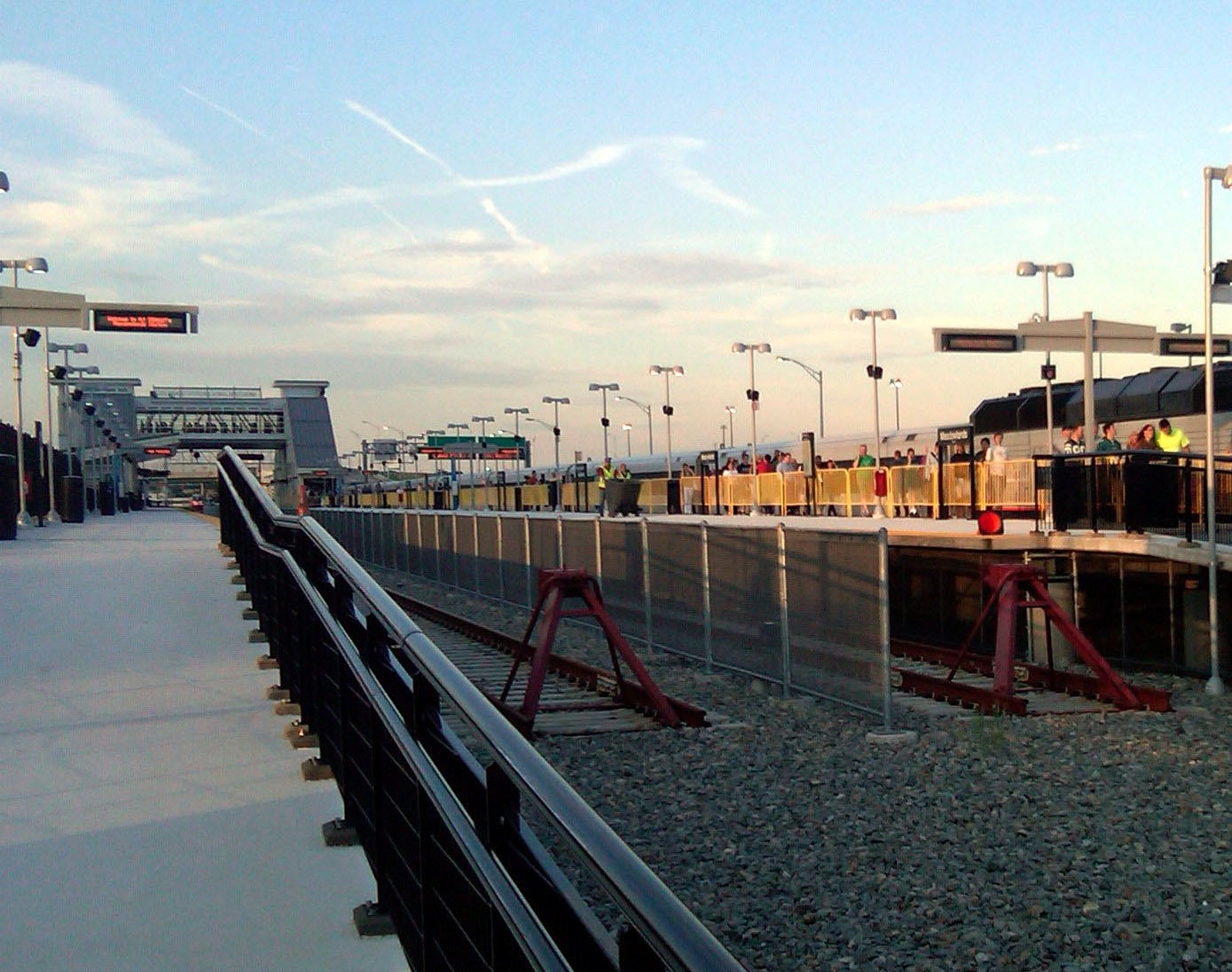
Meadowlands station provides New Jersey Transit rail service to MetLife Stadium on game days

MetLife Stadium is accessible by car via Exits 16W and 19W on the western spur of the New Jersey Turnpike (I-95) and is also located adjacent to NJ Route 3 and NJ Route 120.

Coach USA provides the 351 Meadowlands Express Bus service between MetLife Stadium and the Port Authority Bus Terminal. New Jersey Transit provides the 353 Bus service for select events between MetLife Stadium and Secaucus Junction. In 2026, NJ Transit opened the Transitway, a dedicated bus rapid transit (BRT) route for articulated buses from Secaucus Junction to MetLife Stadium.

The Meadowlands Rail Line operates on event days between Meadowlands station and Hoboken Terminal via Secaucus Junction, where there is connecting service to New York Penn Station, Newark Penn Station, and other New Jersey Transit rail operations. The line opened to the public on July 26, 2009.

MetLife Stadium enforces a clear bag policy, allowing only transparent bags no larger than 12”x6”x12” and small clutches of 4.5”x6.5”, with exceptions for medically necessary items after inspection.

== Criticism ==
Since its opening in 2010, MetLife Stadium has attracted criticism related to its design, playing surface and its accessibility.

=== Playing surface ===
Metlife Stadium’s playing surface has been criticized by NFL players due to frequent injuries that occur. Both the Giants and Jets have seen their players injured often on the field. Aaron Rodgers once suffered a torn Achilles at the stadium during his first regular season game with the Jets, after previously being on the Packers his entire prior career. Jaelan Phillips, Andrew Thomas and Malik Nabers have also suffered serious injuries at the stadium. MetLife Stadium has consistently ranked as having one of the worst playing surfaces in the NFL as a result. Green Bay Packers coach Matt LaFleur complained about the playing surface after Josh Jacobs suffered a knee contusion during a game at MetLife Stadium. Despite these criticisms, NFL officials have insisted that the playing surface is safe. During the 2026 FIFA World Cup, the stadiums playing surface continued to elicit criticism despite the installation of a grass surface. France manager Didier Deschamps criticized the playing surface stating “The pitch in New York was really tough — it took a lot out of the players’ muscles.” Midfielder Adrien Rabiot said that it “seemed more like an artificial pitch” and described it as “hard and rigid.” Vinicius Junior of Brazil complained that the grass dried out quickly due to heat. Following this criticism, FIFA downplayed these concerns. Ahead of the 2026 FIFA World Cup final, these concerns were reiterated with players and coaches raising concerns about the condition of the pitch. The playing surface for soccer at the stadium had been a going concern since the 2025 FIFA Club World Cup. Due to these concerns, the selection of MetLife Stadium to host the final had been questioned, considering that other venues have been better received by players and coaches.

=== Transit access ===
Transit access to MetLife Stadium has been a subject of discussion concerning the stadium. At Super Bowl XLVIII in 2014, spectators waited hours to get to and from MetLife Stadium, with many struggling to get to and from the venue. Dubbed as a “Mass Transit Super Bowl”, transit access to the stadium was deemed to be a logistical failure. During the 2026 FIFA World Cup, the location of the stadium was the subject of criticism due to the slow pace of transporting people out of the Meadowlands following the conclusion of games. Three hours after the stadium's first World Cup game concluded, spectators were still stuck at MetLife Stadium with ridesharing companies struggling to move spectators. These challenges occurred due to less than expected demand for taking New Jersey Transit train and bus service to the stadium, although following the conclusion of the World Cup, the agency reported that they set an overall ridership volume record over the eight games held at the stadium, and deemed it a logistical success in contrast to the Super Bowl.

=== Design ===
The design of MetLife Stadium has been criticized, often in part due to its lack of a roof. This concern was raised ahead of Super Bowl XLVIII in 2014 given that the NFL does not award Super Bowls to stadiums in a cold climate that lack a roof.

== Awards and recognition ==
In 2009, MetLife Stadium was named the "Greenest Stadium" in the NFL by the Environmental Protection Agency (EPA).

In July 2017, MetLife Stadium was named "Venue of the Year" by the Stadium Business Summit. The award is awarded to the world's best stadium, arena or sports venue, that deserves recognition for an outstanding performance over a 12-month period.

== Notable events ==
=== Firsts and notable moments ===
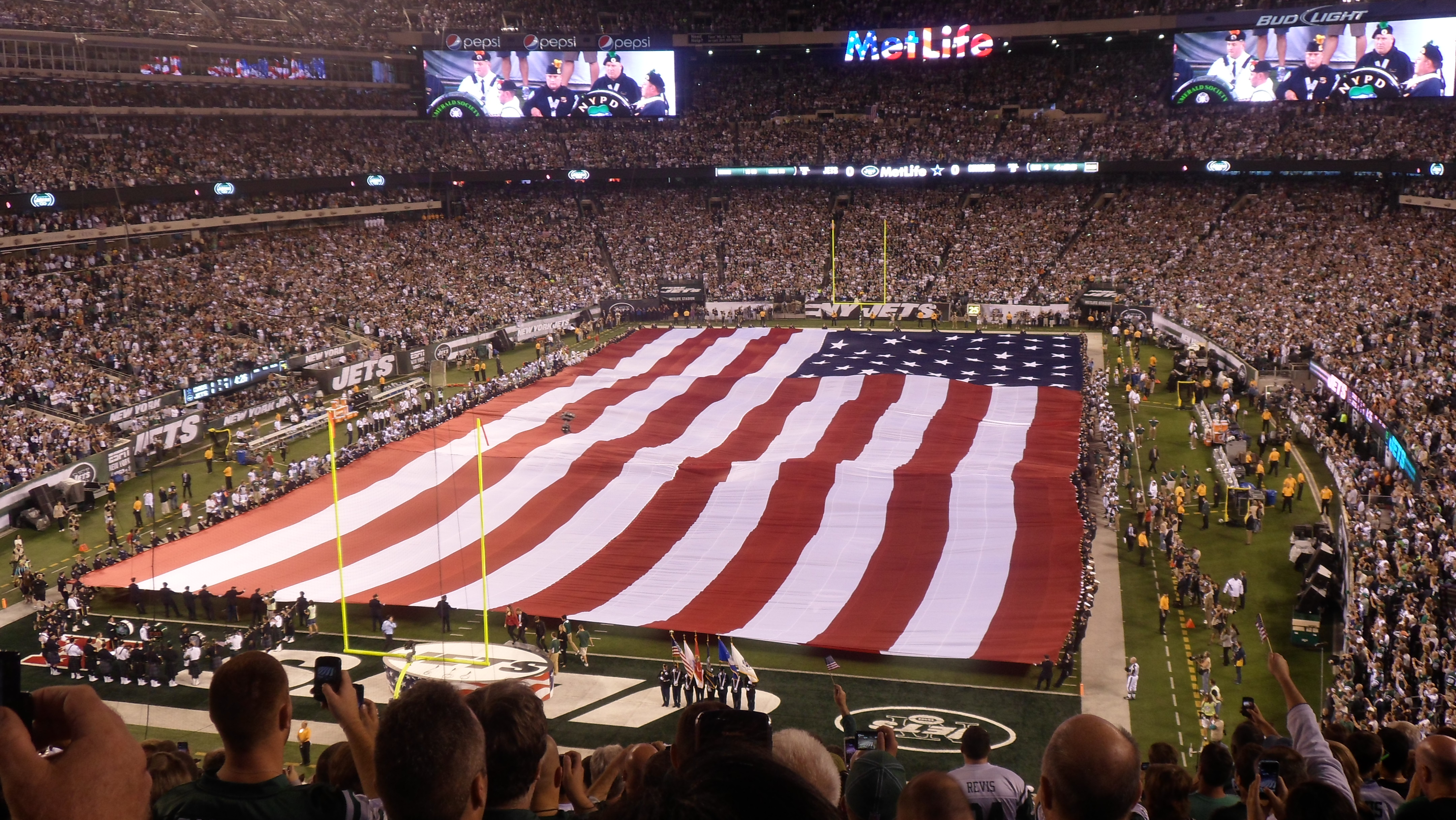
Pre-game ceremony prior to the Jets-Cowboys game on September 11, 2011

- The first event at the stadium was the Big City Classic lacrosse event, held on April 10, 2010.
- September 12, 2010: The Giants hosted the first NFL regular season game in the stadium's history against the Carolina Panthers, the same team that defeated the Giants in the final game at Giants Stadium. The Giants defeated the Panthers, 31–18.
- September 13, 2010: The Jets played their first game at the stadium, a 10–9 loss to the Baltimore Ravens on Monday Night Football.
- November 14, 2010: The stadium encountered two power outages during a game between the Giants and the Dallas Cowboys. The game was delayed about twenty-five minutes.
- December 19, 2010: The Philadelphia Eagles staged a comeback against the Giants in what has become known as the Miracle at the New Meadowlands, coming back from being down 31–10 with about eight minutes to go in the fourth quarter to win 38–31, capped off by DeSean Jackson's game winning punt return as time expired.
- September 11, 2011: On the 10th anniversary of the September 11 attacks, a ceremony was held prior to the game between the Jets and the Dallas Cowboys honoring the victims of the attacks. The Jets defeated the Cowboys 27–24.
- December 24, 2011: The visiting Giants defeated the hosting Jets 29–14 in what was the biggest regular season match-up between the two New York teams in recent years, due to postseason implications for both sides. Victor Cruz blew open a tight game with a 99-yard touchdown reception. The victory helped propel the Giants into the playoffs while contributing significantly to eliminating the Jets from a postseason appearance.
- January 8, 2012: MetLife Stadium hosted its first NFL playoff game, with the Giants defeating the Atlanta Falcons 24–2 in an NFC Wild Card Game, en route to their Super Bowl XLVI championship.
- November 23, 2014: During a 31–28 loss to the Dallas Cowboys on Sunday Night Football, Giants wide receiver Odell Beckham Jr. snagged a 43-yard one-handed touchdown catch from Eli Manning early in the second quarter. The catch, which was completed with only three fingers while Beckham was being interfered with, has been hailed by Cris Collinsworth, Tony Dungy, Victor Cruz, and LeBron James as the best catch of all time.
- February 9, 2020: The New York Guardians of the XFL played their first game at MetLife Stadium against the Tampa Bay Vipers, winning 23−3 in front of 17,634 fans.

=== Super Bowl XLVIII ===
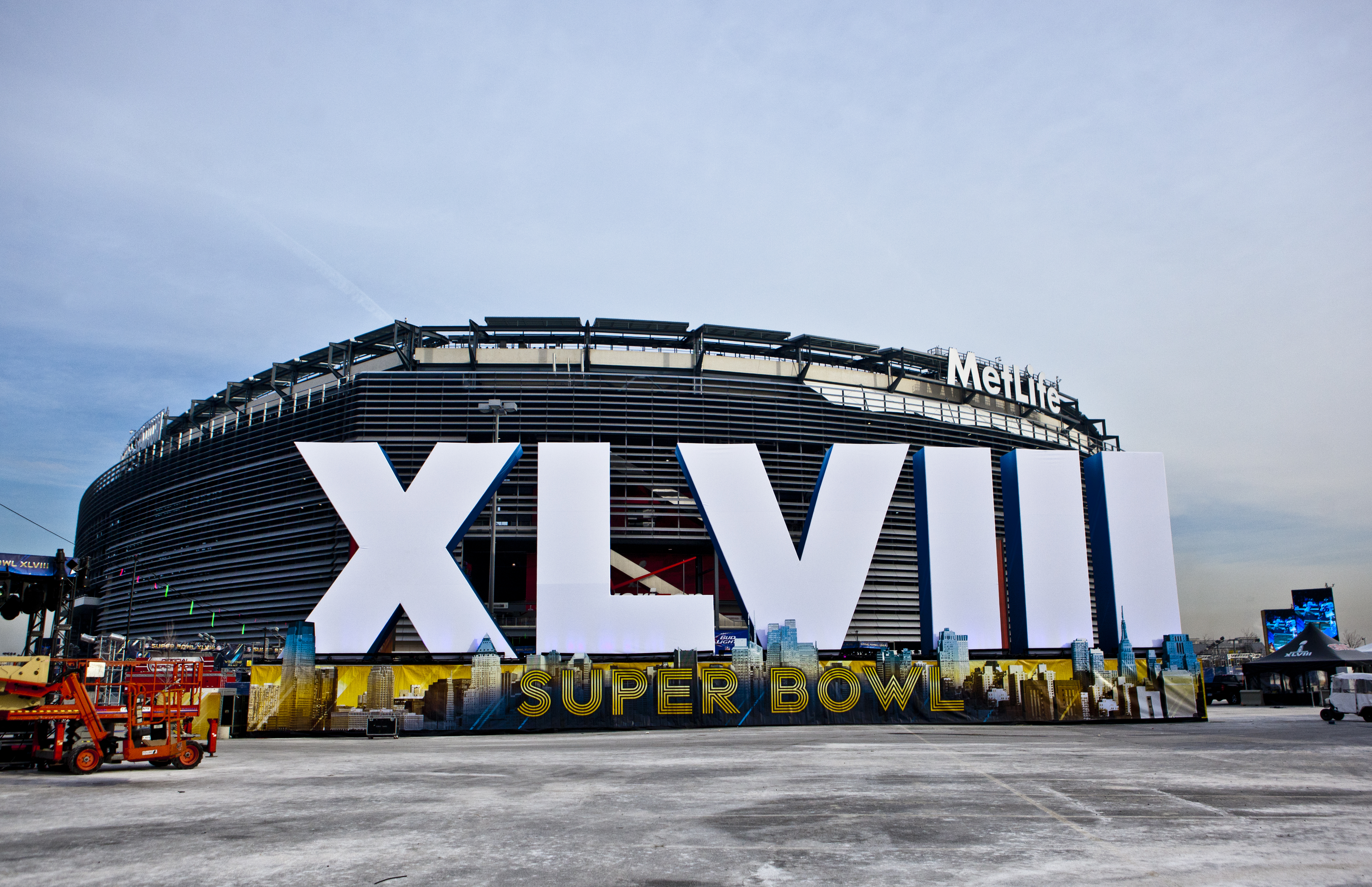
Exterior of MetLife Stadium prior to Super Bowl XLVIII in February 2014

On May 25, 2010, it was announced that Super Bowl XLVIII was awarded to the stadium, the first time a Super Bowl would be played in the New York metropolitan area, and the first time that a non-domed stadium in a cold-weather city would host it. Normally, Super Bowls must be held in indoor climate-controlled stadiums if they are held in a city with an average temperature lower than 50 °F (10 °C). However, NFL commissioner Roger Goodell waived this requirement and allowed MetLife Stadium on the ballot because of a "unique, once-only circumstance based on the opportunity to celebrate the new stadium and the great heritage and history of the NFL in the New York region." The game was played on February 2, 2014. The temperature at kickoff was 49 °F (9 °C), making it only the third-coldest Super Bowl on record. The Seattle Seahawks defeated the Denver Broncos 43–8 for their first Super Bowl victory.

=== Professional wrestling ===
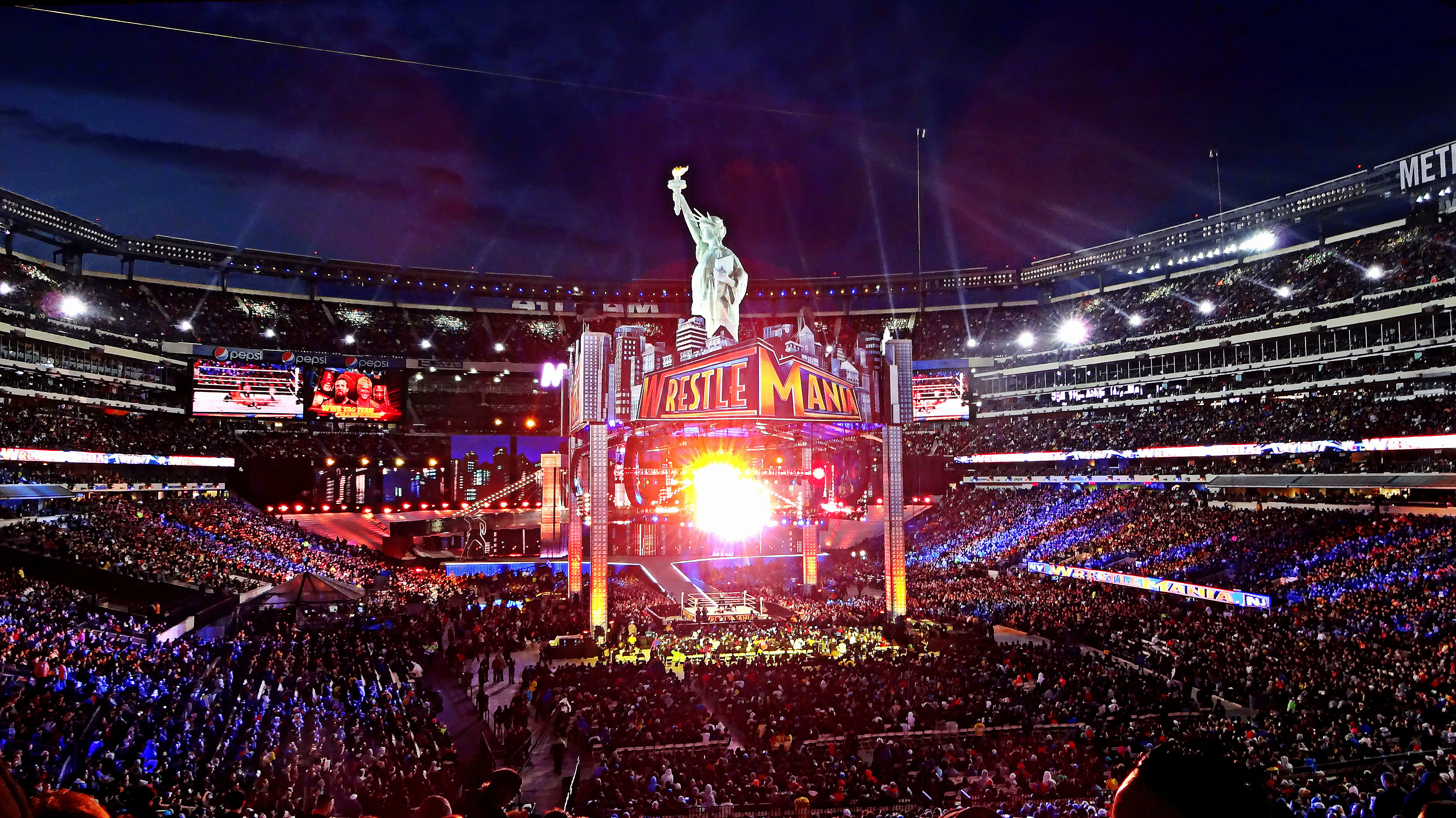
MetLife Stadium during WrestleMania 29

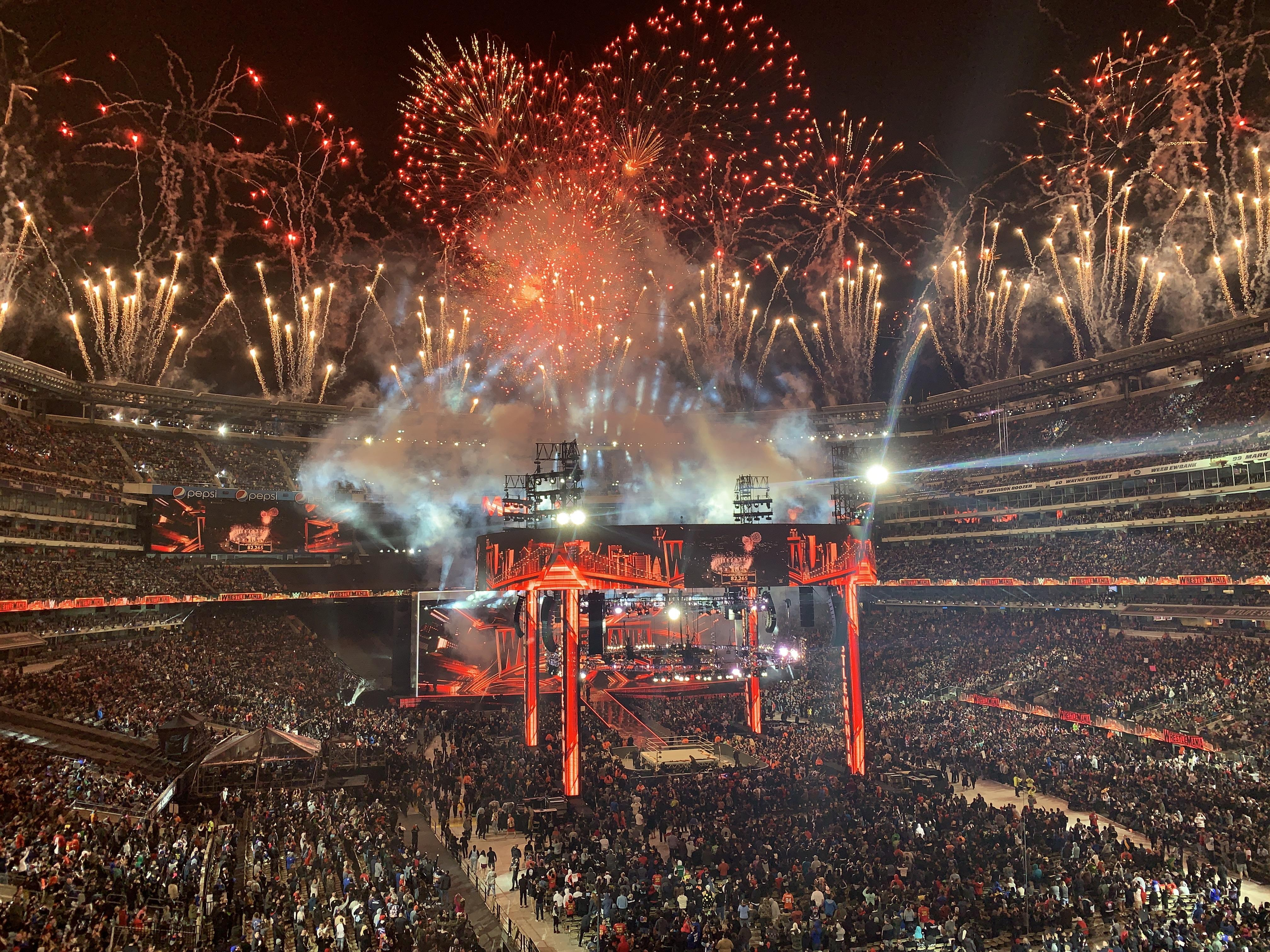
MetLife Stadium during WrestleMania 35

MetLife Stadium has twice hosted WrestleMania—the flagship pay-per-view event of the professional wrestling promotion WWE. WrestleMania 29 was held at MetLife Stadium on April 7, 2013. With 80,676 spectators, it was the third most-attended event in WWE history, and the highest-grossing event in WWE history at $12.3 million. Six years later, MetLife Stadium hosted WrestleMania 35 on April 7, 2019, overtaking WrestleMania 29 with an attendance of 82,265, and $16.9 million in revenue. Six years after WrestleMania 35, MetLife Stadium also hosted the first ever two-night SummerSlam, on August 2–3, 2025.

=== Soccer ===
MetLife Stadium is also designed for soccer. To prepare for a match, the stadium uses retractable seating in the field level corners to fit a FIFA-sanctioned soccer field. Along with being noted for providing exceptional sight-lines, this has allowed the stadium to host several major international matches.

The first international exhibition match was between Mexico and Ecuador on May 7, 2010, in front of 77,507 fans. The stadium hosted another international exhibition soccer match between the United States and Brazil on August 10, 2010. Brazil won 2–0 in front of a near-sellout crowd of 77,223; the game was played on a temporary grass field.

On March 26, 2011, the stadium hosted an international friendly, between the United States and Argentina, which ended in a 1–1 draw and was played in front of a sellout crowd of 78,926.

On June 18, 2011, the stadium hosted two quarterfinal matches of the 2011 CONCACAF Gold Cup. Costa Rica played Honduras to a 1–1 draw with Honduras winning on penalties 4–2 in the first match. The second match featured Mexico against Guatemala with Mexico winning 2–1.

On June 9, 2012, Argentina and Brazil played a friendly match, with Argentina winning in a thrilling 4–3 match featuring a Lionel Messi hat trick. Another exhibition match in preparation for the 2014 FIFA World Cup was played on November 14, 2012, between Colombia and Brazil, with Brazil acting as the local team despite a higher affluence of Colombian fans.

On August 4, 2013, the stadium hosted two second round matches of the 2013 International Champions Cup. The first match saw Valencia defeat Inter Milan 4–0 and the second match saw Chelsea defeat AC Milan 2–0.

On November 15, 2013, Argentina and Ecuador played an international friendly to a 0–0 draw.

On June 10, 2014, the stadium hosted an international friendly before the 2014 FIFA World Cup between the Republic of Ireland and Portugal with Portugal beating Ireland 5–1.

On September 9, 2014, the stadium hosted an international friendly between Brazil and Ecuador with Brazil victorious 1–0.

On March 31, 2015, the stadium hosted an international friendly rematch of Argentina and Ecuador with Argentina prevailing 2–1 in front of 48,000 fans.

On July 19, 2015, the stadium hosted two quarterfinal matches of the 2015 CONCACAF Gold Cup. Trinidad and Tobago played Panama to a 1–1 draw with Panama winning on penalties 6–5. The second match saw Mexico defeat Costa Rica 1–0.

On August 3, 2016, MetLife Stadium hosted a 2016 International Champions Cup match between Real Madrid and FC Bayern Munich; Real Madrid won the match 1–0.

On July 22, 2017, a match of the 2017 International Champions Cup was played between FC Barcelona and Juventus. Barcelona won the match 2–1 in front of 82,104 fans.

MetLife Stadium hosted two matches as part of the 2018 International Champions Cup. The first match on July 25, 2018, between Manchester City F.C. and Liverpool F.C., with it ending 2–1 in favor of Liverpool, and the second match on August 7, 2018, between Real Madrid and AS Roma, also ending in a 2–1 victory for Real Madrid.

On September 7, 2018, the stadium hosted the United States and Brazil in an international friendly match as part of U.S. Soccer's "Kickoff Series", which Brazil won by a score of 2–0 with goals from Roberto Firmino and Neymar. On September 11, the stadium hosted an international friendly between Colombia and Argentina.

On July 29, 2019, during the 2019 International Champions Cup, the stadium hosted the first Madrid derby held outside of Europe between Real Madrid and Atlético Madrid, which Atlético won 7–3. On September 6, MetLife Stadium hosted the 70th all time meeting of the United States and Mexico with Mexico winning 3–0 in front of a crowd of 47,960.

On July 23, 2023, the stadium hosted an international friendly between Premier League clubs Manchester United and Arsenal in front of a stadium soccer record crowd of 82,262 with United winning 2–0.

On August 3, 2024, MetLife Stadium hosted a preseason match of El Clásico between Barcelona and Real Madrid with Barcelona winning 2–1 in front of 82,154 fans.

MetLife Stadium was one of twelve venues that hosted the 2025 FIFA Club World Cup, including the final won by Chelsea F.C..

==== 2011 CONCACAF Gold Cup ====
Date	Time (UTC−4)	Team #1	Score	Team #2	Round	Attendance
June 18, 2011	16:00	Costa Rica	1–1 (a.e.t.) (2–4 p)	Honduras	Quarterfinals	78,807
June 18, 2011	20:00	Mexico	2–1	Guatemala	Quarterfinals	78,807

==== 2015 CONCACAF Gold Cup ====
Date	Time (UTC−4)	Team #1	Score	Team #2	Round	Attendance
July 19, 2015	16:30	Trinidad and Tobago	1–1 (a.e.t.) (5–6 p)	Panama	Quarterfinals	74,187
July 19, 2015	19:30	Mexico	1–0 (a.e.t.)	Costa Rica	Quarterfinals	74,187

==== Copa América Centenario ====
The stadium hosted the final of the Copa América Centenario—a special U.S.-hosted edition of the Copa América tournament co-organized by CONCACAF, marking the centennial of South America's soccer federation CONMEBOL. After a 0–0 draw after extra time, Chile beat Argentina 4–2 on penalties to win the tournament.

Date	Time (UTC−4)	Team #1	Score	Team #2	Round	Attendance
June 26, 2016	20:00	Chile	0–0 (a.e.t.) (4–2 p)	Argentina	Final	82,026

==== 2024 Copa América ====
The stadium hosted three matches during the 2024 Copa América: two in the group stage and a semifinal match.

Date	Time (UTC−4)	Team #1	Score	Team #2	Round	Attendance
June 25, 2024	21:00	Chile	0–1	Argentina	Group A	81,106
June 27, 2024	21:00	Uruguay	5–0	Bolivia	Group C	48,033
July 9, 2024	20:00	Argentina	2–0	Canada	Semifinals	80,102

==== 2025 FIFA Club World Cup ====
The stadium hosted nine matches during the 2025 FIFA Club World Cup, including the final.

Date	Time (UTC−4)	Team #1	Score	Team #2	Round	Attendance
June 15, 2025	18:00	(Brazil) Palmeiras	0–0	(Portugal) Porto	Group A	46,275
June 17, 2025	12:00	(Brazil) Fluminense	0–0	(Germany) Borussia Dortmund	Group F	34,736
June 19, 2025	12:00	(Brazil) Palmeiras	2–0	(Egypt) Al Ahly	Group A	35,179
June 21, 2025	15:00	(Brazil) Fluminense	4–2	(South Korea) Ulsan HD	Group F	29,321
June 23, 2025	21:00	(Portugal) Porto	4–4	(Egypt) Al Ahly	Group A	39,893
July 5, 2025	16:00	(Spain) Real Madrid	3–2	(Germany) Borussia Dortmund	Quarterfinals	76,611
July 8, 2025	15:00	(Brazil) Fluminense	0–2	(England) Chelsea	Semifinals	70,556
July 9, 2025	15:00	(France) Paris Saint-Germain	4–0	(Spain) Real Madrid	Semifinals	77,542
July 13, 2025	15:00	(England) Chelsea	3–0	(France) Paris Saint-Germain	Final	81,118

==== 2026 FIFA World Cup ====
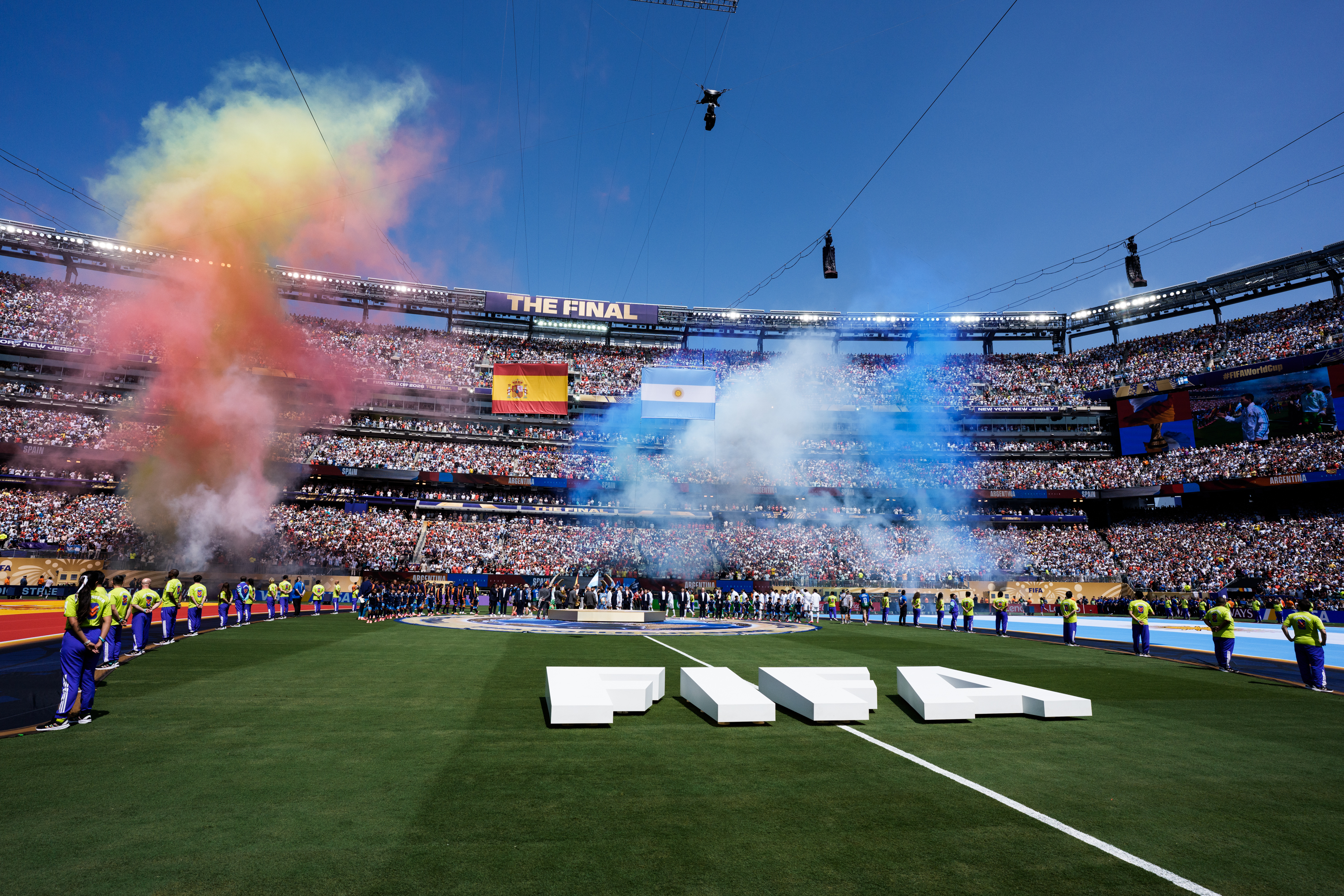
MetLife Stadium prior to the 2026 FIFA World Cup final between Spain and Argentina

MetLife Stadium was one of sixteen venues, as well as one of the eleven American venues which hosted matches during the 2026 FIFA World Cup. As per FIFA requirements, the stadium had a grass field installed for the World Cup matches, and was temporarily renamed New York New Jersey Stadium in April 2026 in accordance with FIFA's policy on corporate-sponsored names. The stadium hosted five group stage matches, one Round of 32 match, one Round of 16 match, and hosted the final.

Date	Time (UTC−4)	Team #1	Score	Team #2	Round	Attendance
June 13, 2026	18:00	Brazil	1–1	Morocco	Group C	80,663
June 16, 2026	15:00	France	3–1	Senegal	Group I	80,545
June 22, 2026	20:00	Norway	3–2	Senegal	Group I	80,663
June 25, 2026	16:00	Ecuador	2–1	Germany	Group E	80,663
June 27, 2026	17:00	Panama	0–2	England	Group L	80,663
June 30, 2026	17:00	France	3–0	Sweden	Round of 32	80,663
July 5, 2026	16:00	Brazil	1–2	Norway	Round of 16	80,663
July 19, 2026	15:00	Spain	1–0 (a.e.t.)	Argentina	Final	80,663

=== College football ===
On October 16, 2010, Rutgers hosted Army in the first college football game to be played in the new stadium, with the Scarlet Knights defeating the Black Knights in overtime, 23–20. During the game's second half, Rutgers player Eric LeGrand was injured on a special teams play, defending a Rutgers kickoff, and paralyzed from the neck down.

Syracuse University has hosted selected home games at MetLife Stadium in lieu of the Carrier Dome. The first of these games, branded as New York's College Classic, was played in 2012 against the visiting USC Trojans, who won 42–29. In 2013, the team opened its season against its rival Penn State at the stadium, losing 23–17. In 2014, the team hosted the Notre Dame Fighting Irish at MetLife Stadium, losing 31–15. A rematch was held in 2016, once again losing to the Fighting Irish 50–33.

On November 16, 2019, MetLife Stadium hosted the 61st Cortaca Jug rivalry game between the NCAA Division III Cortland Red Dragons and Ithaca Bombers. With an attendance of 45,161, it set a record for the most-attended football game in Division III history. The game was held at MetLife Stadium as part of season-long commemorations of the 150th anniversary of college football.

On December 11, 2021, MetLife Stadium hosted the 122nd Army–Navy Game. This was the first time the historic matchup was held at MetLife. Previous matchups were held at Giants Stadium in 1989, 1993, 1997, and 2002. Navy defeated Army 17–13.

=== Outdoor ice hockey ===
In 2024, MetLife Stadium hosted two National Hockey League games as part of the Stadium Series. The New Jersey Devils hosted the Philadelphia Flyers on February 17, 2024. Devils captain Nico Hischier scored the first NHL goal in MetLife Stadium history on a breakaway 32 seconds into the first period of the game, ultimately scoring two goals on the night en route to the Devils victory over the Flyers by a final score of 6–3 before a crowd of 70,328 fans. The following day, the New York Rangers defeated the New York Islanders 6–5 in overtime following a 3-goal comeback from a 3–5 deficit in front of 79,690 fans in attendance, which was the third largest attendance in NHL history. Rangers forward Artemi Panarin was awarded the game-winning goal 10 seconds into overtime as the net came off its moorings by Islanders defenseman Noah Dobson. After video review, it was confirmed that the puck would've crossed the goal line had the net stayed in place. This was the first time MetLife Stadium had ever hosted NHL hockey and the first time outdoor NHL hockey had ever been played in the state of New Jersey. Yankee Stadium hosted two games as part of the 2014 NHL Stadium Series, in which the New York Rangers won both games, defeating the New Jersey Devils 7-3 and defeating the New York Islanders 2–1. Citi Field previously hosted the 2018 NHL Winter Classic as well, with the Rangers defeating the Buffalo Sabres 3–2 in overtime.

=== Concerts ===
Date	Main act(s)	Opening act(s) / Guest(s)	Tour / Concert name	Tickets sold / available for	Gross revenue	Notes
May 26, 2010	Bon Jovi	Train, Gavin DeGraw, OneRepublic, Kid Rock	The Circle Tour	206,099 / 206,099 (100%) (with July 9 show)	$21,386,437 (with July 9 show)	
May 27, 2010	Bon Jovi	Train, Gavin DeGraw, OneRepublic, Kid Rock	The Circle Tour	206,099 / 206,099 (100%) (with July 9 show)	$21,386,437 (with July 9 show)	
May 29, 2010	Bon Jovi	Train, Gavin DeGraw, OneRepublic, Kid Rock	The Circle Tour	206,099 / 206,099 (100%) (with July 9 show)	$21,386,437 (with July 9 show)	
June 6, 2010	Performers: Drake; Trey Songz; Ludacris; Juelz Santana; Nicki Minaj; Fabolous; Talib Kweli & Hi-Tek; DJ Khaled; Usher; Gucci Mane	Guests: Waka Flocka Flame; Lloyd Banks; J. Cole; Estelle; Red Cafe; Maino; Birdman; Gyptian; Cassie; T-Pain; Cam'ron; Busta Rhymes; Rick Ross; Fat Joe	2010 Summer Jam	49,048 / 49,048 (100%)	$4,308,316	
June 10, 2010	Eagles	Dixie Chicks; Keith Urban	Long Road Out of Eden Tour	31,482 / 33,564 (94%)	$3,390,308	
July 9, 2010	Bon Jovi	Train, Gavin DeGraw, OneRepublic, Kid Rock	The Circle Tour	(see above)	(see above)	
June 5, 2011	Performers: Lil Wayne; Drake; Birdman; Young Money; Chris Brown; The Diplomats; Rick Ross; Fabolous; Wiz Khalifa; Lloyd Banks; Waka Flocka Flame	Guests: Busta Rhymes; Drake; DJ Khaled; Wale; Meek Mill; P. Diddy; French Montana	2011 Summer Jam	45,633 / 45,633 (100%)	$4,791,268	
July 20, 2011	U2	Interpol	U2 360° Tour	88,491 / 88,491 (100%)	$8,927,150	
August 13, 2011	Kenny Chesney; Zac Brown Band	Billy Currington; Uncle Kracker	Goin' Coastal Tour	55,239 / 55,239 (100%)	$5,058,534	
May 18, 2012	Performers: Armin van Buuren; Chase & Status; Fatboy Slim; Fedde le Grand; Madeon; Cosmic Gate; Funkagenda	—N/a	2012 Electric Daisy Carnival New York	100,000 / 110,000 (91%)	$7,294,307	
May 19, 2012	Performers: Avicii; Sebastian Ingrosso; Calvin Harris; Alesso; Cazzette; Chris Lake; Michael Woods; EDX	—N/a	2012 Electric Daisy Carnival New York	100,000 / 110,000 (91%)	$7,294,307	
May 20, 2012	Performers: Afrojack; Bassnectar; Dirty South; Chuckie; Sunnery James & Ryan Marciano; Manufactured Superstars; Jidax; The M Machine	—N/a	2012 Electric Daisy Carnival New York	100,000 / 110,000 (91%)	$7,294,307	
June 3, 2012	Performers: Waka Flocka Flame; French Montana; Maino; Tyga; 2 Chainz; Young Jeezy; J. Cole; Wale; Meek Mill; Trey Songz; Big Sean; Rick Ross; Nas	Guests: Ne-Yo; T.I.; Pusha T; Mase; Lauryn Hill; Wu-Tang Clan	2012 Summer Jam	42,696 / 42,696 (100%)	$4,597,632	
August 11, 2012	Kenny Chesney; Tim McGraw	Grace Potter and the Nocturnals; Jake Owen	Brothers of the Sun Tour	56,285 / 56,285 (100%)	$5,523,669	
September 19, 2012	Bruce Springsteen and the E Street Band	—N/a	Wrecking Ball World Tour	152,290 / 159,000 (95%)	$14,409,760	Vini "Mad Dog" Lopez was the special guest at the first show and Gary U.S. Bonds was the special guest at the second and third shows. The third (and final) show was delayed for two hours due to a strong thunderstorm. The show finally got underway around 10:30 pm, prompting fans to sing "Happy Birthday" to Springsteen at midnight to celebrate his 63rd birthday. At the end of the show, Springsteen was presented with a guitar-shaped birthday cake onstage. The concert was released as a live album in June 2019.
September 21, 2012	Bruce Springsteen and the E Street Band	—N/a	Wrecking Ball World Tour	152,290 / 159,000 (95%)	$14,409,760	
September 22, 2012	Bruce Springsteen and the E Street Band	—N/a	Wrecking Ball World Tour	152,290 / 159,000 (95%)	$14,409,760	
June 2, 2013	Performers: Wu-Tang Clan; Kendrick Lamar; ASAP Rocky; Miguel; Chris Brown; 2 Chainz; French Montana; Wale; Fabolous; Joe Budden	Guests: Mariah Carey; Nicki Minaj; Meek Mill; Rick Ross; Lil Wayne; Lil' Kim; Joell Ortiz; Schoolboy Q; Jay Rock; Ab-Soul; Papoose; Bone Thugs-n-Harmony; Trinidad James; Ace Hood; DJ Khaled; Tank	2013 Summer Jam	41,598 / 41,598 (100%)	$3,793,412	
July 13, 2013	Taylor Swift	Ed Sheeran; Austin Mahone; Joel Crouse	The Red Tour	52,399 / 52,399 (100%)	$4,670,011	Patrick Stump of Fall Out Boy was the special guest.
July 25, 2013	Bon Jovi	The J. Geils Band	Because We Can	95,991 / 95,991 (100%)	$9,594,635	
July 27, 2013	Bon Jovi	The J. Geils Band	Because We Can	95,991 / 95,991 (100%)	$9,594,635	
August 10, 2013	Kenny Chesney; Eric Church	Eli Young Band; Kacey Musgraves	No Shoes Nation Tour	53,416 / 53,416 (100%)	$4,849,247	
July 11, 2014	Beyoncé; Jay-Z	—N/a	On the Run Tour	89,165 / 89,165 (100%)	$11,544,187	
July 12, 2014	Beyoncé; Jay-Z	—N/a	On the Run Tour	89,165 / 89,165 (100%)	$11,544,187	
August 4, 2014	One Direction	5 Seconds of Summer	Where We Are Tour	139,247 / 139,247 (100%)	$12,345,803	
August 5, 2014	One Direction	5 Seconds of Summer	Where We Are Tour	139,247 / 139,247 (100%)	$12,345,803	
August 16, 2014	Eminem; Rihanna	—N/a	The Monster Tour	100,420 / 100,420 (100%)	$12,358,850	Both shows were the 6th highest-grossing box office of the year.
August 17, 2014	Eminem; Rihanna	—N/a	The Monster Tour	100,420 / 100,420 (100%)	$12,358,850	Both shows were the 6th highest-grossing box office of the year.
July 10, 2015	Taylor Swift	Vance Joy; Shawn Mendes; HAIM	The 1989 World Tour	110,105 / 110,105 (100%)	$13,423,858	The Weeknd; Heidi Klum and United States women's national soccer team; Lily Aldridge, Lena Dunham, Gigi Hadid and Hailee Steinfeld were special guests at the first show. Nick Jonas; Gigi Hadid, Martha Hunt, Lily Aldridge, Candice Swanepoel, Behati Prinsloo, Karlie Kloss, and Uzo Aduba were special guests at the second show.
July 11, 2015	Taylor Swift	Vance Joy; Shawn Mendes; HAIM	The 1989 World Tour	110,105 / 110,105 (100%)	$13,423,858	The Weeknd; Heidi Klum and United States women's national soccer team; Lily Aldridge, Lena Dunham, Gigi Hadid and Hailee Steinfeld were special guests at the first show. Nick Jonas; Gigi Hadid, Martha Hunt, Lily Aldridge, Candice Swanepoel, Behati Prinsloo, Karlie Kloss, and Uzo Aduba were special guests at the second show.
August 5, 2015	One Direction	Icona Pop	On The Road Again Tour	56,159 / 56,159 (100%)	$5,156,858	
August 15, 2015	Kenny Chesney; Jason Aldean	Brantley Gilbert; Cole Swindell; Old Dominion	The Big Revival Tour (Chesney); Burn It Down Tour (Aldean)	58,642 / 58,642 (100%)	$6,067,017	
August 26, 2015	AC/DC	Vintage Trouble	Rock or Bust World Tour	48,881 / 50,000 (98%)	$4,492,251	
July 16, 2016	Coldplay	Alessia Cara; Foxes	A Head Full of Dreams Tour	100,763 / 100,763 (100%)	$10,749,394	
July 17, 2016	Coldplay	Alessia Cara; Foxes	A Head Full of Dreams Tour	100,763 / 100,763 (100%)	$10,749,394	
July 23, 2016	Guns N' Roses	Lenny Kravitz	Not in This Lifetime... Tour	100,177 / 100,177 (100%)	$11,687,391	
July 24, 2016	Guns N' Roses	Lenny Kravitz	Not in This Lifetime... Tour	100,177 / 100,177 (100%)	$11,687,391	
August 7, 2016	Paul McCartney	—N/a	One on One	52,465 / 52,465 (100%)	$7,808,072	
August 20, 2016	Kenny Chesney	Miranda Lambert; Sam Hunt; Old Dominion	Spread the Love Tour	56,292 / 56,292 (100%)	$5,736,232	
August 23, 2016	Bruce Springsteen and the E Street Band	—N/a	The River Tour 2016	153,930 / 153,930 (100%)	$18,239,039	The first show lasted 3 hours and 52 minutes, at the time his longest show ever in the United States and the third longest show of his career. The second show lasted 3 hours and 59 minutes surpassing the previous show in which Tom Morello was the special guest. The third and final show lasted 4 hours and 1 minute in which Rickie Lee Jones was the special guest.
August 25, 2016	Bruce Springsteen and the E Street Band	—N/a	The River Tour 2016	153,930 / 153,930 (100%)	$18,239,039	The first show lasted 3 hours and 52 minutes, at the time his longest show ever in the United States and the third longest show of his career. The second show lasted 3 hours and 59 minutes surpassing the previous show in which Tom Morello was the special guest. The third and final show lasted 4 hours and 1 minute in which Rickie Lee Jones was the special guest.
August 30, 2016	Bruce Springsteen and the E Street Band	—N/a	The River Tour 2016	153,930 / 153,930 (100%)	$18,239,039	The first show lasted 3 hours and 52 minutes, at the time his longest show ever in the United States and the third longest show of his career. The second show lasted 3 hours and 59 minutes surpassing the previous show in which Tom Morello was the special guest. The third and final show lasted 4 hours and 1 minute in which Rickie Lee Jones was the special guest.
October 7, 2016	Beyoncé	DJ Khaled	The Formation World Tour	50,703 / 50,703 (100%)	$6,064,625	This concert was originally scheduled to take place on September 7, 2016, but was rescheduled due to doctor's orders for vocal rest. Serena Williams, Jay-Z and Kendrick Lamar were special guests. Beyoncé also added "6 Inch" to the setlist.
May 14, 2017	Metallica	Avenged Sevenfold; Volbeat	WorldWired Tour	46,941 / 49,155 (95%)	$5,955,038	
June 28, 2017	U2	The Lumineers	The Joshua Tree Tour 2017	110,642 / 110,642 (100%)	$14,568,805	
June 29, 2017	U2	The Lumineers	The Joshua Tree Tour 2017	110,642 / 110,642 (100%)	$14,568,805	
August 1, 2017	Coldplay	AlunaGeorge; Izzy Bizu	A Head Full of Dreams Tour	54,501 / 54,501 (100%)	$7,861,460	
June 2, 2018	Luke Bryan	Sam Hunt; John Pardi; Morgan Wallen	What Makes You Country Tour	46,057	$3,900,000	
July 20, 2018	Taylor Swift	Camila Cabello; Charli XCX	Taylor Swift's Reputation Stadium Tour	165,564 / 165,564 (100%)	$22,031,386	Swift became the first female artist in history to headline and sell out three consecutive shows at the stadium. During the second show, Swift performed "Clean" before the "Long Live" / "New Year's Day" medley. During the third show, Swift performed "So It Goes..." in place of "Dancing with Our Hands Tied".
July 21, 2018	Taylor Swift	Camila Cabello; Charli XCX	Taylor Swift's Reputation Stadium Tour	165,564 / 165,564 (100%)	$22,031,386	Swift became the first female artist in history to headline and sell out three consecutive shows at the stadium. During the second show, Swift performed "Clean" before the "Long Live" / "New Year's Day" medley. During the third show, Swift performed "So It Goes..." in place of "Dancing with Our Hands Tied".
July 22, 2018	Taylor Swift	Camila Cabello; Charli XCX	Taylor Swift's Reputation Stadium Tour	165,564 / 165,564 (100%)	$22,031,386	Swift became the first female artist in history to headline and sell out three consecutive shows at the stadium. During the second show, Swift performed "Clean" before the "Long Live" / "New Year's Day" medley. During the third show, Swift performed "So It Goes..." in place of "Dancing with Our Hands Tied".
August 2, 2018	Beyoncé; Jay-Z	Chloe x Halle; DJ Khaled	On the Run II Tour	99,755 / 99,755 (100%)	$13,886,416	At the beginning of the first show, the entire stadium was evacuated due to a nearby thunderstorm. The show start time was postponed until 11:30pm with the show ending at 1:30am. During the second show, "Nice" was added to the setlist.
August 3, 2018	Beyoncé; Jay-Z	Chloe x Halle; DJ Khaled	On the Run II Tour	99,755 / 99,755 (100%)	$13,886,416	At the beginning of the first show, the entire stadium was evacuated due to a nearby thunderstorm. The show start time was postponed until 11:30pm with the show ending at 1:30am. During the second show, "Nice" was added to the setlist.
August 18, 2018	Kenny Chesney	Thomas Rhett; Old Dominion; Brandon Lay	Trip Around The Sun Tour	—N/a	—N/a	
September 21, 2018	Ed Sheeran	Snow Patrol; Anne-Marie	÷ Tour	107,500 / 107,500 (100%)	$11,220,207	
September 22, 2018	Ed Sheeran	Snow Patrol; Anne-Marie	÷ Tour	107,500 / 107,500 (100%)	$11,220,207	
May 18, 2019	BTS	—N/a	Love Yourself World Tour	98,574 / 98,574 (100%)	$14,050,410	BTS became the first Korean act to perform at the stadium.
May 19, 2019	BTS	—N/a	Love Yourself World Tour	98,574 / 98,574 (100%)	$14,050,410	BTS became the first Korean act to perform at the stadium.
August 1, 2019	The Rolling Stones	The Wombats	No Filter Tour	104,964 / 104,964 (100%)	$25,510,438	These concerts were originally scheduled to take place on June 13 and 17, 2019 but were postponed due to Mick Jagger recovering from a heart procedure.
August 5, 2019	The Rolling Stones	Lukas Nelson & Promise of the Real	No Filter Tour	104,964 / 104,964 (100%)	$25,510,438	These concerts were originally scheduled to take place on June 13 and 17, 2019 but were postponed due to Mick Jagger recovering from a heart procedure.
September 21, 2019	Romeo Santos	Guests: Aventura; Raulin Rodriguez; Kiko Rodriguez; Ozuna; Wisin Y Yandel; Zacarias Ferreira; Luis Vargas; El Chaval de la Bachata; Frank Reyes; Joe Veras; Monchy & Alexandra; Elvis Martinez; Cardi B	Utopía Concert		$9,003,680	The first Latin artist ever to perform in this stadium as a headliner
August 5, 2021	Guns N' Roses	Mammoth WVH	We're F'N' Back! Tour	TBA	TBA	Originally planned for July 18, 2020 as a stop on the Guns N' Roses 2020 Tour; Postponed due to pandemic
October 9, 2021	Aventura	Guests: Judy Santos; • Tonio Skits •Radel Ortiz •Isabel Ortiz	Inmortal Stadium Tour	48,327 / 48,327 (100%)	$7,339,642	The first Latin band ever to perform in this stadium as a headliners. This was also the end of the Inmortal Tour in the United States. This was also their second time at MetLife. Their first was when they were the closing act for the lead singer Romeo Santos's Utopía Concert back in 2019.
June 4, 2022	Coldplay	H.E.R. Bea Miller	Music of the Spheres World Tour	117,240 / 117,240 (100%)	$13,153,892	Kylie Minogue was the special guest at the first show, performing "Can't Get You Out of My Head" with the band. Bruce Springsteen was the special guest at the second show, performing "Working on a Dream" and "Dancing in the Dark" with the band.
June 5, 2022	Coldplay	H.E.R. Bea Miller	Music of the Spheres World Tour	117,240 / 117,240 (100%)	$13,153,892	Kylie Minogue was the special guest at the first show, performing "Can't Get You Out of My Head" with the band. Bruce Springsteen was the special guest at the second show, performing "Working on a Dream" and "Dancing in the Dark" with the band.
June 16, 2022	Paul McCartney	—N/a	Got Back	51,872 / 51,872 (100%)	$13,012,034	Bruce Springsteen and Jon Bon Jovi were the special guests.
June 18, 2022	Grupo Firme	—N/a	Enfiestados y Amanecidos Tour			
July 16, 2022	The Weeknd	Kaytranada; Mike Dean	After Hours til Dawn Tour			The Weeknd premiered a trailer for his upcoming HBO series, The Idol, at this show right before he went on stage.
July 23, 2022	Elton John	—N/a	Farewell Yellow Brick Road			
July 24, 2022	Elton John	—N/a	Farewell Yellow Brick Road			
July 30, 2022	Los Bukis	—N/a	Una Historia Cantada			
August 11, 2022	Lady Gaga	—N/a	The Chromatica Ball	53,155 / 53,155 (100%)	$8,412,348	Originally planned for August 19, 2020, before initially being delayed to August 19, 2021; Postponed due to pandemic
August 13, 2022	Kenny Chesney	Dan + Shay; Old Dominion; Carly Pearce	Here and Now Tour			Originally known as the Chillaxification Tour; Originally planned for August 22, 2020, before initially being delayed to August 13, 2021; Postponed due to pandemic
August 17, 2022	Red Hot Chili Peppers	The Strokes; Thundercat	2022 Global Stadium Tour	50,944 / 50,944 (100%)	$9,475,596	
September 6, 2022	Rammstein	—N/a	Rammstein Stadium Tour			Originally planned for September 10, 2020, before initially being delayed to September 10, 2021; Postponed due to pandemic
May 26, 2023	Taylor Swift	Phoebe Bridgers; Gayle	The Eras Tour			Swift became the first artist in history to headline and sell out three consecutive shows at the stadium twice. Highest three-day attendance in stadium history.
May 27, 2023	Taylor Swift	Phoebe Bridgers; Gracie Abrams	The Eras Tour			Swift became the first artist in history to headline and sell out three consecutive shows at the stadium twice. Highest three-day attendance in stadium history.
May 28, 2023	Taylor Swift	Phoebe Bridgers; Owenn	The Eras Tour			Swift became the first artist in history to headline and sell out three consecutive shows at the stadium twice. Highest three-day attendance in stadium history.
June 10, 2023	Ed Sheeran	Dylan; Khalid	Mathematics Tour	173,390 / 173,390 (100%)	$18,007,052	Sheeran broke the attendance record for a concert in this venue with 89,000 fans attending his show on June 11.
June 11, 2023	Ed Sheeran	Dylan; Khalid	Mathematics Tour	173,390 / 173,390 (100%)	$18,007,052	Sheeran broke the attendance record for a concert in this venue with 89,000 fans attending his show on June 11.
July 6, 2023	TWICE	—N/a	Ready to Be World Tour	47,907 (100%)	$7,557,127	Became the first Korean female act to headline and sell out at MetLife Stadium
July 29, 2023	Beyoncé		Renaissance World Tour	106,056 / 106,056 (100%)	$33,082,997	Highest-grossing boxscore report in the stadium's history.
July 30, 2023	Beyoncé		Renaissance World Tour	106,056 / 106,056 (100%)	$33,082,997	Highest-grossing boxscore report in the stadium's history.
August 4, 2023	Metallica	Pantera; Mammoth WVH	M72 World Tour	163,028 / 163,028 (100%)	$20,848,071	
August 6, 2023	Metallica	Five Finger Death Punch; Ice Nine Kills	M72 World Tour	163,028 / 163,028 (100%)	$20,848,071	
August 11, 2023	Blackpink	—N/a	Born Pink World Tour	95,437/ 95,437 (100%)	$17,506,005	Became the first Korean female act to headline and sell out 2 consecutive shows at MetLife Stadium
August 12, 2023	Blackpink	—N/a	Born Pink World Tour	95,437/ 95,437 (100%)	$17,506,005	Became the first Korean female act to headline and sell out 2 consecutive shows at MetLife Stadium
August 15, 2023	Guns N' Roses	—N/a	2023 Tour			
August 30, 2023	Bruce Springsteen and the E Street Band	—N/a	2023 Tour			
September 1, 2023	Bruce Springsteen and the E Street Band	—N/a	2023 Tour			
September 3, 2023	Bruce Springsteen and the E Street Band	—N/a	2023 Tour			
September 7, 2023	Karol G	Agudelo	Mañana Será Bonito Tour	109,793 / 109,793 (100%)	$24,373,218	The first Latin act to headline and sell out 2 shows at MetLife Stadium.
September 8, 2023	Karol G	Agudelo; Young Miko	Mañana Será Bonito Tour	109,793 / 109,793 (100%)	$24,373,218	The first Latin act to headline and sell out 2 shows at MetLife Stadium.
May 17, 2024	Morgan Wallen		One Night At A Time World Tour			Rescheduled from May 19 and 20, 2023 for health reasons.
May 18, 2024	Morgan Wallen		One Night At A Time World Tour			Rescheduled from May 19 and 20, 2023 for health reasons.
May 23, 2024	The Rolling Stones		Hackney Diamonds Tour	105,124 / 105,124	$29,155,574	
May 26, 2024	The Rolling Stones	Lawrence	Hackney Diamonds Tour	105,124 / 105,124	$29,155,574	
July 19, 2024	Luke Combs		Growin’ Up And Gettin’ Old Tour			
July 20, 2024	Luke Combs		Growin’ Up And Gettin’ Old Tour			
August 17, 2024	Kenny Chesney; Zac Brown Band	Megan Moroney; Uncle Kracker	Sun Goes Down 2024 Tour			
October 3, 2024	Pink	Sheryl Crow; KidCutUp; The Script	P!NK: Summer Carnival	60,432 / 60,432	$9,073,294	
October 9, 2024	Travis Scott	Sheck Wes Playboi Carti Future	Circus Maximus Tour	61,728 / 61,728	$8,676,707	
May 8, 2025	Kendrick Lamar; SZA	Mustard	Grand National Tour	107,466 / 107,466	$24,759,838	
May 9, 2025	Kendrick Lamar; SZA	Mustard	Grand National Tour	107,466 / 107,466	$24,759,838	
May 15, 2025	Shakira		Las Mujeres Ya No Lloran World Tour	99,876 / 99,876	$13,798,380	
May 16, 2025	Shakira	Pitbull	Las Mujeres Ya No Lloran World Tour	99,876 / 99,876	$13,798,380	
May 22, 2025	Beyoncé		Cowboy Carter Tour	250,085 / 250,085	$70,284,615	• The most concerts performed by a single artist at MetLife Stadium with 12 shows to date. • The most shows played on a single concert tour at the stadium, with five shows. • The highest ticket sales on a single tour run with over 250,085 tickets sold. • The highest grossing reported concert tour at the stadium ($70,284,615).
May 24, 2025	Beyoncé		Cowboy Carter Tour	250,085 / 250,085	$70,284,615	• The most concerts performed by a single artist at MetLife Stadium with 12 shows to date. • The most shows played on a single concert tour at the stadium, with five shows. • The highest ticket sales on a single tour run with over 250,085 tickets sold. • The highest grossing reported concert tour at the stadium ($70,284,615).
May 25, 2025	Beyoncé		Cowboy Carter Tour	250,085 / 250,085	$70,284,615	• The most concerts performed by a single artist at MetLife Stadium with 12 shows to date. • The most shows played on a single concert tour at the stadium, with five shows. • The highest ticket sales on a single tour run with over 250,085 tickets sold. • The highest grossing reported concert tour at the stadium ($70,284,615).
May 28, 2025	Beyoncé		Cowboy Carter Tour	250,085 / 250,085	$70,284,615	• The most concerts performed by a single artist at MetLife Stadium with 12 shows to date. • The most shows played on a single concert tour at the stadium, with five shows. • The highest ticket sales on a single tour run with over 250,085 tickets sold. • The highest grossing reported concert tour at the stadium ($70,284,615).
May 29, 2025	Beyoncé		Cowboy Carter Tour	250,085 / 250,085	$70,284,615	• The most concerts performed by a single artist at MetLife Stadium with 12 shows to date. • The most shows played on a single concert tour at the stadium, with five shows. • The highest ticket sales on a single tour run with over 250,085 tickets sold. • The highest grossing reported concert tour at the stadium ($70,284,615).
June 5, 2025	The Weeknd	Playboi Carti; Mike Dean	After Hours til Dawn Tour	162,831 / 162,831	$29,796,461	
June 6, 2025	The Weeknd	Playboi Carti; Mike Dean	After Hours til Dawn Tour	162,831 / 162,831	$29,796,461	
June 7, 2025	The Weeknd	Playboi Carti; Mike Dean	After Hours til Dawn Tour	162,831 / 162,831	$29,796,461	
July 18, 2025	Zach Bryan	Kings of Leon The Front Bottoms	Quittin’ Time Tour			Bruce Springsteen appeared as special guest on Night 3 to sing “Atlantic City” with Zach Bryan and Caleb Followell.
July 19, 2025	Zach Bryan	Kings of Leon The Front Bottoms	Quittin’ Time Tour			Bruce Springsteen appeared as special guest on Night 3 to sing “Atlantic City” with Zach Bryan and Caleb Followell.
July 20, 2025	Zach Bryan	Kings of Leon The Front Bottoms	Quittin’ Time Tour			Bruce Springsteen appeared as special guest on Night 3 to sing “Atlantic City” with Zach Bryan and Caleb Followell.
August 9, 2025	My Chemical Romance	Death Cab for Cutie; Thursday	Long Live The Black Parade			
August 10, 2025	Jonas Brothers	The All-American Rejects; Marshmello	Jonas 20: Living the Dream Tour	55,179 / 55,179	$6,813,616	Special Guests: Switchfoot, Jesse Mccartney, Dean Lewis, Demi Lovato
August 12, 2025	Chris Brown	Summer Walker; Bryson Tiller	Breezy Bowl XX	107,256 / 107,256	$15,001,827	
August 13, 2025	Chris Brown	Summer Walker; Bryson Tiller	Breezy Bowl XX	107,256 / 107,256	$15,001,827	
August 27, 2025	System of a Down; Korn	Polyphia; Wisp	System Of A Down & Korn with special guest Polyphia			System of a Down’s first New Jersey show since 2012 and first New York City show in 20 years. During their songs “Toxicity” and “Sugar” fans lit flares in the mosh pit.
August 28, 2025	System of a Down; Korn	Polyphia; Wisp	System Of A Down & Korn with special guest Polyphia			Night 2
August 31, 2025	Oasis	Cage the Elephant	Oasis Live '25 Tour			
September 1, 2025	Oasis	Cage the Elephant	Oasis Live '25 Tour			
August 1, 2026	BTS		Arirang World Tour			
August 2, 2026	BTS		Arirang World Tour			
August 7, 2026	Usher; Chris Brown		The R&B Tour			
August 8, 2026	Usher; Chris Brown		The R&B Tour			
August 12, 2026	Guns N' Roses	Public Enemy	2026 World Tour			
August 21, 2026	Bruno Mars	DJ Pee .Wee; Raye	The Romantic Tour			
August 22, 2026	Bruno Mars	DJ Pee .Wee; Raye	The Romantic Tour			
August 25, 2026	Bruno Mars	DJ Pee .Wee; Raye	The Romantic Tour			
August 26, 2026	Bruno Mars	DJ Pee .Wee; Raye	The Romantic Tour			
September 4, 2026	Ed Sheeran	Macklemore; Lukas Graham; Biird	Loop Tour			Following public pressure over comments Macklemore made about the Israeli–Palestinian conflict, he was controversially removed from the tour.
September 5, 2026	Ed Sheeran	Macklemore; Lukas Graham; Biird	Loop Tour			Following public pressure over comments Macklemore made about the Israeli–Palestinian conflict, he was controversially removed from the tour.
September 11, 2026	Bigbang		XX: Cosmos World Tour			
September 17, 2026	Karol G		Viajando Por El Mundo Tropitour			
September 18, 2026	Karol G		Viajando Por El Mundo Tropitour			
October 2, 2026	AC/DC	Foo Fighters	Power Up Tour			Rescheduled from September 25, 2026 due to September 2026 nor'easter. Foo Fighters announced as support shortly after.
October 15, 2026	Usher Chris Brown		The R&B Tour			
May 14, 2027	Zach Bryan	John Fogerty; Fey Fili	Young Manhood and Other Donatable Organs Tour			
May 15, 2027	Zach Bryan	John Fogerty; Fey Fili	Young Manhood and Other Donatable Organs Tour			
June 29, 2027	Stray Kids		Run It World Tour			

=== Other events ===
The stadium hosted the 12th Siyum HaShas, a celebration of the completion of the Talmud through the 7 1/2-year Daf Yomi study program, on August 1, 2012. At 93,000 seats, it was the highest capacity crowd in the stadium's history, due to on-field seating and a ticket sell-out. The siyum was a Department of Homeland Security level two security event, the most critical short of a presidential visit. On January 1, 2020, it hosted the 13th Siyum HaShas. On June 6, 2027, it will host the 14th Siyum HaShas.

In 2014, two of the "Keep Seeking First God's Kingdom!" International Conventions of Jehovah's Witnesses were held at the stadium.

On July 14 and 15, 2017, the stadium hosted the 18th International Indian Film Academy Awards, the Oscars of Bollywood, for the first time.

On January 16, 2018, the stadium hosted the inaugural ball for newly elected New Jersey Governor Phil Murphy.

== NFL attendances ==
In 2023, the New York Giants and the New York Jets were among the NFL teams with the highest average home attendance. Only the Dallas Cowboys drew a higher average home attendance, with 93,594 in 8 home games, although the average home attendance of the Cowboys was 80,000 without people watching on screens at the party decks. The table shows the average home attendances of the Giants and the Jets at MetLife Stadium.

NFL team	Year	Home Games	Average Attendance
New York Giants	2025	8	80,557
New York Jets	2025	8	73,666
New York Giants	2024	9	78,470
New York Jets	2024	7	78,789
New York Giants	2023	8	79,307
New York Jets	2023	9	77,890
New York Giants	2022	9	76,474
New York Jets	2022	8	78,009
New York Giants	2021	8	73,882
New York Jets	2021	9	71,676
New York Giants	2020	8	0
New York Jets	2020	8	0
New York Giants	2019	8	74,664
New York Jets	2019	8	78,523
New York Giants	2018	8	76,940
New York Jets	2018	8	77,982
New York Giants	2017	8	77,179
New York Jets	2017	8	77,562
New York Giants	2016	8	78,789
New York Jets	2016	8	78,160
New York Giants	2015	8	79,001
New York Jets	2015	8	78,160
New York Giants	2014	8	78,967
New York Jets	2014	8	78,160
New York Giants	2013	8	80,148
New York Jets	2013	8	76,957
New York Giants	2012	8	80,495
New York Jets	2012	8	79,088
New York Giants	2011	8	79,475
New York Jets	2011	8	78,986
New York Giants	2010	8	79,019
New York Jets	2010	8	78,596

== Incidents ==
On July 5, 2026, during the 2026 FIFA World Cup, a bomb threat was made during the match between Brazil and Norway. Two individuals, including 26-year-old Amar Ramkissoon, sent FIFA a text message at around 4:15 p.m. ET threatening to "blow up" the area. Authorities quickly tracked the threat, leading New Jersey State Police to arrest and charge Ramkissoon with creating a false public alarm and making terroristic threats. The threat ultimately did not disrupt the match.

== See also ==
- New Jersey music venues by capacity
- New Jersey Meadowlands

Events and tenants
Preceded by Giants Stadium	Home of the New York Giants; 2010–present	Incumbent
Preceded by Giants Stadium	Home of the New York Jets; 2010–present	Incumbent
Preceded by first stadium	Home of the New York Guardians; 2020	Succeeded by Camping World Stadium
Preceded by Mercedes-Benz Superdome (XLVII)	Host of the Super Bowl; 2014 (XLVIII)	Succeeded by University of Phoenix Stadium (XLIX)
Preceded by Sun Life Stadium; Mercedes-Benz Superdome	Host of WrestleMania; 2013 (29); 2019 (35)	Succeeded by Mercedes-Benz Superdome; WWE Performance Center
Preceded by Estadio Nacional; Santiago	Copa América Centenario; Final venue 2016	Succeeded by Maracanã Stadium; Rio de Janeiro
Preceded by Lusail Stadium; Lusail	FIFA World Cup; Final venue 2026	Succeeded by TBD; TBD
