= Amor Desperdiciado =

2007 single by with Frank Reyes

Single by Frank Reyes

from the album Te Regalo el Mar
- Released: September 19, 2007
- Recorded: 2007
- Genre: Bachata
- Length: 4:09
- Label: JVN Musical Inc
- Producers: Juan Hidalgo; Nelson Estevez

Frank Reyes singles chronology
"Ven, Que Se Muere Mi Alma" (2007)	"Amor Desperdiciado" (2007)	"Te Regalo El Mar" (2008)

"Amor Desperdiciado" (Wasted Love) is a song by Dominican singer-songwriter, Frank Reyes. It was released on September 19, 2007, as the second single for his fourteenth studio album, Te Regalo el Mar.

== Charts ==
Chart (2007)	Peak position
US Hot Latin Songs (Billboard)	33
US Latin Rhythm Songs (Billboard)	28
US Tropical Songs (Billboard)	1
