= Dosis De Amor =

Studio album by Frank Reyes
- Released: December 20, 2005
- Recorded: 2005
- Genre: Bachata
- Length: 46:01
- Labels: J & N Records; JVN Musical Inc.

Frank Reyes chronology
From Santo Domingo Live (2005)	Dosis De Amor (2005)	Pienso En Ti (2006)

Singles from Dosis De Amor
- 1. "El Alcohol" Released: 2005; 2. "Dosis De Amor" Released: 2005; 3. "Princesa" Released: 2006

Professional ratings
Review scores
Source	Rating
AllMusic	4/5 stars

Dosis De Amor (English: Dose of Love) is the twelfth studio album by Dominican singer Frank Reyes. It was released on December 20, 2005, by J & N Records and JVN Musical Inc. Eight of the twelve tracks were successful singles, with seven of them having their own music videos. One of the singles, "Princesa", peaked at number 1 on the Billboard Tropical Airplay chart.

== Track listing ==
No.	Title	Length
1.	"Se Fue de Mí (Aunque Respiro, No Vivo)"	2:50
2.	"El Alcohol"	4:16
3.	"Dosis De Amor"	3:25
4.	"Es Mentira Tu Amor"	4:15
5.	"Princesa"	3:25
6.	"Compadre"	4:54
7.	"Que Voy A Hacer Sin Tí"	4:22
8.	"Llévate la Cama Pa' la Calle" (Don Miguelo & Indhira)	3:34
9.	"Te Fuiste Sin Decir Nada"	3:08
10.	"Presumida"	3:45
11.	"Tú Me Pides Que Te Olvide"	4:19
12.	"Lo Que Vida Te Dá"	3:42
Total length:		46:01

== Charts ==
Chart (2006)	Peak position
US Tropical Albums (Billboard)	13
