= The Last Tour =

2009–11 concert tour by Aventura

- Tour by Aventura
- Promotional Poster of the Santo Domingo Concert in 2010
- Associated albums: The Last
- Start date: July 31, 2009
- End date: March 7, 2011
- Legs: 6
- No. of shows: 37 in United States; 2 in Canada; 41 in Latin America; 80 Total

Aventura concert chronology
- K.O.B. Live Tour (2007-2008); The Last Tour; Aventura Reunion In NYC (2016)

The Last Tour was a world tour by the bachata group Aventura to promote their final studio album The Last before their split. The Last Tour started on July 31, 2009, and ended on March 7, 2011. It was their last tour as a group, until their 2016 residency and 2020 Inmortal Tour of US arenas.

The Last Tour was the band's most successful tour and the longest. It broke attendance records in Latin America, including 60,000 fans in Santo Domingo at Estadio Olímpico Félix Sánchez.

In the United States the tour was a success. In an article, Billboard stated that in the United States Aventura's 2009-10 shows averaged $675,000 and 9,358 tickets per show. In 2010, Billboard named it the top Latin tour of 2010 with a total gross of US$18.1 million over 27 shows with 15 sellouts and 253,777 attendance. The tour also broke the record of the most consecutive sold-out concerts in Madison Square Garden by a Latin artist.

== Tour dates ==
List of concerts, showing date, city, country, venue, tickets sold, number of available tickets and amount of grossing revenue
Date	City	Country	Venue
Latin America
July 31, 2009	Bogota	Colombia	Coliseo El Campin
August 1, 2009 (Note: This Concert was of the Festival Internacional de la Frontera de Cucuta 2009)	Cucuta	Colombia	Estadio General Santander
August 6, 2009	Armenia	Colombia	Estadio Centenario
August 7, 2009 (Note: This Concert was co-headlined by Daddy Yankee)	Medellin	Colombia	Estadio Atanasio Girardo
November 7, 2009 (Note: This concert was co-headlined by Daddy Yankee)	Cali	Colombia	Estadio Pascual Guerrero
November 15, 2009 (Note: This concert was co-headlined by Daddy Yankee)	Cartagena	Colombia	Estadio Jaime Moron
North America
November 20, 2009	Rosemont	United States	Allstate Arena
November 22, 2009	Fairfax	United States	EagleBank Arena
November 25, 2009	Duluth	United States	Infinite Energy Arena
November 27, 2009	Atlantic City	United States	Hard Rock Live at Etess Arena
November 28, 2009	Boston	United States	Agganis Arena
November 29, 2009	Atlantic City	United States	Hard Rock Live at Etess Arena
December 2, 2009	Grand Prairie	United States	The Theatre at Grand
December 4, 2009	Houston	United States	Toyota Center
December 10, 2009	Las Vegas	United States	The Joint
December 11, 2009	Glendale	United States	Gila River Arena
December 12, 2009	San Diego	United States	Pechanga Arena
December 13, 2009	San Jose	United States	SAP Center
December 15, 2009	Los Angeles	United States	Staples Centes
December 16, 2009	Los Angeles	United States	Staples Centes
December 18, 2009	Orlando	United States	Amway Arena
December 19, 2009	Miami	United States	American Airlines Arena
January 20, 2010	New York	United States	Madison Square Garden
January 21, 2010	New York	United States	Madison Square Garden
January 30, 2010	Uncasville	United States	Mohegan Sun Arena
February 1, 2010	New York	United States	Madison Square Garden
February 2, 2010	New York	United States	Madison Square Garden
Latin America
February 13, 2010	Santo Domingo	Dominican Republic	Estadio Olimpico Felix Sanchez
April 22, 2010	Puerto la Cruz	Venezuela	Estadio Jose Antonio Anzoategui
April 23, 2010	Maturin	Venezuela	Estadio Monumental de Maturin
April 24, 2010	Puerto Ordaz	Venezuela	Centro Italo Venezolano de Guayana
April 28, 2010	Maracaibo	Venezuela	Palacio de Eventos de Venezuela
April 30, 2010	Mérida	Venezuela	Estadio Olimpico Metropolitano
May 1, 2010	Valencia	Venezuela	Forum Valencia
May 2, 2010	Caracas	Venezuela	Poliedo de Caracas
May 4, 2010	Guayaquil	Ecuador	Estadio Modelo Alberto Spencer Herra
May 6, 2010	Quito	Ecuador	Estadio Olimpico Atahualpa
May 8, 2010	Cuenca	Ecuador	Estadio Alejandro Serrano Aguilar
May 12, 2010	Lima	Peru	Explanada del Monumental
May 15, 2010	La Paz	Bolivia	Estadio Hernando Siles
May 19, 2010	Santiago	Chile	Movistar Arena
May 22, 2010	Asuncion	Paraguay	Estadio Defensores del Charco
May 24, 2010	Buenos Aires	Argentina	Luna Park
May 25, 2010	Buenos Aires	Argentina	Luna Park
June 2, 2010	Mexico City	Mexico	Auditorio Nacional
June 3, 2010	Mexico City	Mexico	Auditorio Nacional
June 4, 2010	Zapopan	Mexico	Auditorio Telmex
June 6, 2010	Mexico City	Mexico	Audito Nacional
North America
June 16, 2010	Rosemont	United States	Allstate Arena
June 17, 2010	Kansas City	United States	Sprint Center
June 19, 2010	Stockton	United States	Stockton Arena
June 20, 2010	Fresno	United States	Save Mart Center
June 23, 2010	Anaheim	United States	Honda Center
June 26, 2010	El Paso	United States	El Paso County Coliseum
June 30, 2010	Dallas	United States	American Airlines Center
July 1, 2010	Houston	United States	Toyota Center
July 2, 2010	San Antonio	United States	AT&T Center
July 3, 2010	Hidalgo	United States	Payne Arena
July 6, 2010	Hollywood	United States	Hard Rock Live
July 7, 2010	Hollywood	United States	Hard Rock Live
July 8, 2010	Charlotte	United States	Bojangles Coliseum
July 9, 2010	Providence	United States	Dunkin Donuts Center
July 10, 2010	East Rutherford	United States	Meandwlands Arena
July 11, 2010	East Rutherford	United States	Meandwlands Arena
Latin America
October 2, 2010	Mexico City	Mexico	Palacio de los Deportes
October 5, 2010	Monterrey	Mexico	Auditorio citiBanamex
October 6, 2010	Monterrey	Mexico	Auditorio citiBanamex
October 8, 2010	Zapopan	Mexico	Foro Alterno
October 14, 2010	Guatemala City	Guatemala	Forum Mundo E.
October 15, 2010	San Salvador	El Salvador	Gimnasio Nacional
October 17, 2010	Tegucigalpa	Honduras	Estadio Chochi Sosa
December 3, 2010	San Juan	Puerto Rico	Coliseo de Puerto Rico
December 4, 2010	San Juan	Puerto Rico	Coliseo de Puerto Rico
December 5, 2010	San Juan	Puerto Rico	Coliseo de Puerto Rico
North America
February 11. 2011	Brampton	Canada	Powerade Center
February 12, 2011	Brampton	Canada	Powerade Center
Latin America
February 19, 2011	Buenos Aires	Argentina	Estadio GEBA
February 24, 2011	Santiago	Chile	Estadio Bicentenario Municipal de la Florida
March 7, 2011	Puerto Cabello	Venezuela	Aeropuerto General Bartolome Salom

=== Box office data ===
City	Country	Attendance	Box office
Anaheim	United States	12,415 / 12,415 (100%)	$911,093
Rosemont	United States	14,758 / 14,758 (100%)	$1,194,745
Atlantic City	United States	8,907 / 9,776 (91%)	$754,525
Duluth	United States	9,055 / 9,055 (100%)	$669,092
New York	United States	72,000 / 72,000 (100%)	$5,693,412
Los Angeles	United States	27,374 / 27,374 (100%)	$2,370,544
San Juan	Puerto Rico	26,948 / 28,258 (95%)	$1,833,098
Ciudad de Mexico	Mexico	28,782 / 29,049 (99%)	$1,033,260
Totals		200,239 / 202,685 (99%)	$14,459,769
