= Noche de Pasión =

Studio album by Frank Reyes
- Released: July 30, 2014
- Recorded: 2013–2014
- Genre: Bachata
- Length: 41:56
- Label: Venevision International Music; Universal Music Latin Entertainment; Frank Reyes & Associates
- Producer: Francis Bencosme; Camilo Bencosme; Daniel Monción; Pedro Acosta

Frank Reyes chronology
Soy Tuyo (2012)	Noche de Pasión (2014)	1 (2015)

Singles from Noche de Pasión
- 1. "Que Hay de Tu Vida" Released: 2014; 2. "Noche de Pasión" Released: 2014; 3. "Ya Te Olvide" Released: 2014; 4. "Como Sanar" Released: 2015

Alternate Cover
- 2015 re-edition cover

Noche de Pasión (Night of Passion) is the seventeenth studio album by Dominican singer Frank Reyes. It was released on July 30, 2014, by Venevision International Music and Universal Music Latin Entertainment. It featured Dominican singer Alexandra.

== Singles ==
One of the singles, "Noche de Pasión", peaked at No. 31 on the Billboard Hot Latin Songs chart and No. 29 on the Billboard Latin Airplay chart. Other singles released in support of the album are "Que Hay de Tu Vida", "Ya Te Olvide" and "Como Sanar".

== Track listing ==
Standard
No.	Title	Length
1.	"Ya Te Olvide"	4:12
2.	"Limon y Sal"	3:42
3.	"Noche de Pasión"	4:16
4.	"Como Sanar"	3:27
5.	"Enséñame a Olvidarte"	4:11
6.	"Se Acabó el Amor (Se Nos Perdio el Amor)" (featuring Alexandra)	3:16
7.	"Que Le Hiciste a Mi Vida"	3:46
8.	"Olvídame Tu"	4:09
9.	"Vida"	3:18
10.	"Tanto Amor Para Que"	3:48
11.	"Que Hay de Tu Vida"	3:56
Total length:		41:56

- The song "Se Acabó el Amor" is also known as "Que Está Pasando Entre Los Dos".

== Charts ==
Chart (2014)	Peak position
US Tropical Albums (Billboard)	10
