= Devuélveme Mi Libertad =

Studio album by Frank Reyes
- Released: September 23, 2016
- Recorded: 2015–2016
- Genre: Bachata
- Length: 39:41
- Label: Frank Reyes & Associates

Frank Reyes chronology
1 (2015)	Devuélveme Mi Libertad (2016)	Quien Eres Tú (2019)

Singles from Devuélveme Mi Libertad
- 1. "Lejos de Tu Vida" Released: July 1, 2016; 2. "Fecha de Vencimiento" Released: September 28, 2017

Devuélveme Mi Libertad (Give Me Back My Freedom) is the eighteenth studio album by Dominican singer Frank Reyes. It was released on September 23, 2016. The album was supported by the singles "Lejos de Tu Vida" and "Fecha de Vencimiento".

== Track listing ==
Standard
No.	Title	Length
1.	"Amor Real"	3:16
2.	"Como Olvidarte"	2:50
3.	"Devuélveme Mi Libertad"	3:00
4.	"Fecha de Vencimiento"	3:32
5.	"Lejos de Tu Vida"	3:18
6.	"Lloro"	3:33
7.	"Mujer de las Mil Batallas"	3:24
8.	"Quien de los Dos"	3:36
9.	"Se Te Olvidó" (Bachata Version)	2:52
10.	"Se Te Olvidó" (Balada Version)	3:34
11.	"Solo Tú"	3:11
12.	"Veneno"	3:27
Total length:		39:41

== Charts ==
Chart (2016)	Peak position
US Tropical Albums (Billboard)	16

== Certifications ==
Region	Certification	Certified units/sales
United States (RIAA)	Gold (Latin)	30,000^{‡}
^{‡} Sales+streaming figures based on certification alone.
