= Aventurero =

Studio album by Frank Reyes
- Released: February 12, 2021
- Recorded: 2019–2021
- Genre: Bachata
- Length: 43:27
- Label: Frank Reyes & Associates

Frank Reyes chronology
Solo Merengue, Vol. 17 (2019)	Aventurero (2021)	Mi Historia Musical, Vol. 1 (2023)

Singles from Aventurero
- 1. "Decidí" Released: February 14, 2020; 2. "Como Hojas Al Viento" Released: August 14, 2020; 3. "Aventurero" Released: January 29, 2021; 4. "Egoista" Released: September 3, 2021; 5. "Corazón de Acero" Released: February 1, 2022

Aventurero (Adventurer) is the nineteenth studio album by Dominican singer Frank Reyes. It was released on February 12, 2021. The album was originally set to release on Valentine's Day, but decided to release it two days before it. The album is supported by the singles "Decidí", "Como Hojas Al Viento", "Aventurero", "Egoista" and "Corazón De Acero".

== Track listing ==
No.	Title	Length
1.	"Aventurero"	3:29
2.	"Agradecido"	3:20
3.	"Mágicas Princesas"	4:21
4.	"Egoista"	3:14
5.	"Corazòn de Acero"	4:10
6.	"No Tengas Miedo"	4:02
7.	"El Martillo"	4:00
8.	"Dame Tu Amor" (featuring Annerys Acosta)	3:47
9.	"Te Echo de Menos"	3:05
10.	"Historia Real"	3:32
11.	"Como Hojas Al Viento"	3:10
12.	"Decidí"	3:14
Total length:		43:27
