= Déjame Entrar En Ti =

Studio album by Frank Reyes
- Released: July 30, 2002
- Recorded: 2002
- Genre: Bachata
- Length: 48:06
- Label: J & N Records; JVN Musical Inc.

Frank Reyes chronology
Bachata De Gala (2002)	Déjame Entrar En Ti (2002)	Cuando Se Quiere Se Puede (2004)

Singles from Déjame Entrar En Ti
- 1. "Nada De Nada" Released: 2002; 2. "Asi Es La Vida" Released: 2002; 3. "Déjame Entrar En Ti" Released: 2002

Déjame Entrar En Ti (Let Me Enter You) is the tenth studio album by Dominican singer Frank Reyes. It was released on July 30, 2002, by J & N Records and JVN Musical Inc. The album became a huge success as nine of the eleven tracks became huge hits with each of them having their own music videos. One of the singles, "Nada De Nada", peaked at number 10 on the Billboard Tropical Airplay chart. Two music videos were made for the single.

== Track listing ==
No.	Title	Length
1.	"Nada De Nada"	4:09
2.	"Asi Es La Vida"	3:45
3.	"No Te Olvides De Mi"	4:17
4.	"Dejame Entrar En Ti"	3:48
5.	"Contigo O Sin Ti"	4:51
6.	"Que Te Vayas"	4:37
7.	"Adolescente"	4:13
8.	"Necesito Decirte"	3:44
9.	"Como Llora Mi Alma"	4:22
10.	"Marapica"	5:03
11.	"No Te Vayas"	5:11
Total length:		48:06

== Charts ==
Chart (2002)	Peak position
US Top Latin Albums (Billboard)	45
US Tropical Albums (Billboard)	6
