= Aventura Reunion In NYC =

2016 reunion concerts by Aventura

- Tour by Aventura
- Start date: February 4, 2016
- End date: February 29, 2016
- No. of shows: 21

Aventura concert chronology
- The Last Tour (2009–2010); Aventura Reunion In NYC (2016); Inmortal Tour (2020–2021)

Aventura Reunion In NYC was a month-long residency by music group Aventura that took place at United Palace in New York City. The concerts started on February 4, 2016, and ended on February 28, 2016. The concerts served as a reunion for the band following their breakup in 2011 to pursue their individual musical careers. Initially only four shows were announced, however more shows were added due to the high demand.

Billed as their last shows together, the residency was a commercial success with all of the concerts sold out. The concerts received positive reviews by fans, with critics praising the sound quality on the venue and the band's stage presence.

== Background ==
In April 2009, Aventura released their fifth and last studio album The Last, which became the best-selling Latin album in the United States for 2009 and 2010. They promoted the record with The Last Tour (2009–11). The group promised to come back in 2013, however this did not happen. Following that, the band split to individually focus on their musical careers. The lead singer Romeo Santos released Formula Vol. 1 (2011) and Formula Vol. 2 (2014) with great success. In July 2014, the group reunited to perform at Romeo Santos's concert at New York's Yankee Stadium.

On December 2, 2015, the dates of the reunion concerts at the United Palace were revealed. According to the press release, these shows would be their last concerts together.

== Overview ==
Stage and Sound

All of the concerts were performed at the United Palace in New York City. The venue was selected due the large Dominican population around the location of the venue, Washington Heights. The audio spectrum inside the venue consisted of three K1-SB subs flown over 10 K2 enclosures per side, supplemented by SB28 subs ground-stacked below, plus X8 coaxials as frontfills and ARCS II enclosures as outfills, deployed an L-Acoustics system. The system helped the sound inside the venue to be focused on the bands instruments despite the screaming fans.

== Reception ==
The residency received positive reviews by fans and critics alike. Isabela Herrera from Remezcla gave a positive review, praising the band's presence on stage and charisma in an article titled "Aventura Reunites and Keeps the Spirit of the Heights Alive, Even in the Age of Gentrification". Krystyna Chavez from Billboard gave a 4.5 out 5 and stated in her review that the concert were and parranda from start to finish and praised the setlist, writing "The evening was a reminder of why we fell in love with Aventura in the first place".

== Tour dates ==
List of concerts, showing date, city, country, venue, opening acts, tickets sold, number of available tickets, and grossing revenue
Date	City	Country	Venue	Attendance	Revenue
North America
February 4, 2016	New York	United States	United Palace	3,350 (per show)	–
February 5, 2016	New York	United States	United Palace	3,350 (per show)	–
February 6, 2016	New York	United States	United Palace	3,350 (per show)	–
February 7, 2016	New York	United States	United Palace	3,350 (per show)	–
February 10, 2016	New York	United States	United Palace	3,350 (per show)	–
February 11, 2016	New York	United States	United Palace	3,350 (per show)	–
February 12, 2016	New York	United States	United Palace	3,350 (per show)	–
February 13, 2016	New York	United States	United Palace	3,350 (per show)	–
February 14, 2016	New York	United States	United Palace	3,350 (per show)	–
February 17, 2016	New York	United States	United Palace	3,350 (per show)	–
February 18, 2016	New York	United States	United Palace	3,350 (per show)	–
February 19, 2016	New York	United States	United Palace	3,350 (per show)	–
February 20, 2016	New York	United States	United Palace	3,350 (per show)	–
February 21, 2016	New York	United States	United Palace	3,350 (per show)	–
February 24, 2016	New York	United States	United Palace	3,350 (per show)	–
February 25, 2016	New York	United States	United Palace	3,350 (per show)	–
February 26, 2016	New York	United States	United Palace	3,350 (per show)	–
February 27, 2016	New York	United States	United Palace	3,350 (per show)	–
February 28, 2016	New York	United States	United Palace	3,350 (per show)	–
February 29, 2016	New York	United States	United Palace	3,350 (per show)	–
Total					
