= Noche de Pasión (song) =

2014 single by with Frank Reyes

Single by Frank Reyes

from the album Noche de Pasión
- Released: July 24, 2014
- Recorded: 2014
- Genre: Bachata
- Length: 4:16
- Label: Venevision International Music; Universal Music Latin Entertainment; Frank Reyes & Associates

Frank Reyes singles chronology
"Que Hay de Tu Vida" (2014)	"Noche de Pasión" (2014)	"Ya Te Olvide" (2014)

Music video
- "Noche de Pasión" on YouTube

"Noche de Pasión" (Night of Passion) is a song by Dominican singer-songwriter, Frank Reyes. It was released on July 24, 2014, under Venevision International Music and Universal Music Latin Entertainment. It serves as the second single for his seventeenth studio album, Noche de Pasión (2014).

== Charts ==
Chart (2014–15)	Peak position
Dominican Republic Bachata (Monitor Latino)	1
Dominican Republic General (Monitor Latino)	2
US Hot Latin Songs (Billboard)	31
US Latin Airplay (Billboard)	29
