= Te Regalo el Mar =

Te Regalo El Mar

Studio album by Frank Reyes
- Released: September 14, 2007
- Recorded: 2007
- Genre: Bachata
- Length: 34:47
- Label: J & N Records; JVN Musical Inc.

Frank Reyes chronology
Tour 2007 (2007)	Te Regalo El Mar (2007)	Sigue Tu Vida (2009)

Singles from Te Regalo el Mar
- 1. "Ven, Que Se Muere Mi Alma" Released: 2007; 2. "Amor Desperdiciado" Released: 2008; 3. "Te Regalo El Mar" Released: 2008

Te Regalo El Mar (I Give You The Sea) is the fourteenth studio album by Dominican singer Frank Reyes. It was released on September 14, 2007, by J & N Records and JVN Musical Inc. The album was a success with two of its singles peaking on the Billboard charts. One of the singles, "Te Regalo El Mar", peaked at number 7 on the Tropical Airplay chart. Another single is the song "Amor Desperdiciado", which peaked at number 1 on the same chart. It also peaked at 33 on the Hot Latin Songs chart and number 28 on the Latin Rhythm Airplay chart.

== Track listing ==
Standard
No.	Title	Length
1.	"Amor Desperdiciado"	4:09
2.	"No Te Vayas"	3:44
3.	"Me Curaré"	3:19
4.	"Ven, Que Se Muere Mi Alma"	3:54
5.	"Dime Dónde Estas"	4:15
6.	"Me Gustas"	4:11
7.	"Te Regalo El Mar"	3:39
8.	"No Me Importa, No"	3:40
9.	"Tan Lejos de Tí"	3:52
Total length:		34:47

Bonus Track
No.	Title	Length
10.	"Con Tu Regreso"	3:27
Total length:		38:14

== Charts ==
Chart (2007)	Peak position
US Tropical Albums (Billboard)	18
