= Mi Historia Musical, Vol. 1 =

Compilation album by Frank Reyes
- Released: June 23, 2023
- Recorded: 2023
- Genre: Bachata
- Length: 47:45
- Label: Frank Reyes & Associates

Frank Reyes chronology
| Aventurero (2021) | Mi Historia Musical, Vol. 1 (2023) | Mi Historia Musical, Vol. 2 (2023) |

Singles from Mi Historia Musical, Vol. 1
- 1. "Me Haces Falta Amor (2023 version)" Released: August 2, 2023

Mi Historia Musical, Vol. 1 (English: My Musical History, Vol. 1) is a compilation album by Dominican singer Frank Reyes. It was released on June 23, 2023. It is the instalment of the Mi Historia Musical (My Musical History) series. The series is based on remakes of many songs throughout Reyes' career. Many of them containing remakes of songs from his early career. Its main single is the 2023 version of the song "Me Haces Falta Amor". The music video was released on August 2, 2023. The original version of the song is from his 1991 debut album Tú Serás Mi Reina.

== Track listing ==
| No. | Title | Length |
|---|---|---|
| 1. | "Me Haces Falta Amor" | 3:25 |
| 2. | "Con Tu Regreso" | 3:27 |
| 3. | "Te Tengo Que Dejar" | 4:49 |
| 4. | "El Curandero" | 3:39 |
| 5. | "Suspiros de Amantes" | 4:29 |
| 6. | "Eres Tu la Elegida" | 3:37 |
| 7. | "No Era Cierto" | 3:43 |
| 8. | "Con El Amor No Se Juega" | 4:33 |
| 9. | "Esperandote (Vuelve Otra Vez)" | 4:29 |
| 10. | "Se Que Lloraras" | 3:52 |
| 11. | "Dame Algo de Ti" | 3:20 |
| 12. | "Bella Como Una Flor" | 3:18 |
| Total length: | | 47:45 |

- Each song is listed as the 2023 versions of them as these are remade songs.
