= Frank Reyes =

Dominican singer (born 1969)

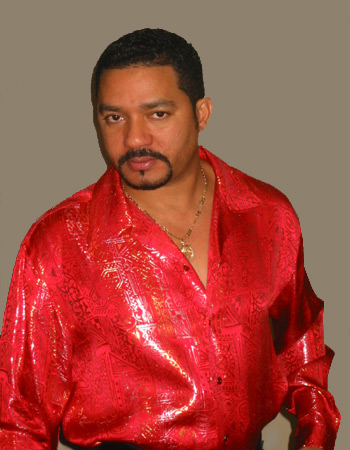

Background information
- Also known as: El Principe De La Bachata (The Prince of Bachata)
- Born: Francisco López Reyes; 4 June 1969 (age 57); Tenares, Dominican Republic
- Genre: Bachata
- Occupation: Singer
- Years active: 1991–present
- Labels: J & N Records

Frank Reyes (born Francisco López Reyes on June 4, 1969) is a Dominican singer. Known as the Prince of Bachata, he is regarded as one of the best known bachata artists of all time and famous throughout Latin America. He is a 7 time Bachata Artist of the Year winner at the Soberano Awards, making him the most awarded artist in that category. He is known for hits like "Vine a Decirte Adios", "Con el Amor No Se Juega", "Tu Eres Ajena", "Nada De Nada", "Quién Eres Tu", "Princesa", "Amor a Distancia", "Decidí", among others.

== Early life ==
He was born in the town of Tenares in the Dominican Republic. Reyes discovered his musical talent when he was a young boy. He and his brothers started their own musical group and had great singing talent. When he was only 12 years old, he decided to travel to Santo Domingo where he worked hard and had many jobs, always dreaming of having his own business. As he got older, he eventually decided to pursue a music career.

== Career ==
=== Early career (1991–1997) ===
In 1991, Reyes released his debut album Tu Serás Mi Reina. The song featured one of his first successful songs "Como Fui A Enamorarme De Ti". It also featured the song "Voy Pa'lla", which was made famous by Dominican bachata musician Anthony Santos. There has been a dispute on who the song originally belongs to as they both released their own versions in the same year. However, it has been confirm that the song originally belongs to Santos. In 1993, he released his second album titled Si El Amor Condena, Estoy Condenado. It featured the hit song "Se Fue Mi Amor", also titled as "Se Fue Mi Amor Bonito". In 1994, he released the album Bachata Con Categoría, in which he would start calling himself El Principe del Amargue (The Prince of Bitterness). At the time, the genre was mostly based on music about heartbreak and bitterness. From 1995 to 1997, he released three more studio albums with a more modinzed style to his music. Also in 1997, he released his first compilation album Estelares De Frank Reyes, which was based on the best songs from his first two studio albums. This compilation album was a success, thus helping elevate Reyes' career.

=== Changing his style, becoming the Prince of Bachata, and first live album (1998–2001) ===
In 1998, he release the greatest hits album El Princibe de la Bachata: 16 Éxitos. It is based on modernized versions of 16 of his hit songs from his first six studio albums. The album introduced him as the Prince of Bachata and has been known as that ever since. In the same year, he also release his seventh studio album Vine A Decirte Adios, which featured songs like, "Muy Lindo Amor", "Me Dejaste Abandonado", and "Vine A Decirte Adios", the song which the album is named after. Reyes would rejuvenate with a new style which would elevate his career to new heights, thus giving him international recognition.

In 1999, he was awarded Bachata Artist of the Year by the Casandra Awards (now Soberano Awards). In the same year he released his eighth studio album, Extraño Mi Pueblo. It included hit songs like "Orgullo De Mas", "Extraño Mi Pueblo", and "Con El Amor No Se Juega". In 2000, he released his first live album Bachata De Gala. It is based on a concert in which included an orquestra band led by Dominican musician Jorge Taveras. Later that year, he released his ninth studio album "Amor En Silencio", which featured huge hits like "Ya Basta", "De Punta A Punta", and "Tu Eres Ajena", which has two versions, one in bachata and one in balada.

=== Dejame Entrar En Ti, Cuando Se Quiere Se Puede, and Dosis De Amor (2002–2006) ===
In 2002 he was awarded Bachata Artist of the Year for the second time in his career. Later on that year, he released his tenth studio album Déjame Entrar En Ti. It became his best charting album on the Billboard charts as it peaked at number 45 on the Top Latin Albums chart, and at number 6 on the Tropical Albums chart. Nine out of the eleven tracks became huge hits on the radio. One of them was the single "Nada De Nada", which peaked at number 10 on the Billboard Tropical Airplay chart. The success of the album would eventually earn him his third Casandra Awards for Bachata Artist of the Year in 2003.

In 2004, he released his eleventh studio album Cuando Se Quiere Se Puede. The is considered one of his best or the best album of his career as every song in it became huge hits on the radio waves in Dominican Republic and parts of the United States. One of them was the single "Voy A Dejarte De Amar" which peaked at number 12 on the Billboard Tropical Airplay chart. At the 2005 Casandra Awards, it was awarded Album of the Year. He also won Bachata artist of the Year for the fourth time, and Bachata of the Year for the song "Quien Eres Tu", which is one of the album's singles. Also in 2004, he would release his second live album titled En Vivo.

In 2005, he would release his third live album From Santo Domingo Live. It was part of a series of live albums invloning multiple artist, and it was released by J & N Records and JVN Music Inc. They are based on concerts performed live in Santo Domingo, Dominican Republic. In the same year, he released his twelfth studio album Dosis De Amor. It featured Dominican rapper Don Miguelo and Indhira. It peaked at number 13 on the Billboard Tropical Albums chart. Multiple songs from this album became big hits. One of them was the song "Princesa", which was released as a single in 2006 and peaked at number 1 on the Billboard Tropical Airplay chart. This is Reyes' first number 1 hit on the Billboard charts. The song won Bachata of the Year at the 2007 Casandra Awards.

=== Continued success, and Te Regalo El Mar (2006–2011) ===
In mid or late 2006, Reyes released his thirteenth studio album Pienso En Ti. It featured the songs "Navidad", and "Esto No Puede Seguir Asi" and "Pienso En Ti", which is the main single and the song the album is named after. It also included the song "Una Espina Saca Otra" with Dominican singer Alex Bueno. This was his third collaboration in his career and the first collaboration with a bachata artist as at the time collaborations in bachata were rare. This was a remix or cover of a song titled "Vamos a Olvidarla", which he made with Dominican merengue musician, Azucarado, in the year 2000 as part of a compilation album titled Super Bachatazos 2000 by the JVN Music, Inc.

In 2007, he released his fourth live album Tour 2007. Later on that year, he released the album Te Regalo El Mar. It peaked at number 18 on the Billboard Tropical Albums chart. Most of its songs became successful, especially one of its singles, which the album is named after, peaked at number 7 on the Billboard Tropical Airplay chart. Another single, "Amor Desperdiciado", did better on the Billboard charts as it peaked at number 33 on the Hot Latin Songs chart, at number 28 on the Latin Rhythm Airplay chart, and at number 1 on the Tropical Airplay chart.

In 2009, he releases another greatest hits album titled Lo Mejor De Lo Mejor. It featured two tracks that were released as new songs, "Ayer Te Vi Con El" and "Ya No Te Quiero", which was added to his fifteenth studio album, Sigue Tu Vida. The studio album was released later that year and featured hits like "Te Pienso", "Como Olvidar", "Mi Reina", and "Tu No Sabes Lo Que Es El Amor". Some of them weren't released as singles until 2010 and 2011. Also in 2010, he was featured in Ivy Queen's song "Cosas De La Vida" from her seventh studio album, Drama Queen (2010).

=== Soy Tuyo, Noche de Pasión, and Devuélveme Mi Libertad (2012–2018) ===
In 2012, he released the album Soy Tuyo. It included singles "Se Me Olvido Que Te Amaba", "24 Horas" and Amor a Distastancia, which peaked at number 4 on the Billboard Tropical Airplay chart. In 2013, He released a pop rock remix of the song "Que Te Puedo Decir", which is one of his songs from the album. This version featured Dominican pop rock band Huellas Invisibles. It was re-released on August 16, 2019, and it is included in the band's 2020 album Acabando De Empezar. In the same year, Frank, along with Theodoro Reyes, would be featured in the song, Corazón De Hierro with American bachata trio Vena, which consisted of Len Melody and Max Agende from Aventura and Steve Styles from Xtreme. The song peaked at number 5 on the Billboard Tropical Airplay chart.

In 2014, he released the album Noche de Pasión. It featured Dominican bachata singer Alexandra. The album peaked at number 10 on the Billboard Tropical Albums chart. One of its singles, which the album is named after, gained huge international success and on the Billboard charts, it peaked at number 31 on the Hot Latin Songs chart and at 29 on the Latin Airplay chart. It also peaked at number 1 on the Monitor Latino's Dominican Republic Bachata chart. Its 2015 single "Como Sanar" peaked at number 38 on the Hot Latin Songs chart, at number 28 on the Latin Airplay chart, and at number 10 on the Tropical Airplay chart. It was nominated for the VideoClip Awards in the category Best Bachata Music Video. Other successful songs included "Ya Te Olvide", "Enséñame A Olvidarte", "Olvídame Tu", "Mi Vida Sin Ti", "Que Hay de Tu Vida", which was its first single. In 2015, he would once again win Bachata Artist of the Year at the Soberano Awards.

In September 2016, he released the album Devuélveme Mi Libertad. It peaked at number 16 on the Billboard Tropical Albums chart. Two of its singles peaked in the top 10 on the Billboard Tropical Airplay chart, "Fecha De Vencimiento" peaked at number 10 and "Devuélveme Mi Libertad" peaked at number 8. In the same year, he was featured in the Spanglish single "I Wanna Tell You" with Canadian bachata singer Chantel Collado. In 2017, Reyes would win the Soberano Awards for Bachata Artist of the Year for a sixth time. On April 3, 2017, he released the single "Siempre Te Voy A Amar" with Dominican bachata singer Kamilo, also known as K-Milo and Kamilolf. The following year he would win Bachata Artist of the Year for a seventh time making him the most awarded artist in that category. In November of that year, he released the Christmas single "Vientos de Navidad". Later that month, he was featured in the remix of the merengue single "Alegría" with Dominican merengue group Nexo, also known as Nexomuzic.

=== More collaborations, Merengue album, and Aventurero (2019–2021) ===
In 2019, Reyes collaborate with Romeo Santos in the song "Payasos". It was part Santos' fourth studio album Utopía (2019). On the Billboard charts, it peaked at number 32 on the Hot Latin Songs chart and at number 17 on the Tropical Airplay chart. It also peaked at number 3 on the Monitor Latino's Dominican Republic Bachata chart. The music video was released on May 23, 2019. The song was performed live at Santos' MetLife Stadium concert on 21 September 2019. The performance is featured on Santos' live album and concert film Utopía Live from MetLife Stadium (2021). On 28 June 2019, he released the greatest hits album Quien Eres Tú, name after one of his hits songs from the album Cuando Se Quiere Se Puede (2004).

On 8 November 2019, he would release a merengue album titled Solo Merengue, Vol. 17. This was his first merengues only album and the first album with no bachata songs in it. It featured collaborations with Wason Brazobán, Bonny Cepeda, Toño Rosario, and Los Hermanos Rosario. It was supported by the singles "Mi Sorpresa Fuiste Tú", "Quiero Tus Besos", "Por Ti No Sufro", which peaked at number one on the Monitor Latino's Dominican Republic Merengue chart. It also featured a merengue version of "Ya No Te Creo Nada", which is a song from his seventh studio album Vine A Decirte Adiós (1998). Also the song "Quiero Tus Besos" only featured Reyes in the single version. Cepeda was added to the song later on in the album version of the song.

In 2020, he was featured in the song "No Voy A llorar" with Dominican bachata singer Luis Segura. This was a modernized remix of one of Segura's songs and it is part of Segura's collaborative album El Papá De La Bachata, Su Legado - Añoñado 2 (2020). On 14 February 2020, he released the first single for nineteenth studio album titled Decidí. It peaked at number 12 on the Monitor Latino's Dominican Republic General chart and at number one on its Bachata chart. The music video was released on 30 April 2020. On 19 June 2020, he released a pop/balada version of the song "Cómo Olvidarte", which is from his 2016 album Devuélveme Mi Libertad. This version was not featured for the 2021 album. The second single is titled "Como Hojas Al Viento" and it was released on August 14, 2020. It also peaked at number 1 in the same bachata chart. The music video was released on 30 November 2020. On 29 January 2021, he released its third single "Aventurero", which also peaked at number one on the same bachata chart as well. On 12 February 2021, he released the album Aventurero, named after the third single. This album also featured the songs "Egoista" and "Corazón De Acero", which were released as singles later on.

=== More collaborations, Mi Historia Musical, and Descarada (2022–present) ===
On 10 February 2022, he would collaborate in the bachata remix of the song "Por Última Vez" with Dominican merengue singer Eddy Herrera. On June 3, 2022, he released the single "Te Olvidaste De Mi" featuring Dominican bachata singer Rafa Jiménez. It was first released on YouTube and then it would be released on music streaming platforms on 17 June 2022. It peaked at number 10 on the Billboard Tropical Airplay chart. On 1 November 2022, released the Christmas single "Yo No Se Tú" with Dominican bachata singer Andres Mercedes. On 10 March 2023, he collaborates with the Dominican bachata group Grupo Extra in the remix of their song "Beberé".

In 2023, he released compilation albums of remakes of his songs to celebrate the history of his career. These albums are part of the series titled Mi Historia Musical (My Musical History). He released Vol. 1 on 23 June 2023. On 2 August 2023, he released the music video for the 2023 remake of the song "Me Haces Mucha Falta Amor", which served as a single for Vol. 1. The original version of the song is from his debut album, Tú Serás Mi Reina (1991). He then released Vol. 2 on 25 August 2023. On 6 October 2023, he and Henry Santos released the single "No Soy Nada Sin Ti" as part of Santos' upcoming sixth studio album, 2.0 (2024). On 8 December 2023, he released Mi Historia Musical, Vol. 3. He then released Vol. 4 on 23 February 2024.

On 14 February 2025, Reyes released his twentieth studio album, Descarada. It includes the singles, "Papá", released on 30 May 2024, and "Mejor Que a Ti Me Va", released on 15 November 2024.

== Discography ==
=== Studio ===
- 1991: Tú Serás Mi Reina
- 1993: Si El Amor Condena, Estoy Condenado
- 1994: Bachata con Categoría
- 1995: Regresó Mi Amor Bonito
- 1996: El Antojito
- 1996: El Príncipe
- 1998: Vine A Decirte Adiós
- 1999: Extraño Mi Pueblo
- 2000: Amor En Silencio
- 2002: Déjame Entrar En Ti
- 2004: Cuando Se Quiere Se Puede
- 2005: Dosis De Amor
- 2006: Pienso En Ti
- 2007: Te Regalo El Mar
- 2009: Sigue Tu Vida
- 2012: Soy Tuyo
- 2014: Noche de Pasión
- 2016: Devuélveme Mi Libertad
- 2021: Aventurero
- 2025: Descarada

=== Live ===
- 2002: Bachata De Gala
- 2004: En Vivo
- 2005: From Santo Domingo Live!
- 2007: Tour 2007

=== Compilation ===
- 1997: Estelares De Frank Reyes
- 1998: El Príncipe de la Bachata: 16 Éxitos
- 2000: Éxitos
- 2009: Lo Mejor De Lo Mejor
- 2010: Éxitos Eternos
- 2011: Mega Mix Hits
- 2015: 1
- 2019: Quien Eres Tú
- 2019: Solo Merengue, Vol. 17
- 2023: Mi Historia Musical, Vol. 1
- 2023: Mi Historia Musical, Vol. 2
- 2023: Mi Historia Musical, Vol. 3
- 2024: Mi Historia Musical, Vol. 4
