= Romeo Santos discography =

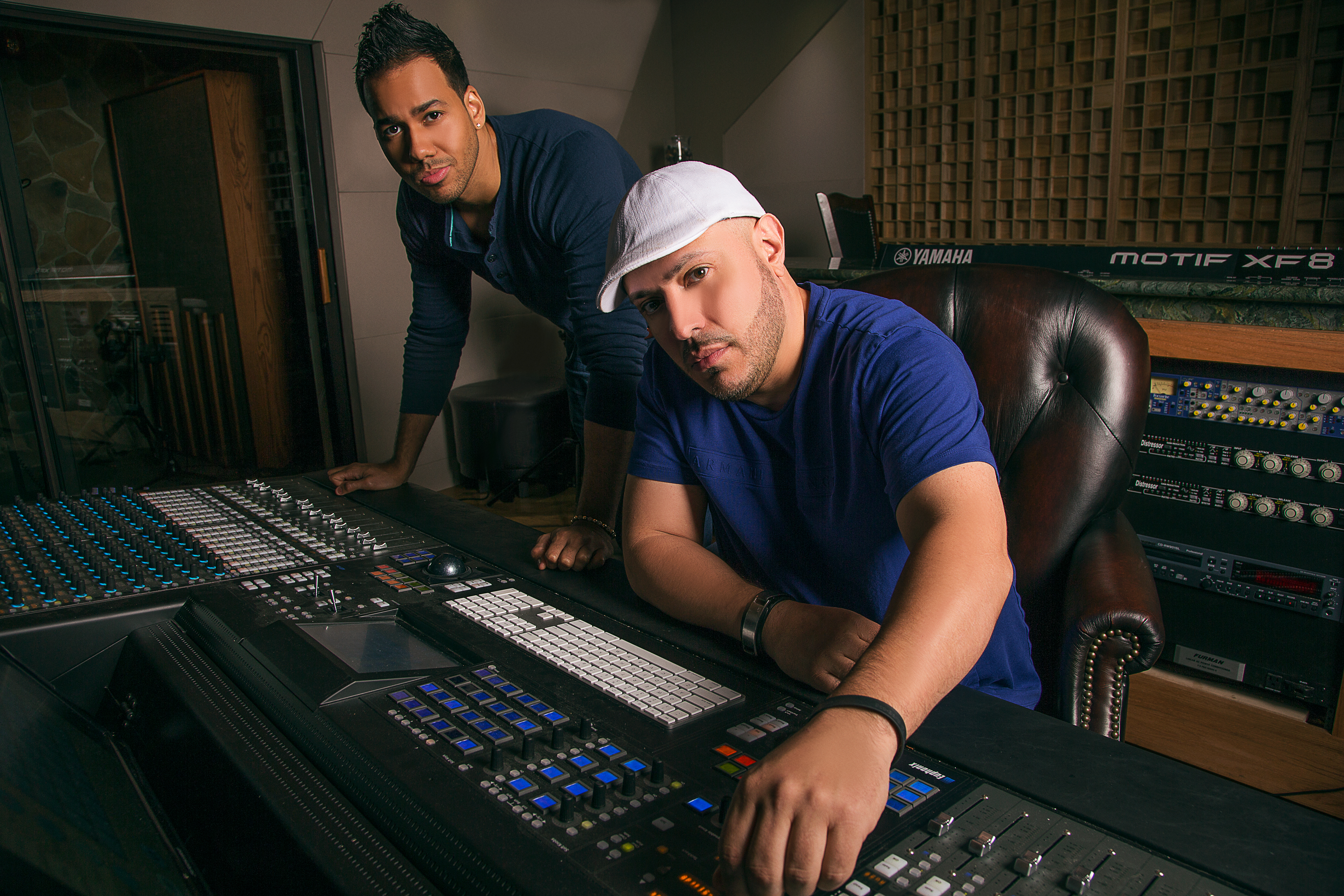
- Romeo Santos with Mate Traxx at Castle Studios in 2022
- Studio albums: 6
- Live albums: 2
- Singles: 51
- Music videos: 25

American singer Romeo Santos has released six studio albums and two live albums since the start of his solo career.

== Albums ==
=== Studio albums ===
List of studio albums, with selected chart positions, sales figures, and certifications
Title	Album details	Peak chart positions									Sales	Certifications
Title	Album details	US	US Latin	US Trop.	FRA	ITA	SPA	SWI	MEX	NLD	Sales	Certifications
Formula, Vol. 1	Released: November 8, 2011; Label: Sony Latin; Format: CD, digital download	9	1	1	—	—	77	—	26	—	US: 328,000	RIAA: 24× Platinum (Latin); AMPROFON: 4× Platinum; APFV: Gold
Formula, Vol. 2	Released: February 25, 2014; Label: Sony Latin; Format: CD, digital download	5	1	1	—	40	4	46	1	61	US: 245,000; World: 1,000,000	RIAA: 43× Platinum (Latin); AMPROFON: Diamond+4× Platinum+Gold; FIMI: Gold; PROMUSICAE: Gold
Golden	Released: July 21, 2017; Label: Sony Latin; Format: CD, digital download	10	1	1	197	68	3	37	1	74	US: 240,000	RIAA: 22× Platinum (Latin); AMPROFON: 3× Platinum; FIMI: Gold
Utopía	Released: April 5, 2019; Label: Sony Latin; Format: CD, digital download	18	1	1	—	53	10	25	30	67		RIAA: 12× Platinum (Latin); AMPROFON: Gold
Formula, Vol. 3	Released: September 1, 2022; Label: Sony Latin; Format: CD, digital download	10	2	1	—	75	6	12	—	—		RIAA: Diamond (Latin); AMPROFON: Gold; PROMUSICAE: Gold

=== Collaborative studio albums ===
List of collaborative studio albums
Title	Album details	Peak chart positions					Certifications
Title	Album details	US	US Latin	US Trop.	SPA	SWI	Certifications
Better Late Than Never (with Prince Royce (with Prince Royce)	Released: November 28, 2025; Label: Sony Latin; Format: CD, LP, digital download	32	2	1	6	13	RIAA: 2× Platinum (Latin); PROMUSICAE: Gold

=== Live albums ===
List of studio albums, with selected chart positions
Title	Album details	Peak chart positions			Certifications
Title	Album details	US	US Latin	US Trop.	Certifications
The King Stays King: Sold Out at Madison Square Garden	Released: November 6, 2012; Label: Sony Latin; Format: CD, digital download	65	1	1	CAPIF: Gold; AMPROFON: Gold
Utopía Live from MetLife Stadium	Released: September 10, 2021; Label: Sony Latin; Format: CD, digital download	—	—	—	
"—" denotes a title that was not released or did not chart in that territory

== Singles ==
=== As lead artist ===
List of singles, with selected chart positions, showing year released and album name
Title	Year	Peak chart positions									Certifications	Album
Title	Year	US	US Latin	US Trop.	DR Gen.	PR Gen.	COL	MEX	SPA	VEN	Certifications	Album
"You"	2011	97	1	1	—	—	—	—	—	—	RIAA: 5× Platinum (Latin); AMPROFON: Platinum+Gold	Fórmula, Vol. 1
"Promise" (featuring Usher)	2011	83	1	1	—	—	—	14	—	—	RIAA: 34× Platinum (Latin); AMPROFON: 2× Platinum+Gold	Fórmula, Vol. 1
"Mi Santa" (featuring Tomatito)	2012	—	1	1	—	—	—	—	—	—	RIAA: 4× Platinum (Latin); AMPROFON: 3× Platinum+Gold	Fórmula, Vol. 1
"All Aboard" (featuring Lil Wayne)	2012	—	—	—	—	—	—	—	—	—		Fórmula, Vol. 1
"Rival" (featuring Mario Domm)	2012	—	42	—	—	—	—	9	—	—	AMPROFON: 2× Platinum	Fórmula, Vol. 1
"La Diabla"	2012	—	1	1	—	—	—	—	—	—	RIAA: 3× Platinum (Latin); AMPROFON: Diamond	Fórmula, Vol. 1
"Llévame Contigo"	2012	—	2	1	—	—	—	—	—	—	RIAA: 13× Platinum (Latin); AMPROFON: Diamond; PROMUSICAE: Platinum	The King Stays King: Sold Out at Madison Square Garden
"Propuesta Indecente"	2013	79	1	1	—	—	2	1	13	1	RIAA: 79× Platinum (Latin); AMPROFON: 3× Diamond+2× Platinum; FIMI: Platinum; PROMUSICAE: 6× Platinum	Fórmula, Vol. 2
"Odio" (featuring Drake)	2014	45	1	1	1	—	—	25	24	—	RIAA: 34× Platinum (Latin); AMPROFON: Diamond+2× Platinum	Fórmula, Vol. 2
"Cancioncitas de Amor"	2014	—	9	—	1	—	3	6	27	—	RIAA: 16× Platinum (Latin); AMPROFON: Diamond+Platinum; PROMUSICAE: Platinum	Fórmula, Vol. 2
"Eres Mía"	2014	— (Note: "Eres Mía" did not enter the Billboard Hot 100, but peaked at number 12 on the Bubbling Under Hot 100 Singles chart.)	2	1	1	—	4	7	84	8	RIAA: 39× Platinum (Latin); AMPROFON: 2× Diamond+3× Platinum+Gold; FIMI: Gold; PROMUSICAE: 3× Platinum	Fórmula, Vol. 2
"Yo También" (featuring Marc Anthony)	2014	—	4	2	—	—	—	—	—	—	RIAA: 19× Platinum (Latin); AMPROFON: Diamond; PROMUSICAE: Platinum	Fórmula, Vol. 2
"Héroe Favorito"	2017	77	2	1	4	—	—	—	8	—	RIAA: 5× Platinum (Latin); AMPROFON: 2× Platinum; PROMUSICAE: Gold	Golden
"Imitadora"	2017	91	5	1	2	—	—	—	99	—	RIAA: 7× Platinum (Latin); AMPROFON: Diamond+4× Platinum+Gold; FIMI: Gold; PROMUSICAE: 2× Platinum	Golden
"Bella y Sensual" (with Daddy Yankee and Nicky Jam)	2017	95	6	1	—	—	—	—	30	—	RIAA: 6× Platinum (Latin); AMPROFON: Diamond+2× Platinum; FIMI: Gold; PROMUSICAE: 3× Platinum	Golden
"El Farsante (Remix)" (with Ozuna)	2018	49	2	—	2	—	—	—	—	—		Non-album single
"Sobredosis" (featuring Ozuna)	2018	—	13	1	5	—	—	—	—	—	AMPROFON: Diamond+Platinum+Gold; FIMI: Gold; PROMUSICAE: 2× Platinum	Golden
"Carmín" (featuring Juan Luis Guerra)	2018	—	—	—	—	—	—	—	—	—		Golden
"Centavito"	2018	—	20	1	—	—	—	—	—	—		Golden
"Ella Quiere Beber (Remix)" (with Anuel AA)	2018	61	4	—	—	8	—	—	9	—	RIAA: Platinum (Latin); FIMI: Gold	Non-album single
"Aullando" (with Wisin & Yandel)	2019	—	10	1	4	1	5	7	24	5	RIAA: 22× Platinum (Latin); AMPROFON: Diamond+Platinum+Gold; FIMI: Gold; PROMUSICAE: 2× Platinum	Los Campeones del Pueblo: The Big Leagues
"Inmortal" (with Aventura)	2019	95	5	1	7	1	71	—	53	2	RIAA: Diamond (Latin); AMPROFON: Platinum; PROMUSICAE: Platinum	Utopía
"La Demanda" (with Raulín Rodríguez)	2019	—	37	9	1	—	—	—	—	—		Utopía
"Payasos" (with Frank Reyes)	2019	—	32	17	— (Note: "Payasos" did not enter the Monitor Latino Dominican Republic General Chart, but peaked at number 3 on the Dominican Republic Bachata chart.)	—	—	—	—	—		Utopía
"Canalla" (with El Chaval de la Bachata)	2019	—	26	2	7	—	—	—	—	—		Utopía
"Millonario" (with Elvis Martínez)	2019	—	—	—	2	—	—	—	—	—		Utopía
"Me Quedo" (with Zacarías Ferreíra)	2019	—	34	8	3	—	—	—	—	—		Utopía
"Ileso" (with Teodoro Reyes)	2019	—	—	13	— (Note: "Ileso" did not enter the Monitor Latino Dominican Republic General Chart, but peaked at number 3 on the Dominican Republic Bachata chart.)	—	—	—	—	—		Utopía
"Amor Enterrado (with Joe Veras)	2019	—	45	—	— (Note: "Amor Enterrado" did not enter the Monitor Latino Dominican Republic General Chart, but peaked at number 10 on the Dominican Republic Bachata chart.)	—	—	—	—	—		Utopía
"El Beso Que No Le Di" (with Kiko Rodríguez)	2019	—	34	7	18	—	—	—	—	—	AMPROFON: Gold	Utopía
"Años Luz" (with Monchy & Alexandra)	2019	—	—	—	—	—	—	—	—	—		Utopía
"Los Últimos" (with Luis Vargas)	2019	—	—	—	— (Note: "Los Últimos" did not enter the Monitor Latino Dominican Republic General Chart, but peaked at number 9 on the Dominican Republic Bachata chart.)	—	—	—	—	—		Utopía
"La Mejor Versión de Mí (Remix)" (with Natti Natasha)	2019	— (Note: "El Pañuelo" did not enter the Billboard Hot 100, but peaked at number 19 on the Bubbling Under Hot 100 Singles chart.)	10	1	3	1	—	1	—	—	RIAA: 6× Platinum (Latin); PROMUSICAE: Platinum	Non-album single
"Sigues Con Él" (remix) (with Arcángel and Sech)	2020	—	—	—	—	—	—	—	35	—	RIAA: 3× Platinum (Latin)	Los Favoritos 2
"Nuestro Amor" (with Alex Bueno)	2020	—	—	3	— (Note: "Nuestro Amor" did not enter the Monitor Latino Dominican Republic General Chart, but peaked at number 2 on the Dominican Republic Bachata chart.)	—	—	—	—	—		Queda Algo
"Tú Vas A Tener Que Explicarme (Remix)" (with La Ross Maria)	2020	—	—	—	—	—	—	—	—	—		Non-album singles
"Fan de Tus Fotos" (with Nicky Jam)	2021	—	—	—	—	—	—	—	—	—	AMPROFON: Gold; PROMUSICAE: Platinum	Infinity
"Sus Huellas"	2022	— (Note: "Sus Huellas" did not enter the Billboard Hot 100, but peaked at number five on the Bubbling Under Hot 100 Singles chart.)	10	1	5	1	1	5	100	—	RIAA: 6× Platinum (Latin); AMPROFON: Gold; PROMUSICAE: Gold	Fórmula, Vol. 3
"Sin Fin" (with Justin Timberlake)	2022	100	15	1	—	1	1	—	—	—	RIAA: 3× Platinum (Latin); PROMUSICAE: Gold	Fórmula, Vol. 3
"El Pañuelo" (with Rosalía)	2022	— (Note: "El Pañuelo" did not enter the Billboard Hot 100, but peaked at number 23 on the Bubbling Under Hot 100 Singles chart.)	20	1	—	2	—	1	7	—	RIAA: 3× Platinum (Latin); AMPROFON: Gold; PROMUSICAE: 2× Platinum	Fórmula, Vol. 3
"Bebo"	2022	—	41	16	—	—	1	—	—	—	RIAA: 4× Platinum (Latin)	Fórmula, Vol. 3
"Me Extraño" (with Christian Nodal)	2022	—	46	—	—	—	—	—	—	—	RIAA: 3× Platinum (Latin); AMPROFON: Platinum+Gold	Fórmula, Vol. 3
"SIRI" (with Chris Lebron)	2022	—	—	18	4	—	—	—	—	—	RIAA: 3× Platinum (Latin)	Fórmula, Vol. 3
"Solo Conmigo"	2023	—	40	3	— (Note: "Solo Conmigo" did not enter the Monitor Latino Dominican Republic General Chart, but peaked at number 7 on the Dominican Republic Bachata chart.)	—	—	—	—	—	RIAA: 4× Platinum (Latin)	Fórmula, Vol. 3
"X Si Volvemos" (with Karol G)	2023	48	5	—	3	—	7	—	9	—	RIAA: Gold (Latin); PROMUSICAE: 3× Platinum	Mañana Será Bonito
"Suegra"	2023	—	—	17	— (Note: "Suegra" did not enter the Monitor Latino Dominican Republic General Chart, but peaked at number 4 on the Dominican Republic Bachata chart.)	—	—	—	—	—	RIAA: Platinum (Latin)	Fórmula, Vol. 3
"Boomerang"	2023	—	—	16	—	—	—	—	—	—	RIAA: Platinum (Latin)	Fórmula, Vol. 3
"Ángel" (with Grupo Frontera)	2024	—	—	—	—	—	—	—	—	—		Non-album single
"Khé?" (with Rauw Alejandro)	2024	—	—	—	—	—	—	—	—	—	AMPROFON: Diamond; PROMUSICAE: Platinum	Cosa Nuestra
"Estocolmo" (with Prince Royce)	2025	—	13	24	—	—	—	—	—	—	RIAA: Platinum (Latin)	Better Late Than Never
"Lokita Por Mí" (with Prince Royce)	2026	—	11	1	1	1	—	—	22	—	RIAA: Platinum (Latin)	Better Late Than Never
"Dardos" (with Prince Royce)	2026	— (Note: "Dardos" did not enter the Billboard Hot 100, but peaked at number 14 on the Bubbling Under Hot 100 chart.)	8	1	2	1	—	—	1	—	RIAA: 6× Platinum (Latin); PROMUSICAE: 3× Platinum	Better Late Than Never
"Ay! San Miguel" (with Prince Royce)	2026	—	20	1	—	—	—	—	—	—	RIAA: 2× Platinum (Latin)	Better Late Than Never
"Menor" (with Prince Royce and Dalvin La Melodía)	2026	—	—	— (Note: "Menor" did not enter the Billboard Tropical Airplay chart, but peaked at number 13 on the Hot Tropical Songs chart.)	— (Note: "Menor" did not enter the Monitor Latino Dominican Republic General Chart, but peaked at number 14 on the Dominican Republic Bachata chart.)	—	—	—	—	—		Better Late Than Never
"—" denotes a title that was not released or did not chart in that territory

=== Promo singles and other charted songs ===
Year	Song	Peak chart positions			Certifications	Album
Year	Song	US Latin	US Tropical	Dom. Rep.	Certifications	Album
2011	"Que Se Mueran"	29	26	—	AMPROFON: Platinum	Formula, Vol. 1
2012	"Soberbio"	44	—	—	AMPROFON: Platinum	Formula, Vol. 1
2012	"Debate de 4" (featuring Antony "El Mayimbe" Santos, Luis Vargas and Raulin Rodriguez)	23	26	—	AMPROFON: Gold	Formula, Vol. 1
2014	"Animales" (featuring Nicki Minaj)	45	—	—		Formula, Vol. 2
2014	"Inocente"	23	—	—		Formula, Vol. 2
2014	"7 Dias"	32	—	—		Formula, Vol. 2
2014	"Amigo"	30	—	—		Formula, Vol. 2
2014	"No Tiene La Culpa"	49	—	—		Formula, Vol. 2
2014	"Necio" (featuring Carlos Santana)	31	—	—	RIAA: 3× Platinum (Latin)	Formula, Vol. 2
2015	"Hilito"	4	2	—	RIAA: 4× Platinum (Latin)	Formula, Vol. 2
2017	"Tuyo"	36	18	—		Golden
2017	"Perjurio"	47	21	—		Golden
2018	"El Papel, Part 1" (Version Amante)	—	—	— (Note: "El Papel, Part 1 (Version Amante)" did not enter the Monitor Latino Dominican Republic General Chart, but peaked at number 9 on the Dominican Republic Bachata chart.)		Golden
2018	"El Papel, Part 2" (Version Marido)	—	—	— (Note: "El Papel, Part 2 (Version Marido)" did not enter the Monitor Latino Dominican Republic General Chart, but peaked at number 3 on the Dominican Republic Bachata chart.)		Golden
2022	"Culpable" (with Lápiz Conciente)	—	—	5	RIAA: Gold (Latin)	Formula, Vol. 3
2022	"15,500 Noches" (with Fernando Villalona, Rubby Pérez & Toño Rosario) (featuring Ramon Orlando)	—	13	— (Note: "15,500 Noches" did not enter the Monitor Latino Dominican Republic General Chart, but peaked at number 6 on the Dominican Republic Merengue chart.)	RIAA: Platinum (Latin)	Formula, Vol. 3
2022	"La Última Vez" (with Luis Miguel Del Amargue)	—	—	— (Note: "La Última Vez" did not enter the Monitor Latino Dominican Republic General Chart, but peaked at number 10 on the Dominican Republic Bachata chart.)	RIAA: Gold (Latin)	Formula, Vol. 3
2023	"Ayúdame"	—	7	—	RIAA: Platinum (Latin)	Formula, Vol. 3
2025	"Better Late Than Never" (with Prince Royce)	14	— (Note: "Better Late Than Never" did not enter the Billboard Tropical Airplay chart, but peaked at number 5 on the Hot Tropical Songs chart.)	—	RIAA: Gold (Latin)	Better Late Than Never
2025	"Jezabel" (with Prince Royce)	28	— (Note: "Jezabel" did not enter the Billboard Tropical Airplay chart, but peaked at number 7 on the Hot Tropical Songs chart.)	—	RIAA: Gold (Latin)	Better Late Than Never
2025	"La Amaré" (with Prince Royce)	—	— (Note: "La Amaré" did not enter the Billboard Tropical Airplay chart, but peaked at number 15 on the Hot Tropical Songs chart.)	—	RIAA: Gold (Latin)	Better Late Than Never
2025	"Celeste" (with Prince Royce)	36	— (Note: "Celeste" did not enter the Billboard Tropical Airplay chart, but peaked at number 11 on the Hot Tropical Songs chart.)	—		Better Late Than Never
2025	"Encerrados" (with Prince Royce)	41	— (Note: "Encerrados" did not enter the Billboard Tropical Airplay chart, but peaked at number 14 on the Hot Tropical Songs chart.)	—		Better Late Than Never
2025	"Blanca Nieves" (with Prince Royce)	—	— (Note: "Blanca Nieves" did not enter the Billboard Tropical Airplay chart, but peaked at number 16 on the Hot Tropical Songs chart.)	—		Better Late Than Never
2025	"Mi Plan" (with Prince Royce)	—	— (Note: "Mi Plan" did not enter the Billboard Tropical Airplay chart, but peaked at number 17 on the Hot Tropical Songs chart.)	—		Better Late Than Never
2025	"La Última Bachata" (with Prince Royce)	40	— (Note: "La Última Bachata" did not enter the Billboard Tropical Airplay chart, but peaked at number 13 on the Hot Tropical Songs chart.)	—	RIAA: Gold (Latin)	Better Late Than Never

- Every song from Utopía was a single. Meaning that none of its songs fit this table chart.

=== Featured singles and other featured songs ===
Year	Song	Peak chart positions							Album
Year	Song	US	US Latin	US Tropical	DR Gen.	PR Gen.	MEX	VEN	Album
2006	"No, No, No" (Thalía featuring Romeo Santos)	—	4	5	—	—	—	—	El Sexto Sentido Re+Loaded
2007	"Me Voy" (Remix) (Héctor Acosta "El Torito" featuring Romeo Santos)	—	47 (Note: The song doesn't show up on Aventura nor Romeo Santos' chart history. Also, Hector Acosta's chart history page is no longer available and it is archived, but it is missing information. However, it does appear on Anthony Santos' chart history. This might be because Anthony and Romeo have the same name which could explain the confusion as it shows Romeo being shown as Anthony "Romeo" Santos.)	15 (Note: The song doesn't show up on Aventura nor Romeo Santos' chart history. Also, Hector Acosta's chart history page is no longer available and it is archived, but it is missing information. However, it does appear on Anthony Santos' chart history. This might be because Anthony and Romeo have the same name which could explain the confusion as it shows Romeo being shown as Anthony "Romeo" Santos.)	—	—	—	—	Mitad / Mitad
2012	"Rags To Riches (Spanglish Version)" (Tony Bennett featuring Romeo Santos)	—	—	—	—	—	—	—	Viva Duets
2013	"Reza Por Mi" (Draco Rosa featuring Romeo Santos)	—	—	—	—	—	—	—	Vida
2013	"Frío Frío (Live)" (Juan Luis Guerra featuring Romeo Santos)	—	16	17	—	—	—	—	Asondeguerra Tour
2013	"Loco" (Enrique Iglesias featuring Romeo Santos)	80	1	2	1	—	1	70	Sex and Love
2014	"Margarita" (Santana featuring Romeo Santos)	—	—	—	—	—	—	—	Corazón
2015	"Masoquismo" (Anthony Santos featuring Romeo Santos)	—	—	—	—	—	—	—	Non-album single
2018	"Bellas" (Anthony Santos featuring Romeo Santos)	—	—	—	— (Note: "Bellas" did not enter the Monitor Latino Dominican Republic General Chart, but peaked at number 18 on the Dominican Republic Bachata chart.)	—	—	—	La Historia De Mi Vida: El Final, Vol. 1 and Utopía
2020	"Como Yo (Remix)" (Luis Segura featuring Romeo Santos)	—	—	—	—	—	—	—	El Papá De La Bachata, Su Legado - Añoñado IV
