= Utopía Live from MetLife Stadium =

Live album by Romeo Santos
- Released: September 10, 2021
- Recorded: September 21, 2019
- Venues: MetLife Stadium, East Rutherford, New Jersey
- Genres: Bachata; R&B
- Length: 64:00
- Language: Spanish
- Label: Sony Latin

Romeo Santos chronology
Utopía (2019)	Utopía Live from MetLife Stadium (2021)	Formula, Vol. 3 (2022)

Singles from Utopía Live from MetLife Stadium
- 1. "Inmortal (live from MetLife Stadium)" Released: August 20, 2021

Utopía Live from MetLife Stadium is the second live album and second concert film by American singer Romeo Santos as a solo artist. It is based on the sold-out concert that took place on September 21, 2019, at MetLife Stadium. The film version was premiered on June 25, 2021, on Pay-Per-View along with a documentary titled Romeo Santos: King of Bachata. Both films were later released on July 30, 2021, on HBO Max. The live album was later released on September 10, 2021, 11 days before the 2 year anniversary of the concert. The video of Aventura performing the song "Inmortal" at MetLife was released on August 19, 2021. The live audio only version was released the next day as the main single for the live album.

== Track listing ==
All tracks are written by Anthony "Romeo" Santos, except where noted.

Audio
No.	Title	Writer(s)	Length
1.	"Dominicano Soy" (Intro)		0:34
2.	"Ileso"		3:37
3.	"La Diabla"		2:28
4.	"Amigo"		2:22
5.	"Eres Mía"		2:48
6.	"Imitadora"		3:54
7.	"Amor Enterrado" (featuring Joe Veras)		3:53
8.	"Millonario" (featuring Elvis Martínez)		3:52
9.	"Perjurio"		3:04
10.	"Llévame Contigo"		2:50
11.	"Años Luz" (featuring Monchy & Alexandra)		3:36
12.	"Propuesta Indecente"		3:10
13.	"Payasos" (featuring Frank Reyes)		3:26
14.	"Canalla" (featuring El Chaval De La Bachata)		3:44
15.	"Odio"		2:09
16.	"Los Últimos" (featuring Luis Vargas)		5:07
17.	"Promise"		3:06
18.	"El Beso Que No Le Di" (featuring Kiko Rodriguez)		3:25
19.	"Por Mi Timidez"	Anthony Santos	2:31
20.	"Inmortal" (Aventura)		5:10
Total length:			1:04:00

- The physical version is a 2-CD album. Track #1-10 on disc one, and track #11-20 on disc two.

Film
No.	Title	Writer(s)	Length
1.	"Dominicano Soy" (Intro)
2.	"Ileso"
3.	"La Diabla"
4.	"Amigo"
5.	"Eres Mía"
6.	"Me Quedo" (featuring Zacarías Ferreira)
7.	"Imitadora"
8.	"Amor Enterrado" (featuring Joe Veras)
9.	"Millonario" (featuring Elvis Martínez)
10.	"Perjurio"
11.	"Llévame Contigo"
12.	"Años Luz" (featuring Monchy & Alexandra)
13.	"Propuesta Indecente"
14.	"Payasos" (featuring Frank Reyes)
15.	"Canalla" (featuring El Chaval De La Bachata)
16.	"Odio"
17.	"La Demanda" (featuring Raulín Rodríguez)
18.	"Los Últimos" (featuring Luis Vargas)
19.	"Promise"
20.	"El Beso Que No Le Di" (featuring Kiko Rodriguez)
21.	"Por Mi Timidez"	Anthony Santos
22.	"Obsesión" (Aventura featuring Cardi B)
23.	"Inmortal" (Aventura)

- A lot of songs were performed at the concert with multiple artist. Only these artist made it to the album and film. Only 23 songs were shown in the film in which 20 of them made it to the audio only version.
