= Romeo Santos: King of Bachata =

- Film poster
- Directed by: Devin Amar; Charles Todd
- Produced by: Ned Doyle; Sheira Rees-Davies; James Rothman
- Starring: Romeo Santos
- Cinematography: Rick Siegel
- Edited by: Matt Mitchener
- Production companies: Sony Music Latin; Scheme Engine; Chimby Productions
- Distributed by: HBO
- Release dates: June 25, 2021 (Pay-Per-View); July 30, 2021 (HBO Max)
- Running time: 92 minutes
- Country: United States
- Languages: English; Spanish

Romeo Santos: King of Bachata is a 2021 documentary film directed by Devin Amar and Charles Todd. It's about the history of bachata and bachata star Romeo Santos's journey to MetLife Stadium. It first premiered on Pay-Per-View on June 25, 2021, along with Utopía Live from MetLife Stadium concert film. On July 30, 2021, both films premiered on HBO Max. This film featured main stream celebrities and legendary bachata artists. It also featured The Kid Mero as the narrator for this documentary as he traveled to the restaurants and bars of the countryside of the Dominican Republic, where the sound originated and retraces its rise to international recognition. It tells the history of the genre and its struggles during its early days. It shows the history of Romeo Santos, including his time with Aventura. It also includes behind the scenes footage of his historic sold out show from 2019 at MetLife Stadium and highlights from the concert itself.

== Promotion ==
To promote the documentary, HBO built an elaborate pop-up promotion in Washington Heights, NYC in the form of a bodega, called House of Bachata, with free haircuts, Presidente beer, and karaoke parties honoring Santos. It was hosted by HBO Max Pa’lante in partnership with the CUNY Dominican Studies Institute. At its center was a PORTL "hologram" device in which Santos appeared in lifelike, lifesized, volumetric 4K to interact with fans.

== Cast ==
- Anthony "Romeo" Santos
- Henry Santos Jeter - cousin, Aventura member
- Lenny Santos - friend, Aventura member
- Max Santos - friend, Aventura member
- Joel Armogasto Martinez (The Kid Mero) - narrator
- Joaquín Díaz - music director, composer
- José Manuel Calderón - bachata artist
- Zacarías Ferreira - bachata artist
- Joe Veras - bachata artist
- Monchy - bachata artist
- Alexandra - bachata artist
- Frank Reyes - bachata artist
- El Chaval De La Bachata - bachata artist
- Raulín Rodríguez - bachata artist
- Luis Vargas - bachata artist
- Kiko Rodriguez - bachata artist
- Anthony Santos - bachata artist
- Marc Anthony - artist
- Sergio George - producer, arranger
- Artie Pabon - business partner
- Tommy Mottola - music executive
- Raphy Pina - founder of Pina Records
- Cardi B - artist
- Daddy Yankee - artist
- Thalía - artist
- Ivan "Mate Traxx" Chevere - engineer
- Afo Verde - chairman & ceo of Sony Music Latin Iberia

== Release ==
Romeo Santos: King Of Bachata first premiered on June 25, 2021, making this one of Romeo Santos' first two Pay-Per-View appearances. It was later released for streaming on July 30, 2021 on HBO Max.
