= El Chaval de la Bachata =

Dominican musician and producer (born 1978)

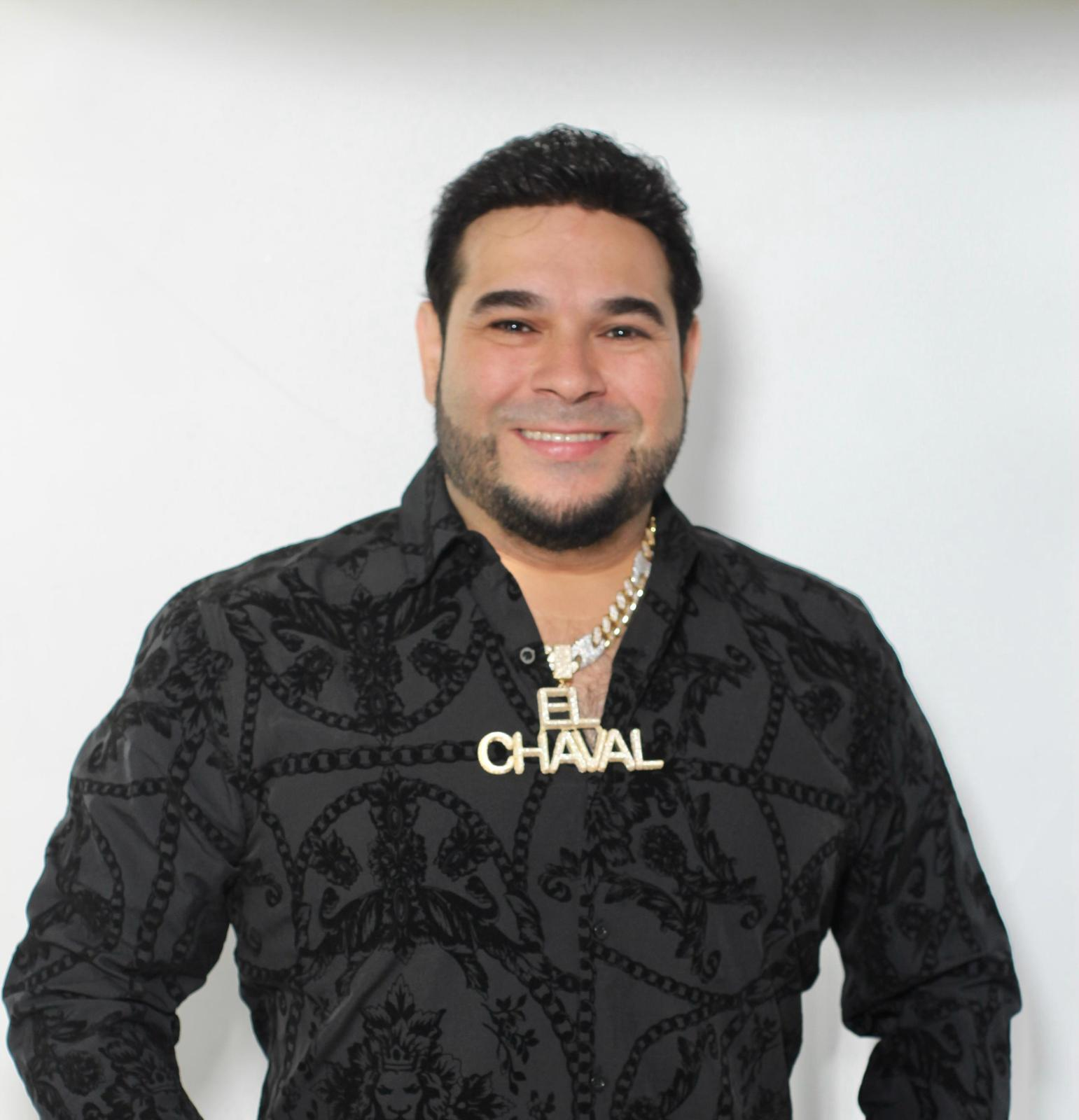
- El Chaval de la Bachata, 2023

Background information
- Born: Linar de Jesús Espinal Nuñez; December 4, 1978 (age 47); Jánico, Dominican Republic
- Genre: Bachata
- Occupations: Musician, songwriter
- Instrument: Vocals
- Years active: 1994–present
- Labels: Nepo Nuñez Records, Sanchez Family Entertainment, Fancy Records, 829Music Mundial

Linar Espinal (Juncalito, Jánico, December 4, 1978), better known as El Chaval de la Bachata, is a Dominican musician, singer, composer and producer.

He began his career in 1994 with the help of businessman Nepo Núñez with the musical group Los Infantiles del Amargue, launching as a solo artist under the Nepo Nuñez Records label with his first production titled Sentimiento Único (1997), which included the hit "Cuando el Amor se va".

He is a composer and performer of important songs in the bachata genre like "Donde Están Esos Amigos", "Estoy Perdido", "No Soy tu Marido" and "Canalla" with Romeo Santos, among others. During his career has obtained awards and nominations at events like the Soberano Awards and the Billboard Latin Music Awards, and he has recorded with artists like Romeo Santos, Luis Vargas, Gerardo Morán, Luis Gonzaga Segura, Leonardo Paniagua and Luis Miguel del Amargue, among others.

== Early life ==
Linar Espinal was born on December 4, 1978 in the Juncalito district, in the municipality of Jánico, Dominican Republic. Son of Jesús Espinal and María Nuñez, he is the youngest among four siblings. Inspired by his father, one of the first instruments he decided to play was the accordion, which he changed for the guitar when he was barely seven years old. At that time, the young musician had emigrated to the city of Santiago, where he was influenced by the bachatas of Blas Durán.

== Career ==
=== First decade: Nepo Nuñez Records (1993–2003) ===
When he was thirteen years old he met Juan Tavárez in 1993, who had a bachata group accompanied by his eight-year-old son Joel Tavarez, with whom they formed the group Los Infantiles del Amargue, in which he participated as vocalist and second guitar.

In 1997, after three years of career with the group (which would end up being called Los Jóvenes del Amargue), Espinal decided to change his stage name to El Chaval de la Bachata, launching that same year his first production Sentimiento Único. The album was well received by the public, thanks to songs like "Cuando El Amor Se Va", which became an importante song in the bachata genre. A year later, he won its first gold record by selling more than 200,000 copies of Sentimiento Único.

After his debut, he published musical albums almost uninterruptedly: Enfermo de amor (1998), Para toda la vida (for which he received a nomination for the Globo and Aces Awards in 1999), Para siempre (2001), Volveré (2002) and Ayer y Hoy (2003). All these releases were made under the Nepo Nuñez Records label.

=== Casandra Awards and "Donde Están Esos Amigos" (2004–2009) ===
In 2004 he released the album Devuélveme todo under the Ramada Music label, which includes a tribute to Luis Segura, "Devuélveme todo" and "Estoy Perdido". This last song was a national and international success, and earned a nomination for Bachata of the year in the 2006 edition of the Casandra awards.

In 2007 he recorded the production Ya me cansé, which included "Donde Están Esos Amigos", among others. The album marked the artist's first entry on Billboard charts, debuting in tenth position on the Tropical Albums list. In 2009 he was nominated in three categories of the Casandra Awards: Bachatero of the year, Composer of the year and Bachata of the year. year, winning this last category with the song, "Donde Están Esos Amigos", which was also nominated for the Billboard Latin Music Awards of the same year as Tropical Airplay Song. Also in 2009 he released the album Lo que me Pidas. This production was nominated again for the 2010 Casandra Awards in the categories Bachata of the year and Bachatero of the year.

=== Following years (2010–2021) ===
In 2012 he released the album Por el maldito dinero, and in 2014 he recorded the song "Tres Semanas", written by Marco Antonio Solís. The same year he signed a contract with the company 829Music Mundial, under the direction of Vladmir García; currently he continues to be linked to that record company. In 2016 he released the album Sincrodestino with the single "No Soy Tu Marido". The song was nominated for Bachata of the year at the 2017 Soberano Awards.

After his collaboration with Romeo Santos on the song "Canalla" from the album Utopía, El Chaval published a new musical production titled Mil Historias, where he invited various emerging talents from the Dominican Republic. "Me sacaste del llavero" was the audiovisual material released as a single. Also, the single "Bipolar" was positioned on Monitor Latino as the most requested song in the Dominican Republic.

In 2019 he performed with Romeo Santos at MetLife Stadium in New York City in front of an audience of more than 80,000, as part of the American artist's Utopia album tour.

=== 25 years of experience and current events (2022–2024) ===
With a concert at the United Palace theater in New York City, El Chaval announced the celebration of his twenty-five years in music in October 2022. He was accompanied by Raulín Rodríguez, Frank Reyes, Don Miguelo, among others, in this concert that would be a "sold out" three weeks from the presentation date. He obtained new nominations for the Soberano Awards in the categories of Bachatero of the year and Bachata of the year for «Dile a él».

In celebration of his twenty-six years as an artist, he published the album Alayah #15 in 2023, with more than twenty songs, among them "La Plata", in which he pays tribute in vallenato rhythm to the Colombian singer Diomedes Díaz. The album also included the song "Contrato de amantes", written by Romeo Santos. That same year he was recognized by the consulate of the Dominican Republic in Spain for his extensive career.

In 2024 he was nominated again as Bachatero of the year at the Soberano Awards, and received a shared nomination with musician Luis Miguel del Amargue in the Bachata of the year category for the song "Mujer sin alma".

== Discography ==
- Sentimiento Único (1997)
- Enfermo de amor (1998)
- Para toda la vida (1999)
- Para siempre (2001)
- Volveré (2002)
- Ayer y hoy (2003)
- Devuélveme todo (2004)
- No te llamo más (2005)
- Ya me cansé (2007)
- Lo que me pidas (2009)
- Por el maldito dinero (2012)
- Sincrodestino (2016)
- Mil historias (2019)
- Añoranzas a mis amigos (2022)
- Alayah #15 (2023)
