= Luis Segura =

Dominican singer (born 1939)

- Also known as: El Papá De La Bachata; El Añoñaito
- Born: 21 June 1939 (age 87); Mao, Valverde Province, Dominican Republic
- Genre: Bachata
- Occupations: Musician; Singer; Composer
- Instruments: Vocals; guitar
- Years active: 1964–present
- Labels: J&N Records
- Website: luisseguraoficial.com (in Spanish)

Luis Segura (born 21 June 1939), is a popular traditional Dominican singer often referred to as 'The Father of Bachata'. He is considered one of the best interpreters of traditional bachata with hits like "Pena por ti", "Dicen", and "No me celes tanto". Segura's first recordings were in the 1960s but it wasn't until his release of "Pena por ti" in the early 1980s that Segura hit stardom. Its immense popularity led to growing acceptance, making it the first Bachata song to be featured on FM radio. This broke the tradition of the genre being confined to AM broadcasts, which was predominantly diverted to rural areas, and elevated the genre's status by reaching urban and mainstream audiences.

== Discography ==
=== Studio albums ===
- Perdido (1965)
1. Perdido
2. Ya No Me Importa Nada
3. No Soy Feliz
4. Eres Tú Cuando Caminas
5. Quién Podrá
6. Por Eso Debes Sufrir
7. Dónde Está Ella
8. Yo No Sé Lo Que Me Pasa
9. Dios Mío No Nos Desampares
10. Si Será Como Un Castigo
11. No Voy A Llorar
12. Tengo Que Olvidarte
- En Nueva York (1971)
1. No Me Tortures
2. Cariñito De Mi Vida
3. Yo No Culpo A Nadie
4. No Me Tortures
5. Siempre Te Recuerdo A Ti
6. Abre Mi Pecho
7. Donde Tú Estás
8. Cuando Estoy Cerca De Ti
9. Tú Eres Mi Vida
10. Tú No Me Quieres A Mi
11. Que Me Castigue Dios
- La Copa Rota (1973)
1. Esa Mujer
2. Tú Eres Mi Hembra
3. Mi Palomita
4. Olvida
5. Cuando Miro Su Retrato
6. La Copa Rota
7. Lucero De Medianoche
8. Vete
9. Como El Álamo Al Camino
10. Mentiras Tuyas
- Luis Segura y Su Conjunto (1979)
1. Escondida
2. Me Siento Convencido
3. Carmencita
4. Yo Me Creía
5. Tanto Que Sufro
6. Aunque Todas Me Desprecien
7. El Día Que Yo Nací
8. No Te Vayas
9. Qué Soledad
10. Cuando Se Quiere Mucho
11. Muchachita De Mi Vida
12. Me Duele Decirte
- Amorcito De Mi Alma (1982)
1. Dejame Tomar
2. Quiero Ser Libre
3. Nada Vas A Lograr
4. Sin Ti
5. Amorcito De Mi Alma
6. Plegaria
7. Mi Corazon Te Llama
8. Mi Madre Sufre
9. Odio En La Sangre
10. Amar En La Pobreza
- Pena Por Ti (1982)
1. Pena Por Ti
2. Déjame Ya
3. Mi Muchachita
4. Siéntate En Mi Mesa
5. No Me Celes Tanto
6. Se Rompió La Cadena
7. Yo Encontré Lo que Buscaba
8. Dicen
9. Yo Quiero Hablarte
10. Amor Por Ti
- Me Dejaste Solo (1983)
1. Me Dejaste Solo
2. Corazón De Acero
3. Consejo De Un Amigo
4. El Gran Bohemio
5. Para Mí No Hay Navidad
6. Tu Nombre
7. Recuérdame
8. Piénsalo Bien
9. Súplica
10. Arrodíllate
- Me Dicen El Amargado (1984)
1. Me Dicen El Amargado
2. La Felicidad
3. Te Esperaré
4. El Prendedor
5. El Día Que Nací Yo
6. Cuando Estoy Contigo
7. Nadie Lo Debe Saber
8. No Mereces Que Te Mire
9. Si Me Dejas No Vale
10. Que Triste
- Tu Sabes / Mas Ñoño Que Nunca (1984)
1. Tú Sabes
2. Dime La Verdad
3. Llanto
4. Ven Que Me Muero
5. Por Esos Caminos
6. Me Estás Acabando
7. Ten Compasión De Mí
8. ¿Por Qué Dudas De Mí?
9. Mi Noche Triste
10. Esta Navidad
- En Grande (1985)
1. Pero Que Navidad
2. Por Qué Bailas Con Él
3. La Canción de Mis Recuerdos
4. Yo Te Necesito
5. Aunque Me Mate De Pena
6. Por Un Puñado De Plata
7. Adelante Merengue
8. No Quiero Que Te Vayas
9. La Situación
10. Quédate Con Tu Dinero
- Canciones De Amargue (1986)
1. Por Un Poco De Tu Amor
2. Te Da Mucho Calor
3. Perdóname Señor
4. Mami
5. Ya No Te Quiero
6. Hoy Me Toca Reír
7. Por Qué Razón
8. No Me Dejas Vivir
9. Si Vuelves A Salir
10. Celos Sin Razón
- No Te Separes De Mí (1987)
1. Penitencia
2. Que Agonía
3. Los Obreros
4. No Te Separes De Mí
5. No Me Hagas Sufrir Tanto
6. Tú Me Necesitas
7. Pasemos Este Momento
8. Me Tienes Loco
9. Lucero Que Alumbra El Día
10. No Me Molestes
- El Añoñaito! (1989)
1. Dime Que Me Quieres
2. Me Muero Por Ella
3. No Soy Malo
4. Que Murmuren
5. No Puedo Más
6. Ya lo Sé Que Te Vas
7. Ya Te Olvidé
8. Nuestro Juramento
9. Ahora Que Quieres
10. Presentimientos
- Qué Destino (1989)
1. La Cobardía
2. Qué Destino
3. Qué Tú Tienes
4. Solo
5. Ahora en Esta Barra
6. Yo No Sé
7. Ya Están Diciendo
8. Amada Mía
9. Qué Sé Yo
10. Cada Día
- Todo... Sentimiento (1992)
1. Déjame
2. Qué Será
3. Que No
4. Dónde Estará
5. Brindemos Por Ella
6. Te Vas
7. Amor
8. Tiempo Que Se Va No Vuelve
9. Quítame Esta Pena
10. Empecemos De Nuevo
- El Papá De La Bachata (1996)
1. Tú No Te Atreves
2. Ámame
3. Que Quieres Tú de Mi
4. Por Qué Huyes
5. Toda La Vida
6. Mamita
7. Dime
8. Una Más
9. El Primer Beso
10. Junto A Mí
- Hasta Cuándo (1997)
1. Ella Se Fue
2. Déjenme Llorar
3. Hasta Cuándo
4. Me Robaste el Alma
5. Por Tu Culpa
6. Nunca Eres Feliz
7. Qué Ganas con Llorar
8. La Fe Verdadera
9. Ay Corazón
10. Por Qué Te Sigo Amando
- Como Yo (1998)
1. Como Yo
2. Una Chica Como Tú
3. Traicionera
4. Si Supieras
5. Ay Morena
6. No Te Voy A Dejar
7. Para Qué Llorar
8. Casado y Loco
9. Serenata
10. Por Qué Sufrir
- La Razón De Mi Vida (1999)
1. Los Celos
2. No Puedo Dejarte de Amar
3. No Puedo Más
4. La Quiero
5. Qué Te He Hecho
6. Afincao
7. Ese Mequetrefe
8. Amor y Fantasía
9. No Me Digas Adiós
10. La Razón De Mi Vida
11. Desde Que Te Fuiste
12. Afincao (Mix)
- Cosas De La Vida (2000)
1. Me La Pagarás
2. Bájate De Esa Nube
3. Porque Moriré
4. Dos Mujeres
5. Cosas De La Vida
6. Cuando Estoy Contigo
7. Vuelve A Casa
8. No Puedo
9. Ay Mami
10. Decídete Ya
- Yo Te Perdono (2002)
1. Pena Penita
2. Dímelo
3. No Digas Nada (Bachata Version)
4. No Puedo Perdonarte
5. Por Ella
6. Te Perdono (Bachata Version)
7. Prefiero La Muerte
8. No Digas Nada (Bolero Version)
9. Te Perdono (Bolero Version)
10. No Mereces Que Te Mire
11. Perdóname
12. No Me Hablen Más De Ella
- Yo Volveré (2006)
1. Maldigo La Hora
2. Ya No Creo En Ti
3. Nuestro Amor Es Complicado
4. Qué Destino
5. Popurrí De Éxitos del Ayer
6. Si Tú Te Me Vas
7. Yo Volveré
8. Ay Qué Pena
9. Lo Averiguaré
10. Ejemplo De Amor
11. Madre
12. Amarte En Silencio
- El Abandonado (2016)
1. El Abandonado
2. Prefiero La Muerte
3. Linda
4. Yo Te Lo Dije
5. Pena Por Ti (2016 Version)
6. Contigo
7. Corazón De Acero (2016 Version)
8. Háblame
9. Se Me Desgarra El Alma
10. Amiga Mia
11. Conduelete De Mi
12. Toma Toma

=== Greatest albums ===
- Con Sus Viejos Éxitos (1976)
1. Carinito De Mi Vida
2. Siempre Te Recuerdo A Ti
3. No Me Tortures
4. Yo No Culpo A Nadie
5. Abre Mi Pecho
6. Donde Tu Estas
7. Cuando Estoy Cerca De Ti
8. Tu Eres Mi Vida
9. Tu No Me Quieres A Mi
10. Que Me Castigue Dios
- Con Sus Éxitos (1978)
1. No Te Vayas
2. Yo Te Buscaba
3. Otro Escándalo
4. Te Necesito
5. No Me Quiten La Botella
6. Me Siento Convencido
7. Qué Soledad
8. Cuando Se Quiere Mucho
9. Muchachita De Mi Vida
10. Me Duele Decirte
- 15 Éxitos De Luis Segura (1990)
1. Pena Por Ti
2. Déjame Ya
3. Mi Muchachita
4. Siéntate En Mi Mesa
5. No Me Celes Tanto
6. Se Rompió La Cadena
7. Yo Encontré lo que Buscaba
8. Dicen
9. Yo Quiero Hablarte
10. Amor Por Ti
11. Corazón De Acero
12. Como El Álamo Al Camino
13. Rayito De Sol
14. Tu Nombre
15. Recuérdame
- 20 Grandes Éxitos (1992)
- Disc 1
1. Cariñito De Mi Vida
2. Siempre Te Recuerdo a Ti
3. Donde Tú Estás
4. Que Me Castigue Dios
5. Abre Mi Pecho
6. Yo No Culpo A Nadie
7. Que Destino
8. Ahora Estoy En La Barra
9. Yo No Sé
10. Tú Sabes
- Disc 2
1. Ven Que Me Muero
2. Dime La Verdad
3. Mi Noche Triste
4. Me Estás Acabando
5. ¿Por Qué Dudas De Mí?
6. Ten Compasión De Mí
7. Amada Mía
8. Por Esos Caminos
9. Ya Están Diciendo
10. Llanto

=== Collaborative albums ===
- El Papá De La Bachata, Su Legado (2020)
- Añoñado 1
1. Las Del Mayimbe (Medley) (feat. Anthony Santos)
2. Como El Lucero y la Luna (feat. Danny Rivera)
3. Mi Muchachita (feat. Johnny Ventura)
4. Vete (feat. Fefita La Grande)
5. Cariñito De Mi Vida (feat. Victor Victor)
6. Agonía (feat. Leonardo Paniagua)
7. Pena Por Tí (feat. José Antonio Rodríguez)
8. Me Tiene Loco (feat. Cuco Valoy)
9. Quién Podrá (feat. Niní Cáffaro)
10. El Amargado (feat. Ramón Torres)
- Añoñado 2
1. Las Del Rey Supremo (Medley) (feat. Luis Vargas)
2. Perdido (feat. Charlie Zaa)
3. Déjame Ya (feat. José Alberto "El Canario")
4. Vuelve (feat. Sergio Vargas)
5. Tu No Sabes (feat. Joe Veras)
6. No Voy A llorar (feat. Frank Reyes)
7. Dónde Está Ella (feat. Teodoro Reyes)
8. Ven Que Me Muero (feat. Felix D’ Oleo)
9. No Te Puedo Querer (feat. Vickiana)
10. Para Que Llorar (feat. Kiko Rodriguez)
- Añoñado 3
1. Las Del Cacique (Medley) (feat. Raulín Rodríguez)
2. Celos Sin Razón (feat. Miriam Cruz)
3. No Te Separes De Mí (feat. Sexappeal)
4. Yo No Culpo A Nadie (feat. Fernando Villalona)
5. No Soy Feliz (feat. Luis Miguel Del Amargue)
6. Ella Es Mala (feat. El Chaval)
7. Por Esos Caminos (feat. Pavel Nuñez)
8. Que Tú Tienes (feat. Rubby Pérez)
9. No Te Voy A Dejar (feat. Vakero)
10. Casado y Loco (feat. Andy Andy)
- Añoñado 4
1. Como Yo (feat. Romeo Santos)
2. Traicionera (feat. Secreto "El Famoso Biberón")
3. Si Será Como Un Castigo (feat. Yiyo Sarante)
4. Una Chica Como Tú (feat. Alex Bueno)
5. Cuando Estoy Contigo (feat. Elvis Martínez)
6. Linda (feat. Zacarías Ferreíra)
7. Mátame y Así Termina Todo (feat. Wason Brazobán)
8. No Te Olvido Mami (feat. Alexandra)
9. Dejo Mi Barrio (feat. El Prodigio)
10. Una Copa Más (Medley) (feat. Edward Sssegura)
