= Irina Shayk =

Russian fashion model (born 1986)

- Ирина Шейк
- Shayk in 2026
- Born: Irina Valeryevna Shaykhlislamova; January 6, 1986 (age 40); Yemanzhelinsk, Russian SFSR, Soviet Union
- Partners: Cristiano Ronaldo (2010–2015); Bradley Cooper (2015–2019)
- Children: 1
- Modeling information
- Height: 5 ft 10 in (1.78 m)
- Hair color: Dark Brown
- Eye color: Green
- Agency: The Society Management (New York); Elite Model Management (Paris); Fabbrica Milano Management (Milan); Models 1 (London)

Irina Valeryevna Shaykhlislamova (Russian: Ирина Валерьевна Шайхлисламова; born January 6, 1986), also known as Irina Shayk (/ʃeɪk/), is a Russian fashion model and actress. She received international recognition when she appeared as the first Russian model on the cover of the 2011 Sports Illustrated Swimsuit Issue. She is included in the "New Supers" ranking maintained by the fashion industry website Models.com.

== Early life ==
Shayk was born in Yemanzhelinsk, Chelyabinsk Oblast, in the Russian SFSR of the Soviet Union. Her father, Valery Shaykhlislamov, was a coal miner, while her mother, Olga, was a pianist who worked as a kindergarten music teacher. She grew up with her older sister, Tatiana Petenkova. Shayk has stated that her father was of Tatar descent.

During her childhood, Shayk studied piano and sang in a choir. She attended music school for seven years, an education encouraged by her mother. When Shayk was 14, her father died from pneumonia. After his death, her mother worked multiple jobs to support Shayk and her sister

As a teenager, Shayk was interested in literature and considered a career in journalism. After finishing secondary school, however, she enrolled in a college to study marketing. She also attended a beauty school with her sister, where she was noticed by a modeling scout. In a 2020 interview, Shayk said that modeling agent Giorgi "Guia" Jikidze had sent a scout to her beauty school and subsequently became her manager.

In 2004, Shayk won the Miss Chelyabinsk beauty pageant, an achievement that helped launch her modeling career. She subsequently moved to Paris to pursue professional modeling, initially living in a shared apartment with other aspiring models. Shayk later explained that her primary motivation for entering the industry was to earn money to support her family.

== Career ==
=== Modeling ===
==== 2007–2010: Early years ====
In 2007, Shayk became the face of Italian lingerie brand Intimissimi, succeeding Brazilian model Ana Beatriz Barros. The partnership marked an important step in her early modeling career. That year, she made her debut in the annual Sports Illustrated Swimsuit Issue, subsequently appearing in every edition through 2011. Her early photo shoots for the magazine took place in locations including Arizona, Russia, Italy and Chile.

In 2009, Shayk appeared in the spring/summer advertising campaign for Guess Jeans, photographed by Yu Tsai. In May of that year, she signed with the modeling agency IMG Models.

In 2010, Shayk appeared in the spring/summer advertising campaign for Armani Exchange, photographed by Matthew Scrivens. She also appeared in the music video for Kanye West's single "Power", released in August 2010. In November, she received the Best International Model award at the Glamour Spain Women of the Year Awards in Madrid.

==== 2011–2015: Mainstream success ====
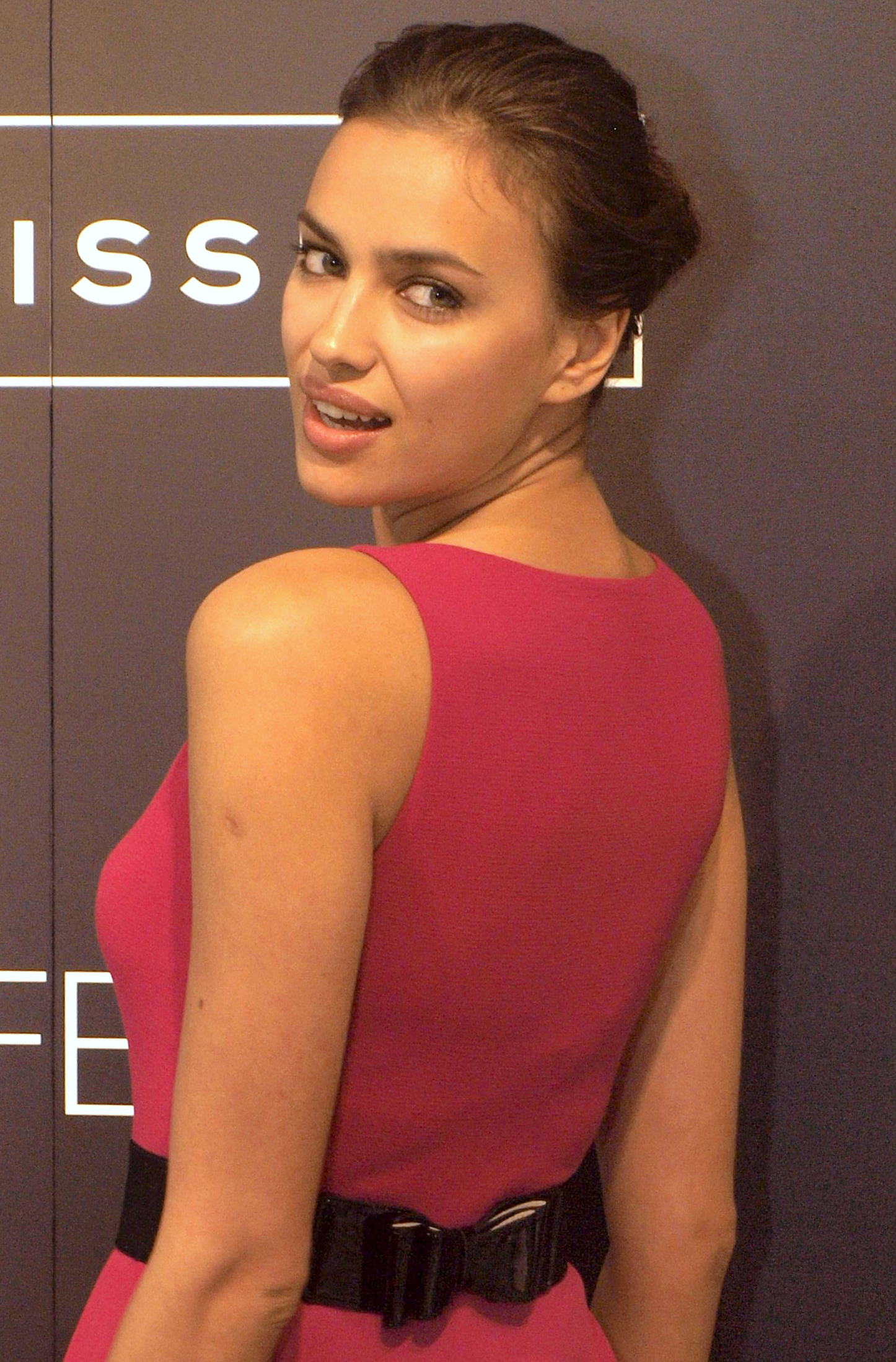
Shayk in Lisbon in 2012

In February 2011, Shayk became the first Russian model to appear on the cover of the annual Sports Illustrated Swimsuit Issue. The cover, photographed in Hawaii, was unveiled during a recording of Late Show with David Letterman on February 14. Shayk had previously appeared in the magazine's swimsuit issue every year since 2007.

In 2012, Shayk replaced Ksenia Sobchak as a judge on the Russian modeling competition Top Model po-russki, an adaptation of America's Next Top Model. Her participation was announced ahead of the show's fourth season, which began airing that September.

Shayk's runway work during this period included appearances for Jeremy Scott and Givenchy in 2013. She walked in Givenchy's autumn/winter 2013 show, designed by Riccardo Tisci, during Paris Fashion Week. In November 2013, she appeared on her first Vogue cover, for the Spanish edition of the magazine. The cover was photographed by Giampaolo Sgura in Ibiza and styled by Claudia Englmann.

In January 2014, Shayk walked in the Desigual autumn/winter 2014–2015 fashion show at 080 Barcelona Fashion, opening and closing the presentation of the brand's "Why?" collection. On February 7, she participated in the opening ceremony of the 2014 Winter Olympics in Sochi, leading the Russian delegation into Fisht Olympic Stadium during the parade of nations.

In October 2015, Shayk was appointed an international spokesperson for the cosmetics company L'Oréal Paris, joining its roster of models and actresses that included Karlie Kloss, Blake Lively, Lara Stone and Natasha Poly.

==== 2016–2022: Continued high-fashion work ====
In 2016, Shayk returned to the lingerie brand Intimissimi for a new advertising campaign, having previously worked with the company at the beginning of her modeling career. In November of that year, she made her runway debut at the Victoria's Secret Fashion Show, held in Paris.

Shayk continued to expand her work in high fashion, appearing on the runways of Givenchy, Moschino, Burberry, Versace and Bottega Veneta. Her runway appearances also included haute couture presentations by Valentino and Jean Paul Gaultier in 2020. In a 2019 profile published by Harper's Bazaar, her modeling agent Ali Kavoussi discussed the efforts involved in broadening her career beyond swimwear and commercial modeling. The publication also highlighted her work for Burberry and her runway appearances for several major fashion houses.

Shayk was also included in the "New Supers" ranking maintained by Models.com.

==== 2023–present: Continued modeling and other projects ====
In January 2023, Shayk participated in Schiaparelli's spring haute couture presentation, wearing a black dress featuring a life-sized artificial lion's head. The design, created by Daniel Roseberry, attracted considerable attention and was part of a collection inspired by Dante Alighieri's Inferno. During the same fashion season, she walked in shows for Mugler, Michael Kors, Bally and Isabel Marant.

In May 2024, Models.com published an interview with Shayk examining her career in the fashion industry, including her collaborations with designers Riccardo Tisci and Donatella Versace and photographers Steven Meisel, Mert and Marcus and Peter Lindbergh. The publication also noted her work on the runways of Mugler, Schiaparelli and Alaïa. That year, she returned to the Victoria's Secret Fashion Show after an eight-year absence, subsequently appearing in its 2025 and 2026 editions.

Shayk made her debut in the Pirelli Calendar with its 2026 edition, photographed by Sølve Sundsbø. The calendar explored elements of nature, with Shayk's photographs representing wind.

On February 26, 2026, Shayk co-hosted the third evening of the 76th Sanremo Music Festival alongside Carlo Conti and Laura Pausini. In September, Shayk walked in Vogue World: Milano, held at the Galleria Vittorio Emanuele II during Milan Fashion Week. She wore an archival design by Gianni Versace from his autumn/winter 1992–1993 "Miss S&M" collection.

=== Acting ===
Shayk made her acting debut as Megara alongside Dwayne Johnson in the 2014 film Hercules.

== Personal life ==
Shayk was in a relationship with Portuguese footballer Cristiano Ronaldo from 2010 to 2015. In January 2015, Ronaldo confirmed that their relationship had ended.

In spring 2015, she started dating American actor Bradley Cooper. Their daughter was born in Los Angeles on March 21, 2017. The couple split up in June 2019.

== Filmography ==
Year	Title	Role
2008	90210	Tanya
2009	The Tudors	Katia
2010	"Power" by Kanye West	Angelic or divine figure
2011	Need for Speed: The Run	Mila Belova
2011	The Ellen DeGeneres Show	Herself, guest
2011	Merlín	Anika
2011	Late Show with David Letterman	Herself, guest
2012	Top Model po-russki	Host and head judge
2013	L'Agent	Beautiful woman
2014	Hercules	Megara
2014	Shameless	Oksana
2014	The Late Late Show with Craig Ferguson	Herself, guest
2014	Winner Stays	Herself, cameo
2014–2017	Love Advent	Herself
2015	"Yo También" by Romeo Santos feat. Marc Anthony	Protagonist, action woman
2016	Inside Amy Schumer	Wife
2016, 2024–2026	Victoria's Secret Fashion Show	Herself
2018	The Assassination of Gianni Versace: American Crime Story	Model
2018	A Star Is Born	Background artist
2020	Cop Show: "The Lawyer"	Herself, siren office
2020–2022	Savage X Fenty Show	Herself, supermodel
2022	"Waareftak" by Majid Al Mohandis	Muse and main romantic interest
2025	"Gorgeous" by Doja Cat	Featured supermodel, special guest
2026	Sanremo Music Festival 2026	Herself, co-host
2027	The Catch	TBA

== Awards and nominations ==
Year	Award	Category	Result	Ref(s)
2010	Glamour Spain Women of the Year Awards	Best International Model	Won	
2011	Marie Claire Prix de la Moda Awards	Model of the Year	Won	
2014	Glamour Russia Women of the Year Awards	Woman of the Year	Won	
2016	Models.com Model of the Year Awards	Model of the Year	Nominated	
2016	Models.com Model of the Year Awards	Social Media Star of the Year	Nominated	
2017	Models.com Model of the Year Awards	Model of the Year	Nominated	
2017	Models.com Model of the Year Awards	Social Media Star of the Year	Nominated	
2019	Models.com Model of the Year Awards	Model of the Year	Nominated	
2019	Models.com Model of the Year Awards	Social Media Star of the Year	Nominated	
2020	Models.com Model of the Year Awards	Model of the Year	Nominated	
2023	Models.com Model of the Year Awards	Model of the Year (Women+)	Nominated	
2024	Models.com Model of the Year Awards	Model of the Year (Women)	Nominated	
2025	Models.com Model of the Year Awards	Model of the Year (Women)	Nominated	
