= Ramón Torres =

Ramón Torres may refer to:

- Ramón Torres Méndez (1809–1885), Colombian painter and lithographer
- Ramón Torres Martínez (1924–2008), Mexican architect
- Ramón Torres (baseball) (born 1993), Dominican baseball infielder
- Ramón Torres (wrestler) (1932–2000), American professional wrestler
- Ramón Torres (singer) (born 1949), Dominican singer-songwriter
- Ramon Torres (politician) (1891–1975), Filipino politician
- Ramón Torres Braschi (1917–1983), Puerto Rican police officer
- Ramon Torres Hernandez (1971–2012), American serial killer
