= Payaso (disambiguation) =

Payaso is a 1986 Philippine comedy drama film.

Payaso may also refer to:

- "Payaso", a song from the Latin pop album Recuerdo a Javier Solís

== See also ==
- Payasos, a song by Romeo Santos with Frank Reyes
