= Utopía (Romeo Santos album) =

Studio album by Romeo Santos
- Released: April 5, 2019
- Recorded: 2018–2019
- Genres: Bachata; tropical
- Length: 48:08
- Label: Sony Latin

Romeo Santos chronology
Golden (2017)	Utopía (2019)	Utopía Live From MetLife Stadium (2021)

Singles from Utopía
- 1. "Inmortal" Released: April 5, 2019; 2. "La Demanda" Released: April 11, 2019; 3. "Payasos" Released: May 23, 2019; 4. "Canalla" Released: June 28, 2019; 5. "Millonario" Released: July 19, 2019; 6. "Me Quedo" Released: August 2, 2019; 7. "Ileso" Released: August 15, 2019; 8. "Amor Enterrado" Released: August 22, 2019; 9. "El Beso Que No Le Di" Released: August 29, 2019; 10. "Años Luz" Released: September 5, 2019; 11. "Los Últimos" Released: September 12, 2019

Utopía is the fourth studio album by American singer Romeo Santos, released on April 5, 2019, by Sony Music Latin. This album featured collaborations with some of the greatest artist in the history of bachata. It also included the reunion of Aventura as Romeo along with Henry, Lenny, and Max would release their first single as a group in 10 years.

== Singles ==
The album was supported by the successful singles: "Inmortal" by Aventura, "La Demanda" with Raulín Rodríguez, "Payasos" with Frank Reyes, "Canalla" with El Chaval de la Bachata, "Millonario" with Elvis Martínez, "Me Quedo" with Zacarías Ferreira, "Ileso" with Teodoro Reyes, "Amor Enterrado" with Joe Veras, "El Beso Que No Le Di" with Kiko Rodríguez, "Años Luz" with Monchy & Alexandra and "Los Últimos" with Luis Vargas. It features guest appearances on every full length track. Every song has its own music video except for the song "Bellas". It might be because it is the only track not owned by Romeo as it belongs to Anthony Santos. Romeo was a featured artist, but the song was not his. Also, it was originally released as a single in 2018 for Anthony Santos' twenty-fourth studio album, La Historia De Mi Vida: El Final, Vol. 1.

== Promotion and tour ==
To promote the album, Santos performed a single concert in the United States at the MetLife Stadium in East Rutherford, New Jersey in front of 80,000 fans on September 21, 2019. It broke the record for the biggest audience to attend the venue, surpassing U2. It was later announced that Santos would embark on a tour of the Dominican Republic called Utopia: La Gira del Pueblo, with Santos explaining that the tour would visit cities he had not previously performed in. The tour consisted of 15 free concerts in 15 different towns and cities between November and December 2019.

In December 2019, Santos announced a reunion tour with Aventura called the Inmortal Tour. It was the band's first American tour since 2009, when they held their tour in support of The Last.

== Commercial performance ==
The album was a commercial success across the United States, Latin America and Europe.

In the United States, the album debuted atop the Billboard Top Latin Albums and Top Tropical Albums charts, becoming Santos' fifth consecutive number-one album on both charts. The album debuted at number eighteen on the Billboard 200, selling 24,000 units in its first week, making it the biggest first week sales of a Latin album released in 2019. On April 2, 2024, the album was certified eleven-times platinum (Latin) for moving 660,000 units in the United States.

== Track listing ==
All tracks are written by Anthony "Romeo" Santos, and Alexander "Chi Chi" Caba except for the intro.

No.	Title	Length
1.	"Intro"	0:38
2.	"Canalla" (with El Chaval de la Bachata)	3:46
3.	"Payasos" (with Frank Reyes)	3:24
4.	"La Demanda" (with Raulín Rodríguez)	3:54
5.	"Millonario" (with Elvis Martínez)	4:01
6.	"El Beso Que No Le Di" (with Kiko Rodriguez)	3:28
7.	"Ileso" (with Teodoro Reyes)	3:38
8.	"Amor Enterrado" (with Joe Veras)	4:01
9.	"Me Quedo" (with Zacarías Ferreira)	3:57
10.	"Los Últimos" (with Luis Vargas)	4:44
11.	"Años Luz" (with Monchy & Alexandra)	3:42
12.	"Bellas" (Antony "El Mayimbe" Santos featuring Romeo Santos)	4:03
13.	"Inmortal" (Aventura)	4:16
Total length:		48:08

- The intro is a cover of Fernando Villalona's "Dominicano Soy".
- Tracks 3 to 12 were also written by Joaquin Diaz.
- Tracks 8 and 11 were also written by Phillip L. Jackson

== Charts ==
=== Weekly charts ===
Chart (2019)	Peak position
Argentine Albums (CAPIF)	13
Chilean Albums (Punto Musical)	1
Dutch Albums (Album Top 100)	67
Mexican Albums (AMPROFON)	30
Italian Albums (FIMI)	53
Spanish Albums (Promusicae)	10
Swiss Albums (Schweizer Hitparade)	25
US Billboard 200	18
US Top Latin Albums (Billboard)	1
US Tropical Albums (Billboard)	1

=== Year-end charts ===
Chart (2019)	Position
US Top Latin Albums (Billboard)	12
Chart (2020)	Position
US Top Latin Albums (Billboard)	30
Chart (2021)	Position
US Top Latin Albums (Billboard)	54

== Certifications ==
Region	Certification	Certified units/sales
Mexico (AMPROFON)	Gold	30,000^{‡}
United States (RIAA)	12× Platinum (Latin)	720,000^{‡}
^{‡} Sales+streaming figures based on certification alone.
