= Schiaparelli =

Schiaparelli may refer to:

== People ==
- Schiaparelli (surname), an Italian surname, and people bearing it

== Fashion ==
- Schiaparelli (fashion house), headquartered in Paris, France

== Astronomy ==
- Schiaparelli (lunar crater)
- Schiaparelli (Martian crater)
- Schiaparelli EDM, a Mars lander
- Schiaparelli Dorsum, a Mercury feature
- Schiaparelli Observatory, in Varese, Italy
- 4062 Schiaparelli, a main-belt asteroid
