= Esta Noche (song) =

2013 single by Raulín Rodríguez

Single by Raulín Rodríguez

from the album Escenas De Amor
- Released: 2013
- Genre: Bachata
- Length: 4:43
- Label: Planet Records
- Songwriter: Argely Aleido Rivas Fernandez

Raulín Rodríguez singles chronology
"A Peso" (2012)	"Esta Noche" (2013)	"Pide Lo Que Quieras" (2014)

Music video
- "Esta Noche" on YouTube

"Esta Noche" (English: "Tonight") is a song by Dominican singer Raulín Rodríguez. This is the third single for his eighteenth studio album Escenas De Amor (2015). The music video was released on December 2, 2013, and currently has over 40 million views as of August 2023. The song was awarded Bachata of the year at the 2014 Soberano Awards.

== Charts ==
Chart (2013)	Peak position
US Hot Latin Songs (Billboard)	23

== Certifications ==
Region	Certification	Certified units/sales
United States (RIAA)	Platinum (Latin)	60,000^{‡}
^{‡} Sales+streaming figures based on certification alone.
