= Inmortal (Aventura song) =

2019 single by Aventura

Single by Aventura

from the album Utopía
- Released: April 5, 2019
- Genre: Bachata
- Length: 4:16
- Label: Sony Latin
- Songwriters: Alexander Caba; Romeo Santos

Romeo Santos singles chronology
"Aullando" (2019)	"Inmortal" (2019)	"La Demanda" (2019)

Aventura singles chronology
"Solo" (2010)	"Inmortal" (2019)	"Volví" (2021)

Music video
- "Inmortal" on YouTube "Inmortal" (Live) on YouTube

"Inmortal" is a song recorded by Aventura released as the lead single from Romeo Santos' fourth studio album Utopía. It is the first single for the band since their split in 2011. The single debuted at number 95 on the Billboard Hot 100 and charted in numerous Latin American countries.

== Background ==
Romeo Santos teased the song on Instagram on April 1, 2019, and promised that it would release that night. However, it turned out to be an April Fools' Day prank, and this angered many fans. Santos apologized to his fans and assured that the single would not be released; however, the following day, Santos officially announced the single and the album, Utopía, explaining that the joke was about the song's release date and not the song itself. "Inmortal" eventually released on April 5, 2019.

== Critical reception ==
Rolling Stone stated that "Inmortal" is a "love letter to longtime Aventura fans."

== Music video ==
The music video for "Inmortal" was directed by Fernando Lugo and filmed in Miami, Florida. It stars all four members of Aventura. In the videoclip, Romeo is shown to have fallen in love with a woman, but the two are separated by a SWAT team that takes Romeo away. Romeo, nude, is held captive in a government lab. The video also shows scenes of Aventura performing in a glass menagerie while surrounded by doctors. The video has over 200 million views on YouTube as of March 2020.

== Live performances ==
Aventura performed "Inmortal" at the 2019 Billboard Latin Music Awards on April 25, 2019.

A live version of the song was released on August 20, 2021. It was based on Romeo Santos's Utopía concert at Metlife Stadium. It served as the main single for Romeo's second live solo album Utopía Live from MetLife Stadium.

== Charts ==
=== Weekly charts ===
Chart (2019)	Peak position
Argentina (Argentina Hot 100)	62
Bolivia (Monitor Latino)	14
Colombia (National-Report)	71
Dominican Republic Bachata (Monitor Latino)	1
Dominican Republic General (Monitor Latino)	7
Ecuador (National-Report)	66
Puerto Rico (Monitor Latino)	1
Spain (PROMUSICAE)	53
US Billboard Hot 100	95
US Hot Latin Songs (Billboard)	5
US Latin Airplay (Billboard)	1
US Tropical Airplay (Billboard)	1
Venezuela (National-Report)	2

=== Year-end charts ===
Chart (2019)	Position
US Hot Latin Songs (Billboard)	23
US Latin Airplay (Billboard)	7
US Tropical Airplay (Billboard)	1

== Certifications ==
Region	Certification	Certified units/sales
Mexico (AMPROFON)	Platinum	60,000^{‡}
Spain (Promusicae)	Platinum	60,000^{‡}
United States (RIAA)	Diamond (Latin)	600,000^{‡}
^{‡} Sales+streaming figures based on certification alone.

== See also ==
- List of Billboard number-one Latin songs of 2019
- List of Billboard Tropical Airplay number ones of 2019
