= List of Billboard Tropical Airplay number ones of 2019 =

The Billboard Tropical Airplay chart is a subchart of the Latin Airplay that ranks the best-performing tropical songs played on Latin radio stations in the United States.

== Chart history ==
Issue date	Song	Artist	Ref
January 5	"Centavito"	Romeo Santos	
January 12	"Centavito"	Romeo Santos	
January 19	"Centavito"	Romeo Santos	
January 26	"Adicto"	Prince Royce + Marc Anthony	
February 2	"Adicto"	Prince Royce + Marc Anthony	
February 9	"Adicto"	Prince Royce + Marc Anthony	
February 16	"Adicto"	Prince Royce + Marc Anthony	
February 23	"Adicto"	Prince Royce + Marc Anthony	
March 2	"Adicto"	Prince Royce + Marc Anthony	
March 9	"Adicto"	Prince Royce + Marc Anthony	
March 16	"Oye Mujer"	Raymix	
March 23	"Tu Vida En La Mia"	Marc Anthony	
March 30	"Tu Vida En La Mia"	Marc Anthony	
April 6	"Tu Vida En La Mia"	Marc Anthony	
April 13	"Tu Vida En La Mia"	Marc Anthony	
April 20	"Inmortal"	Aventura	
April 27	"Inmortal"	Aventura	
May 4	"Inmortal"	Aventura	
May 11	"Inmortal"	Aventura	
May 18	"Inmortal"	Aventura	
May 25	"Inmortal"	Aventura	
June 1	"Inmortal"	Aventura	
June 8	"Inmortal"	Aventura	
June 15	"Inmortal"	Aventura	
June 22	"Inmortal"	Aventura	
June 29	"Inmortal"	Aventura	
July 6	"Aullando"	Wisin & Yandel and Romeo Santos	
July 13	"Inmortal"	Aventura	
July 20	"Aullando"	Wisin & Yandel and Romeo Santos	
July 27	"Inmortal"	Aventura	
August 3	"Inmortal"	Aventura	
August 10	"Inmortal"	Aventura	
August 17	"Si Me Das Tu Amor"	Carlos Vives & Wisin	
August 24	"Parecen Viernes"	Marc Anthony	
August 31	"Parecen Viernes"	Marc Anthony	
September 7	"Inmortal"	Aventura	
September 14	"Inmortal"	Aventura	
September 21	"Inmortal"	Aventura	
September 28	"Parecen Viernes"	Marc Anthony	
October 5	"Parecen Viernes"	Marc Anthony	
October 12	"Parecen Viernes"	Marc Anthony	
October 19	"Parecen Viernes"	Marc Anthony	
October 26	"La Mejor Version de Mi"	Natti Natasha & Romeo Santos	
November 2	"La Mejor Version de Mi"	Natti Natasha & Romeo Santos	
November 9	"La Mejor Version de Mi"	Natti Natasha & Romeo Santos	
November 16	"La Mejor Version de Mi"	Natti Natasha & Romeo Santos	
November 23	"La Mejor Version de Mi"	Natti Natasha & Romeo Santos	
November 30	"La Mejor Version de Mi"	Natti Natasha & Romeo Santos	
December 7	"La Mejor Version de Mi"	Natti Natasha & Romeo Santos	
December 14	"La Mejor Version de Mi"	Natti Natasha & Romeo Santos	
December 21	"Lo Que Te Di"	Marc Anthony	
December 28	"Lo Que Te Di"	Marc Anthony	
