= Años Luz =

2019 single by Romeo Santos with Monchy & Alexandra

Single by Romeo Santos with Monchy & Alexandra

from the album Utopía
- Released: September 5, 2019
- Genre: Bachata
- Length: 3:42
- Label: Sony Latin
- Songwriters: Romeo Santos: Alexander Caba; Joaquin Diaz; Phillip L. Jackson

Romeo Santos singles chronology
"El Beso Que No Le Di" (2019)	"Años Luz" (2019)	"Los Últimos" (2019)

Monchy & Alexandra singles chronology
"Cuando Zarpa El Amor" (2006)	"Años Luz" (2019)

Music video
- "Años Luz" on YouTube

"Años Luz" (English: "Light Years") is a song by American singer Romeo Santos with Dominican singing duo Monchy & Alexandra. It is the tenth single for Santos' fourth studio album Utopía (2019). This is also the first song between Monchy and Alexandra since their split in 2008. The duo reunited only for this song as they continued with their solo careers. The music video was released on September 5, 2019.

== Live performance ==
The duo would reunite one last time at MetLife Stadium to perform the song live along with Santos at his 2019 Utopía concert. The live performance would be featured on Santos' second concert film and live album, Utopía Live from MetLife Stadium.

== Charts ==
Chart (2019)	Peak position
US Tropical Digital Song Sales (Billboard)	13
