= Las Matas de Santa Cruz =

- Location within the Dominican Republic
- Coordinates: 19°40′12″N 71°30′0″W
- Country: Dominican Republic
- Province: Monte Cristi
- Municipality since: 1985

Area
  - Total: 109.51 km^{2} (42.28 sq mi)

Population (2012)
  - Total: 18,756
  - Density: 171.27/km^{2} (443.59/sq mi)
  - Urban: 9,822
- Municipal Districts: 0

Las Matas de Santa Cruz is a small city in the Monte Cristi province of the Dominican Republic.

== Notable people ==
- Nelson Cruz (born 1980) is a Dominican-American professional baseball designated hitter and right fielder.
- Antony Santos (born 1967) is a Dominican singer, songwriter, musician, and producer. He is one of the top-selling Bachata artists of all time.
- Raulín Rodríguez (born June 16, 1971) is a Dominican singer, songwriter, musician, and producer. He is one of the first major bachata artists to have international success and popularize this style of music in the Dominican Republic.
