= Raulín Rodríguez =

Dominican musician (born 1970)

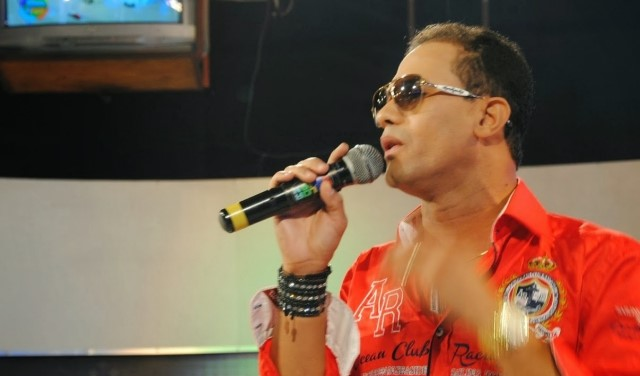
- Raulín Rodríguez performing live.

Background information
- Also known as: El Cacique
- Born: Raulín Marte Rodríguez; June 16, 1970 (age 56); Las Matas de Santa Cruz, Dominican Republic
- Genre: Bachata
- Occupations: Musician; singer
- Instruments: Vocals; guitar
- Years active: 1993–present
- Labels: Platano Records; Cacique Records

Raulín Marte Rodríguez (born June 16, 1970) is a Dominican bachata artist. He is one of the first major bachata artists to have international success. As a pioneer of the bachata genre, he helped grow the genre's popularity in the 1990s. While traditional bachata songs were often risque and suggestive, Raulín Rodríguez's idealized romantic lyrics widened the appeal of the genre of bachata, helping it get regular radio play. Rodriguez is known as "El Cacique" and is one of the most established musicians to ever come from the Dominican Republic. He has many international hits, including the songs: "Nereyda", "Medicina de Amor", "Soledad", Esta Noche, and many more. Three of them have been certified Platinum in the United States by the Recording Industry Association of America (RIAA).

== Early life ==
Rodríguez was born in Las Matas de Santa Cruz, Monte Cristi, Dominican Republic. He is the youngest of four siblings from his mother’s side. His father had more kids after separating from Raulín's mother. Raulin has five other siblings and a step-sister. So he is his father's fourth of ten children. From a young age Raulin wanted a bike, but his sister Casilda Rodriguez told their mother to buy him a guitar instead. His mother took notice and decided to sell two goats to buy him a guitar. Around this time, Dominican bachata musician Luis Vargas helped him get a head start with the guitar. Rodríguez tried to study music, but due to his families economic situation, he wasn't able to join a school for it. However, due to his desire to learn, he learned on his own. At age 14 he joined a school choir. Over time, he would eventually learn how to play bachata and play the guitar to perfection. He grew up in the same village as Dominican bachata singers Luis Vargas and Antony Santos.

== Career ==
=== Early career, The Rise to Fame, and Becoming One of the Top Stars (1987–1999) ===
Raulín, along with his sister Casilda, would start off as a guitar player for Anthony Santos. Both Santos and Rodriguez worked for Luis Vargas until Santos started his own path in 1991. Rodriguez continued to work for Santos until 1993 when he decided to embark on his own path. At the time, a lot of people were telling him how it was a bad idea to leave Santos' group. However, Rodríguez was determined to go on his own as he believed that he was also going to reach popularity. Eventually, he did achieve it. In 1993, he released his debut album Una Mujer Como Tú and gained huge success with songs like "Una Mujer Como Tú", "Que Dolor", "Anoche" and "Fue Como El Viento".

In 1994 he released his second album Regresa Amor which included the singles "Solo Por Ella", "Regresa Amor", and "Nereyda" which is one of the most memorable songs of his career. In the same year, he released his third album Medicina De Amor. The album was named after the single with the same name which became a huge success, thus becoming one of the greatest hits of his career. It also featured the songs "Mujer Infiel" and "Que Vuelva" featuring one of his sisters, which were also successful. From 1995 to 1999 he continued to release more albums and gained more fame with hits like "Dame Corazon", "Si Supieras", "Me la Pusieron Dificil", "La Loca", "Donde ", "Morena Yo Soy Tu Marido", "Me Siento Triste Hoy", "Dame Tu Querer", "Si Algun Dia La Ves", etc.

=== The continuation of his success in the 2000s (2000–2009) ===
In 2000, he released his first live album titled En Vivo (Live). The following year, he released his ninth studio album titled Arrancame La Vida, which included the single which the album was named and the single "Quiero Ser De Ti". In 2002, he released his tenth studio album Derroche De Amor. In the same year, he released his second live album titled Live, Volumen 2. In 2003, he released his eleventh studio album Dímelo. The album included a Spanglish version of the song "Cariño Mío" which featured a musician singing in English. In 2004, he released Si No Te Tengo. It featured remakes of several of the songs from the 2003 album. The songs were "Buscaré Un Nuevo Amor" (now titled "No Engañes Tu Corazón"), "Dios Mío Por Qué" (now titled "Es Mejor"), Que Te Pasa, and a full Spanish version of "Cariño Mío" (now titled "Amor De Mi Vida") with only himself on the track. It also included singles "Ay Hombre" and "Si No Te Tengo", which was the song the album was named after.

In 2005, he released Piel Sin Alma, in which five of its songs became big hits. The following year, he won Bachata Artist of the Year at the 2006 Cassandra Awards (now Soberano Awards). In the same year, he released the album A Dónde Iré Sin Ti, which included the smash hit single "Se Me Salen las Lágrimas". Around this time he started to use a more cowboy-like look. From 2007 to 2008, he released two more albums which included singles like "Culpable" "Que Me Importa Si Tu Te Vas", "Me Sale Del Alma", "Parece Mentiras", and "Pobre Diablo". Rodriguez would eventually stop yearly releases and only release once every 2 or 3 years.

=== Collaborations, Escenas De Amor and Certified singles (2010–2019) ===
In 2010, Rodriguez released Llámame, named after its main single with the same name. This album would feature the voice of Julisa, who is a relative to one of Rodriguez's band members. She is the female voice for the songs "Paz En Este Amor " and "Besos Callejeros". In 2011, he released the single "Te Perdone". In the same year, he was featured along with Luis Vargas and Anthony Santos in Romeo Santos' song "Debate de 4" as part of Romeo's first solo album Formula, Vol. 1. This was considered a historic collaboration for its time as Romeo united 3 musicians who are considered the 3 greatest in the bachata genre. In 2012 he released the single "A Peso".

In 2013, released the single "Esta Noche". The song was a huge success as it peaked at number 23 on the Billboard Hot Latin Songs chart. It was certified Platinum in the United States by the Recording Industry Association of America (RIAA). The following year, it won Bachata of the Year at the 2014 Soberano Awards. He also won Bachata Artist of the year as well. As of August 2023, the music video for the song has over 39 million views on YouTube. It was the main single for Rodriguez's eighteenth studio album, Escenas De Amor. The album was released in 2015 as Rodrigez's 25th overall album. It also included the singles "Te Perdone", "A Peso", "Pide Lo Que Quieras" and "Como Seras Tu" which was certified Platinum in the United States by the Recording Industry Association of America (RIAA) and won Bachata of the year at the 2016 Soberano Awards. In that same event, he was awarded Bachata Artist of the Year for the third time as well.

On October 17, 2017, he released the song "Corazón Con Candado". It peaked in the top ten of the Billboard Tropical Airplay chart. It also peaked at number 1 on both the Monitor Latino's Dominican Republic Bachata and General chart. The single was certified Platinum in the United States by the Recording Industry Association of America (RIAA). It is the main single for his 2018 album Hablamos En La Cama. As of 2023, the song's lyric video has over 40 million views on YouTube. On November 2, 2018, he was featured in a remix of the song "No Te Cambio Por Ninguna" with Jou Kenedy. This would be the first time Rodriguez would get involved with Urban music.

In 2019, he would once again collaborate with American bachata singer Romeo Santos for the song La Demanda. It was part of Santos fourth studio and first collaborative album Utopía. The music video was released on April 12, 2019. In the Billboard charts, the song peaked at number 48 on the Latin Airplay chart, at number 37 on the Hot Latin Songs chart, and at number 9 on the Tropical Airplay chart. It also peaked at number 1 on both the Monitor Latino's Dominican Republic Bachata and General chart. On April 25, 2019, they both performed the song live at the 26th Billboard Latin Music Awards. On September 21, 2019, they would perform together live once again at MetLife Stadium as part of Romeo Santos' Utopía concert. It was featured in Romeo's 2021 concert film Utopía Live from MetLife Stadium. He also performed his 1994 smash hit "Nereyda". However, that part wasn't shown in the concert film.

=== The Continuation of his Career and More Collaborations (since 2020) ===
In 2020, he was featured in a medley of songs with Dominican Bachata singer Luis Segura. The medley was part of Segura's collaborative album El Papá De La Bachata, Su Legado - Añoñado 3 (2020). On February 26, 2021, he released the music video for "Nadie Es Eterno". The audio single was released a year later. On March 24, 2021, he would be part of another historic collaboration when he was featured in the song "Perdóname Amigo Mio" with Dominican Bachata singer Elvis Martínez. On the Monitor Latino's Dominican Republic charts, it peaked at number 2 on the General chart and at number 1 on the Bachata chart. The music video was released on April 23, 2021. Two days later, he released the single "Bien Por Ti". On May 6 he released the single "Noche Pasajera". On the 26 of the same month, he released a special song dedicated to his mother titled "Cumpliste El Rol De Madre" along with his sisters Casilda, Dismania, & Griselda Rodríguez. The single was released around the same week as Dominican Mother's Day. In December of the same year, he released music videos for the songs "Y Nos Dieron Las Diez" and "Me Gustas". The audio singles were released later on in 2022.

On April 22, 2022, he released he would once again be featured in another historic collaboration for his genre as he would be featured in the song "Como Da Vueltas La Vida" with Dominican Bachata singer Joe Veras. In the same year, he released remakes of songs from the 1990s and 2000s and released them as singles. Among them were "Hoy Que Tú Te Vas" from his 1997 album 'Soledad', "Estoy Enamorado De Ti" from his 1999 album Sin Fortuna, "Quiero Ser De Ti" and "Espérame" which both are from his 2001 album Arráncame la Vida. On August 7, 2022, he released the album Mi Álbum De Amor (My Album Of Love). It featured new songs at the time along with more remakes of previous hits like "Si Supieras" from his 1996 album El Amor Da Vida, "Derroche De Sexo" from the 2002 album Derroche De Amor, and "Y Ahora Te Vas" from his 2004 album Si No Te Tengo.

On October 24, 2022, he released "Si Me Eliges" along with Dominican Dembow rappers Toxic Crow and La Insuperable. On December 31, 2022, Rodriguez would end the year with the release of the music video for "He Conocido Un Amor". The audio single was released on January 11, 2023. It peaked at number 1 on both the Monitor Latino's Dominican Republic Bachata and General charts.

== Artistry ==
His style of bachata is traditional. He is also one of the many who have mixed bachata guitar sounds to Merengue songs. Before the 1990s, bachata songs were often risque and suggestive. When Rodríguez came in to the scene in 1993, he would change the dynamic of the genre with his idealized romantic lyrics and style which helped bachata achieve general social acceptability and to receive radio play.

== Legacy ==
Rodríguez is considered one of the greatest bachata artists of all time. He has been dubbed as El Cacique. In Taíno culture, it means native or tribal chief. He is one of the pioneers who modernized bachata in the 1990s.

He has served as an inspiration to many artists including solo artists and bands from the U.S. like Bachata Heightz and Aventura.

== Personal life ==
Rodríguez is a father of two sons, Raul and Raulín Jr., and two daughters, Ariany and Sol De Luna. He is currently married to a woman named Andrea, who currently uses his last name. He is also the uncle of Antony Santos children.

Rodríguez was once the brother in law of Antony Santos. Santos was married to Rodríguez's sister Griselda. They would have kids together, one of them being Jordi, who is also a bachata singer who is currently going under the name Yordi Saints. This also means Rodríguez is their uncle. Santos and Griselda divorced many years later. Rodríguez claims that the divorce ended in bad terms because Santos had caused a lot of emotional and sentimental damage in the family. Since the divorce, both Rodríguez and Santos have not been in good terms with each other. Even though they did collaborate back in 2011 and performed together at Romeo Santos's 2012 concert at the Félix Sánchez Olympic Stadium, they are still real life enemies. In an interview with New York Latin radio station La Mega 97.9 in 2015, he claimed that Santos had hurt his sister badly and that he owes his sister and mother an apology. Unfortunately, Rodríguez's mother had died in 2018. He also claimed that Santos had disrespected him during Romeo's concert at the Olympic Stadium in Santo Domingo. They both saw each other back stage and Santos had allegedly asked him that why was he at the event and Santos also told him that the stage they were on wasn't for him, even though Rodríguez is one of the most established artist from Dominican Republic. Santos has denied all of Rodríguez's accusations.

== Discography ==
=== Studio albums ===
- Una Mujer Como Tú (1993)
- Regresa Amor (1994)
- Medicina de Amor (1994)
- El Amor Da Vida (1995)
- Me La Pusieron Dificil (Rompió Las Cadenas) (1996)
- Soledad (1997)
- Corazón, Corazón (1998)
- Sin Fortuna (1999)
- Arráncame La Vida (2001)
- Derroche De Amor (2002)
- Dímelo (2003)
- Si No Te Tengo (2004)
- Piel Sin Alma (2005)
- A Dónde Iré Sin Ti (2006)
- La Carretera (2007)
- Parece Mentira (2008)
- Llámame (2010)
- Escenas De Amor (2015)
- Hablamos En La Cama (2018)
- Mi Álbum De Amor (2022)
- En Bolero, Guaracha y Bachata (2023)

=== Live Albums ===
- En Vivo (2000)
- Live Vol. 2 (2002)
- Esta Noche (En Vivo) (2022)
- Que Vuelva (En Vivo) (2022)
- Nereyda (En Vivo) (2022)
- Dame Corazón (En Vivo) (2022)
- Una Mujer Como Tu (En Vivo) (2022)
- Culpable (2023)
- Bachatas Clásicas (Live Edition) (with Anthony Santos) (2024)

=== Compilation Albums ===
- Grandes Éxitos (2001)
- Todo Éxitos (2004)
- Éxitos De Raulín Rodríguez (2007)
- Mega MixHits (2011)
- Uniquehits (2014)
- 1 (2015)
- 30 Años De Trayectoria (2019)
- BachaGOAT (2022)
- "Éxitos Del Cacique" (2024)
- Bachatas Clásicas Más Pegadas Del Cacique (2024)

=== Collaborative Compilation Albums ===
- Frente A Frente: Dos Estrellas En Uno (with Antony Santos) (2000)
- Frente A Frente: Dos Estrellas En Uno (with Luis Segura) (2000)
- 2 Grandes De La Bachata, Vol. 1 (with Monchy & Alexandra) (2006)
