= Los Últimos =

2019 single by Romeo Santos with Luis Vargas

Single by Romeo Santos with Luis Vargas

from the album Utopía
- Released: September 12, 2019
- Genre: Bachata
- Length: 4:44
- Label: Sony Latin
- Songwriters: Romeo Santos: Alexander Caba; Joaquin Diaz

Romeo Santos singles chronology
"Años Luz" (2019)	"Los Últimos" (2019)	"La Mejor Versión De Mí (Remix)" (2019)

Luis Vargas singles chronology
"Mal Herido" (2019)	"Los Últimos" (2019)	"La Serpiente" (2020)

Music video
- "Los Últimos" on YouTube

"Los Últimos" (English: "The Last Ones") is a song by American singer Romeo Santos with Dominican singer Luis Vargas. It is the eleventh and final single for Santos' fourth studio album Utopía (2019). The music video was released on September 12, 2019.

== Charts ==
Chart (2019)	Peak position
Dominican Republic Bachata (Monitor Latino)	9
