= Schiaparelli (surname) =

Schiaparelli (pronounced [skjapaˈrɛlli]) is an Italian surname from Piedmont. Notable people with the surname include:

- Celestino Schiaparelli (1841–1919), Italian Arabist and philologist
- Elsa Schiaparelli (1890–1973), Italian fashion designer
- Ernesto Schiaparelli (1856–1928), Italian Egyptologist
- Giovanni Schiaparelli (1835–1910), Italian astronomer and science historian
- Luigi Schiaparelli (1871–1934), Italian historian, palaeographer and diplomat

== See also ==
- Alejandro Schiapparelli (born 1980), Argentine football manager and former player
