= Ramón Torres (singer) =

Dominican singer-songwriter

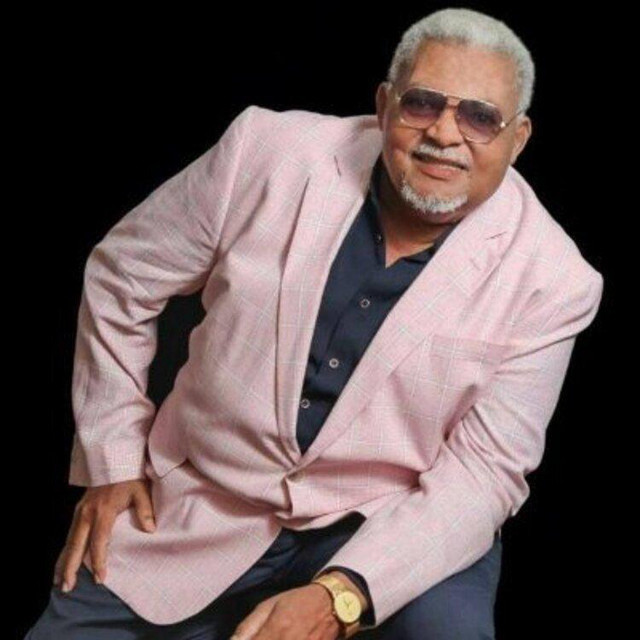

Background information
- Birth name: Francisco Pache Torres
- Also known as: El Poeta de la bachata
- Born: July 18, 1949 (age 75); Higüey, Dominican Republic
- Genres: Bachata; Tropical Music
- Occupations: Singer; songwriter
- Instruments: Vocals; Accordion; guitar
- Years active: 1997–present

Francisco Pache Torres (born Higüey, Dominican Republic, July 18, 1949), better known by his stage name 'Ramón Torres' , is a Dominican singer-songwriter. He is considered to be one of the pioneers of modern Bachata for his role in redefining the genre by including romantic lyrics, guitar melodies, and implementation of new instruments such as the piano and the accordion.

== Biography ==
=== Early years ===
Ramón Torres was born on July 18, 1949, in Higüey, Dominican Republic, the son of Dominican parents (Ruperto Pache and Catalina Torres). Since he was 10 years old, he began working as an occasional laborer and took his last courses at night school.

=== Music career ===
In 1987, as a result of his being liquidated from the free trade zone company, he moved to Santo Domingo where he recorded his first single «Las estrellas brillarán», under the label of Radio Guarachita by Radhamés Aracena. Some of his recorded songs were «The second letter, «With you until the end», «My great secret», «What are words for?», «You are mine», among others.

In 2019, during the People's Tour, El bachatero Romeo Santos took Ramón Torres as one of his guests to the city of La Romana, with whom he performed "Your Letters Come".

== Discography ==
=== Studio albums ===
- Love delicately (1990)
- I made her a woman (1994)
- The woman on the train (1998)
- My Saint John (2002)
- The king of bachateo (2002)
- If I had died yesterday (2014)
- Between yesterday and today (2014)
- Coffee with milk (2015)
- My successes (2016)
