= Perjurio =

Promotional single by Romeo Santos

from the album Golden
- Released: July 21, 2017 (album release)
- Recorded: 2017
- Genre: Bachata
- Length: 3:33
- Label: Sony Music
- Songwriters: Anthony "Romeo" Santos; Philip Jackson

"Perjurio" (English: "Perjury") is a song by American singer Romeo Santos. It is part of his third studio album Golden (2017). This song would cause controversy due to the lyrics of the song. The song is about a man who seduces a girl who's about to turn 18. Santos would explain that the song was taken out of context. That the male character in this song could have been 19, 20, or even the same age as the girl.

== Chart performance ==
Chart (2017–2018)	Peak position
US Hot Latin Songs (Billboard)	47
US Tropical Airplay (Billboard)	21
