= La Demanda =

2019 single by Romeo Santos with Raulín Rodríguez

Single by Romeo Santos with Raulín Rodríguez

from the album Utopía
- Released: April 11, 2019
- Genre: Bachata
- Length: 4:16
- Label: Sony Latin
- Songwriters: Romeo Santos: Alexander Caba; Joaquin Diaz

Romeo Santos singles chronology
"Inmortal" (2019)	"La Demanda" (2019)	"Payasos" (2019)

Raulín Rodríguez singles chronology
"No Te Cambio por Ninguna (Remix)" (2018)	"La Demanda" (2019)	"Dale Pa'lla" (2019)

Music video
- "La Demanda" on YouTube

"La Demanda" (English: "The Law Suite" / "The Demand") is a song by American singer Romeo Santos with Dominican singer Raulín Rodríguez. This is the second single for Santos' fourth studio album Utopía (2019). The music video was released on April 11, 2019. It was filmed in Dominican Republic. It was directed and produced by Joaquín Cambre. It's about two men who are in love with the same woman and they are sending her to court for being with them while not knowing of each other.

== Charts ==
=== Weekly charts ===
Chart (2019)	Peak position
Dominican Republic Bachata (Monitor Latino)	1
Dominican Republic General (Monitor Latino)	1
US Hot Latin Songs (Billboard)	37
US Latin Airplay (Billboard)	48
US Tropical Airplay (Billboard)	9

=== Year-end charts ===
Chart (2019)	Position
US Tropical Airplay (Billboard)	15
