= Canalla =

2019 single by Romeo Santos with El Chaval De La Bachata

Single by Romeo Santos with El Chaval de la Bachata

from the album Utopía
- Released: June 28, 2019
- Genre: Bachata
- Length: 3:46
- Label: Sony Latin
- Songwriter: Romeo Santos: Alexander Caba

Romeo Santos singles chronology
"Payasos" (2019)	"Canalla" (2019)	"Millonario" (2019)

El Chaval De La Bachata singles chronology
"La Victima" (2018)	"Canalla" (2019)	"Yo Soy Un Macho (Remix)" (2019)

Music video
- "Canalla" on YouTube

"Canalla" (English: "Scoundrel") is a song by American singer Romeo Santos with Dominican singer El Chaval de la Bachata. It is the fourth single for Santos' fourth studio album Utopía (2019). The music video was released on June 28, 2019. It was filmed in Dominican Republic. It was directed and produced by Fernando Lugo. The female lead was portrayed by Sarodj Bertin. The song is featured as a soundtrack for Grand Theft Auto VI.

== Charts ==
=== Weekly charts ===
Chart (2019)	Peak position
Dominican Republic Bachata (Monitor Latino)	2
Dominican Republic General (Monitor Latino)	7
US Hot Latin Songs (Billboard)	26
US Latin Airplay (Billboard)	21
US Tropical Airplay (Billboard)	2

=== Year-end charts ===
Chart (2019)	Position
US Tropical Airplay (Billboard)	8
Chart (2020)	Position
US Tropical Airplay (Billboard)	10
