= Me Quedo =

2019 single by Romeo Santos with Zacarías Ferreíra

Single by Romeo Santos with Zacarías Ferreíra

from the album Utopía
- Released: August 2, 2019
- Genre: Bachata
- Length: 3:57
- Label: Sony Latin
- Songwriters: Romeo Santos: Alexander Caba; Joaquin Diaz

Romeo Santos singles chronology
| "Millonario" (2019) | "Me Quedo" (2019) | "Ileso" (2019) |

Zacarías Ferreíra singles chronology
| "Yo Que Te Amaba" (2019) | "Me Quedo" (2019) | "El Pasado" (2019) |

Music video
- "Me Quedo" on YouTube

"Me Quedo" (English: "I'll Stay") is a song by American singer Romeo Santos with Dominican singer Zacarías Ferreíra. It is the sixth single for Santos' fourth studio album Utopía (2019). The music video was released on August 2, 2019. It was directed and produced by Fernando Lugo.

== Charts ==
=== Weekly charts ===
| Chart (2019) | Peak position |
|---|---|
| Dominican Republic Bachata (Monitor Latino) | 1 |
| Dominican Republic General (Monitor Latino) | 3 |
| US Hot Latin Songs (Billboard) | 34 |
| US Latin Airplay (Billboard) | 39 |
| US Tropical Airplay (Billboard) | 8 |

=== Year-end charts ===
| Chart (2019) | Position |
|---|---|
| US Tropical Airplay (Billboard) | 13 |
