= Ileso =

2019 single by Romeo Santos with Teodoro Reyes

Single by Romeo Santos with Teodoro Reyes

from the album Utopía
- Released: August 15, 2019
- Genre: Bachata
- Length: 3:38
- Label: Sony Latin
- Songwriters: Romeo Santos: Alexander Caba; Joaquin Diaz

Romeo Santos singles chronology
"Me Quedo" (2019)	"Ileso" (2019)	"Amor Enterrado" (2019)

Teodoro Reyes singles chronology
"La Última Carta" (2019)	"Ileso" (2019)	"Baila Conmigo" (2019)

Music video
- "Ileso" on YouTube

"Ileso" (English: "Unscathed") is a song by American singer Romeo Santos with Dominican singer Teodoro Reyes. It is the seventh single for Santos' fourth studio album Utopía (2019). The music video was released on August 15, 2019. It was directed and produced by Fernando Lugo.

== Charts ==
Chart (2019)	Peak position
Dominican Republic Bachata (Monitor Latino)	3
US Tropical Airplay (Billboard)	13
