= Millonario =

2019 single by Romeo Santos with Elvis Martínez

Single by Romeo Santos with Elvis Martínez

from the album Utopía
- Released: July 19, 2019
- Genre: Bachata
- Length: 4:01
- Label: Sony Latin
- Songwriters: Romeo Santos: Alexander Caba; Joaquin Diaz

Romeo Santos singles chronology
| "Canalla" (2019) | "Millonario" (2019) | "Me Quedo" (2019) |

Elvis Martínez singles chronology
| "Infieles" (2019) | "Millonario" (2019) | "Hasta Que Salga El Sol" (2019) |

Music video
- "Millonario" on YouTube

"Millonario" (English: "Millionaire") is a song by American singer Romeo Santos with Dominican singer Elvis Martínez. It is the fifth single for Santos' fourth studio album Utopía (2019).

== Music video ==
The music video was released on July 19, 2019. It was filmed in New York. It was directed and produced by Fernando Lugo. The video starts with Santos sitting on the floor with a guitar while Martínez, who is sitting next to him, holding a sign that says "Quiero Ser Millonario" which in Spanish means "I want to be a millionaire". Then it shows them about to rob a bank until the people in the bank (Jesnely Avilés, Rubén Toledo y Jovani Vazquez)receive them with happieness. They would become rich with the loves of their lives. At the end it was all a dream and they would be awakened by a girl who saw them a sleep.

== Charts ==
| Chart (2019) | Peak position |
|---|---|
| Dominican Republic Bachata (Monitor Latino) | 1 |
| Dominican Republic General (Monitor Latino) | 2 |
