= El Beso Que No Le Di =

2019 single by Romeo Santos with Kiko Rodríguez

- Cover of the amazon original version.

Single by Romeo Santos with Kiko Rodríguez

from the album Utopía
- Released: August 22, 2019
- Genre: Bachata
- Length: 3:38
- Label: Sony Latin
- Songwriters: Romeo Santos: Alexander Caba; Joaquin Diaz

Romeo Santos singles chronology
"Amor Enterrado" (2019)	"El Beso Que No Le Di" (2019)	"Años Luz" (2019)

Kiko Rodríguez singles chronology
"Lloro" (2019)	"El Beso Que No Le Di" (2019)	"Obsesionado Contigo" (2020)

Music video
- "El Beso Que No Le Di" on YouTube

"El Beso Que No Le Di" (English: "The Kiss That I Did Not Give") is a song by American singer Romeo Santos with Dominican singer Kiko Rodríguez. It is the ninth single for Santos' fourth studio album Utopía (2019). The music video was released on August 22, 2019. It features Santos and Rodríguez at a church watching as the woman they're in love with is to be married to another man. On October 2, 2020, Santos released a different version by himself as an Amazon Original single.

== Charts ==
Chart (2019)	Peak position
Dominican Republic Bachata (Monitor Latino)	2
Dominican Republic General (Monitor Latino)	18
US Hot Latin Songs (Billboard)	34
US Tropical Airplay (Billboard)	7

== Certifications ==
Region	Certification	Certified units/sales
Mexico (AMPROFON)	Platinum	60,000^{‡}
^{‡} Sales+streaming figures based on certification alone.
