= Amor Enterrado =

2019 single by Romeo Santos with Joe Veras

Single by Romeo Santos with Joe Veras

from the album Utopía
- Released: August 22, 2019
- Genre: Bachata
- Length: 3:38
- Label: Sony Latin
- Songwriters: Romeo Santos: Alexander Caba; Joaquin Diaz; Phillip L. Jackson

Romeo Santos singles chronology
"Ileso" (2019)	"Amor Enterrado" (2019)	"El Beso Que No Le Di" (2019)

Joe Veras singles chronology
"Quitarte El Estrés" (2018)	"Amor Enterrado" (2019)	"Que Poder Tiene Ella" (2019)

Music video
- "Amor Enterrado" on YouTube

Amor Enterrado (English: "Buried Love") is a song by American singer Romeo Santos with Dominican singer Joe Veras. It is the eighth single for Santos' fourth studio album Utopía (2019). The music video was released on August 22, 2019. It was directed and produced by Fernando Lugo.

== Charts ==
Chart (2019)	Peak position
Dominican Republic Bachata (Monitor Latino)	10
US Hot Latin Songs (Billboard)	45
