= Blas Durán =

Dominican singer (1949–2023)

Blas Durán (3 February 1941 – 28 March 2023) was a Dominican singer. Durán first became known through the song "Clavelito" (1970), but is best known for the introduction of electric guitar into bachata music with his 1986 bachata-merengue "Consejo a las mujeres".
