= Payasos =

2019 single by Romeo Santos with Frank Reyes

Single by Romeo Santos with Frank Reyes

from the album Utopía
- Released: May 23, 2019
- Genre: Bachata
- Length: 3:24
- Label: Sony Latin
- Songwriters: Romeo Santos: Alexander Caba; Joaquin Diaz

Romeo Santos singles chronology
"La Demanda" (2019)	"Payasos" (2019)	"Canalla" (2019)

Frank Reyes singles chronology
"Vientos De Navidad" (2018)	"Payasos" (2019)	"Por Ti No Sufro" (2019)

Music video
- "Payasos" on YouTube

"Payasos" (English: "Clowns") is a song by American singer Romeo Santos with Dominican singer Frank Reyes. It is the third single for Santos' fourth studio album Utopía (2019). The music video was released on May 23, 2019. It was filmed in Washington Heights, New York City. Most of it was filmed at the United Palace. It was directed and produced by Joaquín Cambre.

== Charts ==
=== Weekly charts ===
Chart (2019)	Peak position
Dominican Republic Bachata (Monitor Latino)	3
US Hot Latin Songs (Billboard)	32
US Tropical Airplay (Billboard)	17

=== Year-end charts ===
Chart (2019)	Position
US Tropical Airplay (Billboard)	50
