= Zacarías Ferreira =

Dominican singer

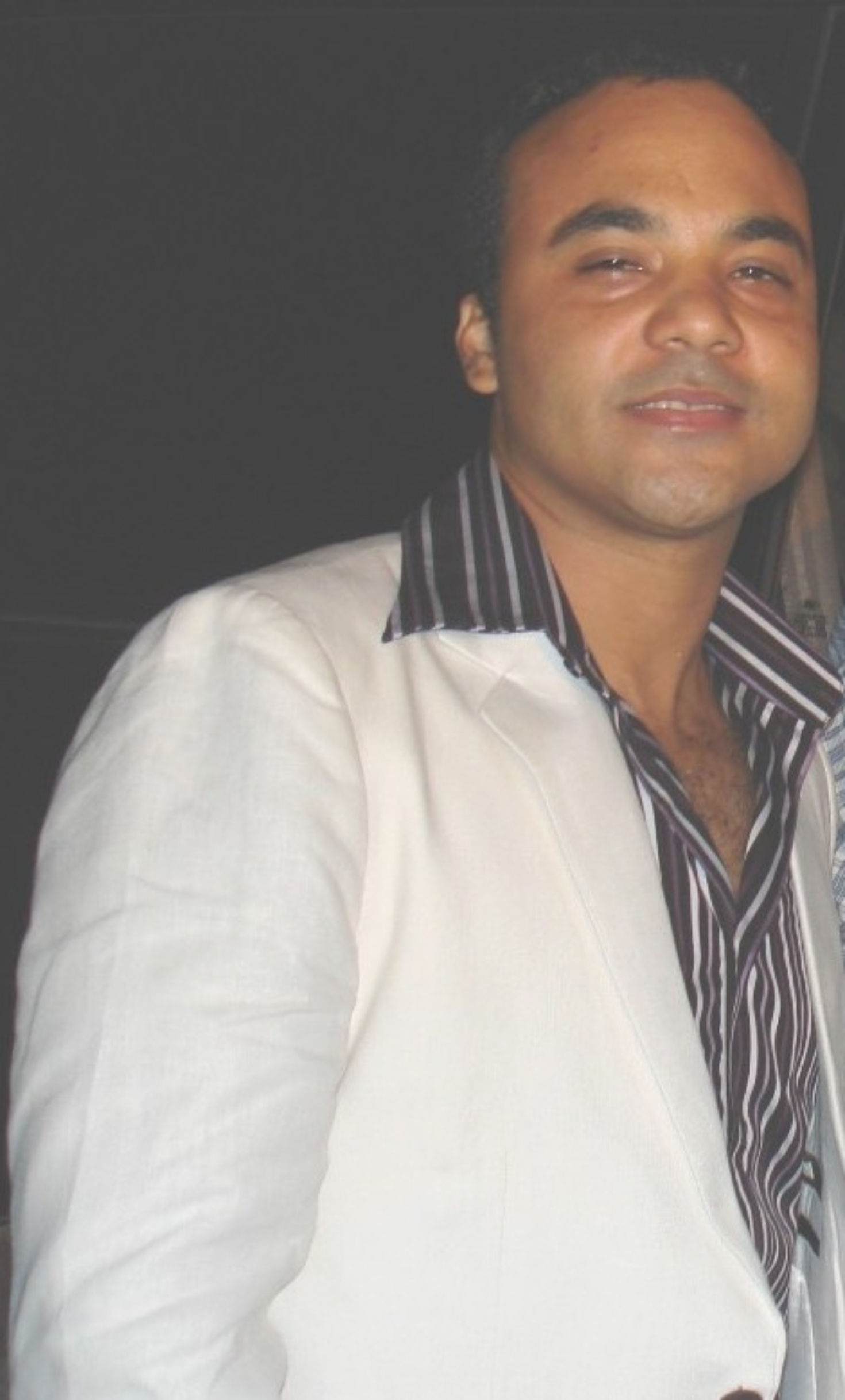
- Ferreira in 2007

Background information
- Also known as: La Voz de la Ternura
- Born: Zacarías Ferreira de la Cruz; 10 October 1968 (age 57); Canca Arriba, Tamboril, Dominican Republic
- Genres: Bachata; Merengue
- Occupations: Singer; musician
- Instruments: Vocals; guitar
- Years active: 1997–present
- Labels: Discomania; Campesino Entertainment Group; J&N Records; Mayimba Music, Inc.; Sunflower Ent. Co., Inc.
- Website: www.zacariasferreirard.com

Zacarías Ferreira (born 10 October 1968) is a Dominican singer. He is a Bachata artist known worldwide for his hits such as "Es Tan Dificil", "Asesina", "La Mejor de Todas", "Mañana en tu Olvido", "Amiga Veneno", "La Avispa" among others. He is one of the most representative voices in bachata. He is known as "La Voz de la Ternura" because of his soft and melodic voice.

== Early life ==
Ferreira was born in 1968 in the town of Amaceyes Tamboril, near Santiago in the Cibao region of the north-western Dominican Republic. Born into a family of musicians and singers, it is not surprising that he dreamed of a musical career as a child. His family filled his childhood home with music spurring Zacarías on to dream of becoming a musical artist. As a young man, his dream motivated him to leave for the country's capital, Santo Domingo, where he joined the Conservatorio Nacional and also sang in a local bachata group because he had to "earn a living." Ferreira then became a member of the Brugal rum company orchestra, where he remained for five years.

== Music career ==
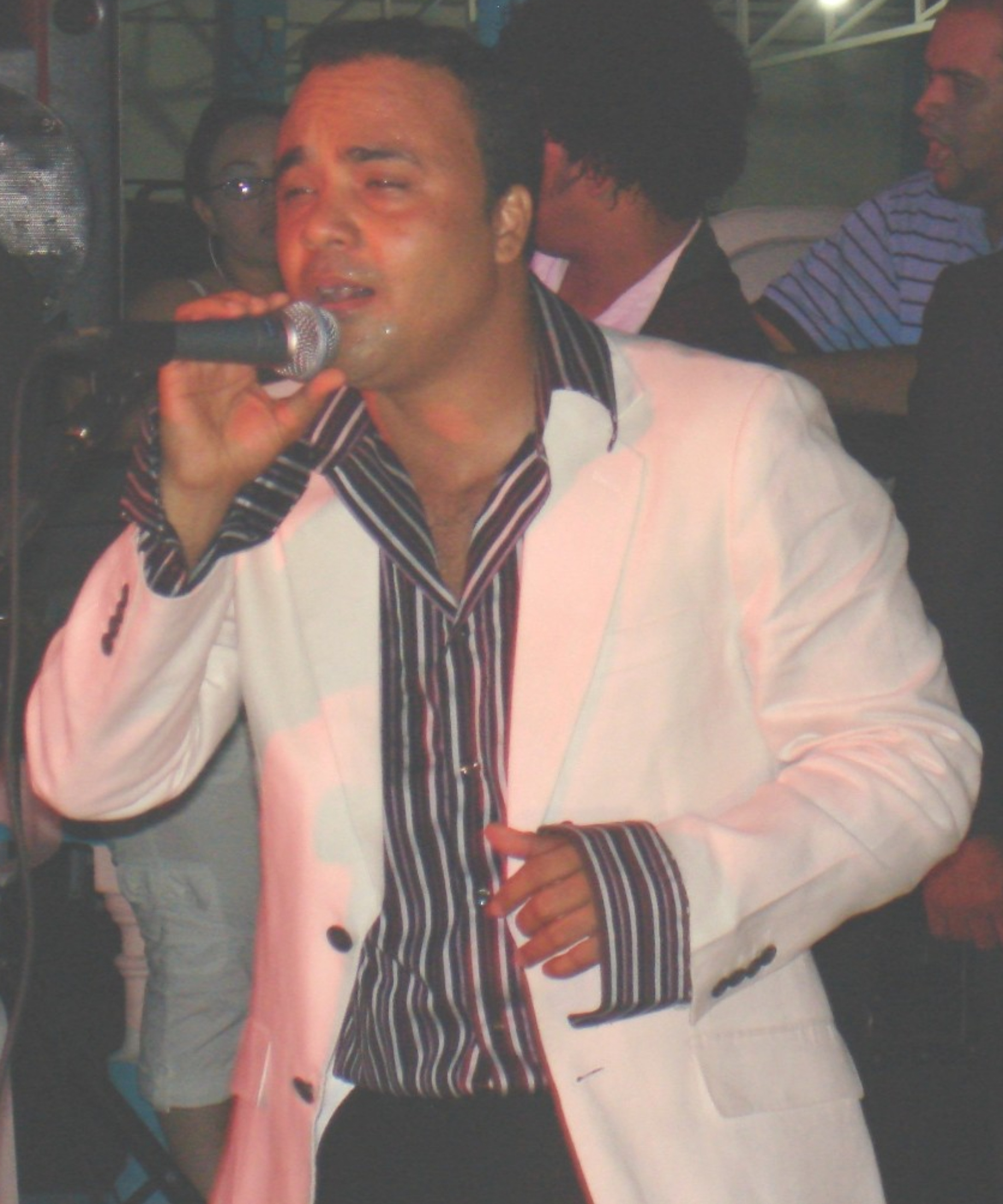
Zacarías Ferreira performing in 2007

Ferreira entered onto the bachata scene in 1997 with his debut album, Me Liberé. The album won the prestigious Dominican music award, the Cassandra. Three years later his second album, El Triste, won the award for him for a second time. Ferreira became the first bachatero to perform at the Festival de Presidente. In the winter of 2001, Ferreira traveled to the United States for the first time and played 77 gigs in just six and a half weeks in New York City. In 2002, He was the first bachatero to perform at the world-renowned S.O.Bs nightclub in Manhattan, New York City. Alongside Jose Manuel "El Sultan" and Lenny from Aventura, he is one of the first bachateros to incorporate blues and rock elements into the genre. In 2002, he would record one of his biggest hits of all time, "Amiga Veneno" where he incorporated blues and rock elements like adding the wah effect and an electric guitar solo. The song would take Ferreira intro the Latin mainstream. He then continued to release successful albums each year, spawning hits such as "Dime Que Falto", "Cuanto Duele Que Te Vas", "La Bomba", "Quedate Conmigo", "Me ilusioné", "Diez Segundos (feat. Yenddi)", "Te Lo Pido a Gritos", and many more. In 2019, Ferreira was featured in the song "Me Quedo" with Romeo Santos. The song is off Romeo's album, Utopía.

== Personal life ==
On 17 August 2010, Ferreira inaugurated Escuela Primaria de Amaceyes Arriba, which he rebuilt with his longtime friend Elvis Jesús Rodríguez.

== Discography ==
=== Studio albums ===
- Me Liberé (1997)
- El Triste (2000)
- Adiós (2001)
- Novia Mia (2002)
- El Amor Vencerá (2004)
- Quiéreme (2005)
- Dime Que Faltó (2007)
- Te Dejo Libre (2009)
- Quédate Conmigo (2011)
- Mi Dulzura (2012)
- Me Gusta Todo De Ti (2014)
- Quiero Ser Tu Amor (2016) (An extended version of Me Gusta Todo De Ti)
- El Amor (2017)
- Que Yo Soy Asi (2019)
- Nunca (2019)
- Contigo (2021)

=== Live albums ===
- En Vivo (2001)

=== Compilation albums ===
- 12 Éxitos (2006)
- La Voz De La Ternura: Éxitos (2006)
- 14 Exitos (2007)
- Historia De Un Ídolo (2008)
- Lo Mejor De Lo Mejor (2010)
- Mega Mix Hits (2011)
- 1 (2015)
- Es Tan Difícil (2019)
- Más Romántico Que Nunca (2019)
- Te Fuiste En Rojo (2021)
- Esenciales (2023)
