= Elvis Martínez (singer) =

Dominican singer

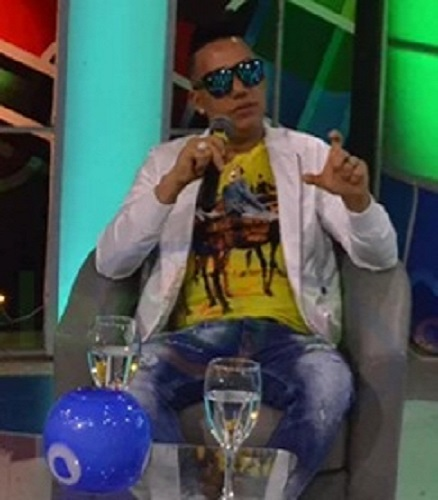
- Elvis in an interview in 2020

Background information
- Also known as: El Camaron; El Jefe De La Bachata
- Born: January 5, 1976 (age 50); San Francisco de Macorís, Dominican Republic
- Genres: Bachata; Latin pop; urbano
- Occupations: Singer; musician
- Instruments: Vocals; guitar
- Years active: 1998–present
- Labels: Premium Latin Music; Univison Records; Universal Music Latino; Camaron Records
- Website: elvismartinez.com

Elvis Martínez a.k.a. El Camarón (born January 5, 1976) is a Dominican singer. He is a well known bachata artist known for hits such as "Maestra", "La Luz De Mis Ojos", "Asi Te Amo", "Yo Te Voy Amar", "Laudano", "Directo al Corazon", "El Profesor", "Aventura", among others.

== Early life ==
Martínez was born in 1976 in San Francisco de Macorís, Dominican Republic. Martínez grew up in a poor family with his twelve brothers. As a child he worked as a shoe shiner, then as a bakery assistant. These were just some of the jobs he had to perform to help at home. This prevented him from finishing school. He moved to New York sometime in the early 90s. There he met Lenny Santos, one of the members of the soon to be group Aventura, one of the biggest Bachata acts ever. Santos taught Martínez how to play the guitar.

== Music career ==
In the mid 90s, Martínez signed with the label Premium Latin Music and released his solo debut album "Todo Se Paga" in 1998. The album was produced by Lenny Santos. The album proved popular as well as critically successful, winning an ACE Award in the category of Revelación del Año (awarded by La Asociación de Cronistas de Espectáculos de Nueva York—in English, the Association of Latin Entertainment Critics). This album contained hits like "Asi Fue" and "Me Seguiras Buscando".

Martínez released his second studio album "Directo Al Corazon" in 1999, also produced by Lenny. This album also did commercially well, spawning hits such as "Bailando Con El", "Tu Sabes Bien", and "Directo Al Corazon". He released three additional albums on Premium Latin Music— Tres Palabras (2002), Así Te Amo (2003), and Descontrolado (2004) and enjoyed further success; for example, "Así Te Amo" won a Casandra Award in 2004 for Best Song of the Year. Martínez was nominated for a Premio Lo Nuestro award in 2004 for Best Traditional Tropical Artist.

Martínez subsequently left Premium Latin Music (which consequently released the greatest-hits album La Historia de Elvis Martínez in 2005) and switched to Univision Records for Yo Soy Más Grande Que Él (2005). His best-selling album to date, Yo Soy Más Grande Que Él featured the hit singles "Tu Traición" and "Yo No Nací Para Amar". The partnership with Univision was short lived, however, as Martínez switched labels once again, moving to Universal Music Group for La Luz de Mis Ojos (2007), which spawned the hit single "Lento y Suave". He then went back to his first label Premium Latin and released "Esperanza" in 2012.

Martínez was featured on Millonario on Romeo Santos album Utopia (2019). The song was produced by Lenny Santos. In 2021, he collaborated with Prince Royce in the Song Veterana.

== Discography ==
=== Studio albums ===
- Todo Se Paga (1998)
- Directo Al Corazón (1999)
- Tres Palabras (2000)
- Así Te Amo (2003)
- Descontrolado (2004)
- Yo Soy Más Grande Que Él (2005)
- La Luz De Mis Ojos (2007)
- Esperanza (2012)
- Yo Vivo Por Ti (2019)
- Mi Muchachita (2022)

=== Live albums ===
- Bachata En Vivo, Vol. 1 (2022)
- Bachata En Vivo, Vol. 2 (2023)
- Bachata En Vivo, Vol. 3 (2024)

=== Compilation albums ===
- Toda Una Aventura (with Aventura) (2001)
- La Historia de Elvis Martínez (2005)
- Grandes Exítos (with Aventura) (2006)

== See also ==
- Music of the Dominican Republic
