= Luis Vargas (musician) =

Dominican musician (born 1961)

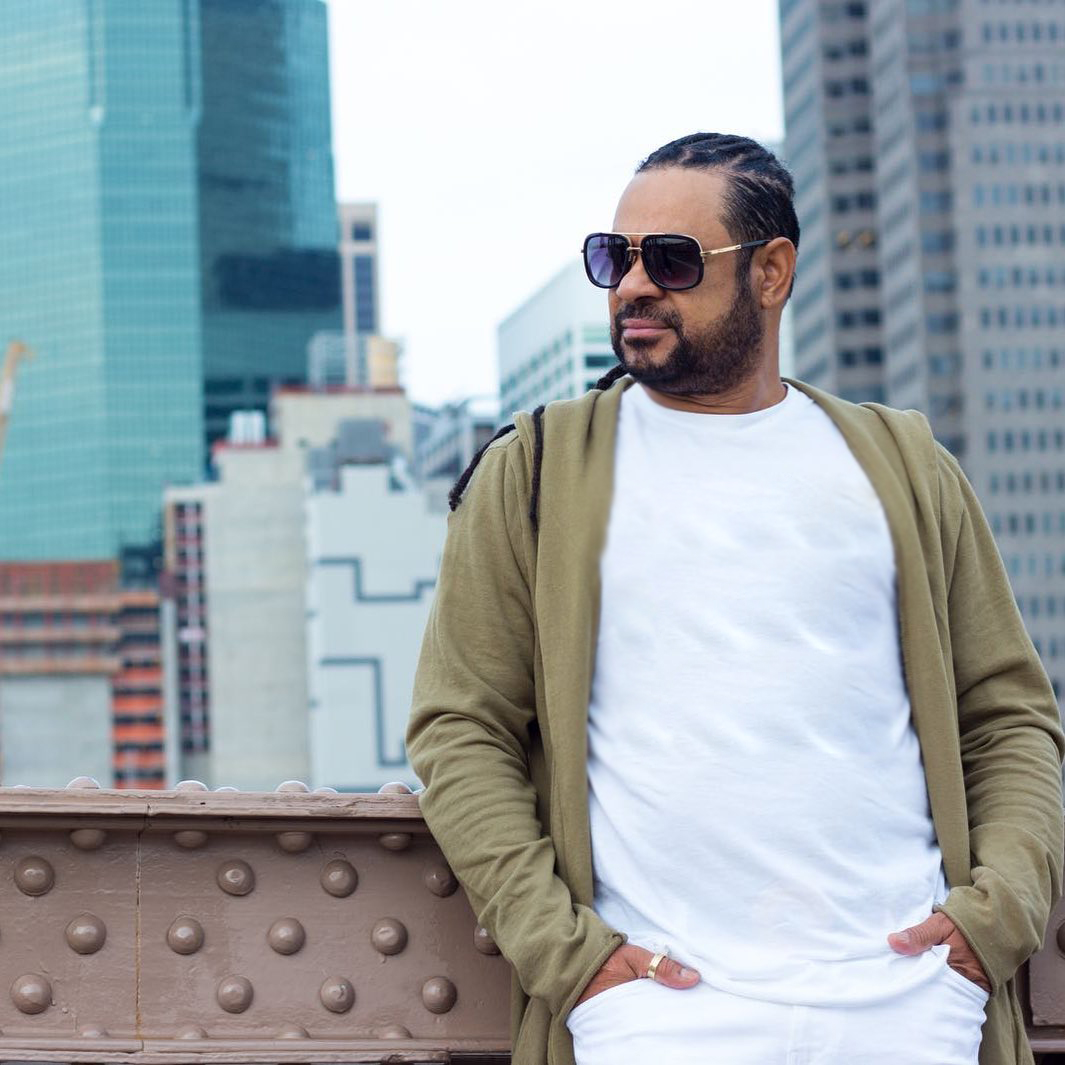
- Vargas in 2019

Background information
- Born: Luis Rafael Valdez Vargas; 23 May 1961 (age 65); Las Matas de Santa Cruz, Dominican Republic
- Genres: Latin; Bachata
- Occupations: Musician; singer
- Instruments: Vocals; guitar
- Years active: 1980–present
- Labels: Jose Luis Records; JVN Music, Inc.; Sony Music Latin

Luis Rafael Valdez Vargas (born 23 May 1961) is a Dominican musician and singer. He became involved in popular music after meeting a local musician who taught him how to play guitar.

== Early life ==
Vargas was born in 1961 in Las Matas de Santa Cruz in the Monte Cristi province. He grew up in a poor household. He became involved in bachata music after meeting a local musician who taught him how to play guitar. He developed his style with influences from Blas Durán and Eladio Romero Santos.

== Career ==
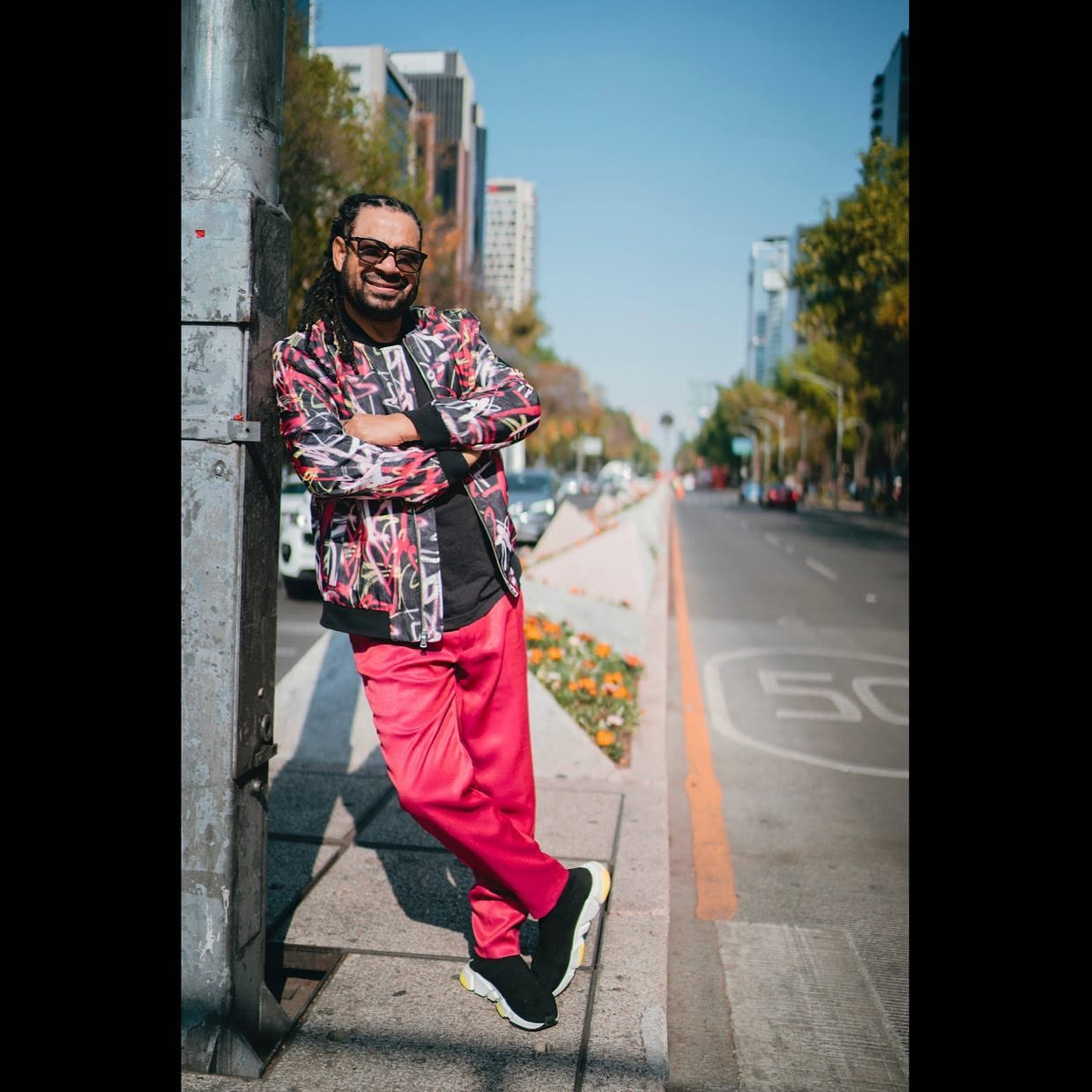
Luis Vargas rey supremo - un verano paseando en ny

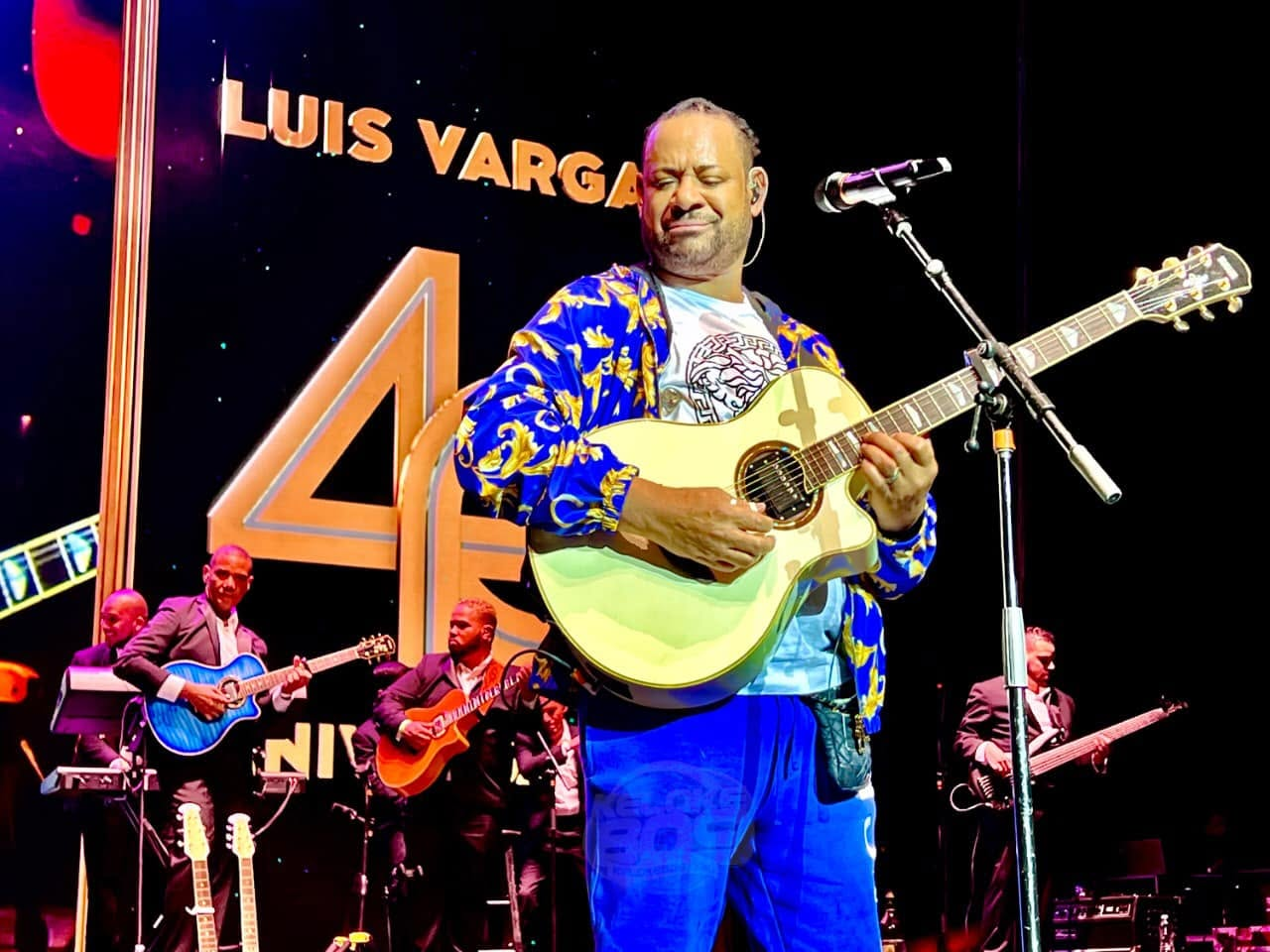
Luis Vargas rey supremo - un verano paseando en ny

Vargas entered onto the bachata scene in the early 1980s. He was one of the first bachata artists to go into the Latin mainstream. Vargas is credited as the first bachatero to use guitar pedals, who he got the idea from bachata sound engineer Rafael Montilla. Montilla added a chorus pedal to Vargas guitar while recording his album El Maiz in 1991. He is also credited as the first bachatero to implement the use of humbucker pickups on acoustic electric guitars. Luis Vargas self-produced, promoted and sold his first albums in the early 1980's. Supported by local artists Pedro Pimentel, Artemio Sánchez, and Antonio Carrasco, his music began being played by local radio stations. After issuing his music through an independent label called José Luis Records, Sony Discos (now Sony Music Latin) signed him in 1996, releasing Volvio el Dolor in 1997. He is the first bachata artist signed to Sony Music Latin. Antony Santos, considered by some to be one of the most influential bachata musicians of all time, was his güira player. Vargas was Santos guitar mentor. After Santos left Vargas group to form his own, they soon became rivals. They even released diss tracks to one another, including "El Envidioso", "El Brazo Largo", "El Gato Seco", "El Charlatan", among others. Vargas became famous for his guitar licks and double entendres. He is known as "El Rey Supremo de la Bachata," ("the supreme king of the bachata") not to be confused with Aventura, "Los Reyes de la Bachata Moderna" ("the kings of modern bachata"). Aventura has credited Luis Vargas as one of the groups inspirations, although they had conflicts with Vargas in the past.

== Discography ==
=== Studio albums ===
- El Debate: Merengues de Verdad (1983)
- El Rey Supremo (1988)
- Sin Hueso (1989)
- El Tomate (1990)
- La Maravilla (1990)
- El Maíz (1991)
- Candela (1992)
- En Serio (1993)
- Loco de Amor (1994)
- Fuera de Serie (1995)
- Rompiendo Corazones (1996)
- Volvió el Dolor (1997)
- Desamor (1999)
- Inocente (2000)
- En Persona (2001)
- Supernatural (2002)
- La Sangre Llama (2003)
- Mensajero (2004)
- Inolvidable (2005)
- Urbano (2007)
- The Legend (2010)
- Los 5 Sentidos (2012)
- Un Beso En Paris (2015)
- La Raíz (2019)
- El Campeón (2023)

=== Live albums ===
- En Vivo: Hablando Crudo (2002)

=== Compilation albums ===
- Super Caliente (1997)
- Disco De Oro (1998)
- Disco De Oro, Vol. 2 (1998)
- Yo Soy Así (2002)
- Luis Vargas: 12 Exitos, Vol. 1 (2003)
- Luis Vargas: 12 Exitos, Vol. 2 (2003)
- Todo Éxitos (2004)
- Éxitos De Luis Vargas (2005)
- UniqueHits (2014)
- 1 (2015)
- Mi Historia Musical (2019)
- 40 Años De Trayectoria "Desde El Principio" Vol. 1 (2022)
- 40 Años De Trayectoria "Lo Que Continuo" Vol. 2 (2022)

=== Collaborative albums ===
- Dobletazo Vol.1 (with Teodoro Reyes) (1995)
- María Díaz y Luis Vargas (with María Díaz) (1997)
- Mano A Mano (with Antony Santos) (2002)
- Grandes de La Bachata: Vol. 4 (2008)
- Quiero Morir Haciendo El Amor (with Mery Peña) (2016)

== Films ==
- En Persona (2001)
- Santo Domingo Blues (The Bachata Story) (2004)
