= The Last Don 2 =

The Last Don II

Studio album by Don Omar
- Released: June 16, 2015
- Recorded: 2013–15
- Genres: Reggaeton; hip hop; Latin pop
- Length: 43:28
- Labels: Pina; Machete
- Producers: Don Omar (exec.); Chris Jeday; Gaby Music; Jumbo; Mambo Kingz; Bryan; Luny Tunes; Tainy; Eliel

Don Omar chronology
MTO²: New Generation (2012)	The Last Don II (2015)	The Last Album (2019)

Singles from The Last Don II
- 1. "Guaya Guaya" Released: October 6, 2014; 2. "Soledad" Released: October 21, 2014; 3. "Perdido En Tus Ojos" Released: April 24, 2015; 4. "Te Recordaré Bailando" Released: June 6, 2015

Professional ratings
Review scores
Source	Rating
AllMusic	4/5 stars

The Last Don II is the sixth studio album by Don Omar, released on June 16, 2015, through Pina Records and Machete Music. It is the sequel of Don Omar's first album, The Last Don, released in 2003, and includes twelve songs and includes the participation of reggaeton stars Wisin & Yandel, Daddy Yankee, Tego Calderón, Plan B, and Natti Natasha. Contrary of Don Omar's latest album, The Last Don II focuses on reggaeton, with exceptions including two hip hop tracks and one latin pop track. It features four singles: "Soledad", "Guaya Guaya", "Perdido En Tus Ojos" and "Te Recordaré Bailando". And songs ''Callejero", "En Lo Oscuro", Olvidar Que Somos Amigos", Dobla Rodilla", "Tirate Al Medio", " Bailando Bajo El Sol", "Sandunga". The songs themes includes dance, sex, love and human self-reflection. It was nominated for a Latin Grammy Award for Best Urban Music Album in the ceremony's 16th edition in 2015.

== Reception ==
The album debuted at the top of the Billboard Top Latin Albums, selling 7,000 units on the first week,

The Last Don 2 was listed among the AllMusic favorite Latin & World Albums in 2015, and was nominated for a Billboard Latin Rhythm Album of the Year and Latin Rhythm Albums Artist of the Year in 2016.

== Background ==
Don Omar about to record Tírate Al Medio, November 2014.

Don Omar's most recent album was the Latin Grammy winner compilation Meet The Orphans 2: New Generation, released in 2012, but his most recent studio album was Meet The Orphans, released in 2010. The Last Don 2 is the sequel of Don Omar's first studio album, The Last Don, released in 2003. In 2014 were released two singles, «Pura Vida» and «Nada Cambiará» featuring Xavi The Destroyer, which were originally part of the track list, but after some time the songs were suppressed of it. The song «Finge Que Me Amas» featuring Tony Dize was released in Tony's album, La Melodía De La Calle: 3rd Season, instead of this one. Between 2014 and 2015 were released the tracks previews, and in 2015 was confirmed the album's track list, suppressing the intro «Il Capo», which uses the chorus of Ray Charles' single «Hit the Road Jack» and was also part of the original production.

== Production ==
The Last Don II was recorded between 2013 and 2015, with "Yo Soy De Aquí" as the first promotional song, which was originally recorded for Don Omar's concert Hecho En Puerto Rico in the José Miguel Agrelot Coliseum. After releasing pop hits including "Danza Kuduro", "Taboo", "Zumba", "Hasta Que Salga El Sol" and "Pura Vida", Don Omar decided to release a 100% reggaeton album for his fans, remembering the music that made him famous. There were 24 songs recorded for this album, including one track featuring Jennifer Lopez and other one with Flo Rida, but Don Omar decided not to include those songs and releasing a 12-songs-long production. It includes also the first collaboration between Wisin & Yandel since their hiatus in 2013.

In an interview with Billboard magazine in 2015, Landrón said that he is planning to release a deluxe edition including the rest of the tracks that weren't released on the original one. He mentioned that there's going to be a tour with Daddy Yankee, and also that he wants to make music videos with him and Wisin & Yandel. In 2014, Don Omar was arrested because of domestic violence, implying that he threatened his girlfriend Rebecca Lopez. He was bailed out but with an electronic shackle, and he finished the album recording at home.

Finally, the album was released worldwide on June 16, 2015, through Pina Records and Machete Music, and reached the top position in the latin ranking of iTunes, as well as the top position on Billboard's Top Latin Albums charts. Don Omar stated that it is a new stage in his musical career and his album success was unexpected for him. As of February 2016 there were no music videos for any of the album's tracks due to problems between Don Omar and his label, Universal Music Latino, whose 10-year-long contract didn't benefit him, who said that he will begin the videos' shooting once his contract ends.

=== Singles ===
- "Guaya Guaya" is the album's first single, released on October 6, 2014. It was written by Don Omar and Jumbo, and was produced by Chris Jeday, Gaby Music, Jumbo and Luny Tunes. It reached the #8 position on Billboard's Latin Digital Songs charts. The single was certified gold by the PROMUSICAE.
- "Soledad" is the second single, released on October 21, 2014. It was written by Don Omar, Raphy Pina, Christopher Montalvo, and Wilmer and Xavier Semper, and was produced by Gaby Music, Mambo Kingz and Bryan. It reached the top position on Billboard's Latin Airplay charts. A salsa version was released in February 2015. The single was nominated for a Lo Nuestro Award for Urban Song of the Year in 2016, and was certified platinum by the PROMUSICAE.
- "Perdido En Tus Ojos" is the third single, released on April 24, 2015. It features latin pop artist Natti Natasha, who worked with Don Omar twice before, in the Latin Grammy winner "Dutty Love" and "Tus Movimientos", both released in 2012. The song was written by Don Omar, Natti Natasha, Chris Jeday and Gaby Music. It reached the #3 position on Billboard's Latin Digital Songs charts. The single was certified platinum by the PROMUSICAE.

Don Omar and Yandel working on "Yo Soy De Aquí", 2013.

- "Te Recordaré Bailando" is the fourth single, released on June 6, 2015, ten days before the album's release. It was written by Don Omar, Jumbo and Christopher Montalvo, and was produced by Gaby Music and Jumbo. Although the single didn't manage to chart in the US, it reached the 36th position in the Spanish charts.

Promotional songs

- "Yo Soy De Aquí" is the album's only promotional song, recorded at Pina Records, and released on April 30, 2013. It features Yandel, Arcángel and Daddy Yankee, being written by all them, Eliel and Raphy Pina, and was produced by Eliel. Tego Calderón was originally featured, but because of problems between him and Daddy Yankee (consequence of Yankee's rivalry with Eddie Dee), he decided not to work in the song. It was recorded because of Don Omar's concert Hecho En Puerto Rico in the José Miguel Agrelot Coliseum in May 2013.

Other charted songs

- "En Lo Oscuro" was released alongside the album, and features Wisin & Yandel, being the fifth collaboration between the three artists. It was written by Don Omar, Wisin & Yandel, Chris Jeday and Gaby Music. It reached the #49 position on Billboard's Latin Digital Songs charts. Don Omar talked about filming the song's music video.
- "Tírate Al Medio" was released alongside the album, and features Daddy Yankee, being the seventh time that they work together. It was written by Don Omar, Daddy Yankee, Chris Jeday and Gaby Music. It reached the #32 position on Billboard's Latin Digital Songs charts. Don Omar talked about filming the song's music video.

== Track listing ==
The album consists in twelve tracks, focusing on reggaeton music, also with two hip hop tracks and a Latin pop track. There are two songs that are mixes between genres: "Soledad" mixes reggaeton and bachata, including guitar and accordion melodies; and "Bailando Bajo El Sol", which musically mixes smooth reggaeton and reggae. Don Omar co-wrote all tracks, and almost all of them has additional writing by a producer. The only track that does not feature the producer's lyrics is "Dobla Rodilla", which was written by Don Omar and Wisin. Chris Jeday and Gaby Music produced almost the entire album, with additional work by Jumbo, Mambo Kingz, Bryan, Luny Tunes, Duran and Tainy. Eliel, who was part of Don Omar's production team in his first two studio albums, produced only one track, "Yo Soy De Aquí", released in April 2013 to promote his concert in the José Miguel Agrelot Coliseum the following month.

No.	Title	Writer(s)	Producer(s)	Length
1.	"Soledad"	William Landrón, Christopher Montalvo, Rafael Pina, Wilmer Semper, Xavier Semper	Gaby Music, Mambo Kingz, Bryan	3:12
2.	"Guaya Guaya"	W. Landrón, Victor Viera	Chris Jeday, Gaby Music, Jumbo, Luny Tunes	3:13
3.	"Perdido En Tus Ojos" (featuring Natti Natasha)	W. Landrón, Natalia Gutiérrez, Carlos Ortíz, Luis Ortíz	Chris Jeday, Gaby Music	3:54
4.	"Callejero" (featuring Tego Calderón)	W. Landrón, Tegui Calderón, C. Ortíz, L. Ortíz	Chris Jeday, Gaby Music	3:53
5.	"En Lo Oscuro" (featuring Wisin & Yandel)	W. Landrón, Juan Morera, Llandel Veguilla, C. Ortíz, L. Ortíz	Chris Jeday, Gaby Music	4:18
6.	"Olvidar Que Somos Amigos" (featuring Plan B)	W. Landrón, Orlando Valle, V. Viera, R. Pina	Chris Jeday, Jumbo, Duran	3:30
7.	"Te Recordaré Bailando"	W. Landrón, V. Viera, C. Montalvo	Gaby Music, Jumbo	3:33
8.	"Dobla Rodilla" (featuring Wisin)	W. Landrón, J. Morera	Gaby Music, Tainy	3:56
9.	"Tírate Al Medio" (featuring Daddy Yankee)	W. Landrón, Ramón Ayala, C. Ortíz, L. Ortíz	Chris Jeday, Gaby Music	3:56
10.	"Bailando Bajo El Sol"	W. Landrón, V. Viera	Jumbo	2:39
11.	"Sandunga" (featuring Tego Calderón)	W. Landrón, T. Calderón, V. Viera	Gaby Music, Jumbo	3:01
12.	"Yo Soy De Aquí" (featuring Yandel, Arcángel, Daddy Yankee)	W. Landrón, L. Veguilla, Austin Santos, R. Ayala, R. Pina, Eliel Lind	Eliel	4:20
Total length:				43:28

== Credits and personnel ==
Most credits adapted from AllMusic.

- William Landrón: Primary Artist – Vocals – Lyrics – Executive Producer
- Rafael Pina: Lyrics – Engineer – Mixing
- Nino Segarra: Engineer – Mixing
- David Duran: Engineer – Mixing
- Juan Rivera: Engineer – Mixing
- Mike Fuller: Mastering
- Carlos Ortíz: Producer – Lyrics
- Luis Ortíz: Producer
- Victor Viera: Producer – Lyrics
- Marco Masis: Producer
- Xavier Semper & Wilmer Semper (Mambo Kingz): Producers – Lyrics
- Bryan: Producer
- Francisco Saldaña & Victor Cabrera (Luny Tunes): Producers
- Christopher Montalvo: Producer – Lyrics
- Eliel Lind: Producer – Lyrics
- Milton Restituyo: Producer
- Ana Alvarado: Production Coordination
- Natalia Gutiérrez: Featured Artist – Vocals – Lyrics
- Tegui Calderón: Featured Artist – Vocals – Lyrics
- Juan Morera: Featured Artist – Vocals – Lyrics
- Llandel Veguilla: Featured Artist – Vocals – Lyrics
- Orlando Valle: Featured Artist – Vocals – Lyrics
- Edwin Vázquez: Featured Artist – Vocals
- Ramón Ayala: Featured Artist – Vocals – Lyrics
- Austin Santos: Featured Artist – Vocals – Lyrics

== Charts ==
=== Weekly charts ===
Chart (2015)	Peak position
Spanish Albums (Spain)(PROMUSICAE)	81
US Billboard 200	73
US Top Latin Albums (Billboard)	1
US Latin Rhythm Albums (Billboard)	1
US Top Rap Albums (Billboard)	6

=== Year-end charts ===
Chart (2015)	Position
US Top Latin Albums (Billboard)	20

=== Charts songs ===
Year	Song	Peak chart positions					
Year	Song	US LATIN	US LATIN TROPICAL	US LATIN RHYTHM	US LATIN DIGITAL	US LATIN POP	SPA
2014	«Guaya Guaya»	29	18	6	8	31	66
2015	«Soledad»	11	8	1	2	7	11
2015	«Perdido En Tus Ojos»	13	—	4	3	7	22
2015	«En Lo Oscuro»	—	—	—	49	—	—
2015	«Tírate Al Medio»	—	—	16	32	39	—
2015	«Te Recordaré Bailando»	—	—	17	—	—	36

== Accolades ==
Year	Nominee / work	Award	Result	Ref.
2015	Don Omar	Latin American Music Awards – Favorite Urban Male Artist	Nominated	
2015	The Last Don 2	Latin Grammy Awards – Best Urban Music Album	Nominated	
2015	The Last Don 2	Billboard – Best Latin Albums of 2015	9th	
2016	The Last Don 2	Lo Nuestro Awards – Urban Album of the Year	Nominated	
2016	«Soledad»	Lo Nuestro Awards – Urban Song of the Year	Nominated	
