= Don Omar Presents MTO²: New Generation =

MTO 2: New Generation

Studio album by Don Omar
- Released: May 1, 2012
- Recorded: 2011–2012
- Genres: Reggaeton; Latin pop
- Length: 47:11
- Labels: Machete; Orfanato

Don Omar chronology
| Meet the Orphans (2010) | MTO 2: New Generation (2012) | The Last Don 2 (2015) |

Singles from Meet the Orphans
- 1. "Dutty Love" Released: March 9, 2012; 2. "Hasta Que Salga el Sol" Released: June 4, 2012; 3. "No Sigue Modas AKA Ella No Sigue Modas" Released: June 22, 2012; 4. "Zumba" Released: October 2, 2012

Meet the Orphans 2: New Generation is the fifth studio album by reggaeton singer Don Omar. It was released on May 1, 2012. It is the sequel to Don Omar's previous album, Meet the Orphans. The previews of three songs were released through YouTube on April 17, 2012. One is called Tus Movimientos featuring Natti Natasha, the second one is called Zumba and the third one is called Dame Una Llamada featuring Syko El Terror. The album debuted at No. 1 on the Billboard Top Latin Albums chart. The album was in the Billboard top 5 in 2012 and the No. 1 spot among Latin artists. The album achieved record history in Billboard. It finished in the top 36 of the decade on Billboard charts, peaked at number 1 on the top Latin albums chart in Billboard, and was the most downloaded album of its genre in 2013. The album was released on August 12, 2012 in Japan.

It is Omar's first album to include the Parental Advisory label. The track Zumba is featured in the video game, Zumba Fitness Core.

The album won two awards at the 13th Annual Latin Grammy Awards: one for Best Urban Music Album and one for Best Urban Song. and was nominated for the Urban Album of the Year at the Lo Nuestro Awards. It won 10 Billboard Latin Music Awards out of 18 nominations in 2013 and was nominated for Latin Rhythm Album of the Year in 2014. The album sold 2,2 million singles worldwide.

== Track listing ==
Standard Edition
| No. | Title | Length |
|---|---|---|
| 1. | "Hasta Que Salga el Sol" | 4:06 |
| 2. | "Zumba" | 4:24 |
| 3. | "Dutty Love" (featuring Natti Natasha) | 4:46 |
| 4. | "Slow Motion" ((featuring Syko)) | 3:11 |
| 5. | "FML (Fuck My Life)" (with Mims featuring Vinny Venditto) | 4:06 |
| 6. | "Ella No Sigue Modas" (with Juan Magan) | 3:52 |
| 7. | "Así Es Que Es" (featuring Syko and Pina Carmirelli) | 3:46 |
| 8. | "Flor De Campo" (by Syko) | 3:24 |
| 9. | "Mi Nena" (by Xavi featuring Zion y Lennox) | 3:46 |
| 10. | "Dame Una Llamada" (featuring Syko) | 3:54 |
| 11. | "La Llave De Mi Corazón" (featuring Yunel Cruz) | 3:56 |
| 12. | "FML (F My Life)" (with Mims featuring Vinny Venditto) | 4:07 |

Bonus Tracks
| No. | Title | Length |
|---|---|---|
| 13. | "Tus Movimientos" (featuring Natti Natasha) | 3:29 |
| 14. | "A Lo Mejor Ya Es Tarde" (featuring Syko) | 3:57 |

Bonus Tracks for international albums: Songs from Meet the Orphans

Mexico Bonus Tracks
| No. | Title | Writer(s) | Producer(s) | Length |
|---|---|---|---|---|
| 13. | "Danza Kuduro" (with Lucenzo) | Landrón, Philippe De Oliveira, Faouze Barkati, Fabrice Toigo | Lucenzo | 3:19 |
| 14. | "Taboo" | Landrón, Gonzalo Hermosa, Ulises Hermosa, Milton Restituyo | A&X | 4:52 |

Japan Bonus Tracks
| No. | Title | Writer(s) | Producer(s) | Length |
|---|---|---|---|---|
| 13. | "Hasta Abajo" | Landrón, Eliel Lind, Everton Bonner, John Taylor, Sly Dunbar, Lloyd Willis | Eliel | 3:52 |
| 14. | "Hooka" (featuring Plan B) | Landrón, Lind, Raphy Pina | Eliel | 3:58 |
| 15. | "Danza Kuduro" (with Lucenzo) | Landrón, Philippe De Oliveira, Faouze Barkati, Fabrice Toigo | Lucenzo | 3:19 |

== Personnel ==
- Composer - Alberto Rodriguez Salgado
- Producer - American King Music
- Composer - Christian Ramos
- Composer - Corey Llewellyn "CL"
- Primary Artist - Don Omar
- Producer - El Predikador
- Composer - Erik Mendelson "Answerman"
- Composer - Felix "Zion" Ortiz
- Composer - Gabriel Enrique Pizarro
- Composer - Jofre Cruz
- Composer - Joshua Paul Randall
- Composer - Juan Abreu
- Primary Artist - Juan Magan
- Composer - Juan Manuel Magan Gonzalez
- Composer - Kelvin Cabral Santiago
- Composer - Lincoln Castaneda
- Composer - Luis Pagan
- Composer - Milton Restituyo
- Primary Artist - Mims
- Featured Artist - Natti Natasha
- Producer - Oreanato Music Group
- Featured Artist - Pina Carmirelli
- Composer - Ray Casillas
- Composer - Robin Mendez
- Composer - Shawn Mims
- Featured Artist, Primary Artist - Syko
- Mastering - Tom Coyne
- Composer - Victor Delgado
- Composer - Victor Viera
- Composer - Victor Viera Hector
- Composer, Featured Artist - Vincent Venditto
- Producer - We Love Asere
- Composer - William Landron Rivera
- Composer - Winston Thomas
- Primary Artist - Xavi
- Composer - Xavier Soto Rivera
- Featured Artist - Yunel Cruz
- Featured Artist - Zion

== Charts ==
=== Weekly charts ===
| Chart (2012) | Peak position |
|---|---|
| Mexican Albums (AMPROFON) | 76 |
| Swiss Albums (Schweizer Hitparade) | 67 |
| US Billboard 200 | 39 |
| US Top Latin Albums (Billboard) | 1 |
| US Latin Rhythm Albums (Billboard) | 1 |
| US Top Rap Albums (Billboard) | 5 |

=== Year-end charts ===
| Chart (2012) | Position |
|---|---|
| US Top Latin Albums (Billboard) | 5 |
| Chart (2013) | Position |
| US Top Latin Albums (Billboard) | 31 |

== See also ==
- List of number-one Billboard Latin Albums from the 2010s
- 2012 in Latin music
