= List of Billboard Latin Rhythm Airplay number ones of 2012 =

The Billboard Latin Rhythm Airplay is a chart that ranks the best-performing Latin rhythm songs in the United States. Published by Billboard magazine, the data are compiled by Nielsen SoundScan based collectively on each single's weekly airplay.

== Chart history ==
Key
†	Indicates number 1 on Billboard's year-end Latin rhythm chart

Issue date	Song	Artist	Ref
January 7	"Lovumba"	Daddy Yankee	
January 14	"Lovumba"	Daddy Yankee	
January 21	"Lovumba"	Daddy Yankee	
January 28	"Lovumba"	Daddy Yankee	
February 4	"Lovumba"	Daddy Yankee	
February 11	"Lovumba"	Daddy Yankee	
February 18	"Lovumba"	Daddy Yankee	
February 25	"Lovumba"	Daddy Yankee	
March 3	"Lovumba"	Daddy Yankee	
March 10	"Lovumba"	Daddy Yankee	
March 17	"Dutty Love"	Don Omar featuring Natti Natasha	
March 24	"Dutty Love"	Don Omar featuring Natti Natasha	
March 31	"Bailando Por El Mundo" †	Juan Magan featuring Pitbull and El Cata	
April 7	"Dutty Love"	Don Omar featuring Natti Natasha	
April 14	"Dutty Love"	Don Omar featuring Natti Natasha	
April 21	"Dutty Love"	Don Omar featuring Natti Natasha	
April 28	"Bailando Por El Mundo" †	Juan Magan featuring Pitbull and El Cata	
May 5	"Bailando Por El Mundo" †	Juan Magan featuring Pitbull and El Cata	
May 12	"Bailando Por El Mundo" †	Juan Magan featuring Pitbull and El Cata	
May 19	"Bailando Por El Mundo" †	Juan Magan featuring Pitbull and El Cata	
May 26	"Bailando Por El Mundo" †	Juan Magan featuring Pitbull and El Cata	
June 2	"Bailando Por El Mundo" †	Juan Magan featuring Pitbull and El Cata	
June 9	"Bailando Por El Mundo" †	Juan Magan featuring Pitbull and El Cata	
June 16	"Bailando Por El Mundo" †	Juan Magan featuring Pitbull and El Cata	
June 23	"Follow the Leader"	Wisin & Yandel and Jennifer Lopez	
June 30	"Follow the Leader"	Wisin & Yandel and Jennifer Lopez	
July 7	"Follow the Leader"	Wisin & Yandel and Jennifer Lopez	
July 14	"Follow the Leader"	Wisin & Yandel and Jennifer Lopez	
July 21	"Hasta Que Salga el Sol"	Don Omar	
July 28	"Hasta Que Salga el Sol"	Don Omar	
August 4	"Hasta Que Salga el Sol"	Don Omar	
August 11	"Hasta Que Salga el Sol"	Don Omar	
August 18	"Hasta Que Salga el Sol"	Don Omar	
August 25	"Pasarela"	Daddy Yankee	
September 1	"Hasta Que Salga el Sol"	Don Omar	
September 8	"Hasta Que Salga el Sol"	Don Omar	
September 15	"Pasarela"	Daddy Yankee	
September 22	"Algo Me Gusta de Ti"	Wisin & Yandel featuring Chris Brown and T-Pain	
September 29	"Algo Me Gusta de Ti"	Wisin & Yandel featuring Chris Brown and T-Pain	
October 6	"Algo Me Gusta de Ti"	Wisin & Yandel featuring Chris Brown and T-Pain	
October 13	"Algo Me Gusta de Ti"	Wisin & Yandel featuring Chris Brown and T-Pain	
October 20	"Algo Me Gusta de Ti"	Wisin & Yandel featuring Chris Brown and T-Pain	
October 27	"Algo Me Gusta de Ti"	Wisin & Yandel featuring Chris Brown and T-Pain	
November 3	"Diosa De Los Corazones"	Arcángel, Zion & Lennox, Lobo, and R.K.M & Ken-Y	
November 10	"Echa Pa'lla (Manos Pa'rriba)"	Pitbull	
November 17	"Algo Me Gusta de Ti"	Wisin & Yandel featuring Chris Brown and T-Pain	
November 24	"Algo Me Gusta de Ti"	Wisin & Yandel featuring Chris Brown and T-Pain	
December 1	"Algo Me Gusta de Ti"	Wisin & Yandel featuring Chris Brown and T-Pain	
December 8	"Echa Pa'lla (Manos Pa'rriba)"	Pitbull	
December 15	"Algo Me Gusta de Ti"	Wisin & Yandel featuring Chris Brown and T-Pain	
December 22	"Algo Me Gusta de Ti"	Wisin & Yandel featuring Chris Brown and T-Pain	
December 29	"Amor Real"	Gocho featuring Yandel and Wayne Wonder	
