= Bandolero =

A bandolero was a Spanish robber. Bandolero may also refer to:

== Film ==
- The Bandolero, lost 1924 film
- Bandolero!, a 1968 movie starring James Stewart
- Los Bandoleros (film), 2009 short film

== Music ==
- Bandolero (band), a French band formed by Jill Merme-Bourezak and, Carlos and José Perez, best known for the 1983 European hit "Paris Latino"
- Los Bandoleros (album), by Don Omar (2005)
- "Bandolero" (song), a 1996 song by Paradisio
- "Bandolero", 2005 song by Olga Tañón
- "Bandoleros" (song), by Don Omar
- "Bandolero", 1991 song by Pinchers

== Other ==
- Bandoleros, cars in Bandolero racing, an entry-level racing formula in the United States
- Bandolero (animated series)

== See also ==
- Bandolier, a pocketed belt for holding ammunition
