= Emigrante del Mundo =

Studio album by Lucenzo
- Released: 30 September 2011
- Recorded: 2011
- Genre: Reggaeton, Latin, pop, kuduro
- Length: 43:55
- Label: Yanis, B1M1
- Producer: Lucenzo

Singles from Emigrante del Mundo
- 1. "Vem Dançar Kuduro" Released: 12 April 2010; 2. "Emigrante del Mundo" Released: 5 July 2010; 3. "Baila Morena" Released: 15 November 2010

Emigrante del Mundo is the debut studio album by Portuguese–French reggaeton recording artist Lucenzo, released on 30 September 2011 through Yanis Records and licensed to B1M1 Recordings.

== Track listing ==
No.	Title	Writer(s)	Producer(s)	Length
1.	"Danza Kuduro" (with Don Omar)	Luís Filipe Oliveira, William Landrón, Faouze Barkati, Fabrice Toigo	Lucenzo	3:31
2.	"Tengo El Flow"			3:21
3.	"Emigrante del Mundo"	Lucenzo	Lucenzo	3:25
4.	"Vem Dançar Kuduro" (featuring Big Ali)	Oliveira, Alexander Scander, Cyril Govic	Lucenzo	3:17
5.	"Dame Reggaeton"			3:28
6.	"Dembow"			3:14
7.	"Quiero Vivir" (featuring Chico & The Gypsies)			3:27
8.	"Make It Hot"			3:10
9.	"Baila Morena"	Oliveira, Scander, Covic	Lucenzo	3:00
10.	"Dame Un Beso (Me Vuelves Loco)"			3:14
11.	"Mami Te Quiero"			4:01
12.	"Jump" (featuring Vince McClenny)			3:14
13.	"Danza Kuduro (Throw Your Hands Up)" (with Qwote featuring Pitbull)			3:30

== Chart performance ==
Based on the successes of The album "Danza Kuduro" and the title song "Emigrante del Mundo", the album proved successful in France reaching #8 in the SNEP official French Singles Chart.

Chart (2011–2012)	Peak position
Austria (Ö3 Austria Top 75)	60
SNEP (French Albums Chart)	8
Portugal (Portuguese Albums Chart)	24
Switzerland (Swiss Albums Chart)	15
