= Hasta Abajo =

Hasta Abajo may refer to:

- "Hasta Abajo" (Don Omar song), 2009
- "Hasta Abajo" (Yandel song), 2013
- "Hasta Abajo", a song by Kevin Roldán, 2020
