= Baila morena (Lucenzo song) =

"Baila Morena"

Single by Lucenzo

from the album Emigrante del Mundo
- Released: 13 December 2010
- Recorded: 2010
- Label: Yanis Records; Universal
- Songwriter(s): Faouzi Barkati, Fabrice Cyril Toigo and Lucenzo
- Producer(s): Lucenzo

Lucenzo singles chronology
"Danza Kuduro" (2010)	"Baila Morena" (2010)	"Wine It Up" (2012)

"Baila Morena" is a Portuguese-language song performed by Lucenzo. Written by Alexander Scander, Cyril Covic and Lucenzo himself, it is a follow-up release to "Vem Dançar Kuduro" and "Danza Kuduro" from his album Emigrante del Mundo.

== Music video ==
The music video was directed by Vincent Egret. It shows Lucenzo following various love interests in his car in a desert, while repairing his car in a garage or while being served at a restaurant. The final scene shows DJ Coms playing some tunes promoting Lucenzo, and the music video ends with the announcement "to be continued", it is a worldwide success.

== Charts ==
The song has been success in France reaching #9 in the SNEP French Singles Chart charts, staying for 37 weeks in the French Charts.

=== Weekly charts ===
Chart (2010–2012)	Peak position
France (SNEP)	9

=== Year-end charts ===
Chart (2011)	Position
France (SNEP)	63
Chart (2012)	Position
France (SNEP)	166
