= Vem Dançar Kuduro =

2010 song by Lucenzo

Single by Lucenzo featuring Big Ali

from the album Emigrante del Mundo
- Released: January 2010
- Recorded: 2010
- Genre: Dance; kuduro
- Length: 3:19
- Label: Yanis Records; Universal Music
- Songwriters: Faouzi Barkati; Lucenzo; Ali Fitzgerald Moore; Fabrice Cyril Toigo
- Producer: Lucenzo

Lucenzo singles chronology
"Emigrante del Mundo" (2007)	"Vem Dançar Kuduro" (2010)	"Danza Kuduro" (2010)

Big Ali singles chronology
"Universal Party" (2009)	"Vem Dançar Kuduro" (2010)

Music video
- "Vem Dançar Kuduro" on YouTube

"Vem Dançar Kuduro" (pronounced [ˈvɐ̃j dɐ̃ˈsaɾ kuˈðuɾu]; English: "Come Dance Kuduro") is a multilingual Portuguese/English/Spanish dance hit single by Lucenzo, a France-based artist of Portuguese origin featuring France-based American artist Big Ali. Lucenzo sings in Portuguese and Big Ali in English and Spanish.

"Vem Dançar Kuduro" (kuduro being an Angolan type of music) enjoyed much success in France, with the single "Vem Dançar Kuduro" reaching number 2 in the SNEP French Top 100 charts (based solely on actual sales of singles) and number 1 on the French Club 40 charts (based on actual plays in 80 discos in France). "Vem Dançar Kuduro" was also a hit in Denmark, Finland, Netherlands, Norway, Sweden and Switzerland. Many popular remix versions of the song have been made since.

Following the success of the song, Lucenzo released a Spanish-language single "Danza Kuduro" with the reggaeton Puerto Rican singer Don Omar that samples on a large part on "Vem Dançar Kuduro", but is a distinct song. At times, both versions have appeared separately on the same chart in certain European countries. These include Belgium, Canada, Denmark, Finland, France, Germany, Norway, Sweden and Switzerland where both songs were hits.

== Track list ==
1. Vem Dançar Kuduro (radio edit) (3:21)
2. Vem Dançar Kuduro (Lucenzo solo) (2:48)
3. Vem Dançar Kuduro (club extended)

== Music video ==
The music video was shot in Havana, Cuba portraying Lucenzo and Big Ali promoting their concert that is to be held in a poor neighborhood in the Cuban capital, while Lucenzo is distributing posters to the public and Big Ali is joining in declaring, through loud speakers, about music coming from New York City, Angola and Portugal alluding to kuduro music to be played at the party. Some fans are joining in the celebrations dancing in the streets with the artists.

In other scenes, Lucenzo and Big Ali are seen preparing for the concert having haircuts at a barber shop.

== Chart performance ==
Chart (2010–11)	Peak position
Belgium (Ultratip Bubbling Under Wallonia)	5
Canada (Canadian Hot 100)	84
Denmark (Tracklisten)	14
Finland (Finland's Official List)	12
France (SNEP)	2
Norway (VG-lista)	15
Sweden (Sverigetopplistan)	1
Switzerland (Media Control AG)	31

== Certifications ==
Region	Certification	Certified units/sales
Denmark (IFPI Danmark)	Gold	45,000^{‡}
Italy (FIMI)	Gold	50,000^{‡}
Spain (Promusicae)	Gold	30,000^{‡}
United Kingdom (BPI)	Silver	200,000^{‡}
^{‡} Sales+streaming figures based on certification alone.

== Versions involving Lucenzo ==
Title	Credits	Album
"Vem Dançar Kuduro"	Lucenzo featuring Big Ali	Emigrante del Mundo
"Danza Kuduro"	Don Omar featuring Lucenzo	Don Omar Presents: Meet the Orphans
"Vem Dançar Kuduro" / "Danza Kuduro"	Lucenzo featuring Big Ali / Lucenzo featuring Don Omar	
"Danza Kuduro (Throw Your Hands Up)"	Lucenzo & Qwote featuring Pitbull & Don Omar	
"Danza Kuduro (Throw Your Hands Up)"	Lucenzo & Qwote featuring Pitbull	
"Throw Your Hands Up (Dançar Kuduro)"	Qwote featuring Pitbull & Lucenzo	
"Danza Kuduro 2012"	Akon featuring Lucenzo	

== Vem Dançar Kuduro / Danza Kuduro ==
"Vem Dançar Kuduro / Danza Kuduro"

Single by Lucenzo featuring Big Ali / Don Omar

from the album Emigrante del Mundo
- Released: July 8, 2011
- Genre: Kuduro; dance
- Length: 3:15
- Songwriters: Faouzi Barkati; Lucenzo; Ali Fitzgerald Moore; Fabrice Cyril Toigo

This was a special double A side release in the Netherlands that included Lucenzo as main singer and featuring Big Ali as in the original release regarding side A (Vem Dançar Kuduro) and Don Omar regarding side B (Danza Kuduro).

Another difference for the Dutch release was that "Danza Kuduro" was credited directly to Lucenzo featuring Don Omar, whereas in all other markets, the song had been credited as "Don Omar featuring Lucenzo".

This double A side release topped the Dutch Top 40 charts.

CD Maxi:

- Danza Kuduro – Lucenzo feat. Don Omar (3:20)
- Vem dançar kuduro (Radio Edit) – Lucenzo feat. Big Ali (3:16)

Charts

Chart (2011)	Peak position
Dutch Top 40	1
Dutch Single Top 100	1

== Throw Your Hands Up (Dançar Kuduro) ==
"Throw Your Hands Up (Dançar Kuduro)"

Single by Qwote featuring Pitbull and Lucenzo
- Released: November 8, 2011
- Genre: Kuduro; dance
- Length: 3:38
- Label: Dance Nation
- Songwriters: Faouzi Barkati; Lucenzo; Armando C. Pérez; Ali Fitzgerald Moore; Fabrice Cyril Toigo

Qwote singles chronology
"Don't Wanna Fight" (2009)	"Throw Your Hands Up (Dançar Kuduro)" (2011)	"Letting Go (Cry Just A Little)" (2012)

Lucenzo singles chronology
Baila Morena (2010)	Throw Your Hands Up (Dancar Kuduro) (2011)	Wine It Up (2012)

Music video
- "Throw Your Hands Up (Dancar Kuduro)" on YouTube

"Throw Your Hands Up (Dançar Kuduro)" is a rearranged multilingual recording of the song by Qwote featuring Pitbull and Lucenzo in English, Spanish and Portuguese. It entered the UK Singles Chart at No. 13 on the chart dated 6 November 2011. It also charted on the Scottish Singles Chart, peaking at No. 11, and also charted in Ireland and Australia.

=== Chart performance ===
Chart (2011–2012)	Peak position
Ireland (IRMA)	31
New Zealand (Recorded Music NZ)	29
Poland Dance (ZPAV)	16
Scottish Singles Sales (Official Charts)	11
UK Dance (Official Charts)	4
UK Indie (Official Charts)	3
UK Singles (Official Charts)	13

=== Year-end charts ===
Chart (2011)	Position
UK Singles (Official Charts Company)	200
Chart (2012)	Position
Australia (ARIA)	36

BPI certified silver

=== Track list ===
iTunes EP
No.	Title	Length
1.	"Danza Kuduro" (radio edit, featuring Don Omar)	2:24
2.	"Danza Kuduro" (featuring Big Ali)	3:16
3.	"Throw Your Hands Up (Dançar Kuduro)" (UK edit, featuring Pitbull)	2:31
4.	"Throw Your Hands Up (Dançar Kuduro)" (Wideboys remix, featuring Pitbull)	5:56
5.	"Throw Your Hands Up (Dançar Kuduro)" (UK extended mix, featuring Pitbull)	4:14
6.	"Throw Your Hands Up (Dançar Kuduro)" (featuring Don Omar, Daddy Yankee and Arcángel)	3:33

=== Other versions ===
Qwote has released a number of other versions over and above the ones on the maxi-single as follows:

- "Throw Your Hands Up (Dançar Kuduro)" – Lucenzo & Qwote (featuring Pitbull & Don Omar)
- "Throw Your Hands Up (Dançar Kuduro)" – Lucenzo vs Qwote (featuring Pitbull )
- "Throw Your Hands Up" – Qwote (featuring Pitbull)
- "Throw Your Hands Up" – Qwote (featuring Pitbull & T-Vice)
- "Throw Your Hands Up (Dançar Kuduro)" Remixed – Qwote (featuring Pitbull & Lucenzo)
- "Throw Your Hands Up (Dançar Kuduro)" – Qwote (featuring Pitbull)

== Danza Kuduro (Throw Your Hands Up) ==
"Danza Kuduro (Throw Your Hands Up)"

Single by Lucenzo and Qwote featuring Pitbull and Don Omar
- Released: October 30, 2011
- Genre: Kuduro; dance
- Length: 5:15
- Songwriters: Faouzi Barkati; Lucenzo; Armando C. Pérez; Ali Fitzgerald Moore; Fabrice Cyril Toigo

"Danza Kuduro (Throw Your Hands Up)" is a rearranged multilingual recording of the song by Lucenzo and Qwote featuring Pitbull and Don Omar in English, Spanish and with a refrain by Lucenzo in Portuguese.

== Other versions and samplings ==
In 2011, Brazilian singer Latino made a full Portuguese version of the song.

This song was also covered by Brazilian artists Robson Moura and Lino Krizz as "Vem Dançar com Tudo", as the opening for the telenovela Avenida Brasil.

Dr. Bellido sampled part of the music in his hit "Señorita" that features also the vocals of Papa Joe.

In January 2024, it was adapted into "YOI", a Thai version by Boom Boom Cash, Thai EDM band. Its title is a slang for the word "yummy" in Thai.

=== Other remixes ===
- Official Remix (featuring Lucenzo, Daddy Yankee & Arcangel)
- Worldwide Remix (featuring Lucenzo, Pitbull & El Cata)
- Dançar Coturo by Lika (featuring Lucenzo & Don Omar)
- Remix (featuring Lucenzo & Shakira)
- Remix (featuring Lucenzo & Erick Right)
- Raaban Remix
- Miami Power96 remix (Lucenzo, Pitbull, DJ Laz)
- Remix (featuring Lucenzo & Omari Ferrai)
- Throw Your Hands Up (Lucenzo & Qwote featuring Pitbull) - See below
- English remix (featuring Lucenzo & Dabbs)
- Merengue remix (featuring Lucenzo & El Cata)
- Remix (Lucenzo & Don Miguelo)
- Miki Hernandez Remix
- Mammat Riivaa (Ruudolf & Karri Koira)
- Danza Kuduro (Sexy Ladies) - Don Omar and Akon
- Danza Rabiosa Kuduro - DJ Ryxen Remix (featuring Lucenzo, Shakira, Pitbull, Marc Anthony & The Swedish House Maffia)
- "Viata e dura (Imnul repetentului la Bac)" - comedian version by Romanian singers
- "My Edem v Leto" - Russian version by Muradiks feat. Bahtiyar

All Stars Remix (Lucenzo, Big Ali, Don Omar, Arcangel, Daddy Yankee, Qwote, El Cata, Pitbull, J Balvin, Justin Quiles, Erick Right, Omari Ferrari, FloRida, Akon, Nicki Minaj, Justin Bieber, Sean Paul, El Símbolo, Gusttavo Lima, Fatman Scoop, David Guetta, Shorty One, Wisin y Yandel, Cali y Dandee, Magic System, Chawki, Khaled, Shakira)
