= Líderes =

Studio album by Wisin & Yandel
- Released: July 3, 2012
- Recorded: 2011 – 2012
- Genre: Reggaeton; Dance pop; R&B, House
- Length: 62:58
- Label: Machete, WY
- Producer: Wisin & Yandel (also executive); Luis O'Neill, Marcos "Tainy" Masis, Chris Jeday, Jonas Saeed, Pontus Söderqvist, Niclas Kings, Sermstyle, Luis Montes, Luis F. Cortes, DJ Urba

Wisin & Yandel chronology
Los Vaqueros: El Regreso (2011)	Líderes (2012)	Los Campeones del Pueblo: The Big Leagues (2018)

Singles from Líderes
- 1. "Vengo Acabando (only radio)" Released: June 6, 2011; 2. "Follow the Leader" Released: April 10, 2012; 3. "Peligro (only radio)" Released: June 9, 2012; 4. "Prende (only radio)" Released: June 29, 2012; 5. "Algo Me Gusta de Ti" Released: August 17, 2012; 6. "Hipnotizame (Remix)" Released: December 8, 2012

Líderes (English: Leaders) is the eighth studio album by Puerto Rican reggaeton duo Wisin & Yandel. launched on the market on July 3, 2012, through from WY Records and Machete Music. The album features collaborations of artist like Chris Brown, T-Pain, Jennifer Lopez, O’Neill, Franco "El Gorila" and Alberto Stylee, Timbaland. The album's track listing was confirmed by Universal on June 11, 2012. The album is a mixture of Latin pop, dance-pop, hip-hop, and reggaeton, and won the Lo Nuestro Award for Urban Album of the Year. It also the Billboard Latin Music Award for Latin Rhythm Album of the Year in 2013.

== Reception ==
Professional ratings
Review scores
Source	Rating
About.com	4/5 stars
Allmusic	3.5/5 stars

Carlos Quintana from About.com said that Líderes "represents a good example of what we can consider a modern Latin Urban music album. This production offers a good balance between the original flavors of Reggaeton and a sound shaped by defined Dance beats that can be heard throughout the whole album -- Overall, Líderes is an album that offers a good mix of a little bit of Reggaeton, Dance music and Latin Pop. Considering this mix is what is making Latin Urban music so popular today, Líderes does a good job in delivering just what the people want." Although Billboard estimated the album will sell between 10 thousand and 15 thousand copies in the first week in the US, it only sold 3,427 copies.

== Promotion ==
=== Singles ===
- "Follow the Leader" was released as the lead single from the album on April 20, 2012. The song features American singer Jennifer Lopez. The song's music video was shot in Acapulco, Mexico and performed first time during the American Idol season eleven finale. The song also peaked at the top on the Billboard Latin Songs.
- "Algo Me Gusta de Ti / Something About You" was released as the second single on July 24, 2012. The song features American singer Chris Brown & rapper T-Pain. There is also an unofficial released remix from 3D M4n. An English version of the song, titled "Something About You", was also released as a separate single.
- "A remix of the song "Hipnotizame" featuring Daddy Yankee was released as the third single from the album on December 8, 2012.

=== Other songs ===
- "Música Buena" was originally performed by Franco "El Gorila" and Yandel, included on 2011 Franco's album La Verdadera Maquina titled "Mi Música Buena". The song was re-recorded and included on Líderes, replacing Franco's vocals by Wisin's vocals and titled only "Música Buena".
- "Vengo Acabando" was also recorded and leaked on June 4, 2011, it was released as a remix and they were guest artists on the track, but it was never officially promoted.

== Track listing ==
Standard edition

No.	Title	Writer(s)	Producer(s)	Length
1.	"Tu Nombre"	Juan Luis Morera, Llandel Veguilla, Marcos "Tainy" Masis, Luis O'Neill	O'Neill, "Tainy", Chris Jedai	4:31
2.	"Hipnotízame"	Morera, Veguilla, Masis, O'Neill	O'Neill, Tainy	4:03
3.	"Algo Me Gusta de Ti" (featuring Chris Brown & T-Pain)	Morera, Veguilla, O'Neill, Chris Jedai	O'Neill, Jedai	4:35
4.	"Peligro"	Morera, Veguilla, Masis, O'Neill	O'Neill, "Tainy"	3:29
5.	"No Te Detengas"	Morera, Veguilla, Jonas Saeed, Pontus Söderqvist	Saeed, Söderqvist	3:45
6.	"Follow the Leader" (with Jennifer Lopez)	Morera, Veguilla, Saeed, Jennifer Lopez, Tasha Gayle, Niclas Kings, Nailah Thorbourne, Nyanda Thorbourne, Candace Thorbourne	Saeed, Kings	4:00
7.	"Una Bendición (Spotlight)"	Morera, Veguilla, Tony Girakhoo, Henry L. Hill, Ahmad H. Russell, Jamie Sanderson	Sermstyle	4:13
8.	"Rumba"	Morera, Veguilla, Jeday, O'Neill, Luis Montes	O'Neill, Jedai, Montes	3:32
9.	"Prende" (featuring Franco "El Gorila" & O’Neill)	Morera, Veguilla, Jedai, O'Neill	O'Neill, Jedai, Luis F. Cortes	5:02
10.	"Perdón" (featuring O’Neill - Uncredited)	Morera, Veguilla, Jedai	Jedai	4:53
11.	"Música Buena"	Morera, Veguilla, DJ Urba	DJ Urba, Rome La Mano Negra	4:24
12.	"Noche De Carnaval"	Morera, Veguilla, Jedai, O'Neill	O'Neill, Jedai	3:28
13.	"Un Beso"	Morera, Veguilla, Jedai, O'Neill	O'Neill, Jedai	4:38
14.	"Algo Me Gusta De Ti" (Alternate version)	Morera, Veguilla, Jedai, O'Neill	O'Neill, Jedai	4:36
15.	"Vengo Acabando" (featuring Franco "El Gorila" & Alberto Stylee)	Morera, Veguilla, Masis, F. Cortes, Nelson Díaz, Annie Lennox, David A. Stewart, Alberto Stylee	"Tainy"	3:51
Total length:				63:14

== Charts ==
=== Weekly charts ===
Chart (2012)	Peak position
Mexican Albums (AMPROFON)	4
Mexican International Albums (AMPROFON)	2
US Billboard 200	42
US Top Latin Albums (Billboard)	1
US Latin Rhythm Albums (Billboard)	1
US Top Rap Albums (Billboard)	6

=== Year-end charts ===
Chart (2012)	Position
US Top Latin Albums (Billboard)	10
Chart (2013)	Position
US Top Latin Albums (Billboard)	26
