= All Star Records =

Puerto Rican singer Don Omar's record label

- Parent company: Universal Music Group
- Founded: 2004
- Founder: Don Omar
- Distributor: Machete Music
- Genre: Reggaeton
- Country of origin: Puerto Rico

All Star Records Now Orfanato Music Group is Don Omar's record label. He released the album Los Bandoleros under this label in 2005. Omar is the label's biggest attraction. It operates as a subsidiary of, and is distributed through, Universal Music Group's Machete Records.

== History ==
After the debut of the album The Last Don, Don Omar was granted his own label. Since 2004, his label became successful for not only himself, but his appointed label artists.

== Associations ==
=== Artists ===
- Don Omar
- Rell w/ Orfanato Music Group
- Glory
- Marcy Place w/ Orfanato Music Group
- Cynthia Antigua w/ Orfanato Music Group
- Chino & Nacho w/Orfanato Music Group
- Farruko w/ Orfanato Music Group
- Kendo Kaponi w/ Orfanato Music Group

=== Producers ===
- Danny Fornaris
- Lex
- Robbin
- A&X
- Link On

== Albums ==
The following albums were released under Orfanato Music Group.

- Don Omar: Los Bandoleros
- Don Omar: King of Kings
- All Star Records Presenta: Linaje Escogido
- Don Omar: Los Bandoleros Reloaded
- Don Omar: King of Kings: Armageddon Edition
- All Star Records Presenta: Don Omar - All Star Hits
- Marcy Place: B From Marcy Place

== See also ==
- List of record labels
- Machete Music
