= Carlos Pérez (director) =

Puerto Rican film director

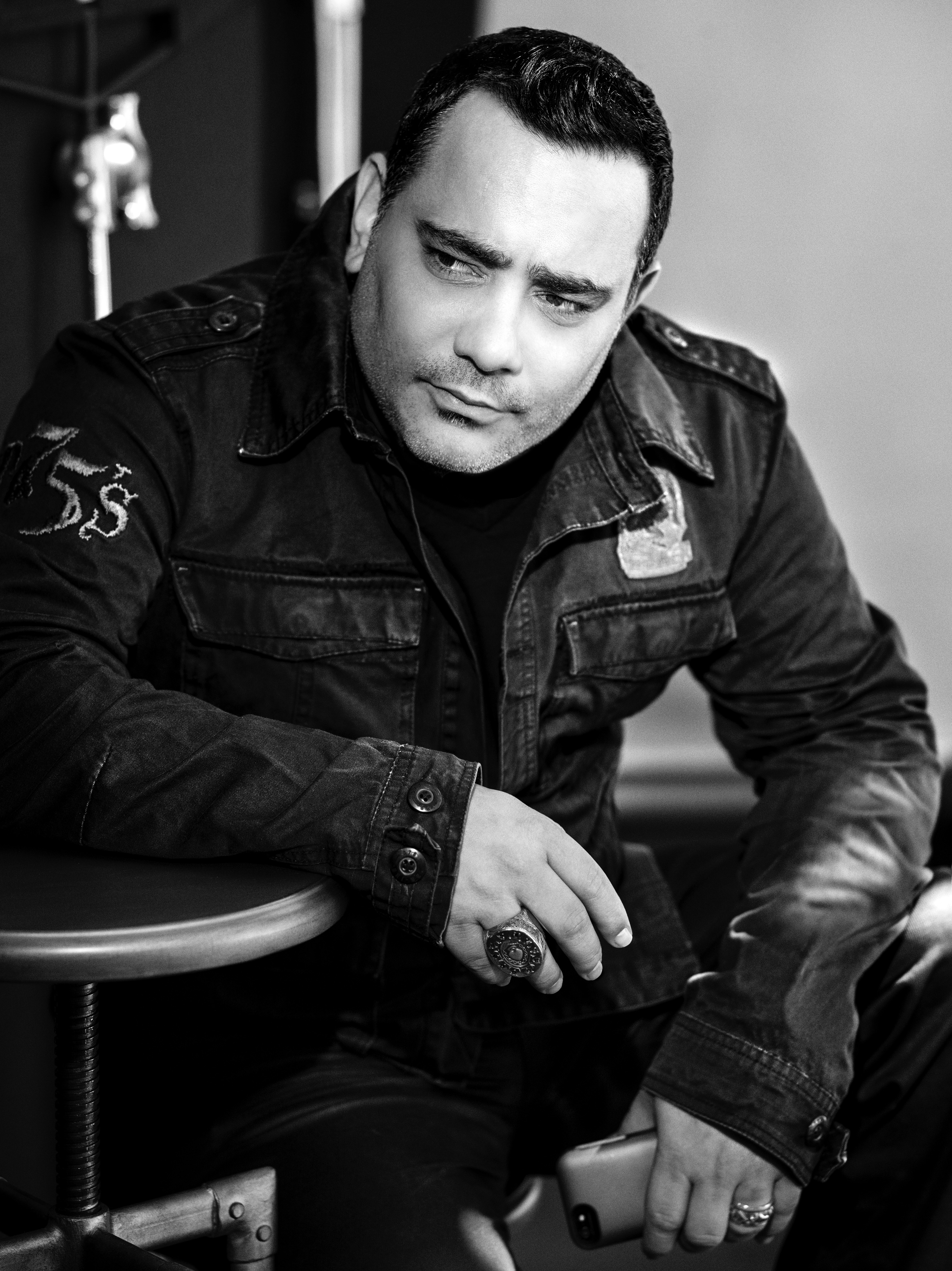
- Occupations: Film director, music video director, graphic designer, business executive
- Years active: 2000–present
- Known for: Five-time Latin Grammy Award nominee and two-time winner for the music videos “Despacito” (Luis Fonsi and Daddy Yankee) and “Amor Eterno” (Marc Anthony)
- Website: www.carlosperez.com

Carlos Pérez is a Puerto Rican film director, music video director, graphic designer, and the Creative Director/founder of the creative studio Elastic People. He is a five-time Latin Grammy Award nominee and a two-time winner for his music videos “Despacito” (Luis Fonsi and Daddy Yankee) and “Amor Eterno” (Marc Anthony).

== Career ==
In the beginning of his career, Pérez worked for a firm that specialized in automotive design, where he worked as a Senior designer for brands such as Mercedes-Benz and Porsche. Pérez was also appointed creative director of the graphic design firm Pinkhaus in 2000 before eventually founding Elastic People in 2002. At Elastic People, Pérez engaged in designing album covers and directing music videos for artists such as Daddy Yankee, Don Omar, Ricky Martin, and Maná.

In 2004, Pérez served as the Creative Director for Daddy Yankee’s "Barrio Fino" album, designing its cover and directing the music video for the lead track, "Gasolina," which received an MTV2 Award nomination at the 2005 MTV Video Music Awards. The music video also received a nomination in the MTV VMA’s Japan in the “Best Reggae Music Video“ category.

In 2005, Pérez directed his first documentary, Barrio Fino En Directo, a concert film and documentary of the making of Daddy Yankee’s album of the same name. It was featured in Billboard Magazine.

Two Elastic People projects designed by Carlos were featured in La Bienal Iberoamericana del Diseño in Madrid Spain in 2008, namely the packaging for the Tego Calderon album, The Underdog, along with a brochure about Guatemala designed to promote a Travel Channel documentary.

In 2009, Pérez also directed the Latin Grammy-nominated documentary Free Tempo: Victory, which documented the collaboration between The London Symphony Orchestra and federal inmate Latin Hip Hop artist David Sanchez Badillo, also known as Tempo. This work earned him a Latin Grammy nomination in the Best Long-Form video category.

In 2010, Pérez directed the first stereoscopic 3D music video in Spanish for Daddy Yankee’s song, “Descontrol.” In the same year, Pérez directed the music video for Daddy Yankee’s “Grito Mundia.”

In 2011, Pérez received a Latin Grammy nomination for directing the music video for Ricky Martin’s “Lo Mejor de mi Vida Eres Tu.”

Pérez directed Daddy Yankee’s “Pasarela” music video in 2012.

The following year, Pérez directed Ricky Martin’s “Come With Me” music video. Pérez also directed Draco Rosa and Ricky Martin’s “Mas y Mas” music video.

In 2015, he directed a music video for a bilingual song featuring Will Smith on the remix of “Fiesta” by Bomba Estéreo.

In 2016, Pérez directed Ricky Martin’s “Perdoname” music video.

In 2017, Pérez also directed the music video for "Despacito," by Luis Fonsi and Daddy Yankee, which broke five Guinness World Records and became the most-viewed music video in YouTube's history, earning a spot in Billboard's list of the "100 Greatest Music Videos of the 21st Century." Also in 2017, Pérez directed the music videos for Luis Fonsi and Demi Lovato’s “Échame La Culpa” and Daddy Yankee’s “Dura,” which hit the #1 spot on YouTube’s Music Video Global Chart.

In 2018, he directed another bilingual video "Está Rico" with Marc Anthony, Will Smith and Bad Bunny.In the same year, he directed the music videos for Daddy Yankee’s “Dura” and Ricky Martin’s “Fiebre.”

In 2019, Apple commissioned Carlos to design covers for Latin music playlists on Apple Music. He oversaw the creative direction and design of the album cover of Romeo Santos' Formula Vol.2, which was named Billboard's Album of the Decade from 2010 to 2020.

In 2022, Pérez directed Ricky Martin’s “Acido Sabor” music video and Don Omar’s “Let’s Get Crazy” music video.

In 2023, Pérez directed Ricky Martin’s “Fuego de Noche, Nieve de Dia” music video feat. Christian Nodal. In the same year, Pérez directed Don Omar’s “Sandunga” music video feat. Wisin & Yandel.

In 2024, Pérez collaborated extensively with Mexican singer Christian Nodal on music videos.He also directed Luis Fonsi’s “Roma” music video feat. Laura Pausini and Ricky Martin’s “A Medio Vivir” music video feat. Carín León.

He has also collaborated with artists like Bad Bunny, Ricky Martin, Don Omar, Draco Rosa, Bomba Estéreo, Laura Pausin, Demi Lovato, Ricardo Arjona, Sebastián Yatra, Maluma and many others.

== Filmography ==
=== Music Videos ===
Year	Artist	Title	Awards
2025	Ricky Martin, Carin Leon	A Medio Vivir	
2025	Laura Pausini, Yami Safdie	Eso y Mas	
2024	Christian Nodal	La Corazonada	
2024	Marc Anthony	Ale Ale	Latin Grammy Nominee “Best Short Form Music Video”
2024	Christian Nodal	Kbron y Medio	
2024	Christian Nodal	Bandolebrios	
2024	Christian Nodal	No Me 100to Bien	Telly Awards - Gold Award - Music Video
2024	Luis Fonsi + Laura Pausini	Roma	
2024	Marc Anthony	Punta Cana	
2024	Luis Fonsi	Santiago	
2023	Ricky Martin + Christian Nodal	Fuego de Noche, Nieve de Dia	
2023	Marc Anthony + Pepe Aguilar	Ojala Te Duela	
2023	Luis Fonsi	Buenos Aires	Berlin Music Video Awards Nominee “Best Art Direction”
2023	Don Omar + Wisin + Yandel	Sandunga	
2022	Ricky Martin	Acido Sabor	Buenos Aires Music Video Awards Nominee “Video Favorito”
2022	Luis Fonsi	Dolce	
2022	Don Omar	Let’s Get Crazy	Buenos Aires Music Video Awards Nominee “Best Choreography” / Buenos Aires Music Video Awards Nominee “Best Video Latino” Buenos Aires Video Video Awards Nominee “Best Styling”
2021	Marc Anthony	Pa’ Alla Voy	
2021	Marc Anthony	Mala	
2021	Luis Fonsi + Rauw Alejandro	Vacio	
2021	Natti Natasha + Prince Royce	Antes que Salga El Sol	
2020	Sebastian Yatra + Ricky Martin	Falta Amor	
2020	Marc Anthony	Un Amor Eterno	Latin Grammy Winner “Best Short Form” Music Video
2020	Prince Royce + Wisin & Yandel	Aventura	
2020	Yandel + J Balvin	No Te Vayas	Berlin Music Video Awards Silver Selection
2019	Marc Anthony	Lo Que Te Di	
2019	Marc Anthony	Parecen Viernes	
2019	Luis Fonsi + Nicky Jam +Sebastian Yatra	Date La Vuelta	
2018	Ricky Martin + Wisin & Yandel	Fiebre	Premios Quiero “Best Pop Video” Nominee / Latin VideoClip Awards “Best Direction” “Best Edit” “Best Tropical Video – Fusion” Winner
2018	Marc Anthony + Will Smith + Bad Bunny	Esta Rico	
2018	Daddy Yankee	Dura	MTV VMA Nominee “Best Latin Video” / Heat Latin Awards Nominee “Best Video”
2018	Romeo Santos + Juan Luis Guerra	Carmin	
2017	Yandel	Mi Religion	
2017	Romeo Santos	Imitadora	
2017	Yandel	Nunca Me Olvides	Berlin Music Video Awards Nominee “Best Cinematography”
2017	Luis Fonsi + Daddy Yankee	Despacito	Latin Grammy Winner “Best Short Form” Music Video / 5x Guinness World Record / Billboard Music Award “Top Streaming Song/Video” WInner / American Music Award Nominee “Best Video” / Heart Music Awards Nominee “Best Music Video / ADC Awards Merit / 100 Greatest Music Videos of the 21st Century (Billboard Magazine)
2017	Luis Fonsi + Demi Lovato	Echame La Culpa	MTV VMA Nominee “Best Latin Video” / Billboard Music Award “Top Streaming Song/Video” Nominee / Heat Latin Awards Nominee “Best Video”
2016	Ricky Martin	Perdoname	
2015	Yandel	Encantadora	
2015	Bomba Estereo + Will Smith	Fiesta Remix	
2014	Ricardo Arjona	Apnea	Premios Lo Nuestro “Video of the Year” Nominee
2014	Natalia Jimenez	Creo En Mi	
2014	Yandel + Daddy Yankee	Moviendo Caderas	Premios Lo Nuestro “Video of the Year” Nominee
2014	Ricky Martin	Come With Me	Premios Lo Nuestro Nominee “Video of the Year” / World Music Awards Nominee “World’s Best Video”
2013	Draco Rosa + Ricky Martin	Mas y Mas	Premios Juventud Nominee “My Favorite VIdeo” - Premios People En Español “Best Video” Nominee
2013	Marc Anthony	Vivir Mi Vida	Premios People EN Español “Best Video” Nominee
2013	Yandel	Hable De Ti	World Music Awards Nominee “World’s Best Video” / Premios Lo Nuestro Nominee “Video of the Year”
2012	Prince Royce	Cosas Pequeñas	Premios Juventud Winner “My Favorite Video”
2011	Marc Anthony	A Quien Quiero Mentirle	
2010	Ricky Martin	Lo Mejor de Mi Vida Eres Tu	Latin Grammy Nominee ‘Best Short Form Musić Video” / Premios Juventud Nominee “My Favorite Video”
2010	Daddy Yankee	Grito Mundial	
2010	Los Temerarios	Loco Por Ti	
2010	Daddy Yankee	Descontrol	
2009	Mala Rodriguez	Volvere	
2009	Don Omar	Virtual Diva	
2009	Don Omar	The Chosen	
2009	Don Omar	System Upgrade	
2009	Don Omar	Sexy Robotica	
2006	Daddy Yankee	Rompe	MTV VMAs “Best Hip Hop Video” Nominee
2006	Daddy Yankee + Snoop Dogg	Gangsta Zone	
2005	Don Omar + Tego Calderon	Bandoleros	
2005	Don Omar	Donqueo	
2004	Daddy Yankee	Corazones	
2004	Daddy Yankee	Gasolina	Premios De La Gente “Music Video of the Year” Winner / Nominee MTV VMA’s MTV2 “Best Music Video“ / MTV VMA’s (Japan) “Best Reggae Music Video“ Nominee / Track added to the Library of Congress Recording Registry
2004	Daddy Yankee	King Daddy	
2003	Ricky Martin	Tal Vez	Premios De La Gente “Music Video of the Year” Winner
2003	Ricky Martin	Jaleo	Premios Lo Nuestro “Video of the Year” Nominee / Viva Tv Awards “Best International Music Video”

=== Documentaries ===
Year	Artist	Title	Awards
2024	Marc Anthony	Muevensen: Creative Conversation with Lin-Manuel Miranda	Webbys - Honorable Mention - Documentary Telly Awards - Silver Award - Documentary
2024	Christian Nodal	Pal’Cora	
2019	Juanes	Aire Fresco	
2009	Free Tempo	Victory	Latin Grammy Nominee ‘Best Long Form Musić Video
2005	Daddy Yankee	Barrio Fino En Directo	
