= Letting Go (Cry Just a Little) =

Single by Qwote featuring Mr. Worldwide

from the album Ultra Dance 14
- Released: August 12, 2012
- Recorded: 2012
- Length: 3:49
- Label: Ultra
- Songwriters: Armando Pérez; Qwote; Brenda Russell
- Producers: The Crew, JU-BOY

Qwote singles chronology
"Throw Your Hands Up (Dançar Kuduro)" (2011)	"Letting Go (Cry Just a Little)" (2012)	"Same Ship" (2012)

Music video
- "Letting Go (Cry Just a Little) Official Music Video" on YouTube

"Letting Go (Cry Just a Little)" is a song written and performed by singer Qwote and rapper Pitbull, the latter of whom is credited as Mr. Worldwide. The song was released on August 14, 2012 as the lead single from Ultra Dance 14, a compilation album released by Qwote's record label, Ultra Records. The song was produced by The Crew and JU-BOY and interpolates the chorus from "Piano in the Dark" by Brenda Russell.

This is Pitbull's only official song to be credited as "Mr. Worldwide".

== Music video ==
The music video was filmed in Los Angeles and directed by David Rousseau. The music video takes place in an empty house, where Qwote and his love interest (played by Susanna Janson) are in a family feud. Pitbull is seen rapping on a television, which the love interest watches. She then kicks the television as Pitbull finishes his verse. In the end, Qwote reconciles with the woman. The video has garnered a combined 1 million views on YouTube.

== Chart history ==
Chart (2013)	Peak position
US Hot Dance/Electronic Songs (Billboard)	35
