= Emigrante del Mundo (song) =

Single by Lucenzo

from the album Emigrante del Mundo
- Released: 2007 / 2010
- Recorded: 2007
- Genre: Dancehall
- Length: 3:14
- Label: Yanis Records (2007); Scorpio France (2010)
- Songwriter(s): Luís Filipe Fraga Oliveira; Faouzi Barkati; Fabrice Cyril Toigo

Lucenzo singles chronology
"Emigrante del Mundo" (2007)	"Vem Dançar Kuduro" (2010)

Music video
- "Emigrante del Mundo" on YouTube

"Emigrante del Mundo" is the debut single by Lucenzo. It was released in France initially in 2007 and a second time in 2010 after the success of the kuduro music promoted by Lucenzo's newer hits. The song appears on his debut album of the same name, released in 2011.

== Track list ==
1. "Emigrante del Mundo" (radio version) (3:14)
2. "Emigrante del Mundo" (instrumental) (3:17)
