= Algo Me Gusta de Ti =

Single by Wisin & Yandel featuring Chris Brown and T-Pain

from the album Líderes
- Released: August 17, 2012
- Genre: Dance-pop
- Length: 4:35
- Label: WY; Machete
- Songwriters: Juan Luis Morera; Llandel Veguilla; Luis O'Neill; Chris Jedi
- Producers: O'Neill; Chris Jedi

Wisin & Yandel singles chronology
"Follow the Leader" (2012)	"Algo Me Gusta de Ti" (2012)	"Hipnotizame" (2013)

Chris Brown singles chronology
"Don't Judge Me" (2012)	"Algo Me Gusta de Ti" (2012)	"Celebration" (2012)

T-Pain singles chronology
"So Listen" (2012)	"Algo Me Gusta de Ti" (2012)	"Up Down (Do This All Day)" (2013)

"Algo Me Gusta de Ti" (English: I Like Something About You) is a song by Puerto Rican duo Wisin & Yandel featuring American singers Chris Brown and T-Pain, released as the second single the former's album Líderes. There is an English version, entitled "Something About You," which also features Chris Brown and T-Pain and a solo version by the duo which replaces the featured artists verses. It spent 14 weeks at number-one on the Billboard Hot Latin Songs and 12 weeks on Billboard Latin Pop Airplay, becoming their longest reigning number-one single in both charts. Carlos Quintana called this as one of the best tracks of Lideres.

== Music video ==
The video was released on August 17, 2012, and was directed by Jessy Terrero. It begins with a Latino millionaire taunting his nerdy servant cleaning his swimming pool. After his boss leaves, the servant takes off his clothes after and jumps into the swimming pool, where he magically is teleported to a party with Wisin & Yandel, Chris Brown and T-Pain singing and dancing.

== Charts ==
=== Weekly charts ===
Chart (2012–2013)	Peak position
Colombia (National-Report)	4
Honduras (Honduras Top 50)	2
Slovakia Airplay (ČNS IFPI)	16
US Bubbling Under Hot 100 (Billboard)	10
US Hot Latin Songs (Billboard)	1
US Latin Airplay (Billboard)	1
US Latin Pop Airplay (Billboard)	1
US Latin Rhythm Airplay (Billboard)	1
US Heatseekers Songs (Billboard)	15
Venezuela Top 100 (Record Report)	1

=== Year-end charts ===
Chart (2012)	Position
US Hot Latin Songs (Billboard)	31
Chart (2013)	Position
US Hot Latin Songs (Billboard)	6

=== Decade-end charts ===
Chart (2010–2019)	Position
US Hot Latin Songs (Billboard)	19

== Certifications ==
Region	Certification	Certified units/sales
Spain (Promusicae)	Platinum	60,000^{‡}
^{‡} Sales+streaming figures based on certification alone.

== See also ==
- List of Billboard number-one Latin songs of 2012
- List of Billboard number-one Latin songs of 2013
- List of Billboard Latin Rhythm Airplay number ones of 2012
- List of Billboard Latin Rhythm Airplay number ones of 2013
