= Dutty Love (song) =

2012 song by Don Omar and Natti Natasha

Single by Don Omar featuring Natti Natasha

from the album Don Omar Presents MTO²: New Generation
- Released: March 9, 2012
- Recorded: 2011
- Genre: Reggaeton; pop
- Length: 4:45
- Label: Universal Latin; Machete
- Songwriters: Don Omar; Milton Restituyo
- Producers: A&X; Link-On; DJ Robin

Don Omar singles chronology
"Estoy Enamorado" (2011)	"Dutty Love" (2012)	"Hasta Que Salga el Sol" (2012)

"Dutty Love" is a Latin tropical pop song by Don Omar, also featuring singer Natti Natasha, that was released as the first single from Don Omar's compilation album Don Omar Presents MTO²: New Generation (2012) and in Orfanato Music Group's first mixtape Love is Pain (2011). The song was released digitally on March 9, 2012. The song was nominated for Collaboration and Urban Song of the Year at the Premio Lo Nuestro 2013. It won the Billboard Latin Music Award for Latin Rhythm Airplay Song of the Year in 2013.

== Charts ==
=== Weekly charts ===
Chart (2012)	Peak position
Colombia (National-Report)	1
Peru Airplay (UNIMPRO)	15
US Bubbling Under Hot 100 Singles (Billboard)	14
US Hot Latin Songs (Billboard)	1
US Latin Pop Airplay (Billboard)	1
US Tropical Airplay (Billboard)	1
US Latin Rhythm Airplay (Billboard)	1

=== Year-end charts ===
Chart (2012)	Position
US Hot Latin Songs (Billboard)	2

=== Decade-end charts ===
Chart (2010–2019)	Position
US Hot Latin Songs (Billboard)	25

== See also ==
- List of Billboard number-one Latin songs of 2012
