= Lucenzo =

French reggaeton recording artist (born 1983)

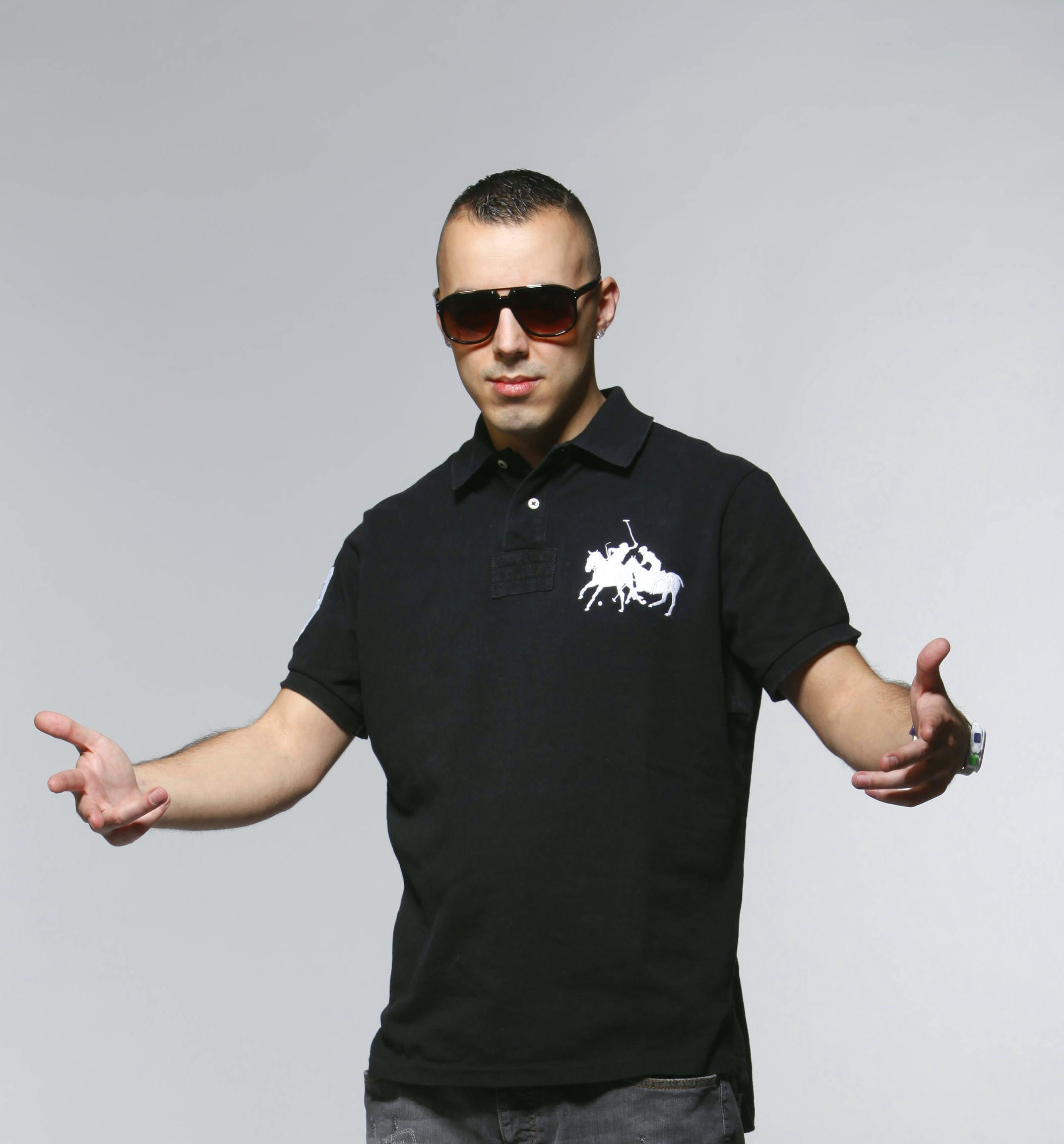
- Lucenzo in 2010

Background information
- Born: Luís Filipe Fraga Oliveira; 27 May 1983 (age 43); Bordeaux, Aquitaine, France
- Genres: Hip hop; reggaeton; kuduro
- Occupations: Singer; songwriter; rapper; record producer
- Years active: 2000–present
- Label: Universal Music
- Website: lucenzo.com

Luís Filipe Fraga Oliveira (European Portuguese pronunciation: [luˈiʃ fɨˈlipɨ ˈfɾaɣɐ ɔliˈvɐjɾɐ]; born 27 May 1983), better known by his stage name Lucenzo (pronounced [luˈsẽzu]), is a Portuguese-French reggaeton singer, songwriter, rapper and record producer. He has been signed with the Universal Music record label for most of his career, and is best known for his dance hit with rapper Big Ali, "Vem dançar Kuduro". Puerto Rican reggaeton artist Don Omar released a Spanish/Portuguese version of the song under the title "Danza Kuduro" with Lucenzo.

== Early years ==
Lucenzo was born in Bordeaux, Aquitaine, to Portuguese parents with origins in the village of Vilas Boas, Bragança. He began his career in hip-hop bands such as Sol da Noite and Les Portuguais de Bordeaux (French for "the Portuguese from Bordeaux") in 1998, and recorded his first album, which was never marketed due to financial reasons. In 2006, he released "Portugal é Nossa Terra" with DJ Lusitano, and thus he became popular in Portuguese music.

== Career ==
Lucenzo released his debut single in 2008, a Portuguese/multilingual reggae/reggaeton song entitled "Emigrante del mundo". Signed to Scopio Music, the song became a Portuguese radio hit. It was followed in 2009 by "Dame reggaeton". But it was with his bilingual English/Portuguese dance hit "Vem Dançar Kuduro" in collaboration with Big Ali produced by Lucenzo. It was a Top 40 hit in Switzerland, reaching #31. An alternative Spanish version by Don Omar with Lucenzo was released on 15 August 2010, entitled "Danza Kuduro". The accompanying music video was released on 17 August 2010. It is also featured on Don Omar's compilation album Meet the Orphans.

On 1 July 2015, Lucenzo released a new song "Vida Louca" in Portuguese and reserved to the Lusophone marker. It was part of a series of compilations VIDISCO and available on iTunes Portugal. At the end of July 2015, Lucenzo started promoting his single in Portugal and was invited to several televisions including SIC, RTP, TVi giving interviews where he explained that he wanted to book the premiere of his new work in Portugal before presenting it internationally in Spanish.

== Discography ==
=== Studio albums ===
Title	Album details	Peak chart positions				
Title	Album details	FRA	AUT	GER	POR	SWI
Emigrante del Mundo	Released: 30 September 2011; Label: Yanis, B1M1; Formats: CD, digital download	8	60	65	24	15

=== Singles as lead artist ===
List of singles as lead artist, with selected chart positions, showing year released and album name
Title	Year	Peak chart positions									Album
Title	Year	FRA	AUT	BEL (Wa)	DEN	FIN	NED	NOR	SWE	SWI	Album
"Emigrante del mundo"	2007	—	—	—	—	—	—	—	—	—	Emigrante del Mundo
"Vem Dançar Kuduro" (featuring Big Ali)	2010	2	—	5* (Ultratip)	14	12	—	15	1	31	Emigrante del Mundo
"Baila Morena"	2010	9	—	—	—	—	—	—	—	—	Emigrante del Mundo
"Wine It Up" (featuring Sean Paul)	2012	33	34	13* (Ultratip)	—	48	56	—	—	16	Non-album single
"Obsesión (Tropical Family)" (with Kenza Farah)	2013	16	—	7* (Ultratip)	—	—	—	—	—	—	Tropical Family
"Vida Louca"	2015	—	—	—	—	—	—	—	—	—	Non-album single
"Turn Me On"	2017	—	—	—	—	—	—	—	—	—	Non-album single
"No me ama"	2020	44	—	37	—	—	—	—	—	—	Non-album single
"Bailamos"	2021	73	—	43	—	—	—	—	—	—	Non-album single
"—" denotes a recording that did not chart or was not released in that territory.

*Did not appear in the official Belgian Ultratop 50 charts, but rather in the bubbling under Ultratip charts.

=== Songs featured in ===
List of singles as featured artist, with selected chart positions and certifications, showing year released and album name
Title	Year	Peak chart positions										Certifications	Album
Title	Year	AUT	GER	NL	SPA	SWI	US Latin	US Rhythm	US Tropical	US Latin Pop	US	Certifications	Album
"Danza Kuduro" (Don Omar and Lucenzo)	2010	1	1	1	1	1	1	1	1	1	82	US: 5× Platinum; GER: 7× Gold; ITA: 2× Platinum; SPA: 2× Platinum; SWI: Platinum	Meet the Orphans
"Throw Your Hands Up (Dançar Kuduro)" (Qwote featuring Pitbull and Lucenzo)	2011	3	—	—	—	—	—	—	—	—	—	ARIA: 3× Platinum; BPI: Gold	Non-album single
"—" denotes a recording that did not chart or was not released in that territory.

=== Notes ===
Although the U.S. Billboard Hot 100 chart comprise up to a hundred songs, the Bubbling Under Hot 100 Singles act as an extension to each chart. Thus, songs that have peaked up to these extension charts are listed in this discography under the Hot 100 with values over a hundred.

== Awards ==
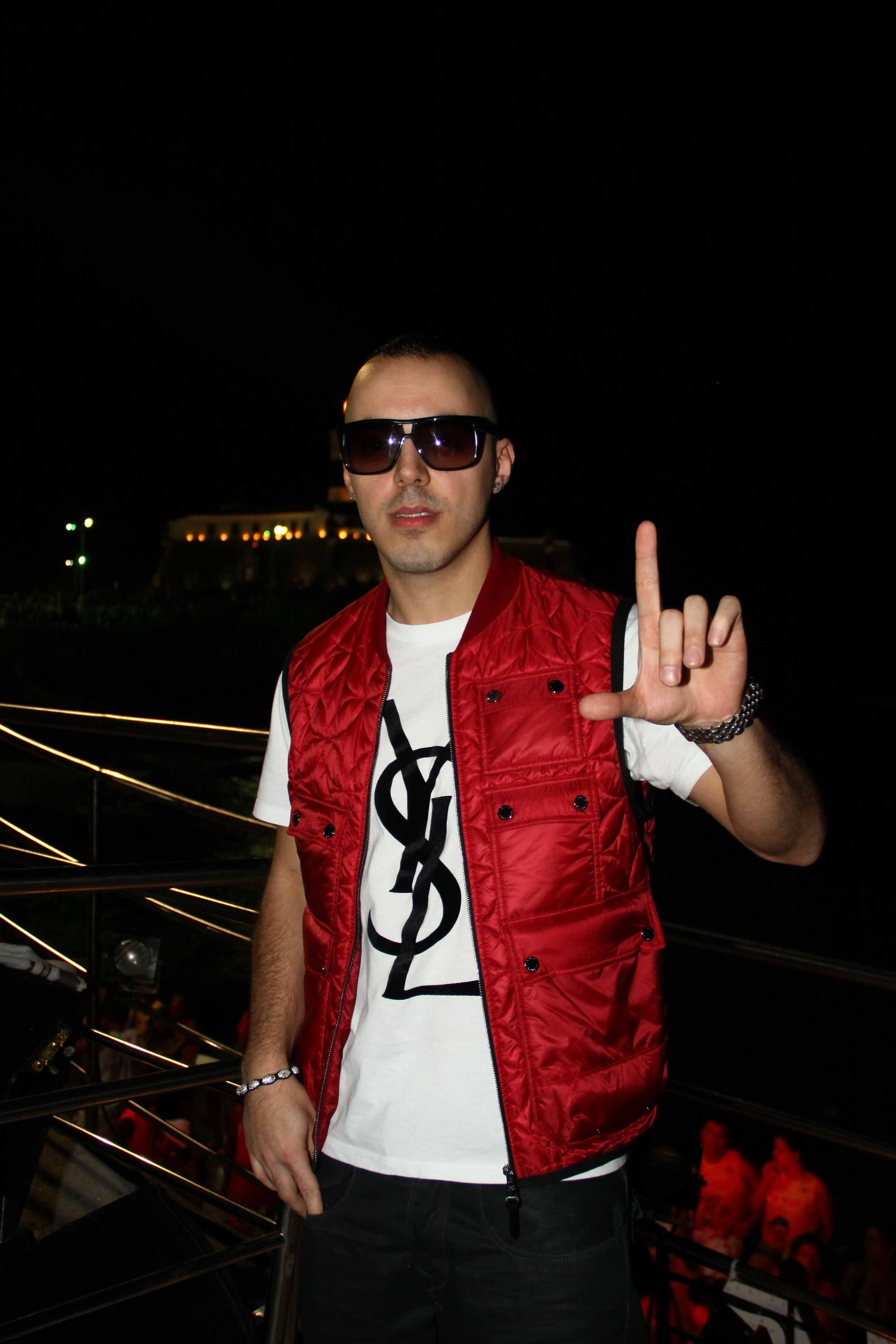
Lucenzo

=== 2011 ===
Latin Billboard

- Latin Rhythm Airplay: Danza Kuduro (Don Omar featuring Lucenzo)

=== 2012 ===
Latin Billboard

- Latin Song of the Year (Vocal event): Danza Kuduro (Don Omar featuring Lucenzo)
- Latin Rhythm Airplay: Danza Kuduro (Don Omar featuring Lucenzo)
- Digital Song of the Year: Danza Kuduro (Don Omar featuring Lucenzo)

American Billboard

- Top Latin Song: Danza Kuduro (Don Omar featuring Lucenzo)
