= Bandoleros (song) =

Single by Don Omar featuring Tego Calderón

from the album The Fast and the Furious: Tokyo Drift and Los Bandoleros
- Released: 2005
- Recorded: 2005
- Genre: Latin hip-hop
- Length: 3:15
- Label: All Star
- Songwriters: Tego Calderón; Jose Cruz; Paul Irizarry; Don Omar
- Producers: Echo; Diesel

Don Omar singles chronology
"Dale Don Dale (Remix)" (2005)	"Bandoleros" (2005)	"Donqueo" (2005)

Tego Calderón singles chronology
"Oye Mi Canto" (2005)	"Bandoleros" (2005)	"Los Maté" (2006)

"Bandoleros" is a song by Puerto Rican reggaeton artist Don Omar featuring Puerto Rican artist Tego Calderón. Released in 2005 as the lead single from his compilation album Los Bandoleros, it was also featured in the 2006 film The Fast and the Furious: Tokyo Drift. It has been referred to as one of the breakthrough songs that brought Latin hip-hop airplay to the United States.

The song was later featured in the 2009 film Fast & Furious and in the 2013 film Fast & Furious 6.

== Background ==
"Bandoleros" is one of the songs that brought Latin hip-hop airplay to the United States. It has both Don Omar and Tego Calderón talking about the reggaeton genre, and how they are at this point in their reputation. Tego Calderón talks about his respect for Tempo, who was in jail and got a lot of haters, and eventually regained respect among other rappers.

Omar told Billboard that he wrote the song in 2004 at a time in his life where he was receiving negative publicity. He went on to say that Calderón was the only musician in his genre that stood by his side during his judicial process in Puerto Rico.

== Music video ==
The music video shows Don Omar in a car talking on his cell phone, and Tego Calderón rapping in the streets about his reputation.

== Charts ==
Chart (2005)	Peak position
US Billboard Tropical Songs	12
US Billboard Latin Songs	18
US Billboard Latin Rhythm Airplay	10

== Other versions and covers ==
The music for this song is used in the "Fiji Gunda" by Pacifik.
