= Qwote =

Haitian American singer and rapper

- Born: Port-au-Prince, Haiti
- Genres: R&B; pop; dance; hip hop
- Occupations: Singer; songwriter; rapper
- Years active: 2008–present
- Labels: Slip-n-Slide Records; Final Cut Records; RCA Records (present); Jive Records (past)
- Website: www.qwote.net

James Leonard, known professionally as Qwote, is a Haitian American singer, rapper, and songwriter.

== Career ==
Qwote was born in Haiti and was raised by his grandmother in the United States. He started to write music at age 12. Residing at various times in Long Island, New York City, he later on moved to Miami, where he found his niche in the Miami clubs. He had his first big break appearing on rap artist Trina's 2008 album Still da Baddest on the song "Phone Sexx". He was featured alongside Pitbull on a minor hit in Austria called "Superstar" by Jump Smokers. His 2009 song "Don't Wanna Fight" featuring Trina became a hit in New Zealand. He recorded a rearranged version of the same song with Shaggy and a second one with Pitbull. He also recorded "Shawty It's Your Booty".

In 2011, Qwote recorded a version of Lucenzo's "Vem Dançar Kuduro" titled "Throw Your Hands Up (Dançar Kuduro)". This version is credited to Qwote featuring Pitbull and Lucenzo. It entered the UK Singles Chart straight in at No. 13 in its first week of release.

== Discography ==
=== Mixtapes ===
List of mixtapes, with year released
Title	Album details
Best of Both Worlds (Ladies Edition) (with Trina)	Released: March 10, 2009; Label: Self-released; Format: Digital download

=== Singles ===
==== As lead artist ====
List of singles as lead artist, with selected chart positions and certifications, showing year released and album name
Title	Year	Peak chart positions			Certifications	Album
Title	Year	NZ	UK	US Dance	Certifications	Album
"Don't Wanna Fight" (with Trina)	2009	27	—	—		Best of Both Worlds (Ladies Edition)
"Throw Your Hands Up (Dançar Kuduro)" (featuring Pitbull and Lucenzo)	2011	29	13	—	ARIA: 3× Platinum	Non-album single
"Letting Go (Cry Just a Little)" (featuring Pitbull)	2012	—	—	35		Ultra Dance 14
"—" denotes a recording that did not chart or was not released in that territory.

==== As featured artist ====
List of singles as featured artist, with selected chart positions, showing year released and album name
Title	Year	Peak chart positions					Album
Title	Year	UK	AUS	AUT	GER	SUI	Album
"Bedroom" (Redd featuring Qwote and Pitbull)	2012	—	—	39	40	41	Non-album singles
"Baby It's the Last Time" (R. J. featuring Flo Rida and Qwote)	2012	—	—	59	93	—	Non-album singles
"—" denotes a recording that did not chart or was not released in that territory.

=== Other charted songs ===
List of songs, with selected chart positions, showing year released and album name
Title	Year	Peak chart positions	Album
Title	Year	AUT	Album
"Superstar" (Jump Smokers featuring Pitbull and Qwote)	2010	41	Kings of the Dancefloor!
"—" denotes a recording that did not chart or was not released in that territory.
