= Meet the Orphans =

Studio album by Don Omar
- Released: November 16, 2010
- Recorded: 2009–2010
- Genres: Reggaeton; hip hop; lambada; kuduro
- Length: 58:35 (standard edition); 76:59 (deluxe edition)
- Labels: Machete; Orfanato
- Producers: Don Omar: Luny Tunes; Eliel; Danny Fornairs; Dj Casper / Omar; Lucenzo; Marcos G; A&X; Robin; Linkon

Don Omar chronology
iDon (2009)	Meet the Orphans (2010)	Don Omar Presents MTO²: New Generation (2012)

Singles from Meet The Orphans
- 1. "Hasta Abajo" Released: October 27, 2009; 2. "Danza Kuduro" Released: August 15, 2010; 3. "Huérfano De Amor" Released: January 4, 2011; 4. "Taboo" Released: January 24, 2011

Meet the Orphans is the fourth studio album by reggaeton artist, Don Omar, released on November 16, 2010. The album features the artists under the "Orfanato Music Group" label and other reggaeton artists. The album includes the promotional single "Hasta Abajo" and the album's lead single "Danza Kuduro" featuring French-born Portuguese singer Lucenzo, as well as collaborations from Don Omar's Orfanato Music Group. artists including Kendo Kaponi, Danny Fornaris, Syko, Plan B, Zion & Lennox, and Yaga & Mackie. It was nominated for a Lo Nuestro Award for Urban Album of the Year.

The album and singles won 8 Awards for Billboard Latin Music Awards and finalists for 16 nominations in 14 categories. and was nominated for Latin Grammy Awards in 2011.

== Background ==
The album was initially planned as the re-release album from iDon, titled first iDon 2.0, and later Prototype 2.0. In September 2009, Reggaeton singer Daddy Yankee confirmed work on Omar's new album, following by the remix version of "Hasta Abajo". However, none of the collaborations with Yankee including the remix, were included on the album. It was set to be released in fall 2009 but was cancelled. Following the cancellation of the re-release album from iDon, it was announced that Don Omar would turn his attention to recording a new full length collaboration album from scratch which would feature other reggaeton artists.

=== Release ===
The album was set to be released on August 24, 2010, through Orfanato Music Group. back later was on October 19, 2010, the album was to be released finally on November 2, 2010, but the release date was newly changed to November 16, 2010. The album was released on two editions, a Standard edition with 14 tracks and a Deluxe edition that includes 19 tracks and the music video of "Danza Kuduro", both editions were released the same day. On the iTunes Store both editions include the bonus track "Carta al Cielo" and a Digital booklet.

== Reception ==
=== Critical response ===
Professional ratings
Review scores
Source	Rating
AllMusic	3.5/5 stars
The Washington Post	(favorable)

David Jeffries from Allmusic gave the album 3.5 stars out of 5. Here is an extract of his review: "a mix of new and old music – a must for Don Omar fans and worth considering if you're curious, but unfamiliar, with what's happening in the reggaeton genre 2010."

Allison Stewart from The Washington Post said that "Omar is on safer ground on Don Omar Presents: Meet the Orphans, a collection of tracks spotlighting the artists and producers of his El Orfanato record label. It's a curiously old-fashioned concept, like an old-school mix tape or a lower-wattage version of P. Diddy's epochal '01 Bad Boy showcase, The Saga Continues. Though Meet the Orphans is studded with tales of social uplift (like the sluggish, serious "Angeles Y Demonios"), it's most agreeable when it sticks to fare like last summer's inescapable "Danza Kuduro", a warp-speed, tropical/meringue/pop redo of French Portuguese singer Lucenzo's hit "Vem dançar kuduro" (with Lucenzo included).

=== Chart performance and sales ===
In United States, Meet the Orphans debuted at #101 with sales of 7,420, on the Billboard 200. It was the 10th best selling Latin album in the USA of the mid 2011 with 40,000 copies sold. The album sold 2 million of singles as of 2011 and 1.5 million of mobile downloads. The album also debuted at #2 on Billboard's Top Latin Albums charts, and became his seventh top ten album and his sixth highest album debut on the top ten, it also debuted at #1 on Billboard's Latin Rhythm Albums charts. and at #8 on Billboard's Top Rap Albums charts. According to Universal Music Latino, the album certified platinum after its first 48 hours sales in Southern California. On the Mexican Albums Chart the album debuted at #81. The following week the album jumped at #69 and peaked at #47.

== Promotion ==
Prior to the release of the album, four promotional singles were released exclusively on Apple's iTunes Store as a "Countdown to Meet the Orphans". The album Meet The Orphans was top with songs Billboard.

- "Hooka" was released as the first promotional single and it was released on iTunes on September 21, 2010. It features Plan B. was top 10 Latin Digital Song Sales for Billboard in 2010. and was top 10 Best Collaborations for Billboard in 2021.
- "Good Looking" was released as the second promotional single and it was released on iTunes on September 28, 2010. was top 32 Latin Digital Song Sales for Billboard in 2010.
- "El Duro" was released as the third promotional single and it was released on iTunes on October 12, 2010. It features Kendo Kapponi. was top 28 Latin Digital Song Sales for Billboard in 2010.
- "Ángeles y Demonios" was released as the fourth promotional single and it was released on iTunes on October 19, 2010. It features Kendo Kapponi and Syko.

== Singles ==
- "Danza Kuduro" was released as the album's lead single on August 15, 2010, it features French singer Lucenzo, who is of Portuguese origin. The song topped on the Billboard Latin Songs, becoming his second number-one single on the chart. A music video directed by long-time Don Omar collaborator Carlos Pérez was released on July 30, 2010, through Omar's Facebook account.
- "Huérfano De Amor" was released as the second single early 2011, the song features Syko. The music video was premiered on January 4, 2011. It was directed by Alejandro Santiago Ciena.
- "Taboo" was released as the album's third single on April 11, 2011. The video for this single was shot in St. Maarten and was directed by Marlon Pena. Additionally, it incorporates a sample from Kaoma's 1989 single "Lambada" fused with Latin beats.
- "Estoy Enamorado" included on the Deluxe Edition from the album, performed only by Danny Fornaris, was released to radio as the fourth single in conjunction to "Huérfano De Amor". The video for the song was released on March 10, 2011.

Other releases

- "Hasta Abajo" was released as the album's promo single on October 27, 2009. The song was charted at number nine on the Billboard Latin Songs, becoming his seventh top ten single on the chart. The music video for the song, also directed by Carlos Pérez, was premiered on November 14, 2010.
- "Ella Ella" was released on November 16, 2010, with collaboration Zion y Lennox production by Robin, was top 45 Latin Digital Song Sales for Billboard.

== Track listing ==
Standard edition
No.	Title	Writer(s)	Producer(s)	Length
1.	"Orphanization" (featuring Kendo Kaponi & Syko)	William Landrón, Armando Rosario	Eliel	3:55
2.	"El Duro" (featuring Kendo Kaponi)	Landrón, Jose F Rivera	Dj Luian, Marcos G, Lil Wizard	4:07
3.	"Hasta Abajo"	Landrón, Eliel Lind, Everton Bonner, John Taylor, Sly Dunbar, Lloyd Willis	Eliel	3:52
4.	"Hooka" (featuring Plan B)	Landrón, Lind, Raphy Pina	Eliel	3:58
5.	"Ángeles y Demonios" (featuring Kendo Kaponi & Syko)	Landrón, Rivera, Christian Ramos, Paul F Irizarry Suau	Dj Luian, Marcos G, Mercury	6:02
6.	"Good Looking"	Landrón, Daniel Fornaris	Danny Fornaris, Luny Tunes	4:19
7.	"Taboo"	Landrón, Gonzalo Hermosa, Ulises Hermosa, Milton Restituyo	A&X	4:52
8.	"Viviendo Con el Enemigo" (featuring Kendo Kaponi)	Landrón, Rivera, Restituyo, Juan A. Abreu	Danny Fornaris, A&X	4:25
9.	"Sr. Destino"	Landrón, Restituyo, Abreu, Joel Báez Nieves	A&X	3:44
10.	"Huérfano de Amor" (featuring Syko)	Landrón, Ramos	Lil Wizard & Marcos G	4:52
11.	"Ella, Ella" (featuring Zion & Lennox)	Landrón, Robin Mendez, Felix Ortiz, Gabriel Pizarro	Robin, Linkon	3:23
12.	"Danza Kuduro" (with Lucenzo)	Landrón, Philippe De Oliveira, Faouze Barkati, Fabrice Toigo	Lucenzo	3:19
13.	"Luna Llena"	Landrón, Restituyo, Abreu, Lincoln	A&X, Robin, Linkon	4:09
14.	"RX" (featuring Kendo Kaponi)	Landrón, Rivera	Danny Fornaris	3:45
Total length:				58:35

iTunes bonus track
No.	Title	Writer(s)	Producer(s)	Length
15.	"Carta al Cielo" (featuring Syko)	Landrón, Ramos, Restituyo, Abreu	A&X	5:10
16.	"La Batidora 2" (featuring Yaga y Mackie)	Landron	A&X	3:35
17.	"Cheaters"	Landron	A&X	4:49
18.	"Dra. X"	Landron	A&X & Lincon	3:53
19.	"Danza Kuduro" (remix; featuring Lucenzo, Daddy Yankee & Arcangel)	Landron & Lucenzo	A&X	3:35

Deluxe edition
No.	Title	Writer(s)	Producer (s)	Length
1.	"Orphanization" (featuring Kendo Kaponi & Syko)	Landrón, Rosario		3:55
2.	"El Duro" (featuring Kendo Kaponi)	Landrón, Rivera	Lil Wizard, Dj Luian & Marcos G	4:07
3.	"Hasta Abajo"	Landrón, Lind, Bonner, Taylor, Dunbar, Willis		3:52
4.	"Hooka" (featuring Plan B)	Landrón, Lind, Pina		3:57
5.	"Ángeles y Demonios" (featuring Kendo Kaponi & Syko,)	Landrón, Rivera, Ramos, Irizarry		6:01
6.	"Good Looking"	Landrón, Fornaris		4:18
7.	"Taboo"	Landrón, Hermosa, Hermosa, Restituyo		4:52
8.	"Viviendo Con El Enemigo" (featuring Kendo Kaponi)	Landrón, Rivera, Restituyo, Abreu		4:24
9.	"Sr. Destino"	Landrón, Restituyo, Abreu, Baez		3:44
10.	"Luna Llena"	Landrón, Restituyo, Abreu, Lincoln		4:08
11.	"Huérfano De Amor" (featuring Syko)	Landrón, Ramos	Lil Wizard & Marcos G	4:52
12.	"Rx" (featuring Kendo Kaponi)	Landrón, Rivera		3:44
13.	"Ella Ella" (featuring Zion & Lennox)	Landrón, Mendez, Ortiz, Pizarro		3:22
14.	"Danza Kuduro" (featuring Lucenzo)	Landrón, De Oliveira, Barkati, Toigo		3:18
15.	"Vivos y Activos"	Landrón, Mendez	Robin, Linkon	3:46
16.	"Que Es La Que Hay" (featuring Kendo Kaponi & Syko)	Landrón, Mendez	Lil Wizard	4:06
17.	"Beyond 3000" (featuring Syko)	Ramos, Restituyo, Lincoln, Natalia Gutierrez	Linkon	3:30
18.	"Incognita" (featuring Kendo Kaponi)	Landrón, Ramos	Lil Wizard	3:41
19.	"Estoy Enamorado" (Danny Fornaris)	Landrón, Fornaris	Danny Fornaris	3:21
Total length:				76:59

iTunes bonus content
No.	Title	Writer(s)	Length
20.	"Carta al Cielo" (featuring Syko)	Landrón, Ramos, Restituyo, Abreu	5:10
21.	"Danza Kuduro" (featuring Lucenzo; music video)		3:56

Deluxe edition – bonus DVD
No.	Title	Length
1.	"MTO" (EPK)	7:18
2.	"Hasta Abajo" (music video)	6:01
3.	"Danza Kuduro" (featuring Lucenzo; music video)	3:56

Notes

- On the iTunes Store both editions include a Digital booklet as bonus content.
- In some Deluxe editions, the track list may include in different order, the same tracks.

== Personnel ==
Taken and adapted from Allmusic.com.

- William Omar Landrón (Don Omar) – composer, executive producer, producer
- Juan A. Abreu – composer
- Faouze Barkati – composer
- Everton Bonner – composer
- Lincoln Noel Castañeda – composer
- Sly Dunbar – composer
- Natalia Gutiérrez – composer
- Gonzalo Hermosa – composer
- Ulises Hermosa – composer
- De Oliveira Philippe Louis (Lucenzo) – composer, producer
- Robin Méndez – composer
- Joel Baez Nieves – composer
- Féliz Ortiz – composer
- Raphy Pina – composer
- Gabriel Pizarro – composer
- Christian Ramos – composer

- Milton J. Restituyo – composer
- José F. Rivera – composer (Kendo Kapponi)
- Armando Rosario – composer
- Philip Smart – composer
- John Taylor – composer
- Fabrice Toigo – composer
- Lloyd "Gitsy" Willis – composer
- Daniel Fornaris – composer, producer
- Danny Fornaris – composer, producer
- Eliel Lind – composer, producer
- Tom Coyne – mastering
- A&X – producer
- Jonathan De La Cruz (Lil Wizard)– Producer & Composer
- Marcos G – producer
- Reggie Delgadillo – producer
- Vincent Eget – director
- Danny Hastings – director, photography

== Charts ==
=== Weekly charts ===
Weekly chart performance for Meet the Orphans
Chart (2010–11)	Peak position
Ecuadorian Albums Chart	32
Mexican Albums Chart	47
Spanish Albums Chart	45
US Billboard 200	101
US Latin Rhythm Albums (Billboard)	1
US Top Latin Albums (Billboard)	2
US Top Rap Albums (Billboard)	8

=== Year-end charts ===
2011 year-end chart performance for Meet the Orphans
Chart (2011)	Position
US Top Latin Albums	9

== Sequel ==
- Don Omar Presents MTO²: New Generation

== See also ==
- List of number-one Billboard Latin Rhythm Albums of 2010
