= Wine It Up =

Single by Lucenzo featuring Sean Paul
- Released: July 9, 2012
- Recorded: 2012
- Genre: Dance, Kuduro
- Length: 3:26
- Label: Yanis Records, Universal Music
- Songwriter(s): Lucenzo, Sean Paul
- Producer(s): Lucenzo

Lucenzo singles chronology
"Throw Your Hands Up (Dancar Kuduro)" (2011)	"Wine It Up" (2012)	"Obsesión" (2013)

Sean Paul singles chronology
"Dream Girl" (2012)	"Wine It Up" (2012)	"How Deep Is Your Love" (2012)

"Wine It Up" is a Portuguese-language and English-language song by Lucenzo and Sean Paul, written by Lucenzo and Sean Paul and produced by Lucenzo. It was released on the July 9, 2012 by Yanis Records. The song has charted in France.

== Track listing ==
Digital download

1. "Wine It Up" (featuring Sean Paul) [Radio Edit] – 3:26

== Credits and personnel ==
- Lead vocals – Lucenzo and Sean Paul
- Producers – Lucenzo
- Lyrics – Lucenzo, Sean Paul
- Label: Yanis Records, Universal Music

== Chart performance ==
Chart (2012)	Peak position
Austria (Ö3 Austria Top 40)	24
Belgium (Ultratip Bubbling Under Flanders)	27
Belgium (Ultratip Bubbling Under Wallonia)	6
France (SNEP)	30
Germany (GfK)	39
Netherlands (Dutch Top 40)	42
Switzerland (Schweizer Hitparade)	13

== Release history ==
Region	Date	Format	Label
France	July 9, 2012	Digital download	Yanis Records

== Notes ==
- Wine It Up (Single) – Lucenzo Ft. Sean Paul Universal Music
- http://artists.letssingit.com/lucenzo-lyrics-wine-it-up-9hdgwc5
- http://www.nrj.fr/actus-3965/actu-music-524/article/287674-lucenzo-et-sean-paul-se-retrouvent-sur-wine-it-up-.html NRJ
- http://www.activradio.com/info/musique/Lucenzo-Wine-It-Up-feat.-Sean-Paul-430.html
- http://www.buzzraider.fr/2012/07/lucenzo-feat-sean-paul-wine-it-up/
- http://www.justmusic.fr/actualites/wine-it-up-le-nouveau-tube-de-lucenzo-13536
- http://www.funradio.fr/article/funradio/7750571627/ecoutez-le-nouveau-lucenzo-feat-sean-paul-wine-it-up Fun Radio (France)
- http://www.chartsinfrance.net/Lucenzo/news-80711.html
