= Los Bandoleros (album) =

Compilation album by Don Omar
- Released: May 10, 2005
- Genres: Reggaeton; hip hop
- Labels: All Star; VI
- Producer: Don Omar

Don Omar chronology
The Last Don Live (2004)	Los Bandoleros (2005)	Da Hitman Presents Reggaetón Latino (2005)

Los Bandoleros is a compilation reggaeton CD produced by Don Omar and released under his label All Star Records in 2005. It is named for "Bandoleros", a song on the CD.

== Track listing ==
1. "Intro" - Gallego - 2:58
2. "Donqueo" - Don Omar - 4:21
3. "Acelerá" - Angel Doze - 3:24
4. "Me Arrepiento" - Zion & Lennox - 3:11
5. "Bandoleros" - Don Omar & Tego Calderón - 5:05
6. "Según Tú" - Ivy Queen - 3:08
7. "Dale Vaquero" - Alexis & Fido - 2:47
8. "Soy Tu Bandolero" - Yaga & Mackie - 3:22
9. "Te Quitas o Nos Matamos" - Polaco ft. Don Omar - 4:12
10. "Hoy Nos Vamos Calle" - Trebol Clan - 3:45
11. "Presión" - Valentino - 4:06
12. "Fiera" - Mario VI - 3:18
13. "Dale Mami Pégate" - Nicky Jam - 2:52
14. "Si la Ves" - R.K.M & Ken-Y ft. Don Omar - 3:17
15. "Chula" - John Eric - 3:06
16. "Química" - Don Omar ft. Wiso G - 3:28
17. "Vamos a Darle" - Cosculluela - 3:25
18. "Somos Bandoleros" - Lito & Polaco - 3:11
19. "Soy Quien Te Provoca" - Alberto Stylee & Nano MC - 3:43
20. "Ella Baila Sola" - Ñengo Flow & Guayo Man - 2:34
21. "Fuego, Fuego" - Andy Boy - 2:34
22. "En el Callejón" - Arcángel (produced by Echo) - 3:06
23. "Voy a Darte Sin Miedo" - Clásico - 2:29
24. "Tu Cuerpo Me Provoca" - Albizu & Lefty - 2:26

=== Notes ===
- The song "Bandoleros" is a popular Puerto Rican hip hop song by Don Omar and Tego Calderón. The advent of reggaeton on American culture has been swift, and this song had chart success in America and internationally.
- The song "Según Tú" was included on Ivy Queen's fifth studio album Flashback (2005) as the fifth single under the name "La Mala".

== Charts ==
Chart (2005)	Peak position
US Billboard 200	55
US Rap Albums (Billboard)	20
US Latin Albums (Billboard)	2
US Latin Rhythm Albums (Billboard)	2
Latin Amercian Albums (El Nacional)	3
