= Hasta Que Salga el Sol =

Single by Don Omar

from the album Don Omar Presents MTO²: New Generation
- Released: June 4, 2012
- Recorded: 2011
- Genre: Latin
- Length: 4:09
- Label: Universal Latino; Machete
- Songwriters: Ramon Casillas-Rios; Don Omar; Christian Ramos-Lopez
- Producer: Ray "El Ingeniero" Casillas.

Don Omar singles chronology
"Dutty Love" (2012)	"Hasta Que Salga el Sol" (2012)	"Ella No Sigue Modas" (2012)

"Hasta Que Salga el Sol" (English: "Until Sunrise") is a Latin tropical pop song written by Don Omar and is the second single from the compilation album Don Omar Presents MTO²: New Generation (2012). The song was released digitally on June 4, 2012. It was the official theme song of Miss Universe 2012, which was held in December 2012 and broadcast on NBC, Telemundo and streamed on the Xbox Live platform. "Hasta Que Salga el Sol" won the Latin Grammy Award for Best Urban Song and was nominated for Urban Song of the Year at the Premio Lo Nuestro 2013.

== Composition ==
"Hasta Que Salga el Sol" is a Latin song with Brazilian influences, running at 127 beats per minute.

== Charts ==
=== Weekly charts ===
Chart (2012)	Peak position
Colombia (National-Report)	4
Honduras (Honduras Top 50)	1
Spain (Promusicae)	19
US Bubbling Under Hot 100 Singles (Billboard)	5
US Hot Latin Songs (Billboard)	1
US Latin Pop Airplay (Billboard)	1
US Tropical Airplay (Billboard)	5
US Latin Rhythm Airplay (Billboard)	1

=== Year-end charts ===
Chart (2012)	Position
US Hot Latin Songs (Billboard)	11

== Other ==
The song is also used as a part of the Discovery Island Carnivale at Disney's Animal Kingdom in Walt Disney World.

== See also ==
- List of Billboard number-one Latin songs of 2012
