= Orfanato Music Group =

Puerto Rican record label

- Parent company: Universal Music Group
- Founded: 2007
- Founder: Don Omar
- Status: Defunct
- Distributor: Universal Music Group
- Genre: Reggaeton; bachata; hip hop
- Country of origin: United States
- Location: International
- Official website: orfanatomusicgroup.com

Orfanato Music Group (OMG) was a Puerto Rican record label in the music and performance production industry. OMG was created by William Landron, also known as Don Omar, in 2007. Orfanato Music Group is an independent record label, which represents artists. Its music repertoire is represented nationally and internationally within the Latino marketplace. Its strategy is to serve those interested in Latino music, including reggaeton, Latin hip hop, and bachata, amongst others. The producers and the company were recognized by Billboard.

== Artists ==
- Don Omar
- Natti Natasha
- Kendo Kaponi
- Syco "El Terror" ✟
- Chino y Nacho
- The Real DJ Casper
- Xavi
- La Mosca
- Rell

== Produced Albums ==
- Don Omar Presenta: Meet The Orphans (2010)
- Don Omar Presents MTO²: New Generation (2012)
- Natti Natasha - All About Me EP (2012)

== See also ==
- List of record labels
- Machete Music
