= Hasta Abajo (Don Omar song) =

Promotional single by Don Omar

from the album Meet the Orphans
- Released: October 27, 2009
- Genre: Reggaeton
- Length: 3:53
- Label: Universal Latino, Machete
- Songwriters: William Landrón, Eliel Lind, Everton Bonner, John Taylor, Sly Dunbar, Lloyd Willis
- Producer: Eliel

Hasta Abajo (English: "Get Down") is a song from Don Omar's collaborative album Meet the Orphans released as promotional single from the album on October 27, 2009 through Machete, VI. A remake of the song is also featured in the movie Unstoppable (2010 film). The song was nominated at the Latin Grammy Awards of 2010 on the category for "Best Urban Song".

== Background ==
The song was produced by Eliel. A verse in the song references putting on and listening to music from reggaeton artists El Cangri (Daddy Yankee), Wisin & Yandel, Randy, Ivy (Ivy Queen), Plan B and Tego Calderón, among others. The song was originally planned to be included on the re-release edition of iDon, titled iDon 2.0 or Prototype 2.0 but later was cancelled. On May 9, 2010 an official remix with Daddy Yankee was recorded and confirmed via Don Omar's official Twitter-page. It was premiered on December 8, 2009.

== Music video ==
Don Omar in the video

Two music videos were made for the single, the video for the solo version was filmed on New York City in November 2009. In December 2009 Don Omar stated through his official website that Daddy Yankee would appear on the second music video for the remix version, and that it would be directed by Carlos Pérez. The music videos for both versions were filmed on January 12, 2010, the Haiti earthquake day, according with Don Omar's Twitter. 2 teasers of the video were posted, the first on August 11, 2010 and the second on September 2, 2010. The music video for the version with Don Omar only, almost a year after the release of the song, was premiered on November 14, 2010. The video for the remixed version with Yankee, remains unreleased.

== Chart performance ==
The song debuted on number #25 on the Billboard Hot Latin Songs, reached number #9, on the Tropical Songs debuted on number #4 making it most highest debut without having a music video or album for this song, on this chart peaked to number #2, "Hasta Abajo" is also Don Omar's third number #1 hit on the Latin Rhythm Airplay Chart, topped for five weeks consecutives. The song is also charted on the Latin Pop Songs on number #12 and topped the Venezuelan Singles Chart for third time.

=== Charts ===
| Chart (2009–2010) | Peak position |
|---|---|
| Guatemala Airplay (Top Latino) | 1 |
| Honduras Airplay (Top Latino) | 1 |
| US Hot Latin Songs (Billboard) | 9 |
| US Latin Rhythm Airplay (Billboard) | 1 |
| US Tropical Airplay (Billboard) | 2 |
| US Latin Pop Airplay (Billboard) | 12 |
| Venezuelan Singles Chart | 1 |
| Venezuelan Latin Chart | 1 |

=== Year-end charts ===
| Chart (2010) | Position |
|---|---|
| US Latin Songs Year End 2010 | 43 |
| US Latin Tropical Songs Year End 2010 | 10 |

== Release history ==
| Region | Date | Format | Label |
|---|---|---|---|
| Worldwide | October 30, 2009 | Radio premiere | Machete, VI |
| Worldwide | November 17, 2009 | Digital download | Machete, VI |

== See also ==
- List of Billboard Latin Rhythm Airplay number ones of 2009
- List of Billboard Latin Rhythm Airplay number ones of 2010
