= Danza Kuduro =

Single by Don Omar and Lucenzo

from the album Meet the Orphans and Fast Five
- Language: Spanish; Portuguese
- Released: August 15, 2010
- Recorded: 2010
- Genre: Reggaeton; kuduro
- Length: 3:19
- Label: Machete
- Songwriters: William Landrón; Philippe Louis De Oliveira; Faouze Barkati; Fabrice Toigo
- Producer: Lucenzo

Don Omar singles chronology
"Ciao Bella" (2009)	"Danza Kuduro" (2010)	"Huérfano De Amor" (2011)

Lucenzo singles chronology
"Vem Dançar Kuduro" (2010)	"Danza Kuduro" (2010)	"Baila Morena" (2010)

Audio sample
- file; help

Music video
- "Danza Kuduro" on YouTube

"Danza Kuduro" (Spanish pronunciation: [ˈdansa kuˈðuɾo]; English: Kuduro Dance) is a Spanish/Portuguese song by Puerto Rican recording artist Don Omar and Portuguese–French singer Lucenzo, from Don Omar's collaborative album Meet the Orphans. The song is an adaptation of Lucenzo's "Vem Dançar Kuduro", a Portuguese/English one. It was released as the lead single from the album on August 15, 2010, through Machete and VI record labels.

"Danza Kuduro" became a hit in most Latin American countries, and eventually all over Europe. The song was number one on the Hot Latin Songs, giving Don Omar his second US Billboard Hot Latin Songs number-one hit and Lucenzo his first. A remake of the song is also featured in the 2011 movie Fast Five as an ending song and is on the film's soundtrack album. "Danza Kuduro" ended up being the most successful song with a significant number of verses in European Portuguese of the 2010s. The track ranked 43 on Rolling Stone's Greatest Latin Pop Songs.

Kuduro is a style of dancing, as well as a musical genre, from Angola. Brazilian rapper Daddy Kall and singer Latino released a Brazilian version of the song, "Dança Kuduro", with amended Portuguese lyrics.

== Background ==
The song, written and produced by Lucenzo, is mostly sung in Spanish by Don Omar, except for Lucenzo's lone verse in European Portuguese. The verse is taken from Lucenzo's previously released song "Vem Dançar Kuduro" (2010), featuring Big Ali. Kuduro is a dance style practiced in the southwestern African country of Angola. Originally designed to pay tribute to the many disfigured and disabled people within the country due to the deadly civil war that left landmines throughout the region, the dance is meant not only to pay tribute to these handicapped individuals, but also incorporate their erratic and jerky movements into the flow of the moves. While Portugal once retained control over its former colony the diasporic spread of the musically inspired dance craze has added to the feel of "world music" taking the concept of Kuduro from Brazil to Beijing.

== Critical reception ==
Amar Toor from Aol Radio Blog said that the song "showcases one of reggaeton's brightest stars at his absolute best. [...] Don Omar's song is so infectious, it will likely get buried in your mind after just one listen -- and trust us, that's a very good thing".

Monica Herrera from Billboard said "The propulsive beat is laced with crowd-pleasing electric accordion runs, over which Don Omar sings and raps about a simple yet evergreen concept: dancing up a storm. The song wisely shifts him toward more tropical-leaning material-a move all too familiar in reggaetón's post-boom era-while letting him continue to explore new sounds and maintain his hold over Latin dancefloors around the world." Allison Stewart from The Washington Post said that the song "exemplifies what Omar and company do best: It's a sunny, up-tempo, utterly winning variation on Latin dance pop. 'Orphans' otherwise contains seemingly infinite variations on reggaeton, though there's nothing else as great as the standard genre track 'Hasta Abajo', which appears here in un-remixed form". At the Latin Grammy Awards of 2011, "Danza Kuduro" received a nomination for Best Urban Song. It won the Billboard Latin Music Award for Latin Rhythm Airplay Song of the Year in 2011 and 2012.

== Commercial performance ==
The song debuted at number 48 on the Billboard Hot Latin Songs. One week later, the song debuted at number 34 on the Tropical Songs. The song has become Don Omar's second number-one hit on the Billboard Latin Songs, and also topped the Latin Rhythm Songs, Latin Tropical Songs. On the Venezuelan Airplay Chart from the Record Report, the song also reached the top of the Latin Chart, and peaked at number 2 on the main Top 100 Chart. Due to heavy airplay and strong sales in the US, on the issue of May 21, 2011, the song debuted at number 82 on the Billboard Hot 100 and number 93 on the Canadian Hot 100. It has sold over a million digital copies in the US by October 2012.

According to Universal Records, the single became a worldwide hit, reaching No. 1 in Argentina, Ecuador, Venezuela, Italy, the Netherlands, Spain, Romania, Austria, Switzerland, Germany, Sweden and on the US Hot Latin Songs chart, and making the top 5 in Serbia, Bosnia and Herzegovina, Colombia, Chile, Central America, Denmark, and Norway. The single found greater success especially in Italy, where it topped the charts for 10 straight weeks.

== Music video ==
A music video was filmed on the Caribbean island of St. Martin, and was directed by music video director Vincent Egret, a frequent collaborator of Lucenzo. Production was supervised by Frederico Panetta and his team 4brostudio (Marc-Olivier Jean, Anderson Jean, Dullin Jean, Fayolle Jean Jr.) worked on post-production.

The video shows the singers flaunting their wealth, with Don Omar inviting Lucenzo to a boat ride and picking him up in a BMW Z4. There are also scenes of women dancing around the two singers on the beach. A preview of the video was released through Omar's Facebook account on July 30, 2010. The full music video premiered on August 17, 2010, through Vevo. The video passed 1 million views within the first few days of its release, making "Danza Kuduro" the #3 Most Seen Video in the World. In 2018, the music video for "Danza Kuduro" reached one billion views.

The official music video for the song on YouTube is blocked in European countries except for Spain, Norway and Switzerland.

== Charts ==
=== Weekly charts ===
Weekly chart performance for "Danza Kuduro"
Chart (2010–2011)	Peak position
Austria (Ö3 Austria Top 40)	1
Belgium (Ultratop 50 Flanders)	7
Belgium (Ultratop 50 Wallonia)	14
Brazil Billboard Hot 100 Airplay	27
Canada (Canadian Hot 100)	88
CIS Airplay (TopHit)	5
Czech Republic Airplay (ČNS IFPI)	1
Denmark (Tracklisten)	3
Finland (Suomen virallinen lista)	5
France (SNEP)	6
Germany (GfK) Original Version From Fast & Furious	1
Hungary (Dance Top 40)	2
Hungary (Rádiós Top 40)	9
Israel (Media Forest)	3
Italy (FIMI)	1
Mexico Airplay Chart (Billboard International)	20
Netherlands (Dutch Top 40)	1
Netherlands (Single Top 100)	1
Norway (VG-lista)	2
Poland Dance (ZPAV)	5
Romania Airplay (Media Forest)	1
Russia Airplay (TopHit)	4
Spain (Promusicae)	1
Sweden (Sverigetopplistan)	3
Switzerland (Schweizer Hitparade)	1
Ukraine Airplay (TopHit)	9
US Billboard Hot 100	82
US Hot Latin Songs (Billboard)	1
US Latin Pop Airplay (Billboard)	1
US Tropical Airplay (Billboard)	1
US Latin Rhythm Airplay (Billboard)	1
Venezuelan Top 100 (Record Report)	2
Venezuelan Top Latino (Record Report)	1

2023–2026 chart performance for "Danza Kuduro"
Chart (2023–2026)	Peak position
Czech Republic Singles Digital (ČNS IFPI) Version MTO	73
Germany (Official German Charts)	63
Global 200 (Billboard)	75
Greece International (IFPI) Version MTO	43
Kazakhstan Airplay (TopHit)	33
Lithuania (AGATA) Version MTO	93
Luxembourg (Billboard)	25
Moldova Airplay (TopHit)	61
Poland (Polish Airplay Top 100)	43
Poland (Polish Streaming Top 100)	94
Portugal (AFP)	70
Romania Airplay (TopHit)	130
Slovakia Singles Digital (ČNS IFPI) Version MTO	49

=== Monthly charts ===
2011 monthly chart performance for "Danza Kuduro"
Chart (2011)	Peak position
CIS Airplay (TopHit)	4
Russia Airplay (TopHit)	3
Ukraine Airplay (TopHit)	18

2012 monthly chart performance for "Danza Kuduro"
Chart (2012)	Peak position
CIS Airplay (TopHit)	9
Russia Airplay (TopHit)	8
Ukraine Airplay (TopHit)	11

2023 monthly chart performance for "Danza Kuduro"
Chart (2023)	Peak position
Kazakhstan Airplay (TopHit)	72

2024 monthly chart performance for "Danza Kuduro"
Chart (2024)	Peak position
Kazakhstan Airplay (TopHit)	42

=== Year-end charts ===
2010 year-end chart performance for "Danza Kuduro"
Chart (2010)	Position
US Hot Latin Songs (Billboard)	40
US Latin Tropical Songs (Billboard)	20

2011 year-end chart performance for "Danza Kuduro"
Chart (2011)	Position
Austria (Ö3 Austria Top 40)	4
Belgium (Ultratop Flanders)	44
Belgium (Ultratop Wallonia)	78
Brazil (Crowley)	94
CIS Airplay (TopHit)	22
Denmark (Tracklisten)	40
France (SNEP)	12
Germany (Official German Charts)	12
Hungary (Dance Top 40)	11
Hungary (Rádiós Top 40)	43
Italy (FIMI)	3
Netherlands (Dutch Top 40)	14
Netherlands (Single Top 100)	12
Polish Dance Singles Chart	31
Romanian Top 100	8
Russia Airplay (TopHit)	19
Sweden (Sverigetopplistan)	2
Switzerland (Schweizer Hitparade)	4
Ukraine Airplay (TopHit)	130
US Hot Latin Songs (Billboard)	4

2012 year-end chart performance for "Danza Kuduro"
Chart (2012)	Position
Brazil (Crowley)	19
CIS Airplay (TopHit)	30
France (SNEP)	78
Russia Airplay (TopHit)	30
Sweden (Sverigetopplistan)	64
Switzerland (Schweizer Hitparade)	72
Ukraine Airplay (TopHit)	86

2023 year-end chart performance for "Danza Kuduro"
Chart (2023)	Position
Kazakhstan Airplay (TopHit)	125

2024 year-end chart performance for "Danza Kuduro"
Chart (2024)	Position
Hungary (Rádiós Top 40)	89
Kazakhstan Airplay (TopHit)	64

2025 year-end chart performance for "Danza Kuduro"
Chart (2025)	Position
France (SNEP)	119

=== Decade-end charts ===
Decade-end chart performance for "Danza Kuduro"
Chart (2010–2019)	Position
US Hot Latin Songs (Billboard)	11

=== All time charts ===
All-time chart performance for "Danza Kuduro"
Chart (All time)	Position
US Tropical Songs (Billboard)	1
US Hot Latin Songs (Billboard)	25

== Certifications ==
Certifications for "Danza Kuduro"
Region	Certification	Certified units/sales
Belgium (BRMA)	Gold	15,000^{*}
Brazil (Pro-Música Brasil)	Diamond	250,000^{‡}
Denmark (IFPI Danmark)	2× Platinum	180,000^{‡}
Germany (BVMI)	7× Gold	1,050,000^{‡}
Italy (FIMI)	3× Platinum	90,000^{*}
Japan (RIAJ)	Gold	100,000^{*}
Portugal (AFP)	4× Platinum	100,000^{‡}
Russia (NFPF) ringtone	Platinum	200,000^{*}
Spain (Promusicae)	4× Platinum	400,000^{‡}
Spain (Promusicae) Remix version	3× Platinum	180,000^{‡}
Sweden (GLF)	4× Platinum	160,000^{‡}
Switzerland (IFPI Switzerland)	Platinum	30,000^{^}
United Kingdom (BPI)	Platinum	600,000^{‡}
United States (RIAA)	5× Platinum	5,000,000^{‡}
Streaming
Greece (IFPI Greece) Version MTO	Gold	1,000,000^{†}
Japan (RIAJ)	Gold	50,000,000^{†}
^{*} Sales figures based on certification alone.^{^} Shipments figures based on certification alone.^{‡} Sales+streaming figures based on certification alone.^{†} Streaming-only figures based on certification alone.

== See also ==
- List of best-selling Latin singles
