= Un Lujo =

Studio album by Lucero and Joan Sebastian
- Released: 22 May 2012
- Recorded: 2011
- Studio: JS Studios (Cuernavaca)
- Genres: Latin pop, mariachi
- Length: 35:08
- Language: Spanish
- Label: Skalona
- Producer: Joan Sebastian

Lucero chronology
Mi Secreto de Amor (2011)	Un Lujo (2012)	Lucero en Concierto (2013)

Joan Sebastian chronology
Huevos Rancheros (2011)	Un Lujo (2012)	13 Celebrando el 13 (2013)

Singles from Un Lujo
- 1. "Caminar Contigo" Released: 5 January 2012; 2. "Diséñame" Released: 21 May 2012

Un Lujo (stylized as Un Lu*Jo) is a collaborative studio album released by Mexican recording artists Lucero and Joan Sebastian, which was released on 22 May 2012, by Skalona Records. Sebastian wrote and produced all tracks included, four performed by him, four songs by Lucero and three duets recorded by both.

Un Lujo debuted in the top five in the Billboard Top Latin Albums in the United States and within the top forty in Mexico. The lead album single – the duet "Caminar Contigo" – went on to chart in the top twenty of the Billboard Latin Songs and the second single, "Diséñame", performed by Sebastian also charted in Mexico and the United States. The album was nominated for a 2013 Billboard Mexican Music Award.

== Background ==
Mexican singer Lucero and fellow Mexican singer-songwriter Joan Sebastian were both signed to the same record label (Musart Records) during the 1980s, and Lucero recorded songs written by Sebastian on her albums Fuego y Ternura (1985) and Lucerito: Ocho Quince (1988). In 1992, Lucero included on her album Lucero De México Sebastian's song "Llorar" ("Cry") and was released as the lead single from the album reaching top thirty in the Billboard Latin Songs. In 2010, Lucero starred in the telenovela Soy Tu Dueña and was joined by Sebastian on the theme song titled "Golondrinas Viajeras" ("Traveler Swallows") which was later included on Sebastian's album Huevos Rancheros (2011).

== Recording and release ==
While shooting the telenovela Por Ella Soy Eva in March 2012, Lucero recorded and released "No Me Dejes Ir" ("Don't Let Me Go"), a song that was to be included on the soundtrack, and also revealed that she was still working on a new album to be titled Lujo produced by Joan Sebastian. Two months later the album title was announced as Un LuJo, using the first two letters of the names of both singers. Un Lujo includes four songs recorded by each performer individually and three duets. The song "Diséñame" ("Design Me") was presented by Sebastian at the Festival Acapulco 2012. Sebastian stated that the album is "a representation of the love and admiration we have for each other".

== Singles ==
The duet "Caminar Contigo" ("Walk with You") was selected as the album lead single and peaked at No. 18 in the Billboard Latin Songs and at No. 7 in the Regional Mexican Songs chart in the United States. "Diséñame", performed by Sebastian, was released as the second single, peaking at No. 13 in the Regional Mexican Songs chart. In Mexico, the song peaked at No. 10 on the Top General in the Monitor Latino charts and No. 3 in the Mexican Airplay Chart according to Billboard International chart.

== Track listing ==
All songs written by Joan Sebastian.

No.	Title	Performer(s)	Length
1.	"Caminar Contigo"	Lucero, Joan Sebastian	03:21
2.	"La Doma"	Lucero	02:58
3.	"Diséñame"	Sebastian	03:05
4.	"Alma Enamorada"	Lucero	02:59
5.	"Un Beso al Mundo"	Sebastian	03:14
6.	"Escándalo Social"	Lucero, Sebastian	03:18
7.	"Adicta"	Lucero	03:06
8.	"Un Vestido de Besos"	Sebastian	03:00
9.	"Jardinera"	Lucero	02:59
10.	"Díganle"	Sebastian	03:53
11.	"Desliz"	Lucero, Sebastian	03:16

== Chart performance ==
In the United States, Un Lujo debuted and peaked at No. 4 in the Billboard Top Latin Albums, and reached the top of the Regional Mexican Albums chart in the second week. The album peaked at No. 24 in Mexican Album Charts, lower than the previous releases by both performers, Indispensable by Lucero (#16) and Huevos Rancheros by Sebastian (#8). Un Lujo was nominated for Ranchero/Mariachi Album of the Year at the 2013 Billboard Mexican Music Awards.

=== Weekly charts ===
Chart (2012)	Peak position
Mexican Albums (Top 100 Mexico)	24
US Top Latin Albums (Billboard)	4
US Regional Mexican Albums (Billboard)	1

=== Year-end charts ===
Chart (2012)	Peak position
US Top Latin Albums (Billboard)	41
US Regional Mexican Albums (Billboard)	15
