= Piel de Ángel =

Studio album by Lucero
- Released: 22 April 1997
- Recorded: 1996–1997
- Genre: Pop
- Label: Melody
- Producers: Claudio Guidetti, Maurizio Fabrizio

Lucero chronology
| 'Lazos de Amor' (1995) | Piel de Ángel (1997) | 'Cerca de Ti' (1998) |

Singles from Piel de Ángel
- 1. "Tácticas de guerra" Released: 15 December 1996; 2. "Quiero" Released: 5 March 1997; 3. "Toda la noche" Released: 31 May 1997; 4. "Piel de ángel" Released: 10 July 1997; 5. "Una vez más" Released: 10 September 1997

Piel de Ángel (Skin of Angel) is the thirteenth album from Mexican singer and actress Lucero. It was released in 1997.

For this album, the singer choose to work with Italian producers Claudio Guidetti and Maurizio Fabrizio to achieve a new sound on her music, since she had already three back to back ballad albums written and produced by Spanish songwriter Rafael Pérez-Botija.

Piel de Ángel was released just after Lucero's wedding with Manuel Mijares (one of the highest rated events in Mexico history), and was another successful recording for her, selling 600,000 copies only in her native country; rarely certify three gold records for their high sales.

Gerardo Flores wrote seven out of eleven tracks included on the project, including an adaptation of the "Il Postino" score, written by Luis Bacalov, by Lucero's request, since her mother was a big fan of the movie.

As usual for a first single for the singer albums, "Tácticas de Guerra" (War Tactics) and hit the No. 1 spot in Mexico and also the No. 13 on the Billboard Hot Latin Tracks chart.

The track "Si Tú Llegaras a Amarme" (If You Would Love Me) is the result of a contest in México for the soap opera "Lazos de Amor" (also starring Lucero).

"Quiero" (I Want) was released as second single reaching No. 8 in Mexico. The third single "Toda la Noche" (All Night Long) had a first video directed by Adolfo Pérez Butrón, the photographer behind almost every cover of the artist albums.

On her second live album Lucero En Vivo Auditorio Nacional the track "Historias de Amores" (Love Stories) and the single "Tácticas de Guerra" appears on the setlist.

== Track listing ==
The album is composed by 11 songs, all of them were arranged and produced by different composers.

| No. | Title | Writer(s) | Length |
|---|---|---|---|
| 1. | "La Vida Aquí Está" | D. Amerio, Cheope, Gerardo Flores | 03:42 |
| 2. | "Si Tú Llegaras a Amarme" | José Cantoral, Roxana de Antuñano | 03:08 |
| 3. | "Historias de Amores" | Claudio Guidetti, G. Flores | 04:14 |
| 4. | "Toda la Noche" | G. Flores | 03:32 |
| 5. | "Al Centro de Tus Ojos" | Gianni Casella, Antonello Oliveri, C. Guidetti, G. Flores | 04:21 |
| 6. | "Quiero" | Maurizio Fabrizio, Greg Duckie Morra, G. Flores | 03:46 |
| 7. | "Inventario" | S. Amato, Fabrizio Berlincioni, G. Flores | 04:06 |
| 8. | "Tácticas de Guerra" | Luis Cabañas, Miguel Gallardo | 03:39 |
| 9. | "Piel de Ángel" | L. Cabañas, M. Gallardo | 04:15 |
| 10. | "Si Me Extrañas" | Jorge Avendaño Lührs | 03:34 |
| 11. | "Una Vez Más" | Luis Bacalov, G. Flores | 02:56 |

== Singles ==
| # | Title | Mexico | United States Hot Lat. | United States Lat.Air | Argentina | Costa Rica | Colombia | Chile | Peru | Nicaragua |
|---|---|---|---|---|---|---|---|---|---|---|
| 1. | "Tácticas de guerra" | 1 | 13 | 2 | 2 | 1 | 3 | 8 | 1 | 1 |
| 2. | "Quiero" | #8 | n/a | n/a | 25 | n/a | 12 | n/a | 31 | 11 |
| 3. | "Toda la noche" | #16 | n/a | n/a | 10 | 1 | 5 | 1 | 2 | 1 |
| 4. | "Piel de ángel" | #2 | n/a | n/a | n/a | n/a | 15 | 9 | n/a | 6 |
| 5. | "Una vez más" | #10 | n/a | n/a | 13 | 5 | 10 | 3 | 2 | 1 |

== Chart performance ==
This was the 7th album of Lucero that entered to the list of Billboard and the last album of pop music to do so, until after 13 years later she entered with Indispensable. The album stayed in the chart of the Latin Pop Albums for 9 weeks, peaking #12; and it stayed in the Top Latin Albums for 13 weeks, peaking at No. 28.

| Chart | Peak Position |
|---|---|
| Top Latin Albums | 28 |
| Latin Pop Albums | 12 |

== Credits ==
=== Personnel ===
- Production: Claudio Guidetti and Maurizio Fabrizio from Destino SRL
- Recorded at: Studio L’isola (Milan, Italy) by Bruno Malasoma; Soundabout Studio (LA) by Claudio Guidetti and Rodolfo Vazquez.
- Strings recording: Olympic Studios (London) by Pete Lewis and Adam Brown
- Mixing: Studio L’isola by Bruno Melasoma and Claudio Guidetti
- Mastering: Nautilus (Milan) by Antonio Baglio
- Executive producer: Tina Galindo
- Production coordinator: Sylvia Cantarell
- Photography: Adolfo Pérez Butrón
- Wardrobe: Beatriz Calles, Sarah Bustani and Keko
- Graphic design: Varela design.

=== Musicians ===
- Drums: Elio Rivagli
- Bass: Flavio Scopaz
- Guitars, piano and keyboards: Claudio Guidetti and Maurizio Fabrizio
- Electric guitar: Andrea Braido
- Sax: Emanuele Cisi
- Backing vocals: Emanuela Cortesi, Monica Magnani, Claudio Guidetti and Maurizio Fabrizio
- Violin: Lucio Fabbri, Russel Gilbert and Mario de Monte
- Strings arrangement: Maurizio Fabrizio
