= List of Billboard Regional Mexican Albums number ones of 2012 =

Regional Mexican Albums is a record chart published in Billboard magazine that features Latin music sales information for regional styles of Mexican music. This data are compiled by Nielsen SoundScan from a sample that includes music stores, music departments at department stores and verifiable sales from concert venues in the United States.

== Number-one albums ==
Issue date	Album	Artist(s)	Reference(s)
January 7	Joyas Prestadas: Banda	Jenni Rivera	
January 14	Inténtalo	3Ball MTY	
January 21	Inténtalo	3Ball MTY	
January 28	Inténtalo	3Ball MTY	
February 4	Inténtalo	3Ball MTY	
February 11	Irreversible...2012	La Arrolladora Banda el Limon de Rene Camacho	
February 18	Irreversible...2012	La Arrolladora Banda el Limon de Rene Camacho	
February 25	Irreversible...2012	La Arrolladora Banda el Limon de Rene Camacho	
March 3	Irreversible...2012	La Arrolladora Banda el Limon de Rene Camacho	
March 10	Un Hombre Normal	Espinoza Paz	
March 17	Un Hombre Normal	Espinoza Paz	
March 24	Inténtalo	3Ball MTY	
March 31	Inténtalo	3Ball MTY	
April 7	30 Aniversario	Los Temerarios	
April 14	Lo Mejor de El Trono de Mexico	El Trono de México	
April 21	La Gritera	Los Inquietos del Norte	
April 28	La Gritera	Los Inquietos del Norte	
May 5	La Gritera	Los Inquietos del Norte	
May 12	Lo Mejor de El Trono de Mexico	El Trono de México	
May 19	Trankazos de Verano	Various Artists	
May 26	Trankazos de Verano	Various Artists	
June 2	Trankazos de Verano	Various Artists	
June 9	Trankazos de Verano	Various Artists	
June 16	Un Lu* Jo	Lucero & Joan Sebastian	
June 23	Viejitas Pero Buenas... Pa' Pistear	Los Horóscopos de Durango	
June 30	Viejitas Pero Buenas... Pa' Pistear	Los Horóscopos de Durango	
July 7	Viejitas Pero Buenas... Pa' Pistear	Los Horóscopos de Durango	
July 14	A Corazon Abierto	El Trono de Mexico	
July 21	Iconos: 25 Exitos	Los Bukis	
July 28	De Mil Maneras... Sin Limites	Conjunto Atardecer	
August 4	De Mil Maneras... Sin Limites	Conjunto Atardecer	
August 11	El Muchacho	Roberto Tapia	
August 18	El Muchacho	Roberto Tapia	
August 25	El Muchacho	Roberto Tapia	
September 1	El Muchacho	Roberto Tapia	
September 8	Mi Promesa	Pesado	
September 15	Mi Promesa	Pesado	
September 22	En Vivo	Julion Alvarez y Su Norteno Banda	
September 29	En Vivo	Julion Alvarez y Su Norteno Banda	
October 6	El Punto Exacto	Grupo Exterminador	
October 13	El Primer Ministro	Gerardo Ortíz	
October 20	El Primer Ministro	Gerardo Ortíz	
October 27	El Primer Ministro	Gerardo Ortíz	
November 3	El Primer Ministro	Gerardo Ortíz	
November 10	Radio Exitos: El Disco del Ano 2012	Various Artists	
November 17	Entregate	Tierra Cali	
November 24	Radio Exitos: El Disco del Ano 2012	Various Artists	
December 1	Banda #1's 2012	Various Artists	
December 8	Banda #1's 2012	Various Artists	
December 15	Banda #1's 2012	Various Artists	
December 22	Joyas Prestadas: Banda	Jenni Rivera	
December 29	La Misma Gran Señora	Jenni Rivera	
