= Keiko (song) =

Single by Lucerito
- Released: 1985
- Recorded: 1984−1985
- Genre: Pop
- Length: 5:36
- Label: Musart Records
- Producer(s): J.S Rosaldo

Lucerito singles chronology
"'Siempre te seguiré'" (1985)	"Keiko" (1985)	"'Era la primera vez'" (1986)

Keiko is a special single by Lucerito, dedicated to the orca Keiko that starred in the first of the three Free Willy movies. When the whale was sold to the Reino Aventura (now Six Flags México), the label of Lucerito decided to release this single due to the fame of the whale.

== History ==
Reino Aventura ("Adventure Kingdom" in English) was a park located in Tlalpan in Mexico City. It opened to the public in March 1982 as the biggest amusement park in Latin America. Keiko was purchased from Marineland in Ontario, Canada, and was one of the new attractions aimed to improve the park. To promote the whale and the park, the park administration made a contract with Musart Records, which released a special single with two songs about the whale. Musart Records had the best selling teen singer to carry out this agreement, Lucerito.

== Track listing ==
1. Keiko – 2:57
2. Keiko 3000 kilos de Amor – 2:38
