= Fiebre de amor (soundtrack) =

Soundtrack album by Luis Miguel and Lucerito
- Released: 1985
- Recorded: 1984–1985
- Genre: Pop
- Length: 39:51
- Label: EMI
- Producer: Luisito Rey

Luis Miguel chronology
Palabra de honor (1984)	Fiebre de amor (1985)	Soy Como Quiero Ser (1987)

Lucerito chronology
Con Tan Pocos Años (1984)	Fiebre de amor (1985)	Fuego y Ternura (1985)

Professional ratings
Review scores
Source	Rating
Allmusic	3/5 stars

Fiebre de amor ("Fever of love") is a soundtrack album from the Mexican film of the same title. It was released in 1985 on the EMI Capitol label. Most of the tracks are performed by Luis Miguel with a few interventions from Lucerito, his girlfriend on the motion picture. The soundtrack was also recorded in Italian.

== Track listing ==
#	Title	Composer	Time
1	Fiebre de Amor	Luis Rey	3:37
2	Acapulco Amor	Luis Rey	3:44
3	Por Ti	Honorio Herrero	3:42
4	Todo El Amor Del Mundo (Duet w/Lucerito)	Luis Rey	2:35
5	Este Amor	Luis Rey	3:12
6	Los Muchachos de Hoy (Italian Version)	Minellono/Cutugno	3:34
7	Fiebre de Amor (Instrumental)	Luis Rey	5:08
8	Siempre Me Quedo, Siempre Me Voy	Luis Rey	4:15
9	Sueños	Luis Rey	3:10
10	Siempre Te Seguiré (Only Lucerito)	Luis Rey	3:12
11	Los Muchachos de Hoy	Minellono/Cutugno	3:42

== Singles ==
#	Title	Mexican singles	Hot Latin Tracks
1.	"Los muchachos de hoy"	2	—
2.	"Todo el amor del mundo"	1	9
