= Regina (play) =

- Poster from Regina
- Music: Antonio Calvo
- Lyrics: Álex Slucki
- Book: Antonio Velasco Piña
- Premiere: 2003

Regina: Un Musical Para Una Nación Que Despierta (Regina: A musical for an awaking nation) is a Mexican musical composed by Antonio Calvo, with lyrics by Alex Slucki. It is based on the novel Regina (1987) by Antonio Velasco Piña.

== Production ==
The musical premiered on March 21, 2003 at the San Rafael Theater.

This show marked Lucero's first stage performance, taken after she rejected a role in the soap opera Amor real with director Carla Estrada.

== Synopsis ==
Regina was born from the union of Popocatépetl and Iztaccíhuatl volcanoes in the 50s. She is a dakini with supernatural powers inherited from the Dalai Lama, which allow her to dominate forces of nature. This is discovered by Tagdra Rimpoche, her mentor, along with the Dalai Lama, after performing some tests.

== Songs ==
1. Ciudad Inhumana
2. Digan Por qué
3. Hechizo de Luna
4. Lama La
5. Luz de mi verdad
6. Viva Regina
7. La Cárcel China
8. Gloria
9. No hay tiempo que perder
10. Libres
11. Amanecer
12. Con un solo pensamiento
13. Dinos por qué
14. Mira con los ojos de la esencia

== Cast ==
1. Lucero
2. Edgar Cañas
3. Ana Regina Cuarón
4. Jano
5. Enrique del Olmo
6. Danna Paola
7. José Roberto Pisano
8. Moisés Suárez
9. Alejandro Villeli

== See also ==
- Regina (album)
