= Los Chiquillos de la TV =

Compilation album by Various Artists
- Released: 1982
- Recorded: 1982
- Genre: Pop
- Label: Musart Records

Various Artists chronology
| Juguemos a Cantar (1982) | Los Chiquillos de la TV (1982) | América, Esta Es Tu Canción (1982) |

Los Chiquillos de la TV ("The little kids of the TV") is an album for children from the TV show "Chiquilladas". It was released on 1982.

== Track listing ==
1. Los Chicos de la TV (Todos)
2. Amárralo (Lucerito)
3. Sobre los Pizarrones (Chuchito)
4. Pituka y Petaka (Pituka y Petaka)
5. Juan el Descuartizador (Ginny)
6. Puras Chiquilladas (Todos)
7. El Chico Más Lindo del Mundo (Ginny)
8. Ella Es Chispita (Lucerito)
9. El Siglo XXX (Pituka y Petaka)
10. Niña (Chuchito)

== Singers ==
- Lucerito
- Chuchito
- Pituka & Petaka
- Ginny
