= Zapata: El sueño del héroe (soundtrack) =

Soundtrack album by Various Artists
- Released: May 11, 2004
- Genre: Soundtrack
- Length: 45:53
- Label: Sony Discos

Singles from Zapata: El sueño del héroe
- 1. "Lucharé por tu amor" Released: 2004

Zapata: El sueño del héroe is the soundtrack for the Mexican film Zapata: El sueño del héroe and was released in May 2004, to accompany the release of the film. The lead single was the song "Lucharé por tu amor" by Alejandro Fernández and reached the top ten of the Billboard Latin Pop Airplay chart.

== Track listing ==
1. Lucharé por tu amor performed by Alejandro Fernández – 4:47
2. Llanto performed by Celso Piña – 4:06
3. Igual que yo performed by Sin Bandera – 4:16
4. Esta vida performed by Tres De Copas – 3:54
5. Quédate en mi performed by Lucero – 3:32
6. La tierra de mi pueblo performed by Jaime Camil – 3:56
7. Morir para vivir performed by Ana Gabriel – 3:40
8. Tierra y libertad performed by Reyli Barba – 4:09
9. Zapata vive performed by Maria Maria (stage name of Maria Entraigues) – 3:25
10. El hombre de maíz (Instrumental) performed by Ruy Folguera – 4:10
11. Guerrero sagrado (Instrumental) performed by Ruy Folguera – 5:58

== Chart performance ==
Year	Chart	Track	Peak
2004	Billboard Latin Pop Airplay	Luchare Por Tu Amor	9
2004	Billboard Hot Latin Songs	Luchare Por Tu Amor	19
