= Un Nuevo Amor =

Un Nuevo Amor may refer to:

- Un Nuevo Amor (Lucero album), 2002
- Un Nuevo Amor (Daniela Romo album), 1994
- "Un Nuevo Amor", a Spanish version of the song "Hopelessly Devoted to You"
