= Electricidad (disambiguation) =

Electricidad is a 2009 album by Mexican duo Jesse & Joy.

Electricidad (English: Electricity) may also refer to:

- "Electricidad", a song by Los Abandoned from their EP Demotape
- "Electricidad", a song by Jesse & Joy from their album Electricidad, mentioned above
- "Electricidad", a song by Lucero, from her album Sólo Pienso En Ti
- "Electricidad", a song by Pérez Prado
- Electricidad, a Chicano adaptation by Luis Alfaro of Greek tragedy The Libation Bearers
- Mr. Electricidad, a character in The Adventures of Sharkboy and Lavagirl in 3-D

== See also ==
- Electricidad de Caracas
