= Cerca de ti (Lucero album) =

Cerca de Ti

Studio album by Lucero
- Released: 24 February 1998
- Recorded: 1997
- Genre: Mariachi
- Label: Melody
- Producer: Rubén Fuentes

Lucero chronology
| Piel de Ángel (1997) | Cerca de Ti (1998) | Un Lucero En La México (1999) |

Singles from Cerca de Ti
- 1. "Corazón lastimado" Released: 17 February 1998; 2. "A partir de hoy" Released: 28 April 1998; 3. "Desviste mi boca" Released: 6 June 1998; 4. "Te amaré toda la vida" Released: 30 October 1998

Cerca de Ti (Close to you) is the fourteenth album from Mexican singer and actress Lucero. It was released on 24 February 1998 and has sold more than 600,000 copies in Mexico.

This is the fourth album recorded by the singer with mariachi and is produced once again by Rubén Fuentes. The sales were strong in Mexico reaching double-platinum status. The title track was first released as a bonus track on her album Lucero, and was one of the songs written by Rafael Pérez-Botija for the soap opera Los Parientes Pobres.

The first single "Corazón Lastimado" (Broken Heart) was sent to radio to popular music and pop stations as well, reaching the Top Ten in México. The tracks "A Partir de Hoy" (Starting Today) (written by Húmberto Estrada, the author of another crossover hit: "Como Quien Pierde una Estrella" by Alejandro Fernández), "Cerca de Ti" (Close to You) and "Desviste mi Boca" (Undress my mouth) were also promoted as singles. Cerca de Ti was the last album recorded by Lucero on Melody (later Fonovisa) her record label since 1988.

== Reviews ==
When the album was released, it received generally positive reviews for example Stephen Thomas Erlewine from Allmusic.com stated that the combination of Rubén Fuentes and Lucero is excellent, where he pointed out that "the production is appealingly polished, and Lucero's performances are nuanced and affecting, making the record rank among her very best albums".

Professional ratings
Review scores
| Source | Rating |
|---|---|
| Allmusic | 4/5 stars |

== Track listing ==
The album is composed by 13 songs, all of them were arranged by different composers.

| No. | Title | Writer(s) | Length |
|---|---|---|---|
| 1. | "Me Estoy Volviendo Mujer" | José Alfredo Jiménez | 02:25 |
| 2. | "Desviste Mi Boca" | Húmberto Estrada | 03:09 |
| 3. | "Corazón Lastimado" | Rubén Fuentes, Isabel Leonor Cova | 03:24 |
| 4. | "Besos de Amor" | Rafael Torres, Oscar Lira | 02:16 |
| 5. | "¡Antojo!" | I. L. Cova, R. Fuentes | 02:04 |
| 6. | "Te Amaré Toda la Vida" | Enrique Coki Navarro | 03:06 |
| 7. | "No Vuelvas" | Fernando Martínez | 02:45 |
| 8. | "A Partir de Hoy" | H. Estrada | 03:57 |
| 9. | "El Milagro" | Felipe "Indio" Jiménez | 02:06 |
| 10. | "Será Que Estoy Enamorada" | David Beigdeber | 03:09 |
| 11. | "Cerca de Ti" | Rafael Pérez Botija | 03:33 |
| 12. | "Con Doble Cara" | Benjamín Sanchez Mota | 02:54 |
| 13. | "Porque Soy Mujer" | Armando Manzanero | 03:28 |

== Singles ==
| # | Title | Mexico | Hot Latin Tracks |
|---|---|---|---|
| 1. | "Corazón lastimado" | #7 | #32 |
| 2. | "A partir de hoy" | #11 | n/a |
| 3. | "Desviste mi boca" | #20 | n/a |
| 4. | "Te amaré toda la vida" | #23 | n/a |

== Chart performance ==
This was the 8th album of Lucero that entered to the list of Billboard and the last of her albums in general to hits the lists in United States, until after 12 years later she entered with Indispensable. The album stayed in the chart of the Latin Pop Albums for 4 weeks, peaking #29; and it entered in the Top Regional Mexican Albums, peaking at No. 12.

| Chart | Peak Position |
|---|---|
| Top Latin Albums | 29 |
| Top Regional Mexican Albums | 12 |

== Personnel ==
- Producer, arranger and director: Ruben Fuentes with Mariachi Vargas de Tecalitlan (Courtesy of Polygram México)
- Repertoire: Lucero LEon and Isabel Leonor Cova
- Executive producer: Tina Galindo
- Recorded at: Joel Solis Studios, México
- Recording engineer: Carlos Ceballos and Alex Sanchez
- Guitar on “Antojo”: Elias Torres
- Guitars on “Besos de Amor” and “A Partir de hoy”: Miguel Peña
- Arrangements on tracks 4 and 10: Eduardo Magallanes
- Arrangements on tracks 7 and 12: Pepe Martinez
- All vocals: Lucero
- Photography: Adolfo Pérez Butrón
- Design: Varela Design and Rafael Barbabosa
