= Con Mi Sentimiento =

Studio album by Lucero
- Released: 3 April 1990
- Recorded: 1989–1990
- Genre: Mariachi
- Label: Melody
- Producer: Rubén Fuentes

Lucero chronology
Cuando llega el Amor (1990)	Con Mi Sentimiento (1990)	Sólo Pienso En Ti (1991)

Singles from Con Mi Sentimiento
- 1. "Fíjate...Fíjate" Released: 4 March 1990; 2. "Mi fantasía" Released: 8 May 1990; 3. "Te tuve y te perdí" Released: 26 July 1990

Professional ratings
Review scores
Source	Rating
Allmusic	3.0/5 stars

Con Mi Sentimiento (English: With my love), released in 1990, is the seventh album from Mexican singer and actress Lucero, and her first album with mariachi music with the participation of Mariachi Vargas of Tecalitlan. Since Lucero was working in the Mexican soap opera "Cuando llega el amor" this album did not have any promotion, nevertheless the album went gold and platinum in Mexico, with sales of 250,000 copies, and it reached #9 in the Top Regional Mexican Albums in Billboard. Also represents the first time Lucero had a hit in the Hot Latin Tracks in United States as Lucero, with "Te Tuve y Te Perdi" peaking at #22. All the tracks were successful recordings of the Mexican group Los Bukis (written by Marco Antonio Solís). The album was the first collaboration between Lucero and Rubén Fuentes, who produced this album, Lucero de México, Cariño de Mis Cariños, among others. This is the first studio album under the name of "Lucero", since her previous albums were released under her diminutive form "Lucerito"

== Track listing ==
The album is composed by ten songs, all of them were composed by Marco Antonio Solís.

No.	Title	Length
1.	"Mi Fantasía"	3:20
2.	"Te Esperaré"	2:55
3.	"Yo Te Necesito"	2:54
4.	"Tu Cárcel"	3:14
5.	"Fíjate... Fíjate..."	2:57
6.	"Cómo Dejar de Amarte"	3:25
7.	"Te Tuve y Te Perdí"	2:25
8.	"Triste Imaginar"	3:22
9.	"Presiento Que Voy a Llorar"	2:42
10.	"Necesito de un Compañero"	3:24

== Singles ==
#	Title	Mexico	Hot Lat.
1.	"Fíjate...Fíjate"	#11	n/a
2.	"Mi fantasía"	n/a	n/a
3.	"Te tuve y te perdí"	#4	#12

== Chart performance ==
This was the first time ever that an album of Lucero entered to the list of Billboard in any category of music. The album made appearance only in the chart of the Top Regional Mexican Albums for nine weeks, two of them were in the top ten; entering and peaking at #9.

Chart	Peak
Billboard Regional Mexican Albums	9
