= Veleta =

Veleta may refer to:

- Veleta (NFL), El Alejo
- Veleta (Sierra Nevada), a mountain in Spain
- Veleta, song on the album Lucero
