= Deliciosa sinvergüenza =

- Film poster
- Directed by: René Cardona Jr.
- Written by: René Cardona Jr.
- Starring: Lucero; Pedro Romo; Paco Ibáñez
- Music by: Ricardo Carreón
- Distributed by: Buenavista
- Release date: 1990 (Mexico)
- Running time: 90 minutes
- Country: Mexico
- Language: Spanish

Deliciosa sinvergüenza (in English: Delicious rascal) is a 1990 Mexican comedy film directed by René Cardona Jr. and starring Lucero.

== Synopsis ==
Lucerito's ingenuity and ability to constantly transform and change into different people confuses three crazy international service agents who earnestly pursue the mischievous delinquent.

== Cast ==
- Lucero as Lucerito Romani
- Pedro Romo as Agent 43
- Pablo Ferrel as Agent 42
- Paco Ibáñez as Agent 41
- Norma Lazareno as Mother superior
- Elvira de la Fuente as Sister Luna

== Production ==
This is the second Cardona Jr. film in which Lucero plays a character named after her own nickname as a teenager singer, after Fiebre de amor in 1986.

== Distribution ==
This film was only released in Mexico and distributed direct-to-video.

== Soundtrack ==
Two songs from the album Cuéntame appear in the soundtrack.
