= Mi Secreto de Amor =

Studio album by Lucero
- Released: 6 December 2011
- Genres: Mariachi, mariachi-pop
- Label: Universal Music Latino
- Producer: Lucero

Lucero chronology
Indispensable (2010)	Mi Secreto de Amor (2011)	Un Lujo (2012)

Mi Secreto de Amor is the twentieth studio album released by Lucero on 6 December 2011.

== Track listing ==
No.	Title	Length
1.	"Secreto de Amor"	04:20
2.	"Me Voy a Quitar de En Medio"	02:58
3.	"A Puro Dolor"	03:20
4.	"Amargo Adiós"	03:44
5.	"Te Sigo Amando"	03:24
6.	"A Dios Le Pido"	03:46
7.	"Si No Te Hubieras Ido"	04:42
8.	"Potpurrí: Así Es la Vida/Suavemente/La Vida Es un Carnaval"	06:55
9.	"Costumbres"	04:08
10.	"Mi Bon-Bon"	03:12
