= Escápate Conmigo (soundtrack) =

Escapate conmigo

Soundtrack album by Lucerito
- Released: 1988
- Recorded: 1987
- Genre: Pop
- Label: Melody Records

Lucerito chronology
Un Pedacito de mí (1986)	Escapate conmigo (1988)	Lucerito (1988)

Escápate conmigo ("Run away with me") is a soundtrack album from the movie Escápate conmigo starring Lucerito and her ex-husband Manuel Mijares. It was released in 1988.

== Track listing ==
1. Un mundo mejor - 2:25
2. Refresco para dos - 2:37
3. Buen día - 3:14
4. Sueños - 3:26
5. Corazón aventurero 2:36
