= Alegrías de Mediodía =

- Starring: Lucerito
- Country of origin: Mexico

Production
- Running time: 30 minutes per episode

Original release
- Network: Canal de las Estrellas
- Release: 17 February 1980 – 1982

Alegrías de Mediodía (English Midday Happiness) is a TV show broadcast by Canal de las Estrellas between 1980 and 1982. It is a TV show aimed at a young audience, set in Mexico. It started on 17 February 1980, and was broadcast from Monday to Friday from 3:30 to 4 in the afternoon through the TV channel Canal de las Estrellas (The Star's Channel).

The format was child comedy, starring new children with talent that are still in the Mexican media. This was the first time ever Lucero starred on television. Other notable cast members include Chuchito, Usi Velasco, Ginny Hoffman, Aleks Syntek and Carlitos Espejel, among others.

Alegrias de Mediodia was also the first Televisa series to feature Aida Pierce, in the role of the teacher Doña Tecla. Within a year of the series' launch, Pierce joined the casts of La Carabina de Ambrosio and La Matraca, but she is better known as a regular on nine other television series, including Humor es...los Comediantes, which she would cohost from 2000-01 (reuniting her with Espejel) and Duelo de Pasiones, as well as a guest on many comedy and variety shows aired on the Televisa networks.
