= Lucero (album) =

Studio album by Lucero
- Released: 13 July 1993
- Recorded: 1992–1993
- Genre: Pop
- Label: Melody
- Producer: Rafael Pérez Botija

Lucero chronology
Lucero De México (1992)	Lucero (1993)	Cariño de Mis Cariños (1994)

Singles from Lucero
- 1. "Veleta" Released: 15 March 1993; 2. "Sobreviviré" Released: 20 June 1993; 3. "El número uno" Released: 13 July 1993; 4. "Los parientes pobres" Released: 12 October 1993; 5. "Si no podemos amarnos" Released: 28 November 1993; 6. "Cerca de ti" Released: 16 April 1994

Lucero is the tenth album from Mexican singer and actress Lucero. It was released on 1993 and is often cited as Veleta. This album was the first Lucero album released only on CD and cassette, without being printed on LP. It had two formats: a digipack special edition & and the normal case with the bonus tracks, selling 350,000 copies on the former and reaching half-million status with the later. It is estimated that in total have sold over 1 million copies, certified by two gold albums and one platinum.

The first single (and most successful) was "Veleta" (Vane), and the singer once again faced the challenge to remove Luis Miguel's "America, America" from the No. 1 spot in México. She accomplished that feat. "Veleta" is also her highest peak (along with Cuentame back in 1989) at the Billboard Hot Latin Tracks charts, hitting No. 2 on 1 May 1993. It was held off from No. 1 by La Mafia's Me Estoy Enamorando. The second single "Sobreviviré" (I Will Survive) also hit No. 1 in Mexico (and No. 8 in United States) and was dethroned from pole position by the single "Ayer" by Luis Miguel. In 2002, the track ranked fourth on the poll for the best all-time Spanish song in the United States by Univision.

The album was nominated for an Eres award in the Best Album category, which was awarded to "Aries" by Luis Miguel. All track were written and produced by Rafael Pérez Botija, including the bonus tracks written specifically for the soap opera Los Parientes Pobres. On her second live album Lucero En Vivo Auditorio Nacional the singles "Sobreviviré", "Veleta" and "El Número Uno" are included on the set-list.

== Track listing ==
- All songs written and arranged by Rafael Pérez Botija, including the bonus tracks.

Professional ratings
Review scores
Source	Rating
Allmusic	3/5 stars

No.	Title	Length
1.	"Pelele"	03:02
2.	"Veleta"	04:23
3.	"Si No Podemos Amarnos"	04:09
4.	"No Te Enamores De Un Perdedor"	04:31
5.	"Sobreviviré"	03:19
6.	"Eres"	04:09
7.	"Amor De Segunda Mano"	03:23
8.	"Una Más"	04:07
9.	"El Número Uno"	03:22
10.	"Chico Rico"	04:19

Bonus Tracks
No.	Title	Length
11.	"Los Parientes Pobres (Theme From Los Parientes Pobres)"	04:06
12.	"Cerca De Ti"	04:06

== Singles ==
#	Title	Mexico	United States Hot Latin	Costa Rica	Argentina	Chile	Colombia	Nicaragua	Venezuela	Guatemala
1.	"Veleta"	1	2	1	1	1	1	1	2	1
2.	"Sobreviviré"	1	8	1	1	1	1	1	1	1
3.	"El número uno"	5	22	3	8	7	9	1	10	2
4.	"Los parientes pobres"	10	—	10	17	20	10	3	10	6
5.	"Si no podemos amarnos"	9	—	14	30	25	19	11	—	16
6.	"Cerca de ti""	10	23	—	—	—	—	—	—	—

== Chart performance ==
This was Lucero's 4th disc to enter the Billboard chart. The album stayed on the Latin Pop Albums for seven weeks, with one of them in the top ten; peaking at number 10. It stayed on the Top Latin Albums for 13 weeks, peaking at No. 19.

Chart	Peak
Billboard Latin Pop Albums	10
Billboard Top Latin Albums	19

== Personnel ==
- Producer, arranger and guitars: Rafael Perez Botija
- Recording engineers: J.A. Alvarez Alija, Jose Antonio Alvarez Alija, Luis Carlos Esteban and Gerardo Lopez Haro
- Mixing: Oscar Clavel
- Guitars: Javier Catala
- Backing vocals: Lucero and Doris Cale
- Music coordination: “Rubato”, Mary Jamieson and Ingrid Prysbyl
- Photography: Adolfo Pérez Butrón
- Wardrobe: Alan Simancas
- Styling: Mike Salas
