= Un Lucero en La México =

Un Lucero en la México

Live album by Lucero
- Released: 18 November 1999 (Mexico)
- Recorded: June 19, 1999
- Genres: Pop, mariachi
- Label: Sony
- Producers: Antonio Hogaza & Jean Smit

Lucero chronology
Cerca de Ti (1998)	Un Lucero en la México (1999)	Mi Destino (2000)

Lucero live albums chronology
Un Lucero en La México (1999)	Lucero en Vivo Auditorio Nacional (2007)

Alternative cover
- 1st cover

Alternative cover
- 2nd cover

Singles from Un Lucero en la México
- 1. "Quiero" Released: 1 November 1999; 2. "Popurrí Juan Gabriel" Released: 24 December 1999

Un Lucero en la México is Lucero's first ever live recording. Recorded during her 1999 concert in the Plaza de Toros México. The album was a two-disc release, with the first being the pop/ballad music, and the second disc, all the mariachi songs. It was released on 18 November 1999. The sales eventually led to a gold status in Mexico.

== Track listing ==
The album is composed by 32 songs, divided into two discs, one for pop and the other one for rancheras.

Pop (Disc 1)
No.	Title	Length
1.	"Introducción"	02:23
2.	"Historias de Amores"	04:29
3.	"Tácticas de Guerra"	03:44
4.	"Veleta"	05:19
5.	"Una Vez Más"	05:03
6.	"Quiero"	04:36
7.	"Siempre Contigo"	04:56
8.	"Medley (Amor Secreto • Fuego Y Ternura • Tu Desdén • Corazón A La Deriva • Tanto)"	07:26
9.	"Sobreviviré"	05:40
10.	"Ya No"	03:16
11.	"Medley (Caso Perdido • Siempre Te Seguire • Millones Mejor Que Tú • Todo El Amor Del Mundo)"	05:52
12.	"Toda la Noche"	02:00
13.	"Piel de Ángel"	02:33
14.	"Cuéntame"	06:25
15.	"Vete con Ella"	08:30

Mariachi (Disc 2)
No.	Title	Length
1.	"Si Nos Dejan"	04:02
2.	"Que No Quede Huella"	03:17
3.	"Corazón Lastimado"	03:16
4.	"Se Me Olvidó Otra Vez"	02:54
5.	"El Milagro"	02:48
6.	"Popurrí (La Media Vuelta • Que Bonito Amor • Un Mundo Raro • No Volveré)"	07:21
7.	"Me Estás Quemando"	04:12
8.	"Y Volveré"	04:26
9.	"Desviste Mi Boca"	03:11
10.	"De Que Manera Te Olvido"	03:16
11.	"Amor Eterno"	05:26
12.	"Popurrí (El Noa Noa • En Esta Primavera • No Tengo Dinero • Será Mañana • El Noa Noa)"	06:15
13.	"Una Aventura"	03:27
14.	"Tristes Recuerdos"	05:56
15.	"Llorar"	03:02
16.	"Volver, Volver"	03:09
17.	"El Son de La Negra"	01:55

== Singles ==
#	Title	Mexico
1.	"Quiero (Live)"	#27
2.	"Popurrí Juan Gabriel"	#10

== Sales and certifications ==
Region	Certification	Certified units/sales
Mexico (AMPROFON)	Gold	75,000^{^}
^{^} Shipments figures based on certification alone.
