= Cariño de Mis Cariños =

Studio album by Lucero
- Released: 21 June 1994
- Recorded: 1993–1994
- Genre: Mariachi
- Label: Melody
- Producer: Rubén Fuentes

Lucero chronology
| Lucero (1993) | Cariño de Mis Cariños (1994) | Siempre Contigo (1994) |

Singles from Cariño De Mis Cariños
- 1. "Te acordarás de mí" Released: 1 March 1994; 2. "Me estás quemando" Released: 20 April 1994; 3. "Y volveré" Released: 21 June 1994; 4. "Qué te ganaste" Released: 11 August 1994; 5. "Cariño" Released: 16 December 1994

Cariño de Mis Cariños (Darling of My Darlings) is the eleventh album from Mexican singer and actress Lucero. It was released in 1994, and has sold 500,000 units in Mexico.

It is the third mariachi album of her career, and was produced once again by Rubén Fuentes. The track list is composed of seven covers and four original songs. The covers are: "Que Ironía" (It's Ironic) and "Corazón de Roca" (Heart of Stone) first released by Los Fresno; "Me Piden" (They Ask Me) and "Cariño" (Sweetie) by Los Baby's; "Y Volveré" (I'll Return) by Los Ángeles Negros, "Olvidarte... Nunca" (Forget You... Never) by Los Golpes, "Te Acordarás de Mi" (You'll Remember Me) by Los Brios and "Tú Nuevo Amor" (Your New Love) by Lucha Villa.

The first single released was "Te Acordarás de Mi" a No. 1 hit in Mexico. Also "Me Estás Quemando", "Y Volveré", "Que Te Ganaste", "Corazón de Roca" "Cariño" and "Cariño de mis Cariños" were issued as promo-singles.

The singer shot two videos for this album: "Y Volveré" and "Me Estás Quemando", both directed by Benny Corral.

This album was included on the Best Albums of 1994 by the Mexican magazine Eres, and also was the highest charted album of Lucero's career in the United States, hitting at number 13 of the Billboard Top Latin Albums, until the release of the 2010 album Indispensable which peaked at number four. In Mexico the album was certified platinum.

== Track listing ==
The album contains 12 songs, all of which were arranged by different songwriters.

| No. | Title | Writer(s) | Length |
|---|---|---|---|
| 1. | "Cariño" | Juan Escamilla | 02:33 |
| 2. | "Qué Te Ganaste" | Enrique Negrete Rincón | 03:21 |
| 3. | "Y Volveré" | Alain Barrière, Germaín de la Fuente | 03:19 |
| 4. | "Me Piden" | Gregorio Cortez | 02:15 |
| 5. | "Corazón De Roca" | Stefan Benz, Gabriel Luna de la Fuente, Louie Lasky, Paul Strand | 02:54 |
| 6. | "Olvidarte... Nunca" | Raúl Cordova | 02:37 |
| 7. | "Cariño De Mis Cariños" | Rubén Fuentes, Alberto Cervantes | 03:26 |
| 8. | "Me Estás Quemando" | Rafael Buendía | 02:04 |
| 9. | "Te Acordarás De Mí" | Victor Daniel | 03:09 |
| 10. | "Ya Quedamos" | Irma Cue, Isabel Leonor Cova | 03:10 |
| 11. | "Tú Nuevo Amor" | Enrique Coqui Navarro | 02:31 |
| 12. | "Qué Ironía" | Braulio Benitez | 02:47 |

== Singles ==
| # | Title | Mex. | Hot Lat. |
|---|---|---|---|
| 1. | "Te acordarás de mí" | 1 | n/a |
| 2. | "Me estás quemando" | 11 | 22 |
| 3. | "Y volveré" | 5 | n/a |
| 4. | "Qué te ganaste" | 21 | n/a |
| 5. | "Cariño" | 19 | n/a |

== Chart performance ==
This was the fifth album of Lucero to enter the list of Billboard. The album stayed in the Top Latin Albums chart for 26 weeks peaking at number 13, and it stayed in the Regional Mexican Albums chart for 19 weeks, 14 of which were in the top ten, entering at number 7 and peaking at number 2.

| Chart | Peak Position |
|---|---|
| Top Latin Albums | 13 |
| Top Regional Mexican Albums | 2 |

== Personnel ==
- Producer: Ruben Fuentes
- Engineer: Francisco Miranda
- Recorder: Carlos Nieto
- Studio: Polygram (Mexico) and Criteria (Miami, Flo)
- Mastering: Digital Diaxis II, Estudio 19
- Photography: Adolfo Pérez Butrón
- Mariachi: Vargas de Tecalitlan
