= Cuéntame (Lucerito album) =

Studio album by Lucerito
- Released: 5 June 1989
- Recorded: 1988–1989
- Genre: Pop
- Label: Melody
- Producer: J. R. Florez

Lucerito chronology
Lucerito (1988)	Cuéntame (1989)	Cuando llega el Amor (1990)

Singles from Cuéntame
- 1. "Madre" Released: 26 April 1989; 2. "Cuéntame" Released: 8 June 1989; 3. "Corazón a la Deriva" Released: 14 December 1989; 4. "Tanto" Released: 16 February 1990; 5. "Caso perdido" Released: 10 May 1990

Cuéntame (Eng: Tell me) is the sixth studio album released by Mexican singer and actress Lucerito. It was released in 1989. Most of the songs included on the album were used in the film Deliciosa Sinvergüenza (1990); the album also includes a cover of The Pet Shop Boys' "It's a Sin" titled "Hojas Secas". Cuéntame is one of the biggest sellers on the singer's career, and was the album that inicitated the transition from teenager, being the last album using the diminutive Lucerito.

Cuéntame was executive produced by Spanish producer Miguel Blasco and produced by José Ramón Florez, with Florez writing most of the tracks included. Five singles were released, included the title track which peaked at number 2 in the Billboard Hot Latin Tracks chart in the United States; "Corazón a la Deriva" (also a top-ten hit in the same chart), "Tanto", "Madre", and "Caso Perdido", were also used to promote the album.

== Background ==
Cuéntame coincided with the 10-year celebration of Lucero's career, and also was the album designed to show her mature stage. Although Melody, the record label, refused to change the diminutive Lucerito to Lucero, for marketing reasons, Cuéntame is the last album that carried the diminutive, closing "infant stage" of her career; Lucero's following release, Con Mi Sentimiento (1990) was the first album to achieve this. The singer recorded the album from January to March 1989, in Madrid, Spain, and Bologna, Italy, places where shed had the opportunity to meet some European countries for the first time. Executive producer Miguel Blasco, was commissioned to create the new image for the singer, including art design, clothing and music. J.R. Florez and Loris Ceroni were responsible for selecting and composing all the music and lyrics of the album along with Gian Pierto Di Felisatti. Blasco's idea was to show Lucero as a much more mature singer and with a stronger image (Lucero appears in the front cover in black leather with studs, heavy earrings and curly hair).

== Release ==
Melody decides to launch the album in the Mexican TV show Siempre en Domingo in June 1989. Cuéntame was Lucero's sixth full-length studio album. The album was first promoted by the track "Madre" in April 1989, but the lead single was the title track, which became a number-one hit in Mexico and peaked at number two in the Billboard Hot Latin Tracks chart in the United States; this single ranked in the list for the "Best 100 Songs of the '80s in Spanish" by TV network VH1. "Corazón a la Deriva" was selected as the third single, and peaked at number 8 in the Billboard Hot Latin Tracks chart. "Tanto" and "Caso Perdido" were also released as the fourth and fifth singles. The track "Me Gusta Tu Dinero" was used to promote the film Deliciosa Sinvergüenza (1990).

== Track listing ==
The album is composed by eleven songs and a bonus track for the Cd format, Cuando Llega el Amor from the telenovela of the same name.

No.	Title	Writer(s)	Length
1.	"Tanto"	Di Felisatti, José Ramón Florez	3:28
2.	"Esta Naciendo un Amor"	Gonzalo Benavides	3:28
3.	"Cuéntame"	J.R. Florez, Cesar Valle	3:28
4.	"Caso Perdido"	J.R. Florez, C. Valle	3:23
5.	"Tiempo de Amarte"	Miguel Blasco, Loris Ceroni, J.R. Florez	3:24
6.	"Me Gusta Tu Dinero"	J.R. Florez, C. Valle	3:10
7.	"Corazón a la Deriva"	J.R. Florez, C. Valle	3:51
8.	"Nada Duele Más Que Tu Ausencia"	J.R. Florez, C. Valle	3:38
9.	"Lento"	M. Blasco, L. Ceroni, J.R. Florez	3:57
10.	"Hojas Secas"	Neil Tennant, Chris Lowe, J.R. Florez, C. Valle	4:12
11.	"Madre"	D. Felisatti, J.R. Florez	4:12

Bonus Track
No.	Title	Writer(s)	Length
12.	"Cuando Llega el Amor"	Juan Carlos Nieto	3:15

== Charts ==
#	Title	Mexico	United States Hot Lat.	Costa Rica	Argentina
1.	"Madre"	#10	n/a	#20	#45
2.	"Cuéntame"	#1	#2	#1	#2
3.	"Corazón a la deriva"	#2	#8	#1	#5
4.	"Tanto"	#3	n/a	#1	#1
5.	"Caso perdido"	#8	n/a	#29	n/a

== Sales ==
Cuéntame surpassed Lucero's previous releases on sales, managing to shi. It manages to ship 400,000 units, being awarded a gold and platinum certification in Mexico. The album was a high seller in Costa Rica, Chile, Colombia, Venezuela, Guatemala, and the United States, countries which Lucero visited to promote it.
