= Cuando Sale un Lucero =

Studio album by Lucero
- Released: 20 October 2004
- Recorded: 2004
- Genre: Mariachi
- Label: EMI
- Producer: Homero Patron

Lucero chronology
Regina (2003)	Cuando Sale un Lucero (2004)	Quiéreme Tal Como Soy (2006)

Alternative Cover

Singles from Cuando Sale Un Lucero
- 1. "Vete Por Donde Llegáste" Released: 7 June 2004; 2. "Entre la Espada y la Pared" Released: 28 November 2004; 3. "El Cable" Released: 15 February 2005

Cuando Sale un Lucero is the seventeenth album from Mexican singer and actress Lucero. And her sixth album with mariachi. With this album Lucero changed label and is the first under the EMI contract. It was released on 20 October 2004 in Mexico where the sales reached gold status.

This album received the Orgullosamente Latino Award for Best Latin Album of the Year in 2005.

At the time, the album sold around 80,000 copies in Mexico, being certified as gold.

== Track listing ==
The album is composed by ten songs, all of them were arranged and composed by different composers.

No.	Title	Writer(s)	Length
1.	"Vete por donde llegaste (Jugo de piña)"	Domingo Rullo	3:39
2.	"Amanecí en tus brazos"	José Alfredo Jiménez	2:51
3.	"Pepe"	Daniel Lemetro	3:34
4.	"Entre la espada y la pared"	Ricardo Arjona	3:18
5.	"No llores"	Alberto Domínguez	2:59
6.	"Cielo rojo"	Juan Zaizar	3:47
7.	"El cable"	Mario Carniello, Karen Juantorena	3:25
8.	"Sé"	Darío Miranda	4:39
9.	"Libro abierto"	Fidel Valadez	2:39
10.	"Cuando sale la luna"	J. A. Jiménez	3:17

DVD Special Edition
No.	Title	Length
1.	"EPK Estudio de Grabación"
2.	"EPK Estudio Fotográfico"
3.	"Video Sesión Fotográfica"
4.	"Video Entre la Espada y la Pared"
5.	"Entre la Espada y la Pared (Ver. Edit)"
6.	"Entre la Espada y la Pared (Remix)"
7.	"El Cable – Ven Papi (Saxo Mix)"
8.	"El Cable – Ven Papi (Latin Mix)"
9.	"Vete por Donde Llegaste (Jugo de Piña Cumbia Mix)"
10.	"Vete por Donde Llegaste (Jugo de Piña Dapuntobeat Remix)"
11.	"Pepe (Cumbia Mix)"
12.	"No Llores (Dapuntobeat Radio Remix)"
13.	"No Llores (Dapunobeat Remix)"

== Singles ==
#	Title	Mexico	Chile	Honduras
1.	"Vete por donde llegaste"	1	5	10
2.	"Entre la espada y la pared"	11	15	10
3.	"El cable (Ven papi)"	26	16	25

== Sales and certifications ==
Region	Certification	Certified units/sales
Mexico (AMPROFON)	Gold	50,000^{^}
^{^} Shipments figures based on certification alone.

== Awards ==
Year	Region	Award	Category	Result
2005	Mexico	Orgullosamente Latino Award	Best Latin Album	Won
