= Sólo me faltabas tú =

Solo me faltabas tú

Studio album by Lucero
- Released: November 1, 2019
- Recorded: Melody Recording Mixing & Mastering Studio, Guamúchil, Sinaloa
- Genre: Banda sinaloense
- Length: CD 32:31 CD+DVD 1:01:45
- Labels: Fonovisa, Universal Music Latino
- Producer: Luciano Luna

Lucero chronology
Enamorada en vivo (2018)	Solo me faltabas tú (2019)	20y20 (2020)

Sólo me faltabas tú is the twenty-sixth studio album by Mexican singer and actress Lucero, released on November 1, 2019, by the record label "Fonovisa" in collaboration with Universal Music Latino. This is Lucero's third album in the Sinaloan banda category, and also the third produced by Luciano Luna. The songs in this album consist of six original tracks and others are covers of hits previously performed by other artists. With this album, along with the success of her previous albums, Lucero demonstrates her interest in continuing within the Sinaloan band genre.

The album was released in a standard version with 10 tracks, as well as in CD+DVD format with 19 tracks, and finally in a special edition containing 26 tracks, including collaborations with other artists such as Luciano Pereyra, Gerardo Ortíz, Luis Fonsi, and Carlos Rivera, some of which were promoted as singles for the album.

== Background ==
After the success of her two previous Sinaloan band albums, Enamorada con banda and Más enamorada con banda, Lucero, in collaboration with producer and composer Luciano Luna, decided to release a third album in the genre. Following the release of her fourth live album, Enamorada en vivo, and in celebration of her 39-year career, Lucero remained on tour with performances in Mexico and other Latin American countries such as the United States, Chile, Argentina, and Brazil. During her tour in Brazil, Lucero promoted her fifth live album, Brasileira en vivo.

In February 2019, Lucero, along with Banda Los Recoditos, announced that they were recording the song "Solo me faltabas tú," which would be the first single from Lucero's upcoming musical production. On July 31, after her successful concert at the Auditorio Nacional in Mexico City, Lucero, through her Twitter account, asked her fans to help name her next musical production. She gave the option of two possible names, "Solo me faltabas tú" and "Siempre enamorada," with the former being the selected name.

== Promotion ==
The album's first single, "Me deshice de tu amor," was released on May 3, 2019, accompanied by its "Sierreña version," and was well received by the public. The album's second single, "A través del vaso," a duet with Banda Los Sebastianes, was released on August 18, 2019, and also had a positive reception. The third single, "Siempre te necesito," a duet with Gerardo Ortíz, was released on October 11, 2019, and was well received by the public. The fourth and last single, "Solo me faltabas tú," a duet with Banda Los Recoditos, was released on November 1, 2019, the same day as the album, and became one of the most popular songs on the album.

== Singles ==
- "Me deshice de tu amor" / "Me deshice de tu amor (Sierreña version)" (May 3, 2019 / August 14, 2019)
- "A través del vaso" (with Banda Los Sebastianes) (August 18, 2019)
- "Siempre te necesito" (with Gerardo Ortíz) (October 11, 2019)
- "Solo me faltabas tú" (with Banda Los Recoditos) (November 1, 2019)

== Track listing ==
CD+DVD edition
No.	Title	Featured artists	Length
1.	"Me deshice de tu amor" ((Sierreña version))		3:00
2.	"No me dejes ir"		3:03
3.	"A través del vaso"	Banda Los Sebastianes	3:22
4.	"Quisiera ser"		3:20
5.	"Yo te necesito aquí"		3:36
6.	"Solo me faltabas tú"	Banda Los Recoditos	2:49
7.	"Lo siento, mi amor"		2:45
8.	"Mírame"		3:05
9.	"El peor de mis fracasos"		3:19
10.	"Que te perdone Dios"		3:11
11.	"Me deshice de tu amor"		3:00
12.	"No me dejes ir"		3:03
13.	"A través del vaso"	Banda Los Sebastianes	3:22
14.	"Quisiera ser"		3:20
15.	"Yo te necesito aquí"		3:36
16.	"Solo me faltabas tú"	Banda Los Recoditos	2:49
17.	"Lo siento, mi amor"		2:45
18.	"Mírame"		3:05
19.	"El peor de mis fracasos"		3:19
20.	"Que te perdone Dios"		3:11
21.	"Me deshice de tu amor" ((Music video))		3:00
22.	"A través del vaso" ((Music video))		3:22
23.	"Siempre te necesito" ((Music video))		3:13
24.	"Solo me faltabas tú" ((Music video))		3:09
25.	"Brasileira (Live)"		2:59
26.	"Me deshice de tu amor (Live)"		3:00
27.	"A través del vaso (Live)"		3:20
28.	"Siempre te necesito (Live)"		3:17
29.	"Solo me faltabas tú (Live)"		3:29
30.	"Brasileira"		3:00
Total length:			1:01:45
