= Regina (album) =

Studio album by Various
- Released: 2003
- Recorded: 2003
- Genre: Musical
- Label: Producciones Que Despiertan
- Producer: Antonio Calvo

Various chronology
| Un Nuevo Amor (2002) | Regina (2003) | Cuando Sale Un Lucero (2004) |

Regina: Un Musical Para Una Nación Que Despierta (English: Regina: A musical for an awaking nation) is a special album from 2003 released after the play of the same name. Its distribution was for Mexico.

== Track list ==
1. Ciudad inhumana - Company
2. Digan por qué - Jano
3. Hechizo de luna - Lucero, Enrique del Olmo, Alejandro Villeli, Edgar Cañas, José Roberto Pisano
4. Lama la - Danna Paola
5. Luz de mi verdad - Ana Regina Cuarón
6. Viva Regina - Danna Paola
7. La cárcel de China - Lucero, along with the women of the crew.
8. Gloria - Lucero
9. No hay tiempo que perder - Lucero, Enrique del Olmo, Alejandro Villeli, Edgar Cañas, José Roberto Pisano
10. Libres - Company
11. Amanecer - Lucero
12. Con un solo pensamiento - Lucero
13. Dinos por qué - Lucero, Enrique del Olmo, Alejandro Villeli, Edgar Cañas, José Roberto Pisano
14. Mira con los ojos de la esencia - Lucero, Jano, Enrique del Olmo, Alejandro Villeli, Edgar Cañas, José Roberto Pisano

== Performers ==
1. Lucero
2. Danna Paola
3. Edgar Cañas
4. Ana Regina Cuarón
5. Jano
6. Enrique del Olmo
7. José Roberto Pisano
8. Moisés Suárez
9. Alejandro Villeli
