= Con Tan Pocos Años =

Studio album by Lucerito
- Released: 18 January 1984
- Recorded: 1983
- Genre: Pop
- Label: Musart
- Producer: Sergio Andrade

Lucerito chronology
América, Esta Es Tu Canción (1982)	Con Tan Pocos Años (1984)	'Disco Mensaje' (1984)

Singles from Con Tan Pocos Años
- 1. "Música" Released: 24 October 1983; 2. "Con Tan Pocos Años" Released: 16 January 1984; 3. "Contigo" Released: 29 May 1984

Con Tan Pocos Años (English: With so few years) is the second album from Mexican singer and actress Lucerito. It was released on 1984. Its first single was "Música", which was the song with which she participated in the 12th Mexican national selection for the OTI Festival. Once again, it was produced by Sergio Andrade through Musart Label.

== History ==
In 1983 Sergio Andrade wrote all the songs on the second album Con Tan Pocos Años, which included the song of the same name that would come to the top of popularity and sales and would make the young artist a star of magnitude. The novelty and originality of the arrangements, and the theme of the lyrics of songs by Andrade, made Lucerito the young star of excellence in those years and became a symbol for children and adolescents.

This second album was recorded entirely in Los Angeles, California, the main studio used by Mr. Andrade was Skyline Recording in Topanga Canyon, and where Andrade mixed Lucerito vocals.

== Track listing ==
The album is composed by ten songs, all of them were arranged, directed and produced by Sergio Andrade, except where it's indicated.

No.	Title	Writer(s)	Length
1.	"Con Tan Pocos Años"	Sergio Andrade	3:08
2.	"Lo que Daría"	S. Andrade	2:51
3.	"Contigo"	S. Andrade	3:12
4.	"Si Me Vas a Hacer Sufrir"	S. Andrade	2:56
5.	"Música"	Lucero Hogaza	3:00
6.	"Llévame"	S. Andrade	2:55
7.	"Cuando me Quieras"	S. Andrade	2:55
8.	"Te Quiero Porque Sí"	S. Andrade	3:26
9.	"Pirinola"	S. Andrade	3:07
10.	"Acción"	S. Andrade	2:38

== Singles ==
- Música: a soft song that represents the importance of the music for a singer.
- Con tan pocos años: a love song, that escapes to a simple classification, and it became a first place of sales and popularity since it expresses the female feelings of any teenager who has fallen in love with an older man.
- Contigo: a rhythmic theme in which the singer expresses the importance that represents the closeness of her lover.

=== Controversy ===
Sergio Andrade introduced Lucerito as a participant in the 12th Mexican national selection for the OTI Festival with the song "Música". Although in the competition the name that appeared in the song as the songwriter was the one of Lucerito, this was a general comment to suppose that the song was actually written by Andrade himself, since some gossips speculate that he was in love with the teenager so he gave her the song away. The song did not make it past the qualifying rounds.

#	Title	B-side	Date
1.	"Música"	"Hola... Amigos del Espacio" (From Él album)	1983
2.	"Con tan pocos años"	"Te quiero porque sí"	1984
3.	"Contigo"	"Acción"	1984

== Personnel ==
- Guitar: Grant Geissman
- Bass: Jimmy Johnson
- Drums: Ed Greene and Tom Breckline
- Pianos and Synthesizers: Sergio Andrade
- Strings: Gary Gertzweig
