= Cuando Llega el Amor (soundtrack) =

Soundtrack album by Lucero
- Released: 1990
- Recorded: 1988−1990
- Genre: Pop
- Label: Melody Records

Lucero chronology
Cuéntame (1989)	Cuando Llega el Amor (1990)	Con Mi Sentimiento (1990)

Singles from Cuando Llega el Amor
- 1. "Cuando llega el Amor" Released: 1990

Cuando Llega el Amor ("When love arrives") is a special album from the telenovela of the same name, starred by Lucero and Omar Fierro. This album consists of three previously released songs and a new song "Cuando llega el amor", theme from the soap opera. It was released in 1990.

== Track listing ==
1. Cuando Llega El Amor - 3:15
2. Vete Con Ella - 3:42
3. Cuéntame - 3:35
4. Millones Mejor Que Tú - 3:11
5. Así - 4:17
6. Arráncame La Vida - 2:36
7. Esperaremos El Año Nuevo - 3:07
8. También Para Ti Es Navidad (Ft. La Hermandad) - 3:22

== Singles ==
#	Title	Mexico	Puerto Rico	Costa Rica	Argentina
1.	"Cuando llega el amor"	1	1	1	1
