= Un Pedacito de Mí =

Studio album by Lucerito
- Released: 25 November 1986
- Recorded: 1985–1986
- Genre: Pop
- Label: Musart
- Producers: Jaime Sánchez Rosaldo; Luigi Lazareno; Javier Alurralde

Lucerito chronology
Fuego y Ternura (1985)	Un Pedacito de Mí (1986)	Escápate Conmigo (1988)

Singles from Un Pedacito De Mí
- 1. "Era la primera vez" Released: 4 August 1986; 2. "Como música de Rock'n'Roll" Released: 25 March 1987; 3. "Vendrá" Released: 9 October 1987

Un Pedacito De Mí (Eng. A little piece of me) is the fourth album from Mexican singer and actress Lucerito. It was released on 1986. In this album, it can be found the collaboration of the popular Mexican singer Luis Miguel with the song "Todo el Amor del Mundo", which was part of the soundtrack of the motion picture Fiebre de amor.

== Track listing ==
No.	Title	Length
1.	"Vendrá"	3:05
2.	"Si me lo pides tú"	3:00
3.	"Sucedió"	3:16
4.	"Como música de Rock'n'Roll"	3:24
5.	"Era la primera vez"	3:13
6.	"No sé vivir sin ti"	3:13
7.	"Hasta mañana"	2:48
8.	"Y cuando él llegó"	2:51
9.	"Díganle por favor"	3:51
10.	"Todo el amor del mundo"	2:44

== Singles ==
#	Title	B-sides	Mexico	United States Hot Lat.
1.	"Era la primera vez"	-	5	17
2.	"Como musica de Rock'n'Roll"	-	14	-
3.	"Vendrá"	"Todo el Amor del Mundo "	-	-

== Sales ==
The album has sold 300,000 units thus far, 60,000 of which have been sold in Mexico.
