= Lucero en Concierto =

2013 live album by Lucero

Lucero en Concierto: Sus Mas Grandes Exitos en Vivo

Live album and video by Lucero
- Released: 19 November 2013
- Recorded: 25 October 2012
- Genres: Pop, mariachi
- Label: Universal Music Latino
- Producer: Lucero

Lucero chronology
Un Lujo (2012)	Lucero en Concierto: Sus Mas Grandes Exitos en Vivo (2013)	Aquí Estoy (2014)

Lucero live albums chronology
Lucero en Vivo Auditorio Nacional (2007)	Lucero en Concierto (2013)	Enamorada en Vivo (2018)

Lucero video chronology
Lucero en Vivo Auditorio Nacional (2007)	Lucero en Concierto (2013)	Aquí Estoy (2014)

Lucero en Concierto: Sus Mas Grandes Exitos en Vivo is a live album released by Lucero on 19 November 2013. A DVD is also featured with the album.

== Track listing ==
No.	Title	Length
1.	"No Pudiste Amar Así"	03:18
2.	"Te Deseo lo Mejor"	03:23
3.	"Indispensable"	03:08
4.	"Electricidad"	03:51
5.	"Popurri Telenovela"	05:18
6.	"Veleta"	04:08
7.	"Popurri Niña"	04:01
8.	"Cuentame"	04:24
9.	"Vete con Ella"	03:27
10.	"No Me Dejes Ir"	03:46
11.	"Si Nos Dejan"	02:20
12.	"Tu Carcel"	03:14
13.	"Mi Ciudad"	03:54
14.	"Popurri José Alfredo Jiménez"	07:26
15.	"Tristes Recuerdos"	03:39
16.	"Aca Entre Nos"	03:20
17.	"Popurri Juan Gabriel"	05:50
18.	"Llorar"	02:47

== DVD ==
No.	Title	Length
1.	"No Pudiste Amar Asi"
2.	"Te Deseo lo Mejor"
3.	"Indispensable"
4.	"Electricidad"
5.	"Popurri Telenovela"
6.	"Veleta"
7.	"Popurri Niña"
8.	"Cuentame"
9.	"Vete con Ella"
10.	"No Me Dejes Ir"
11.	"Si Nos Dejan"
12.	"Tu Carcel"
13.	"Mi Ciudad"
14.	"Popurri José Alfredo Jiménez"
15.	"Tristes Recuerdos"
16.	"Aca Entre Nos"
17.	"Popurri Juan Gabriel"
18.	"Llorar"
