= Lucero (entertainer) =

Mexican singer, actress (born 1969)

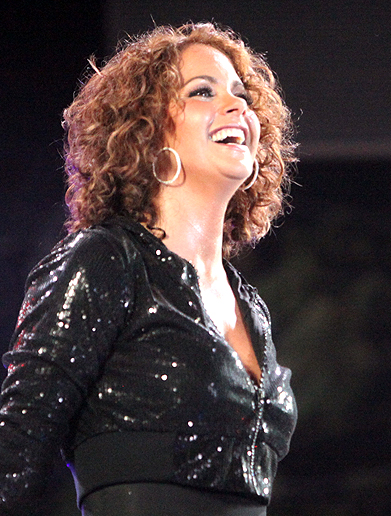
- Lucero in 2011
- Born: Lucero Hogaza León; 29 August 1969 (age 57); Mexico City, Mexico
- Other names: Lucerito; Americas' Girlfriend
- Occupations: Singer, actress
- Years active: 1980–present
- Spouse: Manuel Mijares (m. 1997; div. 2011)
- Children: 2
- Musical career
- Genres: Latin pop; dance pop; regional Mexican
- Instrument: Vocals
- Labels: Fonovisa; Sony; EMI
- Website: Official website

Lucero Hogaza León (Note: Pronounced Spanish pronunciation: [luˈseɾo]) (born 29 August 1969) is a Mexican singer, actress, and television personality. Dubbed "the Americas' Girlfriend", (Note: In Spanish-speaking countries, "América" means all of the Americas, both North and South. Lucero's nickname, "La novia de América", has this broader meaning, which does not refer to just the United States.) she is known for her influence in Latin music and Latin American television, with a career spanning over four decades. She started her career at age ten as a child actress on Televisa shows such as Alegrías de Mediodía, Chiquilladas, and later starred in Chispita. In 1982, she debuted as a singer with Él and soon became one of the most popular teen pop stars of the 1980s. Her albums from that time include Un Pedacito de Mí (1986), Ocho Quince (1988), and Cuéntame (1989).

During the 1990s, she starred in successful telenovelas such as Cuando Llega el Amor (1990), Los Parientes Pobres (1993), and Lazos de Amor (1996). At the same time, she released Latin pop albums such as Sólo Pienso en Ti and Piel de Ángel. She also became known for singing ranchera music, with albums such as Lucero de México (1992) and Cariño de Mis Cariños (1994). Lucero voiced Jane in the Spanish-language version of Disney's Tarzan (1999) and sang the Spanish version of "Reflection" for Mulan (1998). From 1997 to 2004, she was the host of Teletón México, one of the country's biggest charity TV events.

In the 21st century, she released more albums, such as Mi Destino (2000) and Quiéreme Tal Como Soy (2006). She starred in hit telenovelas such as Mi Destino Eres Tú (2000), Alborada (2005), and Soy tu Dueña (2010). Lucero also hosted the Latin Grammy Awards between 2006 and 2013 and the first two Latin American Music Awards. In 2011, she became a coach on the first season of the singing show La Voz. Lucero is considered one of the best-selling Latin artists, with over 16 million records sold worldwide. She has won many awards, including a Billboard Music Award and 21 Premios TVyNovelas. She has received honors such as the Hispanic Television Summit's Outstanding Achievement Award. In 2025, Billboard named Lucero one of the greatest female Latin pop artists of all time.

== Early life and career ==
=== 1980s ===
Lucero is the daughter of a Mexican mother, Lucero León, and a Spanish father, Antonio Hogaza.

She began her career in 1980. As a child, she was unsure about becoming an artist. At age 10, Televisa offered her the opportunity to appear in a juvenile-themed program named Alegrías de Mediodía (Midday Happiness), alongside several other young performers in music and comedy, such as Aida Pierce and Aleks Syntek.

She combined work with her academic studies, also taking singing and dancing lessons. During that time, she also performed in the program Juguemos a Cantar (Let's play to sing), in which she sang the main theme. Shortly after, she received several offers, among them for the children's series Chiquilladas (Childishness), making her first starring appearance. On the program, one of her more memorable roles was in a Popeye skit, portraying Olive Oyl.

In 1982, Lucero appeared in her first telenovela, Chispita (Little spark), costarring with such actors as Enrique Lizalde and Angélica Aragón, among others. Although she was known as a singer, Lucero did not sing the theme song for Chispita. Lucero earned two awards for her acting: the first TVyNovelas Award and an Azteca de Oro Award. With these accolades, Raúl Velasco invited Lucero to perform and record the main theme of the musical pageant América, Esta Es Tu Canción (America, this is your song). In 1982, she released her first album through Musart Records, titled Él (Him).

In 1983, she participated in the 12th Mexican national selection for the OTI Festival with the song "Música", not making it past the qualifying rounds. In 1985, Lucero was cast in her third film, Fiebre de amor (Love Fever), starring alongside Luis Miguel. The film was a commercial success and received two Diosa de Plata awards, including Breakthrough Performance, for Lucero's role.

Lucero performed two songs on the soundtrack; and, due to the favourable outcome of the film, the soundtrack also had a special edition for Italy. In this same year, at the suggestion of her mother, Lucerito left her mentor from the first two albums, Sergio Andrade. The music company then released another album without his guidance, providing her with different producers and composers, among them Joan Sebastian and Jaime Sánchez Rosaldo.

In 1986, she recorded Un Pedacito de Mí (A little piece of me), her fourth and last album with Musart Records. In order to get away from the shadow of Sergio Andrade's management, she signed with Melody Records that same year. Due to the departure of the singer to another company, Musart did not promote this album, which resulted in sales lower than her previous albums. Her single "Era la primera vez" ("It was the first time"), was a hit on Mexican charts, reaching the top 10 and the top 20 in Billboard. In 1986, she was also cast in her first theater role, in the play Don Juan Tenorio, playing Doña Inés de Ulloa.

Ending the decade, she had established herself as one of the best singers in Latin America and the United States. She continued her ascent, releasing her sixth studio album Cuéntame. The sales of the album reached gold and platinum status in Mexico. This album opened markets in the U.S., Spain, Guatemala, Costa Rica, Honduras, Panama, and all of South America. The title single became a number-one hit in Mexico, Costa Rica, Colombia, Brazil, and Guatemala, among other countries. The same song was included on the VH1 list "Best 100 Songs of the 80s in Spanish".

This was the last album she released under the name Lucerito. During this year, Procter & Gamble hired her to be the central image of their Head & Shoulders shampoo campaign for Latin America.

=== 1990s – from Rancheras to Piel de Ángel ===
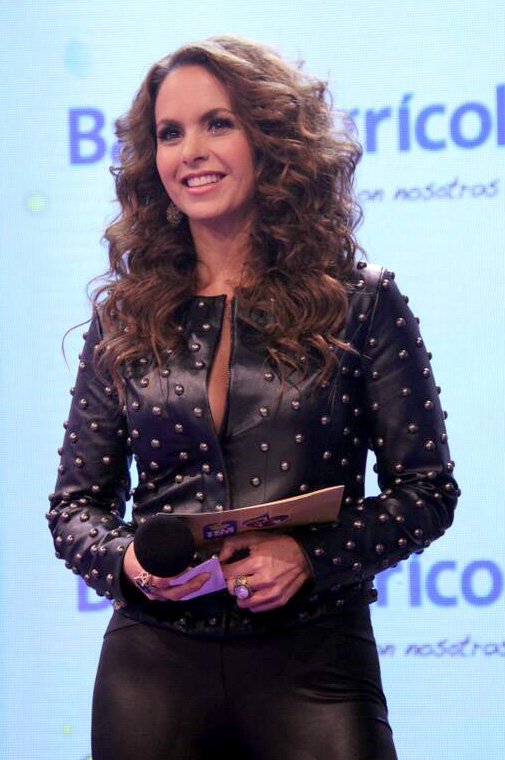
Lucero (2016)

Lucero left the 1980s with a solid career in which she was recognized as one of the best singers of the decade. In 1990, Lucero starred in her first telenovela as an adult, Cuando llega el amor where she also sang the theme song. This telenovela earned her the TVyNovelas Award for Best Actress. Melody Records released a special EP called Cuando llega el Amor, a huge hit in Latin America and reaching the top five in several countries. In the same year, after appealing to the youth market with a ballad, Lucero opened a new facet in her career with mariachi genre music, performing cover versions of the hits of Los Bukis on her album Con Mi Sentimiento, produced by the composer Rubén Fuentes.

Her performances abroad earned her a strong reputation as a Mexican singer in Latin America, Spain, and the United States, gaining her the nicknames of Lucero de México and La Novia de América (The Bride of America). She appeared in her sixth film, Deliciosa Sinvergüenza (Delicious rascal).

In 1991, she released Sólo Pienso en Ti, which achieved gold and platinum status in Argentina, Chile, and Mexico. Five singles were released, becoming big hits on Billboard charts, and in Mexico, Spain, and Latin America. The first single was "Electricidad" ("Electricity"), which reached the peak position in 10 countries and the top 5 in the US.

In the same year, she received five awards for Best Singer for her work on Con mi Sentimiento. In 1992, she was selected as Queen of Viña del Mar Festival at the Viña del Mar International Song Festival. She returned to the ranchera genre with the album Lucero de México, once again produced by Rubén Fuentes. The promotion of the album was big, since her first ranchera album had not been well promoted. Sales achieved gold status in Central America and Chile. In Mexico, they reached double platinum, becoming one of the best selling albums of ranchera music.

She was a recipient of a special accolade in the TVyNovelas Awards as Best Legs in the Mexican Media. During the year she was designated the singer with the most international appeal by the critics. In 1993, Lucero received a nomination for the Lo Nuestro Awards for Female Regional Mexican Artist of the Year.

In 1994, Lucero released another ranchera album, Cariño de Mis Cariños, her third album of this genre and also produced by Rubén Fuentes. The album was selected as one of the best albums of the year according to Eres magazine in Mexico. The album earned platinum status in that country.

At the end of 1994, she released her album Siempre Contigo, produced by Rafael Pérez Botija. The album achieved gold status in Mexico and high sales in Central America. From the album, five singles were released, reaching the top of the lists: "Siempre contigo" was her only song so far to reach the number one position in the US. For the Lo Nuestro Awards of 1996, Lucero was nominated for Pop Female Singer and Video of the Year for "Palabras", directed by Fernán Martínez.

In mid-1995, she performed in the soap opera Lazos de Amor in which she played triplets. The telenovela topped the TV ratings, and she also received several awards, among them those from TVyNovelas, El Heraldo, Eres, Diosa de Plata, all for best actress. Melody released the soundtrack of the telenovela Lazos de Amor with good sales and good airplay throughout Latin America and the United States. During 1995, Lucero sang two new songs on a UNICEF album, El Nuevo Sol, to raise funds for children, sharing credits with Pandora and Magneto. Apart from this participation, she made two more special appearances, in the album Boleros:Por amor y desamor and a duet with Mijares on the live album El Encuentro, which received high rotation on radio in the U.S. and Latin America, reaching the top ten lists.

In 1997, she returned to the music scene after an extensive tour throughout Latin America and the United States, with the album Piel de Ángel (Skin of Angel), her first studio album in almost three years. Its singles "Tácticas de Guerra", "Toda La Noche", and "Quiero" were popular with audiences and earned the album gold and platinum certifications for its sales in Mexico and the United States.

In 1997, Lucero married the singer Manuel Mijares. They had two children. The wedding was called "the event of the year" and it was broadcast through Televisa to Latin America. The ceremony was held in the chapel of San Ignacio de Loyola Vizcaínas High School.

In October 1997, she was invited to sing to Pope John Paul II during the II World Meeting of Families in Maracana stadium in Rio de Janeiro. The opportunity was, in Lucero's own words, the most emotional experience of her spiritual and professional life.

In December 1997, she captivated the Mexican public and other countries to lead the Telethon in Mexico for 27 hours non-stop to raise money for care and rehabilitation centers for disabled people. She continued to host the event in later years. From 1997, Radio Móvil Dipsa used Lucero as the new image for its mobile campaign with Telcel. She made television spots promoting rates, coverage, cellular models, and wireless internet. Sales increased, and her contract was renewed until 2000.

She received the Billboard Music Award for Best Ranchera Album. Also during this year, she collaborated in the soundtrack of Mulan, which was nominated for the Best Original Musical or Comedy Score Oscar, singing the song "Reflejo". In this production she shared credits with Cristian Castro and Christina Aguilera. At the end of the 1990s, the event Un Lucero en La México took place in the Plaza de Toros México, bringing together more than 40,000 people who chanted Lucero's hits and gathered to celebrate her 20th anniversary as a singer and actress, in a concert of nearly three hours. She recorded her first live album that sold more than 200,000 copies.

During 1999, she participated in the Latin American Spanish dub of the Walt Disney Pictures film Tarzan, performing the voice of Jane Porter. Also in 1999, Banamex (Mexico's largest bank) chose Lucero to be the main image of the TV spot celebrating its 100 years of existence, for Mexico only.

=== 2000s – from Mi Destino to second live album ===
The new millennium started with new contracts. In early 2000, Lucero and singer Chayanne were employed by PepsiCo to promote Doritos and Pepsi products. Together they did a TV spot and several ads that were promoted throughout the Latino community in the United States. Also during this year, AT&T signed a contract with Lucero to be the main face to offer special rates for long-distance calls to Latino families in the United States, where she sang an area code in several spots. In 2002 and 2003, the contract remained in force, so the company had printed some ads with her image that were published throughout the United States and for private concerts.

In 2000, she recorded the album Mi destino (My Destiny) for the Sony Music International. The album was produced by Rafael Pérez Botija, Ric Wake, and Jimmy Greco, and included two songs in English. She starred in the telenovela Mi Destino Eres Tú (My destiny is you), produced again by Carla Estrada, with a cast including Jacqueline Andere, Silvia Pasquel, Julio Alemán, and María Sorté. The telenovela achieved high ratings. This performance earned her an award as Best Lead Actress in a telenovela.

In 2001, she made a special appearance in Mijares's concert for his second live album. That year, she received the Silver Seagull award at Chile's Viña del Mar International Song Festival as favorite singer.

In February 2002, she began promoting the album Un Nuevo Amor (A new love), a ranchera production under the supervision of three major producers, Rubén Fuentes, Estéfano Salgado, and Homero Patrón. This album was the first ranchera music for Sony Music. At this time, she sought to participate in 3 studio albums: Huey Dunbar's, Gabriel Navarro's, and a special tribute to Selena. In June, Lucero received the Double Eagle Leadership Award from the Chamber of Commerce of Mexico and the United States at a gala celebrated in Coral Gables, Florida, for her commitment to building stronger relations between the United States and Mexico, presented by the TV host Don Francisco.

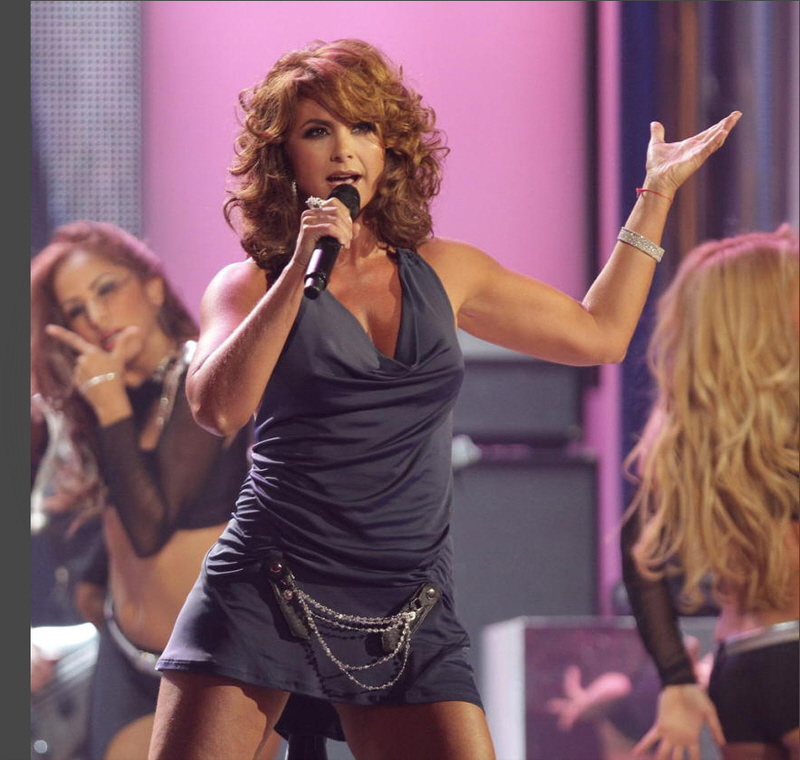
Billboard at the Latin Music Awards in 2011

In early 2003, Lucero was invited by PepsiCo to be the main image of the new product Sabritas for Mexico. With only three TV spots and ads the company managed to sell more than expected, so Lucero was recognized with an award and was invited to be the image of the 60th anniversary of Sabritas, singing the official jingle A Que No Puedes Comer Sólo Una (You can't eat just one).

Throughout 2003, she starred in the musical adaptation of the book by Antonio Velasco Piña, a musical that tells another version of what happened on 2 October 1968, in Tlatelolco. Lucero decided to take this play since she rejected participating in the telenovela Amor real. After the musical's several months in theaters, she received an award for best actress in a musical and had 100 performances with 100 standing ovations from the audience. Critics and reporters who were reportedly hostile to the actress created a situation whereby, when the plaque for the 100th performance was shown, television reporters insisted on having an interview with the actress and tried to follow her, only to have a security guard draw his gun against them. She defended the acts of her guard which led to her being removed from hosting the annual telethon for several years.

In August 2003, she filmed the role of Esperanza Alcalá in Zapata: El sueño de un héroe (Zapata: The dream of a hero) by Alfonso Arau, starring Alejandro Fernández, with cinematography by Vittorio Storaro and art direction and costumes by Eugenio Zanetti. She participated in the soundtrack of the movie with one song named "Quédate en mí" ("Stay in me"). In the fall of 2003, she signed a contract with Fuller Cosmetics to promote her own perfume line within the company.

In 2004, her album Cuando Sale un Lucero (When a star comes out) was released by EMI Music Mexico. It was a new ranchera album again produced by Ruben Fuentes and Homero Patrón. The album achieved gold record status and it was released in a special edition. That same year she returned to telenovelas, now with a part in Alborada (Dawn) where the story takes place in the 1800s and where she played María Hipólita Díaz alongside Fernando Colunga, Daniela Romo, and others.

After her role in this soap opera that lasted until 2005, Lucero began to record her next album in early 2006. She released Quiéreme Tal Como Soy (Love Me As I Am) in September 2006, where she pays tribute to Rafael Pérez Botija, the composer and producer of her biggest hits. With this record she achieved strong sales thanks to the singles "La Única Que Te Entiende" ("The One who understands you") and "O Tú O Nada" ("Either you or nothing"). In November 2006, she hosted for the first time the 7th Latin Grammy ceremony; since then, she has participated as a host five times so far. As a result of the good sales of Quiéreme tal como soy, the company decided to make a concert in the National Auditorium in March 2007, recording an album completely live that achieved high sales on CD and DVD formats. This was her second and last live album to be released to the public.

On 20 October 2008, the telenovela Mañana es para siempre (Tomorrow Is Forever) was released; it was produced by Nicandro Diaz. This soap opera had a primetime broadcast where Lucero starred as Bárbara Greco, the villain of the story; this was her second antagonist role since her well-received character María Paula in Lazos de Amor in 1996. She shared credits alongside actors such as Silvia Navarro, Fernando Colunga, and Sergio Sendel. The ratings were high, reaching 51 points in its final, two-hour episode. Due to its popularity, Procter & Gamble invited Lucero to be the face and spokesperson for a line of creams and Olay beauty products. Year after year, the cosmetics company has renewed its contract with Lucero, even using her image on Pantene shampoo in 2011. In mid-2008 there was controversy when Lucero filed a lawsuit against Universal Music for not receiving royalties for sales of some of her albums over the last 14 years, albums recorded with Melody Records from Fonovisa, now part of Universal. Melody Records had agreed in 1998 to pay what they owed but never paid off the debt. Lucero and Universal reached an undisclosed financial agreement.

Enrique Peña Nieto, governor of the State of Mexico in 2008, chose Lucero to be the official spokesperson extolling his government's achievements. After being well received, she renewed the contract in 2009. After finishing the contract, she was called to participate in the Spanish version of the album Voces (Voices) of the Greek composer Yanni, where the single "Eterno Es Este Amor" ("Eng: Eternal is this love") was released.

=== 2010s – Indispensable ===
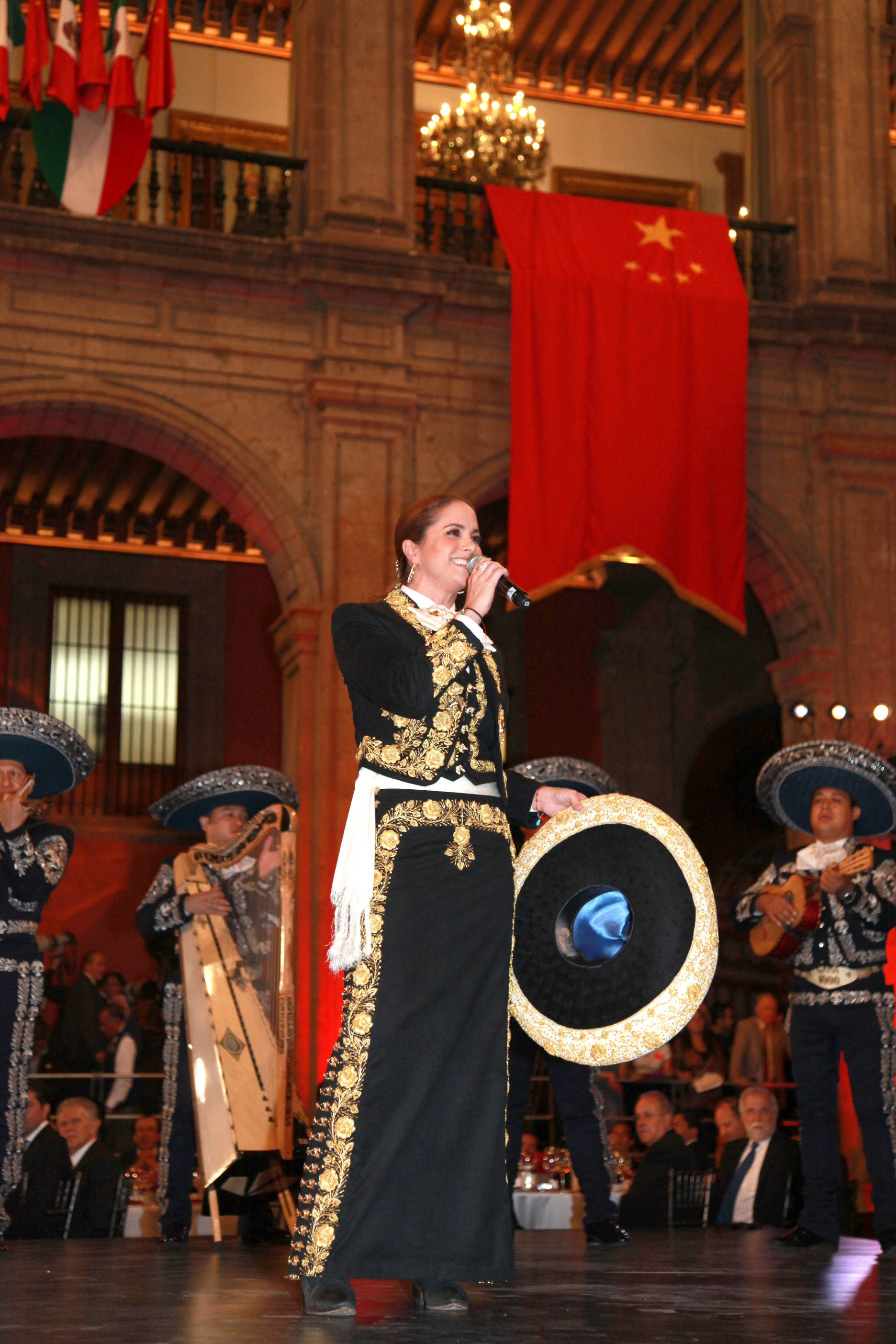
Lucero performing at the Palacio Nacional during a June 2013 state banquet for Chinese President Xi Jinping

A magnitude 7.0 earthquake struck Haiti on 12 January 2010. To aid victims, Quincy Jones and Lionel Richie released "We Are the World 25 for Haiti". Jones also commissioned a Spanish version, "Somos El Mundo 25 Por Haiti", on which Lucero sang in the chorus.

She finished filming Soy Tu Dueña, a remake of the 1995 telenovela La Dueña, where she played Valentina Villalba, alongside Fernando Colunga. In October 2010, she released Indispensable, a pop album.

For her work in television and the recording industry, Lucero's handprints have been embedded onto the Paseo de las Luminarias in Mexico City.

== Personal life and controversy ==
On 17 January 1997, Lucero married singer Manuel Mijares with whom she had two children, a son (born 12 November 2001) and a daughter (born 2 February 2005). On 4 March 2011, after 14 years of marriage, Lucero and Mijares announced their separation. In January 2014, Lucero came under controversy after she posed with her boyfriend, Michel Kuri, in front of a supposed dead animal following a hunt. She released a statement that the picture was leaked from her personal computer. Amid the criticisms, her scheduled performance at the International Festival Viña del Mar 2014 in Chile was suspended.

== Discography ==
As Lucero

- 1990: Con Mi Sentimiento
- 1991: Sólo Pienso en Tí
- 1992: Lucero de México
- 1993: Lucero
- 1994: Cariño de Mis Cariños
- 1994: Siempre Contigo
- 1997: Piel de Ángel
- 1998: Cerca de Ti
- 1999: Un Lucero en La México
- 2000: Mi Destino
- 2002: Un Nuevo Amor
- 2004: Cuando Sale un Lucero
- 2006: Quiéreme Tal Como Soy
- 2007: Lucero en Vivo Auditorio Nacional
- 2010: Indispensable
- 2011: Mi Secreto de Amor
- 2012: Un Lu*Jo
- 2013: Lucero en Concierto
- 2014: Aquí Estoy
- 2017: Enamorada con Banda
- 2017: Brasileira
- 2018: Más Enamorada con Banda
- 2018: Enamorada en Vivo
- 2019: Brasileira en Vivo
- 2019: Solo Me Faltabas Tú
- 2020: 20y20

As Lucerito

- 1982: Él
- 1984: Con Tan Pocos Años
- 1985: Fuego y Ternura
- 1986: Un Pedacito de Mí
- 1988: Lucerito
- 1989: Cuéntame

=== Special albums and EPs ===
As Lucero

- 1990: Cuando Llega el Amor
- 1995: Lazos de Amor
- 1997: Lucero le Canta a la Virgen
- 1998: Mulán
- 2003: Regina
- 2004: Zapata
- 2013: Lucero en Concierto
- 2023: El Gallo de Oro

As Lucerito

- 1982: Juguemos a Cantar
- 1982: Los Chiquillos de la TV
- 1982: 20 Navidéxitos
- 1982: América, Esta Es Tu Canción
- 1984: Disco Mensaje
- 1984: Katy, la Oruga
- 1985: Fiebre de Amor
- 1985: Keiko
- 1988: Escápate Conmigo

== Filmography ==
=== Films ===
Year	Film	Role	Notes
1983	Coqueta	Rocío	
1984	Delincuente	Cecilia Suárez	
1985	Fiebre de amor	Lucerito	Diosa de Plata Award for Breakthrough Performance Female
1988	Escápate Conmigo	Lucerito	
1989	Quisiera Ser Hombre	Manuela/Manuel	
1990	Deliciosa Sinvergüenza	Lucero	
1998	Mulan	–	She performs the Latin Spanish version of the song "Reflection", which is performed by Christina Aguilera during the film's end credits.
1999	Tarzan	Jane Porter	Voice role (Latin Spanish dub)
2004	Zapata: El sueño de un héroe	Esperanza	Nominated – MTV Movie Awards Mexico for Most Bizarre Sex
2025	Our Times	Nora	

=== Television ===
Year	Telenovela	Role	Notes
1980	Alegrías De Mediodía	Hostess	
1982	Chiquilladas	Hostess	
1982–83	Chispita	Isabel "Chispita"	TVyNovelas Awards for Best Breakthrough Performance
1985	Juguemos a Cantar	Hostess	Known in U.S. as "América, ésta es tu canción"
1986	Mujer, casos de la vida real	Chelo	Episode "El examen"
1989–90	Cuando llega el amor	Isabel Contreras de Ramírez	TVyNovelas Awards for Best Young Actress
1993	Los Parientes Pobres	Margarita Santos	TVyNovelas Awards for Best Young Actress; ACE Awards for Best Actress; Eres Awards for Best Song in a Telenovela; Nominated – TVyNovelas Awards for Best Song in a Telenovela
1995–96	Lazos de Amor	María Guadalupe Rivas Iturbe; María Fernanda Rivas Iturbe; María Paula Rivas Iturbe; Laura Iturbe	TVyNovelas Awards for Best Lead Actress; Eres Awards for Best Actress; El Heraldo Award for Best Actress in a Telenovela^{[A]} Diosa de Plata Award for Best Actress; Nominated – TVyNovelas Awards for Best Song in a Telenovela
1997–2013	Teletón	Hostess	TVyNovelas Awards Special Accolade for hosting for 26 hours(1998); El Heraldo Award for Outstanding Reality Host(1998); Estrella de Plata Award for Best Host(1998); Azteca de Oro Awards for Best Hosting(1998)
2000	Mi Destino Eres Tú	Andrea San Vicente Fernández de Galindo/de Rivadeneira	TVyNovelas Awards for Best Lead Actress
2005 & 2007	TVyNovelas Awards	Hostess	Along with Juan Soler in 2005 and Juan José Origel in 2007
2005–06	Alborada	María Hipólita Díaz de Guzmán/de Manrique	TVyNovelas Awards for Best Lead Actress; Palmas de Oro Awards for Best Lead Actress; Bravo Awards for Best Actress
2006 – 2007– 2009 – 2010– 2011	Latin Grammy Awards	Hostess	With Víctor Manuelle in 2006; Eugenio Derbez in 2007, 2009 and 2010; Cristián de la Fuente in 2011
2008–09	Mañana Es Para Siempre	Bárbara Greco de Elizalde; Rebeca Sanchez Frutos "La Hiena"	ACE Awards for Best Supporting Actress; People en Español Awards for Best Villain; Nominated – TVyNovelas Awards for Best Lead Actress
2010	Soy tu dueña	Valentina Villalba Rangel de Montesinos "La Dueña"	ACE Awards for Best Actress; Nominated – Galardón a los Grandes for Best Actress; Nominated – TVyNovelas Awards for Best Lead Actress; Nominated – Premios Juventud for Best Song from a Telenovela(Along with Joan Sebastian for "Golondrinas Viajeras")
2012	Por Ella Soy Eva	Helena Moreno Romero de Caballero	Premios People en Español 2012 for Best Actress; Nominated- TVyNovelas Awards 2013 for Best Lead Actress; Nominated- Premios People en Español 2012 for Best Couple of the Year (with Jaime Camil)
2015–2016	Teleton Brasil	Hostess	24 October 2015; 5 November 2016
2016	Carinha de Anjo	Tereza Lários	
2023	El gallo de oro	Bernarda Cutiño "La Caponera"	

Notes

- A Lucero received three awards for her performances as the main heroines "María Guadalupe" and "María Fernanda" and as the main villain "María Paula".

== Theatre credits ==
Year	Play	Role	Notes
1986	Don Juan Tenorio	Doña Inés de Ulloa	
2003	Regina	Regina	TVyNovelas Award for Best Leading Actress in a Musical

== Awards and nominations ==
Year	Award Show	Category	Nominated Work	Result
1985	El Heraldo Awards	Best Singer	Fuego y Ternura	Won
1985	TVyNovelas Awards	Best Young Singer	Fuego y Ternura	Won
1988	15 Greatest of Siempre en Domingo Awards	Best Singer	Lucerito	Won
1989	"Galardón a los Grandes" Awards	Best Singer	Lucerito	Won
1990	El Heraldo Awards	Best Singer	Cuéntame	Won
1990	"Galardón a los Grandes" Awards	Best Singer	Cuéntame	Won
1990	TVyNovelas Awards	Best Singer	Cuéntame	Won
1991	El Heraldo Award	Best Singer	Con Mi Sentimiento	Won
1991	TVyNovelas Awards	Best Singer	Con Mi Sentimiento	Won
1991	Bravo Awards	Best Singer	Con Mi Sentimiento	Won
1991	Aplauso Awards	Best Singer	Con Mi Sentimiento	Won
1991	"Galardón a los Grandes" Awards	Best Singer	Con Mi Sentimiento	Won
1992	Viña del Mar Festival	Queen of Viña del Mar Festival	Special Accolade	Won
1992	Atena Awards	Best Singer	Sólo Pienso en Ti	Won
1992	Bravo Awards	Best Singer	Sólo Pienso en Ti	Won
1992	El Heraldo Awards	Best Singer	Sólo Pienso en Ti	Won
1992	TVyNovelas Awards	Best Singer	Sólo Pienso en Ti	Won
1992	Premio "Aplauso"	Best Singer	Sólo Pienso en Ti	Won
1992	"Galardón a los Grandes" Awards	Best Singer	Sólo Pienso en Ti	Won
1992	TVyNovelas Awards	Best Legs in the Mexican Media	Special Accolade	Won
1993	El Heraldo Awards	Best International Singer	Lucero De México	Won
1993	TVyNovelas Awards	Best International Singer	Lucero De México	Won
1993	TVyNovelas Awards	Best Ranchera Album	Lucero De México	Won
1994	Eres Awards	Best Singer	Lucero	Won
1994	TVyNovelas Awards	Best Singer	Lucero	Won
1994	Furia Musical Awards	Best Ranchera Album	Cariño De Mis Cariños	Won
1994	Diosa de Plata Awards	Best Ranchera Album	Cariño De Mis Cariños	Won
1995	Eres Awards	Best Album	Siempre Contigo	Nominated
1995	TVyNovelas Awards	Best Singer	Siempre Contigo	Won
1995	El Heraldo Awards	Best Singer	Siempre Contigo	Won
1995	Eres Awards	Best Singer	Siempre Contigo	Won
1996	TVyNovelas Awards	Best Female Singer	Lazos de Amor	Won
1996	Eres Awards	Best Singer	Lazos de Amor	Won
1996	El Heraldo Award	Best Singer	Lazos de Amor	Won
1996	Bravo Award	Best Singer	Lazos de Amor	Won
1997	Acafest Medal	Medal	Special Accolade	Won
1997	TVyNovelas Awards	Best Female Singer	Piel de Ángel	Won
1997	El Heraldo Awards	Best Singer	Piel de Ángel	Won
1997	Estrella de Plata	Best Singer	Piel de Ángel	Won
1998	"Galardón a los Grandes" Awards	Best Singer	Cerca de Ti	Won
1998	Billboard Music Awards	Best Ranchera Singer	Cerca de Ti	Won
1999	TVyNovelas Awards	For her 20 years of career	Special Accolade	Won
1999	Golden Palm Awards	Lifetime Achievements	Special Accolade	Won
1999	Al Fin de Semana	Lifetime Achievements	Special Accolade	Won
2001	Viña del Mar Festival	Silver Seagull Award (Granted by the audience)	Special Accolade	Won
2002	Chamber of Commerce of Mexico & United States	Double Eagle Leadership Award	Special Accolade	Won
2002	Lunas del Auditorio Awards	Best Balladeer	Un Nuevo Amor	Nominated
2004	Furia Musical Awards	Lifetime Achievements	Special Accolade	Won
2005	TVyNovelas Awards	Lifetime Achievements; 25 years	Special Accolade	Won
2005	Orgullosamente Latino Awards	Best Latin Album of the Year	Cuando Sale Un Lucero	Won
2005	Paseo de las Luminarias	Music Hall of Fame Inductee	Special Accolade	Won
2007	Association Mr. Amigo	Mr. Amigo Award	Special Accolade	Won
2007	Orgullosamente Latino Awards	Best Album of the Year	Quiéreme Tal Como Soy	Nominated
2007	TVyNovelas Awards	Lifetime Special Career	Special Accolade	Won
2007	Orgullosamente Latino Awards	Best Latin Singer	Quiéreme Tal Como Soy	Nominated
2008	Lunas del Auditorio Awards	Best Balladeer	Quiéreme Tal Como Soy	Nominated
2010	Premios Oye! Awards	Tribute to the artistic	Special Accolade	Won
2015	Hispanic Television Summit	Outstanding Achievement in Hispanic TV	Special Accolade	Won

=== Billboard Latin Music Awards ===
The Billboard Latin Music Awards are awarded annually by Billboard magazine in the United States. Lucero has received one nomination.

Year	Category	Nominated	Result
2015	Top Latin Albums Artist of the Year, Female	Herself	Nominated

=== Billboard Mexican Music Awards ===
The Billboard Mexican Music Awards are awarded annually by Billboard magazine in the United States. Lucero has received three nominations.

Year	Category	Nominated	Result
2013	Female Artist of the Year	Herself	Nominated
2013	Ranchero/Mariachi of the Year	Herself	Nominated
2013	Ranchero/Mariachi Album of the Year	Un Lujo	Nominated

== See also ==
- List of best-selling Latin music artists
- Women in Latin music
