= Zapata: el sueño del héroe =

- Film poster
- Directed by: Alfonso Arau
- Written by: Alfonso Arau
- Produced by: Pliny Porter; Alfonso Arau
- Starring: Alejandro Fernández; Patricia Velásquez
- Cinematography: Vittorio Storaro
- Edited by: Carlos Puente
- Music by: Ruy Folguera
- Release date: 2004
- Country: Mexico
- Languages: Spanish; Nahuatl

Zapata: el sueño del héroe (in English: Zapata: The dream of a hero), also titled simply Zapata, is a 2004 Mexican epic biographical war drama film.

This fictionalized portrayal of Emiliano Zapata, played by Alejandro Fernández, as an Indigenous Mexican, directed by Alfonso Arau, was reportedly the most expensive Mexican movie ever produced, with a massive ad campaign, and the largest ever opening in the nation's history. Unusual in the Mexican film industry, Zapata was financed independently.

Zapata made its U.S. debut at the Santa Fe Film Festival on December 3, 2004 at the Center for Contemporary Arts in Santa Fe, New Mexico.

== Plot ==
The film happens in the last quarter of the 19th century and the first nineteen years of the twentieth, during the dictatorship of Porfirio Díaz, the presidency of Francisco I. Madero, the military revolt of Victoriano Huerta, the Convention of Generals and, finally, the death of Zapata, already in the constitutionalist stage of Venustiano Carranza. The film does not try to be a chair of history but a fable that obtains the identification of the spectators with the hero, through the successive confrontation of the protagonist with the power, represented in the antagonistic figure of Victoriano Huerta. In it, Emiliano Zapata appears like predestining, "the signal" in his chest, the mark or spot with the form of a little hand is the sign that identifies him as "the one" by the Huehuetlatolli (the heirs of the tradition) to be their guide. Thus, we see the birth of Emiliano, where he is recognized like the possible leader of his town. Zapata will have to break with his vision of the "real reality" and to enter in that other magical knowledge of the Mexican tradition and its inscrutable religious "sincretismo".

== Cast (in credits order) ==
- Patricia Velásquez as Josefa
- Lucero as Esperanza
- Jesús Ochoa as Victoriano Huerta
- Jaime Camil as Eufemio
- Soledad Ruiz as Juana Lucia
- Arturo Beristáin as González
- Julio Bracho as Guajardo
- Alberto Estrella as Martinez
- José Luis Cruz
- Ángeles Cruz
- Evangelina Sosa as Azucena
- Angélica Aragón as Mesera 1
- Carmen Salinas as Mesera 2
- Blanca Tenario as Mesera 3
- Fernando Becerril as Presidente Francisco Madero
- Juan Peláez
- Miguel Couturier as Limantour
- Justo Martínez as Porfirio Díaz
- Gerardo Martínez as De la O
- Rafael Cortés as Arturo
- Alejandro Calva as Gilgerdo Magaña
- Omar Sánchez as Otilio Montaña
- Javier Escobar as Joaquin
- Eduardo Ocaña as Pablo
- Isi Rojano as Sobrina
- Marcial Alejandro as Trovador
- Francisco Badillo as Zapatista 1
- Raymundo Ibarra as Zapatista 2
- Mayolival Del Monte as Mujer Zapatista
- Luis Enrique Parra as Francisco Villa
- Sharmel Altamirano
- Alejandra Palacios
- Jaime Estrada as Gabriel Zapata
- Angélica Lara as Madre de Zapata
- Rafael Velasco as Don Lázaro
- César Valdéz as Sargento
- Julian Sedgwick as USA Ambassador
- Paulino Hemmer as Secretario de Huerta
- Gerardo Pérez
- Alejandro Fernández as Emiliano Zapata
- Omar Espino as Eufemio Niño
- Paola Ayala as Josefa Niña
- José Antonio Gutiérrez as Mensajero Federal
- Eleno Guzmán as Soldado
- Evangelina Martínez as Vieja
- José María Negri as Sacerdote
- Godofredo Villegas as Maestro de Ceremonias
- Brenda Angulo as Prostituta
- Carla Hernández as Prostituta
- Tony Helling as Prostituta
- Liliana Lago as Prostituta
- Juana Ponce as Prostituta
- Maria Guadalupe Hernández as Prostituta
- Gabriela Tavela as Ama de llaves
- Alfonso Garza as Marido celoso
- Nayeli Márquez as Esposa Infiel
- Luis Rubiera as Asistante de Gonzalez
- Eduardo Francisco Galeano as Asistante de Gonzalez
