= Sólo Pienso en Ti (Lucero album) =

Sólo Pienso En Tí

Studio album by Lucero
- Released: 29 June 1991
- Recorded: 1990–1991
- Genre: Pop
- Label: Melody
- Producer: Rafael Pérez Botija

Lucero chronology
Con Mi Sentimiento (1990)	Sólo Pienso En Tí (1991)	Lucero De México (1992)

Singles from Sólo Pienso En Ti
- 1. "Electricidad" Released: 6 May 1991; 2. "Ya no" Released: 19 August 1991; 3. "Tu desdén" Released: 14 October 1991; 4. "Amor secreto" Released: 9 December 1991; 5. "Autocontrol" Released: 10 February 1992

Sólo Pienso En Ti (I only think about you) is the eighth album from Mexican singer and actress Lucero. It was released in 1991, selling til today more than 5 million copies. The first single, "Electricidad", went to No. 1 in Mexico in just three weeks. The song was so hot that the second single "Ya No" was No. 2 when the former were still at the top of the charts. Eventually "Ya No" hit the No. 1 spot for 5 weeks, until Luis Miguel's "Inolvidable" debuted at the No. 1. The album was the first of many collaborations with Rafael Pérez Botija.

== Track listing ==
All songs written and arranged by Rafael Pérez Botija.

No.	Title	Length
1.	"Ya No"	3:40
2.	"Quién Pudiera Quererte"	3:35
3.	"Nada Como Ser Miss"	3:26
4.	"Necesito Tu Amor"	4:12
5.	"Electricidad"	4:05
6.	"Tu Desdén"	3:19
7.	"Amor en Primer Grado"	2:55
8.	"Amor Secreto"	3:31
9.	"Autocontrol"	3:32
10.	"Sólo Pienso en Ti"	4:19

== Singles ==
#	Title	Mexico	United States Hot Lat.	Costa Rica	Argentina	Chile	Colombia	Nicaragua
1.	"Electricidad"	#1	#5	#1	#1	#1	#1	#1
2.	"Ya no"	#1	#7	#1	#9	#2	#5	#1
3.	"Tu desdén"	#15	n/a	#4	n/a	n/a	#9	#2
4.	"Amor secreto"	#5	n/a	#5	#15	#5	#10	#1
5.	"Autocontrol"	#25	n/a	n/a	n/a	n/a	n/a	#20

== Chart performance ==
This was the first time that an album by Lucero had ever entered the list of Billboard in the pop music category. The album stayed in the chart of Latin Pop Albums for 17 weeks, 2 of them were in the top ten; entering at No. 9 and then peaking No. 7. the sales of this disc are estimated between 4 and 5 million copies sold

Chart	Peak
Billboard Latin Pop Albums	7
