= Él (album) =

Studio album by Lucerito
- Released: 22 September 1982
- Recorded: 1981–1982
- Genre: Mexican pop • Post disco
- Label: Musart
- Producer: Sergio Andrade

Lucerito chronology
Él (1982)	Juguemos a Cantar (1982)

Singles from Te Prometo
- 1. "Él" Released: 13 August 1982; 2. "Te Prometo" Released: 29 October 1982; 3. "América, Esta es tu Canción" Released: 7 December 1982

Él is the debut album from Mexican singer and actress Lucerito. It was released in 1982 when she was 13 years old, and she had a great acceptance in the Mexican audience. This album is also known asTe Prometo. It was produced by Sergio Andrade.

== History ==
Lucerito was launched to fame by Sergio Andrade, who from the time when she auditioned, he realized that with the talent and charisma of the girl and his genius as a producer and talent scout, would make her an international star.

In 1982, Sergio Andrade composed the song "Juguemos a Cantar" and recorded with Lucerito, also for his own record company Discos Arpegios, where he provided the arrangements, direction and production. In that same year, Sergio Andrade sells the recording contract he had signed originally with Lucerito, and from that moment he remains as a composer, arranger, producer, musical director and representative of her, becoming the company Discos Musart the one that would fund and publish the albums of the young singer.

When the album was released for the first time, it was under the name of "Te Prometo", but after the release of a movie with the same name, the company decided to reissue and title it "Él".

== Track listing ==
The album is composed by ten songs, all of them were arranged, directed and produced by Sergio Andrade, except where it's indicated.

No.	Title	Writer(s)	Length
1.	"Te prometo"	Sergio Andrade	2:55
2.	"Viernes"	S.Andrade	2:53
3.	"Secundaria"	Victor M. Zaldivar	3:00
4.	"Hola...Amigos del espacio"	S.Andrade	2:56
5.	"Él"	S.Andrade	3:00
6.	"Amárralo"	S.Andrade	3:30
7.	"La, la, la cómo te quiero"	S. Andrade	2:50
8.	"Amigas"	S. Andrade	3:05
9.	"Los Reyes magos"	Capuano, Scott, Giosafatte	2:50
10.	"América esta es tu canción"	S. Andrade	3:07

== Singles ==
#	Title	B-sides	Date
1.	"Él"	"Amigas"	1982
2.	"Te prometo"	"La, la, la cómo te quiero"	1982
3.	"América, ésta es tú canción"	-	1982
