= Quiéreme Tal Como Soy =

Studio album by Lucero
- Released: 9 September 2006
- Recorded: 2006
- Genre: Pop
- Length: 42:20
- Label: EMI
- Producer: Guillermo Gil

Lucero chronology
Cuando Sale Un Lucero (2004)	Quiéreme Tal Como Soy (2006)	Lucero En Vivo Auditorio Nacional (2007)

Singles from Quiéreme Tal Como Soy
- 1. "La única que te entiende" Released: 28 February 2006; 2. "O tú o nada" Released: 6 April 2006; 3. "Que pasará mañana" Released: 14 August 2006; 4. "Tú eres mi refugio" Released: 29 September 2006

Quiéreme Tal Como Soy (Eng.: Love Me As I Am) is the eighteenth studio album by Mexican singer and actress Lucero. It was released in September 2006. The album contains reworked versions of some of her greatest hits written by Rafael Pérez Botija and covers of music by Rocío Dúrcal, Mocedades and José José (also written by Pérez-Botija). On 29 November 2006 the album was certified in Mexico as gold album, after selling 100,000 copies only in Mexico.

== Track listing ==
The album is composed by twelve songs, all of them were arranged and composed by Rafael Perez Botija.

No.	Title	Writer(s)	Length
1.	"Veleta"	Rafael Pérez Botija	3:46
2.	"La gata bajo la lluvia"	Rafael Pérez Botija	3:24
3.	"Quiéreme tal como soy"	Rafael Pérez Botija	3:27
4.	"O tú o nada"	Rafael Pérez Botija	3:29
5.	"La única que te entiende"	Rafael Pérez Botija	3:25
6.	"Ya no"	Rafael Pérez Botija	3:30
7.	"Jamás te dejaré"	Rafael Pérez Botija	3:08
8.	"Tú eres mi refugio"	Claudio Bermúdez	3:45
9.	"Electricidad"	Rafael Pérez Botija	4:25
10.	"Qué pasará mañana"	Rafael Perez Botija	3:10
11.	"Y qué"	Rafael Pérez Botija	3:10
12.	"Sobreviviré"	Rafael Pérez Botija	3:14

== Singles ==
#	Title	Mexico	Argentina	Costa Rica	Colombia	Chile	Peru	Nicaragua
1.	"La única que te entiende"	14	13	2	2	1	3	1
2.	"O tú o nada"	64	35	n/a	45	19	20	10
3.	"Que pasará mañana"	8	20	10	15	1	12	1
4.	"Tú eres mi refugio"	42	n/a	16	n/a	5	29	6

== Album certification ==
Region	Certification	Certified units/sales
Mexico (AMPROFON)	Gold	50,000^{^}
^{^} Shipments figures based on certification alone.

== Awards ==
It received two nominations in the Orgullosamente Latino Awards, one for Latin Album of the Year, but lost to RBD's "Celestial" and the other for Best Female Singer, losing to Olga Tañón. It was also nominated for Best Balladeer in Lunas del Auditorio Awards, award that was given to Emmanuel.

Year	Region	Award	Category	Result
2007	Mexico	Orgullosamente Latino Award	Best Latin Album	Nominated
2007	Mexico	Orgullosamente Latino Award	Best Female Singer	Nominated
2008	Mexico	Lunas del Auditorio Awards	Best Balladeer	Nominated

== Release history ==
This album was released in 3 formats:

- Digipack case for Mexican edition (September 2006)
- Normal case for USA edition (November 2006)
- Digital release

Country	Format	Date
Chile	CD	September 19, 2006
Colombia	CD	September 19, 2006
Costa Rica	CD	September 19, 2006
Mexico	CD & Digital	September 9, 2006
Puerto Rico	CD & Digital	September 19, 2006
United States	CD & Digital	September 19, 2006
