= Un Nuevo Amor (Lucero album) =

Studio album by Lucero
- Released: 31 March 2002
- Recorded: 2001–2002
- Genre: Mariachi
- Label: Sony Music
- Producers: Rubén Fuentes, Homero Patrón, Estefano

Lucero chronology
Mi Destino (2000)	Un Nuevo Amor (2002)	Regina (2003)

Singles from Un Nuevo Amor
- 1. "Que alguien me diga" Released: 17 January 2002; 2. "Como te voy a olvidar" Released: 21 May 2002

Un Nuevo Amor (A new love) is the sixteenth album from Mexican singer and actress Lucero. It was released in 2002.

Is the fifth album recorded by Lucero with mariachi. On this project the singer had the collaboration of another two producers: Homero Patrón and Estefano, and along with longtime producer Ruben Fuentes, who produced her past four albums with mariachi, deliver eleven tracks, including covers like "Por Ti" (originally by Óscar Chávez), "Carta a Ufemia" (by Pedro Infante) and "Como Te Voy a Olvidar" (by Los Angeles Azules) and some brand new tracks by Estefano and Marco Flores.

It received a nomination for Best Ballad in the Lunas del Auditorio Awards, but lost to Rosana.

The disc certify gold record for 80,000 copies sold in Mexico.

== Track listing ==
The album is composed by ten songs, all of them were arranged and composed by different composers.

No.	Title	Writer(s)	Length
1.	"Que alguien me diga"	Omar Alfano	4:21
2.	"Volver jamás"	Roberto Belester	3:25
3.	"Por ti"	Óscar Chávez	2:43
4.	"Yo no te perdí"	R. Belester	3:34
5.	"Carta a Ufemia"	Rubén Méndez, Rubén Fuentes	3:06
6.	"A quien voy a engañar"	Raúl Del Sol, Estéfano	4:22
7.	"Me gusta"	Marco Flores	3:49
8.	"Lo he intentado todo"	Del Sol, Estéfano	3:58
9.	"Cómo te voy a olvidar"	Jorge Mejía Avante	4:25
10.	"Me duele la piel"	Gloria Nevárez	3:09

== Critical reception ==
Professional ratings
Review scores
Source	Rating
Allmusic	3.0/5 stars

Year	Region	Award	Category	Result
2002	Mexico	Lunas del Auditorio Awards	Best Ballad	Nominated

== Personnel ==
For the tracks "Volver Jamás", "Que Alguien me Diga", "Por Tí" and "Yo No Te Perdí"

- Producer and arranger: Homero Patrón
- Recorded and mixed: Mauricio Guerrero at Waterfront, Studio City, CA
- Engineer: Carlos Castro
- Vihuela: Jose Guadalupe Alfaro
- Guitar: Juan Carlos Giron
- Guitarron: Bernardino de Santiago
- Trumpet: Harry Kim and Ramon Flores
- Sax: Doug Norwine and Don Marklese
- Guitar solos: Ramon Satgmaro
- French horn: Wolfie and Jodie Glorry
- Keyboards: Homero Patron
- String: The Velvet Strings/Jorge Moraga
- Latin percussion: Rafael Padilla
- Backing vocals: Leyla Hoyle

For the tracks “Carta a Ufemia”, “Como te voy a olvidar” and “Me Duele la Piel”

- Producer: Rubén Fuentes
- Arrangements: Pepe Martinez (“Carta a Ufemia”), Manuel Cazarez (“Como te voy a olvidar”) and Ruben Fuentes (“Me duele la Piel”)
- Mariachi: Vargas de Tecalitlan
- Recording and mixing: Carlos Ceballos at Joel Solis Studio (Mexico)

For the tracks “A Quién Voy a Engañar” and “Lo He Intentado Todo”

- Producer: Estefano for Estefano Productions Group
- Arrangements and programming: Rey-Nerio
- Voice direction: Ruben Fuentes
- Recording engineer and overdubs: Andres Bermudez
- Percussion: Edwin Bonilla
- Mariachi “2000” by Cutberto Perez
- Trumpets: Jose Cutberto Perez, and Juan Guzman
- Violins: Pedro Garcia, Jose Vasquez, Petronila Godinez, Muricio Ramos, Eloy Guerrero, Sergio Guerrero, Benjamín Rosas, Hugo Santiago and Julio de Santiago
- Guitarron: Miguel Gonzalez
- Vihuela: Juan Carlos Giron
- Guitar: Juan Carlos Navarro
- Mastering: Michael Fuller at Fullersound, Miami
- Executive producer: Marco Rubi
- Direction A&R: Angel Carrasco
- Coordination A&R: Marco Cataño
- Photography: Adolfo Perez Butron
- Art direction: Pamela Postigo Uribe
- Design: Gustavio Cruz Castañeda
