= Chiquilladas =

Mexican sketch and musical show

- Country of origin: Mexico

Original release
- Release: 1982 – 1993

Chiquilladas is a Mexican sketch and musical show that used only children as actors. First aired on Mexican television in 1982, it ran until 1993. During its run it was the first to showcase various Mexican artists including Carlos Espejel, Pierre Angelo, Aleks Syntek, Lucero and Anahí.

== Characters ==
- Carlinflas (portrayed by Carlos Espejel) - Was a kid impersonation from famous comedy character Cantinflas.
- Chiquidrácula (Carlos Espejel) - A comedy version of Bela Lugosi's Dracula, who tried repeatedly to give other kids "meyo" (a corruption of word "miedo", fright).
- Pituka y Petaka - Two mexican-indigenous sisters who always made scams on foreign tourists.
- Popeye and Olive - Lucero portrayed as Olive Oyl, and Aleks Syntek featured as Bluto.
- 24 Horitas - A spoof of the main Televisa news-show (at the time) 24 Horas. Petaka was cast as Jacobo Zabludovsky. Pituka appeared as "Tacha" saying comic poems, impersonating the actor Hector Kiev (Tacho Lopez Cuarzo), who gave sport forecasts on the real news show, using a black charro suit. Also Ginni was called "Bolita Ayala", alluding the newscaster Lolita Ayala. She send the news focus back to Jacobo through a "bolita de papel" (paper-ball)
- 60 Minutitos - Was a spoof about the investigative television magazine 60 Minutes. Carlos Espejel was the principal reporter and Ginni appeared as Virginia Leteme. A running gag was that some of the news were related to Virginia's cat.
- Ha-Mon - A comical version of He-Man, where the character was fat and used his body as a battering ram. Also, his quote was "Por el Poder de mi panza" (By the Power of my belly).

== Awards ==
| Year | Ceremony | Award | Result |
|---|---|---|---|
| 1983 | 1st TVyNovelas Awards | Best Children's Program | Won |
