= Ocho Quince =

Lucerito

Studio album by Lucerito
- Released: 16 April 1988
- Recorded: 1987–1988
- Genre: Pop
- Label: Melody
- Producer: Jaime Sánchez Rosaldo

Lucerito chronology
| Escápate Conmigo (1988) | Lucerito (1988) | Cuéntame (1989) |

Singles from Lucerito
- 1. "Millones Mejor que Tú" Released: 18 February 1988; 2. "Vete con Ella" Released: 25 April 1988; 3. "Tu amiga fiel" Released: 6 June 1988; 4. "Telefonómana" Released: 21 August 1988; 5. "No me hablen de él" Released: 27 September 1988

Lucerito, also known colloquially as Ocho Quince, is the fifth studio album by Mexican singer and actress Lucerito. It was released on 16 April 1988, by Fonovisa's Discos Melody. It included two covers, The Dixie Cups' "Chapel of Love" from the original 1965 Spanish version by Mayté Gaos "Vete con Ella" and Carole King's "You've Got a Friend" with "Tu Amiga Fiel". It was Lucero's first record to be released on compact disc.

== Track listing ==
The album is composed by ten songs.

| No. | Title | Writer(s) | Length |
|---|---|---|---|
| 1. | "Ocho Quince" | Joan Sebastian | 3:07 |
| 2. | "Millones Mejor Que Tú" | Carlos Lara, Jesús Monárrez | 3:07 |
| 3. | "Cenicienta Se Acabó" | Sue y Javier | 3:00 |
| 4. | "No Puedo Estar Sin Ti" | Manuel Eduardo Castro | 3:00 |
| 5. | "Tu Amiga Fiel" | Carole King, Sue | 4:53 |
| 6. | "Vete Con Ella" | Jeff Barry, Ellie Greenwich, Phil Spector | 3:40 |
| 7. | "Marioneta" | Sue y Javier | 3:18 |
| 8. | "Y Todas Las Tardes" | Jorge Massias | 3:24 |
| 9. | "Telefonómana" | Carlos Vargas, Luigi Lazareno, J.Antonio Sosa | 3:11 |
| 10. | "No Me Hablen de Él" | Sue y Javier | 3:30 |

== Singles ==
| # | Title | Mexico | United States Hot Lat. | Costa Rica |
|---|---|---|---|---|
| 1. | "Millones Mejor que Tú" | #1 | n/a | #6 |
| 2. | "Vete con ella" | #2 | #7 | #9 |
| 3. | "Tu amiga fiel" | #1 | n/a | #1 |
| 4. | "Telefonómana" | #20 | n/a | n/a |
| 5. | "No me hablen de él" | #5 | #5 | #13 |

== Sales ==
"Lucerito" sold 400,000 copies earning Gold Disc, which 250,000 were sold in Mexico. In 5 months some singles are released: "Millones mejor que tú", "No me hablen de él" and "Tu amiga fiel". She recorded two videos to promote the album, "Vete con ella" and "Millones mejor que tú", they peaked the Top 10 on the program of Gloria Calzada called "8O's Stars". The album achieved high sales in Costa Rica, Chile, Colombia, Venezuela, Guatemala, U.S.A., which Lucero visited to promote her album.
