= Indispensable (Lucero album) =

Studio album by Lucero
- Released: 21 September 2010; Special edition 25 January 2011
- Genres: Pop, dance-pop, electropop
- Length: 39:40
- Label: Siente Music / Universal Music Latino
- Producers: Ric Wake; Cesar Lemos; Lucero

Lucero chronology
Lucero En Vivo Auditorio Nacional (2007)	Indispensable (2010)	Mi Secreto de Amor (2011)

Alternative cover
- Special edition cover

Singles from Indispensable
- 1. "Dueña de tu Amor" Released: 10 August 2010; 2. "Indispensable" Released: 5 October 2010; 3. "Esta Vez La Primera Soy Yo" Released: 28 March 2011; 4. "Eres Todo" Released: 6 June 2011

Indispensable is the nineteenth studio album by Mexican singer Lucero. The album was released on 21 September 2010 in the United States and Mexico. The first single from the album, "Dueña de tu Amor" (Eng: Owner of your love), is part of the soundtrack of the #1 telenovela in Univision Soy tu dueña. This album is considered her comeback after 4 years since her last studio album Quiéreme Tal Como Soy.

== History ==
After 4 years of absence from the music world, Lucero returned with "Indispensable", under record label Siente Music and Universal Music on 21 September 2010.

In this production, Lucero takes risks and gets a CD in which we find the privacy of their ballads and rhythmic themes very strong, surprising even more in her new facet as a composer and producer. Lucero, who was in the middle of the recordings of the internationally telenovela Soy tu dueña, helped in the composition of the songs included in this long-awaited production, which also co-produced with Cesar Lemos and Ric Wake. The latter is highly sought because of his works with Mariah Carey, Celine Dion and Whitney Houston, and also collaborated in her 2000 studio album Mi Destino.

== Sales and impact ==
Professional ratings
Review scores
Source	Rating
Allmusic	2.5/5 stars
En El Show	2/5 stars
El Nuevo Herald	4/5 stars

At the time of its release, Indispensable has received generally mixed reviews from critics; for example critic John Witzgall from Allmusic.com states that "the tracks start off with an intro of highly processed sounds, which are actually sort of appealing. The mixing is also pretty stellar", however he felt that her "production style is simply boring, rather than outright laughable". The songs Esta Vez la Primera Soy Yo, Eres Todo and Ahora Estoy Sin Tí were labeled an "AMG Track Pick". Michael Quaid, En El Show from Mexico, compares her to Dulce María, and he thinks the album is very synthesized and robotic for her voice, and "dangerously juvenile" for a consolidated singer like her, where "she must put her vocal talents in the hands of great composers and leave this kind of rhythms to disposable bushleague artists". The critic Manuel Diaz from El Nuevo Herald stated that "Indispensable is a dizzying musical album with gripping lyrics", where he highlighted that the album is "too young, too disco" for her audience.

The album received favorable reviews, according to People en Español the song "Dueña de tu amor" was chosen between the 3 best comebacks of the year, an honor that shared with Shakira's Loba and Chayanne's Me enamoré de ti; this song was also considered the third best theme of the year in this magazine, giving a big surprise because of her very young competitors like Anahí and Dulce María. Yahoo! en Español in its Top Ten of "Famous", "Entertainment" and "Music" ranked Lucero as the #1 in each category.

On 25 January 2011, out wing sale exclusively for the U.S. Special Edition, where it remained as one of the best-selling album of the year, which included a different bookart, Owner of Your Love Remix and wagon version, and also wallpapers and exclusive photos. Also included the video Indispensable, and behind the cameras.

== Track listing ==
The album comprises 10 new songs, plus an English version of the song "Indispensable" and the version of "Dueña de tu Amor" for the telenovela.

No.	Title	Writer(s)	Length
1.	"Indispensable"	Lucero, Karla Aponte, Cesar Lemos	3:00
2.	"Eres Todo"	Lucero, Talita Real, Ender Thomas	3:37
3.	"Amor Virtual"	Lucero, K. Aponte, C. Lemos, Ernesto Fernández	3:07
4.	"Mi Refugio y Libertad"	Lucero, K. Aponte, C. Lemos	3:28
5.	"Esta Vez la Primera Soy Yo"	Lucero, K. Aponte, C. Lemos, Fernández	2:36
6.	"Daño Irreparable"	Lucero, K. Aponte, C. Lemos	3:14
7.	"Te Quiero Aunque no Quiera"	Lucero, K. Aponte, C. Lemos	3:16
8.	"Dueña de Tu Amor"	Lucero, K. Aponte, Silvio Richetto	3:40
9.	"Mucho Más Que Dos"	Lucero, K. Aponte, C. Lemos	3:33
10.	"Ahora Estoy Sin Ti"	Lucero, K. Aponte, C. Lemos	3:27
11.	"Indispensable (English Version)"	Lucero, K. Aponte, C. Lemos, Ric Wake	3:01
12.	"Dueña de Tu Amor (Telenovela Version)"	Lucero, K. Aponte, Richetto	3:41

Special edition I
No.	Title	Writer(s)	Length
13.	"Dueña de Tu Amor (Dance Mix)"	Lucero, K. Aponte, Richetto	3:34
14.	"Dueña de Tu Amor (Ranchera)"	Lucero, K. Aponte, Richetto	3:36
15.	"Indispensable Behind the Scenes"		1:48
16.	"Indispensable (Closed-Captioned)"	Lucero, K. Aponte, C. Lemos, Luieville & Co.	3:45
17.	"Pictures Gallery"
18.	"Wallpapers"

Special edition II
No.	Title	Writer(s)	Length
13.	"Dueña de Tu Amor (Dance Mix)"	Lucero, K. Aponte, Richetto	3:34
14.	"Dueña de Tu Amor (Ranchera)"	Lucero, K. Aponte, Richetto	3:36
15.	"Indispensable (Video)"	Lucero, K. Aponte, C. Lemos, Luieville & Co.	3:45

== Singles ==
The first single of this production was "Owner of Your Love" which, soon after being released, placed on top of the charts, reaching number 1 in Costa Rica, and was included in the end credits of the telenovela "I'm Your Owner," boosting the popularity of the telenovela and the Lucero's CD. The single played on the radio in the majority of the countries in South America.

Her second single was the song that gives name to the album "Indispensable." The single was promoted throughout Latin America, ranking as one of the most requested songs on radio. In the United States, the English version of "Indispensable" was released. it is of mecinar which was number 1 on the radio in 2 countries in South America. For this simple officer shooting a movie which caused much controversy, leaving Lucero to be sexier than usual, apart from being way too "young", opinions are divided about the view that the video was appalling, while media and fans felt it was excellent to be renewed after many years with its image of demure woman. On the official website of Lucero (www.lucero.com.mx) there are 12 remixes of this song available, free to download.

For her third single, Lucero chose one of the best songs on the album "This Time I'm First" a song which was heavily promoted. A high quality video was recorded for the song which portrayed Lucero in a very sexy way. In the video, there was a man being dominated by a group of women, as well as Lucero, to show dominance and power, the message of the song. The song was much played in the U.S. and in smaller countries of Europe. This song was performed by Lucero on shows like "Pequños Gigantes" "Nuestra Belleza Latina" and Premios Billboards in 2011, where she gave the most acclaimed presentation of the night. As Indispensable launched in download form on page 7, Lucero official released free remixes of this song.

The fourth and final single was "You're Everything" one of the most romantic songs of this album. The day they released the single, it played with frequency on the radios in Mexico, the United States and some South American countries. Despite this, it was not given much promotion, therefore it didn't acquire much popularity. There was not remixes for this song.

== Charts ==
Lucero had not been in any Billboard charts since 12 years ago when she entered with her album Cerca de ti in 1998 (She also charted again in the same year as a featured artist with the song Privilegio de amar). Lucero made a big entrance debuting in #4 in Billboard Top Latin Albums and #3 in Billboard Latin Pop Albums being these debuts her highest entrances to Billboard ever; also Indispensable is her first album to enter to Billboard 200.

Chart	Peak
Billboard 200	172
Billboard Top Latin Albums	4
Billboard Latin Pop Albums	3
Mexican Album Chart	16

== Release history ==
Country	Format	Date
Belize	CD	12 October 2010
Colombia	CD	12 October 2010
Costa Rica	CD	12 October 2010
Ecuador	CD	12 October 2010
El Salvador	CD	12 October 2010
Guatemala	CD	12 October 2010
Honduras	CD	12 October 2010
Mexico	CD & Digital	21 September 2010
Nicaragua	CD	12 October 2010
Panama	CD	12 October 2010
Peru	CD	12 October 2010
Puerto Rico	CD & Digital	21 September 2010
United States	CD & Digital	21 September 2010
Venezuela	CD	October 12, 2010
