= Mi destino =

Studio album by Lucero
- Released: 21 July 2000
- Recorded: 1999–2000
- Genres: Pop, Latin pop
- Label: Sony
- Producers: Jimmy Greco; Ray Contreras; Ric Wake; Rafael Pérez-Botija; Ricardo "Eddy" Martínez; Jean B. Smit

Lucero chronology
Un Lucero en La México (1999)	Mi destino (2000)	Un Nuevo Amor (2002)

Singles from Mi destino
- 1. "Mi destino eres tú" Released: 22 March 2000; 2. "No puedo más" Released: 28 May 2000; 3. "Nadie me quiere como tú" Released: 1 July 2000; 4. "Cada latido" Released: 29 October 2000

Mi destino (Eng.: My Destiny) is the fifteenth album from Mexican singer and actress Lucero. It was released on 21 July 2000.

This album is the second time in Lucero's career where she writes her own material; she wrote the Spanish version of the first single "Mi Destino Eres Tú" (My Destiny Is You). Eventually the song went No. 1 in Mexico powered by the telenovela of the same name, starring herself, Jorge Salinas and Jaime Camil. She also collaborated some lyrics for the track "Arde" (Burn) and did the Spanish version of "Vamos a Cantar" (Everything is Right...) which was the official song for the 2000 Mexican Teletón.

It is also the first time that more than two producers work on a single album of the artist. On this project the singer also includes two songs completely sung in English and according to the album's booklet: "in a New York English pronunciation". Rafael Pérez-Botija worked again with Lucero, this time with five tracks (written and produced by him). Ric Wake produced "Tuya" (Yours), "Mi Destino Eres Tú", "Nadie Me Quiere Como Tú" and "Vamos a Cantar".

Jean B. Smit did "Llegarás" (You'll Come), which was supposed to be the first single for the album, since the telenovela that Lucero was going to shoot had this name initially, but since the title of the novela was changed to "Mi Destino Eres Tú," the track was not released as a single.

"No Puedo Más" (English and Spanish versions) were produced by the team of Jimmy Greco and Ray Contreras (Jimmyray Productions). Ricardo "Eddy" Martínez worked as producer for "Arde".

"Nadie Me Quiere Como Tú" (Nobody Loves Me Like You), "No Puedo Más" (Can't Take it Anymore) and "Cada Latido" (Each Heartbeat) were also released as singles.

This album was the first studio album recorded by Lucero on her new label at the time Sony and the sales eventually reached gold status in Mexico (150,000 copies sold).

== Reviews ==
The album received generally positive reviews when it was released, for example Drago Bonacich from Allmusic.com highlighted her work with Rick Wake, Rafael Perez Botija, Jimmy Greco, and Ray Contreras; besides he pointed out the Spanish versions of several songs in the album, where Tuya was the stand-out track of the album receiving an AMG Pick Track. On his review he said the songs are "supported by well-balanced arrangements".

Professional ratings
Review scores
Source	Rating
Allmusic	3/5 stars

== Problems with Sony ==
With this album, Sony planned to internationalization the image of Lucero, intending globalization. However Sony, at that time, contemplated to "throw the boat out with this record" but with a high quality production, they were unsure how well it would do with the public due to the departure of Tommy Mottola.

A tour was also planned early on in 2001 but failed to transpire due to Lucero's first pregnancy. Sony began to show disinterest in the disk and its attempts at the "internationalization" of Lucero. The album sold only 150,000 copies certifying gold status, but was a failure for Sony. "My Destiny" is one of the best albums by Lucero, a production from the likes of Celine Dion and Mariah Carey, whom have sold millions of copies worldwide.

== Track listing ==
The album is composed by 14 songs, all of them were arranged by different composers.

No.	Title	Writer(s)	Length
1.	"No puedo más (Don't waste my time)"	Ray Contreras, Jimmy Greco, Andy Varga, Manny Benito	4:01
2.	"Tuya (Do you wanna be mine)"	Steve Skinner, Arnie Roman, Karla Aponte	3:50
3.	"Mi destino eres tú (Quiero Amor) (From you)"	Jim Daddario, Will Robinson, Aaron Saint, Lucero	3:00
4.	"Cada latido"	Rafael Pérez Botija	3:58
5.	"Arde"	Roberto Amaro, Lucero, Jean B. Smit	3:26
6.	"Prisionera"	R. Pérez Botija	4:21
7.	"Nadie me quiere como tú (Everything)"	Denise Rich, Andy Marvel, Peter Zizzo, Giselle D'Cole, Alejandro Lerner	4:36
8.	"Llegarás"	Mario Santos, Juan Carlos Paz y Puente, Roberto Figueroa	3:27
9.	"Mátame"	R. Pérez Botija	4:58
10.	"Dejar de querer"	R. Pérez Botija	5:19
11.	"Quiero amor (From you) (Mi destino eres tú)"	J. Daddario, W. Robinson, A. Saint	3:00
12.	"Bailar"	R. Pérez Botija	4:51
13.	"Vamos a cantar (Everything is Right...)"	Arnie Roman, Russ DeSalvo, Lucero	3:26
14.	"Don't waste my time (No puedo más)"	R. Contreras, J. Greco, A. Varga, M. Benito	4:01

== Singles ==
#	Title	Mexico	Argentina	Costa Rica	Colombia	Chile	Peru	Nicaragua	Venezuela
1.	"Mi destino eres tú"	1	9	2	8	1	10	1	15
2.	"No puedo más"	15	25	10	10	9	8	1	14
3.	"Nadie me quiere como tú"	6	23	11	10	5	15	10	32
4.	"Cada latido"	20	31	15	n/a	n/a	15	9	n/a

== Personnel ==
- Producers: Jimmy Greco & Ray Contreras for Jimmyray Productions, Ric Wake for W&R Group, Rafael Pérez-Botija, Ricardo "Eddy" Martínez and Jean B. Smit
- Executive producer: Angel Carrasco
- A&R: Paul Forat
- Mastering: Bernie Grundman by Chris Bellman and Isaias G. Asbun
- Art direction: Pamela Postigo Uribe
- Art design: Sol Sancristóbal
- Style: Claudia Sánchez and Miriam Sainos
- Photography: Adolfo Pérez Buitrón

== Sales and certifications ==
Region	Certification	Certified units/sales
Mexico (AMPROFON)	Gold	75,000^{^}
^{^} Shipments figures based on certification alone.
