= Antonio Velasco Piña =

Mexican novelist, spiritual writer, and essayist (1935–2020)

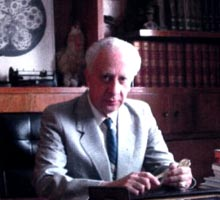

Antonio Velasco Piña (8 September 1935 – 27 December 2020) was a Mexican novelist, spiritual writer, essayist, lawyer and historian.

He was the founder of La Nueva Mexicanidad, a group advocating the Mexicanist or Mexicanista (Mexicayotl) movement purportedly based on Aztec religion and Aztec superiority over all other Americas indigenous tribes. The movement is partly inspired by the writings of French anthropologist Laurette Séjourné who specialized on Aztec and Mesoamerican spirituality.

El círculo negro (2005) presents a conspiracy theory according to which Mexico during the mid 20th century was governed by a secret society called "The Black Circle", the descendants of The Aztec Triple Alliance Elite which supposedly assassinated Mexican presidents who sought reelection, rewriting history and propagandizing Aztec culture over all Mexicans and American Chicanos.

Piña died from COVID-19 on 27 December, 2020 in Mexico City.

== Bibliography ==
- Aníbal y Escipión (2013)
- El retorno de las águilas y los jaguares (2012)
- Los siete rayos (2010)
- Dos guerreros olmecas (2010)
- Cartas a Elisabeth (2009)
- El retorno de lo sagrado (2009)
- El Círculo Negro (2005)
- San Judas Tadeo
- Regina - Dos de octubre no se olvida (1987)
- El despertar de Teotihuacán (1994)
- Tlacaélel, el azteca entre los aztecas
- La mujer dormida debe dar a luz
