= Fuego y Ternura =

Studio album by Lucerito
- Released: 27 May 1985
- Recorded: 1984–1985
- Genre: Pop
- Label: Musart
- Producers: Jaime Sánchez Rosaldo, Luigi Lazareno, Larry Muhoberac, Javier Alurralde

Lucerito chronology
Fiebre de amor (1985)	Fuego y Ternura (1985)	Un Pedacito de Mí (1986)

Singles from Fuego y Ternura
- 1. "Fuego y Ternura" Released: 7 March 1985; 2. "Magia" Released: 11 June 1985; 3. "Siempre te seguiré" Released: 8 September 1985

Fuego y Ternura is the third studio album from Mexican singer and actress Lucerito. It was released on 1985. Lucerito started to be recognized in an international level with this album. For the Spotify version of the album, the title was changed to Magia and features a different album cover and track list.

== Track listing ==
The album is composed of ten songs; all of them were arranged by different songwriters, among them Joan Sebastian.

No.	Title	Writer(s)	Length
1.	"Magia"	Nicolás Urquiza	3:20
2.	"Bailando Con Tu Recuerdo"	Joan Sebastian	3:05
3.	"El Amor Tocó a Mi Puerta"	Omar Alfanno	3:09
4.	"Tu Amor Por Un Día"	Sue & Javier	3:03
5.	"Así de Simple"	Sue & Javier	2:59
6.	"Fuego y Ternura"	Prisma	3:19
7.	"Siempre Te Seguiré"	Luis Rey	3:01
8.	"Yo Siento"	Alfanno	3:16
9.	"Esta Melodía"	Alfanno	3:04
10.	"Dame, Dame"	Urquiza	3:15

Spotify version
No.	Title	Writer(s)	Length
1.	"Fuego y Ternura"	Prisma	3:17
2.	"Magia"	Urquiza	3:19
3.	"Tu Amor Por Un Día"	Sue & Javier	3:02
4.	"Con Tan Pocos Años"	Sergio Andrade	3:08
5.	"Dame, Dame"	Urquiza	3:14
6.	"Siempre Te Seguiré"	Rey	2:59
7.	"Él"	Andrade	3:04
8.	"Como Música de Rock'n'Roll"		3:21
9.	"Bailando Con Tu Recuerdo"	Sebastian	3:04
10.	"Te Prometo"	Andrade	3:04
11.	"América, Esta Es Tu Canción"		3:13
12.	"El Amor Tocó a Mi Puerta"	Alfanno	3:09

== Singles ==
#	Title	B-sides	Date
1.	"Fuego y ternura"	"Bailando con tu recuerdo"	1985
2.	"Magia"	"El amor tocó a mi puerta"	1985
3.	"Siempre te seguiré"	"Dame, dame"	1985

== Sales ==
Lucero manages to sell over 350,000 units, of which 80,000 were sold in Mexico and U.S.A., reaching the status of platinum disc.
