= Lucero de México =

Studio album by Lucero
- Released: 25 February 1992
- Recorded: 1991–1992
- Genres: Mariachi; ranchera
- Label: Melody
- Producer: Rubén Fuentes

Lucero chronology
Sólo Pienso En Ti (1991)	Lucero de México (1992)	Lucero (1993)

Alternative cover

Singles from Lucero de México
- 1. "Llorar" Released: 22 January 1992; 2. "Que no quede huella" Released: 29 May 1992; 3. "Tristes Recuerdos" Released: 21 August 1992

Lucero de México (Lucero of Mexico) is the ninth album from Mexican singer and actress Lucero, and her second mariachi album. It was released in 1992. It is one of the best selling albums of mariachi music in Mexican history, with sales of over two million copies.

== Track listing ==
The album is composed by 12 songs, all of them were arranged by different songwriters.

No.	Title	Writer(s)	Length
1.	"Como Fui a Enamorarme de Ti"	Marco Antonio Solís	03:36
2.	"Llorar"	Joan Sebastian	02:46
3.	"Que No Quede Huella"	José Guadalupe Esparza	03:31
4.	"Tu Infame Engaño"	Gustavo Ángel Alba	03:16
5.	"Como Duele"	Esparza	03:31
6.	"Tristes Recuerdos"	Catarino Lara	03:31
7.	"Pétalo Y Espinas"	Jesús Navarrete	03:21
8.	"Contigo O Sin Ti"	Sebastian	02:43
9.	"Tu Presa Fácil"	Navarrete	05:24
10.	"Corazón Duro"	Esparza	02:47
11.	"Verdad Que Duele"	Joan Sebastian	02:34
12.	"Me Estoy Volviendo Loca"	José Javier Solís	03:11

== Singles ==
#	Title	Mex.	Hot Lat.
1.	"Llorar"	#1	#29
2.	"Que no quede huella"	#5	n/a
3.	"Tristes Recuerdos"	#15	n/a

== Chart performance ==
This was the third album of Lucero that entered to the list of Billboard and the first that charted in 2 different lists. The album stayed in the chart of the Top Latin Albums just for 2 weeks peaking at #45; and it stayed in the Regional Mexican Albums for 21 weeks, peaking at No. 6.

Chart	Peak
Billboard Reg. Mex. Albums	6
Billboard Top Latin Albums	45
