= Lucero en Vivo Auditorio Nacional =

Live album by Lucero
- Released: 26 September 2007
- Recorded: 25 March 2007
- Genres: Pop, mariachi
- Label: EMI
- Director: Antonio Hogaza León

Lucero chronology
Quiereme Tal Como Soy (2006)	Lucero en Vivo Auditorio Nacional (2007)	Indispensable (2010)

Lucero live albums chronology
Un Lucero en La México (1999)	Lucero en Vivo Auditorio Nacional (2007)	Lucero en Concierto (2013)

Singles from Lucero En Vivo Auditorio Nacional
- 1. "Popurrí K-Paz" Released: 23 July 2007; 2. "Amante bandido" Released: 6 December 2007

Lucero en Vivo Auditorio Nacional is the second live album by Mexican and actress singer Lucero, released on 26 September 2007 by EMI. It was recorded in Mexico City in the Auditorio Nacional during the promotion of her album Quiéreme Tal Como Soy on 25 March 2007. It was released in two different formats, one contained a double-disc CD, and the other one, a double-DVD format. The first disc, contains the pop part of the concert, and the second one has the mariachi part. The concert was directed by her brother Antonio Hogaza León and Guillermo Gil.

== Track listing ==
The album is composed by 23 songs in the CD format, divided into two discs, one for pop and the other one for rancheras. The DVD version contains 24 tracks and is divided also into two discs as well, one of pop and the other of mariachi. The difference is a track called Son de La Negra that works as a break at the beginning of the second DVD.

Pop (Disc 1)
No.	Title	Length
1.	"O Tú o Nada"	03:31
2.	"Veleta"	03:45
3.	"Sobreviviré"	03:12
4.	"La Gata Bajo la Lluvia"	03:22
5.	"Qué Pasará Mañana"	03:09
6.	"Medley; El Número Uno • Amor Secreto • Tanto • Corazón a la Deriva"	06:16
7.	"Ya No"	03:15
8.	"Electricidad"	04:23
9.	"Amante Bandido"	04:32
10.	"Medley; Historias de Amores • Cuéntame • Vete con Ella"	10:45
11.	"Tacticas de Guerra"	03:37
12.	"La Única Que Te Entiende"	03:32

Mariachi (Disc 2)
No.	Title	Length
1.	"Llorar"	02:42
2.	"Cielo Rojo"	04:20
3.	"Amanecí En Tus Brazos"	04:02
4.	"La Camisa Negra"	03:35
5.	"Medley Kumbia (Mi Dulce Niña • Sabes a Chocolate • Chiquilla)"	07:19
6.	"Árboles de la Barranca"	03:13
7.	"Tristes Recuerdos"	04:17
8.	"Vete Por Donde Llegaste (Jugo de Piña)"	03:42
9.	"Medley K-Paz (Mi Credo • Pero Te Vas a Arrepentir)"	04:44
10.	"Que Te Ruegue Quien Te Quiera"	03:09
11.	"Medley (La Puerta Negra • La Culebra)"	03:23

Sample credits

- Track 12, "La única que te entiende", this live version contains a sample from Bad Girls by Donna Summer.

== Charts ==
On the October 1, 2007 issue of the AMPROFON Mexican Top 100, the album debuted at number 37. It reached #25 as peak position, staying for 10 weeks in the chart

Chart	Peak
Mexican Album Chart	25
