= Fiebre de amor =

- Poster
- Directed by: René Cardona Jr.
- Produced by: René Cardona Jr.
- Starring: Lucerito; Luis Miguel; Guillermo Murray; Lorena Velázquez
- Distributed by: Televicine
- Release date: 1985
- Country: Mexico
- Language: Spanish

Fiebre de amor ('Love Fever') is a 1985 Mexican musical drama film. This film won the Diosa Award for best picture.

== Plot ==
A teenage girl with a crush on a young popular singing star daydreams about meeting and falling in love with him. She accidentally witnesses a mob murder and while attempting to escape the perpetrators she hides in a hotel bungalow. This happens to be the bungalow of her favorite singer and he gets roped into her escape from these men. The young star comes to her rescue in this romantic comedy with many songs and the Acapulco scenery as a backdrop.

== Cast ==
- Lucero as Lucerito
- Luis Miguel as himself
- Lorena Velázquez
- Guillermo Murray
- Maribel Fernández
- Carlos Monden
- Monica Sanchez Navarro

== Soundtrack ==
A soundtrack was released in 1985, with Luis Miguel and Lucerito as the only performers.
