= Mexican pop music =

Music genre

Mexican pop
- Stylistic origins: 1700s – 1790s: Indigenous music of North America; List of Mexican composers of classical music; List of Mexican operas; 1800s – 1890s: Ballad; Folk; Son jarocho; Son huasteco; 1910s – 1920s: Corrido; Norteño; Banda music; 1930s – 1940s: Ranchera; Mariachi; Bolero; Danzón; 1950s – 1960s: Pop music; Latin pop; Latin ballad; Rock and Roll; Chicano rock; Rock en Español; Latin rock; 1970s – 1980s: Grupera; Mexican rock music; Mexican cumbia; Disco; Dance Music; 1990s – 2000s: Duranguense; Tejano music; Latin hip hop; Corridos tumbados
- Cultural origins: United States, and Mexico (1930s)

Other topics
- Mexican music; Regional styles of Mexican music; Latin American music in the United States; Latin jazz

Mexican pop is a music genre produced in Mexico, particularly intended for teenagers and young adults.

Mexico is the country that exports the most entertainment in Spanish language. Mexican pop was limited to Latin America until the mid-1990s, when an interest towards this type of music increased after Selena's, Luis Miguel's, Paulina Rubio's, Thalía's and Angélica María's debuts before the mainstream USA audience.

In the southwestern United States, Spanish guitar rhythms and Mexican musical influences may have inspired some of the music of American musicians Ritchie Valens, Danny Flores (of The Champs), Sam the Sham, Roy Orbison and later, Herb Alpert. Initially, the public exhibited only moderate interest in them, because the media attention was focused on La Ola Inglesa (British Invasion). Mexican artis of the time were Lucha Reyes, María Luisa Landín, Fernando Fernández, and Luis Pérez Meza in the 1940s. Agustin Lara is recognized as one of the most popular songwriters of his era together with Consuelo Velázquez.

In 1954 Andy Russell, relocated to Mexico where he became a star of radio, television, motion pictures, records and nightclubs. During the 1960s and 1970s, most of the pop music produced in Mexico consisted on Spanish-language versions of English-language rock-and-roll hits. Singers and musical groups like César Costa, Angélica María, Enrique Guzmán, Alberto Vázquez, Manolo Muñoz, Johnny Laboriel, Julissa or Los Teen Tops performed cover versions of songs by Elvis Presley, Nancy Sinatra, Paul Anka, Joan Baez and others. However, after the substantial success of Mexican-American guitarist Carlos Santana in the United States in the late 1960s, a large number of bands sprang up. Most of these bands sang in both Spanish and English, keeping foreign commercial exposure in mind.

== 1970s and 1980s ==
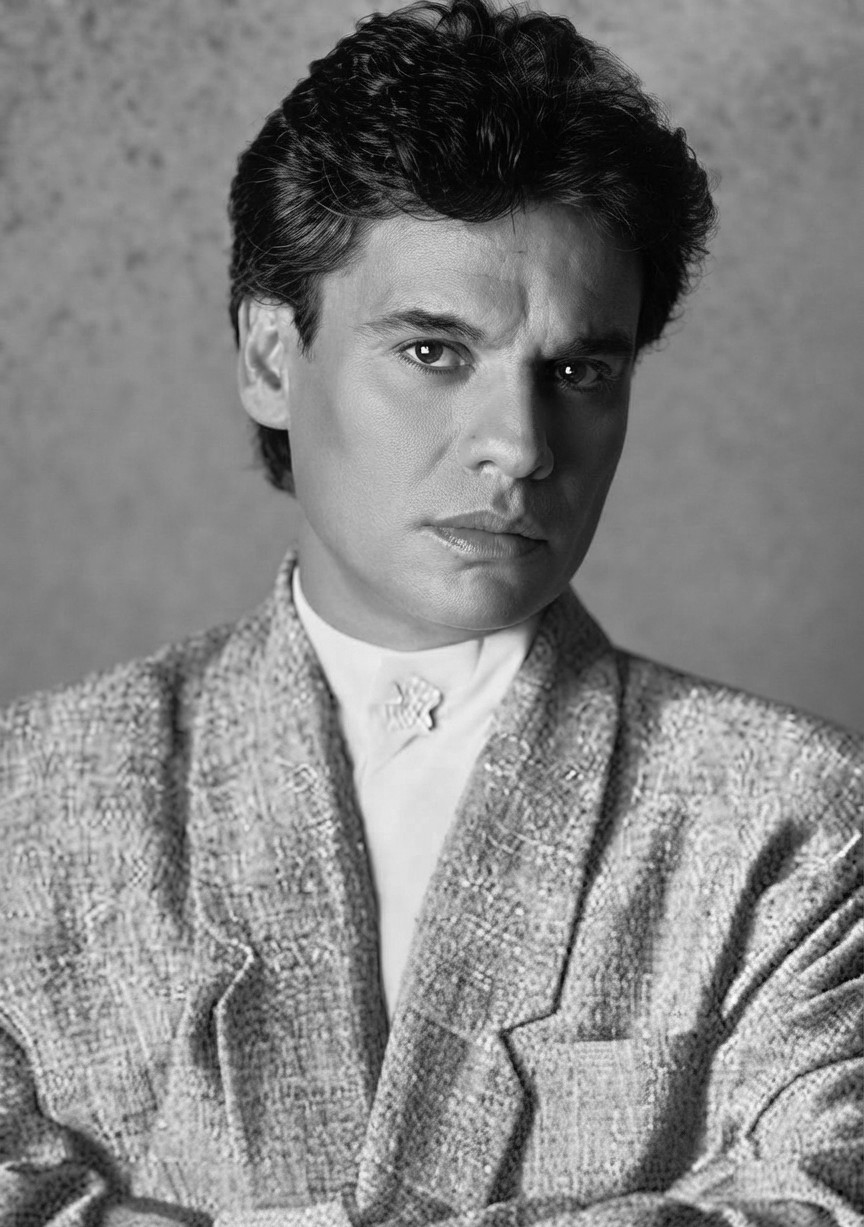
Legendary Mexican music icon, Juan Gabriel

On September 13, 1969, Televisa, a Mexican company and the world's largest Spanish-language television network launched the variety show Siempre en Domingo (Always on Sundays) hosted by Raúl Velasco. Siempre en Domingo became one of the most popular TV shows in Latin America with about 420 million television viewers around the world (according to Televisa and their partners). Siempre en Domingo was a TV show where many artists performed and debuted. At the time, an appearance was a hallmark of success and performers considered an appearance on the program as a guarantee of stardom similar to The Ed Sullivan Show in the United States. Velasco encouraged many Mexican singers such as Lucía Méndez, Lucero, Emmanuel, Mijares, Gloria Trevi, Timbiriche, and Lorenzo Antonio, and helped many of these to become full-fledged stars within the county. Moreover, Velasco presented foreign artists such as Julio Iglesias, Raphael, Miguel Bosé, Chayanne and Ricky Martin. Artists that would bring pop music to Latin America, were, in part by Siempre en Domingo, helped in that effort thanks for their appearances in the program.

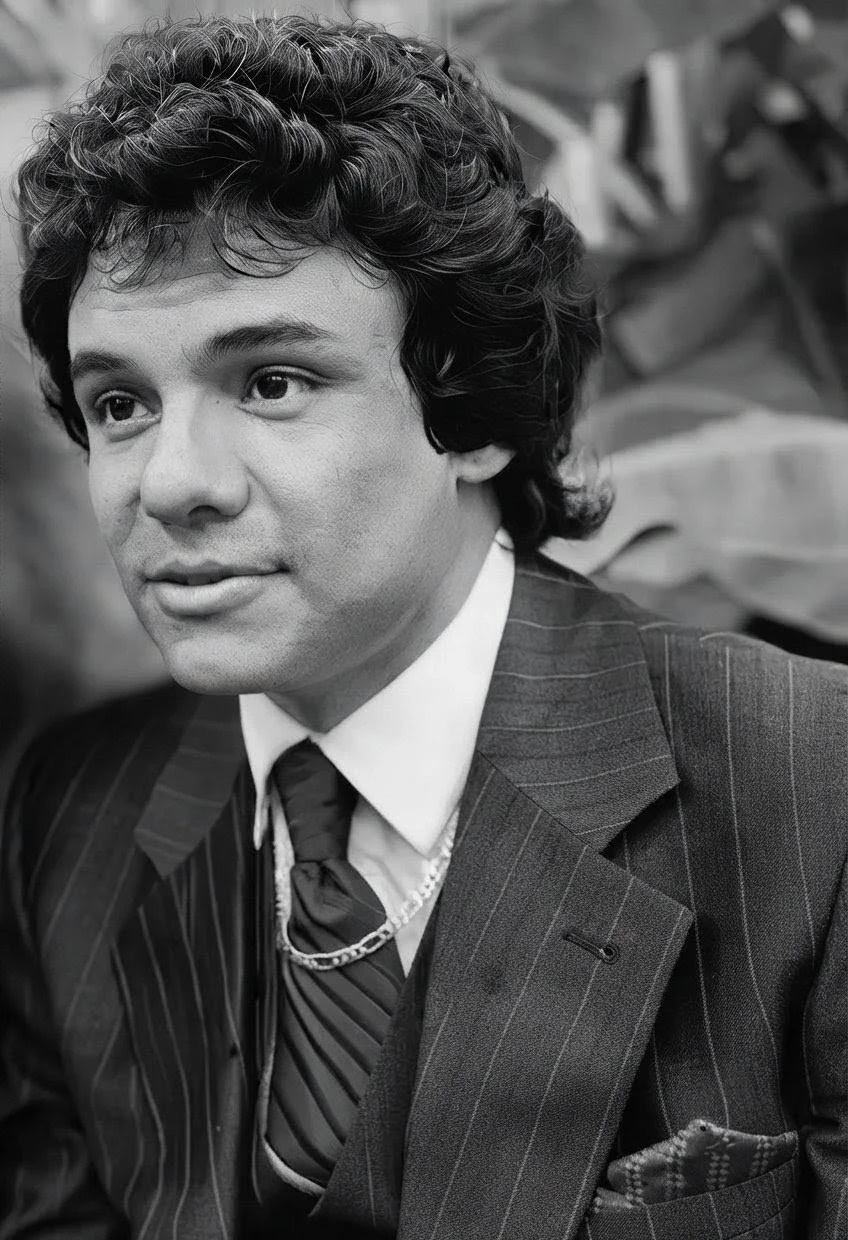
José José was named "El Príncipe de la Canción" ("The Prince of Song")

In 1970 Jose Jose jumped to fame when he sang "El Triste" at the Festival de la Canción Latina. He didn't win the prestigious singing contest but his performance was so memorable that fans across Latin America considered him the actual winner.

The romantic balada, which gained popularity in the 1970s, continued to dominate the Latin music charts in the 1980s. Veteran balladeers who continued to be popular in this decade include Julio Iglesias, José José, Roberto Carlos, and Juan Gabriel. The Latin balada is characterized by its bolero origin by fusing music from the United States with pop, R&B, and rock.

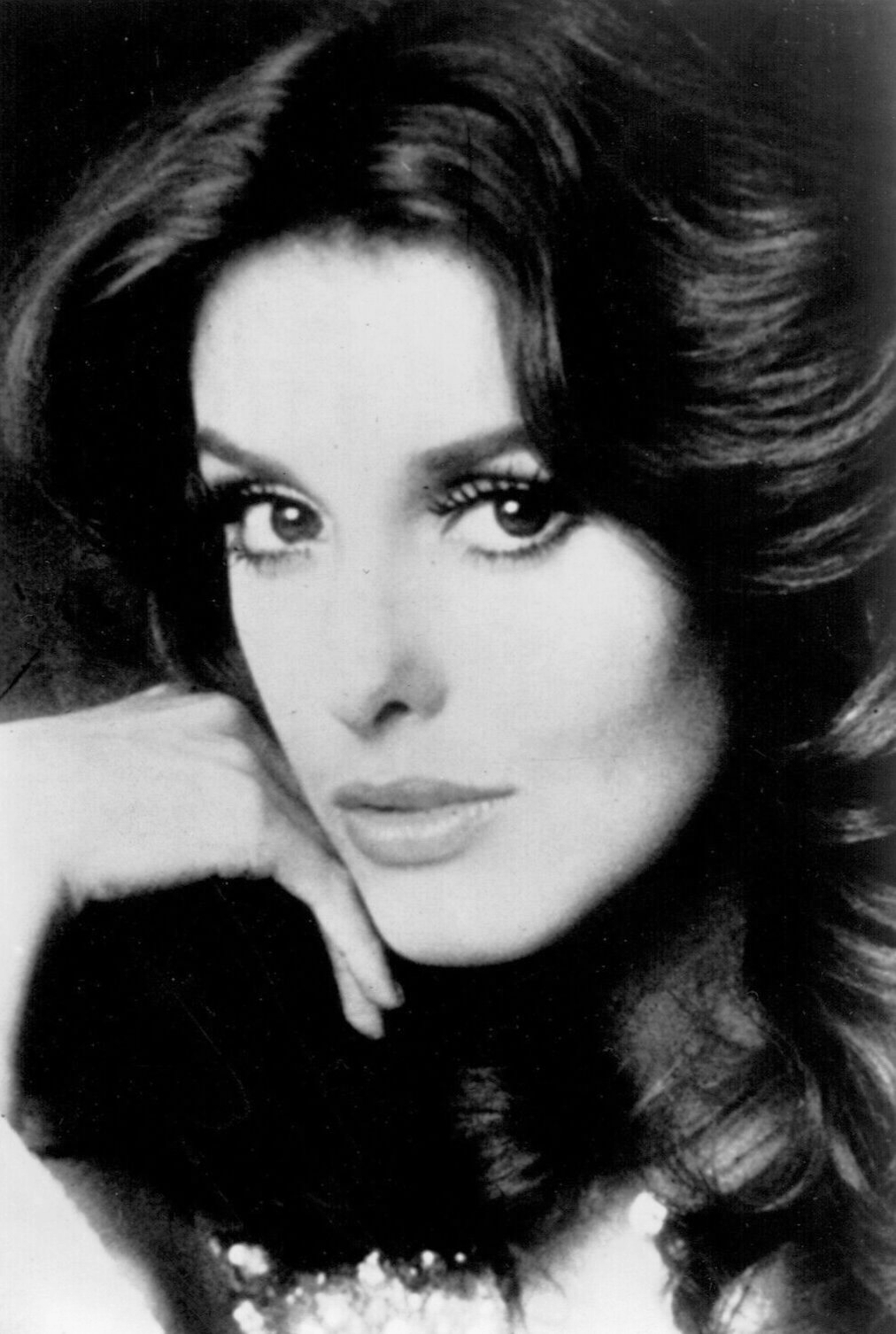
Lucía Méndez, actress and singer

Female balada singers that became topped the Latin music charts includes Ana Gabriel, Daniela Romo, Rocío Dúrcal, Gloria Estefan, and Marisela. Notably, several baladas were Spanish-language covers of songs originally performed in Italian. Notable Spanish-language covers of Italian songs include "Maldita primavera" by Yuri, "Toda la Vida" by Emmanuel, "Yo No Te Pido la Luna" by Daniela Romo, and "Tan Enamorados" by Ricardo Montaner.

The 1980s gave rise to the teenage groups Menudo, Timbiriche, and Los Chicos, as well as emerging teenage stars such as Luis Miguel and Alejandra Ávalos. By 1988, however, the aforementioned Luis Miguel would transform into an adult superstar at age 18 with the hit La Incondicional (1989). Not too far behind was former Los Chicos' member Chayanne as he became a leading pop star by the end of the decade, with his 1987 hit Fiesta en America. As young stars begin to rise in Latin music, veterans such as Julio Iglesias, José José, Juan Gabriel, and José Luis Rodríguez El Puma continue their dominance in Latin music. Tejano Music starts to give little rise after Mazz crosses over to Mexico after their albums Una Noche Juntos and No Te Olvidare win Grammys.

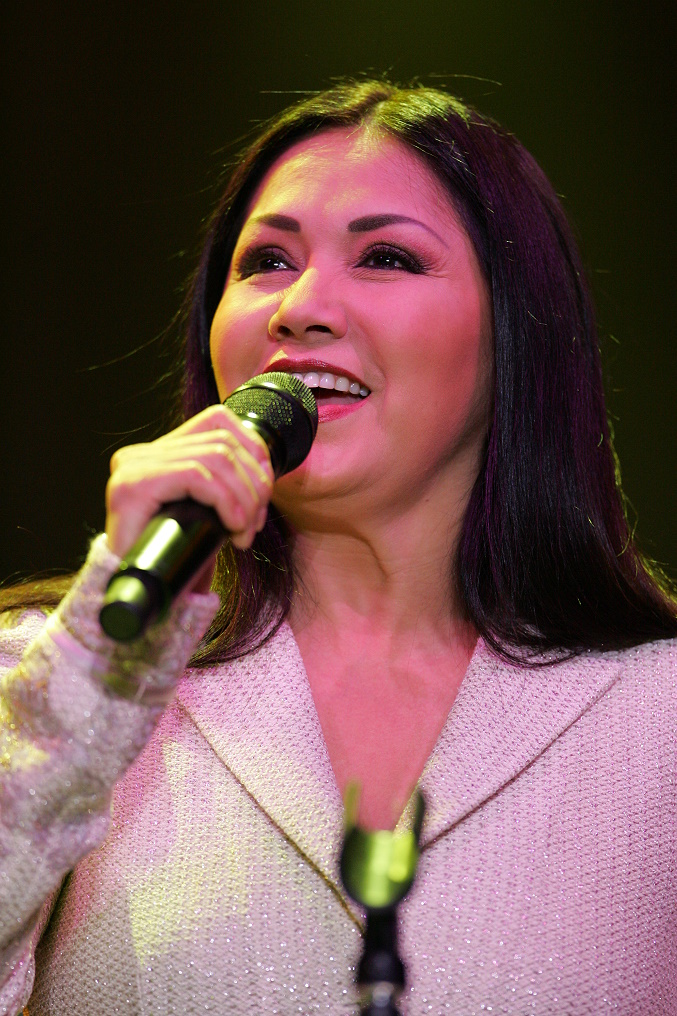
"Ay Amor" by Mexican singer Ana Gabriel (right) was the best-performing Latin song of 1988. It also spent 14 weeks on top of the Billboard Hot Latin Tracks chart.

Aside from the baladas, several Latin pop artists and bands performed variety of Spanish-language pop and dance music targeted to the younger audience. These include Yuri, Marisela, Mecano, Miguel Bosé, Timbiriche, Menudo, and Flans. "Que Te Pasa" became the longest-running chart of the 1980s, spending 16 weeks on top of the Billboard Hot Latin Tracks chart. Juan Gabriel and Rocío Dúrcal collaborated with Chuck Anderson to incorporate mariachi arrangements on their ballads. Child pop singers such as Luis Miguel, Pedrito Fernández, and Lucerito had a prepubescent following.

During the 1980s songwriters like Guillermo Méndez Guiú, Rafael Pérez Botija or Aureo Baqueiro wrote songs for singers like Yuri, Lucía Méndez and musical groups like Timbiriche, Flans and Fandango. These groups headed the radio charts in Mexico and launched international career by promoting their music in Latin America. Other pop music icons in Mexico during the 1980s include José María Napoleón, Magneto, Dulce, Franco de Vita, Juan Luis Guerra, Isabel Pantoja, Ana Torroja and Rocío Dúrcal. Although not all of these singers are from Mexico.

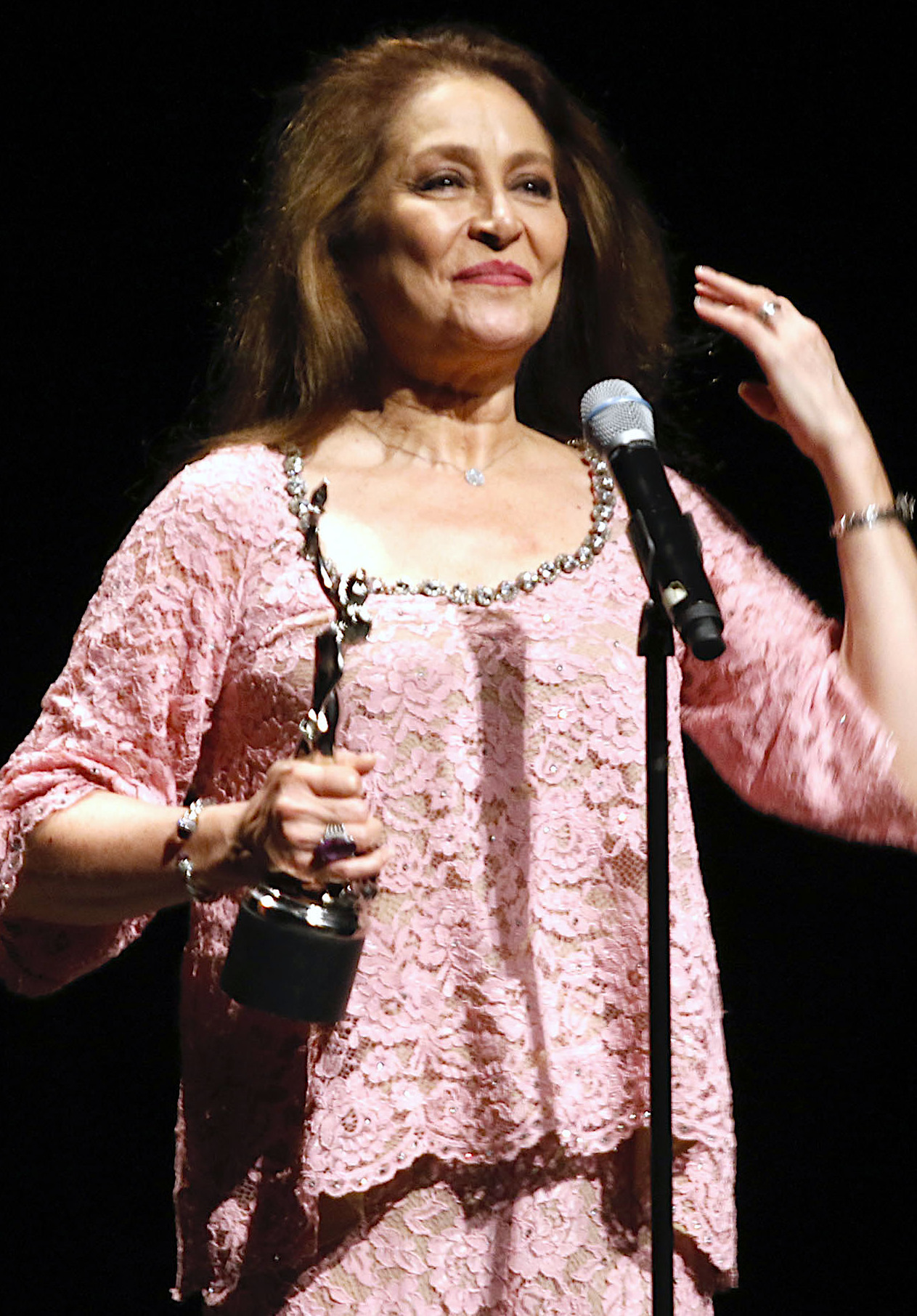
Daniela Romo

The most well-known Mexican singer of the 1970s and 1980s was José José. Known as "El Principe de La Cancion" (The Prince of the Song), he is recognizable for his romantic ballads and gifted vocals. José José has sold over 100 million albums in his career and became a huge influence to very popular singers like: Cristian Castro, Vicente Fernández, Alejandro Fernández, Pepe Aguilar, Manuel Mijares, Lupita D'Alessio, Reyli, and Nelson Ned.

When Thalía became part of Timbiriche in the 1980s, tension with Paulina a group member became instantaneous and the rivalry to monopolize the lead role was warming the atmosphere and culminated at a point in which they ended up graving each other's hairs on stage. Thalia and Paulina have frequently garnered comparisons ever since, even after the two directed their solo career. In which the media sets them up, competing for the title of Latin pop queen. Similar to the comparison between Christina Aguilera and Britney Spears in the American market who also both started as group membership at The Mickey Mouse Club.

In the 1980s, the regional music scene in both Mexico and the Mexican American community in the United States was dominated by grupera. This style of Mexican music combines cumbia, norteño, and rock music. The lyrics are rooted with romantic themes including heartbroken songs. Several notable grupera ensembles include Los Caminantes, Los Yonic's, Los Bukis, and Los Temerarios. Norteño band Los Tigres del Norte continued their success from the 1970s with their corridos involving social commentary such as "Jaula de oro" ("The Golden Cage") which tells of a Mexican man who crosses the Mexico-United States border illegally and raises a family in the United States who denies their Mexican heritage while the man longs to return to his country. Its parent album reached number one on the Regional Mexican charts in the United States. Similarly, Mexican singer-songwriter Joan Sebastian incorporated sounds of rancheras and ballads on his songs and was dubbed "El Rey del Jaripeo" ("The King of Mexican Rodeo").

Vicente Fernández and Ranchera music still remain relevant in the 1980s. His album, Por Tu Maldito Amor (1989), became the longest running number one Regional Mexican album of the decade in the United States with 21 weeks consecutive weeks at this position. American singer Linda Ronstadt, who is of Mexican descent, released Canciones de Mi Padre, a collection of songs that her father would sing. The album was certified double platinum by the RIAA for shipping over two million copies in the United States.

In 1985 Sheena Easton and Luis Miguel wins the Grammy Award for Best Mexican/Mexican-American Performance for "Me Gustas Tal Como Eres". Eugenia León, representing Mexico, wins the 14th Annual OTI Festival with her song "El Fandango Aquí" in 1986 Vikki Carr wins the Grammy Award for Best Mexican/Mexican-American Performance for Simplemente Mujer.

== 1990s ==
Latin boys band and vocal pop groups were storming up the charts in Mexico and Central America. Mexican boy band Magneto spawned hits in the early 1990s but split in 1996. In 1995, their successors Mercurio continued making top hits like Bye Bye Baby and Explota Corazón. MDO. Mexican pop groups Onda Vaselina and Kabah spanned several hits in the Latin American charts and made history in the Mexican charts. Jeans, Mexican pop girl group rose to fame in late 1996 and 1997 and continued until the 2000s.

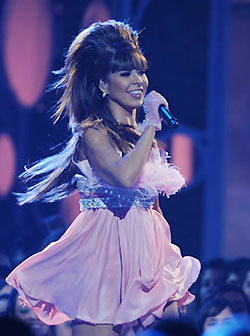
Gloria Trevi

Beginning in the 1990s, iconic pop act of the 1980s Timbiriche began to lose popularity mainly to the constant change of bandmembers, while Magneto stood stable in the music scene. Before the teen bubblegum pop explosion in the US during the late 1990s, many pop acts came to light during the mid-1990s in Mexico and became successful. Most of them lasted until the end of the decade. This includes boybands Mercurio, Ragazzi, Tierra Cero and Kairo, female singers Lynda Thomas, Fey, Alessandra Rosaldo, Jeans, Irán Castillo, Edith Márquez, Bibi Gaytan, Maria Jose, Patricia Manterola and boy/girl groups Pandora, Sentidos Opuestos, Onda Vaselina, Kabah, Sentidos Opuestos. Calo and the comeback of Timbiriche in 1998. Minor one-hit wonder acts were successful during this era which were also focused on a teen pop formula.

The 1991 4th Annual Lo Nuestro Awards are held at the James L. Knight Center in Miami, Florida. Mexican singer Ana Gabriel and Dominican group Juan Luis Guerra & 4.40 are the most awarded artists with three wins. Luis Miguel releases Romance, a collection of boleros previously recorded by other artists. The album's success led to a resurgence of interest in the bolero genre in the 1990s.

In 1992 Vikki Carr an American from El Paso, Texas, born to parents of Mexican ancestry won the Grammy Award for Best Latin Pop Album for Cosas del Amor an album with the lead single being a duet with Ana Gabriel of the same name. The track earned awards such as a Lo Nuestro Awards for Best Pop Song and the Single of the Year mention by the Radio y Música journal.

In 1993 Linda Ronstadt won the Grammy Award for Best Tropical Latin Album for her album Frenesí and the Grammy Award for Best Mexican-American Album for her album Mas Canciones.

Selena became the first non-crossover act to have an album (Amor Prohibido; released March 1994) to enter the Billboard 200 since Luis Miguel's Aries (1993). The album was credited with popularizing Tejano music and catapulting the genre into an "unprecedented level of mainstream success"; eventually becoming the best-selling Tejano record of all-time. It holds the record for most weeks in the top ten of the Top Latin Albums chart—at 110 weeks—while the record holds the record for most weeks at number one on the Regional Mexican Albums chart at 96 weeks.

By the early to mid 1990s, the torch for Mexican music was carried by another Mexican-American singer who had grown up speaking English and learned Spanish as a second language. Texas-born Selena was a Grammy Award winning Tejano singer, who also sang many genres. After bypassing all the Tejano barriers, she quickly earned the title "Queen of Tejano Music." Selena became the first Latin artist to have four number ones in one year in 1994. The four were Donde Quiera Que Estés, Amor Prohibido, Bidi Bidi Bom Bom and No Me Queda Mas. After her success in Spanish and winning a Grammy Award, Selena went to work on her very first English album. The irony was that English was Selena's first language, as she had grown up in Texas and Spanish was actually her second language. Sadly, Selena was murdered in March 1995.

Selena only recorded 4 songs for her crossover album and was scheduled to have 13 songs in English for her album. The crossover album titled Dreaming of You was released in the summer of 1995. It quickly became an International Success. Selena's songs Dreaming of You and I Could Fall In Love quickly became crossover hits on American English language Top-40 and Adult Contemporary radio stations, with the single "Dreaming of You" also certified Gold. The album became among the "Top ten best-selling debuts of all time" along with being the "Best-selling debuts for a Latín Female artist." Selena became the first Latin Artist, male or female, to have ever debuted at No. 1 on the Billboard 200 all-genres album chart. This career achievement helped create the Latín boom in the late 1990s.

Luis Miguel "El sol de Mexico" (The Sun of Mexico) in Mexico City.

In 1995 Luis Miguel won the Grammy Award for Best Latin Pop Performance for his album Segundo Romance and Vikki Carr wins the Grammy Award for Best Mexican-American Performance for her album Recuerdo a Javier Solís.

In 1996 the third annual Billboard Latin Music Awards are also held on May. Selena becomes the most awarded artist of the award ceremony, receiving four award posthumously including Hot Latin Tracks Artist of the Year. Mexican singer Juan Gabriel is inducted into the Billboard Latin Music Hall of Fame.

In the late 1990s, Ricky Martin's success in Europe with the hit María and the international launch of 1998 World Cup's theme song, The Cup of Life, and Enrique Iglesias success launched a renewed interest in Latin American music. Mexican pop music started to look attractive to international markets.

The most successful Mexican singer of the 1990s was Luis Miguel. Best known for his technically skilled and smooth crooning vocals, Luis Miguel's super-stardom began since the late 1980s. In 1991, his career went to even greater heights and earned him the respect of a wider audience with the release of Romance, an album of romantic boleros. Most of them were from the 1940s and 1950s. Despite singing boleros from years past, Luis Miguel was recognized for reinventing the bolero for modern audiences. The album Romance, which became his most successful album ever, eventually sold 15 million units worldwide. Luis Miguel has successfully performed pop music, bolero, mariachi and romantic ballads. He has won four Latin Grammy Awards, five Grammy Awards, and has sold an estimate of 90 million albums until today. He is known in Latin America and Spain as "El Sol de México" (The Sun of Mexico).

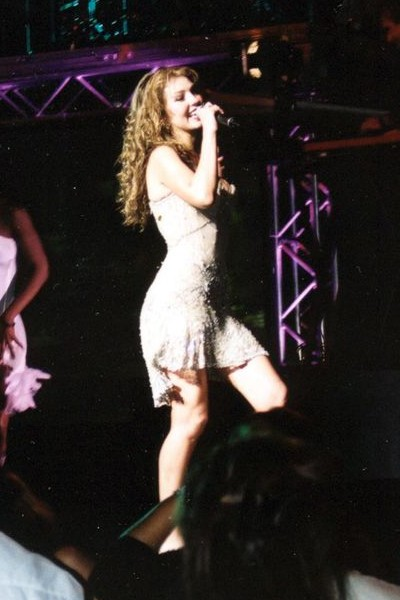
Thalía rose to fame as a member of the musical group Timbiriche.

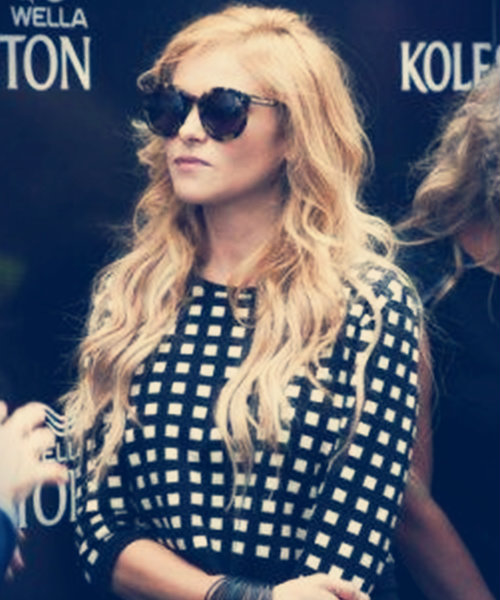
Paulina Rubio rose to fame as a member of the musical group Timbiriche.

Mexican singer José José is inducted into the Billboard Latin Music Hall of Fame in 1997 and Mexican singer Vicente Fernández is inducted into the Billboard Latin Music of Fame in 1998. Alejandro Fernández is the biggest winner with five awards at the 10th Annual Lo Nuestro Awards.

Thalía often referred to as the "Queen of Latin Pop" Televisa has exported media to many countries. This has allowed Mexican actors to take advantage of their popularity to launch music careers in countries where Televisa telenovelas are popular. Some examples of these actors are Lucía Méndez, Verónica Castro and Guillermo Capetillo. Verónica's son, Cristian Castro, started his career around this time and became popular throughout Latin America.

The most successful singer to combine ranchera, mariachi and pop music was Alejandro Fernández. He originally specialized in traditional, earthy forms of Mexican folk and country music. However, his later work was focused on mainstream pop music.

Singers such as Pepe Aguilar, Paulina Rubio, Gloria Trevi, and Aracely Arámbula have also produced songs that combine traditional Mexican music with popular music. The Mexican pop singers who were very successful in Mexico and the rest of North America, Latin America, Europe and Asia are Thalía, Gloria Trevi and Paulina Rubio.

The idea of creating a pop band after a telenovela was first explored in 1991 with the cast of Muñecos de Papel (With Ricky Martin, Angélica Rivera, and former Timbiriche members Sasha Sokol and Erik Rubin). In 1999, the same formula was explored with the telenovela DKDA with Alessandra Rossaldo (then member of Sentidos Opuestos), Patricio Borghetti and Ernesto D'Alessio. This formula would be explored again in 2004 with the creation of the most successful group in Latinamerica RBD.

== 2000s and 2010s ==
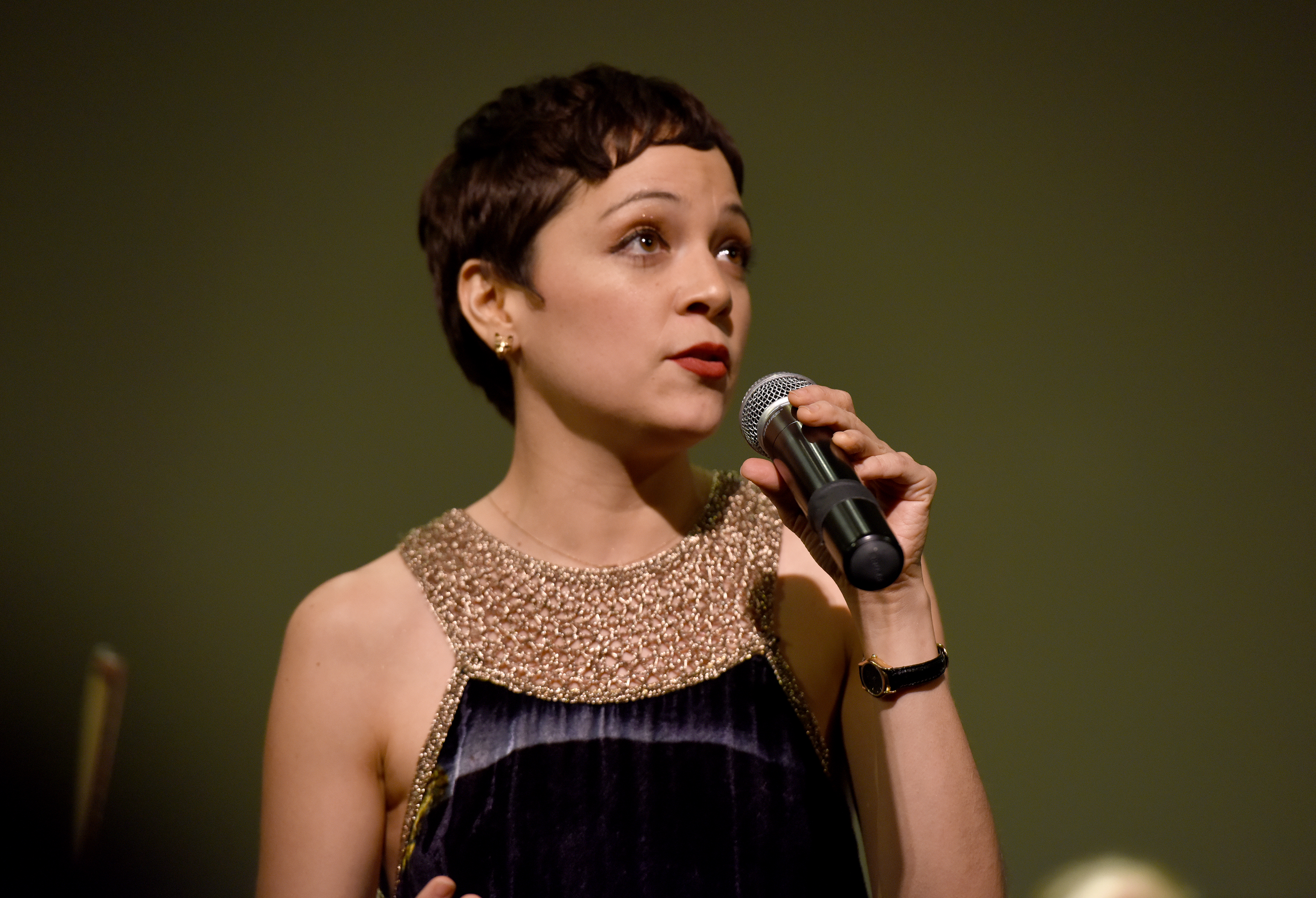
Natalia Lafourcade since her debut in 2003 has been one of the most successful singers in the pop rock scene in Latin America.

In 2000, Gloria Trevi, Andrade, and backup singer Maria Raquenel Portillo were arrested in Rio de Janeiro, Brazil, on charges of corrupting minors. Trevi was cleared of the charges in 2004, due to lack of evidence, after spending four years and eight months in prison.

The century saw new groups Sin Bandera, RBD, Belanova, Playa Limbo, and Jotdog as well as new and solo debut singers like Dulce Maria, Anahí, Spanish singer Belinda, Maite Perroni, Julieta Venegas, Ximena Sariñana and Kika Edgar. Performance by Reyli for the song "Amor Del Bueno" Yuridia for the song "Como Yo Nadie Te Ha Amado" the Spanish version of the song "This Ain't a Love Song" also saw great success and Daniela Lujan.

Also Pop Music faces competition from other genres such as Banda, Norteño or Pasito duranguense and even from Puerto Rican Reggaeton. The biggest issue is the hard pressure that piracy is giving to Mexican market.

In 2000 Amarte Es un Placer by Luis Miguel won the Latin Grammy Award for Album of the Year.

This century also saw the crossover of some of Mexican recording artist like Paulina Rubio and Thalía into the English music industry, with bilingual albums, compilation album, that included hit songs in English and Spanish language.

In 2010 Mexican pop group Camila won the Latin Grammy Award for Record of the Year for "Mientes" while Mario Domm and Monica Velez won the Latin Grammy Award for Song of the Year for the song.

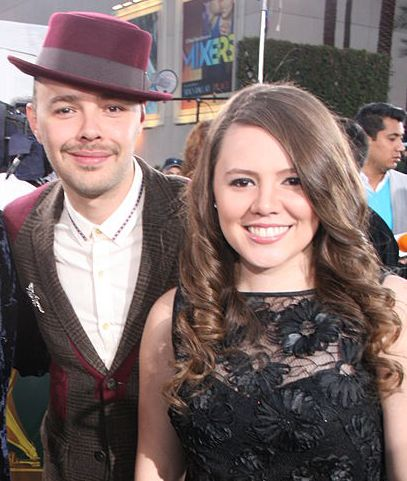
Jesse & Joy at the 13th Annual Latin Grammy Awards. In 2017 they won the Grammy Award for Best Latin Pop Album for Un Besito Más.

"¡Corre!" by Jesse & Joy won the Record the Year and Song of the Year at the 13th Annual Latin Grammy Awards. Thalia collaborated with legendary American singer of traditional pop standards Tony Bennett in a duet for the song The Way You Look Tonight.

Viva Duets is the studio album by Tony Bennett, released in October 2012. Thalia's first English-language album Thalia, shares a title with Thalía's 1990 and 2002 Spanish-language albums. "I Want You" was the album's most popular song, peaking at number 22 on the Billboard Hot 100 and number 7 in the Mainstream chart. It is her only song to date that has charted within the Billboard Hot 100. In Greece, the song peaked number twenty-six in Top 50 singles sales. The Spanish version of the song, "I Want You" was released for the Spanish-languaged audience and also perform quite well on the Latin Charts, peaking within the top ten of the Hot Latin Tracks at number nine.

Vicente Fernandez, Mexico's singer of traditional pop ranchera standards, also dueted with Tony Bennett in the song Return To Me (Regresa a Mí).

Foreign pop artists have had success in Mexico. In May 2013, Christina Aguilera appeared on Mexican singer Alejandro Fernández's cover of "Hoy Tengo Ganas de Ti" from his album Confidencias.

On September 24, 2015, Mexican singer-songwriter Carla Morrison became the first female soloist in 22 weeks to enter the top 10 of Billboard Latin Digital Songs chart. "Hasta la Raíz" by Natalia Lafourcade wins Song of the Year and Record of the Year at the 16th Annual Latin Grammy Awards.

English singer Sophie Ellis-Bextor's 2016 album was inspired by a visit to Mexico, titled Familia (family). The singer posted a video in which she appears singing one of the songs of the disc call "Death of Love" next to a group of mariachi in Puerto Vallarta, México.

¡México Por Siempre! by Mexican singer Luis Miguel wins Best Regional Mexican Music Album at the 61st Annual Grammy Awards. "Me Niego" by Reik featuring Ozuna and Wisin wins Song of the Year and Collaboration of the Year at the Premio Lo Nuestro 2019. "Mi Persona Favorita" by Alejandro Sanz and Camila Cabello wins Record of the Year at the 20th Annual Latin Grammy Awards. Los Ángeles Azules featuring Natalia Lafourcade song "Nunca Es Suficiente" was the 10 Most-streamed songs for Latin music in the United States in 2019.

== 2020s ==
During the quarantine due to the COVID-19 pandemic, a new version of the song Resistire named Resistiré México was recorded featuring many well-known Mexican singers. It was a song and charity single recorded by the supergroup Artists for Mexico in 2020. It was confirmed that all revenue from "Resistiré México" when to help fight the COVID-19 pandemic in Mexico. Many artists reunite at 'Se Agradece' May 30 a virtual music festival organized by Mexican TV network TeleHit, to celebrate those who fight against COVID-19.

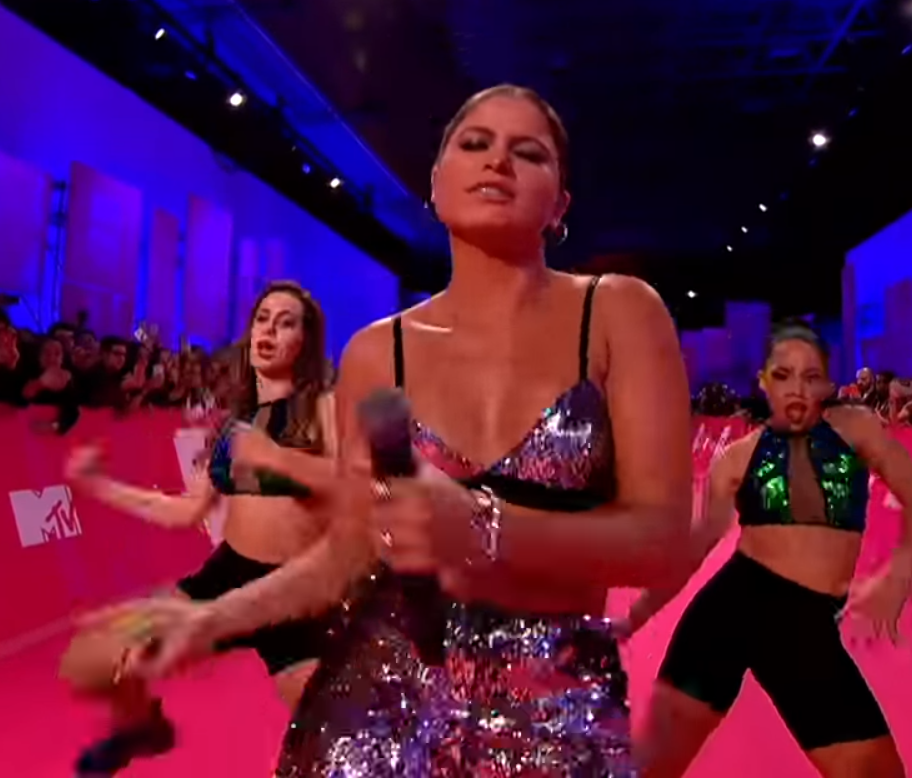
Sofia Reyes performs "1,2,3" at the 2018 MTV European Music Awards in Bilbao.

On April 26, 2020, Sofia Reyes would collaborate with Michael Bublé and the Barenaked Ladies to sing a cover of a song called "Gotta Be Patient" by Stay Homas featuring Judit Nedderman, for the Canadian benefit concert Stronger Together, Tous Ensemble in support of Food Banks Canada, healthcare and front-line workers during the COVID-19 pandemic, and in memory of the 2020 Nova Scotia attacks.

Lupita Infante granddaughter of Pedro Infante, and Mariachi Sol de México de José Hernández gave tribute to Pedro Infante singing "Amorcito Corazón" at the 21st Annual Latin Grammy Awards.

Silvana Estrada shared the 2022 Latin Grammy Award for Best New Artist with Angela Alvarez at the 23rd Annual Latin Grammy Awards.

In November 5 2023, Kenia Os wins Best Latin America North Act and on November 16 "De Todas las Flores" by Natalia Lafourcade won Record of the Year. In February 22 2024, Peso Pluma and Kenia Os win New Artist – Male and New Artist – Female, respectively at the Premio Lo Nuestro 2024.

== See also ==
- Latin Grammy Hall of Fame
- Top 100 Mexico
- List of best-selling albums in Mexico
- Regional Mexican
- Regional Mexican Airplay
