= Juguemos a Cantar =

Mexican compilation album

1er Festival Juguemos a Cantar

Compilation album by Various Artists
- Released: 1982
- Recorded: 1982
- Genre: Pop, Children, Post disco
- Label: Musart Records

Juguemos a Cantar (Let's play singing), was a children's competition festival that was held yearly in Mexico City beginning in 1982. Televisa produced this show, and it was transmitted on the program, Siempre En Domingo, which was hosted by Raúl Velasco. This competition was developed to seek out young talent, and was open to all Mexican resident children up to the age of 13. Juguemos a Cantar was first and foremost a "Festival De La Canción" (Festival of the Song), meaning that the songwriter and the song itself is celebrated along with the performer. All songs performed in the competition were required to be original, and the song writing is judged, as well as the artist performance. The popularity of its first transmission in 1982 made it one of the most important talent Festivals in all of Latin America. In the years it aired, it served to propel an impressive number of artists, such as: Lucero, Thalía, Edith Márquez, Eduardo Capetillo, and Lorenzo Antonio, as well as many songwriters, such as Omar Alfanno, Tirzo Paiz, Lorenzo Antonio, and Sergio Andrade.

== History ==
In 1981, Raúl Velasco, Alberto Del Bosque, and "Siempre En Domingo" teamed up with record company Discos Musart, to produce a show that would seek out young talent, and the idea of Jugemos a Cantar was born. At that time, "Siempre En Domingo" was one of the most popular programs in television history, and its main focus became this children's Festival. Discos Musart would also focus entirely on this project.

== 1er Festival Juguemos A Cantar ==
In late 1981, Raúl Velasco announced on "Siempre En Domingo" that they, along with Discos Musart, would be holding a children's talent competition. "Convocatorias" (entry forms), were distributed all across Mexico so that any child up to the age of 13 could enter by submitting a photo, and a cassette recording of themselves to Discos Musart. A committee then chose the 40 acts that were to compete in the televised portion of the festival. Over 3000 convocatorias were sent into Discos Musart.

The competition was held over the course of 5 weeks. The first 4 weeks were the “eliminatorias” (elimination rounds) and they were held at Televisa San Angel's Foro 2, and the 5th week was the grand final, which took place at Televisa Chapultepec on April 25, 1982.

One of the most misunderstood concepts about this 1er Festival Juguemos A Cantar is that it was first and foremost a "Festival De La Canción" (Festival of the Song), with a secondary (yet still very important) emphasis on how the performer interpreted the song as well. This can be seen in the way the prizes were distributed - the performer's prize was dependent on the winning song:

Prizes For The Composers (1982 Mexican pesos):

- 1st Place - $100,000.00
- 2nd Place - $75,000.00
- 3rd Place - $50,000.00

Prizes For The Performers Of The Winning Songs:

- 3 appearances on "Siempre En Domingo"
- A professional recording session (with Discos Musart)

=== The Top 10 ===
There were 10 acts that passed the elimination rounds and made it to the finals. Here are the standings for the 1er Festival Juguemos A Cantar competition, as well as the composers and songwriters as published on the original commemorative album of the Festival:

Final Standings of the 1er Festival Juguemos A Cantar
Place	Artist	Song	Songwriter	Arranger	Total Points (out of 100)
1	Lorenzo Antonio Y Su Grupo	Vamos A Jugar	Lorenzo Antonio	Julio Jaramillo	98
2	Byanka Y Maleza Katy	Igual Que El Universo La Risa De Las Vocales	Rosalía Sánchez A. Tirzo Paiz	Julio Jaramillo Gustavo A. Santiago	92
3	Grupo Ábaco	El Combate	Ma. Eugenia De Esesarte	Julio Jaramillo	90
4	Grupo Aventura Las Vicuñitas	Vamos A Mi Fiesta Fiesta En Mi Pueblo	José A. Garay Sergio Andrade	Julio Jaramillo Sergio Andrade	84
5	Yvette Y Monique	Rock And Roll	Francisco Curiel	Julio Jaramillo	83
6	Sara Eugenia Lolita Cortes	Si Yo Fuera Presidente Don Quijote Y Sancho Panza	Pedro Krishmar Ignacio Copani Martha Heredia	Jorge Neri Jorge Neri	82
7	Juanito Farias	Caballo De Palo	Omar Alfano	Chucho Ferrer	80

=== Impact ===
The impact of the 1er Festival Juguemos a Cantar was so great that in many ways, it was a moment that defined a generation of children. Most of the people that were children in 1982 remember this Festival very well with great happiness, as do the parents of those children. They remember where they were when the winners were announced. They remember many of the songs. The famous yellow album with two children holding balloons could be seen throughout Mexico in all the store fronts. Schools across Mexico held their own versions of a Juguemos A Cantar contest where the children would imitate their favorite participants of the Festival.

Due mostly to the success of this Festival, that year (1982), particularly in Mexico, the whole of the entertainment industry would become all about children and youth. Songs, radio, TV, and other entertainment media were all aimed at the children’s market. This "phenomenon" was so great that even the mainstream adult artists of that time had difficulty finding a spot in any and all forms of media.

The tremendous success of this first Festival was immense, but no one, including everyone involved, expected it to be as popular as it was. One obvious reason for its success was that it was heavily backed by Televisa, and by Discos Musart, but there were other factors as well:

- The amount of talent in this 1st festival was incredible. The competition between the top 10 was very close and very intense.
- 1st-place winners, Lorenzo Antonio Y Su Grupo, were huge crowd favorites because of the instruments they played (violins and harmonicas), their unique choreography, and their country/bluegrass sounding song, “Vamos A Jugar” (Let’s Play), which was about a dance move, “la mano izquierda va adelante y la derecha para atras” (the left hand goes in front and the right goes in back). Lorenzo Antonio was also the author of the song, making him the only “cantautor” (singer/songwriter) in the top 10.
- 2nd place was a tie between Byanka Y Maleza and Katy. Byanka Y Maleza were two sisters that had astounding voices as well as a beautiful song, “Igual Que El Universo” (The Same As The Universe). Katy was a very cute little girl that had a wonderful song about the vowels called “La Risa De Las Vocales,” and her charisma on stage made her very popular. Both were huge crowd favorites.
- 3rd-place winners, Grupo Abaco, had a very catchy song, “El Combate", written by Ma. Eugenia De Esesarte, which they performed with much enthusiasm and a great choreography.
- 4th place was a tie between Las Vicuñitas, who performed a song by Sergio Andrade, “Fiesta En Mi Pueblo", and Grupo Aventura, who performed a song by José A. Garay, “Vamos A Mi Fiesta". The former all played instruments, and the latter were a group of girls that sang and danced.
- 5th place was Yvette Y Monique (2 sisters that performed the song, “Rock And Roll” by Francisco Curiel),
- In 6th-place there was a tie between Lolita Cortes, who had already starred in the theater play, "Anita La Huerfanita", had a tremendous stage presence, and participated with the song, “Don Quijote Y Sancho Panza” written by Martha Heredia, and Sara Eugenia, a female soloist that sang “Si Yo Fuera Presidente” by Pedro Krishmar & Ignacio Copani.
- Juanito Farias very surprisingly ended up in 7th (last) place. A huge crowd favorite, Juanito performed the song, “Caballo De Palo” (Wooden Horse). He had a phenomenal voice, and during his performance at the final, something happened to his music track, and it completely cut out, leaving Juantio to finish his song a cappella. Juanito showed an enormous amount of poise and continued singing, proving that he was actually singing and not lip-synching like the rest of the participants. The crowd sang with him and cheered him on with much enthusiasm.Being that he was such a big crowd favorite, this sparked a controversy that still continues to this day.

==== The Controversy ====
After the results were announced, a great controversy ensued: Many people believed that Juanito Farias was robbed of first place, while others believed that Lorenzo Antonio Y Su Grupo won fair and square.

The people on the side of Lorenzo Antonio Y Su Grupo felt that the decision was fair because:

- Juguemos A Cantar was a "Festival De La Canción" (Festival Of The Song), therefore, Lorenzo Antonio was worthy of more consideration because he was the only finalist who wrote the song they participated with.
- Their song, “Vamos A Jugar,” was happy, up-tempo, and very positive. In contrast, Juanto Farias’ song, “Caballo De Palo,” was slow, more somber, and had a sad message.
- They played instruments (violins, violas, and harmonicas).
- They had choreography.
- The judges ultimately had them very far ahead in points from even the 2nd-place winners with an almost perfect 98 points (out of 100). Juanito came in a distant last place with 80 points.

The people on the side of Juanito Farias argued that he should have won because:

- He was the only participant that sang live, truly showing his vocal talent.
- He continued singing even after his track cut out.
- After the winners were announced, Raúl Velasco proclaimed Juanito, “El Mejor Interprete Del Festival” (The Best Singer Of The Festival). Juanito became known as “El Campeon Sin Corona” (The Champion With No Crown).

Had the Festival been more about vocal talent alone, Juanito Farias might have won. But this Festival was not solely about vocal talent. It was about the Song, the interpretation of the Song, and about happiness and children. The fact that Lorenzo Antonio wrote "Vamos A Jugar" gave Lorenzo Antonio Y Su Grupo a considerable edge over Juanito Farias, and all the other participants. Also, all the songs in the top 10 were happy and positive, as was the general ambience and theme of the Festival. Juanito's song, "Caballo De Palo," was the only song that was slow and sad. That made it an uphill climb for Juanito's song, and in the end, it was probably the biggest factor as to why he came in last place.

Regardless of these reasons, the people who viewed the festival, especially the Mexican "pueblo," felt that an injustice had occurred: Juanto Farias' performance was incredibly strong and for him to have come in last place was viewed as very unfair. This sentiment was instantly felt in the "Siempre En Domingo" studios, and around the country as soon as it became apparent that Juanito Farias didn't even place in the top 3. In an unplanned event, Raúl Velasco reacted by awarding Juanito Farias a "Mejor Interprete Del Festival" award, even though that "award" was not formally part of the Festival's rules and regulations. Because of this, Juanito became known as, "El Campeon Sin Corona," and the general consensus back then as well as today, is that Juanito Farias should have at least placed in the top 3, and possibly even 1st place.

There are other arguments about this, such as Raúl Velasco favored Lorenzo Antonio Y Su Grupo, and was more disparaging towards Juanito Farias due to the color of their skin (Lorenzo Antonio and his sisters being more “white” and Juanito Farias being more “brown”). This however, is an unfounded argument. At the time, Raúl Velasco’s opinion of Juantio was quite the opposite. After the finals, Juanito was one of the artists that was most heavily backed by “Siempre En Domingo” and Raúl Velasco.

Ultimately, all this controversy boosted the Festival’s popularity, as well as the popularity of all involved, even more.

=== More Details ===
- In Mexico and other Latin American countries, Juguemos a Cantar was the most important musical event of 1982.
- The commemorative album of this first Festival sold over 1 million copies. The album contained the 10 winning songs, plus 4 songs that just missed the top ten (Semifinalists), and the theme song, "Juguemos A Cantar," sung by, Lucerito.
- The 10 judges at the final were 4 children, and 6 radio programmers from the most popular radio stations in Mexico City.

The children judges were:

Jorgito Cordero (a participant in the festival that didn’t make it to the finals), Sandra Lopez, (a participant in the festival that didn’t make it to the finals), Ginny Hoffman, (an invited guest judge from the show, Chiquilladas), and Lucerito, who sang the theme song of the festival.

The radio programmer judges were:

Enrique Ortiz (Director Artistico XEOY, Radio Mil), Elias Cervantes (Director Artistico Radio Variedades), Eduardo Olinares (Director Artistico XECMQ, Radio Sensacion), Gutavo Paez (Director Artistico Radio Felicidad), Don Juan Calderon (Director Artistico XEX, Televisa Radio), and Javier Frias (Director Artistico Radio Centro).

- Other great artists were discovered in the Festival too, such as Patricia Manterola from the Grupo Plum-Kiss. Lucerito’s career also received a big boost due to her singing the theme song, as well as participating as a judge in the final.
- While this Festival was mainly a children's competition, other talent was discovered and propelled as well. For example, the theme song for the Festival, "Juguemos a Cantar," was written by the famous songwriter / producer / arranger, Sergio Andrade. In 1982, his song was submitted to the Festival Committee, along with many other songs by several other authors. The Festival Committee, and the record company, Discos Musart, unanimously selected the song written (music and lyrics) by Sergio Andrade. It became the official theme of the Festival, and it was performed by Lucerito. It was included on the first commemorative album of the Festival, it became immensely popular, and was highly acclaimed for the novel arrangements (also done by Andrade).
- The festival was not only hosted by Raúl Velasco, but also by Janet Arceo, and Graciela Mauri.
- The festival was sponsored by the snack maker, Barcel. “La Ardillita Barcel,” (Barcel, the squirrel), the company’s mascot, appeared on the show and was even on the trophy and medallion given to the winners.
- A futuristic, science fiction theme was chosen for the Festival that was heavily influenced by the movie, “Star Wars.” Many of the participants wore futuristic wardrobe, there were alien characters on the show, there was an “R2-D2” type robot called XFB14 that announced the total points given to the participants, and even the points were called, “electropuntos” (electric points).
- After the Festival, there was a Juguemos a Cantar tour. Most of the Juguemos a Cantar acts were involved and they performed in over 70 cities to sold out crowds throughout Mexico. The Juguemos a Cantar tour also visited a few select cities in the United States.
- This Festival spawned the idea for the much more ambitious, yet not as successful, international Festival, América, Esta Es Tu Canción.

== 2o Festival Juguemos A Cantar ==
Because of the tremendous success of the 1st Festival, it was an easy decision for those involved to do a 2nd. This 2o Festival Juguemos A Cantar, which was held in 1983, provided a platform to stardom to the likes of, Eduardo Capetillo, Alan, Kennya Kay of the group Colibri, Chuchito and Marichelo (Chiquilladas TV Show members), Priscila (know today as Priscila y sus Balas De Plata), and the group Chikis (known today as Sparx).

A spooky, halloween-ish theme was chosen for this 2nd Festival.

At this time, the children phenomenon had begun to slightly decline. This 2nd Festival was still very popular, but not as popular as the 1st.

There were also several fundamental changes that occurred with this 2nd Festival. The most significant was that it was opened up to include talent from other record companies, not just Musart Records. This changed the dynamics of the festival considerably. Where the 1st festival was more of a talent search, the 2nd became more similar to – but not exactly like – the Festival OTI, where the artists competing are already signed with a record company.

=== The Top 3 ===
Here are the standings for the 2nd Juguemos A Cantar competition:

Final Standings of the 2nd Festival Juguemos A Cantar
Place	Artist	Song	Songwriter	Arranger
1	Colibrí	Mágico	Ignacio Copani Francisco Curiel	Chucho Ferrer
2	Eduardo Capetillo Ity	Mi Grupo Toca Rock Los Payasos	Javier Santos Ma. Eugenia de Ecesarte	Peque Rossino --
3	Chikis (Sparx)	El Bailde De La Gallina	Lorenzo Antonio	Tiny Morris

== 3rd Festival Juguemos A Cantar ==
In 1984, a 3rd Festival was held. By this time, the novelty of the contest and of children entertainers had waned considerably. Regardless of this, it still provided a platform to stardom to some major acts like Thalía, Edith Márquez (Heidi), and Flavio César. Also the singers Cristian Castro, and Pilar Montenegro participated in the festival, but they did not make it to the finals. In 1995, the festival was revived under the same name, it was also hosted by Raul Velasco.

=== The Top 3 ===
Here are the standings for the 3rd Juguemos A Cantar competition:

Final Standings of the 3rd Festival Juguemos A Cantar
Place	Artist	Song	Songwriter	Arranger
1	Grupo Universo	Vecinos Igual Que Amigos	Víctor Martín	Chucho Ferrer
2	Thalía	Moderna Niña De Rock	Mireya López Sánchez	Peque Rossino
3	Heidi (Edith Márquez)	Las Carabelas	Marilú Acosta Gabriela Martínez	Peque Rossino

== Track listing ==
=== 1st Festival ===
The album from the first Festival is composed of 15 songs. All of them were directed and produced by different songwriters. This first festival discovered great artists like Lucero, Lolita Cortes, Lorenzo Antonio and Patricia Manterola in the Grupo Plum-Kiss, singers who are still in force.

No.	Title	Writer(s)	Performer	Length
1.	"Tema "Juguemos a Cantar""	Sergio Andrade	Lucerito	2:20
2.	"El Combate"	Ma. Eugenia De Esesarte	Grupo Ábaco	2:54
3.	"Don Quijote y Sancho Panza"	Martha Heredia	Lolita Cortés	2:42
4.	"Rock and Roll"	Francisco Curiel	Ivette Y Monique	3:09
5.	"Fiesta en mi Pueblo"	Sergio Andrade	Las Vicuñitas	2:19
6.	"La Risa de las Vocales"	Tirzo Paiz	Katy	2:31
7.	"Como Gaviota"	Rosalía Sánchez A.	Sandra López	3:43
8.	"Pepito"	J. López Lee	Grupo Plum-Kiss	2:45
9.	"Vamos a Jugar"	Lorenzo Antonio	Lorenzo Antonio Y Su Grupo	2:52
10.	"Igual que el Universo"	Rosalía Sánchez A.	Byanka and Maleza	2:58
11.	"Si yo fuera Presidente"	Ignacio Copani, Pedro Krishmar	Sara Eugenia	2:58
12.	"Caballo de Palo"	Omar Alfano	Juanito Farias	4:04
13.	"Vamos a Mi Fiesta"	José A. Garay	Grupo Aventura	2:13
14.	"Circo"	Amador Sánchez	Grupo Tutti-Frutti	2:28
15.	"La Ordeña"	Benjamín Herrera, Gustavo A. Santiago	Jorgito Cordero	2:08

=== 2nd Festival ===
Juguemos a Cantar

Compilation album by Various Artists
- Released: 1983
- Recorded: 1983
- Genre: Pop, Children
- Label: Musart Records

Various Artists chronology
Juguemos a Cantar (1983)	Juguemos a Cantar (1984)

The 2nd Festival provided a platform to stardom for the likes of, Eduardo Capetillo, Alan, Kennya Kay of the group Colibri, Chuchito and Marichelo (Chiquilladas TV Show members), Priscila, and the group Chikis (known today as Sparx).

No.	Title	Writer(s)	Performer	Length
1.	"¿Dónde Están Los Niños?"	Juan Carlos Abara, Francisco Curiel	Juan Carlos Abara, Lorenzo Antonio, Grupo Ábaco, Juanito Farías, Ivette Y Monique	3:05
2.	"Amor Espacial"	M.A. Sánchez, Sergio Prid	Meteoro	3:07
3.	"Con Mi Guitarra"	Rosanna Defosse, Francisco Curiel	Fresa	2:58
4.	"Las Tobilleras Para Calentar"	Santiago Yturria	Juan Ramón	3:38
5.	"El Baile De La Gallina"	Lorenzo Antonio	Chikis	2:56
6.	"Soy Dinamita"	Villaseñor, Gómez, Puente, Tapia	Marychelo	2:27
7.	"La Amistad Es Un País Color Caramelo"	Horacio Lanzi, Anibal Pastor	Mía Y Matías	2:52
8.	"Los Payasos"	Ma. Eugenia De Esesarte	Ity	2:35
9.	"Cantando Y Bailando"	Janet Walls	Confeti	3:05
10.	"Ma Ma Ma"	Carlos Vargas	Mayra Silva	3:27
11.	"Ha Salido El Sol"	Javier Santos	Erick (Alan)	2:54
12.	"Mágico"	Ignacio Copani, Francisco Curiel	Colibrí	3:02
13.	"Mi Grupo Toca Rock"	Javier Santos	Eduardo Capetillo	2:45
14.	"¿Por Qué?"	Ignacio Copani	Sara Eugenia	3:05
15.	"Jaque Mate"	Benjamín Herrera, Carlos Vargas	Chuchito	2:33
16.	"Mi Burrito Querendón"	Tirzo Paiz	Priscila	2:36

=== 3rd Festival ===
Juguemos a Cantar

Compilation album by Various Artists
- Released: 1984
- Recorded: 1984
- Genre: Pop, Children
- Label: Musart Records

Various Artists chronology
Juguemos a Cantar (1983)	Juguemos a Cantar (1984)

In this 3rd and final Festival, several new artist emerged like Thalía, Edith Márquez (Heidi) and Flavio César. Also the singer Cristian Castro participated in the Festival, but he did not make to the finals.

No.	Title	Writer(s)	Performer	Length
1.	"Tema "Juguemos a Cantar""	Sergio Andrade	Ivette Y Monique	2:12
2.	"La Computadora"	Jorge Carlos Castro	Oro Sólido	3:05
3.	"Ríe"	Rosa María Martín del Campo	Jannette	2:34
4.	"Cuando Sea Grande"	Pedro A. Cárdenas	Flavio	3:23
5.	"Los Globos"	Ana E. Reyes	Grupo Globo	2:01
6.	"Perico"	Rossana Defosse, C. Chávez	Trinitón	2:40
7.	"Tú Con Ganas, Yo Con Fe"	J.T. Martínez, F. Armida	Rosángel	2:33
8.	"Vecinos Igual Que Amigos"	Víctor Martín	Grupo Universo	2:51
9.	"Vamos Ya"	Ma. Eugenia de Esesarte, Ana E. Reyes	Ernesto	2:52
10.	"Mi Gato"	Rosario Páramo	Grupo Tinnes	2:13
11.	"Letras En Un Corazón"	Víctor Alberti	Juan Luis	2:47
12.	"Las Carabelas"	Marilú Acosta, Gabriela Martínez	Heidi	2:32
13.	"Tropichavos"	Elvia E. Vázquez	Tropichavos	2:54
14.	"Moderna Niña De Rock"	Mireya López Sánchez	Thalía	2:50
15.	"No Quiten El Disco"	Ma. Eugenia de Esesarte	Grupo Rockola	3:16
16.	"Niña Punk"	Elvia E. Vázquez, Nallely Martínez	Ariatna	2:05
