= Enzo Malepasso =

Italian singer-songwriter

- Born: 31 May 1954; Naples, Italy
- Died: 27 April 2009 (aged 54); Siziano, Pavia, Italy
- Occupation: Singer

Vincenzo Malepasso (31 May 1954 – 27 April 2009), best known as Enzo Malepasso, was an Italian composer, singer and record producer.

== Life and career ==
Born in Naples, Malepasso graduated in counterpoint and composition at the Liceo Musicale in his hometown.

In the 1970s he started his activity as a composer, notably collaborating with Peppino di Capri, Fred Bongusto, Loretta Goggi and Peppino Gagliardi.

He also had a brief career as a singer, getting his major success in 1980 with the song "Ti voglio bene", which ranked second at the 30th Sanremo Music Festival and 26th at the Italian hit parade.

Following his exclusion from the finals of the 31st Sanremo Music Festival, in the following years Malepasso refocused his career on composing, and in particular he contributed to the launch of Fiordaliso both as songwriter and as producer.

In 1986, Malepasso began production of an album for Mexican pop star, Lorenzo Antonio. That album was released in 1987 and from it came several hits, including the immensely popular ballad, "Doce Rosas," co-written by Malepasso. "Doce Rosas" became one of the most popular songs in all of Latin America for the year 1987, peaking at #3 on the Latin Billboard charts that year, and it is considered to be one of the most successful Latin ballads of the '80's.

== Discography ==
Singles

- 1979 - "Mannaggia" (Polydor, 2060188)
- 1980 - "Ti voglio bene" (Polydor, 2060218)
- 1980 - "Resto con te" (Polydor, 2060232)
- 1981 - "Amore mio" (Polydor, 2060240)
- 1982 - "Canzoni nuove" (Aleph, AH-28003)
- 1984 - "È bello dire anche ti amo" (Durium, Ld Al 8190) (with Fiordaliso)

Album

- 1979 - Agrodolce (Polydor, 2448 090)
- 1980 - Ti voglio bene (Polydor, 2448 108)
