= Lorenzo Antonio =

American singer-songwriter (born 1969)

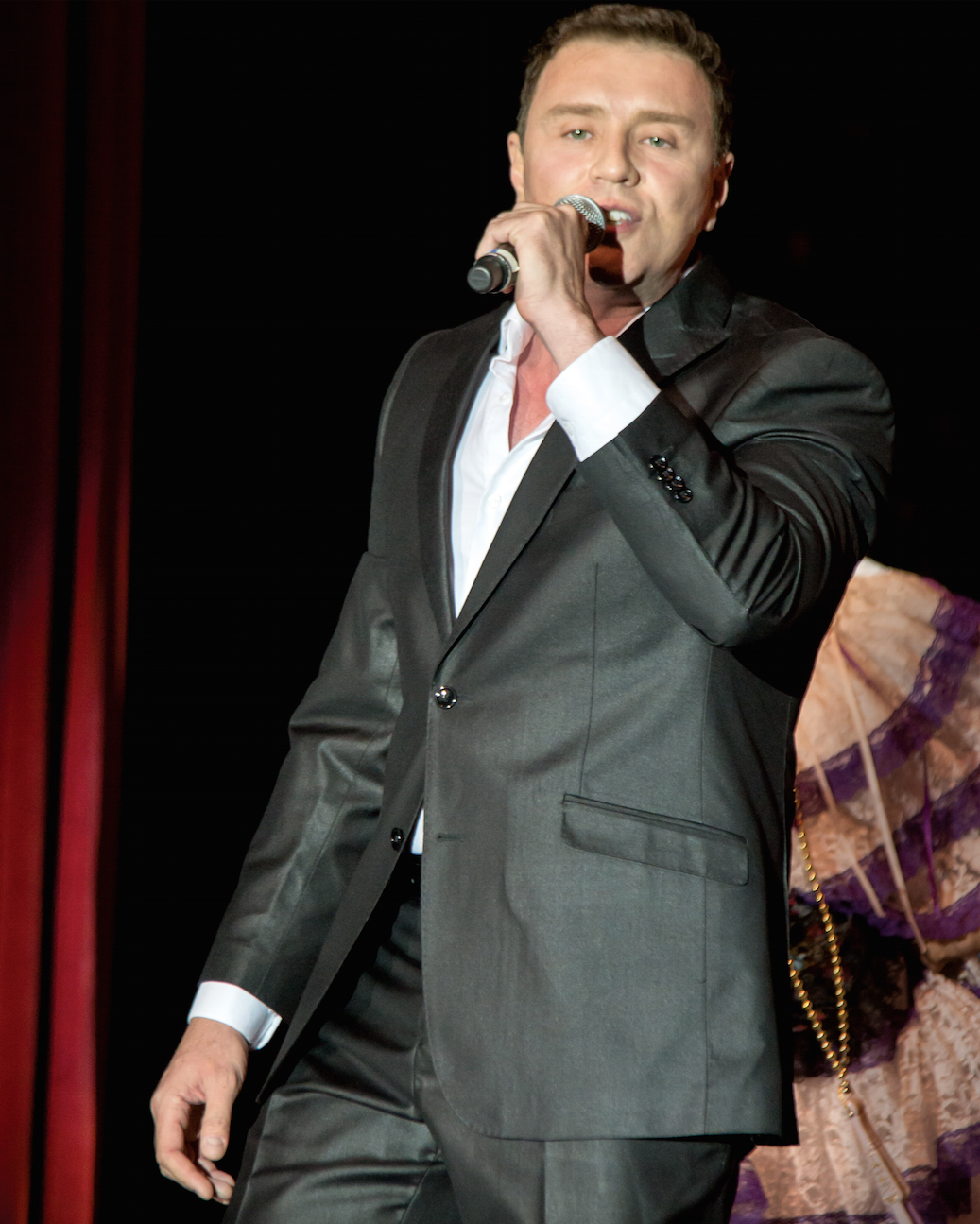
- Lorenzo Antonio performing in 2016.

Background information
- Born: Lorenzo Antonio Sánchez Pohl; October 3, 1969 (age 57); Albuquerque
- Origin: Albuquerque, New Mexico, United States
- Genres: Latin pop, Mariachi, Mexican pop, New Mexico music
- Occupations: Singer, songwriter, musician
- Instruments: Vocals, guitar, fiddle, banjo, cello, piano
- Years active: 1982–present
- Labels: Discos Musart, Warner Music Group, Fonovisa Records, Striking Music
- Website: lorenzoantonio.com

Lorenzo Antonio Sánchez Pohl (born October 3, 1969) is an American singer-songwriter known for his work in Latin music. He grew up in Mexico and the United States. Although bilingual in Spanish and English, he primarily records and performs in Spanish.

== Biography ==
=== Early life ===
Antonio was introduced to music at the age of 5. His father, Amador Sánchez (also known as Tiny Morrie), taught him to sing "La Bamba," while accompanying him on the guitar. Antonio's parents decided to enroll him in private classical guitar lessons, which he continued throughout his adolescent years.

=== Career ===
Antonio's career began in June 1982, when 12-year-old Antonio and his four sisters, Verónica, Rosamaria, Kristyna, and Carolina won first place in the Latin American talent festival "1er Festival Juguemos A Cantar." The Festival was held in Mexico City and broadcast by Televisa on the television show "Siempre en Domingo." They appeared in the competition as "Lorenzo Antonio y Su Grupo" (Lorenzo Antonio and His Group), and performed Antonio's composition entitled "Vamos a Jugar" ("Let's Play").

As a prize for winning the competition, Antonio was awarded three appearances on "Siempre en Domingo" and a record contract with Discos Musart. Near the end of 1982, he gained recognition for playing the violin, the uniforms that he and his sisters wore (sailor caps and bell-bottom pants), and the choreography that he and his four sisters performed to his song, "Vamos a Jugar," based on a dance similar to the Hokey Pokey, "La mano izquierda va adelante y la derecha para atrás" (the left hand goes to the front and the right hand goes to the back).

When Antonio entered his teen years, he pursued a solo career, separating from his sisters' group. This controversial decision initially disappointed many fans due to the group's established popularity, but ultimately proved successful for both Antonio's solo career and his sisters' later formation of the internationally known group Sparx.

During the 1980s and 1990s, Antonio toured Mexico, Central America, South America and the United States. Most of his most successful international songs were released during this period, including: "Vamos a Jugar", "Muchachita", "Como Me Gustas", "Busco Un Amor", "Dile", "No Lloraré", "Buscaré" (peaked at No. 7 on Billboard's Top Latin Song chart, May 14, 1988), "Él No Te Quiere" (peaked at No. 9 on Billboard's Top Latin Song chart, April 12, 1997), "No Quieren Que Te Quiera" (peaked at No. 16 on Billboard's Top Latin Song chart, August 16, 1997), and "Como Cuando Y Porque" (peaked at No. 12 on Billboard's Top Latin Song chart, July 16, 1994), which was an original song written and given to him by Mexican singer-songwriter Juan Gabriel. In 1987, Antonio achieved what many considered to be his greatest hit, and one of the most successful Latin ballads of the 1980s, "Doce Rosas." On May 23, 1987, Doce Rosas reached No. 3 on Billboard Magazine's Top Latin Song chart.

In the early 1990s, after a 2-year college stint at the University of New Mexico, Lorenzo Antonio signed with a new record company, Warner Music Group. During this period, he met Juan Gabriel, whose influence inspired him to release two tribute albums: "Mi Tributo A Juan Gabriel" ("My Tribute to Juan Gabriel") and Tributo 2 ("Tribute 2").

In the mid-1990s, Antonio focused his attention on his sisters, then members of the band Sparx. He wrote some songs for them as they were starting to gain notoriety in the Latin market in the United States.

In the late 1990s, Antonio signed a record deal with Fonovisa Records. The albums that he released during this period were mostly geared to the Regional Mexican market.

==== Songwriter ====
Antonio wrote many of his own hit records; ("Vamos A Jugar", "Como Me Gustas", "Lagrimas De Juventud", "Busco Un Amor", "No Quieren Que Te Quiera", and others). Some of his best-known songs recorded by other artists include: "El Baile De La Gallina," performed by Tatiana; and "Te Amo Te Amo Te Amo", "Los Hijos De Pantaleon", "El De Los Ojos Negros," plus "Si Ya No Hay Amor," all performed by his sisters' band, Sparx.

==== Other styles ====
While Antonio is most known internationally for interpreting romantic ballads, he has also been known for interpreting New Mexico music and Mariachi music.

Antonio has also released several albums in the Ranchera genre that feature him as a guitarist. One of the songs on his Ranchera albums, "Ranchera Jam," featured a mashup of him performing New Mexico style version of Mexican staples like "Cielito Lindo" and Tito Guízar's "Allá en el Rancho Grande," and Country music classics Johnny Cash's "Folsom Prison Blues" and Hank Williams' "Jambalaya (On the Bayou)".

Antonio participated with his sisters' band, Sparx, on the certified platinum albums, "Cantan Corridos" (peaked at No. 5 on Billboard's Top Regional Mexican Albums chart on February 8, 1997), and "Cantan Corridos Vol. 2," which are two of the most successful albums of his career.

==== Duets and other collaborations ====
In 1987, Antonio sang a duet with Italian singer Fiordaliso, "El Idioma Del Amor," also known in English as "We've Got Tonight."

In 1988, Antonio collaborated with Joan Sebastian, Lisa Lopez, Los Joao, and Byanka on the song "El Amigo Es," written by Enzo Malepasso and Joan Sebastian.

In 2014, Antonio performed a duet with Ana Bárbara of the song "Caray", which was filmed live and released as a video.

In 2016, Antonio performed a duet with Yolanda del Río of the song "Se Me Olvidó Otra Vez," as a tribute to their friend, Juan Gabriel, just days after his death. This performance was filmed live and released as a video and as an audio single.

== Charity work ==
In 2001, Antonio and his four sisters, all members of the band Sparx, founded "The Sparx and Lorenzo Antonio Foundation" – a non-profit foundation, which focuses on providing scholarships and promoting higher education. Each year, Antonio and Sparx perform at least one concert to raise money for The Sparx and Lorenzo Scholarship, which is awarded annually. Since 2001, the foundation has given out approximately $1,000,000 in scholarships to students.

== Cultural impact ==
=== Mexico ===
Due to the fact that Lorenzo Antonio Y Su Grupo won first place, they were at the forefront of the explosion of young talent in Mexico at the time. Antonio's song, "Vamos A Jugar," is considered a classic children's song in Mexico and Latin America and has been covered by many artists, such as Tatiana and Thalía, as well as being used in TV commercials.

The song, "Doce Rosas", originally interpreted by Antonio, was one of the top ballads of the 1980s.

=== United States ===
The financial help that Antonio and his sisters have provided via their foundation to New Mexico students has had a substantial impact on the lives of many young adults. Many of the recipients of the Sparx & Lorenzo Antonio Scholarship have stated that they would never have been able to afford a higher education without the scholarship.

== Personal life ==
=== Family ===
Antonio and his sisters, Sparx, regularly perform together and collaborate on recordings and in musical business ventures.

Antonio's father, Amador Sánchez, known artistically as Tiny Morrie, was a singer and continues to be a songwriter and producer. Antonio also has two paternal uncles, Baby Gaby and Al Hurricane, both of whom are musicians. Antonio's paternal grandparents both played instruments and sang. Many of Antonio's paternal great-uncles were also musicians.

Antonio's mother, Maria De Lourdes Gloria Pohl, known artistically as Gloria Pohl, had success as a singer in the southwest United States. Antonio's maternal grandfather and several of his 12 maternal uncles were or are musicians.

== Awards ==
=== Songwriting ===
- 1982: Platinum Record for the song, "Vamos A Jugar."
- 1983: Platinum Record for the song, "Lagrimas De Juventud."
- 1983: Platinum Record for the song, "Muchachita."
- 1983: Platinum Record for the song "Busco Un Amor."
- BMI Award Winning Song for "Mandame Flores."
- BMI Award Winning Song for "No Quieren Que Te Quiera."
- BMI Award Winning Song for "Que Debo Hacer."
- BMI Award Winning Song for "Te Amo Te Amo Te Amo."
- BMI Award Winning Song for "Te Quiero Mucho."
- BMI Award Winning Song for "El De Los Ojos Negros."

=== Record sales ===
- 1982: Platinum Record for the album "1er Festival Juguemos A Cantar."
- 1982: Platinum Record for the song, "Vamos A Jugar."
- 1983: Platinum Record for the song, "Lagrimas De Juventud."
- 1983: Platinum Record for the song, "Muchachita."
- 1983: Platinum Record for the song "Busco Un Amor."
- 1987: Platinum Record for the album "Doce Rosas."
- 1994: Gold Record for the album "Mi Tributo A Juan Gabriel."
- 1997: Triple Platinum Record for the album "Cantan Corridos."
- 1999: Platinum Record for the album "Cantan Corridos Vol. 2."

=== Other awards ===
- 1982: 15 Grandes De Siempre en Domingo, for the song, "Como Me Gustas."
- 1984: 15 Grandes De Siempre en Domingo, for the song, "¡Ay! Amor."
- 1984: Premio Amprofon De Oro
- 1987: 15 Grandes De Siempre en Domingo, for the song, "Doce Rosas."
- 1988: Premio AMPRyT – Mejor Interprete Juvenil 1988
- 1987: Aplauso 92 – Cantante Juvenil Revelación Del Año 1987

== Discography ==
=== Official albums ===
- 1982: Lorenzo Antonio – (Discos Musart)
- 1983: Lorenzo Antonio (Busco Un Amor) – (Discos Musart)
- 1984: Lorenzo Antonio (¡Ay! Amor) – (Discos Musart)
- 1985: Lorenzo Antonio (Inexperta Y Sensual) – (Discos Musart)
- 1986: Lorenzo Antonio (Por Orgullo) – (Discos Musart)
- 1986: Lorenzo Antonio (Doce Rosas) – (Discos Musart)
- 1987: El Amigo Es – (Discos Musart)
- 1989: Lorenzo Antonio (Amores Míos) – (Discos Musart)
- 1990: Estas En Mis Dominios – (Discos Musart)
- 1992: Mi Tributo A Juan Gabriel – (Warner Music Group)
- 1995: Tributo 2 – (Warner Music Group)
- 1996: Sparx Y Lorenzo Antonio Cantan Corridos – (Fonovisa)
- 1997: El No Te Quiere – (Fonovisa)
- 1998: Lorenzo Antonio (Siempre Te Amare) – (Fonovisa)
- 1998: Sparx Y Lorenzo Antonio Corridos Vol. 2 – (Fonovisa)
- 1999: Pura Miel (1st Edition) – (Fonovisa)
- 2001: Sparx Y Lorenzo Antonio Para Las Madrecitas – (Fonovisa)
- 2003: Lorenzo Antonio Y Sparx Grandes Exitos Con Mariachi – (Striking Music)
- 2003: Lorenzo Antonio Y Sparx ¡A Bailar! – (Striking Music)
- 2005: Canta Rancheras Y Mas... – (Striking Music)
- 2006: Rancheras Vol. 2 – (Striking Music)
- 2007: Lorenzo Antonio Y Sparx Corridos Famosos – (Striking Music)
- 2007: Lorenzo Antonio Y Sparx ¡Fiesta! – (Striking Music)
- 2008: Ranch3ras – (Striking Music)
- 2008: Amores – (Striking Music)
- 2010: Pura Miel (2nd Edition) – (Striking Music)
- 2011: Quedate Conmigo – (Striking Music)
- 2013: ¡En Vivo! – (Striking Music)
- 2014: Sparx Y Lorenzo Antonio Corridos Famosos Vol. 2 – (Striking Music)
- 2015: Exitos Rancheros – (Striking Music)
- 2016: Con Mariachi – (Striking Music)
- 2017: Ayer Y Hoy – (Striking Music)
- 2023: Cumbias Con Mariachi – (Striking Music)
