= El Zorro =

El Zorro may refer to:

- Zorro, a fictional character
- El Zorro (wrestler) (Jesús Cristóbal Martínez Rodriguez, born 1975), Mexican professional wrestler
- El Zorro (railway), Australian railway operator

== See also ==
- Zorro (disambiguation)
- Zorro (name)
