= Zorro (name) =

Zorro is a given name and surname. Zorro is Spanish for 'fox'. Zorro is the name of a fictional character created in 1919 by Johnston McCulley, typically portrayed as a dashing masked vigilante. Notable people with the name include:

== Surname ==
- João Zorro, 13th-century Portuguese troubadour
- Gonzalo García Zorro, 16th-century Spanish conquistador

== Given name ==
- Zorro David (1923–2008), Filipino actor
- Zorro Aguilar (1942–1984), Filipino human rights lawyer

== Nickname ==
- Zoilo Versalles (1939–1995), Cuban Major League Baseball player nicknamed "Zorro"
- Fernando Villares (1955–2017), Mexican singer and politician known as "Zorro"

== See also ==
- Zorro (disambiguation)
