= Reflections in a Golden Eye (novel) =

1941 novel by Carson McCullers

- First edition cover with paper and cellophane dust jacket
- Author: Carson McCullers
- Language: English
- Genre: Southern Gothic; Gay novel
- Publisher: Houghton Mifflin
- Publication date: 1941
- Publication place: United States
- Media type: Print (Hardback)
- Pages: 182 pp
- OCLC: 44518055
- Dewey Decimal: 813/.52 21
- LC Class: PS3525.A1772 R4 2000

Reflections in a Golden Eye is a 1941 novel by American author Carson McCullers.

It first appeared in Harper's Bazaar in 1940, serialized in the October–November issues. The book was published by Houghton Mifflin on February 14, 1941, to mostly poor reviews. The book was dedicated to the Swiss journalist, travel writer and novelist Annemarie Schwarzenbach (1908–1942), whom McCullers had met and befriended in the summer of 1940 (after the book was finished).

It was adapted as a 1967 film of the same name, featuring Elizabeth Taylor and Marlon Brando.

== Conception ==
McCullers wrote the book in 1939, originally using the title "Army Post". She said the story had germinated when, as an adolescent, she had first stepped into the alien territory of Fort Benning in Georgia. A more direct inspiration came from a chance remark which her husband Reeves (an ex-soldier) made to her about a voyeur who had been arrested at Fort Bragg; a young soldier had been caught peeping inside the married officers' quarters.

McCullers wrote the novel while in Fayetteville, North Carolina, near Fort Bragg. After two months of arduous writing, she finished her manuscript and put it away in a dresser. She later said of it:

I am so immersed in my characters that their motives are my own. When I write about a thief, I become one; when I write about Captain Penderton, I become a homosexual man. I become the characters I write about and I bless the Latin poet Terence who said 'Nothing human is alien to me.'

== Premise ==
The novel takes place at an army base in the U.S. state of Georgia. Private Ellgee Williams, a solitary man full of secrets and desires, has served for two years and is assigned to stable duty. After doing yard work at the home of Capt. Penderton, he sees the captain's wife nude and becomes obsessed with her.

Capt. Weldon Penderton and his wife Leonora, who grew up as an Army brat, have a fiery relationship, and she takes many lovers. Leonora's current lover, Major Morris Langdon, lives with his depressed wife Alison and her flamboyant houseboy Anacleto, near the Pendertons.

Capt. Penderton, as a closeted homosexual, realizes that he is physically attracted to Pvt. Williams, but remains unaware of the private's attraction to Leonora.

== Reception and critical analysis ==
After its publication in 1941, the novel caused some consternation in Columbus, Georgia and at Fort Benning, where people speculated about the source of McCullers' tale.

According to author Michael Bronski, McCullers tackled the topics of "homosexuality, sadism, voyeurism, and fetishism while exploring the boundaries of eroticism, outsider status and the fragility of normal in the novel."

Anthony Slide, another 21st-century scholar, considers Reflections in a Golden Eye to be one of only four well-known gay novels in the English language in the first half of the 20th century. The other three are Djuna Barnes's Nightwood, Truman Capote's Other Voices, Other Rooms, and Gore Vidal's The City and the Pillar.

== Adaptation ==
A 1967 film adaptation of Reflections in a Golden Eye was directed by John Huston. It stars Marlon Brando, Elizabeth Taylor, Julie Harris, Brian Keith and Robert Forster.
