= Sparx (American band) =

American Latin band

- Origin: New Mexico, U.S.
- Genres: Latin music, New Mexico music, Regional Mexican
- Years active: 1980s–present
- Labels: Fonovisa Records; Striking Music
- Members: Kristyna Sanchez; Rosamaria Sanchez; Verónica Sanchez; Carolina Sanchez
- Website: gruposparx.com

Sparx is an American New Mexico music band composed of the four Sanchez sisters Verónica, Rosamaria, Kristyna and Carolina. They were known beginning with their childhood career, in the 1980s. In the 1990s they found fame in Mexico and most Latin American countries in addition to success in the United States, recording a variety of styles of songs including pop songs, as well as Latin music classics, corridos, cumbias, ballads, and boleros.

They had their beginning taking part in a songwriting competition at the festival Juguemos a Cantar with the winning song "Vamos a Jugar". They appeared as "Lorenzo Antonio y Su Grupo" (Lorenzo Antonio and His Group). They've collaborated with their brother Lorenzo often, including with albums like Corridos Famosos, Latin folk songs like a take on Juan Gabriel's and Rocío Dúrcal's "Que Bonito es Santa Fé" and even country duets like "The Wild Side of Life/It Wasn't God Who Made Honky Tonk Angels".

The sisters came from a musical family. Their father Amador Sanchez was a musician, songwriter, and record producer known as Tiny Morrie who had a huge hit "Cartas Tristes". Their mother, Gloria Pohl, was a vocalist who has recorded two albums. Their brother Lorenzo Antonio is also a renowned singing artist in his own right. Their uncles Al Hurricane dubbed Godfather of New Mexico music and Baby Gaby, as well as Al's son Al Hurricane Jr.

Many of their songs have hit the top 10 on Billboards Latin charts. The band has also been nominated for Billboard awards and the Lo Nuestro Award for Pop Group or Duo of the Year at the 7th Lo Nuestro Awards.

Sparx members and their brother Lorenzo Antonio are very much involved in charity through Sparx Lorenzo Antonio Foundation. Since 2001, date of its establishment, the foundation distributes college scholarships for New Mexico high school students.

== Discography ==
- 1991: “Lágrimas de Juventud"
- 1993: “Un Tonto Mas"
- 1994: Con Mariarchi
- 1994: Te Amo, Te Amo, Te Amo
- 1995: Hay un Tonto Más
- 1995: Mándame Flores
- 1996: Cantan Corridos
- 1997: Tiene Que Ser Amor
- 1999: Navidad
- 1999: Cantan Corridos, Vol. 2
- 2000: No Hay Otro Amor
- 2001: 15 Kilates Musicales
- 2001: Con Mariachi, Vol. 2
- 2001: Para las Madrecitas
- 2003: Lo Dice Mi Corazón
- 2004: Caminos del Amor
- 2005: Con Mucho Amor
- 2015: Juntas Otra Vez

Joint albums (Lorenzo Antonio and Sparx)

- 1996: Sparx y Lorenzo Antonio Cantan Corridos
- 1998: Sparx y Lorenzo Antonio Cantan Corridos Vol. 2
- 2007: Lorenzo Antonio y Sparx Corridos Famosos Con Mariarchi
- Lorenzo Antonio y Sparx Grandes Exitos Con Mariachi
- Para Las Madrecitas
- ¡Fiesta!
- ¡A Bailar!

== Singles ==
Year	Single	Peak chart positions			
Year	Single	U.S. Latin	U.S. Latin Pop	U.S. Regional Mexican	U.S. Tropical
1994	"Te Amo, Te Amo, Te Amo"	3	—	2	—
1995	"Quiero Que Me Vuelvas A Querer"	10	—	—	—
1995	"Que Debo Hacer"	10	—	7	—
1995	"Quiero Volver El Tiempo Atras"	17	—	10	—
1996	"Mandame Flores (Ay, Ay, Ay)"	17	—	13	—
1996	"El Corrido De Juanito"	20	—	13	—
1996	"Bajo La Luna"	37	—	—	—
2000	"No Hay Otro Amor"	—	20	—	22
