= Reflections in a Golden Eye (film) =

1967 film by John Huston

- Theatrical release poster
- Directed by: John Huston
- Screenplay by: Chapman Mortimer; Gladys Hill
- Based on: Reflections in a Golden Eye by Carson McCullers
- Produced by: Ray Stark
- Starring: Elizabeth Taylor; Marlon Brando; Brian Keith; Julie Harris; Robert Forster; Zorro David
- Cinematography: Aldo Tonti
- Edited by: Russell Lloyd
- Music by: Toshiro Mayuzumi
- Production company: Warner Bros.-Seven Arts
- Distributed by: Warner Bros./Seven Arts
- Release date: October 13, 1967
- Running time: 108 minutes
- Country: United States
- Language: English
- Box office: $1.5 million (US and Canada rentals)

Reflections in a Golden Eye is a 1967 American Southern Gothic psychological drama film, directed by John Huston and based on the 1941 novel of the same name by Carson McCullers. The film stars Elizabeth Taylor and Marlon Brando as unhappily married couple Leonora and Weldon Pendleton on a US Army base in Georgia during the 1940s. Brian Keith, Julie Harris, Robert Forster, and Zorro David were featured in major supporting roles. The film deals with elements of repressed sexuality—both homosexual and heterosexual—as well as mental illness, voyeurism, and murder.

Reflections in a Golden Eye was released by Warner Bros.-Seven Arts on October 13, 1967. The film received mixed reviews, with much publicity going toward the film's aggressively mature themes and content for the era. The film is often cited as an example of the weakening of the Hays Code due to its approval.

== Plot ==
Set at a U.S. Army post in the South in the late 1940s, the film tells of six central characters: Major Weldon Penderton and his wife, Leonora; Lieutenant Colonel Morris Langdon and his wife Alison; the Langdons' flamboyant houseboy Anacleto; and Private L. G. (Ellgee) Williams. The film captures their failures, obsessions, and their suppressed desires.

Former army brat Leonora is devoted to her horse, Firebird, and her role as a wife. However, she cares little for her husband Weldon, a repressed gay man prone to rage and tantrums. Leonora is secretly conducting an affair with their neighbor, Lt. Colonel Langdon. Alison Langdon mutilated herself after the death of their baby three years prior; she has since been depressed and withdrawn. Her only bonds now are with her effeminate Filipino houseboy Anacleto, and Capt. Murray Weincheck, a cultured and sensitive soldier. Pvt. Williams is introduced as being gentle and sympathetic to all of the horses in the stable.

One day, Major Penderton assigns Williams to clear some foliage at his private officer's quarters instead of his usual duty of maintaining the horses and stables. Upon meeting Leonora, Williams becomes enamored with her. That night, while the Pendertons and Langdons have a card game, Williams spies on them. He witnesses an argument between Leonora and Penderton, in which Leonora taunts Penderton and strips naked in front of him. From then on, Williams begins to spy on the couple. He eventually breaks into the house and watches Leonora sleep at night, unbeknownst to Penderton (they have separate bedrooms). As he continues this practice, Williams starts to go through Leonora's belongings, especially her lingerie and perfume. Alison witnesses Williams leaving the room one night, and questions Leonora about it, but she dismisses it as her imagination.

One day while riding, Langdon, Leonora and Penderton see Williams riding nude and bareback on one of the military horses. Penderton is critical of this to Leonora but his secret interest in the free-spirited Williams is clear. Meanwhile, Leonora tries to harass Alison into attending her party, and manipulates her into providing Anacleto to serve at the party. Aware of her husband's affair and fed up with it, Alison tells Anacleto her plans to divorce him.

On the night of Leonora's party, Penderton takes Firebird and rides wildly into the woods, passing the naked Williams at high speed. Penderton falls off, catching his foot in the stirrup, and is dragged for a distance. In a fit of uncontrollable rage, he viciously beats the horse and begins to sob. Williams appears, still naked, and takes the horse. As Penderton stands mute in the woods, Williams brings the horse back to the stable to tend its wounds.

Instead of attending the party, Alison stays home with her friend, Capt. Murray Weincheck. She is distraught to hear that Weincheck is being harassed out of the army by his superiors. Penderton returns to the house during the party, where Leonora discovers what has happened from her maid Susie and Penderton. Upon discovering the extent of Firebird's injuries, Leonora interrupts her party and repeatedly strikes her husband in the face with her riding crop in front of the guests.

Following the party, Penderton becomes infatuated with Williams and starts to follow him around the camp. Alison sees Williams leaving Leonora's room again, and goes over to "expose" them. However, Williams leaves the room before she can, causing her to snap and declare her intent to leave Langdon. Langdon commits her to a sanatorium, telling Leonora and Penderton that Alison was going insane. Alison is angry with her husband, and dies of a heart attack soon after he leaves. Anacleto disappears soon after her death.

One night, Penderton looks out of his window and sees Williams outside the house. He thinks Williams is coming to see him, but watches the younger man enter his wife Leonora's room instead. Penderton turns on the light to find Williams kneeling beside the bed watching his wife sleep and shoots him dead. The film ends with the camera wildly veering back and forth among the dead body, the screaming Leonora, and Penderton. The opening line of the novel and the film is restated: "There is a fort in the South where a few years ago a murder was committed."

== Cast ==
- Elizabeth Taylor as Leonora Penderton
- Marlon Brando as Major Weldon Penderton
- Brian Keith as Lt. Colonel Morris Langdon
- Julie Harris as Alison Langdon
- Zorro David as Anacleto
- Robert Forster as Private L. G. Williams
- Gordon Mitchell as the stables sergeant
- Irvin Dugan as Captain Murray Weincheck
- Fay Sparks as Susie
- Ed Metzger as Private Frank Brian

Uncredited

- Harvey Keitel as soldier
- Friedrich von Ledebur as Lieutenant at Garden Party

== Production ==
The film adaptation of the novel Reflections in a Golden Eye by Carson McCullers was being developed by Seven Arts Productions in 1963. Elizabeth Taylor accepted the part of Leonora Penderton on the condition that Montgomery Clift would be cast as well. However, Clift died on July 23, 1966, of a heart attack before production began. The role of Weldon Penderton subsequently went to Marlon Brando after both Richard Burton and Lee Marvin turned it down. Some of the film was shot in New York City and on Long Island, where John Huston was permitted to use the former Mitchel Field, then in use by Nassau Community College. Many of the interiors and some of the exteriors were filmed in Italy. Reflections in a Golden Eye was the film debut for actor Robert Forster.

The film was originally released with all scenes tinted with a gold filter, with only certain shades of reds (such as a rose) or greens not appearing in or approaching tints or shades of gold. This effect is a reference to the houseboy Anacleto (Zorro David)'s drawing of a peacock in whose large, golden eye the world is a reflection. As this version puzzled audiences, it was withdrawn within one week of release and replaced with a version processed in normal Technicolor. Film critic Roger Ebert wrote:

Since the film was photographed in full color and the "fading" was done in post-production, most of the video versions have simply restored the color. That's not what Huston intended, and the thing to do is to use your color adjustment to fade the color to almost but not quite b&w. Does it work? That's for you to decide.

A 2020 two-disc Blu-ray release of the film by Warner Bros. Home Entertainment features both Huston's intended version of the film and the re-color-timed reissued version.

== Reception ==
The film received mixed reviews at the time of its release. Variety called it a "pretentious melodrama" but praised Brian Keith's "superb" performance as the "rationalizing and insensitive middle-class hypocrite." Time described it as a "gallery of grotesques," with the poetry of the novel missing from the film. Its critic wrote: "All that remains praiseworthy is the film's extraordinary photographic technique."

Roger Ebert observed that the film was released without the usual publicity, despite its stellar cast and director: "Was the movie so wretchedly bad that Warner Bros. decided to keep it a secret? Or could it be, perhaps, that it was too good?" Ebert praised the production but noted that some audience members reacted to the film's emotional moments with guffaws and nervous laughter. John Simon wrote: "Yet for all its fidelity to the original, John Huston's film, with a script by Chapman Mortimer and Gladys Hill, is pedestrian, crass, and uninvolving to the point of repellance."

The film received a score of 55% on Rotten Tomatoes from 22 reviews. Metacritic, which uses a weighted average, assigned the film a score of 67 out of 100, based on 10 critics, indicating "generally favorable" reviews.

The film opened at number one at the US box office. The author of the novel, Carson McCullers, died a fortnight before the premiere.

== Legacy ==
Still photographs of Brando in character as Major Penderton were used later by the producers of Apocalypse Now. These photos of a younger Brando were displayed in the service record of the character Colonel Walter E. Kurtz.

== See also ==
- List of American films of 1967
