= Zoro =

Zoro may refer to:

- Zoro (band), Japanese rock band
- Zoro (drummer), American rock, R&B, and hip-hop drummer
- Zoro (musician), Nigerian rapper, singer, and songwriter
- Zoró, an indigenous people in Brazil
- Zoro, an online store operated by Zoro Tools, Inc., a subsidiary of W. W. Grainger
- Marco Zoro, football player from Ivory Coast
- Roronoa Zoro, fictional character in One Piece
- Zo Reunification Organization, a non-governmental organisation.

== See also ==
- Zorro (disambiguation)
