= Zorro (disambiguation) =

Zorro is a fictional character.

Zorro may also refer to:

== Arts and entertainment ==
=== Film and television ===
- Zorro (1957 TV series), a Walt Disney series
- Zorro (1975 Italian film), starring Alain Delon
- Zorro (1975 Hindi film), starring Rekha
- Zorro (1990 TV series), starring Duncan Regehr
- Zorro: Generation Z, a 2006 animated TV series
- El Zorro, la espada y la rosa, a 2007 telenovela
- Zorro (Philippine TV series), 2009
- Zorro (Spanish TV series), 2024 series starring Miguel Bernardeau
- Zorro (French TV series), 2024 series starring Jean Dujardin

=== Music ===
- The Zorros, a 1980s Australian rock band
- Zorro (musical), 2008
- "Zorro" (song), by The Chordettes, 1958
- "Zorro", a song by The Bluetones from the 2002 album Science & Nature

=== Other uses in arts and entertainment ===
- Zorro (novel), a 2005 origin story novel by Isabel Allende
- Zorro (1985 video game)
- Zorro (1995 video game)
- Captain Zorro, fictional villain in 1987 film Mr. India

== Other uses ==
- Zorro (name), including a list of people with the name or nickname
- Code Name "Zorro": The Murder of Martin Luther King Jr., a 1977 non-fiction book by Dick Gregory and Mark Lane
- Michigan goal, or Zorro, an ice hockey goal scored by an attacker starting behind the opposing net
- Fox (Spanish: zorro)
  - South American fox (Lycalopex), commonly called zorro in Spanish

== See also ==
- El Zorro (disambiguation)
- Zoro (disambiguation)
- Zorra (disambiguation)
- Johnston McCulley bibliography#Zorro, a list of Zorro books
- Amiga Zorro II, computer expansion bus
- Amiga Zorro III, computer expansion bus
