= Chapman Mortimer =

Scottish novelist

Chapman Mortimer was the pen name of William Charles ("W. C.") Chapman Mortimer (15 May 1907 – 1988), a Scottish novelist. He won the James Tait Black Award for fiction in 1951 for his novel Father Goose. He also co-wrote the screenplay for the 1967 John Huston film Reflections in a Golden Eye.

== Works ==
- A Stranger on the Stair (novel) (1950)
- Father Goose (novel) (1951)
- Young Men Waiting (novel) (1952)
- Mediterraneo (novel) (1955)
- Here in Spain (travel) (1955)
- Madrigal (novel) (1960)
- Amparo (novel) (1971)
