= Billboard Hot Latin Hits =

Billboard Hot Latin Hits is a series of compilation albums released by Rhino Records in 1998, featuring hit Latin music recordings from the 1980s and 1990s.

== The 80s Vol. 1 ==
Billboard Hot Latin Hits: The 80s Vol. 1

Compilation album by Various artists
- Released: March 17, 1998
- Recorded: 1980s
- Genres: Latin pop, dance-pop
- Length: 37:57
- Label: Rhino

Professional ratings
Review scores
| Source | Rating |
|---|---|
| Allmusic | link |

1. "Tu Dama de Hierro" — Marisela 3:15
2. "Castígame" — Lucía Méndez 3:37
3. "Doce Rosas" — Lorenzo Antonio 3:52
4. "El Pecado" — Amanda Miguel 3:42
5. "Tu Carcel" — Los Bukis 3:35
6. "Ay Amor" — Ana Gabriel 3:23
7. "Lluvia" — Eddie Santiago 4:57
8. "No Hay Mal Que Por Bien No Venga" — José Feliciano 4:15
9. "Qué Te Pasa" — Yuri 3:03
10. "María" — Franco 4:16

== The 80s Vol. 2 ==
Billboard Hot Latin Hits: The 80s Vol. 2

Compilation album by Various artists
- Released: March 17, 1998
- Recorded: 1980s
- Genres: Latin pop, dance-pop
- Length: 41:23
- Label: Rhino

Professional ratings
Review scores
| Source | Rating |
|---|---|
| Allmusic | link |

1. "Ya No" — Marisela 4:31
2. "Uno Entre Mil" — Mijares 3:29
3. "Así Fué" — Isabel Pantoja 5:28
4. "Cuéntame" — Lucerito 3:34
5. "Cómo Fuí a Enamorarme de Tí" — Los Bukis 4:33
6. "El Hombre Que Yo Amo" — Myriam Hernández 3:36
7. "Lambada" — Kaoma 3:29
8. "Abre las Ventanas al Amor" — Roberto Carlos 4:18
9. "Quién Como Tú" — Ana Gabriel 3:33
10. "Ni Tu Ni Ella" — Alvaro Torres 4:52

== The 90s ==
Billboard Hot Latin Hits: The 90s

Compilation album by Various artists
- Released: March 17, 1998
- Recorded: 1990s
- Genres: Latin pop, dance-pop
- Length: 40:56
- Label: Rhino

Professional ratings
Review scores
| Source | Rating |
|---|---|
| Allmusic | link |

1. "Para Amarnos Más" — Mijares 3:30
2. "Todo, Todo, Todo" — Daniela Romo 4:23
3. "Bailar Pegados" — Sergio Dalma 4:36
4. "No Lastimes Más" — Pandora 3:04
5. "Nada Se Compara Contigo" — Alvaro Torres 4:47
6. "Si Ella Supiera" — Julian 4:13
7. "Como la Flor" — Selena and Los Dinos 3:05
8. "Veleta" — Lucero 4:20
9. "Nunca Voy a Olvidarte" — Cristian Castro 5:06
10. "El Amor No Se Puede Olvidar" — Pimpinela 4:52
