= Siempre en Domingo =

- Created by: Raúl Velasco
- Presented by: Raúl Velasco
- Country of origin: Mexico
- No. of seasons: 28
- No. of episodes: 1480

Production
- Running time: Approximately 3 hours

Original release
- Network: El Canal de las Estrellas
- Release: December 14, 1969 – April 19, 1998

Siempre en Domingo (translated Always on Sunday) was a Mexican variety show created and hosted by Raúl Velasco. The show aired on Televisa from December 14, 1969, until April 19, 1998, when Velasco retired.

Siempre en Domingo became one of the most important, influential and popular TV shows in Latin America. Velasco's popular trademark, "patada de la suerte" (lucky kick), sponsored many artists that every Sunday performed in his popular TV show. Many English-speaking artists also performed on the show.

== Notable artists ==
Artists who performed (many of which debuted) on the show include:

- Jose Luis Rodriguez El Puma
- Selena
- Luis Miguel
- Soda Stereo
- Mecano
- Lynda Thomas
- Thalía
- Paulina Rubio
- Miguel Bosé
- Caifanes
- Alejandra Ávalos
- María Conchita Alonso
- Julio Iglesias
- Locomia
- Chayanne
- Ricky Martin
- Pinn
- Ivonne Avilez
- José José
- Raphael
- Celia Cruz
- Timbiriche
- Juan Gabriel
- Maná
- Alejandra Guzmán
- Menudo
- Maldita Vecindad
- Onda Vaselina
- Fey
- Cristian Castro
- Laureano Brizuela
- Flans
- Emmanuel
- Alejandro Fernández
- Roberto Carlos
- Benny Ibarra
- Café Tacvba
- Kabah
- Moenia
- Eduardo Capetillo
- Erik Rubín
- Julieta Venegas
- Kairo
- Kenny y los Eléctricos
- Enrique Guzmán
- Sentidos Opuestos
- Gloria Trevi
- Secos & Molhados
- Mercurio
- Jeans
- Irán Castillo
- Byanka
- Jorge Muñiz
- Los Chamos
- Los Chicos
- Mocedades
- Ricchi e Poveri
- Miguel Ríos
- La Sonora Dinamita
- Marco Antonio Solís
- José María Napoleón
- Beatriz Adriana
- Angélica María
- Johnny Laboriel
- Lola Beltrán
- La Sonora Santanera
- César Costa
- Los Baby's
- Chico Che
- Joan Sebastián
- Verónica Castro
- Camilo Sesto
- Ana Gabriel
- Laura León
- Presuntos Implicados
- Amistades Peligrosas
- Fresas Con Crema
- Ricardo Montaner
- Lucía Méndez
- Vicente Fernández
- Manoella Torres
- Daniela Romo
- Lucero
- Manuel Mijares
- Pandora
- Daniela Mercury
- Pedro Fernández
- Tatiana
- Yuri
- Lorenzo Antonio
- El Tri
- Magneto
- Fandango
- Garibaldi
- Micro Chips
- Sasha Sokol
- Ritmo Peligroso
- Bronco
- Grupo Bryndis
- Los Ángeles Negros
- Pimpinela
- Amanda Miguel
- Diego Verdaguer
- Parchís
- Rocío Dúrcal
- Rocío Jurado
- Hombres G
- Charly García
- Alaska y Dinarama
- Enanitos Verdes
- Nacha Pop
- Franco De Vita
- Los Prisioneros
- Duncan Dhu
- Ricardo Arjona
- Mónica Naranjo
- Enrique Iglesias
- Shakira
- The Sacados
- Alejandro Sanz
- Marisela
- La Ley
- Laura Pausini
- Héroes Del Silencio
- Eros Ramazzotti
- Gloria Estefan
- H2O
- Fernando Villares
- Stephanie Salas

=== Notable non-Spanish-language acts ===
- Bee Gees
- ABBA
- Tina Turner
- David Lee Roth
- Whitney Houston
- Bryan Adams
- Sting
- Peter Cetera
- Richard Clayderman
- Richard Marx
- The Bangles
- Cyndi Lauper
- Olivia Newton-John
- Herb Alpert
- Barry Manilow
- Laura Branigan
- Gillette
- Village People
- Donna Summer
- Frankie Valli
- Shaun Cassidy
- Gloria Gaynor
- Sheena Easton
- Crowded House
- Boney M.
- KWS
- Spice Girls
- Sammy Davis Jr.
- Andy Gibb
- Jimmy Osmond
- Sabrina
- Level 42
- Jimmy Osmond
- The Outfield
- Linda Ronstadt
- Xuxa
- Mireille Mathieu
- Nana Mouskouri
- Princess Stéphanie of Monaco

== Cancellation ==
In 1998, Velasco was diagnosed with hepatitis C and needed a liver transplant. His health was becoming critical and was unable to continue hosting the show. Siempre en Domingo aired its last episode on April 19, 1998.
