= Fernando Villares =

Mexican singer and politician (1955–2017)

Fernando Villares Moreno (1955 – March 9, 2017), also known as Zorro ('Fox'), was a Mexican singer and politician. He was from Yucatan, Mexico, where he resided for a good portion of his life.

== Early life ==
He was the son of Fernando Villares Cámara (Fernando Villares Sr.) and of Carmen Gladys Moreno Chauvet, both of whom owned businesses and were involved in local politics.

== Career ==
Villares Moreno launched a singing career as a young man. He was known for his androgynous looks, with neck-length blond hair as well as clothing that included hair and many faux fox tails attached to it.

Villares Moreno was managed by Amparo Rubin (aunt of Timbiriche member Erik Rubin), who had him sing live on a Televisa show named Siempre en Domingo (Always on Sunday). Villares Moreno had released an LP album in 1981, named Fugitivo.

What was supposed to be a crowning achievement for Villares Moreno instead turned into an embarrassing moment, both for him and for the show's host Raul Velasco, and one that has been often mentioned among fans as one of the show's most memorable incidents, when Villares Moreno sang live on the show on January 17, 1982. Velasco greatly disliked Villares Moreno's looks and voice, and he made his dislike known to the public, interrupting Villares Moreno as he was in the midst of singing his song titled Fugitivo.

Velasco proceeded to let Villares Moreno know that he disapproved of Villares Moreno's voice and looks. Since Siempre en Domingo was seen across Latin America, this episode gave Villares Moreno a sort of infamy in the Spanish speaking world.

Televisa's owners, however, along with Rubin, were trying to push Zorros career forward and were very unhappy with Velasco after the incident. Velasco was therefore forced to bring Villares Moreno back into the show the next week and offer him a public apology.

Villares Moreno continued on with his singing career and he made several concerts. However, and due in part to the embarrassing incident, his career petered out and he did not record any further albums, deciding to retire from the show business world.

== Political career ==
Villares Moreno became involved in Quintana Roo politics and he held several political offices in the state and in the city of Cancun.

== Later fame ==
With the advent of video streaming services such as YouTube, videos, both featuring his Fugitivo album and his Siempre en Domingo showing, helped Villares Moreno find new fame later on. However, he refused to return to the world of entertainment and remained a relatively private person.

== Personal life ==
He was the brother of Rossana Villares, who was Miss Mexico in 1973.

Villares Moreno was openly homosexual.

The last years of his life, Villares Moreno lived in a Quintana Roo house that was left to him by his late grandmother.

== Death ==
Villares died of a stroke on March 9, 2017.

== See also ==
- List of Mexicans
- William Hung - another singer who became famous in a similar way
- Boy George
