= Zorra (disambiguation) =

Zorra is a township in Oxford County, Ontario, Canada.

Zorra may also refer to:

- "Zorra" (Bad Gyal song), 2021
- "Zorra" (Nebulossa song), 2024

== See also ==
- Zorra Total, a Brazilian television comedy show, often shortened to Zorra
- Zorro (disambiguation)
