= Fandango (Mexican band) =

Mexican girl group

Fandango was a Mexican pop girl group formed in Monterrey, Mexico in 1984 and disbanded in 1991. The group consisted of 5 teenage classmates and friends who recorded and released their debut album under EMI Music early the following year.

The pop-music revolution throughout Mexico in the late 1980s was a major inspiration for creating the band in order to compete against other teenager groups such as Menudo, Timbiriche, Flans, and Pandora.

Their first hit, "Autos, Moda y Rock 'n Roll", rose in the charts in 1987 and remained in the top 10 for over 8 weeks. Further exposure on the soundtrack to Grand Theft Auto V extended the reign of the song on the charts. In addition, the girls were setting teen fashion trends in Mexico and Central America.

== Early years ==
In 1984, a young Monterrey producer named Abelardo Leal had the idea to create a new group made up entirely of women to counteract a wave of "boy bands". He then started holding auditions to select the band members. After months of auditions, five teenage girls were chosen: fourteen-year-old Yadira, fifteen-year-old Rocío, fifteen-year-old Diana-Carolina, sixteen-year-old Moña and fifteen-year-old Evalinda.

Leal got them a contract with Zigan Records in Monterrey, where they cut their debut album Contrasts in 1985. The album was only released in and around their home city and among family and friends and garnered little attention at first.

Like many teen acts of the day, in order to support the album, the girls played local shopping malls, which garnered invitations to play private parties.

Diana-Carolina and Yadira left the group a few months after the release of the album. This cost them virtually all notoriety due to the fact that almost all biographical entries omit them from mention.

Several months later, an opportunity arose for the band to escape regional anonymity when EMI Capitol artistic director Luis Moyano visited Monterrey, expressed interest in the band, and signed them to a lucrative 5-album recording contract. He reissued their independent-label debut on an extremely low budget, but, once again, it failed to gain any traction.

== First success ==
Starting in 1987, their songs and dance steps were memorized by teenagers to be part of teen parties, the first large-scale event of which was the Miss Mexico beauty pageant in Querétaro. From there, a number of songs garnered a heavy rotation on national radio, namely The Return to My Heart in Eighty Seconds, Irresistible Seduction and A Million Ways to Forget You.

Their sophomore release, entitled Cars, Fashion and Rock & Roll, received a Gold Record Award. This, along with the girls' new status as role models for girls and young women, cemented their status as rising stars. This success led to further accolades when the weekly music program Always on Sunday, hosted by Raúl Velasco, awarded the band their top prize of its 15 Greatest Groups award.

== Popularity and changes in lineup ==
In 1988, their third album was released, entitled Hello! How Are You? (or Hello! What's Up?) containing several subsequent radio hits such as Rich and Famous, Too Young, and the title track. The B-side to the title track single Alta Tension is strongly reminiscent of late 1980s Madonna and producer Jellybean Benitez and enjoyed a bit of South Texas airplay.

The girls also recorded songs such as For You and Me and contributed a track entitled The Little Witch to an EMI children's' anthology album Once Upon a Time featuring many then-current EMI pop acts such as Pandora, Yuri, Manuel Mijares and Tatiana. During the promotion of Hello! How Are You? Alexa left the group to concentrate on her family. Years later she would join the group Timbiriche.

The promotion of the album continued with the 4 remaining members. Subsequently, auditions were held to find Alexa's replacement. Seventeen-year-old Sandra was selected and immediately began concerts and public appearances. Evalinda also left the group shortly thereafter to live a more normal life. After her departure, EMI once again held another round of auditions, confirming eighteen-year-old Janet as a replacement.

== Magical Dreams (fourth album) ==
The album Magical Dreams, which was released in 1989 to welcome the new members and introduce them to fans, contained several soon-to-be radio hits such as Two Hearts in the Dark and Everybody Wants to Dance with Me, the latter of which was adopted by teens of all creeds who grew up with the need to express themselves through dance. The album was also innovative in introducing a touch of art, as well as in bringing its Europop and Eurodance influences to Mexico. Over the summer the band made a special appearance on the TV show Single Dad.

== Lack of record label support ==
During the promotion of the album, the record label was increasingly losing interest in the group, culminating with its decision not to renew the group's contract due to lack of sales, which was completely untrue. Due to this, the five girls, as well as Abelardo, saw that EMI was not putting in the same effort as before and therefore saw the group as disbanded.

== Continuation without EMI ==
Ronald Correa, a local businessman, met Abelardo Leal and convinced the girls to continue on without the participation of the label. Without a record label, the group would need to start over and prove to the public once again what they were made of.

In order for them to be noticed anew, they would need to start over from scratch and perform outdoor concerts in the Southern California area, meaning that for several months, the group performed at every music festival in the area. Liliaa left to study abroad at the university and Moña remained Stateside, marrying the producer. Auditions were subsequently held for replacements, after which Anabella and Marlene were selected.

== International success and return to EMI ==
In December 1990, the band was unexpectedly included in an interview for TEEN magazine, something that no other Mexican artist had done previously. This again captured the attention of both their original label EMI and competitor Sony Music, both of which tendered offers towards the group, giving them a choice between the two music giants.

The main reason the group chose to rejoin EMI was to complete their original 5-album contract, even though the label had previously let them out of the requirement. As a result, the girls and Leal decided to give EMI first pick.

== Be Happy Again (fifth and final album) ==
This resulted in their 5th and final album Be Happy Again, released in early 1991, featuring, among others, compositions by the same writers Hernaldo Hays-Seeger-Zúñiga, Manuel Pacho, Emilio Gonzalez and producer Abelardo Leal that had contributed to their early success. Even though the group was trailblazing with new trends, EMI once again did not see the kinds of sales numbers they were expecting and therefore stopped promoting the album, costing further sales losses.

During the band's existence, there were many good and bad points regarding how the group's image was maintained. For example, the public was never allowed to have up close and personal contact with the members, so fans could not personally identify with them. Simple facts like birthdays or names of past members were withheld. The situation reached a tipping point and their popularity began to wane. However, even with this and other obstacles, the band continued to have some success.

== Efforts to avoid disbanding ==
Desperate to avoid disbanding, Correa was able to convince the Target department store to have Fandango as a spokesgroup for store openings near the US-Mexico border. However, only Janett and the original member Liliana (who had left the group the previous year in 1990) could be convinced to appear.

As Anabella, Marlene, Sandra and Rocio refused to be part of the promotion, they were subsequently dismissed or left of their own accord. Marlene completed her studies and is currently host of a children's program in her native Monterrey, where she calls herself "Lore-Lore", Anabella subsequently returned to Mexico City, Rocio married and raised a family, and Sandra lives a normal life out of the spotlight. Needing replacements and not being interested in going through auditions once again, Correa selected Jeannie, younger sister of Janett and two of her friends from school as replacements.

The new lineup recorded two commercials for Target that were shown through the holiday season of 1991. However, in early January 1992, Abelardo Leal decided that Fandango was to be no more and ended his alliance with Correa. Frustrated, and weary of continuing on even with another label and possibly receiving the same treatment, the girls and Leal decided to disband for good.

== Since then ==
=== 2000's ===
During mid-2000s, with the revolution of the 1980s back in fashion, including in music, EMI reissued 3 of the 5 discs in both CD and digital download and achieved high sales of both.

=== 2010s ===
In February 2011, twenty years after the group originally disbanded, four of the original members, Alexa, Evalinda, Liliana and Rocío, reunited for a tribute concert called Love Life to honor one of their early producers Loris Ceroni for his 25-year career with them and other acts. Held on February 9 in Guadalajara, Fandango performed a new version of their first hit: Cars, Fashion and Rock and Roll. The concert was a huge success and recorded for a yet-to-be-released album and DVD. Plans were afoot for a reunion tour but the tour was ultimately shelved for unknown reasons. The concert remained as the only special reunion up to that time.

Seven years later in March 2018, the nine official members (originals and replacements, with the exception of Diana Carolina, Yadira, and Karina, who were never introduced to the public as Official Members) met during a private dinner in Monterrey. When news broke of the event, it infuriated fans that the others were left out.

Finally, in June of that same year, Alexa, Rocío, Anabella, Sandra, Liliana and Lorena (Marlene) managed to reunite as Fandango for a single concert in Mexico at "Asha Fest" where they performed two of their early hits, A Million Ways to Forget You and Cars, Fashion and Rock 'n' Roll .

On October 27, Fandango, again as a quintet (now without Lorena in the lineup) performed another single show with the group Matute in the Mexico City Arena. Interviews afterward hinted at their imminent return. At the beginning of 2019, Liliana left the group, reducing it to a quartet once again, made up of Alexa, Rocio, Anabella, and Sandra, who continued making appearances at different venues.

In September they were introduced as part of the cast of nostalgia project Gira Tour Pop & Rock in which former members of famous groups from the 1980s appeared. Groups such as Parchís, Timbiriche, Flans, Chamos and others were represented onstage at the first concert, presented on September 27 in the city of Monterrey. Like its predecessor seven years earlier, the show was a resounding success. One more date was scheduled in Guadalajara but that performance and the rest of the tour were canceled due to the COVID-19 pandemic. The lone original concert was recorded and will be subsequently released on DVD.

The group released a new single in 2021.

== Members ==
Original members

- Alexa Lozano (1985 to 1988) - later became a member of Timbiriche
- Evalinda Gonzales (1984 to 1988)
- Liliana García González (1985 to 1990)
- Maria Eugenia Arrambide Cantu "Moña" (1984 to 1990)
- Rocío Torres Segovia (1984 to 1991) - the only member to stay in the group throughout its entire existence

Replacement members

- Sandra Elizondo Guerra from 1988 to 1991 (she replaced Alexa)
- Janett Tamez Martinez from 1988 to 1991 (she replaced Evalinda)
- Anabella De Hoyos from 1990 to 1991(she replaced Liliana)
- Marlene Lorena Cortinas from 1990 - 1991(she replaced Moña)

Unknown members

- Diana Carolina (1984)
- Yadira Durán (1984)
- Jeannie Tamez Martinez and two friends (commercials for the store 1991)

== Music albums ==
- 1986 - Contrastes
- 1987 - Autos, Moda y Rock and Roll, EMI
- 1988 - ¡Hola! Qué Tal, EMI
- 1989 - Fandango / Sueños Magicos (Magical Dreams)
- 1990 - Volver A Ser Feliz

== Singles ==
- 1987 - Autos, Moda y Rock and Roll, From Self Titled Debut Album
- 1987 - Un Millón de Maneras de Olvidarte, From Autos, Moda y Rock and Roll album
- 1988 - ¡Hola! Que Tal, From Self Titled Album
- 1989 - Sueños Mágicos, From Fandango (also known as "Sueños Magicos" (Magical Dreams))
- 1989 - Todos Quieren Bailar Conmigo, From Fandango (also known as "Sueños Magicos" (Magical Dreams))
- 1989 - Dos Corazones en la Oscuridad, From Fandango (also known as "Sueños Magicos" (Magical Dreams))
- 1990 - Dame Aquel Martillo, From Volver a Ser Feliz album
- 1991 - Es Tu Voz, From Volver a Ser Feliz album

Compilations

- 1991 - 16 Super Exitos, EMI
- 1997 - Mis Momentos, EMI
