= Zorro David =

Philippines-born American actor (1923–2008)

- Born: 1924; Orani, Bataan, Philippines
- Died: 2008 (aged 83–84); Schaumburg, Illinois, U.S.

Zorro David (1923–2008) was a Philippines-born American actor, best known for his role as Anacleto in the 1967 film Reflections in a Golden Eye. His camp portrayal has in later years earned interest from Philippine studies and queer studies scholars. Previously, he had achieved success as a celebrity hairstylist and in later life he became known as an abstract expressionist painter.
