= Abre las Ventanas al Amor =

Single by Roberto Carlos

from the album Sonríe
- Released: 1990
- Recorded: 1989
- Genre: Latin pop · latin ballad
- Length: 4:15
- Label: Discos CBS International
- Songwriter: Roberto Livi
- Producer: Roberto Livi · Mauro Motta

Roberto Carlos singles chronology
"Si Me Vas a Olvidar" (1989)	"Abre las Ventanas al Amor" (1990)	"Se Divierte y No Piensa en Mí" (1990)

Abre las Ventanas al Amor (English: Open the Windows to Love) is a song performed by Brazilian singer-songwriter Roberto Carlos and included on his studio album Sonríe (1989). It was written and produced by Argentinean singer-songwriter Roberto Livi and co-produced by Mauro Motta and released in 1990 as the second single from the album. The song became Carlos' second number-one hit in the Billboard Top Latin Songs chart after "Si El Amor Se Va" (1988) and his seventh top ten single in the chart.

Chart (1990)	Peak position
U.S. Billboard Hot Latin Tracks	1
