= Tatiana (singer) =

Mexican singer

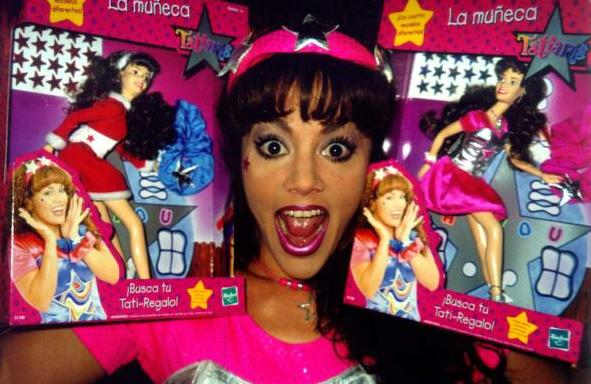
- Tatiana in 2016

Background information
- Born: Tatiana Palacios Chapa; 12 December 1968 (age 57)
- Origin: Monterrey, Nuevo León
- Genres: Pop; rock; children's music
- Occupations: Singer; actress; television presenter
- Instrument: Vocals
- Years active: 1984–present
- Labels: Balboa; Capitol/EMI Latin; Disa; Discos Columbia; Discos Gas; EMI; Epic; Fantil; Fonovisa; Paramúsica; PolyGram; Rodven; Universal
- Website: www.tatiana.tv

Tatiana Palacios Chapa (born 12 December 1968), known mononymously as Tatiana, is a Mexican singer, actress and television presenter. Referred to as the "Queen of Kids", she has been nominated for five Latin Grammy Awards for Best Children's Album and has sold over 9 million records.

== Early life ==
Tatiana was born on 12 December 1968 in Philadelphia, while her father was attending the University of Pennsylvania. A foreign-born Mexican citizen, Tatiana was raised in Monterrey, Mexico, by her parents, Dr. José Ramón Palacios Ortega and Diana Perla Chapa de Palacios, after her father's studies were completed in Pennsylvania. In 1990, she married Andres Puentes, they separated in 2001, and they got divorced in May 18th, 2005

== Early career and pop music ==
Tatiana's first major musical project was as the character Jane in the 1984 live stage performance, Kuman, a Mexican rock opera about a Tarzan-like character. The show's 1984 album soundtrack also entitled Kuman was released under the group name, Cristal y Acero ‒ the rock trio consisting of guitarist Icar Smith, bassist Carlos Ortega, and drummer Samuel Shapiro.

IN 1986, Tatiana released a single and filmed a video, both titled Cuando Estemos Juntos, with former Menudo member, Puerto Rican singer Johnny Lozada. The song was meant to create awareness among youth in Puerto Rico, Mexico and the rest of Latin America about the potential consequences of sex before marriage, including sexually transmitted diseases and pregnancy at an early age.

From 1984 to 1994, Tatiana released 10 pop music albums which garnered numerous hits throughout Mexico and some parts of Latin America.

== Career as children's entertainer ==
In 1995, Tatiana began releasing children's music albums.

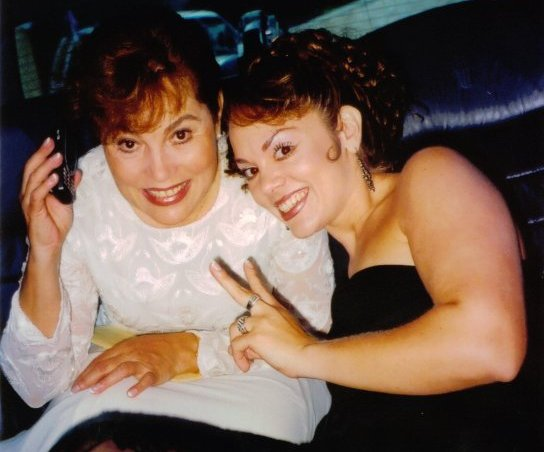
Tatiana (right) with her mother at the 2003 Latin Grammys in Miami, Florida

From 1997 to 2001, Tatiana hosted the children's television show, El Espacio de Tatiana on the Mexican network Televisa. She would later host another children's television show, El Show De Tatiana, on TV Azteca (version de El Show de Xuxa). She had also performed voice-over work and recorded soundtrack songs for various television and film projects produced by The Walt Disney Company. She provided her voice to the character Megara in the Latin American Spanish dub of Disney's Hercules (1997).

In 2004, she appeared as the character Coral on the Mexican telenovela, Amy, la niña de la mochila azul.

In 2016, she returned to Televisa, appearing in programs such as Hoy and Recuerda y Gana.

== Return to pop music ==
In 2005, she released her first non-children's album in over a decade entitled Acústico – Mil Gracias, an unplugged acoustic album with renditions of some of her earlier pop hits as well a number of new songs including two in English.

Her 2007 tour had 56 sold-out concerts, and her subsequent 2008 tour, Espapirifárctico, covered 64 concert dates throughout five countries.

== Select discography ==
=== Pop music ===
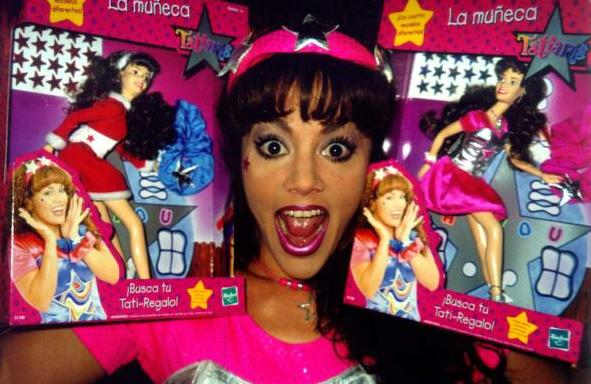
Tatiana holding two dolls based on her

- 1984: Tatiana
- 1986: Chicas de Hoy
- 1987: Baila Conmigo
- 1988: Un Lobo En La Noche
- 1989: Las Cosas Que He Visto
- 1990: Vientos de Libertad
- 1992: Leyes del Corazón
- 1994: Un Alma Desnuda
- 2005: Acústico – Mil Gracias
- 2014: Reencuentro Conmigo

=== Children's music ===
- 1995: Brinca
- 1996: Brinca II
- 1996: Navidad Con Tatiana
- 1997: Sigue La Magia
- 1997: Navidad Mágica
- 1998: Superfantástico
- 1999: Vamos A Jugar
- 1999: Navidad Mágica 2
- 2000: Acapulco Rock
- 2002: Los Mejores Temas De Las Películas De Walt Disney Vol. 1
- 2003: Los Mejores Temas De Las Películas De Walt Disney Vol. 2
- 2003: El Regalo 1
- 2005: El Regalo 2
- 2006: Aventuras En Tatilandia
- 2006: Tu Regalo De Navidad
- 2007: Espapirifáctico
- 2009: Te Quiero
- 2011: El Mundo De Tatiana
- 2012: Llegó Navidad
- 2015: Salta Sin Parar
- 2021: Kidsongs Vol. 1

=== Other ===
- 1984: Cristal y Acero ‒ Kuman
