= Magneto (band) =

Latin pop musical ensemble

- Origin: Mexico City, Mexico
- Genres: Latin pop
- Years active: 1983–1996; 2001; 2009–present

Magneto is a popular Mexican boy band of the 1980s and 1990s. The band formed on February 14, 1983. In 1986, Magneto was featured in "Siempre en Domingo," a Mexican entertainment show viewed across Latin America and parts of Europe. Mexican teen pop group Magneto emerged in 1983. Their first record, Dejalo Que Gire came in 1984, followed by Super 6 Magneto. The Latin pop outfit suffered several lineup changes before achieving their first gold record in 1986. Mostly playing dance-pop songs, the five-member ensemble started touring Central America after climbing charts with "Todo Esta Muy Bien," and "Soy Un Soñador." However, their breakthrough came after issuing a Spanish-language version of Desireless' "Voyage, voyage," a French pop hit from the '80s. In 1992 the boy band played the lead in their own movie, Cambiando el Destino. Magneto won the Lo Nuestro Award for Pop New Artist of the Year, and received two nominations for the Lo Nuestro Awards of 1993: Pop Album (Magneto) and Pop Group of the Year. Nevertheless, the original Magneto disbanded in 1996 after a sold-out show at Mexico City's Auditorio Nacional.

A number of former Magneto members (the group's 1993-1996 lineup of Alan Ibarra, Mauri Stern, Elias Cervantes, Toño Beltraneña, and Hugo de la Barreda, better known as Alex) reunited in 2009.

In 2016, Magneto toured with Mercurio, a 1990s Mexican boy band. In 2017, they toured with Sentidos Opuestos, Mercurio and Kabah as part of the Únete a la fiesta concert series of 1990s pop music nostalgia. Another original member of the group was Xavier Fux, he became a famous DJ

== Original members ==
- Elías Cervantes (1984–1996/2001/2009–present)
- Juan Botello (1984–1987)
- Pepe Ovadia (1984–1986)
- Xavier Fux (1984–1985)
- Alan (1984–1985)
- Eddie (1984)

== Later members ==
- Alfredo (1985–1986)
- Enrique (1985–1986)
- Mauri Stern (1986–1996/2001/2009–present)
- Marcos (1986–1987)
- Eduardo (1986)
- Danny (1988)
- Carlos (1988)
- Hugo De la Barreda (Alex) (1988–1996/2001/2009–present)
- Alan Ibarra (1989–1996/2001/2009–present)
- Charlie (1989–1994/2001)
- Toño Beltraneña (1994–1996/2009–present)

== Discography ==
=== Albums ===
- Dejalo Que Gire (1983)
- Tremendo (1986)
- Todo Esta Muy Bien (1987)
- 40 Grados (1989)
- Vuela, Vuela (1991)
- Cambiando El Destino (1992)
- Más (1993)
- Tu Libertad (1994)
- Siempre (1995)
- XMagneto (2001)

=== Singles ===
Year	Single	Album
1983	"Déjalo Que Gire"	Déjalo Que Gire
1986	"Suena Tremendo"	Tremendo
1986	"Adolescencia"	Tremendo
1987	"Un Amigo Es"	Tremendo
1987	"Todo Esta Muy Bien"	Todo Esta Muy Bien
1987	"Soy Un Soñador"	Todo Esta Muy Bien
1988	"Mi Clase De Amor"	Todo Esta Muy Bien
1989	"Tu Mejor Amigo"	40 Grados
1989	"Ven A Mí"	40 Grados
1989	"Amor A Mogollón"	40 Grados
1990		40 Grados
1990	"40 Grados"	40 Grados
1990	"Obsesionado"	40 Grados
1990	"Las Palabras" (with Angélica Vale)	40 Grados
1991	"Vuela, Vuela"	Vuela, Vuela
1991	"Mira, Mira, Mira"	Vuela, Vuela
1992		Vuela, Vuela
1992	"La Puerta Del Colegio"	Vuela, Vuela
1992	"Déjame Estar A Tu Lado"	Vuela, Vuela
1992	"Para Siempre"	Vuela, Vuela
1992	"Reza Por Mí"	Vuela, Vuela
1992	"Cambiando El Destino"	Cambiando El Destino
1993	"Sugar, Sugar"	Más
1993	"Angie"	Más
1993	"Mi Amada"	Más
1993	"Por Primera Vez"	Más
1993	"Cómo Pega El Son"	Más
1994		Más
1994	"Que Sensación"	Más
1994	"Sueño Por Sueño"	Más
1994	"Tu Libertad"	Tu Libertad
1994	"Malherido"	Tu Libertad
1995		Tu Libertad
1995	"Por Nada Del Mundo"	Tu Libertad
1995	"Eva María"	Tu Libertad
1995	"Siempre Cerca De Mí"	Tu Libertad
1995	"Mentira Para Dos"	Tu Libertad
1995	"Yo Seré De Ti"	Tu Libertad
1995	"A Corazón Abierto"	Siempre
1996		Siempre
1996	"No Sé Decir Adiós"	Siempre
1996	"Corazón Perfecto"	Siempre
1996	"Obsesión"	Siempre
2001	"Una Y Otra Vez"	X-Magneto

== Films ==
Film
Year	Title	Roles	Notes
1992	Cambiando El Destino	Acting as fictionalised versions of themselves	Musical comedy film

== Awards ==
- 42 gold albums (representing 4.5 million records)
- 7 platinum albums
- 1 diamond album
- Eres award for:
  - Best Pop Group
  - Best Album
  - Best Video
  - Best Movie
  - Best Song
- TVyNovelas Award for "Best Pop Group"
- Galardón a los Grandes de la Música award
- Lo Nuestro Awards
- La Antorcha at the Viña del Mar Festival
