= Raúl Velasco =

Mexican television presenter

- Born: Raúl Velasco Ramírez; April 24, 1933; Celaya, Guanajuato, Mexico
- Died: November 26, 2006 (aged 73); Polanco, Ciudad de Mexico, Mexico
- Occupations: TV Host, Producer

Raúl Velasco Ramírez (April 24, 1933 – November 26, 2006) was a Mexican host/producer of the TV show Siempre en Domingo (Always on Sunday) which is his hallmark contribution to the Latin American world and eventually to other parts of the world where Spanish entertainment programs are broadcast.

Velasco began this program as co-host of a Sunday afternoon special in 1969 called Domingos Espectaculares (Spectacular Sundays). One of his catch phrases was, "Aún hay más" ("There's more to follow"). For a short while, Siempre en Domingo was known as Aún hay más because he would always say these words prior to each intermission or commercial, with the hand gesture that corresponds to a request for a commercial break, similar to what Frank Sinatra might have said or sung, The best is yet to come. . . The phrase and hand gesture became popular in Mexico as a result. (y aún hay más... amigos!)

== Biography ==
Velasco was born in Celaya, Mexico on April 24, 1933. Coming from a family with few resources, he started working at an early age. He worked first at his family store, called La Violeta, a small grocery. He also worked as a messenger, tractor operator (agriculture machinery), and driver.

When he was very young, he married Hortensia Ruiz. They had three children: Raúl, Claudia, and Arturo. Some years later, he divorced Ruiz and married Dorle Klokow. In this second marriage with Dorle, Karina and Diego were born.

When he was twenty years old, he fulfilled one of his dreams: to move to Mexico City. He began working as an accountant for the National Bank of Mexico. At the same time, he began to write. He wrote many sports articles, and then he started writing for a magazine called Novelas de la radio. Furthermore, he wrote for Cine Universal, Cine Novelas, and Cine Álbum.

Velasco made his mark in the world of the theater when he became the head of the entertainment section of the El Heraldo de Mexico newspaper. He also worked on the radio station Radio Variedades. In addition, he started working on the Independent Television of Mexico (TIM) as a host, first with the program La reseña cinematografica de Acapulco, and then he participated in some open TV programs like Confrontación 68, Media Noche, and Domingos Espectaculares.

On December 13, 1969, Siempre en Domingo was born. This program was one of the most popular TV musical programs in history. It was broadcast in the United States, Central and South America, Europe, and Asia via satellite. It was a program of Televisa Company. As time went by, Velasco became an international artistic icon. He created some TV shows too. Some of them were Estrellas de los ochenta, Juguemos a Cantar, and Galardón a los grandes. He hosted the OTI Festival in 1974, 1976, 1981, 1984, and 1991, in addition to all the Mexican national selections for the festival between 1972 and 1990.

== Career ==
His career started with his first contact with journalism in a sports magazine that was published in Celaya, Guanajuato where he wrote articles about frontenis, the sport he practiced. At the age of 20, Velasco traveled to Mexico City to work for the magazine Radio Novels. After that, he collaborated with Cine Universal, Cine Novelas and Cine Álbum. From these publications, other newspapers came through like Novedades and then El Heraldo, where he was the editor of the entertainment and show section.

In 1969, he joined Television Independiente de México (now Televisa). Aside from his famous show, he was also an actor on programs such as Medianoche, Domingos espectaculares, Reseña cinematográfica de Acapulco, Confrontación 68 and El tigre. In 1998, he was fired by Televisa even though his show had high ratings because of some differences with his co-workers. Despite his bad relationship with Televisa, the popularity of the host influenced many important artists to give him a tribute for his brilliant career, and also for entering Mexican homes for almost 30 years.

In 2002, he published his first book, Reflexiones, para vivir mejor. It was composed of stories, tales and reflections where the author makes reference to topics of ethics and essential elements of spiritual life. The book was dedicated to all the people that search within their souls for all the feelings that have been hidden since childhood.

== Siempre en Domingo ==
On September 13, 1969, a new musical variety show came out on television, becoming the most popular and traditional in Mexico: Siempre en Domingo (Always on Sunday). This TV show achieved fame in USA, Latin America, Asia and Europe.

Siempre en Domingo was a TV show where many artists performed and debuted.

In the beginning, most of the artists performing on Siempre en Domingo were from Spain, Central and South America. However, the TV show became more and more popular, and soon many Mexican singers wanted to perform as well.

The show was very criticized for its very low quality, the usage of pre-recorded material, lip sync, and fake musicians.

It is commented that Siempre en Domingo was a "Pay to perform" kind of show so Mr. Velasco would decide whom to present in regards of wealth or connections and not talent. It is also mentioned in some books that he worked as a contact between "artistas" and many politicians and businessmen who could hire them as escorts for high-profile parties and events, this practice was supported by Televisa to keep the favors of the government and sponsors, and tolerated by the artists due to the exposure that the show represented.

Velasco, the host, encouraged many singers such as Luis Miguel, Chayanne, Ricardo Arjona, Emmanuel, Manuel Mijares, Yuri, Timbiriche, Lynda Thomas, Maná and many others. Moreover, Velasco presented foreign artists such as Julio Iglesias, Raphael, Miguel Bosé and Ricky Martin. Furthermore, he encouraged announcers, commentators, producers, reporters, and writers. Some of these artists became famous around the world while most have been struggling to stay in the business. Many festivals such as OTI, Valores Juveniles (Juvenile's values), Juguemos a Cantar (Let's play singing) were promoted.

Later, Siempre en Domingo became one of the most popular TV shows in Latin America. Velasco's popular phrase, "patada de la suerte" (lucky kick), sponsored many artists that every Sunday performed in his popular TV show.

Siempre en Domingo had about 420 million television viewers around the world (according to Televisa and their partners)

Many singers, choreographers, recording companies and fans found their roots in this TV show. Some say that thanks to Siempre en Domingo, show business in Mexico was able to thrive. Some others think that it was an impossible for performers with real talent but no means due to the conservative profile of the show and the will to keep the Status Quo at all costs.

All things come to and end and Siempre en Domingo closed a chapter in musical history of Spanish-speaking nations.

Siempre en Domingo was on air until 1998 when Velasco was diagnosed with Hepatitis C, and decided to retire. The last shows were held at Teatro Alameda in Mexico city.

Some years later, in 2003, Marco Antonio Regil planned to direct a new TV show similar to Siempre en Domingo, keeping the "familiar values" and "originality". This new musical TV show, known as Gran Musical expected to have popular acts and not so popular acts in order to maintain happy and satisfied fans.

Several international acts performed on the show since 1969 until early 1998, including Tina Turner, The Bee Gees, David Lee Roth, Whitney Houston, Bryan Adams, Peter Cetera, Richard Clayderman, Richard Marx, The Bangles, Cyndi Lauper, Olivia Newton-John, Barry Manilow, Laura Branigan, Village People, Donna Summer, Shaun Cassidy, Gloria Gaynor, Sheena Easton, Crowded House, Boney M, KWS, Spice Girls, Sammy Davis Jr, Andy Gibb, Jimmy Osmond, Princess Stéphanie of Monaco, Level 42, The Outfield and Sting among many others.

== Death and family ==
Velasco developed several heart and liver problems. He had been in the hospital several times, but the last time he became ill, he decided to be taken care of at home. On November 26, 2006, he died of complications of hepatitis C at 7:15 am. He was 73 years old. He died surrounded by his family in his house located in Polanco, Mexico City.

Velasco's funeral was a national event. His body was buried in the "Panteón Francés" where many fans, performers, and press congregated to give him the last goodbye.

Velasco was survived by Dorle, his wife of 31 years, 3 sons and 2 daughters: Arturo, who works as director of Televisa Music in Mexico; Claudia, who works as an interior designer; Raúl, who owns a landscaping company in Mexico; Diego, who works as independent TV producer in Mexico and the US; and Karina who followed her father's footsteps by becoming a TV host herself but only remained active while her father was on the top. At the time of his death, he had 5 grandsons and one granddaughter.
