= Tito El Bambino discography =

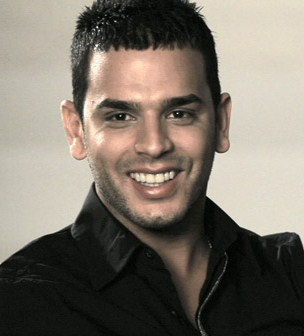
- Tito El Bambino on January 31, 2011
- Studio albums: 7
- Extended plays: 1
- Compilation albums: 1
- Singles: 33
- Music videos: 26

The discography of Tito El Bambino, a Puerto Rican singer, consists of seven studio albums, and One Greatest Hits album on EMI Televisa and Universal Music Latino/Siente Music. Collaborations are also included.

Tito El Bambino was with Héctor el Father and formed a duo called Héctor & Tito. They released six albums before parting ways.

After leaving Héctor el Father, Tito El Bambino released his first studio album, Top of the Line in 2006, which produced the hit singles "Caile", "Flow Natural", and "Mia" with Daddy Yankee. The same year, he released a Special Edition, "Top of the Line: El Internacional." It features 5 bonus new songs that were not included in the original version: "Siente El Boom (Remix)", "Enamorado", "Calentándote", "Bailarlo" and "Voy a Mí". The first single of the album is "Siente El Boom (Remix)" that is a big hit in Argentina. "Siente El Boom" is also on Chosen Few II: El Documental featuring Randy.

In 2007, he released his second commercial album It's My Time, which went just as big as Top of the Line. Artists featured on the album include R.K.M & Ken-Y, Pharrell, Toby Love, Jadiel, and Arcángel.

In 2009, Tito El Bambino's third solo album, El Patrón was released. The included includes his fellow reggaeton artists Zion & Lennox, and Plan B. Some chart toppers of this album include "El Amor" and "Under".

== Albums ==
=== Studio albums ===
Year	Title	Peak chart positions					Certifications (sales thresholds)	Sales
Year	Title	US	US LATIN	US RAP	US TROP.	MEX	Certifications (sales thresholds)	Sales
2006	Top of the Line: Released: April 4, 2006; Label: EMI Latin; Format: CD, digital download	85	3	—	—	—	RIAA: Platinum (Latin)	US: 100,000
2007	It's My Time: Released: October 2, 2007; Label: EMI Latin; Format: CD, digital download	167	8	—	—	—		
2009	El Patrón: Released: March 24, 2009; Label: Universal Latino, Siente; Format: CD	138	1	18	—	33	RIAA: 2× Platinum (Latin)	World: 1,000,000; US: 146,947
2011	Invencible: Released: February 8, 2011; Label: Siente; Format: CD	95	4	8	—	21	RIAA: Gold (Latin)	US: 46,375
2012	Invicto: Released: November 19, 2012; Label: On Fire; Format: CD, digital download	—	1	—	1	—	RIAA: Gold (Latin)	US: 30,000
2014	Alta Jerarquía: Released: November 24, 2014; Label: On Fire; Format: CD, digital download	—	3	18	—	—		
2020	El Muñeco: Released: 2020; Label: On Fire; Format: CD, digital download	—	—	—	—	—		
2025	La Gente del Patrón: Released: 2025; Label: El Patron Music; Format: digital download	—	—	—	—	—		

=== Reissue albums ===
Year	Title	Peak chart positions
Year	Title	US LATIN
2007	Top of the Line: El Internacional: Released: February 6, 2007; Label: EMI Latin; Format: CD, digital download	50
2010	El Patrón: La Victoria: Released: January 26, 2010; Label: Siente; Format: CD	10
2011	Invencible 2012: Released: November 21, 2011; Label: Siente; Format: CD, digital download	—
2015	Alta Jerarquía: Instrumental: Released: May 26, 2015; Label: On Fire; Format: Digital download	—

=== EPs ===
Year	Title
2007	Top of the Line: El Internacional (EP): Released: February 6, 2007; Label: EMI Televisa; Format: Digital download

=== Compilation albums ===
Year	Title	Peak chart positions
Year	Title	US LATIN
2010	Hits: Released: July 23, 2010; Label: Capitol Latin; Format: CD, digital download	65

== Singles ==
Year	Title	Peak chart positions				Certifications (sales thresholds)	Album
Year	Title	US LATIN	US TROP.	US LATIN POP	US Rhythm	Certifications (sales thresholds)	Album
2005	"Me Pidieron Acción"	—	33	—	—		Los Kambumbos: Tierra de Nadie
2005	"La Cazadora"	38	8	—	16		Los Cazadores: Primera Búsqueda
2006	"Caile"	2	1	—	2		Top of the Line
2006	"Flow Natural" (Featuring Beenie Man and Deevani)	16	21	—	6		Top of the Line
2006	"Mía" (Featuring Daddy Yankee)	12	9	—	—		Top of the Line
2006	"Siente El Boom" (Featuring Randy)	14	9	—	3		Chosen Few II: El Documental
2007	"Solo Dime Que Sí"	9	10	—	2		It's My Time
2007	"El Tra"	21	8	—	6		It's My Time
2007	"En La Disco"	—	29	—	33		It's My Time
2008	"Vamos Pa'l Agua"	46	21	—	—		Non-album single
2009	"Under"	—	40	—	6		El Patrón
2009	"El Amor"	1	1	3	1		El Patrón
2009	"Mi Cama Huele A Ti" (Featuring Zion & Lennox)	3	1	13	1		El Patrón
2009	"El Amor" (Salsa Version) (Featuring La India)	—	—	—	—		Non-album single
2009	"Feliz Navidad"	15	10	10	8		El Patrón: La Victoria
2010	"Te Pido Perdón"	3	2	4	1		El Patrón: La Victoria
2010	"Te Comencé a Querer"	24	4	34	5		El Patrón: La Victoria
2010	"Llueve el Amor"	5	1	3	1		Invencible
2011	"Llama Al Sol"	11	4	9	—		Invencible
2011	"Llueve el Amor" (Salsa Version) (Featuring Jerry Rivera)	—	—	—	—		Non-album single
2011	"Llama Al Sol" (Zumba Version) (Featuring Daniel Mercury)	—	—	—	—		Non-album single
2011	"Llama Al Sol" (Remix) (Featuring Farruko)	—	—	—	—		Non-album single
2011	"Me Toca Celebrar"	34	—	25	7		Invencible 2012
2012	"Me Voy De La Casa"	21	3	26	—		Invencible 2012
2012	"Me Voy De La Casa" (Salsa Version) (Featuring Tito Rojas)	—	—	—	—		Non-album single
2012	"Dame La Ola"	1	1	10	—		Invicto
2012	"¿Por Qué Les Mientes?" (Featuring Marc Anthony)	1	1	—	—	RIAA: Platinum (Latin)	Invicto
2013	"Tu Olor"	20	4	14	3		Invicto
2013	"Tu Olor" (Remix) (Featuring Wisin)	—	—	—	—		Invicto
2013	"Carnaval"	5	1	4	—		Invicto
2013	"Tu Olor" (Salsa version) (Featuring José Alberto, Domingo Quiñones and Luisito Carrión)	—	—	—	—		Non-album single (Note: non-album single)
2013	"Nací Aquí"	41	—	38	—		Non-album single
2014	"El Gran Perdedor"	—	1	22	—		Non-album single
2014	"La Calle Lo Pidió" (Featuring Cosculluela)	—	—	—	19		Alta Jerarquía
2014	"Controlando"	—	—	—	—		Alta Jerarquía
2014	"A Que No Te Atreves" (Featuring Chencho)	26	1	14	1		Alta Jerarquía
2014	"Gatilleros" (Featuring Cosculluela)	—	—	—	25		Alta Jerarquía
2014	"Adicto A Tus Redes" (Featuring Nicky Jam)	45	10	14	6		Alta Jerarquía
2015	"Nena Mala" (Featuring Wisin)	—	—	—	20		Alta Jerarquía
2015	"Rampapam" (Featuring Zion and Pusho)	—	—	—	—		Non-album single
2015	"Conmigo No Pueden"	—	—	—	—		Non-album single
2015	"Me Quedé Con Las Ganas"	27	2	17	—		Melodías de Oro
2016	"Shalala"	38	7	26	10		Non-album single
2016	"Ay Mami" (Featuring Bryant Myers)	—	—	—	—	RIAA: Gold (Latin)	Non-album single

Other charted songs

Year	Title	Peak chart positions			Album
Year	Title	US LATIN	US TROP.	US LATIN POP	Album
2005	"Déjala Volar"	—	33	—	Mas Flow 2
2011	"Máquina Del Tiempo" (Featuring Wisin & Yandel)	4	3	6	Invencible
2014	"Como Antes" (Featuring Zion & Lennox)	20	4	22	Alta Jerarquía

== Collaborations ==
Year	Title	Other artist(s)	Album
2005	«Déjala Volar» (Remix)	Eddie Dee	Non-album single
2006	«Mía»	Daddy Yankee	Top of the Line
2006	«Tu Cintura»	Don Omar	Top of the Line
2006	«Flow Natural»	Beenie Man and Deevani	Top of the Line
2006	«Siente El Boom»	Randy	Chosen Few II: El Documental
2007	«Siente El Boom» (Remix)	Jowell & Randy and De La Ghetto	Top of the Line: El Internacional
2007	«Caile» (Remix)	Zion, Daddy Yankee, Julio Voltio and Angel Doze	Top of the Line: El Internacional
2007	«Flow Natural» (Remix)	Beenie Man, Deevani and Don Omar	Top of the Line: El Internacional
2007	«Fans»	Rakim & Ken-Y	It's My Time
2007	«Booty»	Pharrell Williams	It's My Time
2007	«La Busco»	Toby Love	It's My Time
2007	«Sol, Playa Y Arena»	Jadiel	It's My Time
2008	«En La Disco» (Remix)	Olga Tañón	Fuego En Vivo, Vol. 1
2009	«Mi Cama Huele A Ti»	Zion & Lennox	El Patrón
2009	«Agárrala»	Plan B	El Patrón
2010	«El Amor» (Salsa version)	La India	El Patrón: La Victoria
2010	«El Amor» (Regional Mexican version)	Jenni Rivera	El Patrón: La Victoria
2011	«Máquina Del Tiempo»	Wisin & Yandel	Invencible
2011	«Éramos Niños»	Gilberto Santa Rosa and Héctor Acosta	Invencible
2011	«Chequea Cómo Se Siente»	Daddy Yankee	Invencible
2011	«Quiero Besarte»	J King & Maximan	Invencible
2011	«Basta Ya»	Noel Schajris	Invencible
2011	«Llueve el Amor» (Banda version)	Banda El Recodo	Invencible
2011	«Dime Cómo Te Va»	Emmanuel Fines	Invencible
2011	«Quiere Que Le Muestre»	Ñengo Flow and Julio Voltio	Invencible 2012
2011	«No Está En Na'»	Farruko	Invencible 2012
2012	«¿Por Qué Les Mientes?»	Marc Anthony	Invicto
2012	«Me Gustas»	Yandel	Invicto
2012	«Alzo Mi Voz»	Tercer Cielo	Invicto
2012	«Dame La Ola» (Salsa version)	Tito Nieves	Invicto
2013	«Tu Olor» (Remix)	Wisin	Invicto
2013	«Tu Olor» (Salsa version)	José Alberto, Domingo Quiñones and Luisito Carrión	Non-album single (Note: non-album single)
2014	«La Calle Lo Pidió»	Cosculluela	Alta Jerarquía
2014	«A Que No Te Atreves»	Chencho	Alta Jerarquía
2014	«Gatilleros»	Cosculluela	Alta Jerarquía
2014	«Como Antes»	Zion & Lennox	Alta Jerarquía
2014	«Adicto A Tus Redes»	Nicky Jam	Alta Jerarquía
2014	«Miénteme»	Anthony Santos	Alta Jerarquía
2014	«Adicta Al Sexo»	Randy	Alta Jerarquía
2014	«¿Qué Les Pasó?»	Vico C	Alta Jerarquía
2014	«Compromiso»	Alexis & Fido	Alta Jerarquía
2014	«Ricos Y Famosos»	Wisin and Ñengo Flow	Alta Jerarquía
2014	«A Que No Te Atreves» (Remix)	Chencho, Yandel and Daddy Yankee	Alta Jerarquía
2014	«Hay Que Comer»	Andy Montañéz	Alta Jerarquía
2014	«Nena Mala»	Wisin	Alta Jerarquía
2014	«Nosotros»	Yomo	non-album single
2015	«Él Está Celoso» (Remix)	Yandel	non-album single
2015	«Gatilleros» (Remix)	Farruko, Arcángel, Cosculluela, Ñengo Flow, Tempo, Kendo Kaponi, Alexio, El Sica, Almighty, Pusho, J Álvarez, Juanka, Genio and Benny Benni	non-album single

== Album appearances ==
Year	Title	Other artist(s)	Album
2003	«A Que No Te Atreves»		Gárgolas, Vol. 4: The Best Reggaeton
2004	«Te Encontraré»		Contra La Corriente
2004	«Duelo»		El Que Habla Con Las Manos
2005	«Déjala Volar»		Mas Flow 2
2006	«Frente A Él»		Sin Control
2006	«Esta Noche»		Mas Flow: Los Benjamins
2006	«Siente El Boom»	Randy	Chosen Few II: El Documental
2007	«Que Lloren» (Remix)	Ivy Queen, Naldo and Arcángel	Sentimiento: Platinum Edition
2007	«Maldito Amor» (Urban version)	Andy Andy	Tú Me Haces Falta
2008	«Fever»	Lena	La Mala
2009	«Hasta Que Salga El Sol»	Jowell & Randy	Tengan Paciencia
2009	«No Sé Si Estás Sola»	Trebol Clan	The Producers
2010	«Me Enteré»	Daddy Yankee	Mundial
2010	«La Nena De Papi»	Plan B	House of Pleasure
2011	«Se Acabó»	Wisin & Yandel	Los Vaqueros: El Regreso
2012	«Dámelo»		El Imperio Nazza: Gold Edition
2012	«Underground»		A Lo Under, Vol. 1
2013	«Solo Quiero Amor»	Limi-T 21	Party & Dance
2015	«No Hay Quien La Pare»	J Álvarez	Desde Puerto Rico Live
2015	«Quiero Probar»	Baby Rasta & Gringo	Los Cotizados
2015	«Los Vaqueros»	Wisin, Gavilán, Arcángel, Baby Rasta, Cosculluela, Franco El Gorila, J Álvarez, Farruko, Pusho and Jenay	Los Vaqueros: La Trilogía
2015	«Hace Calor»	J King & Maximan	Volvieron Los Rastrilleros
2015	«Cacería De Nenotas»	Clandestino & Yailemm, Plan B, Daddy Yankee, Amaro, Pinto and Pusho	Equilibrium
Non-album collaborations
2010	«Se Me Va La Voz» (Urban version)	Alejandro Fernandez	non-album single
2012	«La Pregunta» (Remix)	J Álvarez and Daddy Yankee	non-album single
2013	«Sistema» (Remix)	Wisin, Jory, Cosculluela and Eddie Dee	non-album single
2015	«Pensando En Ti»	Kevin Roldan	non-album single
2015	«Bajito» (Remix)	Jencarlos Canela and Ky-Mani Marley	non-album single
2015	«Dale Pa' La Calle» (Remix)	La Tribu De Abrante and Elvis Crespo	non-album single
2015	«Me Enamoré» (Remix)	Angel & Khriz and Elvis Crespo	non-album single
2015	«Esto Es Normal»	Óptimo	non-album single
2016	«Punto 40» (Remix)	Baby Rasta & Gringo, Pusho, Zion, Alexio and Tempo	non-album single
2016	«Ya Me Enteré»	Egwa and Ozuna	non-album single
2016	«Juguetona» (Remix)	Yomo, Farruko and Wisin	non-album single

== Music videos ==
Year	Title	Other artist(s)	Album
2005	«Déjala Volar»		Mas Flow 2
2006	«Caile»		Top of the Line
2006	«Flow Natural»	Beenie Man and Deevani	Top of the Line
2007	«Siente El Boom» (Remix)	Jowell & Randy and De La Ghetto	Top of the Line: El Internacional
2007	«Enamorado»		Top of the Line: El Internacional
2007	«Bailarlo»		Top of the Line: El Internacional
2007	«Sol, Playa Y Arena»	Jadiel	It's My Time
2008	«El Tra»		It's My Time
2008	«En La Disco»		It's My Time
2008	«La Busco»	Toby Love	It's My Time
2008	«Vamos Pa'l Agua»		Non-album single
2009	«Under»		El Patrón
2009	«El Amor»		El Patrón
2009	«Te Comencé A Querer»		El Patrón
2010	«Feliz Navidad»		El Patrón: La Victoria
2010	«Te Pido Perdón»		El Patrón: La Victoria
2010	«Te Pido Perdón» (Banda version)	Banda El Recodo	Las Número Uno
2011	«Llama Al Sol»		Invencible
2011	«Me Voy De La Casa»		Invencible 2012
2012	«Dame La Ola»		Invicto
2012	«¿Por Qué Les Mientes?»	Marc Anthony	Invicto
2013	«Carnaval»		Invicto
2014	«A Que No Te Atreves»	Chencho	Alta Jerarquía
2014	«Controlando»		Alta Jerarquía
2014	«Adicto A Tus Redes»	Nicky Jam	Alta Jerarquía
2015	«Me Quedé Con Las Ganas»		Melodías de Oro
As featured performer
2015	«Bajito» (Remix)	Jencarlos Canela and Ky-Mani Marley	Non-album single
Cameo appearances without performing
2007	«Sensación Del Bloque»	De La Ghetto and Randy	non-album single
2015	«Palabras Con Sentido»	Daddy Yankee	non-album single

== See also ==
- Héctor & Tito discography
