= Lucero discography =

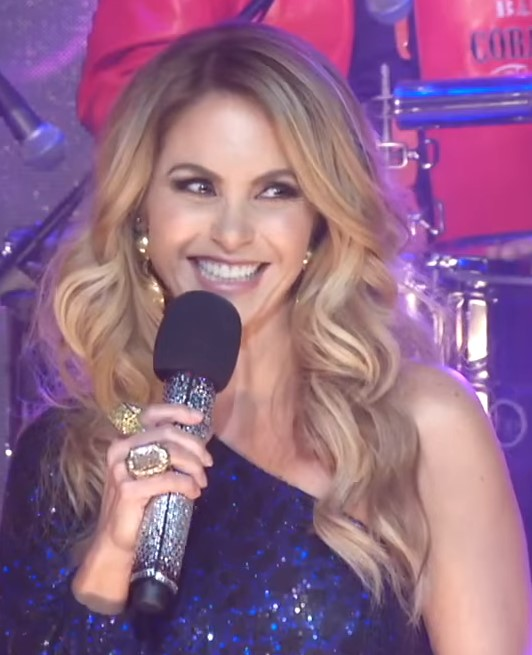
- Lucero in 2017
- Studio albums: 20
- Live albums: 2
- Singles: 74
- Music videos: 40

This is the discography of one of the most successful and prolific Mexican singers, Lucero, as of 2010, she has released 20 studio albums and two live albums; which has so far sold over 30 million albums worldwide.

== Studio albums ==
List of studio albums, with selected chart positions and certifications
Title	Album details	Peak chart positions					Certifications
Title	Album details	MEX	US 200	US Latin Album	US Latin Pop	US Regional Mex	Certifications
Te Prometo	Released: 1982; Label: Musart (#ED-1839)	—	—	—	—	—	
Con Tan Pocos Años	Released: 1984; Label: Musart (#EDTV 004)	—	—	—	—	—	
Fuego y Ternura	Released: 1985; Label: Musart (#EMTV 6007)	—	—	—	—	—	
Un Pedacito de Mí	Released: 1986; Label: Musart (#EMTV 6017)	—	—	—	—	—	
Lucerito	Released: 1988; Label: Melody (#MITV 150)	—	—	—	—	—	
Cuéntame	Released: 1989; Label: Melody (#MIPE 014)	—	—	—	—	—	
Con Mi Sentimiento	Released: 1990; Label: Melody (#MED 9008)	—	—	—	—	9	
Sólo Pienso en Ti	Released: 1991; Label: Melody (#TMOD 654)	—	—	—	7	—	
Lucero de México	Released: 1992; Label: Melody (#TMO 755)	—	—	45	—	6	
Lucero	Released: 1993; Label: Melody (#TMOD 857)	—	—	19	10	—	
Cariño de Mis Cariños	Released: 1994; Label: Melody (#TMO 1208)	—	—	3	—	2	
Siempre Contigo	Released: 1994; Label: Melody (#TMOD 1329)	—	—	—	15	—	
Piel de Ángel	Released: 1997; Label: Melody (#TMI 1976)	—	—	28	12	—	
Cerca de Ti	Released: 1998; Label: Melody (#TMOD 2239)	—	—	29	—	12	MEX: Platinum
Mi Destino	Released: 2000; Label: Sony (#CDCD 499060)	1	—	—	—	—	AMPROFON: Gold
Un Nuevo Amor	Released: 2002; Label: Sony (#CDCM 505623)	—	—	—	—	—	
Cuando Sale un Lucero	Released: 2004; Label: EMI (#724386369826)	—	—	—	—	—	AMPROFON: Gold
Quiéreme Tal Como Soy	Released: 2006; Label: EMI (#387465)	—	—	—	—	—	AMPROFON: Gold
Indispensable	Released: 2010; Label: Siente Music (#6550322)	16	172	4	3	—	
Mi Secreto de Amor	Released: 2011; Label: Siente Music (#6550322)	42	—	43	—	20	
Un Lu*Jo	Released: 2012; Label: Skalona Records (#6550322)	3	—	4	—	1	
Aquí Estoy	Released: 2014; Label: Universal	39	—	9	4	—	
Enamorada con Banda	Released: 2017; Label: Fonovisa	1	—	40	—	16	AMPROFON: Gold
Más Enamorada con Banda	Released: 2018; Label: Fonovisa	3	—		—	—	
Solo Me Faltabas Tú	Released: 2019; Label: Fonovisa	—	—		—	—	
"—" denotes releases that did not chart or was not released

== Live albums ==
List of studio albums, with selected chart positions and certifications
Title	Album details	Chart positions		Certifications
Title	Album details	MEX	US Latin Album	Certifications
Un Lucero en La México	Released: 1999; Label: Sony (#CDDE 2 486446)	1	—	AMPROFON: Gold
Lucero en Vivo Auditorio Nacional	Released: 2007; Label: Sony (#5099950675425)	25	—	
Lucero en Concierto	Released: 2013; Label: Universal Music	—	—	
Enamorada en Vivo	Released: 2018; Label: Universal Music	—	—	
Lucero Brasileira en Vivo	Released: 2019; Label: Universal Music	—	—	
"—" denotes releases that did not chart or was not released

== Special singles, soundtracks, EPs ==
Title	Album details	Chart positions
Title	Album details	MEX
Baile del Osito/El Pequeño Panda	Released: 1981; Label: Arpeggio (#1012)	—
Juguemos a Cantar	Released: 1982; Label: Musart (#ED 1823)	1
Los Chiquillos de la TV	Released: 1982; Label: Musart (#ED 1838)	—
20 Naviéxitos	Released: 1982; Label: Musart (#ED 1836)	—
América, Esta es Tu Canción	Released: 1982; Label: Melody (#MITV 006)	—
Disco Mensaje	Released: 1984; Label: Musart (#EX 46806)	—
Katy, La Oruga	Released: 1984; Label: Musart	—
Fiebre de Amor	Released: 1985; Label: EMI (#SLEMN 1291)	—
Keiko	Released: 1985; Label: Musart (#6591)	—
Escápate Conmigo	Released: 1988; Label: Melody (#SU 078)	—
Cuando Llega el Amor	Released: 1990; Label: Melody (#SU 084)	—
Lazos de Amor	Released: 1995; Label: Melody (#TMM 1620)	—
Lucero le Canta a la Virgen	Released: 1997; Label: Melody	—
Regina	Released: 2003; Label: Producciones Que Despiertan (#7503001700977)	—
"—" denotes releases that did not chart or was not released

== Compilations ==
Controversy

Most of the collections are not greater than 5,000 copies sales, and due to this, Lucero had some problems with Universal Music. As a result, the singer Lucero lifted a lawsuit against Universal Music record label for not having received royalties for sales of some of her albums in the last 14 years, when she belonged to Melody Records, now part of that company. She explained that in 1998 the company had agreed to pay what they owed, but until 2008 the debt was never paid off. Lucero said that after an audit that was done ten years ago, it was found that the debt remains and has accumulated over the years, and it was a very large amount.

Collections

Title	Album details
Los 15 Éxitos de Lucerito	Released: 1987; Label: Musart (#CMP 90024)
La Colección	Released: 1990; Label: Melody (#MED 9014)
La Novia de America	Released: 1991; Label: Melody (#TMD 674)
18 Hits	Released: 1982; Label: Melody (#TMM 829)
16 Kilates	Released: 1994; Label: Fonovisa (#FPCD 9208)
Éxitos Rancheros	Released: 1995; Label: Fonovisa (#FPCD 9339)
20 Kilates	Released: 1996; Label: Fonovisa (#TMO 1925)
Historia de una Romance	Released: 1997; Label: Melody (#TMO 2127)
Serie Millennium 21	Released: 1999; Label: Universal (#53377)
Hacia el Milenio con 21 Éxitos	Released: 1999; Label: Fonovisa (#TFT2 2827)
La Sensación de Lucero	Released: 2000; Label: Universal (#993)
Serie 32	Released: 2001; Label: Universal (#13208)
15 Éxitos	Released: 2002; Label: Fonovisa (#350532)
Trayectoria	Released: 2005; Label: Fonovisa (#100 6323)
Balada: Éxitos Para Siempre	Released: 2004; Label: Fonovisa (#050 6190)
20 Éxitos Originales	Released: 2005; Label: Sony BMG (#SNY 95847)
Apuesta Musical	Released: 2006; Label: Universal
Alborada de Éxitos	Released: 2006; Label: Fonovisa (#7350)
e5	Released: 2006; Label: Fonovisa (#784885)
10 de Colección	Released: 2007; Label: Sony BMG (#709721)
Versiones Originales	Released: 2008; Label: Fonovisa (#7908)
Mis Favoritas	Released: 2010; Label: Sony BMG (#771608)

== Singles ==
=== As lead artist ===
Title	Year	Chart Positions		Album
Title	Year	U.S. Hot Latin	U.S. Latin Airplay	Album
Él"	1982	–	–	Te Prometo
Te prometo"	1982	–	–	Te Prometo
América, ésta es tú canción"	1982	–	–	Te Prometo
Música"	1983	–	–	Con Tan Pocos Años
Con tan pocos años"	1984	–	–	Con Tan Pocos Años
Contigo"	1984	–	–	Con Tan Pocos Años
Fuego y ternura"	1985	–	–	Fuego y Ternura
Magia"	1985	–	–	Fuego y Ternura
Siempre te seguiré"	1985	–	–	Fuego y Ternura
Era la primera vez"	1986	17	–	Un Pedacito De Mí
Como musica de Rock'n'Roll"	1987	–	–	Un Pedacito De Mí
Vendrá"	1987	–	–	Un Pedacito De Mí
Millones Mejor que Tú"	1988	–	–	Lucerito
Vete con ella"	1988	7	–	Lucerito
Tu amiga fiel"	1988	–	–	Lucerito
Telefonómana"	1988	–	–	Lucerito
No me hablen de él"	1988	5	–	Lucerito
Madre"	1989	–	–	Cuéntame
Cuéntame"	1989	2	–	Cuéntame
Corazón a la deriva"	1989	8	–	Cuéntame
Tanto"	1990	–	–	Cuéntame
Caso perdido"	1990	–	–	Cuéntame
Fíjate...Fíjate"	1990	–	–	Con Mi Sentimiento
Mi fantasía"	1990	–	–	Con Mi Sentimiento
Te tuve y te perdí!	1990	12	–	Con Mi Sentimiento
Cuando llega el Amor"	1990	–	–	Cuando llega el Amor
Electricidad"	1991	5	–	Sólo Pienso En Tí
Ya no"	1991	7	–	Sólo Pienso En Tí
Amor secreto"	1991	–	–	Sólo Pienso En Tí
Tu desdén"	1991	–	–	Sólo Pienso En Tí
Autocontrol"	1992	–	–	Sólo Pienso En Tí
Llorar"	1992	29	–	Lucero De México
Que no quede huella"	1992	–	–	Lucero De México
Tristes Recuerdos"	1992	–	–	Lucero De México
Veleta"	1993	2	–	Lucero
Sobreviviré"	1993	8	–	Lucero
El número uno"	1993	22	–	Lucero
Los parientes pobres"	1993	–	–	Lucero
Si no podemos amarnos"	1993	–	–	Lucero
Cerca de ti"	1994	23	–	Lucero
Te acordarás de mí"	1994	–	–	Cariño De Mis Cariños
Me estás quemando"	1994	22	–	Cariño De Mis Cariños
Y volveré"	1994	–	–	Cariño De Mis Cariños
Qué te ganaste"	1994	–	–	Cariño De Mis Cariños
Cariño"	1994	–	–	Cariño De Mis Cariños
Palabras"	1994	–	–	Siempre Contigo
Siempre contigo"	1994	4	1	Siempre Contigo
Como perro al sol"	1995	–	–	Siempre Contigo
¿Quién soy yo?"	1995	24	12	Siempre Contigo
Volvamos a empezar"	1995	–	–	Siempre Contigo
Lazos de Amor"	1996	40	–	Lazos de Amor
Tácticas de guerra"	1997	13	2	Piel de Ángel
Quiero"	1997	–	–	Piel de Ángel
Toda la noche"	1997	–	–	Piel de Ángel
Piel de angel"	1997	–	–	Piel de Ángel
Una vez más"	1997	–	–	Piel de Ángel
Corazón lastimado"	1998	32	–	Cerca de Ti
A partir de hoy"	1998	–	–	Cerca de Ti
Desviste mi boca"	1998	–	–	Cerca de Ti
Te amaré toda la vida"	1998	–	–	Cerca de Ti
Quiero" (Live)	1999	–	–	Un Lucero En La México
Popurrí Juan Gabriel" (Live)	1999	–	–	Un Lucero En La México
Mi destino eres tú"	2000	–	–	Mi Destino
No puedo más"	2000	–	–	Mi Destino
Nadie me quiere como tú"	2000	–	–	Mi Destino
Cada latido"	2000	–	–	Mi Destino
Que Alguien Me Diga"	2002	–	–	Un Nuevo Amor
Como te voy a olvidar"	2002	–	–	Un Nuevo Amor
Vete por donde llegaste"	2004	–	–	Cuando Sale Un Lucero
Entre la espada y la pared"	2004	–	–	Cuando Sale Un Lucero
El cable (Ven papi)"	2004	–	–	Cuando Sale Un Lucero
La única que te entiende"	2006	–	–	Quiereme Tal Como Soy
O tú o nada"	2006	–	–	Quiereme Tal Como Soy
Que pasará mañana"	2006	–	–	Quiereme Tal Como Soy
Tú eres mi refugio"	2006	–	–	Quiereme Tal Como Soy
Dueña de tu amor"	2010	–	–	Indispensable
Indispensable"	2010	–	–	Indispensable
Esta Vez la Primera Soy Yo"	2011	–	–	Indispensable
Eres Todo"	2011	–	–	Indispensable
Daño Irreparable"	2011	–	–	Indispensable
Caminar Contigo" (com Joan Sebastian)	2012	–	18	Un Lu*Jo
No Pudiste Amar Así"	2013	–	–	En Concierto
No Entiendo"	2014	–	–	Aquí Estoy
Ay Amor"	2014	–	–	Aquí Estoy
Hasta que Amanezca"	2017	–	–	Enamorada con Banda
"Me Gusta Estar Contigo"	2017	–	–	Enamorada con Banda
"¿Por Qué Te Vas?"	2017	–	–	Enamorada con Banda
"Me Gustas Mucho"	2017	–	–	Enamorada con Banda
"Si Quieres Verme Llorar"	2017	–	–	Enamorada con Banda
"Necesitaría"	2018	–	–	Más Enamorada con Banda
Ven Devórame Otra Vez"	2018	–	–	Más Enamorada con Banda
Aquella Noche"	2018	–	–	Más Enamorada con Banda
Un Corazón Enamorado"	2018	–	–	Más Enamorada con Banda
Viva México"	2018	–	–	—N/a
Electricidad (live)"	2018	–	–	Enamorada en Vivo
A Pesar de Todo (live)"	2018	–	–	Enamorada en Vivo
"Llorar (live)"	2018	–	–	Enamorada en Vivo
"Eu Tô de Olho (live)"	2019	–	–	Brasileira en Vivo
Dona Desse Amor (live)"	2019	–	–	Brasileira en Vivo
Me Deshice de tu Amor"	2019	–	–	Solo Me Faltabas Tú

=== As featured artist ===
Title	Year	Chart Positions			Album
Title	Year	US Hot Latin	US Latin Airplay	US Trop. Air.	Album
Todo el amor del mundo" (w/ Luis Miguel)	1986	9	–	–	Fiebre de Amor
4 Veces Amor" (w/ Mijares)	1996	–	5	–	El Encuentro
Tú eres mi destino" (w/ Paul Anka)	1997	–	–	–	Amigos
El Privilegio de Amar" (Mijares feat. Lucero)	1998	6	4	11	El Privilegio de Amar
Lo siento" (w/ Huey Dunbar)	2002	–	–	10	Yo sí me enamoré
Eterno es este amor" (w/ Yanni)	2009	–	–	–	Voces
Somos el Mundo" (w/ Artists for Haiti)	2010	–	–	–	Somos El Mundo (Single)
Golondrinas viajeras" (w/ Joan Sebastian)	2010	–	–	–	Huevos Rancheros
Llueve el Amor" (Tito El Bambino feat. Lucero)	2011	5	3	–	El Patrón: Invencible
"Luz" (w/ Artists)	2016	–	–	–	México se Pinta de Luz
"No Me Conoces Aún" (w/ Grupo Palomo)	2018	–	–	–	—N/a
"Como Tú" (w/ Luciano Pereyra)	2019	–	–	–	—N/a

== DVDs ==
This list also includes all the releases where she appears, this covers VHS and DVD versions. The list does not contain the DVDs from telenovelas or films, just music.

Year	Title	Videos
1990	Chicas de los 90's (Various)	Cuéntame; Tanto; Vete con ella Corazón a la deriva(Live); Millones mejor que tú
1991	Lucero:La Novia de América	1. Cuéntame (Live); 2. Necesito tu Amor; 3. Autocontrol; 4. Quien pudiera quererte 5. Ya no 6. Tu desdén 7. Solo pienso en ti 8. Nada como ser Miss; 9. Electricidad
1992	Lucero de México: Recital con Mariachi	1. Me estoy volviendo loca(Live); 2. Verdad que duele(Live); 3. Tu infame engaño(Video); 4. Contigo o sin ti(Video); 5. Tu presa fácil(Live); 6.Como duele(Video); 7. Corazón duro(Video); 8. Tristes Recuerdos(Live); 9. Que no quede huella(Live); 10. Pétalo y espinas(Video); 11. Como fui an enamorarme de ti(Video); 12. Llorar(Live)
1993	Siempre Natural: Veleta(Live)	1. Amor de segunda mano 2. El número uno 3. Amor secreto 4. Sobreviviré; 5. Ya no 6. Chico rico 7. Una más 8. Veleta; 9. Electricidad
1994	Lo Mejor de Cristian y Lucero	1. No podrás(Cristian); 2. Electricidad(Lucero); 3. Nunca voy an olvidarte(Cristian); 4. Me estás quemando(Lucero); 5. Para ti(Cristian); 6. Ya no(Lucero); 7. Agua nueva(Cristian); 8. Y volveré(Lucero)
1999	Duro y Contra Ellos; Various(2 CDs + DVD)	CD : No me hablen de él Vete con ella Millones mejor que tú Como perro al sol Pelele; Veleta; DVD : Vete con ella Ya no Palabras
2002	BandaMax, Puros Éxitos... Las más Populares; Various(CD + VCD)	CD : Cómo te voy an olvidar VCD : Cómo te voy an olvidar
2003	Lucero: En Cocierto con Orquesta(Live)	1. Historias de amores 2. Toda la noche 3. Siempre contigo 4. Ya no 5. Quiero; 6. Lazos de amor 7. Electricidad; 8. Cuéntame; 9. Sobreviviré; 10. Si me extrañas 11. Piel de ángel 12. Veleta
2004	Regional Mexicano; Various(Live)	Carta a Ufemia; Cómo te voy an olvidar Que alguien me diga Popurrí Juan Gabriel
2004	Trayectoria (CD + DVD); 1st Edition	CD : 1. Cuando Llega el amor 2. Veleta; 3. Ocho quince 4. Millones mejor que tú 5. Tu amiga fiel 6. Vete con ella 7. Telefonómana; 8. No me hablen de él 9. Tanto; 10. Cuéntame; 11. Corazón a la deriva 12. Madre; 13. Ya no 14. Electricidad; 15. Tu desdén 16. Palabras; 17. Siempre contigo 18. Toda la noche 19. Quiero; 20. Tácticas de guerra DVD : 1. Palabras; 2. Vete con ella 3. Electricidad; 4. Tácticas de guerra 5. Toda la noche 6. Cuéntame; 7. Ya no
2004	Legado Musical:Trayectoria (CD + DVD); 2nd Edition	CD : 1. Ocho quince 2. Telefonómana: 3. Tu amiga fiel 4. Millones mejor que tú 5. Vete con ella 6. No me hablen de él 7. Corazón a la deriva 8. Cuéntame; 9. Ya no 10. Tu desdén 11. Tanto; 12. Cuando llega el amor 13. Electricidad; 14. El número uno 15. Veleta; 16. Si no podemos amarnos 17. Sobreviviré; 18. Los parientes pobres 19. Palabras; 20. Toda la noche 21. Tácticas de guerra 22. Quiero; 23. Siempre; Contigo; DVD : 1. Cuéntame (Non-Official Video); 2. Tanto (Non-Official Video); 3. Interview(with Chabeli Iglesias)
2004	Timbiriche: Trayectoria (Vol. 1)	Chispita (Duet Timbiriche & Lucerito)
2007	Navidad con Amigos	Paseo en Trineo

== Special appearances ==
Album details	Year	Album Chart positions		Song	Artist	Certifications
Album details	Year	US Latin	MEX	Song	Artist	Certifications
Nueva Navidad: Released: 1989; Label: Musart	1989	—	—	Esperemos El Año Nuevo	Lucero	
Juntos Ayer y Hoy: Released: 1990; Label: Melody (#KMED 9017)	1990	—	—	Así	Lucero	
El Estudio de Lara: Released: 1990; Label: Discos America	1990	—	—	Arráncame la vida	Lucero	
El Nuevo Sol: Released: 1995; Label: Producciones Fonográficas (#CDNS 1949)	1995	—	—	Vamos a Empezar de Nuevo; Todos y Nadie	Lucero	
El Encuentro: Released: 1995; Label: EMI (#36313)	1995	—	—	Cuatro Veces Amor	Duet w/Mijares	
Boleros:Por amor y desamor: Released: 1995; Label: Fonovisa (#SDCD 6037)	1995	—	—	La Duda	Lucero	
Querido Amigo: Released: 1996; Label: Fonovisa (#SDCD 6037)	1996	—	—	Amorcito Corazón	Mijares & Pedro Infante (A very brief line sung by Lucero)	
Amigos: Released: 1997; Label: Sony (#CK 91110)	1997	—	—	Tú Eres Mi Destino	Duet w/Paul Anka	
Y Sigue Siendo el Rey: Released: 1997; Label: Sony (#RIN 28976)	1997	39	—	Si nos dejan	Duet w/José Alfredo Jiménez	
El Privilegio de Amar: Released: 1998; Label: Rodven (#559 202-2(24))	1998	—	1	El privilegio de amar	Mijares feat. Lucero	MEX: Platinum
Mulán: Released: 1998; Label: Walt Disney (#060 713-2)	1998	—	—	Reflejo	Lucero	
Duetos: Released: 2000; Label: WEA Latina (#55002)	2000	—	—	No existen límites	Duet w/Armando Manzanero	
En Vivo: Released: 2001; Label: Universal (#016 587-2)	2001	—	—	El privilegio de amar (Live)	Mijares feat. Lucero	
Yo Sí Me Enamoré: Released: 2002; Label: Columbia (#502385 2)	2002	12	—	Lo siento Ballad and Salsa Version	Huey Dunbar feat. Lucero	US: Platinum
Gabriel Navarro: Released: 2002; Label: Universal (#017999)	2002	—	—	Vivir lo nuestro	Duet w/Gabriel Navarro	
Selena ¡VIVE!: Released: 2005; Label: EMI (#77340)	2002	—	—	El chico del apartamento 512	Lucero	
Zapata: Released: 2004; Label: Sony (#93411)	2004	—	—	Quédate en mí	Lucero	
A Feia mais bela: Released: 2006; Label: EMI (#1266616)	2006	—	—	Laços de amor	Lucero	
Navidad con Amigos: Released: 2006; Label: EMI (#83700)	2006	—	—	Paseo en trineo	Lucero	
Homenaje a Pedro Infante; 50 Aniversario: Released: 2006; Label: EMI (#90114)	2006	—	—	Cien Años	Lucero	
Guadalupe: Released: 2006; Label: EMI (#84127)	2006	—	—	Lupita	Lucero	
Voces: Released: 2009; Label: Sony BMG (#747213)	2009	—	—	Eterno es este amor	Yanni & Lucero	
Somos El Mundo 25 Por Haiti: Released: 2010; Label: Universal	2010	—	—	Somos el Mundo	Artists for Haiti	
Mexicanísimo: Released: 2010; Label: Vene Music (#096)	2010	15	21	Mi Ciudad	Yanni & Lucero	
Huevos Rancheros: Released: 2011; Label: Fonovisa (#54639)	2011	3	8	Golondrinas Viajeras	Duet w/Joan Sebastian	
Invencible: Released: 2011; Label: Siente Music (#55070)	2011	4	21	Llueve el Amor	Tito El Bambino feat. Lucero	
"—" denotes releases that did not chart or was not released
