= List of Billboard Latin Rhythm Airplay number ones of 2011 =

Latin Rhythm Airplay is a chart published by Billboard magazine. Since its inception in 2005, the Latin Rhythm Airplay chart ranked the most-played songs on Latin rhythm radio stations. With the issue dated January 8, 2011, the chart's methodology was change to reflect overall airplay of Latin rhythm music on Latin radio stations. Instead of ranking songs being played on Latin-rhythm stations, rankings are determined by the amount of airplay Latin rhythm songs receive on stations that play Latin music regardless of genre.

== Chart history ==
Key
†	Indicates number 1 on Billboard's year-end Latin rhythm chart

Issue date	Song	Artist	Ref
January 1	"Danza Kuduro" †	Don Omar and Lucenzo	
January 8	"Danza Kuduro" †	Don Omar and Lucenzo	
January 15	"Danza Kuduro" †	Don Omar and Lucenzo	
January 22	"Danza Kuduro" †	Don Omar and Lucenzo	
January 29	"Danza Kuduro" †	Don Omar and Lucenzo	
February 5	"Danza Kuduro" †	Don Omar and Lucenzo	
February 12	"Danza Kuduro" †	Don Omar and Lucenzo	
February 19	"Danza Kuduro" †	Don Omar and Lucenzo	
February 26	"Danza Kuduro" †	Don Omar and Lucenzo	
March 5	"Danza Kuduro" †	Don Omar and Lucenzo	
March 12	"Danza Kuduro" †	Don Omar and Lucenzo	
March 19	"Danza Kuduro" †	Don Omar and Lucenzo	
March 26	"Llueve el Amor"	Tito el Bambino	
April 2	"Danza Kuduro" †	Don Omar and Lucenzo	
April 9	"Danza Kuduro" †	Don Omar and Lucenzo	
April 16	"Danza Kuduro" †	Don Omar and Lucenzo	
April 23	"Danza Kuduro" †	Don Omar and Lucenzo	
April 30	"Danza Kuduro" †	Don Omar and Lucenzo	
May 7	"Danza Kuduro" †	Don Omar and Lucenzo	
May 14	"Danza Kuduro" †	Don Omar and Lucenzo	
May 21	"Danza Kuduro" †	Don Omar and Lucenzo	
May 28	"Danza Kuduro" †	Don Omar and Lucenzo	
June 4	"Danza Kuduro" †	Don Omar and Lucenzo	
June 11	"Contestame el Teléfono"	Alexis & Fido featuring Flex	
June 18	"Taboo"	Don Omar	
June 25	"Taboo"	Don Omar	
July 2	"Taboo"	Don Omar	
July 9	"Taboo"	Don Omar	
July 16	"Taboo"	Don Omar	
July 23	"Taboo"	Don Omar	
July 30	"Taboo"	Don Omar	
August 6	"Taboo"	Don Omar	
August 13	"Taboo"	Don Omar	
August 20	"Taboo"	Don Omar	
August 27	"Taboo"	Don Omar	
September 3	"Taboo"	Don Omar	
September 10	"Taboo"	Don Omar	
September 17	"Taboo"	Don Omar	
September 24	"Taboo"	Don Omar	
October 1	"Taboo"	Don Omar	
October 8	"Tu Olor"	Wisin & Yandel	
October 15	"Taboo"	Don Omar	
October 22	"Taboo"	Don Omar	
October 29	"Taboo"	Don Omar	
November 5	"Taboo"	Don Omar	
November 12	"Taboo"	Don Omar	
November 19	"Taboo"	Don Omar	
November 26	"Máquina del Tiempo"	Tito el Bambino featuring Wisin & Yandel	
December 3	"Máquina del Tiempo"	Tito el Bambino featuring Wisin & Yandel	
December 10	"Lovumba"	Daddy Yankee	
December 17	"Máquina del Tiempo"	Tito el Bambino featuring Wisin & Yandel	
December 24	"Lovumba"	Daddy Yankee	
December 31	"Lovumba"	Daddy Yankee	
