= Cazador =

Cazador (Spanish: hunter m., m-pl. cazadores, f. cazadora, f-pl. cazadoras), El Cazador, La Cazadora, Los Cazadores, Las Cazadoras, or variation, may refer to:

== Places ==
- Cazador, San Luis, Argentina
- El Cazadore Museum, Grand Bay, Alabama, USA

== People ==
- Juan Cazador (1899–1956), a Spanish poet and part of the Generation of '27
- Diana La Cazadora (born 1978), Mexican wrestler
- Juan el Cazador (14th century), a famed resident of Mequinenza, Zaragoza, Aragon, Spain
- John I of Aragon (1350–1396), King of Aragon, nicknamed "El Cazador"
- Charles IV of Spain (1748–1819) King of Spain, nicknamed "El Cazador" due to his love of hunting
- Beatriz de Bobadilla y Ossorio (1462–1501), a monarch in the Canary Islands, nicknamed "La Cazadora" for headhunting men of high nobility

== Fictional characters ==
- Diana la Cazadora, the titular character from the 1915 play Diana Cazadora by the Quintero brothers
- Cazador Szarr, a vampire featured in the video game Baldur's Gate 3

== Arts and entertainment ==
- El Cazador (film), 2020 film by Argentine director Marco Berger
- Los Cazadores (play), a 1967 play by Paco Ignacio Taibo I
- El Cazador (exhibition), a photographic exhibition of Alvaro Laiz works at the Fundación Cerezales Antonino y Cinia
- Cazadors, flying buglike creatures from the 2010 video game Fallout: New Vegas

=== Literature ===
- Cazador (comics) an Argentine Spanish-language comic book
- El Cazador (comics), a short-lived U.S. English-language comic book series
- El Cazador (novel; aka El Cazador de Leones), a 1967 Spanish-language novella by Javier Tomeo
- El Cazador (story), a 1999 Spanish-language short story by Clara Obligado
- El Cazador (story), a 2000 English-language horror short story by Lisa Morton

=== Music ===
==== Albums ====
- Los Cazadores: Primera Busqueda (album), a 2005 reggaeton compilation album
- El Cazador (album), a 1999 album by Bobby Pulido

==== Songs ====
- "El Cazador" (song), a 2019 song by Natanael Cano off the album Corridos Tumbados
- "Cazadora" (song), a 2014 song by Alexis & Fido off the album La Esencia
- "La Cazadora" (song), a 2005 song by Tito El Bambino from the album Los Cazadores: Primera Busqueda; see Tito El Bambino discography
- "Cazadora" (song), a 2005 song by Calle Ciega off the album Una Vez Más (Calle Ciega album)

=== Television ===
- El Cazador de la Bruja (TV series; aka El Cazador), an anime television series
- El cazador (TV series), the Spanish adaptation of British game show The Chase
- "El Cazador" (episode), a 2019 TV episode of Decisiones: Unos ganan, otros pierden

== Ships ==
- Chilean ship Cazador, whose sinking in 1856 caused the biggest single-incident maritime losses of life in the history of Chile
- El Cazador (ship), a 1784 Spanish shipwreck
- Cazadora (1981), a Descubierta-class corvette commissioned into the Spanish Navy in 1981, and has used pennant numbers F35 and P78
- La Cazadora (1779), a corvette built at Ferro; see List of ships built at Ferrol shipyards 1750–1881

=== Fictional ships ===
- El Cazadora, a fictional playing ship from the game Pirates Constructible Strategy Game

== Other uses ==
- Caçadores, type of Portuguese light infantry
- Brigada Acorazada Nº 2 "Cazadores", an army brigade of Chile; see Structure of the Chilean Army
- "Cazadores", a brand of tequila from Bacardi

== See also ==
- Caçador (disambiguation)
