= List of Billboard Latin Rhythm Albums number ones of 2012 =

The Latin Rhythm Albums chart is a music chart published in Billboard magazine. The data is compiled by Nielsen SoundScan from a sample that includes music stores, music departments at electronics and department stores, internet sales (both physical and digital) and verifiable sales from concert venues in the United States. The chart is composed of studio, live, and compilation releases by Latin artists performing in the Latin hip hop, urban, dance and reggaeton, the most popular Latin Rhythm music genres.

== Albums ==
Chart date	Album	Artist(s)	Reference
January 7	Invencible	Tito "El Bambino"	
January 14	Don Omar Presents: Meet the Orphans	Don Omar	
January 21	Don Omar Presents: Meet the Orphans	Don Omar	
January 28	Don Omar Presents: Meet the Orphans	Don Omar	
February 4	Don Omar Presents: Meet the Orphans	Don Omar	
February 11	Don Omar Presents: Meet the Orphans	Don Omar	
February 18	Don Omar Presents: Meet the Orphans	Don Omar	
February 25	Don Omar Presents: Meet the Orphans	Don Omar	
March 3	Invencible	Tito "El Bambino"	
March 10	Don Omar Presents: Meet The Orphans	Don Omar	
March 17	Don Omar Presents: Meet The Orphans	Don Omar	
March 24	Don Omar Presents: Meet The Orphans	Don Omar	
March 31	Don Omar Presents: Meet The Orphans	Don Omar	
April 7	Don Omar Presents: Meet The Orphans	Don Omar	
April 14	Don Omar Presents: Meet The Orphans	Don Omar	
April 21	Don Omar Presents: Meet The Orphans	Don Omar	
April 28	Don Omar Presents: Meet The Orphans	Don Omar	
May 5	Don Omar Presents: Meet The Orphans	Don Omar	
May 12	Don Omar Presents: Meet The Orphans	Don Omar	
May 19	Don Omar Presents MTO²: New Generation	Don Omar	
May 26	Don Omar Presents MTO²: New Generation	Don Omar	
June 2	Don Omar Presents MTO²: New Generation	Don Omar	
June 9	Don Omar Presents MTO²: New Generation	Don Omar	
June 16	Don Omar Presents MTO²: New Generation	Don Omar	
June 23	Don Omar Presents MTO²: New Generation	Don Omar	
June 30	Don Omar Presents MTO²: New Generation	Don Omar	
July 7	Don Omar Presents MTO²: New Generation	Don Omar	
July 14	Don Omar Presents MTO²: New Generation	Don Omar	
July 21	Líderes	Wisin & Yandel	
July 28	Líderes	Wisin & Yandel	
August 4	Líderes	Wisin & Yandel	
August 11	Líderes	Wisin & Yandel	
August 18	Líderes	Wisin & Yandel	
August 25	Líderes	Wisin & Yandel	
September 1	Líderes	Wisin & Yandel	
September 8	Pina Records Presenta: La Formula: The Company	Various Artists	
September 15	Pina Records Presenta: La Formula: The Company	Various Artists	
September 22	Pina Records Presenta: La Formula: The Company	Various Artists	
September 29	Prestige	Daddy Yankee	
October 6	Prestige	Daddy Yankee	
October 13	Prestige	Daddy Yankee	
October 20	Prestige	Daddy Yankee	
October 27	Prestige	Daddy Yankee	
November 3	Prestige	Daddy Yankee	
November 10	Líderes	Wisin & Yandel	
November 17	Líderes	Wisin & Yandel	
November 24	Líderes	Wisin & Yandel	
December 1	Líderes	Wisin & Yandel	
December 8	Líderes	Wisin & Yandel	
December 15	Líderes	Wisin & Yandel	
December 22	Líderes	Wisin & Yandel	
December 29	Líderes	Wisin & Yandel	
