= Las Numero Uno =

Greatest hits album by Banda El Recodo
- Released: September 7, 2010
- Genre: Banda
- Label: Fonovisa

Banda El Recodo chronology
| Me Gusta Todo de Ti (2009) | Las Numero Uno (2010) | La Mejor de Todas (2011) |

Las Numero Uno (English: The Number Ones) is a compilation album by Banda El Recodo. The album contains the singles "Me Gusta Todo De Ti" and "Te Pido Perdón (Banda Version)". There are also many other singles from the band.

== Standard edition track listing ==
1. Me Gusta Todo De Ti - 3:03
2. Te Presumo — 3:11
3. Que Bonito — 2:48
4. La Gran Panchanga — 2:51
5. Dos Botellas de Mezcal — 3:16
6. Techno Cumbia — 2:48
7. Para Toda La Vida — 3:27
8. Delante de Mi Deténte — 2:33
9. Deja — 2:37
10. Lo Mejor de Mi Vida — 3:57
11. Tus Palabras — 2:59
12. No Me Sé Rajar — 2:53
13. Y Llegaste Tú — 3:29
14. Te Pido Perdón (Banda Version) (with Tito "El Bambino") — 2:52
15. Yo Se Que Te Acordarás — 3:18
