= Dime Que Me Quieres =

Single by Banda el Recodo

from the album Me Gusta Todo de Ti
- Released: 2009
- Recorded: 2009
- Genre: Banda cumbia
- Length: 3:10
- Label: Fonovisa LGA Entertainment
- Songwriter(s): Luna, Romero

Banda el Recodo singles chronology
"Te Pido Perdón (Banda version)" (2010)	"Dime Que Me Quieres" (2009)	""Llueve el Amor (Banda Version)" (2010)

"Dime Que Me Quieres" (English: Tell Me That You Love Me) is the second single from the album Me Gusta Todo de Ti by Banda El Recodo.

== Music video ==
The music video starts by showing a woman in a bikini. Then the main singer of the band applies for a job as a pool boy. He also writes a letter to the woman in the bikini. The band is also playing in a different part of the house. The singer is a waiter at a restaurant where he is well known. He is shown walking and singing in an alley. The other pool boy gives her the letter written by the singer. As the woman reads the letter written for her, she looks displeased and worried. There is another man that wants the woman and the father approves of this. The singer is seen walking to the woman's house but is disappointed to see the woman with the other man. He leaves and walks down the same alley, where he was before, when a car pulls up and friends greet him and he gets in. The song ends, but shows that it is to be continued.

Tito El Bambino has a cameo in this music video and is also a friend to the singer.

== Charts ==
=== Weekly charts ===
Chart (2009–2010)	Peak position
US Bubbling Under Hot 100 Singles (Billboard)	14
US Hot Latin Songs (Billboard)	2
US Regional Mexican Airplay (Billboard)	1

=== Year-end charts ===
Chart (2010)	Position
US Hot Latin Songs (Billboard)	4

=== Decade-end charts ===
Chart (2010–2019)	Position
US Hot Latin Songs (Billboard)	50
