= Flow Natural =

Single by Tito "El Bambino" featuring Beenie Man and Ines

from the album Top of the Line
- Released: 2006
- Recorded: 2006
- Genre: Reggaeton
- Length: 2:53
- Songwriter(s): Anthony Moses Davis; Efraín Fines Nevares; Francisco Saldaña
- Producer(s): Tainy; Luny Tunes; Nales

Tito "El Bambino" singles chronology
"Caile" (2006)	"Flow Natural" (2006)	"Mía" (2006)

Beenie Man singles chronology
"Girls" (2006)	"Flow Natural" (2006)	"I'm Drinking / Rum & Red Bull" (2010)

Music video
- "Flow Natural" on YouTube

"Flow Natural" is a song by Puerto Rican reggaeton singer Tito El Bambino, Dominican Republic singer Deevani (credited as Ines), and Jamaican reggae recording artist Beenie Man. It was released in 2006 as the second single from Tito El Bambino's debut solo album Top of the Line. The song was written by Beenie Man, Tito El Bambino, and Francisco Saldaña; it was produced by Tainy, Luny Tunes, and Nales. Its chorus samples "Chhadh Gayi Chhadh Gayi", a song from the 2002 Indian film Chor Machaaye Shor.

In the U.S., the song peaked at number 16 on the Hot Latin Songs chart in 2006.

== Chart performance ==
The song entered the Billboard Hot Latin Songs chart at number 40 on August 5, 2006. "Flow Natural" peaked at number 16 on the chart in September 2006.

== Charts ==
Chart (2006)	Peak position
U.S. Billboard Hot Latin Songs	16
