= Tanto =

Tanto may refer to:

== Places ==
- Tanto, Stockholm, district of Stockholm, Sweden
- Tantō, Hyōgo, Japan

== Music ==
- Tanto (Pablo Alborán album), 2012
  - "Tanto (song)", title track
- Tanto (Patty Pravo album), 1976
- "Tanto", a 1990 song by Lucero
- "Tanto", a 2019 song by Jesse & Joy featuring Luis Fonsi

== Others ==
- Tantō, a Japanese combat knife
- Tanto, a type of tactical knife tip style or knives with said tip style.
- Daihatsu Tanto, a concept car based on the Daihatsu Move kei car
- Kris Paronto (born 1971), known as Tanto

== See also ==
- Tonto, a character in the Lone Ranger universe
