= Trebol Clan Es Trebol Clan =

Studio album by Trebol Clan
- Released: August 31, 2010
- Genre: Reggaeton
- Label: Blow Music Factory; Brutal Noise
- Producer: Dr. Joe; Mr. Frank; DJ Urba & Rome; Yampi; Noriega; Alzule; Bryan La Mente Del Equipo; Aneudy; ALX; Marcos G Yomi

Trebol Clan chronology
The Producers (2009)	Trebol Clan Es Trebol Clan (2010)	Yo Soy Trébol: El Artista (2015)

Trebol Clan Es Trebol Clan is the second studio album by Trebol Clan. It was released on August 31, 2010. This was the first album made without Berto El Original. And the first one with only one singer

== Track listing ==
1. Intro (Feat. Wibal & Alex, J Alvarez, Tony Lenta, Mac. Dize, Gaona, Jomar & Jessikita)
2. Santero
3. Lo Tuyo y Lo Mío
4. Agárrala II
5. Ando Guerreando (Remix) (Feat. Gaona & Arcángel)
6. Pa Los Moteles (Feat. J Álvarez)
7. La Noche Está Buena
8. Llora
9. Yo Quiero Tenerte (Feat. Ñengo Flow)
10. Tú La Tocaste (Feat. Mac. Dize)
11. Si La Ves
12. Sin Ropa (Remix) (Feat. Dyland & Lenny, MJ & Punto Cero)
13. Open Bar (Feat. Farruko)
14. Amor De Escuela (Feat. Tony Lenta)
15. El Viaje (Feat. Wibal & Alex)
16. Sálvame
17. Esto Es Un Perreo (Feat. Sosa & Ñengo Flow)
18. ¡Qué Mal Te Va! (Feat. Galante)
19. Rampanpan
20. Ando Guerreando (Feat. Gaona)
21. Que La Noche Decida (Mac. Dize)
22. Mami (Master Joe Feat. Dr. Joe)
23. Libera El Estrés (Mac. Dize Feat. Ñengo Flow)
24. Estamos De Cacería (Feat. Mac. Dize)
25. La Noche Está Buena (Club Version)
26. Hoy Me Voy a To'as (Feat. Jay Pee & Mac. Dize)
