= Corazón Salvaje (album) =

Compilation album by Mijares
- Released: March 22, 1994 (Mexico)
- Recorded: 1993–94
- Genre: Pop
- Label: EMI International
- Producer: José Ramón Florez

Mijares Compilations chronology
Mis Mejores Canciones:17 Super Éxitos (1992)	Corazón Salvaje (1994)	Antología (2002)

Corazón Salvaje (English Wild Heart) is the 2nd compilation album by Mexican pop singer Mijares. Sometimes it's considered as a normal studio album, but this is a misconception because it has the song "Corazón Salvaje"; that is the only new song and the rest are Mijares' greatest hits.

== Track listing ==
Tracks:

1. Corazón Salvaje
2. Encadenado
3. Maria Bonita
4. No Se Murió el Amor
5. Para Amarnos Más
6. Uno Entre Mil
7. No Hace Falta
8. Ahora Se Me Va
9. Ansiedad
10. Soldado del Amor
11. Que Puedo Hacer Yo
12. Con Tanto Amor
13. Piel Canela

== Singles ==
- Corazón Salvaje

=== Single charts ===
#	Title	MEX	U.S. Hot Lat.	ARG	CRI	CHL	COL	PRY	URY	NIC	GTM	VEN	BOL	PAN	ECU
1.	"Corazón Salvaje"	#1	#8	#1	#1	#1	#1	#1	#1	#1	#1	#1	#1	#1	#1

=== Album chart ===
This album reached the 15th position in Billboard Latin Pop Albums.
