= Nuda Libertà =

Studio album by Mijares
- Released: 1990
- Recorded: 1990
- Genre: Pop

Mijares chronology
Un Hombre Discreto (1989)	Nuda Libertà (1990)	Que Nada Nos Separe (1991)

Nuda libertà (English: Naked freedom) is the fifth studio album by Mexican pop singer Mijares. This album was released in 1990.

== History ==
A rarest album of Mijares, it was recorded totally in Italian, in Rome at the "Easy Records Italiana" studios (Studio Quattro Uno), by Michel ANDINA . The original edition was entitled "Nuda libertà" and after that it was named "Collezione Privata" (Private Collection). This album was a result of his participation in San Remo Festival with the Spanish song "La nevada" (The snowfall) and this same song was performed in Italian by Mia Martini. It includes 7 unpublished songs.

== Track listing ==
Tracks:

1. Nuda
2. Io'ci Credo Nelle Stelle
3. Al Margini del Sole
4. La Mia Chitarra E'donna
5. Bella Liberta
6. Mal d'Amore
7. Piu'sto Giu'e Piu'sto Su
8. Cuori Solitari
9. La Nevada
