= Historias de un Amor =

Studio album by Mijares
- Released: 19 September 2000
- Recorded: 2000
- Genre: Pop
- Label: Mercury Records; Universal Music Group
- Producer: Danilo Ballo; Emanuele Ruffinengo

Mijares chronology
El Privilegio de Amar (1998)	Historias de un Amor (2000)	En Vivo (2001)

Historias de un Amor (English: Stories of a love) is the 13th studio album by Mexican pop singer Mijares. This album was released on 19 September 2000 and it was produces by Danilo Ballo and Emanuele Ruffinengo. It has songs from songwriters like Alejandro Lerner, Ana Cirré, Zucchero and some Italian songs covered by the same Mijares.

== Track listing ==
Tracks:

1. Aunque No Estés - 4:43
2. Si Me Enamoro
3. Historia de un Amor
4. ¿Por Culpa de Quién?
5. La Belleza
6. Amigas-Amores
7. Dame Una Flor
8. Perdóname
9. Dile Que la Amas
10. Háblame de Ti
11. Cuando Te Hablo de Amor
12. Cuando Me Vaya

=== Singles ===
- Aunque No Estés
- Si me enamoro
- Dame una flor
