= Escápate conmigo =

Escápate Conmigo
- Poster of the movie
- Directed by: René Cardona Jr.
- Produced by: Carlos Amador
- Starring: Lucerito; Manuel Mijares; Jorge Ortiz de Pinedo
- Distributed by: Telecine
- Release date: 1988
- Running time: 102 minutes
- Country: Mexico
- Language: Spanish

Escápate conmigo (in English: Escape With Me) is a Mexican musical and comedy film, released in 1988. Manuel Mijares has confessed that he fell in love with Lucero since they starred in this film, ten years later they got married.

== Synopsis ==
Lucerito (Lucero) is a teenager of 18 who lives in a gloomy castle that belongs to her aunt Raymunda (Ariadna Welter), her tutor and executor, too. Raymunda is very strict and scolds Lucerito as well as making life impossible for her. To top it off Raymunda wants to marry Lucerito to old crone Don Gastón (Alfredo Wally Barrón) forcefully. One day Lucerito watches on TV a contest, where the one to gives the prize of "Queen for A Day" is Manuel (Mijares), an old friend. She decides to sneak out and travels to Mexico City to participate in the contest; on this journey she meets several characters and experiences unexpected adventures.

== Cast ==
- Lucero as Lucerito
- Manuel Mijares as Manuel
- Jorge Ortiz de Pinedo as Sergio
- Pedro Weber 'Chatanuga' as Melolico
- Ariadna Welter as Raymunda
- Alejandro Guce as Augurio Aguado
- Alfredo Wally Barrón as Don Gastón Perales

== Soundtrack ==
This is a special album by Lucero with 5 tracks.

1. Un mundo mejor
2. Refresco para dos
3. Buen día
4. Sueños
5. Corazón aventurero
