= Que Nada Nos Separe =

Studio album by Mijares
- Released: 1991
- Recorded: 1990–91
- Genre: Pop
- Label: Capitol
- Producer: Oscar López

Mijares chronology
Nuda Libertà (1990)	Que Nada Nos Separe (1991)	María Bonita (1992)

Que Nada Nos Separe (English: May Nothing Tear Us Apart) is the sixth studio album by Mexican pop singer Mijares. This album was released in 1991 earning 6 Gold discs.

== History ==
This disc, produced by Omar López, has songs from the songwriters Alejandro Lerner, Alejandro Filio and Marco Flores, among others. Several of his greatest hits are from this album.

== Track listing ==
Tracks:

1. Cuando te hago el amor - 3:35
2. Un amor por llegar - 4:18
3. Que nada nos separe - 4:20
4. Luna llena - 3:52
5. En carne viva - 3:47
6. Buena fortuna - 3:36
7. No hace falta - 4:33
8. Persona a persona - 4:11
9. Bonita - 4:20
10. Me cuesta trabajo - 4:52
11. Desnuda - 4:20

== Singles ==
- Que nada nos separe
- No hace falta
- Persona a persona

=== Single Charts ===
#	Title	Mexico	United States Hot Lat.	Argentina	Costa Rica	Chile	Colombia	Paraguay	Ecuador
1.	"Que nada nos separe"	#1	#5	#6	#4	#3	#9	#2	#2
2.	"No hace falta"	#2	#5	#10	#3	#10	#11	#19	#14
3.	"Persona a persona"	#1	#5	#9	#10	#10	#9	#7	#1

=== Album Charts ===
The album reached the 13th position in Billboard Latin Pop Albums.
