= The Producers (Trebol Clan album) =

Mixtape by Trébol Clan, Dr. Joe & Mr. Frank
- Released: December 1, 2009
- Recorded: 2008/2009
- Genre: Reggaeton
- Labels: Blow Music Factory; Brutal Noise
- Producers: DJ Joe; Mr. Frank

Trébol Clan, Dr. Joe & Mr. Frank chronology
Fantasía Musical (2009)	The Producers (2009)	Trebol Clan Es Trebol Clan (2010)

The Producers is a collaborative album by Trébol Clan, Dr. Joe & Mr. Frank and released in 2009.

== Track listing ==
#	Title	Performer(s)	Length
1	"Intro"	Dr. Joe & Mr. Frank feat. Ñengo Flow	3:02
2	"Desnudate"	Trebol Clan feat. Baby Rasta & Gringo	3:34
3	"Fugá"	Trebol Clan feat. Ñejo & Dálmata, J Alvarez, Tony Lenta, Julio Voltio & Farruko	4:24
4	"Sueltate El Pelo"	Trebol Clan feat. Dr. Joe	3:29
5	"Moviendo Las Nalgas (Remix)"	Trebol Clan feat. Lennox, Baby Rasta, Franco El Gorila & Nino Slow	4:50
6	"Sin Ropa"	Trebol Clan feat. Marwin "Pepito Perez"	3:17
7	"Alejate De Mi"	Jory feat. Marwin "Pepito Perez"	4:28
8	"413"	Trebol Clan feat. Marwin "Pepito Perez"	3:13
9	"No Se Si Estas Sola"	Trebol Clan feat. Tito El Bambino	3:17
10	"No Seas Mala"	Trebol Clan feat. Nova & Jory	3:26
11	"Salvando Mix"	Dr. Joe & Mr. Frank	1:56
12	"Me Hipnotizas (Remix)"	Trebol Clan feat. J-King & Maximan & Guelo Star	3:27
13	"Amor Regresa (Dembow)"	Trebol Clan feat. Marwin "Pepito Perez"	3:44
14	"Matador"	Jory feat. Ñengo Flow	4:08
15	"Perversa"	Trebol Clan feat. Jowell & Randy	4:03
16	"El Primer Beso"	Joel D.I.	2:55
17	"Vamonos A Lo Loco"	Trebol Clan feat. Full Latino	3:24
18	"En La Disco Apreta"	Trebol Clan feat. Shako	3:52
19	"Mamen To"	Trebol Clan feat. Yomo, Guelo Star, Master Joe & Syko	4:35
20	"Bronca"	Master Joe feat. Marwin "Pepito Perez"	3:05
21	"Ronquen (Mix Discotequeo)"	Dr. Joe & Mr. Frank	2:38
22	"Me Hipnotizas (Remix Dancehall)"	Trebol Clan feat. Grupo Mania	3:53
