= Amor y Rock and Roll =

Amor y Rock And Roll

Studio album by Mijares
- Released: 1987
- Recorded: 1987
- Genre: Pop
- Label: EMI
- Producer: Miguel Blasco

Mijares chronology
Soñador (1986)	Amor y Rock And Roll (1987)	Uno Entre Mil (1988)

Amor y Rock And Roll (English: Love and Rock n' Roll) is the second studio album by Mexican pop singer Mijares. This album was released in 1987. Once again Mijares looked for his previous producer Miguel Blasco. He worked again with the songwriters José Ramón Florez, Hernaldo Zúñiga, Gian Pietro Felisatti and besides Pablo Pinilla.

== Track listing ==
=== Lp Album ===
Tracks:

1. No se murió el amor – 3:55
2. Solamente un hombre – 3:23
3. El rey de la noche – 3:20
4. El amor no tiene fronteras – 3:19
5. Baila en los pasillos – 3:03
6. Amor y Rock and Roll – 2:53
7. Mónica – 3:06
8. Un montón de verano – 3:11
9. Corazones rebeldes – 3:20
10. Corredor de fondo – 3:18
11. Poco a poco (Bonus track) – 3:33

=== Bonus Track ===
"Poco a poco" (Little by little) originally belongs to the previous album, but it was taken away and replaced by the song "Soñador" (Dreamer). The producer decided to include it here and release it as a single.

== Singles ==
- No se murió el amor
- El amor no tiene fronteras
- El rey de la noche
- Poco a poco

=== Single Charts ===
#	Title	Mexico	United States Hot Lat.	Argentina	Costa Rica	Chile	Colombia	Venezuela	Puerto Rico
1.	"No se murió el amor"	#1	#4	#1	#1	#1	#1	#1	#1
2.	"El amor no tiene fronteras"	#1	#35	#15	#12	#10	#16	#19	#9
3.	"El rey de la noche"	#1	-	#10	#2	#1	#6	#9	#9
4.	"Poco a poco"	#1	-	#1	#1	#1	#2	#3	#1
