= Caçador (disambiguation) =

Caçador is a municipality in the state of Santa Catarina in the South region of Brazil.

Caçador (plural: Caçadores) may also refer to:

- Caçador Airport, Caçador, Brazil
- Caçadores, historical Portuguese infantry
- Rui Caçador, Portuguese football manager
- Danilo Caçador, Brazilian footballer

== See also ==
- Cazador (disambiguation)
