= María Bonita (album) =

Studio album by Manuel Mijares
- Released: May 19, 1992
- Recorded: 1991–92
- Genre: Pop
- Label: EMI
- Producer: Bebu Silvetti

Manuel Mijares chronology
Que Nada Nos Separe (1991)	María Bonita (1992)	Encadenado (1993)

María bonita (English: Pretty María) is the seventh studio album by Mexican pop singer Manuel Mijares. It was released on May 19, 1992.

== History ==
This album was produced by Bebu Silvetti. It has classic oldies of Agustín Lara, José Alfredo Jiménez, Tomás Méndez, Bobby Capó and Oswaldo Farrés, among others. The idea of this album was born when Mijares was performing to María Félix in a TV show hosted by Verónica Castro.

== Track listing ==
Tracks:

1. María Bonita
2. Ella/ Cuando vivas conmigo/ Que bonito amor
3. Quizá, quizá, quizá
4. La Magaleña
5. Ansiedad
6. Palabras de mujer
7. Noche de ronda
8. Piel canela
9. Mujer
10. La media vuelta/ Retirada/ Amenecí en tus brazos
11. Cucurrucucú paloma

== Singles ==
- María Bonita
- Piel canela
- Quizá, quizá, quizá

=== Single charts ===
#	Title	Mexico	United States Hot Lat.	Argentina	Costa Rica	Chile	Colombia	Paraguay	Uruguay
1.	"María Bonita"	#1	#4	#10	#15	#10	#14	#2	#1
2.	"Piel canela"	#1	#3	#10	#9	#10	#5	#6	#1
3.	"Quizá, quizá, quizá"	#9	#25	#21	#16	#20	#18	#17	#10

=== Album charts ===
The album reached the 5th position in Billboard Latin Pop Albums.
