= Encadenado (album) =

Studio album by Mijares
- Released: March 23, 1993
- Recorded: 1992–93
- Genre: Pop
- Label: EMI
- Producer: Juan Carlos Calderón; Julio Palacios

Mijares chronology
María Bonita (1992)	Encadenado (1993)	Vive en mí (1994)

Encadenado (English: Chained) is the eighth studio album by Mexican pop singer Mijares. This album was released on March 23, 1993. This album was produced by Juan Carlos Calderón and Julio Palacios. It didn't perform very well in the charts nor the singles, and it kept him dormant between the people.

== Track listing ==
Tracks:

1. Volverás
2. Ahora se me va
3. Encadenado
4. No me esperes más
5. Que puedo hacer yo con tanto amor
6. Él
7. Mi amiga soledad
8. Voy a gritar a los cuatro vientos
9. La duda
10. Amanecer en tu cuerpo

== Singles ==
- Encadenado
- Que puedo Hacer yo con Tanto Amor
- Ahora se me va

=== Single charts ===
#	Title	United States Hot Lat.
1.	"Encadenado"	#9 |
2.	"Ahora se me va"	#17|
3.	"Que Puedo Hacer Yo Con Tanto Amor"	#35

=== Album charts ===
The album reached the 5th position in Billboard Latin Pop Albums.
