= Vive en mí =

Studio album by Mijares
- Released: 9 August 1994
- Recorded: 1994
- Genre: Pop
- Label: EMI
- Producer: Oscar López

Mijares chronology
Encadenado (1993)	Vive en mí (1994)	El Encuentro (1995)

Vive en mí (Live in me) is the ninth studio album by the Mexican pop singer Mijares. This album was released on 9 August 1994. It was produced by Oscar López and recorded in New York. The album includes some covers of Italian songs, and some famous songwriters provides his themes like Pablo Milanés, Lolita de la Colina, Renato Mares, Luis Gómez-Escolar and Gerardo Flores.

== Track listing ==
Tracks:

1. "Vive en mí"
2. "La quiero a morir"
3. "Amor"
4. "Como duele"
5. "Para los dos"
6. "Calorías"
7. "Alma fria"
8. "Para vivir"
9. "Llévame"
10. "Amarte a ti"
11. "Conocerte fue un placer"
12. "Lluvia de amor"
13. "Lola"

== Singles ==
- "Vive en mí" #2 México (Music video directed by Daniel Gruener)
- "Amor" #1 México (Music video directed by Daniel Gruener)
- "Como Duele Perder" #5 México (no video)
- "Alma Fría" #10 México

=== Single charts ===
#	Title	Mexico	United States Hot Lat.	El Salvador	Costa Rica	Panama	Guatemala	Bolivia	Nicaragua
1.	"Vive en mí"	#2	#20	#10	#21	#9	#5	#17	#1
2.	"Alma fría"	#10	-	#15	#29	#10	#10	#19	#2

== Sales ==
Region	Certification	Certified units/sales
Mexico	—	100,000
