= Mía (Tito El Bambino song) =

Single by Tito El Bambino

Single by Tito El Bambino featuring Daddy Yankee

from the album Top of the Line
- Released: October 2006
- Recorded: 2005–2006
- Genre: Reggaeton
- Length: 3:51
- Songwriter(s): E. Fines-Nevares; R. Ayala; A. Santos-Perez; J. De la Cruz
- Producer(s): Nely el Arma Secreta

Tito El Bambino singles chronology
"Flow Natural" (2006)	"Mía" (2006)	"Siente El Boom" (2007)

"Mía" (English: "Mine") is the third single by Puerto Rican reggaeton artist Tito El Bambino, from his debut studio album Top of the Line, released in October 2007. It was co-written and produced by Nely el Arma Secreta. It features Daddy Yankee, who also co-wrote the song.

== Chart performance ==
The song proved to be a major success during 2006, peaking at number 12 on the Billboard Hot Latin Songs chart. It even managed to perform well on the Latin Tropical Airplay chart, peaking at number nine.

=== Chart positions ===
Chart (2006)	Peak position
U.S. Billboard Hot Latin Songs	12
U.S. Billboard Latin Rhythm Airplay	5
U.S. Billboard Latin Tropical Airplay	9
