= Latin Classics Mijares =

Greatest hits album by Mijares
- Released: 2003 (Mexico)
- Recorded: 2003
- Genre: Pop
- Label: EMI International

Mijares Compilations chronology
| 30 Éxitos Insuperables (2003) | Latin Classics Mijares (2003) | Yuri y Mijares:Juntos por Primera Vez (2003) |

Latin Classics - Mijares is the sixth compilation album by Mexican pop singer Mijares. It is part of an EMI International series, all with similar artwork featuring compilations of artists included Jon Secada, Los Mismos, Alvaro Torres, Los Alegres de Terán, Mazz, Emilio Navaira, Grupo Modelo, Baron de Apodaca, Jose Luis Perales, Ednita Nazario, Daniela Romo, Barrio Boyzz, Paulina Rubio, Paloma San Basilio, La Tropa F, Pandora (musical group), Los Donneños, Myriam Hernandez, Jose Feliciano, La Mafia, Luis Miguel, Laura Canales and Ram Herrera.

== Track listing ==
Tracks:

1. María bonita
2. No se murió el amor
3. La quiero a morir
4. Para amarnos más
5. Soldado del amor
6. Alfonsina y el mar
7. Que nada nos separe
8. Piel canela
9. Bonita
10. El breve espacio
