= Honor a Quien Honor Merece =

Studio album by Mijares
- Released: September 1, 2005
- Recorded: 2005
- Genre: Latin pop
- Label: Sony International

Mijares chronology
Cappuccino (2004)	Honor a Quien Honor Merece (2005)	Swing en tu Idioma (2007)

Honor a Quien Honor Merece (English 'Honor Whom Honor Deserves) is the 16th studio album by the Mexican pop singer Mijares. This album is a tribute to José José and it was released on September 1, 2005. It has earned a Gold and Platinum disc.

== Track listing ==
1. "El Triste"
2. "Almohada"
3. "Preso"
4. "Si Me Dejas Ahora"
5. "Me Basta"
6. "Desesperado"
7. "El Amar y el Querer"
8. "Gavilán o Paloma"
9. "Volcán"
10. "Una Noche de Amor"
11. "Vamos a Darnos Tiempo"
12. "La Nave del Olvido"

== Sales and certifications ==
Region	Certification	Certified units/sales
Mexico (AMPROFON)	Platinum+Gold	150,000^{^}
^{^} Shipments figures based on certification alone.
