= Un Hombre Discreto =

Studio album by Mijares
- Released: November 21, 1989
- Recorded: 1989
- Genre: Latin pop
- Label: Capitol
- Producer: Oscar López

Mijares chronology
Uno Entre Mil (1988)	Un Hombre Discreto (1989)	Nuda Libertà (1990)

Un Hombre Discreto (English: A discreet man) is the fourth studio album by Mexican pop singer Mijares. This album was released in 1989 earning 7 Gold and 3 Platinum discs.

== History ==
This album marked a very meaningful change in his career. Mijares left his previous producers and began to work with producer Oscar López and Argentinean composer Daniel Freiberg. The album spanned two of his most successful hits: "Baño de mujeres" and the ballad "Para amarnos más".

== Track listing ==
Tracks:

1. No es normal (It is not usual) - 4:20
2. Un hombre discreto (A discreet man) - 4:38
3. Para amarnos más (To love each other more) - 3:28
4. Me acordaré de ti (I will remember you) - 3:34
5. Piel de luna (Moonskin) - 4:18
6. Baño de mujeres (Ladies' restroom) - 3:11
7. Leña seca (Dry wood) - 4:03
8. Fuera de combate (knocked out) - 3:58
9. No busques más (Look no further) - 4:15
10. Alfonsina y el mar (Alfonsina and the sea) - 4:58

== Singles ==
- Para amarnos más
- Baño de mujeres
- Me acordaré de ti

== Charts ==
Chart (1990)	Peak position
US Latin Pop Albums (Billboard)	4

=== Single charts ===
#	Title	Mexico	United States Hot Lat.	Argentina	Costa Rica	Chile	Colombia	Venezuela	Ecuador
1.	"Para amarnos más"	#1	#3	#1	#1	#1	#1	#1	#1
2.	"Baño de mujeres"	#1	-	#5	#4	#1	#1	#3	#1

== Sales and certifications ==
Region	Certification	Certified units/sales
Mexico (AMPROFON)	3× Platinum+7× Gold	1,450,000^{^}
^{^} Shipments figures based on certification alone.
