= Uno Entre Mil =

Studio album by Mijares
- Released: 1988
- Recorded: 1988
- Genre: Pop
- Label: EMI

Mijares chronology
Amor y Rock and Roll (1987)	Uno Entre Mil (1988)	Un Hombre Discreto (1989)

Uno Entre Mil (English: One among a thousand) is the third studio album by Mexican pop singer Mijares. This album was released in 1988 earning 3 Gold and 1 platinum discs. It was dedicated to his father.

== History ==
This album was the end of the artistic relationship between the production team of the 1980s: Miguel Blasco, José Ramón Florez, Jesus Glück, Gian Pietro Felisatti. Mijares wanted to evolve, renew his career, and he made it. This album has the Spanish version cover of "Uno su mille" (Uno entre mil) of the Italian singer Gianni Morandi.

== Track listing ==
=== Lp Album ===
Tracks:

1. Soldado del amor - 3:40
2. Un centavo de amor - 3:54
3. Como un ladrón - 3:51
4. Con un nudo en la garganta - 3:28
5. Tan solo - 3:57
6. La guerra del amor - 4:20
7. Uno entre mil (Uno su mille) - 3:29
8. El breve espacio - 4:04
9. No quiero perderte - 3:11
10. Nube azul - 4:00

== Singles ==
- Soldado del amor
- Uno entre mil
- Tan solo
- El breve espacio

=== Single charts ===
#	Title	Mexico	United States Hot Lat.	Argentina	Costa Rica	Chile	Colombia	Venezuela	Dominican Republic
1.	"Soldado del amor"	#1	#12	#1	#1	#1	#1	#1	#1
2.	"Uno entre mil"	#1	#9	#1	#1	#1	#1	#1	#1
3.	"Tan solo"	#5	-	#13	#14	#10	#20	#18	#2
4.	"El breve espacio"	#5	-	#10	#7	#8	#7	#20	#3

=== Album charts ===
The album reached the 19th position in Billboard Latin Pop Albums.
