= Top of the Line (Tito El Bambino album) =

Studio album by Tito "El Bambino"
- Released: March 21, 2006
- Recorded: 2005–2006
- Genre: Reggaeton
- Label: EMI Televisa
- Producer: Luny Tunes; Tainy; Noriega; Nales; Thilo; Santana; Nesty "La Mente Maestra"; Naldo; Nely "El Arma Secreta"; Echo; Mr. G; Victor "El Nasi"; DJ Giann; Dexter & Mr. Greenz; Escobar & Fade

Tito "El Bambino" chronology
Season Finale (2005)	Top of the Line (2006)	It's My Time (2007)

Singles from Top of the Line
- 1. "Caile" Released: 2006; 2. "Flow Natural" Released: 2006; 3. "Mía" Released: 2006; 4. "Tu Cintura" Released: 2007

Alternative cover
- Top of the Line: El Internacional re-edition cover

Singles from Top of the Line: El Internacional
- 1. "Siente El Boom (remix)" Released: 2007; 2. "Enamorando" Released: 2007; 3. "Bailarlo" Released: 2007

Top of the Line is the debut solo album by Tito "El Bambino". It was released on March 21, 2006 by EMI Televisa Music. Top of The Line featured 20 songs, with collaboration from artists such as Daddy Yankee, Don Omar and Beenie Man. It featured quite a number of hits, such as "Caile", "Mia" (with Daddy Yankee), "Tu Cintura" (with Don Omar), "Flow Natural" (with Beenie Man and Deevani) "Secreto", "Máximo", "Tuve Que Morir" and "Me da Miedo" among others. "Caile" was the first single and it peaked at number one in the Billboard Hot Latin charts. Top of the Line: El Internacional edition includes a bonus DVD featuring live concert footage and music videos. It was released on February 6, 2007 and was nominated for a Lo Nuestro Award for Urban Album of the Year.

== Track listing ==
Standard edition
No.	Title	Producer credits	Length
1.	"Intro"	Nely; Tainy	1:36
2.	"Caile" (featuring Mr. Phillips)	Luny Tunes; Tainy; Nales; Thilo	3:11
3.	"Mi Chica Rebelde"	Nesty; Victor; Naldo	3:12
4.	"Mía" (featuring Daddy Yankee)	Nely	3:51
5.	"Secreto"	Luny Tunes; Nales	2:41
6.	"Máximo"	Nely; Naldo	3:04
7.	"Tu Cintura" (featuring Don Omar)	Luny Tunes; Tainy	3:07
8.	"Me da Miedo"	Santana	2:45
9.	"Reto"	Luny Tunes; Tainy	2:46
10.	"Peligro"	Luny Tunes; Tainy	3:13
11.	"Flow Natural" (featuring Beenie Man and Inés)	Luny Tunes; Tainy; Nales	2:53
12.	"Será"	Echo	4:51
13.	"Te Extraño"	Nely	3:06
14.	"¿Dónde Están?"	Naldo; Tainy	2:51
15.	"Corre y Dile"	Tainy	3:09
16.	"Grito Latino"	Tainy	3:01
17.	"Me Tiemblan Las Manos"	Mr. G	2:42
18.	"Súbelo"	Nely; Naldo	3:03
19.	"Sonsoneo"	Máximo Torres	3:22
20.	"Tuve Que Morir" (outro)	Gómez	2:22

El Internacional – CD
No.	Title	Producer credits	Length
1.	"Intro"	Nely; Tainy	1:36
2.	"Bailarlo"	Mr. G	3:18
3.	"Voy a Mi"	Doble A & Nales	3:20
4.	"Enamorado"	Escobar & Fade	3:40
5.	"Calentandote"	Escobar & Fade	3:10
6.	"Siente El Boom (remix)" (featuring De La Ghetto and Jowell & Randy)	DJ Giann; Dexter & Mr. Greenz	4:39
7.	"Caile" (featuring Mr. Phillips)	Luny Tunes; Tainy; Nales; Thilo	3:11
8.	"Mi Chica Rebelde"	Nesty; Victor; Naldo	3:12
9.	"Mía" (featuring Daddy Yankee)	Nely	3:51
10.	"Secreto"	Luny Tunes; Nales	2:41
11.	"Tu Cintura" (featuring Don Omar)	Luny Tunes; Tainy	3:07
12.	"Me da Miedo"	Santana	2:45
13.	"Reto"	Luny Tunes; Tainy	2:46
14.	"Peligro"	Luny Tunes; Tainy	3:13
15.	"Flow Natural" (featuring Beenie Man and Inés)	Luny Tunes; Tainy; Nales	2:53
16.	"Será"	Echo	4:51
17.	"¿Dónde Están?"	Naldo; Tainy	2:51
18.	"Corre y Dile"	Tainy	3:09
19.	"Tuve Que Morir" (outro)	Gómez	2:22

El Internacional – DVD
No.	Title	Length
1.	"EDK / Presentaciones en Vivo"	7:52
2.	"Entrevista"	8:46
3.	"Outro"	4:34
4.	"Caile" (music video)	3:11
5.	"Flow Natural" (music video) (featuring Beenie Man and Inés)	2:53
6.	"Galería de Fotos"

- "Galería de Fotos" is Spanish for photo gallery. This is not a video and that's why there is not time limit on it.
- An EP version of El Internacional (The International) is available on all digital streaming platforms. It contains tracks 2–5. For some reason, the full edition isn't available. It could probably be because tracks 7–19 are from the standard edition. Also, some of the standard edition tracks are not in the international version.

== Reception ==
Professional ratings
Review scores
Source	Rating
AllMusic	3.5/5 stars

Top of the Line was a hit, reaching number one in Puerto Rico and knocking R.K.M & Ken-Y's album, Masterpiece, to number two (which was a huge achievement, as R.K.M & Ken-Y were being called "The New Héctor & Tito" and their CD, Masterpiece, was also an incredible hit). However, even though Top of The Line sold incredibly well, it fell short of beating Masterpiece's record of most CDs sold in the first week of release in Puerto Rico. The album would eventually reach Latin Platinum status, selling over 200,000 copies.

== Chart performance ==
Chart (2006)	Peak position
US Billboard 200	85
US Top Latin Albums (Billboard)	3
US Latin Rhythm Albums (Billboard)	1
Chart (2007)	Peak position
US Top Latin Albums (Billboard)	50
US Latin Rhythm Albums (Billboard)	8

== Sales and certifications ==
Region	Certification	Certified units/sales
United States (RIAA)	Platinum (Latin)	100,000^{^}
^{^} Shipments figures based on certification alone.
