= Me Gusta Todo de Ti =

Studio album by Banda El Recodo
- Released: 1 December 2009
- Genre: Banda
- Length: 36:39; 56:39 (Deluxe)
- Label: Fonovisa

Banda El Recodo chronology
Te Presumo (2008)	Me Gusta Todo de Ti (2009)	Las Numero Uno (2010)

Singles from Me Gusta Todo de Ti
- 1. "Me Gusta Todo de Ti" Released: 2009; 2. "Dime Que Me Quieres" Released: 2010

Professional ratings
Review scores
Source	Rating
Allmusic	4/5 stars

Me Gusta Todo de Ti (I Like Everything About You) is the title of a studio album released by Mexican group Banda El Recodo on 1 December 2009. This album includes the Billboard Top Latin Songs number-one single of the same name. It was released to celebrate the 70th anniversary of the band formation and comprises twelve tracks with different rhythms, such as ballads, charangas, corridos, cumbias and rancheras; a DVD was also recorded to illustrate the band history.

== Track listing ==
The information from Allmusic.

No.	Title	Writer(s)	Length
1.	"Me Gusta Todo de Ti"	Horacio Palencia	3:03
2.	"Con Eso Tengo"	Luciano Luna	2:57
3.	"Perro Bichi y Mujeriego"	Miguel Ángel Romero	2:32
4.	"Quisiera Quererte Más"	Ignacio Hernández	2:57
5.	"Dime Que Me Quieres"	Luna, Romero	3:10
6.	"Yo Te Daría Mi Vida"	Alejandro Ojeda	3:34
7.	"Ya No Te Voy a Rogar"	Noé Hernández	3:19
8.	"Tiro Arriba"	Luis Lizárraga	2:34
9.	"Quiero Robarme Tu Corazón"	N. Hernández, Palencia	3:27
10.	"Sólo Para Tí"	Juan José Leyva, Juan Diego Sandoval	2:48
11.	"Yo Por Nada de Este Mundo"	Mario Torres	3:13
12.	"Caminando y Meando"	Juan Carlos Vicencio	2:47

== Charts ==
=== Weekly charts ===
Chart (2009–2010)	Peak position
Mexican Albums (AMPROFON)	55
US Top Latin Albums (Billboard)	7
US Regional Mexican Albums (Billboard)	2

=== Year-end charts ===
Chart (2010)	Position
US Top Latin Albums (Billboard)	25

== Sales and certifications ==
Region	Certification	Certified units/sales
Mexico (AMPROFON)	Platinum	60,000^{‡}
^{‡} Sales+streaming figures based on certification alone.
