= Te Pido Perdón =

Single by Tito El Bambino

from the album El Patrón: La Victoria
- Released: January 2010
- Recorded: 2009
- Length: 4:07
- Label: Siente
- Songwriter: Efraín Fines
- Producer: Nérol

Tito El Bambino singles chronology
"Feliz Navidad" (2009)	"Te Pido Perdón" (2010)	"Te Comence a Querer" (2010)

Banda el Recodo singles chronology
"Me Gusta Todo de Tí" (2010)	"Te Pido Perdón (banda version)" (2010)	"Dime Que Me Quieres" (2010)

Victor Manuelle singles chronology
"Mirame" (2009)	"Te Pido Perdon (remix)" (2010)

"Te Pido Perdón" (English: "I Beg For Pardon" or "I Ask for Forgiveness") is the second single by reggaeton artist Tito El Bambino from the special edition of his third studio album El Patrón. The banda version of this song can be found on Banda el Recodo's album Las Numero Uno.

== Track listing ==
US CD single

1. "Te Pido Perdón" (album version) – 2:50
2. "Te Pido Perdón" (instrumental) – 2:50

Official remixes

1. "Te Pido Perdón" [featuring Víctor Manuelle] – 2:50
2. "Te Pido Perdón" (banda version) [featuring Banda el Recodo] – 2:52 from the greatest hits album of Banda el Recodo: Las Numero Uno

== Charts ==
Chart (2010)	Peak position
U.S. Billboard Hot Latin Songs	3
U.S. Billboard Latin Pop Airplay	4
U.S. Billboard Latin Tropical Airplay	2
U.S. Billboard Heatseekers Songs	16

== See also ==
- List of Billboard Latin Rhythm Airplay number ones of 2010
