= Manuel Mijares/Soñador =

Soñador

Studio album by Mijares
- Released: 1986
- Recorded: 1985–86
- Genre: Pop
- Label: EMI
- Producer: Miguel Blasco

Mijares chronology
Soñador (1986)	Amor y Rock and Roll (1987)

Soñador
- Second Edition

Soñador is the debut solo album by Mexican pop singer Mijares. The album has two official names, Manuel Mijares and Soñador (Dreamer), and was edited in 1986.

== History ==
Originally, this work was issued as a self-titled album, but it was reduced to his artistic name Mijares. This was a big beginning for the singer, and it was under the production of Miguel Blasco, who already several hits with singers like Daniela Romo, Yuri, Pandora, among others. They hit the target with his first international triumph track "Bella" (Beautiful woman). He collaborated with songwriters like José Ramón Florez, Hernaldo Zúñiga, Gian Pietro Felisatti, and Marco Flores. In the LP album, it shows the track "Poco a poco" (Little by little), but it was excluded from the CD version for "Soñador", and the title of the album was changed to the name of that song. "Soñador" was the song that Mijares performed to participate in OTI Festival, reaching third place.

== Track listing ==
=== Lp Album ===
Tracks:

1. Siempre - 3:32
2. Bella - 3:44
3. Nunca sabras amar - 3:20
4. Poco a poco - 3:32
5. A corazón abierto - 3:38
6. Amor has de esperar - 3:14
7. Volveré a nacer - 3:44
8. Al caminar - 3:07
9. Culpable - 3:31
10. Vete por favor amor - 3:33

=== Soñador (LP 2nd Edicion/CD Version) ===
1. Siempre
2. Bella
3. Nunca sabras amar
4. Soñador
5. A corazón abierto
6. Amor has de esperar
7. Volveré a nacer
8. Al caminar
9. Culpable
10. Vete por favor amor

== Singles ==
- Bella (Beautiful woman)
- Soñador (Dreamer)
- Siempre (Always)
- Al Caminar (When walking)
