= El Encuentro (Mijares album) =

El Encuentro/ Akustic

Live album by Mijares
- Released: 21 November 1995 (Mexico)
- Recorded: Televisa's San Angel Studios, Mexico City, Mexico, August 9, 1995
- Genre: Pop; Concert
- Length: 71:58
- Label: EMI Televisa Music
- Director: Mario Ruiz; Oscar López

Mijares chronology
Vive en mí (1994)	El Encuentro/ Akustic (1995)	Querido Amigo (1996)

El Encuentro (English: The Encounter) is a live album by Mexican pop singer Mijares. This album was released on 21 November 1995. Sometimes is called "Akustic". This album was produced by Oscar López. It's a live collection of his old hits and some new songs. Recorded live at Televisa's San Angel Studios, Mexico City, Mexico on 9 August 1995.

== History ==
This concert was recorded for the Mexican television, when Televisa pretended to make some musical programs called "Akustic" alike the concept of MTV Unplugged. For this concert he had some special guests like: Lucero, Barrio Boyzz and the Argentinean Patricia Sosa where they sang the Spanish version of the Italian song "Ti lascerò" which was originally recorded by Anna Oxa and Fausto Leali. It has 2 new songs (apart from the duets): "Mi única droga eres tú" (My only drug is you) and "El corazón sigue aferrado" (The heart is still grappled).

== Track listing ==
Tracks:

1. Volverás
2. No Se Murió el Amor
3. Tan solo
4. Mi Única Droga Eres Tú
5. Medley (Para Amarnos Mas / Me Acordare De Ti / Que Nada Nos Separe / Para Amarnos Mas
6. Tarde O Temprano (Duet with Barrio Boyzz)
7. Palabras de Mujer/ Perfidia
8. El Corazón Sigue Aferrado
9. El Breve Espacio en Que No Estás
10. Te dejaré (Ti Lascero) (Duet with Patricia Sosa)
11. Corazón Salvaje
12. Soldado del Amor
13. Cuatro Veces Amor (Duet with Lucero)
14. Bella
15. No Hace Falta
16. Uno Entre Mil
17. Medley 2 (Bonita / A Pedir Su Mano / Para Nene Para / Bonita)

== Singles ==
- Cuatro veces amor
- Tarde o Temprano
- Tan Solo

=== Lucero Duet ===
"Hasta que se me hizo Manuelito..." (It means something like "Finally my dream has been come true, Manuelito..."); this is the phrase which Lucero is heard at the beginning of the song "4 Veces Amor" (4 Times Love) their first duet ever, the song was a gigantic success that helped the sales of the album.

=== Single Charts ===
#	Title	Mexico	United States Lat. Airplay	El Salvador	Costa Rica	Panama	Guatemala	Chile	Nicaragua
1.	"Cuatro veces amor"	#1	#5	#1	#6	#1	#1	#1	#1

== Credits ==
=== Special Guests ===
- Lucero
- Barrio Boyzz
- Patricia Sosa

=== Background Vocals ===
- Amaury López
- Doris Eugenio

=== Percussion ===
- Armando Espinoza
- Sammy Figueroa
- Graham Hawthorne

=== Guitars ===
- Kevin Reed
- Ira Siegel

=== Winds ===
- Bobby Martinez (Saxophone)
- Isidro Martínez (Trumpet)

=== Arranger & Keyboards ===
- Didi Gutman (also organ)
- Amaury Lopez

=== Others ===
Mastering:

- Don Grossinger

Mixing

- David Dachinger

Set Up:

- Adolfo Pérez Butro (Photography)
- Luis Miguel Menendez (Photography)
- Jose Luis Mijares (Graphic Design, Illustrations)

Executive Producer:

- Mario Ruiz
