= It's My Time (Tito El Bambino album) =

Studio album by Tito "El Bambino"
- Released: October 2, 2007
- Recorded: 2007
- Genre: Reggaeton
- Label: EMI Televisa
- Producer: Urba & Monserrate; Mambo Kingz; Luny Tunes; Tainy; Noriega; Raphy Pina; The Neptunes; Nely "El Arma Secreta"; Naldo; Eddie Pérez "Scarlito"

Tito "El Bambino" chronology
Top of the Line (2006)	It's My Time (2007)	El Patrón (2009)

Singles from It's My Time
- 1. "Sólo Dime Que Sí" Released: 2007; 2. "Sol, Playa y Arena" Released: 2007; 3. "El Tra" Released: 2008; 4. "En La Disco" Released: 2008; 5. "La Busco" Released: 2008

It's My Time is the second studio album by Puerto Rican singer and songwriter Tito El Bambino, released on October 2, 2007. The first single released was "Sólo Dime Que Sí". It reached number one in the Billboard Hot Latin charts. The second single confirmed by Tito in an interview in Puerto Rico's No Te Duermas he said "El Tra" will be the second single, which receive some airplay.

== Track listing ==
No.	Title	Producer credits	Length
1.	"Intro"	Thilo	1:24
2.	"El Tra"	Urba & Monserrate; Naldo	2:37
3.	"La Pelea"	Luny Tunes; Noriega	2:49
4.	"Fans" (featuring R.K.M & Ken-Y)	Mambo Kingz	3:28
5.	"El Bum Bum"	Urba & Monserrate; Naldo	2:53
6.	"Último Abrazo"	Mambo Kingz	4:14
7.	"Booty" (additional vocals by Pharrell)	The Neptunes	3:39
8.	"Novio Imaginario"	Mambo Kingz	3:02
9.	"Solo Dime Que Sí"	Urba & Monserrate	2:52
10.	"La Busco" (featuring Toby Love)	Eddie Pérez "Scarlito"	4:08
11.	"En La Disco" (featuring Olga Tañon)	Elliot "El Mago De Oz"	3:49
12.	"Esto Se Baila Así"	Nely	3:22
13.	"El Mambo de Las Shorty's"	Eddie Pérez "Scarlito"	3:36
14.	"No Quiero Soltarte"	Tainy	2:47
15.	"Sol, Playa y Arena" (featuring Jadiel)	Urba & Monserrate	3:08
16.	"Outro"	Gomez	3:44

== Chart performance ==
Chart (2007)	Peak position
US Billboard 200	167
US Top Latin Albums (Billboard)	8
US Latin Rhythm Albums (Billboard)	1
Venezuelan Albums (Recordland)	1

== See also ==
- List of number-one Billboard Latin Rhythm Albums of 2007
