= Invicto =

Studio album by Tito El Bambino
- Released: November 19, 2012
- Recorded: 2011–2012
- Genre: Latin pop; reggaeton; bachata; merengue; salsa
- Length: 46:56
- Label: On Fire

Tito El Bambino chronology
Invencible (2011)	Invicto (2012)	Alta Jerarquía (2014)

Singles from Invicto
- 1. "Dame La Ola" Released: May 26, 2012; 2. "¿Por Qué Les Mientes?" Released: November 19, 2012; 3. "Tu Olor" Released: April 16, 2013

Invicto is the fifth studio album by Puerto Rican singer and songwriter Tito El Bambino, released on November 19, 2012, by On Fire Music. The songs "Dame La Ola" and "Por Qué Les Mientes", a duet with Marc Anthony, are the first two singles of the album. "Tu Olor" was released as the third single. Invicto won the Lo Nuestro Award for Urban Album of the Year.

== Track listing ==
No.	Title	Length
1.	"¿Por Qué Les Mientes?" (featuring Marc Anthony)	3:34
2.	"Me Fascinas"	4:01
3.	"Dime Si No Es Verdad"	2:53
4.	"Tu Olor"	3:12
5.	"Ahora No Sé"	3:10
6.	"Me Gustas" (featuring Yandel)	3:21
7.	"Alzo Mi Voz" (featuring Tercer Cielo)	3:41
8.	"El No Te Lo Hace Como Yo"	3:15
9.	"Llegaste Tú"	3:13
10.	"¿Qué Ellos Pretenden?"	3:21
11.	"Dame La Ola (salsa version)" (featuring Tito Nieves)	4:13
12.	"Dámelo"	2:30
13.	"Dame La Ola"	3:06
14.	"¿Por Qué Les Mientes? (alternative version)" (featuring Marc Anthony)	3:33

Bonus tracks
No.	Title	Length
15.	"Carnaval"	2:48
16.	"Tu Olor" (featuring Wisin)	3:36

== Personnel ==
- Composer - Carlos E. Ortiz Rivera
- Arreglos - Chris Jedi
- Mezcla - Francisco Hurtado
- Composer - Jose A. Torres
- Mezcla - Jose Cotto
- Composer - Juan Carlos Rodriguez
- Arreglos, Composer - Luis Berrios Nieves
- Arreglos - Luis E. Ortiz
- Composer - Luis E. Ortiz Rivera
- Featured Artist - Marc Anthony
- Composer - Mario Rivera
- Arreglos - Michael Monserrate Sosa
- Arreglos - Musicologo
- Arreglos - Noangel Velazquez "Noamuzik"
- Arregos - Ramon Sanchez
- Mezcla - Ronnie Torres
- Featured Artist - Tercer Cielo
- Composer, Primary Artist - Tito "El Bambino" El Patron
- Featured Artist - Tito Nieves
- Composer, Featured Artist - Yandel

== Charts ==
=== Weekly charts ===
Chart (2012)	Peak position
US Top Latin Albums (Billboard)	1
US Tropical Albums (Billboard)	1
Venezuelan Albums (Recordland)	9

=== Year-end charts ===
Chart (2013)	Position
US Latin Albums (Billboard)	24
US Tropical Albums (Billboard)	5

== Certification ==
Region	Certification	Certified units/sales
United States (RIAA)	Gold (Latin)	30,000^{^}
^{^} Shipments figures based on certification alone.
