= Caile (song) =

Single by Tito El Bambino

from the album Top of the Line
- Released: November 2, 2005
- Recorded: 2005
- Genre: Reggaeton
- Length: 3:12
- Label: EMI Televisa
- Songwriters: Efraín Fines Nevares; Francisco Saldaña

"Caile" is the first single by Puerto Rican reggaeton singer Tito El Bambino from his debut studio album Top of the Line, released on November 2, 2005. It was produced by Luny Tunes, Tainy, and Nales.

== Remix ==
The remix features Daddy Yankee, Zion, Voltio, and Angel Doze.

== Chart performance ==
As his debut single, the song managed to become a major success in the summer of 2006, topping in the top three on four consecutive charts. The song managed to peak at number two on the Billboard Bubbling Under Hot 100 (number 102 on the Billboard Hot 100), proving to have been successful enough to chart on the Hot 100. The song also peaked at number two on the Hot Latin Songs chart. The song even topped the Latin Tropical Airplay chart in 2006.

=== Chart positions ===
Chart (2006)	Peak position
U.S. Billboard Radio Songs	68
U.S. Billboard Bubbling Under Hot 100	2
U.S. Billboard Hot Latin Songs	2
U.S. Billboard Latin Tropical Airplay	1
U.S. Billboard Latin Rhythm Airplay	2
