= Cazador, San Luis =

Coordinates: 33°51′S 66°23′W

Cazador (San Luis)
- Municipality and village
- Interactive map of Cazador (San Luis)
- Country: Argentina
- Province: San Luis Province
- Time zone: UTC−3 (ART)

Cazador (San Luis) is a village and municipality in San Luis Province in central Argentina.
