= Alta Jerarquía =

Studio album by Tito El Bambino
- Released: November 24, 2014
- Recorded: 2013–2014
- Genre: Reggaeton; bachata; salsa
- Length: 54:00
- Label: On Fire
- Producer: Luis Berrios Nieves; Ida Nevarez; Tito El Bambino

Tito El Bambino chronology
Invicto (2012)	Alta Jerarquía (2014)	El Muñeco (2020)

Singles from Alta Jerarquía
- 1. "A Que No Te Atreves" Released: August 26, 2014; 2. "Controlando" Released: October 17, 2014; 3. "Adicto a Tus Redes" Released: November 24, 2014

Alta Jerarquía is the sixth studio album by Puerto Rican singer Tito El Bambino, released on November 24, 2014 by On Fire Music. This album contains more urban songs and collaborations due to requests from the artist by the fans through social networks, who wanted the singer returned to the genre with which he became known. The album included the singles "A Que No Te Atreves" (featuring Chencho of the duo Plan B), "Controlando" and "Adicto a Tus Redes" (featuring Nicky Jam).

It debuted at number three on the US Billboard Top Latin Albums chart, selling over 3,000 copies on the first week.

== Track listing ==
No.	Title	Length
1.	"Sólido"	2:59
2.	"Como Antes" (featuring Zion & Lennox)	3:58
3.	"Controlando"	2:55
4.	"A Que No Te Atreves" (featuring Chencho)	3:09
5.	"Adicto A Tus Redes" (featuring Nicky Jam)	3:19
6.	"Miénteme" (featuring Anthony Santos)	4:39
7.	"El Está Celoso"	3:14
8.	"Adicta Al Sexo" (featuring Randy)	3:21
9.	"Contigo"	3:33
10.	"Que Les Pasó" (featuring Vico C)	3:36
11.	"Compromiso" (featuring Alexis & Fido)	3:20
12.	"La Calle Lo Pidió" (featuring Cosculluela)	3:34
13.	"Ricos y Famosos" (featuring Wisin and Ñengo Flow)	3:28
14.	"A Que No Te Atreves" (remix) (featuring Daddy Yankee, Chencho and Yandel)	3:52
15.	"Gatilleros" (featuring Cosculluela)	2:50
16.	"Hay Que Comer" (featuring Andy Montañez)	3:37

Bonus tracks
No.	Title	Length
17.	"Pensando En Ti"	3:00
18.	"La Calle Lo Pidió" (remix) (featuring Cosculluela, J Álvarez, Nicky Jam, Wisin and Zion)	4:24

== Reissue ==
On May 26, 2015, Alta Jerarquía: Instrumental, a reissue with all instrumentals used in the album, was released only on digital format.

== Charts ==
Chart (2014)	Peak position
US Top Latin Albums (Billboard)	3
US Latin Rhythm Albums (Billboard)	1
US Top Rap Albums (Billboard)	18
