= Llueve el Amor =

"Llueve el amor"

Single by Tito El Bambino

from the album El Patrón: Invencible
- Released: November 26, 2010
- Genre: Latin pop
- Length: 3:56
- Label: Siente
- Songwriters: Efraín Nevares; Luis Berrios Nieves; Joel Baez
- Producers: Nérol; Tito El Bambino

Tito El Bambino singles chronology
"Te comencé a querer" (2010)	"Llueve el amor" (2010)	"Llama el Sol" (2011)

Banda el Recodo singles chronology
"Dime Que Me Quieres" (2010)	"Llueve el amor (banda version)" (2010)	"Te Quiero a Morir" (2011)

Jerry Rivera singles chronology
"¿Quien de los dos?" (2009)	"Llueve el amor (salsa version)" (2010)	"Solo pienso en ti" (2011)

"Llueve el amor" (English: "It Rains Love") is a song by Puerto Rican singer and songwriter Tito El Bambino. It was released as the first single on November 26, 2010, from the album, El Patrón: Invencible (2011). The banda version of the song is also in his album which features Banda el Recodo. The theme was used for the opening sequence of the telenovela Eva Luna.

== Music video ==
The music video for "Llueve el Amor" was directed by Gustavo Camacho and was filmed in Aspen, Colorado, New Orleans, Louisiana and Bogotá and Cartagena in Colombia.

== Track listing ==
Digital download

1. "Llueve El Amor" – 3:56

== Official versions ==
- "Llueve el Amor" [original version] – featuring Lucero
- "Llueve el Amor" [banda version] – featuring Banda el Recodo
- "Llueve el Amor" [salsa version] – featuring Jerry Rivera

== Charts ==
Chart (2011)	Peak position
US Hot Latin Songs (Billboard)	5
US Tropical Airplay (Billboard)	1
US Latin Rhythm Airplay (Billboard)	1
Venezuela (Record Report)	1
Venezuela Top Latino (Record Report)	1

== Release history ==
Region	Date	Label	Format
United States	November 26, 2010	Siente	Digital download

== See also ==
- List of Billboard Latin Rhythm Airplay number ones of 2011
- List of number-one Billboard Tropical Songs of 2011
