= Me Gusta Todo de Ti (song) =

"Me Gusta Todo de Tí"

Single by Banda el Recodo

from the album Me Gusta Todo de Tí
- Released: 2009
- Recorded: 2009
- Genre: Banda
- Length: 3:03
- Label: Fonovisa
- Songwriter(s): Horacio Palencia

Banda el Recodo singles chronology
"Y Llegaste Tu" (2008)	"Me Gusta Todo de Tí" (2009)	"Te Pido Perdón (Banda version)" (2010)

"Me Gusta Todo de Ti" (English: I Like Everything About You) is a Spanish-language song written by Horacio Palencia and recorded by Mexican ensemble Banda El Recodo. It was released as the lead single from the album of the same name. The song reached number one on the Top Latin Songs chart in late 2009.

== Charts ==
=== Weekly charts ===
Chart (2009)	Peak position
US Bubbling Under Hot 100 Singles (Billboard)	14
US Hot Latin Songs (Billboard)	1
US Regional Mexican Airplay (Billboard)	1

=== Year-end charts ===
Chart (2010)	Position
US Hot Latin Songs (Billboard)	7

=== Decade-end charts ===
Chart (2010–2019)	Position
US Hot Latin Songs (Billboard)	37

== See also ==
- List of number-one Billboard Top Latin Songs of 2010
