= En Vivo (Mijares album) =

Live album by Mijares
- Released: 5 February 2002
- Recorded: 27 & 28 January 2001
- Genre: Pop; Concert
- Label: Universal Latino
- Director: Elizabeth González

Mijares chronology
| Historias de un Amor (2000) | En Vivo (2002) | Dulce Veneno (2002) |

En Vivo (English: Live) is the second live album by Mexican pop singer Mijares. This album was released in 2002 and it was produced by Manuel Mijares himself. It's kind of collection of his greatest hits. His special guest was his wife. This concert was recorded in the Auditorio Nacional of Mexico City between January 27/28, 2001.

== Track listing ==
Tracks:

1. No Se Murió el Amor
2. Corazón Salvaje
3. Que Nada Nos Separe
4. Popurri: Tan Solo/Me Acordaré de Ti/Siempre
5. Bella
6. Bonita
7. El Breve Espacio
8. Te Extraño
9. Soldado del Amor
10. Cuando Me Vaya
11. No Hace Falta
12. Para Amarnos Más
13. El Privilegio de Amar (feat. Lucero)
14. Uno Entre Mil

== Controversy ==
Because of this disc, Mijares and Universal Music Group received a lawsuit from EMI Music, since EMI stated that they had to receive the royalties from the old songs that Mijares recorded when he was with them. The lawsuit never proceeded and it was canceled.
