= Manuel Mijares =

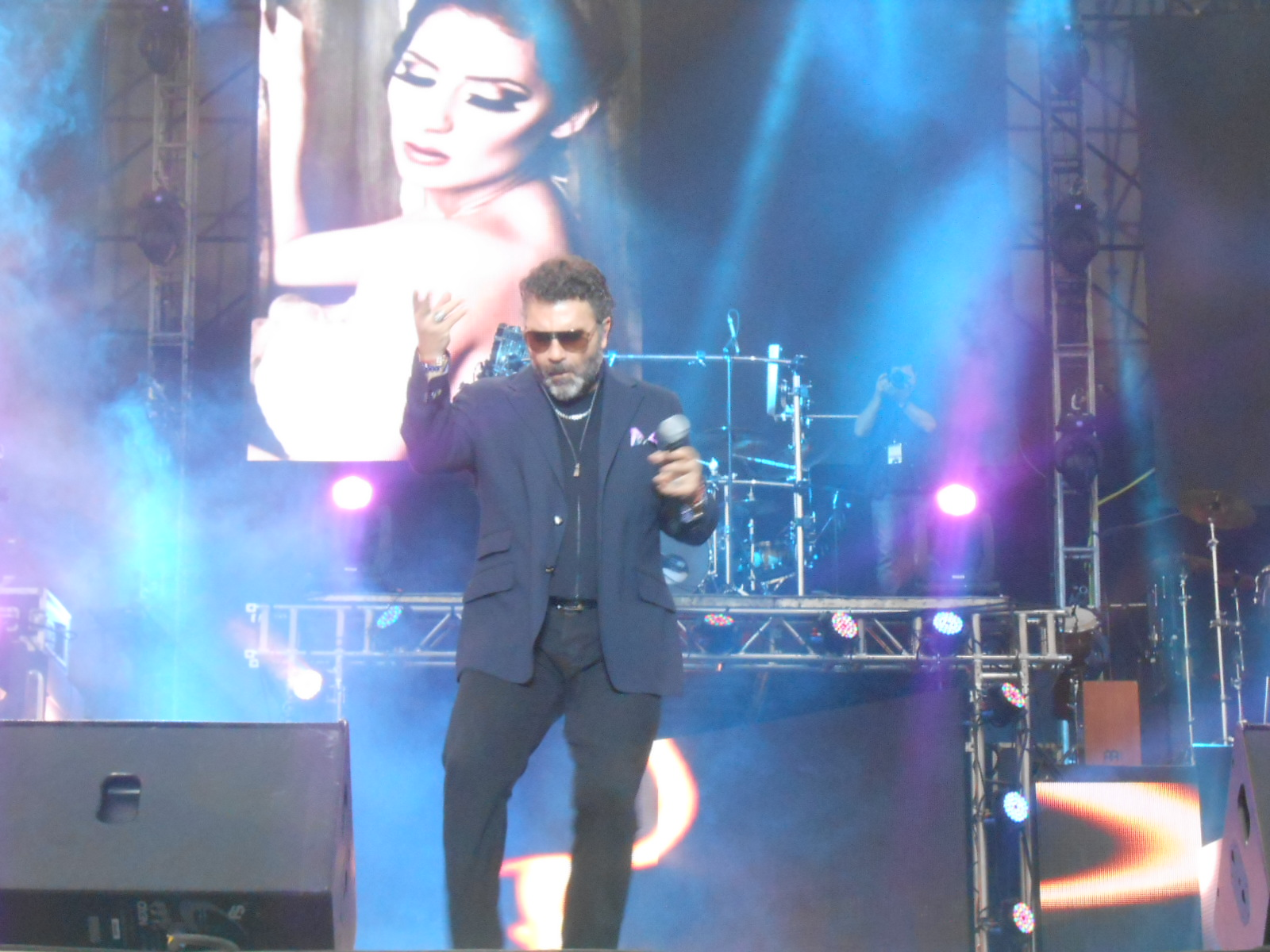
- Mijares with his wife Lucero

Background information
- Also known as: Mijares
- Born: José Manuel Mijares Morán; 7 February 1958 (age 68); Mexico City, Mexico
- Origin: Mexico
- Genres: Latin pop / Mexican pop; folk; Mariachi
- Occupations: Singer, actor
- Years active: 1985–present
- Labels: Capitol; EMI; Mercury; Universal Music; Sony Music; Warner Music Group
- Website: www.mijares.com.mx

José Manuel Mijares Morán (born 7 February 1958 in Mexico City) is an adult-contemporary pop singer who is billed as Manuel Mijares (pronounced [manˈwel miˈxaɾes]) or simply as Mijares. He began his career at age 23 and achieved high popularity from the mid-1980s to mid-1990s in Latin America and Japan mainly. From 1997 to 2011 he was married to Mexican singer/actress Lucero, with whom he has two children.

== Biography ==
Born in Hospital Español in Mexico City in 1958, Mijares is the son of doctor José María Mijares and dance teacher María del Pilar Morán. His grandparents were Asturian immigrants who arrived in Veracruz. He has three brothers: José Luis, Jorge, and Pilar. His mother influenced his artistic direction, and as a child, he was part of the elementary school chorus. He later formed musical groups with friends. As an adult, he received a degree in business administration from the Intercontinental University (Universidad Intercontinental México).

On March 4, 2011, after 14 years of marriage, he and Lucero announced their separation to the media.

=== 1981 to 1989 ===
He made his professional debut in 1981 in a local festival called Valores Juveniles. After living in Japan, where he performed in a nightclub, Mijares worked as a background singer for Latin pop star Emmanuel.

In 1986, he competed in the 15th Mexican national selection for the OTI Festival, placing third with "Soñador", written by Alfredo Díaz Ordaz, and receiving the Breakout Male Artist Award. Also in 1986, he started his solo career after signing with EMI, issuing a self-titled album that featured his first international hits: "Bella" ("Beautiful woman"), "Soñador" ("Dreamer"), "Poco a poco" ("Little by little") and "Siempre" ("Always"), the latter composed by the Nicaraguan songwriter Hernaldo Zúñiga. His debut album was originally credited to "Manuel Mijares", but the disc was later reissued with the billing changed to simply "Mijares." All subsequent recordings were billed under the name "Mijares."

He made his debut as an actor in the 1987 movie Escápate Conmigo. The film was a hit, but his acting career has been limited to cameos, however it was on that shoot he met his wife.

The album Amor y Rock And Roll was released the same year, achieving more success through the single "No se murió el amor" ("The love did not die"), it was his breakout release around the world, it became a number one hit in Mexico and top ten in Japan in the summer of 1987. The album's second single "Un montón de verano" ("A heap of summer"), is also a Hernaldo Zúñiga's composition. Mijares earned the gold medal at the Yamaha Music Festival, something that few Latin singers have achieved.

Both Uno Entre Mil (1988) and Un Hombre Discreto (1989) continued his winning streak, achieving gold and platinum certification. Singles included "Soldado del amor" ("Soldier of love"), "Uno entre mil" ("One among a thousand"), "Baño de Mujeres" ("Ladies Room") and "Para Amarnos Más" ("To love each other more"), it was the biggest hit from the album, the single reached the top position in Mexico, Argentina and Spain; it also peaked at number three on the U.S Hot Latin Tracks chart.

He also performed on the Spanish-language soundtrack of Walt Disney Pictures's Oliver & Company.

=== The 1990s ===
In 1990, Mijares released a one-off album recorded in Italian, Nuda liberta. He then followed with Que Nada Nos Separe, which became one of the biggest-selling discs in his career.

In 1992, he released Maria Bonita, a collection of boleros with the title track serving as a tribute to actress María Félix. Bebu Silvetti produced the album, which became Mijares' biggest-selling album to date. The disc was named album of the year by El Heraldo. The same year, he performed the Spanish-language version of the title track to the movie Beauty and the Beast along with Rocío Banquells.

In 1993, he performed the theme of the telenovela Corazón salvaje, a major hit single. The song was included on the disc Encadenado.

In 1996, technology allowed Mijares to sing with the deceased Pedro Infante on the well-received Querido Amigo.

On January 18, 1997, he married Lucero. The news of their marriage would become an international event and Televisa earned the rights to televise it, gaining more than 40 million viewers.

In 1998, El Privilegio de Amar achieved platinum status in Mexico, powered by the title track, which featured Lucero on backing vocals.

=== 2000 - present ===
In 2000, DreamWorks selected him to perform three songs by Elton John in Spanish for The Road to El Dorado. This same year he released Historias de un Amor, in which he co-wrote some of the songs. Mijares' 2004 album, Cappuccino, was highlighted by a duet with Canadian singer-songwriter Gino Vannelli. In 2005, Mijares released Honor a Quien Honor Merece, a tribute to Mexican star José José, whom he considers one of his main influences. The album received gold and platinum certification in Mexico. Also successful was Acompañame, a duet album with Yuri that achieved platinum certification in 2006. His 2008 album Hablemos de Amor performed well on the charts, powered by the hit "Te ha robado" ("He has stolen you"), which was the theme from the telenovela Querida Enemiga. The following year, Mijares moved to Warner Music Latina for the album Vivir Así. The disc reached No. 2 on the official Amprofon lists and spent more than two months in the top 10. It was certified Gold during its eighth week of release and received platinum certification a few weeks later. A sequel, Vivir Así Volumen II, was released on April 13, 2010; the album reached the top 10 and earned Gold certification. In 2011, he celebrated the 25th anniversary of his music career with two sold-out concerts at the Auditorio Nacional in Mexico City. A CD/DVD set capturing the show was issued in September as Mijares 25: Zona Preferente. The release debuted at No. 2 on the official Amprofon chart during its first week of release. It was certified gold a week later. His 2013 release Canto Por Ti debuted at No. 1 in Mexico, ultimately spending five non-consecutive weeks in the top spot.

== Albums ==
=== Albums ===
- Canto Por Ti (2013)
- Mijares 25: Zona Preferente (2011)
- Vivir Así Volumen II (2010)
- Vivir Así (2009)
- Hablemos de Amor (2008)
- Swing en tu Idioma (2007)
- Acompáñame (2006)
- Honor a Quien Honor Merece (2005)
- Cappuccino (2004)
- Dulce Veneno (2002)
- En Vivo (2001)
- Historias de un Amor (2000)
- El Privilegio de Amar (1998)
- Estar sin ti (1997)
- Querido Amigo (1996)
- El Encuentro (1995)
- Vive en mí (1994)
- Encadenado (1993)
- María Bonita (1992)
- Que Nada Nos Separe (1991)
- Nuda Libertà (1990)
- Un Hombre Discreto (1989)
- Uno Entre Mil (1988)
- Amor y Rock and Roll (1987)
- Manuel Mijares (1986)

=== Compilations ===
- Las Número 1 de Mijares (2005)
- Éxitos Eternos (Mijares album) (2004)
- Yuri y Mijares:Juntos por Primera Vez (2003)
- Latin Classics Mijares (2003)
- 30 Éxitos Insuperables (2003)
- Sólo lo Mejor 20 Éxitos (2002)
- Antología (2002)
- Corazón Salvaje (1994)
- Quien Eres (1993)
- Mis Mejores Canciones:17 Super Éxitos (1992)

=== Spanish version soundtracks ===
- El Dorado (2000)
- Beauty and the Beast (1992)
- Oliver & Company (1988)

=== Soap opera themes ===
Song	Telenovela
	Corazón salvaje
	El Privilegio de Amar (feat. Lucero)
	Rebeca
"Amor, amor, amor"	De que te quiero, te quiero
"Te prometí"	La sombra del pasado
	Me declaro culpable (feat. Maria Jose)

== Films ==
- Escápate Conmigo'(1987) as Manuel

== See also ==
- List of best-selling Latin music artists
