= Deevani =

Dominican reggaeton singer

- Also known as: A. Ines Rooney
- Born: Adalgisa Inés Saldaña; 1975 (age 50–51); Dajabón, Dominican Republic
- Genre: Reggaetón
- Occupations: Singer, Songwriter, Executive Professional
- Instrument: Vocals
- Years active: 1996–present
- Labels: Mas Flow Inc., Machete Music, Universal Music

Adalgisa Inés Rooney, better known by her stage name Deevani, is a Dominican Republic reggaeton singer. She is best known for her Hindi vocals on the songs "Mírame" with Daddy Yankee, and "Flow Natural" with Tito El Bambino and Beenie Man.

== Early life ==
Deevani was born in Catalina Island, La Romana Province, Dominican Republic. She grew up in Carolina, Puerto Rico and graduated from Bayard Rustin High School for the Humanities in New York City in 1994. After high school, Rooney returned to Puerto Rico to attend the Instituto de Banca y Comercio to study for an associate's degree, then transferred to Concordia College in New York, where she completed her undergraduate degree in business administration in 1998. Deevani is a poliglot with over 11 languages under her belt. She has three sons. Her last name "Rooney" is from her 2nd husband. As of 2015 Deevani is single.

== Music career ==
Rooney became CEO of Mas Flow, the record label owned by her younger brother, Francisco Saldaña (Luny) of Luny Tunes, in 2002. But helped her little brother behind the scenes, since 1996.

Her 1st husband is from Bangladesh, and through him she discovered the world of Bollywood movies and music. She also studied Arabic, Bengali, Gujarati, Hindi, and Urdu. She likes Bhangra music. Her stage name "Deevani" is Hindi for "crazy girl".

In 2005, Deevani made her recording debut on the Daddy Yankee song "Mírame" from the Luny Tunes compilation album Mas Flow 2. In the U.S., "Flow Natural" peaked at no. 16 on the Billboard Hot Latin Songs chart in September 2006. Later in her career, Deevani appeared on albums by El Roockie in 2007 and Fuego in 2010.
