= El Patrón: Invencible =

Invencible

Studio album by Tito El Bambino
- Released: February 8, 2011; November 21, 2011 (re-edition)
- Recorded: 2010–2011
- Genres: Reggaeton; merengue; bachata; Latin pop
- Label: Siente
- Producers: Nérol; Urba & Monserrate; Sosa; Mambo Kingz; Robert Cora; Luis O'Neill; Haze; Ronnie Torres; Marioso; Nesty "La Mente Maestra"; Victor "El Nasi"

Tito El Bambino chronology
El Patrón (2009)	Invencible (00000001)	Invícto (2012)

Singles from Invencible
- 1. "Llueve el Amor" Released: November 26, 2010; 2. "Llama Al Sol" Released: April 1, 2011

Singles from Invencible 2012
- 1. "Me Voy de la Casa" Released: February 15, 2012

El Patrón: Invencible (The Boss: Invincible), or simply Invencible, is the fourth studio album by Puerto Rican singer and songwriter Tito El Bambino, released on February 8, 2011 by Siente Music. It was produced by Urba & Monserrate, Nérol, Marioso, Mambo Kingz, and among others. It is considered to some fans as a part two to El Patrón. The album won the Latin Grammy Award for Best Contemporary Tropical Album in 2011.

== Track listing ==
Standard edition
No.	Title	Writer(s)	Producer	Length
1.	"Llueve el Amor"	Efraín Fines	Nérol	3:54
2.	"Llama al Sol"	Jhay Cortez		3:26
3.	"Barquito"			3:41
4.	"Máquina del Tiempo" (featuring Wisin & Yandel)			3:54
5.	"Éramos Niños" (featuring Gilberto Santa Rosa and Hector Acosta "El Torito")			4:22
6.	"Chequea Como Se Siente" (featuring Daddy Yankee)			3:31
7.	"Basta Ya"			4:41
8.	"Quiero Besarte" (featuring J-King & Maximan)			3:08
9.	"Ella Es Libre"			4:11
10.	"Dime Como Te Va (featuring Emmanuel "El Bambi")"			4:21
11.	"Basta Ya (pop version)" (featuring Noel Schajris)			3:28
12.	"Apaga La Luz"			4:09
13.	"Candela"			3:28
14.	"Llueve el Amor (banda version)" (featuring Banda El Recodo)			3:51

== Re-edition: Invencible 2012 ==
Invencible 2012 is a re-edition of the album Invencible by the Puerto Rican reggaeton artist Tito El Bambino. The album was released on November 21, 2011 and contains new five songs. These songs are "Me Voy De La Casa", "Me Toca Celebrar", "Quiere Que Le Muestre", "No Está En Na'" and "Olvídate De Mí".

== Track listing ==
Invencible 2012
No.	Title	Writer(s)	Producer	Length
1.	"Me Toca Celebrar"			3:12
2.	"Quiere Que le Muestren" (featuring Julio Voltio and Ñengo Flow)			3:48
3.	"Me Voy de la Casa"			3:36
4.	"No Está en Na'" (featuring Farruko)			3:07
5.	"Apaga La Luz"			4:09
6.	"Olvídate De Mi"			4:09
7.	"Llueve El Amor"	Efraín Fines	Nérol	3:54
8.	"Llama Al Sol"	Jhay Cortez		3:26
9.	"Barquito"			3:41
10.	"Máquina del Tiempo" (featuring Wisin & Yandel)			3:54
11.	"Éramos Niños" (featuring Gilberto Santa Rosa and Hector Acosta "El Torito")			4:22
12.	"Chequea Como Se Siente" (featuring Daddy Yankee)			3:31
13.	"Basta Ya"			4:41
14.	"Quiero Besarte" (featuring J-King & Maximan)			3:08
15.	"Ella Es Libre"			4:11
16.	"Dime Como Te Va (featuring Emmanuel "El Bambi")"			4:21
17.	"Basta Ya (pop version)" (featuring Noel Schajris)			3:28
18.	"Candela"			3:28
19.	"Llueve el Amor (banda version)" (featuring Banda El Recodo)			3:51

== Charts ==
Chart (2011)	Peak position
Ecuadorian Album Chart	33
Mexican International Chart Albums	6
US Billboard 200	95
US Top Latin Albums (Billboard)	4
US Latin Rhythm Albums (Billboard)	2
US Top Rap Albums (Billboard)	8

== Certification ==
Region	Certification	Certified units/sales
United States (RIAA)	Gold (Latin)	50,000^{^}
^{^} Shipments figures based on certification alone.

== Release history ==
List of release dates, showing country, record label, and catalog number
Region	Date	Format	Label	Catalog	Edition
United States	February 8, 2011	CD; digital download	Siente	B004L9B9UG	Standard
