= Tito el Bambino =

Puerto Rican singer (born 1981)

Tito El Bambino
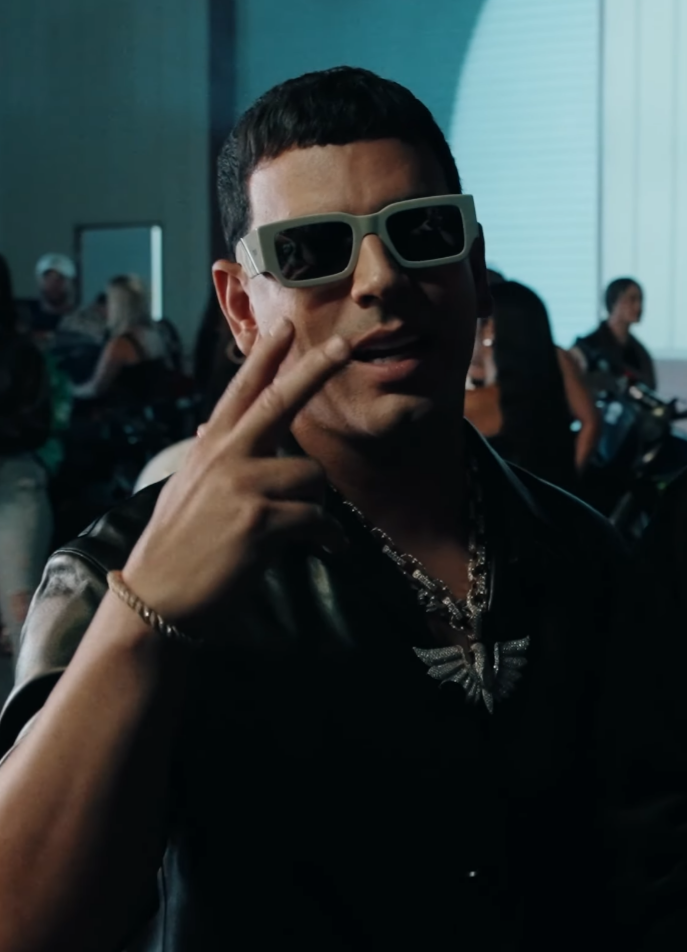
- Tito El Bambino in 2025

Background information
- Born: Efrain David Fines Nevares; October 5, 1981 (age 45)
- Origin: Carolina, Puerto Rico
- Genres: Reggaeton; tropical; Latin pop; dancehall
- Occupations: Singer; songwriter
- Years active: 1995–present
- Label: On Fire
- Formerly of: Héctor & Tito

Efraín David Fines Nevares (born October 5, 1981), known professionally as Tito El Bambino, is a Puerto Rican singer and songwriter who rose to fame as part of the duo Héctor & Tito. In 2010, his song "El Amor", written with Joan Ortiz Espada, was awarded Latin Song of the Year by the American Society of Composers, Authors and Publishers (ASCAP). He was awarded Songwriter of the Year at the 2011 ASCAP.

== Career ==
=== 1996–2004: Héctor & Tito ===
Héctor & Tito released their first album in 1998. Together, they became reggaetón stars, releasing several successful albums and being featured on several compilation records. The two became one of the most sought-out acts in the genre. The duo became the first reggaetoneros to sell-out a massive concert in Puerto Rico, at the iconic Choliseo, paving the path for other artists such as Tego Calderón, Daddy Yankee and others.

Héctor & Tito released a number of hit songs in Latin America, as well as on U.S. Spanish-language radio stations, including "Amor de Colegio" (feat. Don Omar), "Felina", "Baila Morena" (feat. Glory) and "No Le Temas a Él", a song which not only raised their own popularity, but helped increase awareness for the then-new group Trébol Clan. They released a final album, Season Finale, which featured some of their greatest hits. After nearly a decade of working together, a public controversy between themselves fueled the duo's separation; Hector, being perceived as "disloyal", had publicly insinuated that Tito was "gay" and dressed "effeminately" during one of their live concerts, something which deeply bothered Tito.

=== 2004–2006: Solo career and Top of the Line ===
After much delay, Tito's debut solo album, Top of the Line, was released. The album was a hit, topping both the Puerto Rican and the US Latin Rhythm Albums charts, and peaking at No. 3 on Billboard’s Top Latin Albums chart.

Top of the Line featured 20 new songs, among them many collaborations with other artists, including Daddy Yankee, Don Omar and Beenie Man. The album spawned a number of hits, such as "Caile", "Mía" (feat. Daddy Yankee), "Tu Cintura" (feat. Don Omar), "Flow Natural" (feat. Beenie Man and Deevani), "Secreto", "Máximo", "Tuve Que Morir" and "Me Da Miedo", among others.

Top of the Line: El Internacional is a limited edition of the album Top of the Line, with five bonus songs not included on the original version, "Siente El Boom (Remix)", "Enamorado", "Calentándote", "Bailarlo" and "Voy a Mí". The lead single off the album was "Siente El Boom (Remix)", which was a hit in Argentina. "Siente El Boom" was also included on Chosen Few II: El Documental (2006) featuring Randy; for Tito's record Top of The Line: El Internacional, the remix features Randy, along with his partner Jowell, and De La Ghetto. The second single, "Enamorado", did not receive as much promotion or airplay as "Siente El Boom" but was still a hit on Puerto Rico's radio stations. "Siente El Boom" became more popular throughout Latin America, peaking at No. 14 on the Billboard Hot Latin Songs chart. Subsequently, "Enamorado" was cancelled for release, with "Bailarlo" being chosen for a single.

=== 2007–2008: It's My Time ===
It's My Time is the second album by Tito "El Bambino", and was released on October 2, 2007. The record was a success, charting at No. 50 on the mainstream Billboard 200 albums chart and topping the US Top Latin Albums chart. The first single, "Solo Dime que Sí", received notable airplay on the radio. The artists featured on the album include R.K.M & Ken-Y (on "Fans"), Pharrell ("Booty"), Toby Love ("La Busco"), Jadiel ("Sol, Playa y Arena", with Arcángel and Franco "El Gorila" on a remix), Olga Tañón ("En la disco" and remix, and "El Tra").

=== 2009–2010: El Patrón ===
El Patrón (2009), Tito's third solo effort, is one of his most successful albums, reaching the top of the Mexican and Venezuelan charts, as well as peaking at No. 10 on the mainstream US Billboard 200, a primarily English-language chart. The album also peaked at No. 1 on the US Top Latin Albums chart and No. 2 on the US Top Rap Albums chart. The hit "Vamos Pa'l Agua" was released as the lead single, although it was ultimately not included on the actual album. The album includes fellow reggaetón artists Zion y Lennox and Plan B. Successful chart-toppers from the record included "El Amor" and "Under", which also have popular music videos. "El Amor" was officially remixed four times, with four different artists (Yolandita Monge, Jenni Rivera, Chiky Flow, and La India).

In February 2011, Tito approached producer duo group GrüvStar to compose a dance remix of the song "Llueve El Amor".

=== 2011–2012: El Patrón: Invencible ===
His younger brother now known in his disc, "Invencible", by his artist name, Emanuel El Bambi. Tito has said that he will still be doing this type of music 10 years from now.

=== 2012–2013: Invicto ===
On May 26, 2012, Tito released the first promotional single of the album called "Dame La Ola", and a month after, he released the video of this single. In October, Tito released "Por Qué Les Mientes", a duet with Marc Anthony, as the single for his new album. On November 19, 2012, he released his new album Invicto, and on the same day, Tito also released the music video for "Por Qué Les Mientes".

=== 2014–2020: Alta Jerarquía ===
On November 24, 2014, Tito released his sixth studio album titled Alta Jerarquía, of which three singles were released: "A Que No Te Atreves", "Controlando" and "Adicto a Tus Redes". On March 13, 2015, performed a successful concert at the José Miguel Agrelot Coliseum in Puerto Rico, along with numerous singers, intended to promote his album. In 2020 he released a song "Mueve La Cintura" feat. Guru Randhawa and Pitbull.

=== 2020–present: El Muñeco ===
On December 16, 2020, Tito released his seventh studio album titled El Muñeco, of which two singles were released: "I Love You" featuring Jay Wheeler and "Por Ti" featuring Lenny Tavarez.

== Discography ==
- Top of the Line (2006)
- It's My Time (2007)
- El Patrón (2009)
- Invencible (2011)
- Invicto (2013)
- Alta Jerarquía (2014)
- El Muñeco (2020)
- La Gente del Patrón (2025)
