= Chosen Few II: El Documental =

Compilation album by Boy Wonder
- Released: November 14, 2006
- Genre: Reggaeton
- Label: EMI Televisa Music

The compilation album Chosen Few II: El Documental, consists of two discs with 17 tracks each, produced by EMI Televisa Music and released in 2006.

== Track listing ==
Disc One: Classics

1. This Is the Chosen Few - Boy Wonder, Divino, Zion & Lennox, Yaga & Mackie, Julio Voltio, TNT, LDA, Don Omar, Amaro, Plan B, Bimbo, Cheka, Don Dinero, Jowell & Randy, Ro-K, Getto, Reychesta Secret Weapon, Varón, Chingo Bling, Notch
2. Ooh Ahh - L.D.A
3. Hello Mama - Hector "El Father" feat. Yomo
4. Atrevete - Wisin & Yandel feat. Franco "El Gorila"
5. Una Mano Lava la Otra - Pitbull feat. Alexis & Fido
6. Frikitona - Plan B
7. Te Invitan al Party - L.D.A feat. Zion & Lennox
8. No Voy a Parar - Jowell y Randy
9. Intro - Alejandro Sanz
10. No Es lo Mismo - Alejandro Sanz feat. Getto
11. Mambo - Baby Ranks
12. Me Encanta - Angel Doze
13. Pase Lo Que Pase - Getto
14. Uh-Oh - Angel & Khriz
15. Vente Conmigo - Fuego
16. No Me Digas Que Debo Hacer - Reychesta Secret Weapon
17. Right Through - Manny Montes

Disc Two: More Classics

1. Quiero Conocerte - R.K.M & Ken-Y
2. Siente El Boom - Tito "El Bambino" feat. Randy
3. Al Suelo - Yaviah
4. Yo Soy el Mejor - Arcángel & De La Ghetto
5. Te Va Llegar Tu Hora - N.O.R.E. feat. Big Mato
6. Se Te Nota - Amaro feat. Chencho
7. Dejame Hacerlo - Trebol Clan
8. Intro - Stef la Kallejera
9. Real Latinas - Mala Rodriguez, Orquidea Negra, La Bruja, Camil Y Ari Puelo
10. Tu Me Entiendes - Getto
11. Aqui Me Quedo - Notch
12. Tu Tienes Que Entender - Joseph
13. Me Gustan Todas (Chosen Few Remix) - Fuego feat. Reychesta Secret Weapon
14. Revelacion (Chosen Few Remix) - Tempo feat. Getto & Reychesta Secret Weapon
15. Hoy (Chosen Few Remix) - LDA feat. Cheka
16. Frikitona (Chosen Few Remix) - Plan B feat. Trick Daddy, Trina, LDA
17. Reggaeton Latino (Chosen Few Remix) - Don Omar feat. N.O.R.E., Fat Joe, L.D.A

== Awards and nominations ==
- Lo Nuestro Award for Urban Album of the Year (nominated).

== Sales and certifications ==
Region	Certification	Certified units/sales
United States (RIAA)	2× Platinum (Latin)	200,000^{^}
^{^} Shipments figures based on certification alone.
