= Boy Wonder (music producer) =

American record producer (born 1978)

- Also known as: Chosen Few
- Born: Manuel Alejandro Ruiz; May 17, 1978 (age 48); Brooklyn, New York, US
- Origin: Long Island City, Queens, US
- Genres: Merengue, Reggaeton, Latin pop, Urban
- Occupation: Producer
- Instrument: Mixer
- Years active: 2003–present
- Label: Chosen Few Emerald Entertainment, Inc.
- Website: chosenfewurbano.com

Manuel Alejandro Ruiz (born May 17, 1978), better known by his stage names Boy Wonder and Chosen Few, is an American record producer, and CEO of his record label Chosen Few Emerald Entertainment, Inc.

He was born to a Dominican father and Puerto Rican mother in Brooklyn, New York and raised in Long Island City, Queens, where he became interested in music. He has worked with J Balvin, Farruko, Daddy Yankee, Wisin, Yandel, Pitbull and Jon Z.

== Musical career ==
Boy Wonder has made documentaries, compilation albums, soundtracks, and individual Chosen Few artists albums; mostly in the reggaeton and Latin/Urbano Tropical musical genres.

In 2003, Boy Wonder's first project, Chosen Few: El Documental, highlighted the underground Reggaeton movement showcasing the overall sense of the culture with footage of packed concert halls, interviews with top artists of the genre, and much more. Chosen Few El Documental (CD / DVD) Won the 2004 Latin Billboard Award for Best Latin Compilation of the Year and went multi-platinum certified by the RIAA, which included the hit "Reggaeton Latino" by Don Omar, which been documented as the 2nd biggest crossover track in reggaeton history (2nd to Daddy Yankee "Gasolina"). "Reggaeton Latino" spent 44 weeks on the Billboard charts.

In 2005, together with Chencho from reggaeton duo Plan B they both came up with the idea for an underground compilation album (El Draft 2005) created for a competition to find the next reggaeton star. The winner of the talent search was reggaeton duo RKM y Ken-Y but the compilation album also launched the careers of Jowell y Randy and the unknown Fuego with his song "Me Gustan Todas." Boy Wonder signed Fuego to his Chosen Few label upon seeing his underlying talent. Adding Fuego to Chosen Few's lineup of artists including LDA who appeared on the "Reggaeton Latino" Remix and were the first reggaeton male/female duo, Reychesta "Secret Weapon" formerly of the group Tres Coronas, and Puerto Rican a Puerto Rican singer Getto.

In 2006, Boy Wonder released Chosen Few II: El Documental, which captured the rise of reggaeton's second generation. According to Billboard magazine Chosen Few II: El Documental went double platinum and spent months in the Top 5 of Billboard charts Latin sales chart.

In 2008, Boy Wonder released another documental Chosen Few III: The Movie.

== Remix producer ==
One of Boy Wonders' first successful projects was the remix of Shakira's "Mi Vida". It became an underground smash hit. Boy Wonder's hip-hop infused remix to the reggaeton anthem "Reggaeton Latino" was a worldwide hit and featured Don Omar, Fat Joe, N.O.R.E., and LDA. Boy Wonder was responsible for the 2007 remix of the reggaeton hip-hop "Frikitona" featuring Plan B, Trick Daddy, Trina, and LDA. In 2008 Boy Wonder's artist Fuego scored his first big hit "Mi Alma Se Muere" which was the lead single to Chosen Few III: The Movie "Mi Alma Se Muere" remix featuring Pitbull & Omega "El Fuerte" was released later that year, The remix peaked at No. 22 for over 24 weeks on the Top 100 Billboards Tropical.

== Independent productions ==
In August 2010, Boy Wonder executive produced with creative direction Fuego's debut album La Musica Del Futuro. In the summer of 2009 "Super Estrella" featuring Omega "El Fuerte" was released and was the first single off La Musica Del Futuro. A video for "Super Estrella" was shot in the Dominican Republic. In Dec. 2009 Fuego's second single was released "Que Buena Tu Ta" featuring Deevani, which combines Indian rhythms and Latin Mambo beats and peaked at No.2 on the Top 100 Billboard Tropical charts for 12 weeks and in 2010 two remixes were produced by Boy Wonder, one featuring Serani and a Dominican version featuring Mozart La Para, Black Point, Sensato, Los Pepes, Monkey Black & Villanosam.

In July 2010, Boy Wonder worked with MetroPCS to sponsor Fuego's La Musica Del Futuro album release tour. "MetroPCS presents Chosen Few's Fuego: La Musica Del Futuro Album Release Tour." The tour took Boy Wonder and Fuego to 13 cities around the United States promoting MetroPCS's Mister Cartoon Samsung Messager limited edition phone. Boy Wonder worked with MetroPCS to showcase the Mister Cartoon phone in Fuego's third single, "Ya Te Olvide" a merengue-infused beat. The video also features appearances by actor Luis Guzmán and Boy Wonder, and co-stars Rosa Acosta and Tammy Torres.

In late August 2010, Boy Wonder and Fuego continued touring and performed at 1800 411 Pain events throughout Florida and Massachusetts.

In February 2011, Fuego was nominated for the Premio Lo Nuestro 2011 in the category Revelación del Año Urbano. Boy Wonder worked with Univision Television to have Fuego perform, close the show and bring special guest Omega "El Fuerte". Boy Wonder performed on stage as the bartender during Fuego's performance.

That same year Chosen Few Emerald Entertainment, Inc. was nominated for a Latin Billboard Music Award for Best Latin Albums Rhythm Label of the Year.

After the success of Fuego, in April 2011 Boy Wonder set out to find the next Chosen Few Urbano superstar Chiko Swagg, who was guaranteed a spot on Boy Wonder's album Chosen Few Urbano "El Journey" that was released in 2012. Chiko Swagg was signed to Chosen Few prior to the release of the album in 2011.

"Chosen Few Urbano - "El Journey" is a documentary project with accompanying soundtrack that is planned to explore the United States and international Urbano movement. The documentary is planned to use a mixture of urbano music including culture, rhythms, and beats that each artist shares in this documentary. Many very well known artists are planned to present their music, their country, and their overall Urbano culture. Artists from countries such as Puerto Rico, Dominican Republic, Panama, Cuba, USA, Argentina, Venezuela, Canada, & Colombia are scheduled to be featured in the project.

"Chosen Few Urbano" features Urbano artists from around the world including Fuego, USA; Omega "El Fuerte", Dominican Republic; Cosculluela, Puerto Rico; Chino & Nacho, Venezuela; J Balvin, Colombia; Flex, Panama, Jowell y Randy, Puerto Rico; Dyland y Lenny, Puerto Rico; Alex Kayza, Puerto Rico; De La Ghetto, Puerto Rico; Arcangel, Puerto Rico; Farruko, Puerto Rico; La Gente de Zona, Cuba; NY Mets baseball player Jose Reyes, Dominican Republic; Villanosam, Dominican Republic; Fito Blanko, Canada; Black Point, Dominican Republic; and Sensato del Patio, Dominican Republic.

In August 2011, Boy Wonder signed Jenny la Sexy Voz. She is featured on the lead single of Latin Girl Presented by Chosen Few Urbano also featuring Omega "El Fuerte" and Cosculluela and is featured in the 2011 Jowell y Randy Chosen Few remix of "Perrame".

In January 2016, Boy Wonder signed Jon Z & Papi Wilo. He intends to go on tour with them starting next month in South American countries like Ecuador, Colombia, Etc.

== Discography ==
- Chosen Few Emerald Entertainment, Inc.
- The Wonder Boy

With Chosen Few

- 2004: Chosen Few I: El Documental
- 2005: El Draft 2005
- 2006: Chosen Few II: El Documental
- 2007: Chosen Few: Remix Classicos
- 2008: Chosen Few III: The Movie
- 2009: LDA "Revolucionando el Género"
- 2010: Fuego "La Música del Futuro"
- 2012: Chosen Few Urbano: "El Journey"
- 2013: Chosen Few Urbano: "Continues"
- 2015: Chosen Few Urbano: "RD"
