= Masterpiece Commemorative Edition =

Masterpiece "Commemorative Edition"

Compilation album by R.K.M & Ken-Y
- Released: April 3, 2007
- Recorded: 2006–2007
- Genre: Reggaeton
- Label: Pina Records
- Producer: Mambo Kingz; Los Magnificos; Myztiko; Nesty

R.K.M & Ken-Y chronology
Masterpiece (2006)	Masterpiece "Commemorative Edition" (2007)	The Royalty/La Realeza (2008)

Singles from Masterpiece: Commemorative Edition
- 1. "Down (Remix)" Released: 2007; 2. "Oh Oh, ¿Porqué Te Están Velando?" Released: 2007; 3. "Llorarás" Released: June 5, 2007

Masterpiece "Commemorative Edition" is a re-edition of the debut album Masterpiece by reggaeton duo R.K.M & Ken-Y. It was released on April 3, 2007. The Commemorative Edition reached #4 on the Top Latin Albums chart.

== Track listing ==
=== Disc 1 - CD ===
1. Oh Oh, ¿Porqué Te Están Velando?
2. Dame Lo Que Quiero (New Version)
3. Llorarás
4. Te Vas (Remix)
5. Me Matas (Remix) (feat. Daddy Yankee)
6. Yo Te Motivé Mejor Que El
7. Cruz Y Maldición (feat. Nicky Jam)
8. Dime (feat. Pitbull)
9. Down (Remix) (feat. Hector El Father)
10. Igual Que Ayer (New Version)
11. Hoy Te Vi
12. Amigo (New Version)
13. Hey Chula (feat. Carlitos Way)
14. Sueltate (Baby Funk Waxsound Mix)
15. Down (Pop Version)

=== Disc 2 - DVD ===
1. Me Estoy Muriendo
2. Behind The Scenes (Part 1)
3. MasterPiece World Tour (EPK)
4. Behind Masterpiece World Tour
5. Pasado (feat. Nicky Jam)
6. Fuera De Serie (Rep. Dom.) (Live)
7. Lucha Libre
8. Dame Lo Que Quiero (Video Live)
9. Justas 2006 (P.R.) Part 1
10. Down (Original Version)
11. Justas 2006 (P.R.) Part 2
12. Me Matas
13. Justas 2006 (P.R.) Part 3
14. Dime
15. Justas 2006 (P.R.) Last Part
16. Down (Remix) (Premios Juventud 2006)
17. Making Of Llorarás
18. Behind The Scenes (Down Video)
19. Down (Remix) (Hector El Father)
20. Making Of Siguelo Bailando
21. Behind The Scenes (Orlando Magics)
22. Igual Que Ayer

== Charts ==
Chart (2007)	Peak position
US Billboard 200	112
US Top Latin Albums (Billboard)	4
US Latin Rhythm Albums (Billboard)	1

== See also ==
- List of Billboard Latin Rhythm Albums number ones of 2007
