= Llorarás =

Single by R.K.M & Ken-Y

from the album Masterpiece: Commemorative Edition
- Released: June 5, 2007
- Recorded: 2006
- Genre: Contemporary R&B
- Length: 4:01
- Label: Pina Records, Universal Music Latino
- Songwriter(s): Jose Nieves, Kenny Vazquez
- Producer(s): Mambo Kingz

R.K.M & Ken-Y singles chronology
"Igual Que Ayer" (2007)	"Llorarás" (2007)	"Mis Días Sin Ti" (2007)

"Llorarás" (English: You Will Cry) is a song by Puerto Rico reggaetón duo R.K.M & Ken-Y from their first compilation album Masterpiece: Commemorative Edition (2007). It was released as the lead single from the album, which is a re-edition of their debut studio album Masterpiece (2006) when they were still known as Rakim & Ken-Y on June 5, 2007. The song's accompanying music video was released on September 4, 2007, in promotion of the single. The song departs from R.K.M & Ken-Y's musical style of reggaetón which characterized their previous album to explore Contemporary R&B. It reached the Top 10 of the Billboard Hot Latin Songs chart becoming the duo's last single to enter the Billboard Hot Latin Songs chart, until "Te Regalo Amores" a year later. It received an award for "Urban Song of the Year" at the ASCAP Latin Music Awards of 2008. It was later included on the duo's first compilation album The Last Chapter (2010).

== Release and chart performance ==
"Llorarás" was released digitally on June 5, 2007, as the lead single from the album. A bachata version also appears on the release in which R.K.M raps to a rhythm of bachata infused with reggaetón, known as bachaton while Ken-Y sings to bachata. A music video was also released on September 4, 2007, to promote the single. The video was posted to YouTube on November 22, 2009. It has over 17 million views. The song peaked at #9 on the Billboard Hot Latin Songs chart moving seven positions from #16 the week before. It became R.K.M & Ken-Y's last single to enter the Billboard Hot Latin Songs chart, until "Te Regalo Amores" entered the chart a year later at #37 peaking at #2. It reached #24 on the Billboard Latin Pop Songs chart. The song also managed to reach #5 on the Billboard Latin Rhythm Airplay chart the issue week dated August 11, 2007. The song received an award for "Urban Song of the Year" at the 16th Annual ASCAP Latin Music Awards where the duo also received an award for "Igual Que Ayer".

== Track listing ==
- Digital download
1. "Llorarás" (Album Version) — 4:01
2. "Llorarás" (Bachata Version) — 4:32

== Charts ==
=== Weekly charts ===
Chart (2007)	Position
US Latin Songs (Billboard)	9
US Latin Pop Songs (Billboard)	24
US Latin Rhythm Songs (Billboard)	3

=== Year-end charts ===
Chart (2007)	Position
US Latin Songs (Billboard)	48
US Latin Rhythm Songs (Billboard)	13

== Credits and personnel ==
- Credits adapted from Allmusic
  - R.K.M & Ken-Y — Primary Artist, Vocals
  - Rafael "DJ Rafy" Pabon — Mixing
  - Raphy Pina — Coordination, Executive producer, Mixing, Recording
  - Victor Steven Pina — Promoter
  - Esteban Piñero — Mastering
  - Hiram Villanueva — Photography
