= The Last Chapter (album) =

Compilation album by R.K.M & Ken-Y
- Released: March 30, 2010
- Recorded: 2005–2010
- Genre: Reggaeton
- Label: Pina Records
- Producer: Rafael Pina; Mambo Kingz; Los Magnificos; Myztiko

R.K.M & Ken-Y chronology
Romantico 360°: Live From Puerto Rico (2009)	The Last Chapter (2010)	Forever (2011)

Singles from The Last Chapter
- 1. "Te Amé En Mis Sueños" Released: 2009; 2. "Por Amor a Ti" Released: 2009

The Last Chapter is a compilation album by the reggaeton duo R.K.M & Ken-Y. It includes two previously unreleased tracks including the hit "Te Amé En Mis Sueños" and "Por Amor a Ti". This album was released after five years of the career of R.K.M. & Ken-Y on March 30, 2010. The album reached #11 on the Billboard Top Latin Albums chart.

== Track listing ==
1. Te Amé En Mis Sueños - 4:20
2. Por Amor a Ti - 3:39
3. Igual Que Ayer - 2:55
4. Mi Amor Es Pobre (feat. Tony Dize) - 4:01
5. Me Matas - 3:16
6. Dame Lo Que Quiero - 3:35
7. Un Sueño - 4:05
8. Y Tú No Estás - 3:17
9. Llorarás - 4:01
10. Down (Remix) (feat. Hector El Father) - 3:47
11. Te Regalo Amores - 3:59
12. Cuerpo Sensual (feat. Don Omar) - 3:39
13. Vicio del Pecado (feat. Héctor Acosta "El Torito") - 3:57
14. Cruz y Maldición - 4:05
15. Oh Oh, ¿Por Qué Te Están Velando? - 3:16
16. Mis Dias Sin Ti - 3:55

== Charts ==
Chart (2010)	Peak position
US Top Latin Albums (Billboard)	11
US Latin Rhythm Albums (Billboard)	2
