= Masterpiece: World Tour (Sold Out) =

Live album by R.K.M & Ken-Y
- Released: December 12, 2006
- Recorded: August 18, 2006; José Miguel Agrelot Coliseum (San Juan, Puerto Rico)
- Genre: Reggaeton
- Label: Pina Records
- Producer: Mambo Kingz; Los Magnificos; Myztiko

R.K.M & Ken-Y chronology
Masterpiece (2006)	Masterpiece: World Tour (Sold Out) (2006)	Masterpiece "Commemorative Edition" (2007)

Masterpiece: World Tour (Sold Out) is a live version of the album Masterpiece by R.K.M & Ken-Y. It was released on December 12, 2006 and includes a DVD of the concert in Puerto Rico.

== Track listing ==
No.	Title	Length
1.	"Dame Lo Que Quiero"
2.	"Cruz & Maldición"
3.	"Tú No Estás"
4.	"Un Sueño"
5.	"Sacarte De Mi Mente" (featuring Nicky Jam)
6.	"Pasado" (featuring Nicky Jam)
7.	"Amiga Mía" (Interlude)
8.	"Amiga Mía"
9.	"Dime Que Será" (featuring Cruzito)
10.	"Suéltate" (featuring Cruzito)
11.	"Noche Triste"
12.	"Me Estoy Muriendo"
13.	"Way, Way" (featuring Carlitos Way)
14.	"Dime"
15.	"Igual Que Ayer"
16.	"Adiós"
17.	"Tengo Un Amor" (Remix) (featuring Toby Love)
18.	"Si La Ves" (featuring Pablo Portillo)
19.	"Pablo Portillo" (Interlude)
20.	"Te Quise Olvidar" (featuring Pablo Portillo)
21.	"Down" (Intro)
22.	"Down" (featuring Héctor el Father)
23.	"Me Matas"

== Charts ==
Chart (2006)	Peak Position
US Top Latin Albums (Billboard)	7
US Latin Rhythm Albums (Billboard)	2
US Heatseekers Albums (Billboard)	2
