= El Draft 2005 =

2005 compilation album by various artists

Compilation album by Boy Wonder and Chencho Records
- Released: October 8, 2005
- Recorded: 2004–2005
- Genre: Reggaeton
- Label: Chencho; Boy Wonder

The Draft 2005 is the compilation album by Chencho Records and Boy Wonder.

The production was to bring together reggaeton singers and producers of some seniority who presented and apadrinarían other singers on this album. In this release have come singers like R.K.M & Ken-Y, Jowell & Randy, Guelo Star, John Eric and others.

It peaked on the Top Latin Rhythm Albums chart at #1.

== Track listing ==
1. "Starting Line Up, The" (Various Artists)
2. "Metele Coraje" (Angel Doze)
3. "Mi Senora" (Amaro)
4. "Estoy en Mi Cama" (L.D.A.)
5. "Activo" (Cheka)
6. "Tu No Estas" (R.K.M & Ken-Y)
7. "Fuakata" (John Eric)
8. "Te Conoci" (Guelo Star, DJ Blass)
9. "Siguelo Bailando Solita" (Jowell & Randy)
10. "Así" (Reychesta Secret Weapon)
11. "Descontrolate" (Jomar)
12. "Yo Quiero Ser Tu Hombre" (Kartier)
13. "Ella es Pura" (Varon)
14. "Cuando Te Sienta Sola" (Cari Fresco)
15. "Medicina" (Gemstar-N-Bigmato)
16. "Me Gustan Todas" (Fuego)
17. "Damelo Duro" (Noztra)
18. "Winding Go Down Girl" (Mr. Philips, Rhythm)
19. "Me Estas Tentando" (Chaka Black, Tony Haze)
20. "No Se Traben" (Omawi Bling)
21. "Machucala" (Ruster)
22. "No Digas Que No" (David Di'Ambulante)
23. "Nena" (Duran)
24. "El Preso" (Tres Coronas)
