= Llorar =

Llorar (English: "Cry") may refer to:

- "Llorar" (Aventura song) (2003)
- "Llorar", a song by Jesse & Joy featuring Mario Domm, from the deluxe edition of their album ¿Con Quién Se Queda El Perro? (2012)
- "Llorar", a song by Lucero, from her album Lucero De México (1992)

== See also ==
- "Llorarás", a song by R.K.M & Ken-Y
