= House of Pleasure =

House of Pleasure, a euphemism for a brothel, may refer to:

- House of Pleasure (album), an album by Puerto Rican reggaeton duo Plan B
- House of Pleasure, the English title for 1952 French film Le Plaisir by director Max Ophüls
- House of Pleasure (1969 film), a historical comedy film
- House of Pleasures, better known as House of Tolerance, a 2011 French drama film directed by Bertrand Bonello
