= Es un Secreto =

- Remix version cover

Single by Plan B

from the album House of Pleasure
- Language: Spanish
- Released: April 24, 2011
- Genre: Reggaeton
- Length: 3:09
- Label: Pina; Sony Latin
- Songwriters: Edwin F. Vázquez; Egbert Rosa Cintron; Orlando Javier Valle Vega
- Producer: Haze

Plan B singles chronology
"Si No Le Contesto" (2011)	"Es un Secreto" (2011)	"Automóvil" (remix) (2011)

"Es un Secreto" (transl. "It's a Secret") is a song by the reggaeton duo Plan B. It was released on April 24, 2011, through Pina Records and Sony Music Latin, as the second single from their third studio album, House of Pleasure (2011). A remix version of the song with Tego Calderón was also released in the same year.

== Music video ==
Its music video was released on April 24, 2011, through the YouTube channel of Pina Records.

== Charts ==
2011 weekly chart performance for "Es un Secreto"
Chart (2011)	Peak position
US Latin Digital Song Sales (Billboard)	38
US Latin Rhythm Airplay (Billboard)	23
US Tropical Airplay (Billboard)	16

2023–2026 weekly chart performance for "Es un Secreto"
Chart (2023–2026)	Peak position
Argentina Hot 100 (Billboard)	49
Bolivia (Billboard)	15
Colombia Hot 100 (Billboard)	27
Ecuador (Billboard)	7
Peru (Billboard)	8
Spain (Promusicae)	66

== Certifications ==
Certifications and sales for "Es un Secreto"
Region	Certification	Certified units/sales
Spain (Promusicae)	4× Platinum	240,000^{‡}
^{‡} Sales+streaming figures based on certification alone.
