= The Royalty: La Realeza =

Studio album by R.K.M & Ken-Y
- Released: September 9, 2008
- Recorded: 2007–2008
- Genre: Reggaeton, bachata, Latin pop, merengue
- Length: 57:35
- Label: Pina Records; Machete Music
- Producer: Rafael Pina; Mambo Kingz; Los Magnificos; Haze; Richard Marcell; Polo Parra; Ab Medina

R.K.M & Ken-Y chronology
Masterpiece "Commemorative Edition" (2007)	The Royalty: La Realeza (2008)	Romantico 360°: Live From Puerto Rico (2009)

Singles from The Royalty: La Realeza
- 1. "Mis Días Sin Ti" Released: December 18, 2007; 2. "Te Regalo Amores" Released: August 26, 2008

The Royalty: La Realeza (Nuestra Segunda Obra Maestra) is the second studio album following the success of Masterpiece by R.K.M & Ken-Y. After a 2 1/2-year wait, their album was released on September 9, 2008. The first official single off the album is "Mis Dias Sin Ti" and the song was released on December 18, 2007. The second official single off the album is "Te Regalo Amores" and the song was released on August 26, 2008. The album moved 15,000 copies within the United States during its first week. It received a nomination for Best Latin Urban Album at the Grammy Awards of 2009.

== Track listing ==
#	Title	Translated Name	Featured Guest(s)	Producer(s)	Time
1	La Realeza	The Royalty		Los Magnificos, Haze	2:59
2	Come On	Come On		Los Magnificos & Mambo Kings	2:36
3	No Tengo Nada (Paris)	I Have Nothing (Paris)		Los Magnificos	3:26
4	Tuve Un Sueño	I Had a Dream	Plan B	Los Magnificos, Haze	3:09
5	Puedo Reír	I Can Laugh		Los Magnificos & Mambo Kings	2:59
6	Presiento	I Have a Feeling		Gabriel Cruz, Los Magnificos & Mambo Kings	2:54
7	Te Regalo Amores	I Will Give You Love		Gabriel Cruz, Los Magnificos & Mambo Kings	3:59
8	Cuerpo Sensual	Sensual Body	Don Omar	Los Magnificos & Mambo Kings	3:38
9	Si Tú Me Amaras	If You Loved Me		Los Magnificos & Mambo Kings	3:01
10	Vicio Del Pecado	Vice Of Sin	Héctor Acosta "El Torito"	Los Magnificos, Polo Parra, Juan Luis Guzman, Irving Menendez	3:56
11	Nena Ven Conmigo	Come With Me Girl		Los Magnificos, Haze	3:32
12	Noche de Dos (Ven)	Night of Two (Come)		Los Magnificos & Mambo Kings	2:34
13	Nuestro Amor Se Acaba	Our Love Is Ending		Los Magnificos	3:26
14	Te Amare	I Will Love You	Jayko	Gabriel Cruz & Los Magnificos	4:15
15	Enamorado Por Primera Vez	In Love For The First Time		Los Magnificos	3:46
16	Mis Días Sin Ti	My Days Without You		Los Magnificos	3:55
17	No Puedo	I Can't		Los Magnificos	3:31
18	Te Regalo Amores (Remix)	I Give You Love (Remix)	Ivy Queen	Gabriel Cruz, Los Magnificos & Mambo Kings	3:59

=== iTunes Bonus Track ===
#	Title	Producer(s)	Time
19	Mis Días Sin Ti (Urban Remix) [Bonus Track]	Los Magnificos	3:56
20	Te Amare (Pop Version) [Bonus Track]		4:19

=== Special Edition DVD ===
#	Title	Featured Guest(s)
1	Yo Te Motive	
2	Cruz y Maldicion	
3	Te Vas	
4	Igual Que Ayer	
5	Medley: Si La Ves / Down / Un Sueño	
6	Dame Lo Que Quiero	
7	Me Matas	
8	La Amas Como Yo?	Los Fantasticos Karis
9	Mis Dias Sin Ti	
10	Lloraras	

R.K.M & Ken-Y were awarded a Platinum Album for "The Royalty: La Realeza" at a conference in Miami, Florida. Their album sold more than 200,000 since its release on September 9.

== Charts ==
Chart (2008)	Peak position
US Billboard 200	32
US Top Rap Albums (Billboard)	11
US Top Latin Albums (Billboard)	1
US Latin Rhythm Albums (Billboard)	1

== Sales and certifications ==
Region	Certification	Certified units/sales
United States (RIAA)	Platinum (Latin)	100,000^{^}
^{^} Shipments figures based on certification alone.
