= Love & Sex (album) =

Studio album by Plan B
- Released: August 25, 2014
- Recorded: 2012–14
- Genre: Reggaeton
- Length: 59:54
- Labels: Pina Records, Sony Music Latin
- Producers: Plan B (exec.), Raphy Pina (exec.); Haze, Duran, Luny Tunes, Tainy, DJ Blass, Montana, Fade

Plan B chronology
La Formula (2012)	Love & Sex (2014)

Singles from Love & Sex
- 1. "Zapatito Roto" Released: April 27, 2013; 2. "Candy" Released: September 7, 2013; 3. "Mi Vecinita" Released: July 19, 2014; 4. "Fanática Sensual" Released: September 24, 2014

Love & Sex is the third and final studio album by Puerto Rican reggaeton duo Plan B. It was released on August 25, 2014, through Sony Music Latin and Pina Records. It features four singles: "Zapatito Roto" (featuring Tego Calderón), "Candy", "Mi Vecinita" and "Fanática Sensual". On September 27, 2014, the album reached the #2 position on the US Billboard Top Latin Albums charts. The release was followed by the Love & Sex tour in the United States and Latin America.

== Production ==
According to Chencho (Orlando Valle), Love & Sex is a product of four years of work. The album was titled in reference to fans referring to them as "el dúo del sex" after debuting on DJ Blass' Reggaeton Sex compilation in 2000. Chencho added that they limited the use of explicit words in the album due to an increase in popularity.

At the moment of writing songs, we had to do it in all areas. We evolved on lyrics, the song content, and we searched for a meaning that people can identify with. Maldy and I sat and watched for every detail thinking of our fans. They were four years of sacrifice.

— Chencho, September 2014.

== Singles ==
- «Zapatito Roto» was released as the first single on April 27, 2013. It was produced by Haze and Duran, and features Tego Calderón, being the third time they work together, after the remix of "Pegaito A La Pared" in 2009 and the remix of "Es Un Secreto" in 2011. It does not have an official music video, though there are official audio and lyric videos promoting the album. Combining the views of both videos, the song has over 35 million views on YouTube.
- «Candy» was released as the second and lead single on September 7, 2013. It was produced by Duran and Luny Tunes. The official audio has over 100 million views on YouTube while the music video (released on December 18, 2013) has over 360 million views. It reached the #28 position on US Billboard Tropical Songs charts. There are two official remixes, featuring De La Ghetto and Jowell & Randy in the first one, and Tempo and Arcángel in the second one.
- «Mi Vecinita» was released as the third album single and second lead single on July 19, 2014. It was produced by Haze and DJ Blass, and mixes reggaeton and argentine cumbia. The lyric video has over 15 million views, while the music video (released on September 9, 2014) has over 450 million views. It reached the #6 position on US Billboard Tropical Songs charts.
- «Fanática Sensual» was released as the fourth album single and third lead single on September 24, 2014. It was produced by Haze and Duran. The lyric video has over 320 million views, while the music video has over 400 million views on YouTube. It reached the top position on US Billboard Tropical Songs charts and was the most successful single release of the album, peaking at #9 and remaining on the Billboard charts for a total of 63 weeks. An official remix featuring Nicky Jam released on April 29, 2015.

== Critical reception ==
Professional ratings
Review scores
Source	Rating
AllMusic	4/5 stars

David Jeffries from Allmusic said

reggaeton duo Plan B continue to combine the slick and the traditional, making music that appeals to the current club crowd while keeping it simple and avoiding those jacked-in, ultra-pop choruses whenever possible. Still, singles like "Candy" and collaborations with Tego Calderón ("Zapatito Roto") and Yandel ("Pa'l Piso") are as big as they need to be, so think of 50 Cent's G-Unit crew when it comes to Plan B's perfect balance of the street-worthy and the radio-worthy. Love & Sex continues this legacy, although all the swagger and all the thrills found within suggest that the album's title was printed backwards.

The album was in Billboard magazine's staff-picked "50 Best Latin Albums of the Decade" list in 2019.

== Track listing ==
No.	Title	Writer(s)	Producer(s)	Length
1.	"Fronteo"	Orlando Valle, Edwin Vázquez, Marco Masis	Duran, Tainy	3:24
2.	"Choca"	O. Valle, E. Vázquez, Francisco Saldaña, Victor Cabrera	Luny Tunes	3:42
3.	"Pa'l Piso" (featuring Yandel)	O. Valle, E. Vázquez, Llandel Veguilla, Egbert Rosa	Haze, Mr. Earcandy	4:07
4.	"Fanática Sensual"	O. Valle, E. Vázquez, E. Rosa, David Duran	Haze, Duran	4:01
5.	"El Matadero" (featuring Alexis & Fido)	O. Valle, E. Vázquez, Joel Martínez, Raúl Ortíz, E. Rosa	Haze, Duran	3:56
6.	"No Quiero Que Te Vayas"	O. Valle, E. Vázquez, E. Rosa, D. Duran	Haze, Duran	3:47
7.	"Mi Vecinita"	O. Valle, E. Vázquez, E. Rosa, Vladimir Félix	Haze, Duran, DJ Blass	3:03
8.	"Juegas Con Mi Mente" (featuring J Alvarez)	O. Valle, E. Vázquez, Javid Álvarez, Alberto Lozada	Montana	3:19
9.	"¿Dónde Los Consigo?" (featuring Yailemm & Clandestino)	O. Valle, E. Vázquez	Duran, Fade	4:26
10.	"Soy Y Seré"	O. Valle, E. Vázquez, E. Rosa	Haze	3:36
11.	"Coquetea"	O. Valle, E. Vázquez, M. Masis	Duran, Tainy, Nely	2:48
12.	"Zapatito Roto" (featuring Tego Calderón)	O. Valle, E. Vázquez, Tegui Calderón, E. Rosa	Haze, Duran	3:50
13.	"Dame Una Noche" (featuring Zion & Lennox)	O. Valle, E. Vázquez, Félix Ortíz, Gabriel Pizarro, M. Masis	Tainy	4:15
14.	"Candy"	O. Valle, E. Vázquez, F. Saldaña, V. Cabrera	Duran, Luny Tunes	3:28
15.	"Sátiro" (featuring Amaro)	O. Valle, E. Vázquez, Emmanuel Amaro, F. Saldaña, V. Cabrera	Duran, Luny Tunes	4:09
16.	"Love And Sex"	O. Valle, E. Vázquez, F. Saldaña, V. Cabrera	Duran, Luny Tunes	4:03
Total length:				59:54

Remixes
No.	Title	Writer(s)	Producer(s)	Length
1.	"Candy" (featuring De La Ghetto and Jowell & Randy)	O. Valle, E. Vázquez, Rafael Castillo, Joel Muñóz, Randy Ortíz, F. Saldaña, V. Cabrera	Duran, Luny Tunes, DJ Blass	4:21
2.	"Candy" (featuring Tempo and Arcángel)	O. Valle, E. Vázquez, David Sánchez, Austin Santos, F. Saldaña, V. Cabrera	Duran, Luny Tunes	4:21
3.	"Fanática Sensual" (featuring Nicky Jam)	O. Valle, E. Vázquez, Nick Rivera, E. Rosa, D. Duran	Haze, Duran	4:26

== Personnel ==
Some credits adapted from AllMusic.

- Alexis – featured artist
- Ana J. Alvarado – production coordination
- J Alvarez – featured artist
- Víctor Cabrera – musical producer, producer
- Tego Calderón – featured artist
- ClanDestino – featured artist
- Andres Coll – label manager
- David Duran – mezcla, producer
- Fade – musical producer
- Vladimir Felix – musical producer
- Fido – featured artist
- Lennox – featured artist
- Alberto "Montana" Lozada – musical producer
- Marcos "Tainy" Masis – cmusical producer, producer
- Rafael Pina – executive producer, mezcla
- Plan B – primary artist
- Egbert "Haze" Rosa – musical producer, producer
- Francisco Saldaña – mezcla, producer
- Edwin Vázquez Vega – executive producer
- Orlando J. Valle Vega "Chencho" – executive producer
- Yaileem – featured artist
- Yandel – featured artist
- Zion – featured artist

== Charts ==
=== Weekly charts ===
Chart (2014)	Peak position
US Billboard 200	89
US Top Latin Albums (Billboard)	2
US Latin Rhythm Albums (Billboard)	1
US Top Rap Albums (Billboard)	8

=== Year-end charts ===
Chart (2014)	Position
US Top Latin Albums (Billboard)	43
Chart (2015)	Position
US Top Latin Albums (Billboard)	33

=== Songs ===
Year	Single	Peak positions						
Year	Single	US Latin Airplay	US Latin Digital Songs	US Latin Pop Songs	US Hot Latin Songs	US Latin Streaming Songs	US Tropical Songs	US Latin Rhythm
2014	"Candy"	-	30	-	30	-	28	-
2015	"Choca"	30	-	33	22	-	-	-
2015	"Pa'l Piso"	-	-	-	-	-	-	18
2015	"Fanática Sensual"	9	9	18	3	7	1	-
2015	"Mi Vecinita"	22	33	11	19	-	6	-
