= Reggaeton de Markesina =

Compilation album by Maldy
- Released: 2007
- Recorded: 2007
- Genre: Reggaeton

Reggaeton de Markesina is a compilation album by Maldy of the duo Plan B.

== Track listing ==
#	Title	Performers	Length
1	Intro	Maldy	2:09
2	Reggaeton De Markesina	Plan B, Blak Label, Master Joe, Don Chezina, Jenny, Tommy Viera, Nano MC, Speedy, Lennox, Great Kilo & Jason	5:24
3	Si Eres Freak	Plan B	2:51
4	Mi Bailarina	Maldy featuring Speedy	2:30
5	Bum Bum	Maldy featuring Jason	3:08
6	Tocala	Maldy featuring Don Chezina	3:20
7	Masoquismo	Maldy featuring Lito MC Cassidy	3:11
8	Picheale	Maldy featuring Arcángel	2:38
9	Bubble Gum	Maldy featuring Opi	2:17
10	La Chica De Mi Barrio	Maldy featuring Tommy Viera	3:20
11	Get Down	Maldy featuring Delirious	3:52
12	Reggaeton En La Markesina	Maldy featuring Lennox & Nano MC	3:23
13	La Pista Esta Llenisima	Maldy featuring Opi & Jason	3:36
14	Me Tienes Loco	Speedy & Michiland	3:49
15	Mi Furia Bestial	Maldy	3:20
16	Navegar	Randy Nota Loka & Amaro	4:46
17	Bow Bow	Maldy & Blak Label	2:52
