= Forever (R.K.M & Ken-Y album) =

Studio album by R.K.M & Ken-Y
- Released: February 15, 2011
- Recorded: 2010–2011
- Genres: Reggaeton, Latin pop, reggae, R&B
- Label: Pina Records
- Producers: Raphy Pina (exec.); Eliel (also exec.); Los Magnificos (co. executive); Mambo Kingz

R.K.M & Ken-Y chronology
The Last Chapter (2010)	Forever (2011)	La Formula (2012)

Singles from Forever
- 1. "Más" Released: 2010; 2. "Mi Corazon Está Muerto" Released: 2011

Forever is the third studio album by the reggaeton duo R.K.M & Ken-Y. It was released on February 15, 2011, and entered the Billboard Top Latin Albums chart at number 10.

Two singles were released from the album. "Mi Corazón Está Muerto" peaked at number 18 on the Billboard Top Latin Songs chart, and at number 23 on the Billboard Top Latin Pop Songs chart. "Mas" peaked at number 36 on the Billboard Latin Pop Songs chart

== Track listing ==
1. "Forever" - 4:39
2. "Quédate Junto A Mi" - 4:47
3. "De Rodillas" (Ken-Y) - 3:01
4. "Mi Corazón Está Muerto" - 3:59
5. "Más" - 3:33
6. "A Ella Le Gusta El Dembow" (featuring Zion & Lennox) - 3:45
7. "Te Amo" - 3:25
8. "No Vuelvas" - 3:50
9. "Prefiero Morir" (Ken-Y) - 4:36
10. "El Party Sigue" (24/7) (featuring Alexis & Fido) - 4:12
11. "Goodbye" - 3:44
12. "Yo Sé" (Ken-Y featuring Arthur Hanlon) - 3:36
13. "Te Doy Una Rosa" - 3:24
14. "Regalo De Quinceañera" (Ken-Y) - 4:17
15. "Prefiero Morir (Remix)" - 3:53
16. "No Vuelvas (Remix)" featuring Zion & Lennox - 4:32

== Personnel ==
- Label Manager - Alex Rodriguez
- Publishing - Ana Alvarado
- Marketing - Andres Coll
- Congas - Angel Rodriguez
- Featured Artist - Arthur Hanlon
- Mezcla - Bob St. John
- Production Assistant - Carolina Aristizabal
- Booking - Cristina Ramos
- Tambora - Darío del Rosario
- Engineer, Vocal Coach - David Duran
- Engineer, Vocal Coach - Eduardo "Edup" Del Pilar
- Photography - Edwin David
- Producer - Eliel Lind Osorio
- Design - Eric Daulet
- Composer - Felix "Zion" Ortiz
- Composer - Gabriel Pizarro
- Design - Iancarlo Reyes
- Coros - Irelys González
- Assistant Engineer - Izzy Maccio
- Composer - Joel Martinez
- Booking - John Rodriguez
- Booking - Jorge Pulecio
- Saxophone - Jorge Vizcarrondo
- Composer - Jose Nieves
- Engineer - Juan Cristobal Losada
- Composer, Producer - Karl Palencia
- Coros, Producer - Ken-Y
- Composer - Kenny Vazquez
- Arreglos, Piano, Producer - Kervin Lebrón
- Bateria - Ledif Franceschini
- Featured Artist - Lennox
- Coros - Lili Gascot
- Producer - Los Magnificos
- Mastering - Michael Fuller
- Composer, Engineer, Executive Producer, Mixing, Producer, Vocal Coach - Rafael Pina
- Guira - Rafael Torres
- Composer - Raul "Alexis" Ortiz
- Engineer, Producer, Vocal Coach - Richard Marcell
- Primary Artist - RKM & Ken-Y
- Booking - Sandy De Los Santos
- Production Assistant - Steven "Kruz" Rivera

== Charts ==
Chart (2011)	Peak position
US Top Latin Albums (Billboard)	10
US Latin Rhythm Albums (Billboard)	3
US Top Rap Albums (Billboard)	23
