= El Mundo del Plan B =

2002 studio album by Plan B

El Mundo del Plan B: Los Que la Montan

Studio album by Plan B
- Released: October 17, 2002
- Recorded: 2002
- Genre: Reggaeton
- Length: 45:26
- Label: Genio Records; One Star Distributors
- Producer: DJ Blass; DJ Joe; DJ Wassie; Geniokil@

Plan B chronology
El Mundo del Plan B: Los Que la Montan (2002)	Los Nenes del Blin Blin (2005)

El Mundo del Plan B: Los Que la Montan (English: The World of Plan B: The One's Who Get It Done) is the debut studio album by Puerto Rican duo Plan B. It features many collaborations with reggaeton artists.

== Track listing ==
Credits adapted from Apple Music.

No.	Title	Length
1.	"Intro (El Duo del Sex)"	2:40
2.	"Mencionando tu Nombre"	3:20
3.	"Yo la Tuve"	2:14
4.	"No Voy a Esperar por Ti"	2:31
5.	"Dos Gatas" (with Guelo Star)	2:55
6.	"Me la Explota" (with Daddy Yankee)	3:18
7.	"Hey You Girl"	2:58
8.	"Lento Muévete" (with Dálmata)	2:26
9.	"Gritarás" (with Speedy)	2:10
10.	"El Caballo" (with Ñejo)	3:52
11.	"Tumba el Guille" (with Shaka & Benny)	4:06
12.	"Yal Yal Yal" (with Rey Pirin)	2:26
13.	"Hora de Perrear"	3:59
14.	"La Danza Bella"	3:19
15.	"Mixeo (El Duo del Sex)"	3:06
Total length:		45:26
