= Romantico 360°: Live from Puerto Rico =

Romantico 360°: Live From Puerto Rico

Live album by R.K.M & Ken-Y
- Released: April 14, 2009
- Recorded: 2008
- Genre: Reggaeton
- Label: Pina Records
- Producer: Rafael Pina

R.K.M & Ken-Y chronology
'The Royalty/La Realeza' (2008)	Romantico 360°: Live From Puerto Rico (2009)	'The Last Chapter' (2010)

Romantico 360°: Live From Puerto Rico is the second live album of reggaeton duo R.K.M & Ken-Y. It was released on April 14, 2009.

== Track listing ==
CD 1:

1. Yo Te Motivé Mejor Que El
2. Cruz y Maldición
3. Duele (feat. Tito El Bambino)
4. Fans (feat. Tito El Bambino)
5. Te Vas
6. En Que Fallamos (feat. Ivy Queen)
7. Igual Que Ayer
8. Si Ya No Estás (feat. N'Klabe)
9. Tu Amor (feat. Arcángel)

CD 2:

1. Bonita (feat. Arcángel)
2. Ton Ton Ton (feat. Nicky Jam)
3. Dame Lo Que Quiero
4. Medley - Si La Ves, Down y Un Sueño
5. La Amas Como Yo (feat. Karis)
6. Me Matas
7. Yo Te Quiero (feat. Wisin & Yandel)
8. Sexy Movimiento (feat. Wisin & Yandel)
9. Mis Dias Sin Ti
