= Los Nenes del Blin Blin =

2005 mixtape by Plan B

Mixtape by Plan B
- Released: 2005
- Genres: Reggaeton; hip hop
- Labels: Chencho; Maldy
- Producer: Plan B

Plan B chronology
El Mundo del Plan B: Los Que la Montan (2002)	Los Nenes del Blin Blin (2005)	House of Pleasure (2010)

Los Nenes del Blin Blin is the debut mixtape by Puerto Rican duo Plan B. It was named after some of the nicknames of Chencho and Maldy. The album was never officially released, and they dropped a demo album which was free.

== Track listing ==
No.	Title	Length
1.	"Intro: Toma Perreo" (with Amaro)
2.	"Frikitona"
3.	"Temprano"
4.	"Guatagato" (with Carifresco)
5.	"Te Ando Buscando" (featuring Maicol y Manuel)
6.	"Ya Regresé" (with Amaro)
7.	"Plan B Mix"
8.	"Rebulera de Amor" (with Amaro)
9.	"Suave" (with Amaro)
