= House of Pleasure (album) =

Studio album by Plan B
- Released: July 20, 2010
- Recorded: 2009–2010
- Genre: Reggaeton
- Labels: Pina Records; Sony Music Latin
- Producers: Raphy Pina; Haze; DJ Blass; Nely "El Alma Secreta"; Mambo Kingz; DJ Duran (The Coach); Los Magnificos

Plan B chronology
Los Nenes del Blin Blin (2005)	House of Pleasure (2010)	La Formula (2012)

Singles from "House Of Pleasure"
- 1. "Si No Le Contesto" Released: March 16, 2010; 2. "Es un Secreto" Released: February 1, 2011

House Of Pleasure is the second studio album by reggaeton duo Plan B. It was released on July 20, 2010 through Sony Music Latin and Pina Records. It features two singles: the lead, "Si No Le Contesto" and "Es un Secreto". "Si No Le Contesto" peaked at #37 on the Billboard Hot Latin Songs chart.

== Track listing ==
1. "Intro"
2. "Tarde en la Noche"
3. "¿Por Qué Te Demoras?"
4. "La Nena de Papi" (featuring Tito El Bambino)
5. "Si No Le Contesto"
6. "Es un Secreto"
7. "El Amor No Existe"
8. "Lloras" (featuring R.K.M & Ken-Y)
9. "Nos Fuimos Discoteca"
10. "Partysera" (featuring De La Ghetto)
11. "El Que la Hace la Paga"
12. "Mis Canciones Hablan de Sexo" (featuring J-King & Maximan)
13. "¿Qué Me Paso?"
14. "House of Pleasure"
15. "Outro"

== Charts ==
Chart (2010)	Peak position
US Top Latin Albums	18
US Top Latin Rhythm Albums	3
US Top Heatseekers Albums	3

== Music videos ==
- Si No Le Contesto
- Es un Secreto
