= Te Regalo Amores =

Single by R.K.M & Ken-Y

from the album The Royalty: La Realeza
- Released: August 26, 2008
- Recorded: 2008
- Genre: Latin pop, Cumbia, Merengue
- Length: 3:59
- Label: Pina Records, Machete Music
- Songwriters: Jose Nieves, Kenny Vazquez
- Producers: Los Magnificos, Mambo Kingz, Janet Santiago

R.K.M & Ken-Y singles chronology
"Mis Días Sin Ti" (2007)	"Te Regalo Amores" (2008)	"Más" (2010)

Audio sample
- A 28 second sample of "Te Regalo Amores" featuring the remix version with part of Ivy Queen's verse, the chorus performed by Ken-Y, and part of R.K.M's verse.: file; help

"Te Regalo Amores" (English: I'll Give You Love) is a song by Puerto Rican reggaeton duo R.K.M & Ken-Y from their second studio album The Royalty: La Realeza (2008). It was written by Jose Nieves and Kenny Vazquez, produced by Los Magnificos, Mambo Kings, and Janet Santiago and released as the second single from the album on August 26, 2008. A remix version with Ivy Queen was recorded and also included on the album. The song is a mixture of Cumbia and Merengue to create a lighter Latin pop sound.

The song's accompanying music video was released on September 26, 2008. It features a telenovela type setting and plot. It has attained over ten million views. The music video to remix version was released on November 26, 2008. It features Queen, as she appears and performs her verses. Queen's remix has attained over 100 million views.

== Song information and composition ==
"Te Regalo Amores" was written by Jose Nieves and Kenny Vazquez, the duo known artistically as R.K.M & Ken-Y. It was produced by the Puerto Rican reggaetón production duo Mambo Kingz who also produced "Come On", "Puedo Reír", "Presiento", "Cuerpo Sensual", "Si Tú Me Amaras", and "Noche de Dos (Ven)" from the album. The song is a blend of Cumbia and Merengue to form a more lighter Latin pop sound. A remix version with Puerto Rican singer Ivy Queen was included on the album. A separate remix version with Dominican singer Rubby Perez was included on his 2010 album, Genial. Dominican salsa singer José Alberto "El Canario" recorded his own version of the song which appears on his 2011 album, Original.

== Release and chart performance ==
"Te Regalo Amores" was released on August 26, 2008 by Pina Records. On the Billboard Latin Rhythm Airplay chart, the song debuted at #17 on the week of September 20, 2008. It reached #1 for the week of November 22, 2008 replacing "Dime" by Ivy Queen after her eight-week reign, but was later succeeded by "Dime" a few weeks later. On the Billboard Bubbling Under Hot 100 chart, the song debuted at #23 on the week of November 22, 2008 and peaked #15 for the week of December 27, 2008. On the Billboard Hot Latin Songs chart, the song debuted at #37 and was labeled as "Hot Shot Debut" for the week of September 27, 2008, and peaked at #2 on the week of January 3, 2009. "No Me Doy Por Vencido" by Luis Fonsi kept "Te Regalo Amores" from obtaining the #1 spot. This was R.K.M & Ken-Y's first single to enter the Hot Latin Songs chart since "Lloraras" in June 2007. On the Billboard Latin Pop Airplay chart, the song debuted at #36 on the week of October 11, 2008 and peaked at #5 for the week of January 3, 2009. On the Billboard Latin Tropical Airplay chart, the song debuted at #38 on the week of September 27, 2008. It reached #1 for the week of January 3, 2009 replacing "En Aquel Luga" by Adolescent's Orquesta and was later succeeded by Aventura's "Por Un Segundo".

== Critical reception ==
On the review for the album, Jason Birchmeier of AllMusic commented, On "El Duo Romantico"'s second album, Ken-Y is given much of the spotlight, no surprise given his exceptional popularity. For instance, on the album's standout single, the cumbia-styled "Te Regalo Amores," R.K.M. isn't even heard from until over two minutes into the song, when he breaks into a brief verse that lasts less than 20 seconds and is obscured by a keyboard melody that appears out of nowhere and is so high in the mix, it essentially relegates his rap to background noise. As evidence that not all is fair in the world of R.K.M. & Ken-Y, featured guest Ivy Queen fares better on the album-closing remix of "Te Regalo Amores," where she gets around 30 seconds for her verse and doesn't have to compete with a keyboard melody. Hispanic Television has called the remix with Ivy Queen a classic. At the American Society of Composers, Authors and Publishers Latin awards, the song received an award for Urban Song of the Year.

== Charts ==
=== Weekly charts ===
Chart (2008)	Peak Position
US Bubbling Under Hot 100 (Billboard)	15
US Latin Rhythm Airplay (Billboard)	1
US Venezuela Top Latino (Record Report)	1
Chart (2009)	Peak Position
US Hot Latin Songs (Billboard)	2
US Latin Pop Airplay (Billboard)	5
US Latin Tropical Airplay (Billboard)	1
Chart (2010)	Peak Position
US Tropical Digital Songs (Billboard)	15

=== Year-end charts ===
Chart (2008)	Position
US Latin Rhythm Airplay (Billboard)	21
Chart (2009)	Position
US Hot Latin Songs (Billboard)	16
US Latin Pop Airplay (Billboard)	21
US Latin Tropical Airplay (Billboard)	10
US Latin Rhythm Airplay (Billboard)	6

== See also ==
- List of number-one Billboard Hot Tropical Songs of 2009
- List of Billboard Latin Rhythm Airplay number ones of 2008
- List of Billboard Latin Rhythm Airplay number ones of 2009
