= Damé Lo Que Quiero =

"Dame Lo Que Quiero"

Single by R.K.M & Ken-Y

from the album Masterpiece
- Released: 2006
- Recorded: 2006
- Genre: Reggaeton
- Length: 3:34
- Songwriters: José Nieves (R.K.M); Kenny Vázquez (Ken-Y); Rafael Pina Nieves

R.K.M & Ken-Y singles chronology
"Dame Lo Que Quiero" (2006)	"Down" (2006)

"Dame Lo Que Quiero" ("Give Me What I Want") is the third single released from the debut album by the reggaeton duo R.K.M & Ken-Y, Masterpiece (2006).

== Charts ==
Chart (2006)	Peak position
US Hot Latin Songs (Billboard)	50
US Latin Airplay (Billboard)	50
US Latin Rhythm Airplay (Billboard)	17
