= Fuego (singer) =

American singer

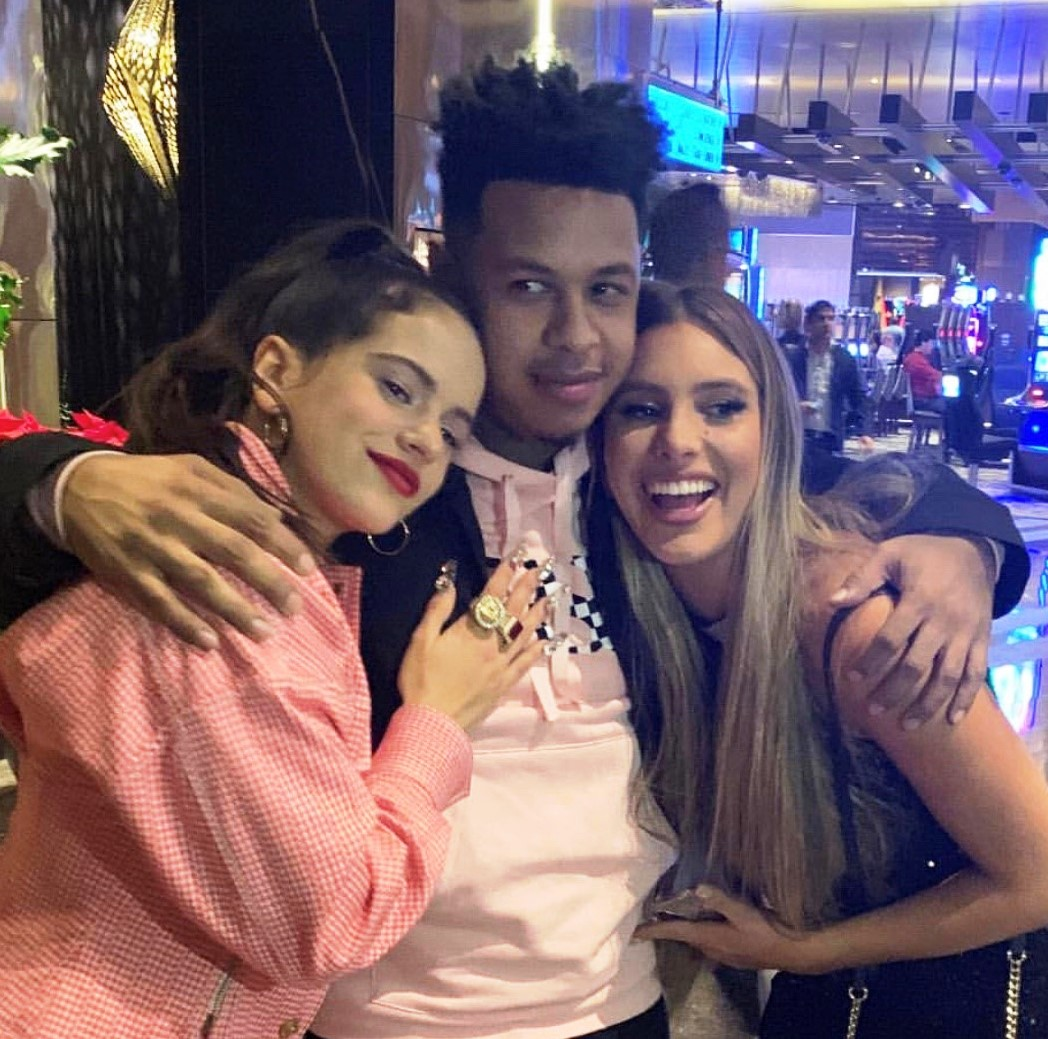
- Fuego with Rosalia (left) and Lele Pons (right) during the 2018 Latin Grammys week in Las Vegas, Nevada.

Background information
- Born: Miguel Ángel Durán Jr. September 24, 1981 (age 45); Washington, D.C., U.S.
- Genres: Merengue; bachata; urban; R&B; Latin trap
- Occupation: Singer
- Instrument: Vocals
- Years active: 2005–present
- Labels: Fireboy Music; Mr. 305 Inc.

Miguel Ángel Durán Jr. (born September 24, 1981) known by his stage name as Fuego ("fire"), is an American singer and founder of Fireboy Music. He is currently signed to Lionfish Entertainment.

== Early life ==
Durán was born to Dominican parents in Washington, D.C., and was raised in Langley Park, Maryland.

His parents sent him to the Dominican Republic, where he and his brother, Rickylindo, attended school for a couple of years. In the late 1990s, Durán formed part of a group called 3men2 (Tremendo) with friends and his brother and performed at local venues. After the group split, Durán met DJ Menace, who founded Migo Productions and booked Fuego shows in the area.

In 2004, Fuego was booked as an opening act to Reggaeton concert at a local night club where Daddy Yankee and Reggaeton Duo Plan B were headlining, He sang "Aqui Con Migo" as a member of Plan B.

== Career ==
=== 2005–2011: Chosen Few III: The Movie and La Musica del Futuro ===
In 2005, with the help of Chencho from reggaeton duo Plan B, Durán was featured in a compilation album (El Draft 2005) with his song "Me Gustan Todas". After he was part of "El Draft Del Reggaeton" he was signed to Chosen Few Emerald Entertainment, Inc.

In 2007, "Hustlin Time" featuring Rick Ross was released to promote Chosen Few III: The Movie. In 2008, Fuego scored his first big hit "Mi Alma Se Muere", which was the lead single from Chosen Few III: The Movie. "Mi Alma Se Muere" Remix featuring Pitbull and Omega "El Fuerte" was released later that year, and the remix peaked at No. 22 with over 24 weeks on the Top 100 Billboards Tropical. In 2009, he released "Super Estrella" featuring Omega "El Fuerte" which was the first single to his debut album La Musica del Futuro. In December 2009, his second single was released "Que Buena Tu Ta" featuring Deevani which peaked at No. 2 on the Top 100 Billboards Tropical for 12 weeks. In 2010, two remixes to "Que Buena Tu Ta" were released—one featuring Serani and a Dominican version featuring Mozart La Para, Black Point, Sensato del Patio, Los Pepes, Monkey Black and Villanosam. In April 2010, Fuego released his third single "Ya Te Olvide" and in June 2010 Fuego an online release titled "Una Vaina Loca" (which samples Gyptian's "Hold Yuh"). By 2011, "Una Vaina Loca" became an international hit with more than 30 million plays on YouTube. Fuego's debut album La Musica del Futuro was released on August 3, 2010 (CD/Digital) and peaked at No. 36 on the Billboard Top Latin Albums chart. He was nominated for Premio Lo Nuestro 2011 in the category Revelacion del año urbano.

=== 2012–2014: Touring and Fireboy Forever (The Mixtape) ===
In 2012 Fuego spent months touring the world, visiting Europe, Central America, South America and North America. During December 2012, Fuego prepared the release of his single "Mala Mia"; he released its music video in February 2013. The same month, Fuego's mother died, and he slowed promotion and releases for several months. Later that year, in August 2013, he was featured on the Mambo remix of Jencarlos Canela's "I Love It", which was produced by Bones El Galactico. In October 2013, he released his second single, "Prendelo", which was followed by its music video in March 2014. Fuego followed this in April 2014 with the digital single "U La La", a reggaeton record produced by Scarspro and Don Omar's producers A&X (Alcover & Xtassy), In early May 2014 Fuego's single "Prendelo" reached number 7 on the Billboard Latin Tropical chart. On Christmas Day 2014, Fuego released Fireboy Forever (The Mixtape), which featured 19 songs including collaborations with Sensato, Farruko, Rickylindo, Notch, Dynasty ("The Prince of Dance Hall"), Zion & Lennox amongst others.

=== 2015: New music and creating Fireboy Forever 2 ===
In early May 2015, Fuego released "iLike", produced by DJ Chino (Pitbull's DJ). This was followed in June 2015 by the reggaeton single "Solos", which was produced by Scarspro and Jaeycol Federal. In mid-June 2015 Fuego teamed up with Colombian artist Fanny Lu and released the song "Quiero Reir", a merengue electronico song produced by Maffio. In early July 2015 Fuego landed a feature on Pitbull's song "Mami Mami" from his Spanish album Dale, which was released on July 17, 2015.

In mid-August 2015 Fuego announces via his social media pages that he was working on Fireboy Forever 2: The Album. In late August 2015 Fuego covered/remixed Drake's song "Hotline Bling" in Spanish, calling it "Cuando Suena El Bling". It became a hit on SoundCloud. The blog The Muse on Jezebel called it "better than Drake's", while the Más Sun Times complimented it, saying it "will make your Monday better". Paper magazine ranked it number two on their list of the best and worst covers of "Hotline Bling", and was the only Spanish version on the list. Noisey ranked it number three on their list of "Hotline Bling" remixes, making it again the only Spanish version to be included on the list. The Hundreds placed it at number three on their "10 Track Commandments, Vol. 6 :: Sh*t You Shouldn't Sleep On" list. Noisey later published an article breaking down the creation of the remix and some of Fuego's influences.

Following the success of his previous cover, on September 13, 2015, Fuego released another, this time Yo Gotti and Young Thug's song "Rihanna". The remix became a hit on SoundCloud once again, and on September 16, blog site Remezcla picked up the song and wrote an article stating that "This rework might just be better than Young Thug's English version, since we can't understand what Young Thug is saying anyway". On September 20, the remix gained the attention of Vice, who added it to episode 12 of their weekly show on Apple Music's Beats 1 station.

On October 5, 2015, Fuego's "Quiero Reir" record with Fanny Lu reached number one on Venezuela's National Report chart in its Top Latino Category and in the general chart at a national level.

On October 11, 2015, Fuego released another remix, turning Majid Jordan and Drake's "My Love" into a Spanish cover called "Mi Amor". Remezcla called Fuego the "undisputed king of Spanish remixes" and said that "Fuego continues making the type of remixes that are needed for a Spanish-speaking hip-hop-loving audience".

On October 16, 2015, Fuego released "Loca Con La Vaina", the first single from his album Fireboy Forever 2. The song, a Spanish trap/hip hop record with heavy bass, was produced by Luyo & Capi of the Associates. On October 29, 2015, Fuego released "Mambo Para Bailar", a merengue electronico song produced by Maffio.

On November 16, 2015, Fuego released "Antidito", a Spanish remix of Travis Scott's song "Antidote". On December 1, 2015, Fuego released the music video to "Cuando Suena El Bling" his Spanish version of "Hotline Bling".

On December 29, 2015, Fuego released two songs via SoundCloud/YouTube; the first, "Se Me Nota", was featured on Fireboy Forever 2 and is a trap song with bachata influences, produced by Sango Beats. Later that day, Fuego released the official remix of his song "Mambo Para Bailar" featuring Puerto Rican Reggaeton artist Arcangel, produced by Maffio.

=== 2016–present: Fireboy Forever 2 ===
Fuego began 2016 by teasing his album Fireboy Forever 2, which was scheduled to be released on January 12, 2016. It was preceded in 2015 by the singles "Loca Con La Vaina" and "Se Me Nota"; the third single "Diferente" was premiered with a music video via YouTube on January 7 before the actual audio was available, which was made available with the album.

=== Controversy with Dile Quien Soy ===
In March 2018 it was discovered that he used, without any permission, music from the video game To the Moon in his single "Dile Quien Soy". Fuego's team assured that the producer Smash David composed the song independently, and that they were unaware of the illegitimate use of the theme song.

== Discography ==
=== Studio albums ===
- La Musica Del Futuro (2010)
- Fireboy Forever 2 (2016)
- You're Welcome (2019)
- Nightshift (2020)
- Supremo (2021)

=== Mixtapes ===
- Demasiado Avanzado (2007)
- La Musica Del Futuro Vol.1 (2008)
- Amor y Fuego The Mixtape (2009)
- Fireboy Forever The Mixtape (2014)
