= Si No Le Contesto =

2010 song performed by Plan B

Single by Plan B

from the album House of Pleasure
- Released: March 16, 2010
- Genre: Reggaeton
- Length: 3:39
- Label: Pina Records
- Songwriters: Orlando Javier Valle Vega; Edwin F. Vázquez
- Producer: Haze

Plan B singles chronology
""Solos" Ft. Tony Dize" (2009)	"Si No Le Contesto" (2010)	"Es Un Secreto" (2010)

"Si No Le Contesto" (English: If I Don't Answer Her) is a lead single by the reggaeton duo Plan B off their third studio album, House of Pleasure. The song has a remix featuring reggaeton artist Tony Dize & the reggaeton duo Zion & Lennox. In the remix version of the song, Tony Dize and Zion sing the verse of the song where Chencho sings but Chencho gets a new verse in the song. Although the remix speaks of the album, House of Pleasure, it isn't in it. Both the original and the remix has a music video. The song peaked at number 8 on the Billboard Latin charts and remained on the charts for 102 weeks.

== Music videos ==
In the music video it shows a woman named Andrea trying to get a hold of Chencho. She asks why he can't come over with her. He doesn't answer. She thinks about what he could be doing at his hotel. Maldy is singing the song along with Chencho. They go to many places on their tour and the woman gets more suspicious. Chencho gets into an elevator, the woman stops it from closing and then hugs Chencho and the video ends with "Fin" (English: End).

In the music video's remix it has Plan B, Tony Dize and Zion & Lennox sing during the music video and starts with a sign of "House of Pleasure" which is like their album, House of Pleasure. The video has Chencho and Maldy dance in a different place with a lighter scene wearing top hats and dancing with umbrellas in a fake rain shower. The producer of both songs, Haze, is in both the original and remix video. Duran "The Coach" and Myztiko also were producers of the remix.

== Chart performance ==
Chart (2011)	Peak position
US Hot Latin Songs (Billboard)	8

== Certifications ==
Region	Certification	Certified units/sales
Mexico (AMPROFON)	Gold	30,000^{*}
^{*} Sales figures based on certification alone.

== Versions ==
- Si No Le Contesto Plan B - 3:07
- Si No Le Contesto (Remix) feat. Tony Dize & Zion & Lennox - 4:28
- Si No Le Contesto (Remix Crossover) feat. Lumidee & DyNasty - 4:24
