= Down (R.K.M & Ken-Y song) =

Single by R.K.M & Ken-Y

from the album Masterpiece
- Released: 2006
- Recorded: 2006
- Genre: Reggaeton
- Length: 3:45
- Label: Pina
- Songwriters: Wise; José Nieves (R.K.M); Rafael Pina Nieves; Kenny Vázquez (Ken-Y)
- Producer: Mambo Kingz

R.K.M & Ken-Y singles chronology
"Dame Lo Que Quiero" (2006)	"Down" (2006)	"Me Matas" (2006)

"Down" is the first single released from the debut album of the reggaeton duo R.K.M & Ken-Y, Masterpiece (2006). "Down" is sung in both English and Spanish languages. The song wasn't supposed to be a single, but due to its massive radio airplay and popularity, it became the album's second single, after "Dame Lo Que Quiero". The song was composed by Wise and Rafael Pina Nieves and produced by Mambo Kingz.

== Remixes ==
- The official remix featured Héctor el Father.
- Another official remix was made featuring Nina Sky.
- The song has also been remixed into a more pop-style and into bachata as well as salsa.

== Charts ==
Chart (2006)	Peak position
US Billboard Hot 100	90
US Hot Latin Songs (Billboard)	1
US Latin Airplay (Billboard)	1
US Latin Pop Airplay (Billboard)	30
US Tropical Airplay (Billboard)	1
US Latin Rhythm Airplay (Billboard)	1

== See also ==
- List of Billboard Latin Rhythm Airplay number ones of 2006
