= R.K.M & Ken-Y =

Puerto Rican reggaeton duo

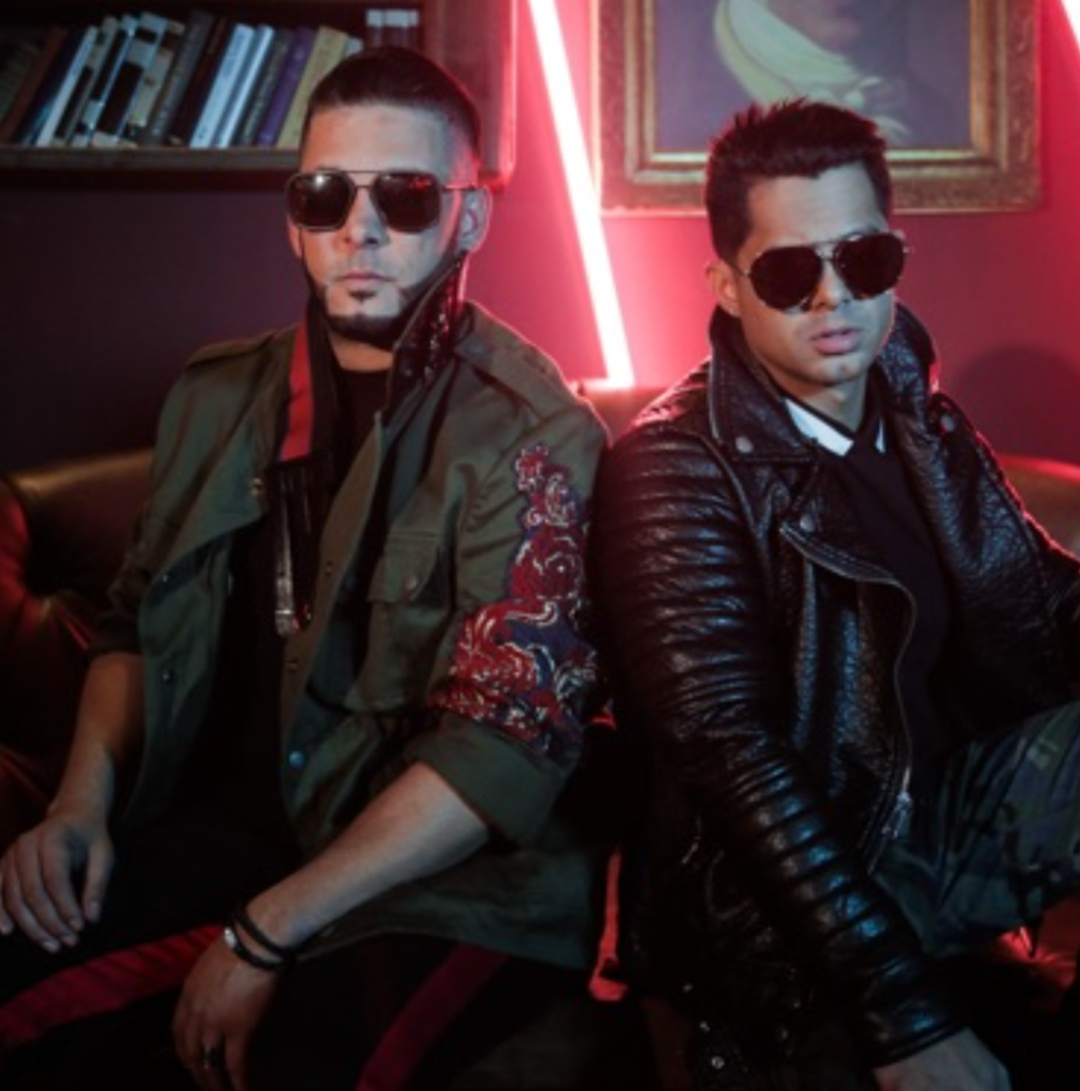

Background information
- Also known as: Rakim & Ken-Y; El Dúo Romantico; Los Magníficos; Los Reyes de Mambo
- Origin: Gurabo, Puerto Rico
- Genres: Reggaeton; Bachata; Latin pop
- Years active: 2003–2013; 2017–2024
- Labels: Pina; Universal Latino; Machete; Money Machine
- Members: José Nieves (R.K.M); Kenny Vázquez (Ken-Y)

R.K.M & Ken-Y is a Puerto Rican reggaeton duo formed in 2003 by José Nieves (R.K.M) and Kenny Vázquez (Ken-Y). The artists are renowned in the Latin music world for being the first to successfully fuse mainstream pop music with the reggaeton street rhythms of Puerto Rico and expose the style to a wide international audience. The sound introduced by R.K.M & Ken-Y would go on to inspire the pop reggaeton songs of successful acts such as CNCO, J Balvin, and Maluma. The duo had a very successful career with the Spanish-speaking audience of Latin America, the United States, and Spain until their separation in 2013. In June 2017, the duo announced their official return by Pina Records. In mid-2021 the Duo confirmed that they are on hiatus and are currently working on their solo projects.

== Early career ==
R.K.M & Ken-Y hail both from Gurabo, Puerto Rico, Ken-Y was born on September 7, 1984, and has turned into one of the most recognized duos in reggaeton. The duo started their music career in high school. R.K.M (formerly known as "Rakim" but changed to avoid confusion with the established hip-hop artist) was inspired by the explosion of reggaeton music in the 1990s. He encouraged Ken-Y to join him to form a duo; they performed at 15th birthday parties (quinceañeras) and public events.

In 2002 both artists were discovered by veteran reggaeton producer and former artist Q Mack Daddy (who also discovered Magnate & Valentino and worked for Héctor el Father's Gold Star Music record label). Q Mac gave the duo their first big break in Puerto Rico on the fourth volume of his famous compilation series "The Warriors". After debuting with "Una Noche Mas" from Q Mac's album "The Warriors 4: Los 14 Guerreros", the song was a local hit in Puerto Rican radio and caught the attention of many record producers as most people noticed the duo's similarity to popular reggaeton artists Zion & Lennox. After working with DJ Negro on The Noise Live: Asi Comienza El Ruido and Mr. Notty (Money Machine) for the compilation "Ban-2 Korrupto", the success of these songs drove a bidding war between Puerto Rican labels to sign them. Ultimately, the duo chose to sign with Pina Records in early 2004 making their first appearance in the greatest hits various artists album "Pina All-Stars 2" which included 3 new songs from R.K.M y Ken-Y to introduce the duo to a wider audience.

After being featured on reggaeton records with veteran labelmate Polaco, the duo received their first big break on an international scale in 2005 by working with the renowned artists Don Omar and Nicky Jam. R.K.M y Ken-Y recorded the collaboration "Si La Vez" with Don Omar from his various artists' album "Los Bandoleros" executively produced by Don Omar. Nicky Jam gave them a chance to make an appearance on his album, "Vida Escante". They were featured on "Pasado" and "Me Estoy Muriendo". These songs were very popular within the reggaeton community. The duo's contribution to the Don Omar album helped mold the group into a more mainstream attraction. Soon afterward Chencho Corleone (from reggaeton duo Plan B) allowed R.K.M y Ken-Y to appear on his various artists' album "El Draft" co-executively produced with Boy Wonder (Chosen Few Entertainment). Boy Wonder, the producer of the CD/DVD Chosen Few El Documental, and Chencho Corleone, of the popular but controversial duo Plan B, were producing a CD entitled "El Draft Del Reggaeton" which provided up-and-coming artists a shot at recognition. Fans were allowed to vote for their favorite artists and R.K.M y Ken-Y won the competition which made their song into the album's lead single. "Tu No Estas" from "El Draft Del Reggaeton" became R.K.M y Ken-Y's first song to chart in the United States. This newfound exposure built up anticipation for their debut album, "Masterpiece: Nuestra Obra Maestra" distributed by Universal Latino in partnership with Pina Records.

== International success ==
In 2006, R.K.M & Ken-Y's debut album "Masterpiece" was released, debuting at #2 on the Latin Billboards, behind only Marc Anthony's "Sigo Siendo Yo: Grandes Éxitos." Their single "Down" debuted at #1. On August 18, the duo had their first concert in a sold-out Choliseo. Currently, they are working on a Pina Records compilation album titled "Los Magnificos." The album was nominated for Premio Lo Nuestro of 2007. Their first hit single was "Down", reaching #1 on the Billboard Hot Latin Songs chart in 2006 and would win Best Reggaeton Song at the Billboard Latin Music Awards. Four other singles were released from the album, as well as music videos. The album went double Latin platinum in the United States and sold about 600,000 copies worldwide. The duo had many successful tours across the world for various years after "Masterpiece" including headlining the world-renowned Viña del Mar International Song Festival in Chile. They have released the songs performed on tour on an album entitled Masterpiece: World Tour (Sold Out). They have also released a special edition version of the album entitled Masterpiece: Commemorative Edition.

Their second studio album, The Royalty: La Realeza, was released on September 9, 2008.

The first single released from the album was "Mis Días Sin Ti". Raphy Pina announced the return of R.K.M & Ken-Y on February 15, 2008. The date was a concert they held in the Choliseo in San Juan, Puerto Rico. The concert's headline was "Romantic en el Choliseo". Reggaeton artists like Wisin & Yandel, Tito "El Bambino", Nicky Jam, Rene Moz and Arcángel were present. Other artists like N'Klabe and Karis were also present.

Three years later they released their final studio album, Forever, on February 14, 2011, two singles were released from the album, and have featured in this album Zion & Lennox, Alexis & Fido and Arthur Hanlon.

In 2012 they released "Cuando Te Enamores", which became part of the most popular album of 2013, La Fórmula, featuring Plan B, Zion & Lennox, Arcángel, Lobo and more, which was the last work of R.K.M & Ken-Y before returning as a duo in mid-2017.

Since their first album, R.K.M & Ken-Y have appeared and guest starred on many songs. They have worked with artists such as Cruzito, Don Omar, Daddy Yankee, José Feliciano, Pitbull, Héctor el Father, David Bisbal, Ivy Queen, Chino & Nacho, Hector Acosta "El Torito", Plan B, Tony Dize and Zion & Lennox.

=== Separation ===
On April 10, 2013, producer Raphy Pina announced that the duo would separate but they continued with their scheduled performances and appearances. Both artists took this decision with each focusing on future solo projects.

After Ken-Y left Pina Records he signed with a label called Fresh Production. On January 22, 2016, Ken-Y released his first solo album The King Of Romance which features Nicky Jam, Natti Natasha, and Manny Montes. The singles that were released on this album were "Te Invito A Volar", "Sentirte Mía", "Fórmula De Amor", and "Como Lo Hacia Yo". The album hit No. 1 in the Latín Rhythm Albums category.

R.K.M was also making an album called Diferente, which means "different", which is an album that will change how R.K.M is viewed as not only a rapper but a singer too. It was originally supposed to be released in 2017 but was never released due to him and Ken-Y getting back together. But in a recent post on August 15, 2020, by R.K.M on his official Instagram that "Diferente" is Coming.

=== Reunion ===
On June 23, 2017, after four years of separation, R.K.M & Ken-Y returned to their duo status. They grew up together and felt they needed to work together to be successful. Under the command of its creator Raphy Pina the duo announces their return ready to fall back on the world with their unique style. The duo starts their union with the remix of success played by Arcángel & De La Ghetto's "Más Que Ayer".

The duo in October 2019 had their most recent hit "Cuando Lo Olvides" which peaked in the Latin charts this song goes back to their romantic roots. In mid-2020 rumors speculated that the duo are not together anymore after R.K.M started working on his solo album "Diferente", R.K.M and Ken-Y both confirmed the separations and are currently working on their solo projects.

From their return to separation (2017–2020) the duo has collaborated with huge stars like Arcángel, De La Ghetto, Daddy Yankee, Plan B, Natti Natasha, Ozuna, Noriel, Darkiel, Divino, Chris Wandell and Lyanno, and more. Their list of hits include "Tonta", "Zum Zum", and "Cuando Lo Olvides".

== Discography ==
=== Studio albums ===
- Masterpiece (2006)
- The Royalty: La Realeza (2008)
- Forever (2011)

=== Live albums ===
- Masterpiece: World Tour (Sold Out) (2006)
- Romantico 360°: Live From Puerto Rico (2009)

=== Compilation albums ===
- Masterpiece "Commemorative Edition" (2007)
- The Last Chapter (2010)

=== Solo albums ===
- Ken-Y: The King Of Romance (2016)
- R.K.M: Diferente (coming soon)

=== Singles ===
- "Down"
- "Me Matas"
- "Dame Lo Que Quiero"
- "Igual Que Ayer"
- "Down (Remix)" (featuring Héctor el Father)
- "Oh Oh, ¿Porqué Te Están Velando?"
- "Llorarás"
- "Mis Días Sin Ti"
- "Te Regalo Amores"
- "Tuve Un Sueño" (featuring Plan B)
- "Vicio Del Pecado"
- "Quiero Un Pueblo Que Cante" (featuring Plan B, Cruzito & Tony Dize)
- "Te Ame En Mis Suenos"
- "Por Amor A Ti"
- "Más"
- "Mi Corazón Esta Muerto"
- "Cuando Te Enamores"
- "Princesa" (Ken-Y only)
- "Donde Estas" (R.K.M only)
- "Navegar En Mis Recuerdos" (Ken-Y only)
- "Quedate Junto A Mi"
- "Tonta" (featuring Natti Natasha)
- "Zum Zum" (featuring Daddy Yankee & Arcángel)
- ''No Reciclo Amores"
- "Una Noche Mas"
- ”Cuando Lo Olvides”
- “Mascara”
- ”Pa'l Espejo”
- "Jugaste a Perderme" (featuring Peter Nieto) (2021)
- "Paso a Paso" (featuring 4K Musica) (2022)
- "Orgullo" (2023)

=== Collaborations ===
Year	Song	Featured artist(s)
2004	"Pasado"	Nicky Jam feat. R.K.M & Ken-Y
2004	"Me Estoy Muriendo"	Nicky Jam feat. R.K.M & Ken-Y
2004	"Si La Ves"	R.K.M & Ken-Y feat. Don Omar
2005	"Ando Solo"	Polaco feat. Ken-Y
2006	"Noche Triste"	Lito MC Cassidy feat. Ken-Y
2006	"Tengo Un Amor (Remix)"	Toby Love feat. R.K.M & Ken-Y
2007	"Quizás (Remix)"	Tony Dize feat. Ken-Y
2007	"En Que Fallamos (Remix)"	Ivy Queen feat. Ken-Y
2007	"Fans"	Tito "El Bambino" feat. R.K.M & Ken-Y
2007	"¿Quién Me Iba A Decir? (Remix)"	David Bisbal feat. R.K.M & Ken-Y
2007	"Si Ya No Estás"	N'Klabe feat. R.K.M & Ken-Y
2007	"La Amas Como Yo"	Karis feat. Ken-Y
2007	"Mar y Cielo"	José Feliciano feat. R.K.M & Ken-Y
2007	"Gas Pela"	Nicky Jam feat. R.K.M & Ken-Y
2007	"Ton Ton Ton"	Nicky Jam feat. R.K.M & Ken-Y
2007	"Quédate Con Él"	Nicky Jam feat. R.K.M & Ken-Y and Cruzito
2008	"Quién Dijo Amigos (Remix)"	Ana Isabelle feat. R.K.M & Ken-Y
2008	"Vicio del Pecado"	R.K.M & Ken-Y feat. Héctor Acosta "El Torito"
2008	"Te Regalo Amores (Remix)"	R.K.M & Ken-Y feat. Ivy Queen
2009	"Te Amo (Remix)"	Makano feat. R.K.M & Ken-Y
2009	"El Perdedor (Remix)"	Aventura feat. Ken-Y
2009	"Tu Primera Vez"	Héctor Acosta "El Torito" feat. R.K.M & Ken-Y
2009	"No Hay Nadie Mas"	Nicky Jam feat. R.K.M & Ken-Y
2009	"El Culpable Soy Yo (Remix)"	Cristian Castro feat. R.K.M & Ken-Y
2009	"One In A Million"	Ken-Y feat. Cruzito
2009	"Se Apagó La Llama"	Chino & Nacho feat. R.K.M & Ken-Y
2009	"Mi Amor Es Pobre"	Tony Dize feat. Arcángel and Ken-Y
2010	"Mi Delirio (Remix)"	Anahí feat. Ken-Y
2010	"El Doctorado (Remix)"	Tony Dize feat. Ken-Y and Don Omar
2010	"Lloras"	R.K.M & Ken-Y feat. Plan B
2010	"Déjame Entrar"	R.K.M & Ken-Y feat. Marcos Yaroide
2011	"Bésame (Remix)"	R.K.M & Ken-Y feat. Nova & Jory
2011	"Tus Recuerdos Son Mi Dios"	R.K.M & Ken-Y feat. Pipe Calderón
2011	"No Vuelvas (Remix)"	R.K.M & Ken-Y feat. Zion & Lennox
2011	"Solo Pienso En Ti (Remix)"	Jerry Rivera feat. Ken-Y
2011	"Pienso en Ti (Remix)"	Eloy feat. R.K.M & Ken-Y
2011	"3 Pa' 3"	R.K.M feat. Maldy and Lennox
2012	"Diosa de los Corazones"	R.K.M & Ken-Y, Zion & Lennox, Arcángel and Lobo
2012	"More"	Zion feat. Jory and Ken-Y
2012	"La Fórmula Perfecta"	Ken-Y feat. Arcángel & De La Ghetto
2012	"Pasarla Bien"	R.K.M feat. Lobo and Jalil
2012	"La Fórmula Sigue"	R.K.M & Ken-Y feat. Arcángel, Plan B and Zion & Lennox
2012	"Cuando Te Enamores"	R.K.M & Ken-Y feat. J Álvarez
2013	"Llégale Ya"	Erick J feat. Ken-Y
2013	"Ella Me Pide Calor"	R.K.M feat. Ñengo Flow
2013	"Princesa (Remix)"	Ken-Y feat. Jerry Rivera
2013	"No Vuelvo"	Victor Manuelle feat. Ken-Y

== Awards and nominations ==
=== Grammy Awards ===
Year	Recipient	Award	Result	Ref.
2009	"The Royalty: La Realeza"	Best Latin Urban Album	Nominated	

=== Billboard Latin Music Awards ===
Year	Recipient	Award	Result
2007	"Down"	Hot Latin Song of the Year	Nominated
2007	"Down"	Latin Ringtone of the Year	Nominated
2007	"Down"	Reggaeton Song of the Year	Won
2007	"Masterpiece"	Reggaeton Album of the Year	Nominated
2007	"R.K.M y Ken-Y"	Hot Latin Songs Artist of the Year	Nominated
2008	"Igual que Ayer"	Reggaeton Song of the Year	Won
2008	"Me Matas"	Latin Ringtone of the Year	Won
2009	"The Royalty: La Realeza"	Latin Rhythm Album of the Year, Duo or Group	Nominated
2010	"R.K.M y Ken-Y"	Latin Rhythm Airplay Artist of the Year, Duo or Group	Nominated
2011	"R.K.M y Ken-Y"	Latin Rhythm Albums, Artist of the Year, Duo or Group	Nominated
2012	"R.K.M y Ken-Y"	Latin Rhythm Albums, Artist of the Year, Duo or Group	Nominated
2012	"R.K.M y Ken-Y"	Latin Rhythm Songs, Artist of the Year, Duo or Group	Nominated

=== Premios Lo Nuestro ===
Year	Recipient	Award	Result
2007	Masterpiece	Album of the Year - Urban Genre	Nominated
2007	Down	Song of the Year - Urban Genre	Nominated
2008	Igual que ayer	Urban Song of the Year	Nominated
2008	R.K.M y Ken-Y	Urban Artist of the Year	Nominated
2010	R.K.M y Ken-Y	Urban Artist of the Year	Nominated
2012	Mi Corazón esta muerto	Urban Song of the Year	Nominated

=== Premios Juventud ===
Year	Recipient	Award	Result	Ref.
2007	"R.K.M y Ken-y"	My Urban Artist	Nominated	

=== Premios MTV Latinoamérica ===
Year	Recipient	Award	Result	Ref.
2007	"R.K.M y Ken-Y"	MTV Tr3s Viewer's Choice Award — Mejor Artista Pop	Nominated	

=== Tu Música Urbana Awards ===
Year	Nominated work	Category	Result	Ref.
2019	"R.K.M y Ken-Y"	Urban Artist Duo or Group	Pending	
2019	"Zum Zum"	Urban Song Duo or Group	Pending	
2019	"Zum Zum" (Remix)	Remix of the Year	Pending	

=== Viña del Mar International Song Festival ===
Year	Nominee / work	Award	Result
2009	R.K.M y Ken-Y	"Gaviota de Plata"	Won
2009	R.K.M y Ken-Y	"Antorcha de Oro"	Won
2009	R.K.M y Ken-Y	"Antorcha de Plata"	Won

=== Premios People en Español ===
Year	Nominee / work	Award	Result
2011	R.K.M y Ken-Y	"Mejor Cantante o Grupo Urbano"	Won
