= Masterpiece (Rakim y Ken-Y album) =

Studio album by R.K.M & Ken-Y
- Released: February 14, 2006
- Recorded: 2005–2006
- Genre: Reggaeton; R&B
- Label: Pina; Universal Latino
- Producer: Mambo Kingz; Los Magnificos; Myztiko

R.K.M & Ken-Y chronology
Esperando El Momento (2005)	Masterpiece (2006)	Masterpiece: World Tour (Sold Out) (2006)

Singles from Masterpiece
- 1. "Down" Released: May 2006; 2. "Me Matas" Released: 2006; 3. "Dame Lo Que Quiero" Released: 2006; 4. "Igual Que Ayer" Released: 2007

Professional ratings
Review scores
Source	Rating
Allmusic	3/5 stars

Masterpiece is the debut album of reggaeton duo, R.K.M & Ken-Y. The album includes four singles: "Down", "Me Matas", "Dame Lo Que Quiero" and "Igual Que Ayer". The album did fairly well on the charts, peaking number two on the Top Latin Albums chart and number one on the Top Heatseekers charts. It is considered to be one of the top reggaeton albums and made the duo one of the most successful and popular new artists of 2006. As of 2007, the album has sold over 400,000 copies in the United States. It was nominated for a Lo Nuestro Award for Urban Album of the Year.

== Track listing ==
No.	Title	Length
1.	"Dame Lo Que Quiero"	3:34
2.	"Cruz & Maldición"	4:05
3.	"Down"	3:45
4.	"Igual Que Ayer"	3:52
5.	"Suéltate" (featuring Cruzito)	3:47
6.	"Dime" (only Ken-Y)	4:23
7.	"Me Matas"	3:16
8.	"Adiós"	3:08
9.	"Nos Fuimos" (only R.K.M)	2:54
10.	"Tocarte Toa" (featuring Polaco, Nicky Jam, La India, and Carlitos Way)	4:45
11.	"Si La Ves" (Ken-Y featuring Cruzito)	3:45
12.	"Sacarte De Mi Mente" (featuring Nicky Jam)	3:42
13.	"De La Calle Soy" (featuring Carlitos Way)	3:19
14.	"Amigo"	3:03
15.	"Dime Que Será" (Cruzito)	3:21

Bonus Track
No.	Title	Length
16.	"Way, Way" (Carlitos Way)	4:11

=== Masterpiece: World Tour (Sold Out) ===
On December 12, 2006, a live album was released based on this album. It was based on a concert from Coliseo De Puerto Rico José Miguel Agrelot (English: José Miguel Agrelot Coliseum Of Puerto Rico) in San Juan, Puerto Rico on August 18, 2006.

=== Masterpiece: Commemorative Edition ===
On April 3, 2007, the duo released a two disc special edition titled Masterpiece Commemorative Edition. It was a CD and DVD album with remixes of songs from the standard edition along with a few new songs.

== Charts ==
=== Album ===
Chart (2006)	Peak Position
US Billboard 200	101
US Top Latin Albums (Billboard)	2
US Latin Rhythm Albums (Billboard)	2
US Heatseekers Albums (Billboard)	1

=== Singles ===
Year	Title	Chart positions	
Year	Title	US Billboard Hot 100	US Top Latin Songs
2006	"Down"	90	1
2006	"Me Matas"	—	9
2006	"Dame Lo Que Quiero"	—	50
2006	"Igual Que Ayer"	—	8

== Sales and certifications ==
Region	Certification	Certified units/sales
United States (RIAA)	2× Platinum (Latin)	200,000^{^}
^{^} Shipments figures based on certification alone.
