= Tres Coronas =

American hip hop band

- Also known as: Triple Crown; Triple Corona; Los Verdaderos
- Origin: New York City; Colombia; France; Dominican Republic
- Genres: Hip hop Gangsta rap Reggaeton; Salsa music Currulao; Cumbia music Andean music Vallenato; Guaguancó; Jazz; Bolero; Hard rock
- Years active: 2001–2012; 2019–present
- Labels: Parcero Production; 5–27 Records; 2Good; 3X2 Distribution; Fania Allstar; Universal Music Group; Machete Music
- Members: Rocca; P.N.O; Reychesta

Tres Coronas (alternatively known by the nickname Triple Crown) were a group of three MCs, formed in 2001 in Queens, New York, composed of the New Yorker/Colombian Luis Alfonso Fonseca known as P.N.O., the French/Colombian Sébastian Rocca known as Rocca, and the New Yorker/Dominican José Alberto Collado known as Reychesta. Their music deals with issues of everyday life. Their best-known songs are off their albums Red Mixtape and Nuestra Cosa. Some of their hit tracks are "Falsedades", "Envidias", "Ahora O Nunca". Different producers such as Artwell Smart, Gallegos, Chaze, Shakim and others worked on their albums and projects.

== History ==
In 1999, Rocca was working in New York mixing his music and there he met PoNchO (P.N.O), who showed him his demo and they started working together on a future project. Shortly after Reychesta through New York producer Spank met P.N.O., and the three musicians started recording songs together. At the end of 2001, they had their first two concerts in Colombia. They distributed several CD's, the first in 2001, called "Mixtape", the second in 2002, called "Mixtape Remix" the third in 2004, called "New York Mixtape". The fourth in 2005 was called "Nuestra Cosa", the group's first studio album, which includes 15 songs with collaborations of G.O.D Father Pt. III (of the group Infamous Mobb) and Cormega.

=== Nuestra Cosa: Deluxe Edition and group breakup (2005–2006) ===
In the process of promoting "Nuestra Cosa: Deluxe Edition", Boy Wonder offered a contract to Tres Coronas on the seal "Chosen Few Emerald Entertainment, Inc.", but the only one to accept it was Reychesta, without telling his teammates. Shortly after Gustavo López, he also offered a contract to Tres Coronas on the label "Machete Music", which was accepted by the three members of the group.

There are two documentaries of the group, the official and the unofficial, both called: "Tres Coronas: Nuestra Cosa".

=== Conflicts after the separation of Reychesta from the group ===
After his departure from the group, Reychesta continues his singing career as a soloist in "Chosen Few Emerald Entertainment, Inc.", a company of Boy Wonder in which he had already signed approximately seven months before his departure from group Tres Coronas. The controversies continued because after their separation, Rocca and P.N.O retain the name Tres Coronas, after Rocca registered the trademark Tres Coronas in his name.

In 2011, Rocca and P.N.O, on their album "La Música Es Mi Arma", published a song called "Aquí Llegamos (Intro)" in which they used the production of Artwell Smart (music producer and best friend of Reychesta).

=== La Música Es Mi Arma, second and last studio album of "Tres Coronas" (2009–2011) ===
In mid-2009, Rocca and P.N.O had already finished the new album "La Música Es Mi Arma", unfortunately the label "Machete Music" did not understand the concept of the album. They spent a year and a half trying to recover the album with the help of lawyers. That fight ended up depleting Tres Coronas, they also felt that a good part of their audience had remained in the most basic and traditional rap schemes of the '90, and only now many begin to appreciate the work of that moment. Finally, in 2011, they published the album, a special edition exclusively for Colombia was also released.

=== Return of "Tres Coronas" (2019) ===
In October 2019, "Tres Coronas" (Rocca & P.N.O) performed at the Colombian festival, "Hip Hop al Parque".

== Recognitions and nomination for Latin Grammy 2007 ==
In 2006, the song "Vamos a Jugar" with Kafu Banton, was on the playlist of MTV Tr3s, mun2 and Univision. In 2007 they were nominated for the 8th Annual Latin Grammy Awards, nominating in the category best urban song, a remix of "Mi Tumbao" with Michael Stuart. He competed against Calle 13, Orishas, Daddy Yankee and Don Omar with Wisin & Yandel. Finally Residente and Visitante won the prize.

Year	Ceremony	Work	Category	Result	Ref
8th Annual Latin Grammy Awards		Mi Tumbao (Remix)	best urban song	Nominated	

== Record labels ==
The negotiations for the different distributions of the Tres Coronas albums were, in Colombia for the label "5–27 Records" (of the group La Etnnia), in France, Belgium, Switzerland and Spain, for the "2Good" stamp, in Spain for the "3X2 Distribution" label, in United States for the stamps "Fania Allstar" and "Universal Music Group", the latter also did it for South America, lowered his Latin American department "Machete Music".

== Discography ==
=== Tres Coronas (Reychesta, P.N.O and Rocca) ===
- 2001: Mixtape (Parcero Production/5–27 Records)

#	Title	Performer(s)	Producer(s)	Time
1	"Intro"	Rocca & Reychesta	Gallegos & Rocca	1:35
2	"El Trato"	Rocca, P.N.O & Reychesta	Gallegos	4:10
3	"La Vuelta"	P.N.O & Rocca	A.n.D (Armen & Lenny Barr)	3:11
4	"Para El Futuro"	P.N.O & Reychesta	Shakim	3:23
5	"Arte Callejero"	P.N.O & Rocca	Gallegos	3:16
6	"Llama Me"	Wallen Ft. Rocca	Sulee B. Wax	4:49
7	"Falsedades"	Rocca, Reychesta & P.N.O	Artwell Smart	4:40
8	"La Conección"	P.N.O	Chaze	3:21
9	"La Corona"	Rocca & P.N.O	Armen	4:17
10	"El Original"	Rocca Ft. Carlos "Kutimba" Spósito	Rocca	4:18
11	"Dime Papi"	Rocca, Reychesta & P.N.O	Gallegos	4:59
12	"Traffic"	Rocca	Gallegos	3:44

- 2002: Mixtape Remix (Parcero Production)

#	Title	Performer(s)	Producer(s)	Time
1	"Intro"	Rocca & Reychesta	Gallegos & Rocca	1:35
2	"El Trato"	Rocca, P.N.O & Reychesta	Gallegos	4:10
3	"La Vuelta"	P.N.O & Rocca	A.n.D (Armen & Lenny Barr)	3:11
4	"Para El Futuro"	P.N.O & Reychesta	Shakim	3:23
5	"Arte Callejero"	P.N.O & Rocca	Gallegos	3:16
6	"Llama Me"	Wallen Ft. Rocca	Sulee B. Wax	4:49
7	"Falsedades"	Rocca, Reychesta & P.N.O	Artwell Smart	4:40
8	"La Conección"	P.N.O	Chaze	3:21
9	"La Corona"	Rocca & P.N.O	Armen	4:17
10	"El Original"	Rocca Ft. Carlos "Kutimba" Spósito	Rocca	4:18
11	"Dime Papi"	Rocca, Reychesta & P.N.O	Gallegos	4:59
12	"15 Añera"	P.N.O & Reychesta	Artwell Smart	3:27
13	"El Jibarito"	Rocca, Reychesta & P.N.O	Artwell Smart	3:21

- 2004: New York Mixtape (Parcero Production/Ecko Unltd.)

#	Title	Performer(s)	Producer(s)	Time
1	"Envidias"	Rocca, P.N.O & Reychesta	Gallegos	4:19
2	"La Jugada"	Rocca, P.N.O & Reychesta	Artwell Smart	4:10
3	"Habilidad"	Reychesta Ft. Nas	Doug Wilson and Sean Cane	3:05
4	"Prenda El Mic"	Rocca	Just Blaze	2:21
5	"Si Me Van a Retar"	P.N.O	Andre Harris, Felony and Vidal Davis	2:24
6	"Emigrante"	Rocca, P.N.O & Reychesta	Shakim	2:51
7	"Con Ganas De Triunfar"	P.N.O Ft. A.L. (All Lyrics)	Rocca	2:51
8	"Jibarito"	Rocca, Reychesta & P.N.O	Artwell Smart	3:21
9	"Entre Tú y Yo"	Rocca & P.N.O	Needlz	2:30
10	"Real"	Rocca, P.N.O & Reychesta	Isaac Hayes, David Porter (musician) and Marley Marl	3:21
11	"De Esta Vida"	P.N.O	Gallegos	3:22
12	"El Consejo"	Grupo Folclórico y Experimental Madera	Gallegos & Rocca	1:27
13	"Inspiración"	Reychesta, Rocca & P.N.O	Havoc	2:27
14	"Valió La Pena"	Reychesta	Tony Ronald and Shakim	3:37
15	"Solo Me Deja Mi Tristeza"	Rocca, P.N.O & Reychesta, Andrey Vinogradov Ft. Galina Lipina	Midi Mafia	2:37
16	"La Conexión 2"	Rocca & P.N.O Ft. Macko	Gallegos	3:56
17	"Creen Que"	Reychesta & P.N.O	Shakim	2:50
18	"Pueden Verlo"	Rocca & Reychesta	Red Spyda	2:57
19	"Victoria"	Reychesta	Bill Conti, Stevie J & Puff Daddy	3:10
20	"What You Think Of That? (Dissing Nas)"	Memphis Bleek Ft. Jay-Z and Rocca	Buckwild	4:39

- 2005: Nuestra Cosa (Parcero Production/2Good)

#	Title	Performer(s)	Producer(s)	Time
1	"Ahora o Nunca"	P.N.O, Rocca & Reychesta	Traffic (Lorenzo Rocca)	4:08
2	"Instinto Animal"	Rocca, Reychesta & P.N.O	Rocca	3:55
3	"Envidias"	Rocca, P.N.O & Reychesta	Gallegos	4:24
4	"Nuestra Cosa"	Rocca, Reychesta & P.N.O Ft. Lianna	Traffic (Lorenzo Rocca)	3:49
5	"Los Infamous"	P.N.O & Reychesta Ft. G.O.D Father Pt. III	Vic	3:53
6	"Traiciones"	P.N.O, Rocca & Reychesta Ft. Yaite Ramos Rodriguez	Gary Thomas (musician) and Gallegos	4:15
7	"El Alma Al Diablo"	Reychesta, Rocca & P.N.O Ft. Dulbis	Willie Colón and Gallegos	3:30
8	"Mi Tumbao"	Rocca	Rocca	3:42
9	"Trago Fiesta Bongo"	P.N.O	Artwell Smart	3:19
10	"Hit Me"	Rocca, P.N.O & Reychesta	Rocca	3:57
11	"Rateros"	Reychesta & P.N.O Ft. Cormega	Shakim	4:08
12	"Sorpresas"	Rocca, P.N.O & Reychesta	Fred Myrow, Artwell Smart, Gallegos & Rocca	3:40
13	"El Preso"	P.N.O, Reychesta & Rocca	Chaze	3:48
14	"La Conexión"	Rocca & P.N.O Ft. Macko	Gallegos	3:57
15	"Quién Va Romper?"	Reychesta, P.N.O & Rocca	Gallegos	3:34

- 2006: Nuestra Cosa: Deluxe Edition (Parcero Production/Machete Music)

#	Title	Performer(s)	Producer(s)	Time
1	"Ahora o Nunca"	P.N.O, Rocca & Reychesta	Traffic (Lorenzo Rocca)	4:08
2	"Instinto Animal"	Rocca, Reychesta & P.N.O	Rocca	3:55
3	"Envidias"	Rocca, P.N.O & Reychesta	Gallegos	4:24
4	"Otro Día"	P.N.O & Rocca Ft. Negro Jetro	Artwell Smart	3:05
5	"Nuestra Cosa"	Rocca, Reychesta & P.N.O Ft. Lianna	Traffic (Lorenzo Rocca)	3:49
6	"Vamos a Jugar"	Rocca, P.N.O and Kafu Banton	Layce and Owen Meese	3:01
7	"Los Infamous"	P.N.O & Reychesta Ft. G.O.D Father Pt. III	Vic	3:53
8	"Traiciones"	P.N.O, Rocca & Reychesta Ft. Yaite Ramos Rodriguez	Gary Thomas (musician) and Gallegos	4:15
9	"El Alma Al Diablo"	Reychesta, Rocca & P.N.O Ft. Dulbis	Willie Colón and Gallegos	3:30
10	"Mi Tumbao"	Rocca	Rocca	3:42
11	"Trago Fiesta Bongo"	P.N.O	Artwell Smart	3:19
12	"Hit Me"	Rocca, P.N.O & Reychesta	Rocca	3:57
13	"Rateros"	Reychesta & P.N.O	Shakim	3:02
14	"Sorpresas"	Rocca, P.N.O & Reychesta	Fred Myrow, Artwell Smart, Gallegos & Rocca	3:40
15	"El Preso"	P.N.O, Reychesta & Rocca	Chaze	3:48
16	"La Conexión"	Rocca & P.N.O Ft. Macko	Gallegos	3:57
17	"Quién Va Romper?"	Reychesta, P.N.O & Rocca	Gallegos	3:34
18	"Exclusive Documentary"			
19	"Ahora o Nunca (DVD)"	P.N.O, Rocca & Reychesta	Traffic (Lorenzo Rocca)	4:08
20	"Envidias (DVD)"	Rocca, P.N.O & Reychesta	Gallegos	4:24
21	"Rateros (DVD)"	Reychesta & P.N.O	Shakim	2:45
22	"Falsedades (DVD)"	Rocca, Reychesta & P.N.O	Artwell Smart	4:40
23	"El Alma Al Diablo (DVD)"	Reychesta, Rocca & P.N.O Ft. Dulbis	Willie Colón and Gallegos	3:30

=== Tres Coronas (P.N.O and Rocca) ===
- 2007: Street Album (Parcero Production)

#	Title	Performer(s)	Producer(s)	Time
1	"Mas Fuerte"	P.N.O & Rocca	P. Castro (DJ Nomad)	4:23
2	"A Criticarme"	Rocca & P.N.O	DJ Kodh	4:06
3	"Bang! Bang!"	Rocca & P.N.O Ft. Nancy Sinatra	Lee Hazlewood and Needlz	2:55
4	"Fake Records"	P.N.O & Rocca	P. Castro (DJ Nomad)	3:41
5	"Las 5 Reglas"	P.N.O & Rocca Ft. Macko	Artwell Smart	3:40
6	"Ya Olvidar"	P.N.O & Rocca Ft. Martinha	Pocho Pérez and P. Castro (DJ Nomad)	4:09
7	"Otra Historia"	P.N.O & Rocca	P. Castro (DJ Nomad)	2:33
8	"Entremos Al Party"	Rocca & P.N.O	Gallegos	3:53
9	"Venenosas"	P.N.O & Rocca Ft. Buju Banton		2:46
10	"New York"	P.N.O & Rocca Ft. Sergio Veneno	P. Castro (DJ Nomad)	4:39
11	"No Es Real"	Rocca & P.N.O Ft. Chavito	P. Castro (DJ Nomad)	3:22
12	"Para Los Que Entienden"	P.N.O & Rocca Ft. Eye-N-See	Midas	4:39
13	"Princesa"	P.N.O & Rocca	A.n.D (Armen & Lenny Barr) and Rocca	3:18
14	"Mi Tumbao (Remix)"	Rocca Ft. P.N.O and Michael Stuart	Rocca	4:07
15	"Así Es"	Rocca & P.N.O	Joe Reisman and Pete Rock	3:16
16	"Nació Latino (Tiraera Pa' Nas)"	Rocca & P.N.O	Jim Hilton and Will.i.am	3:39

- 2008: Mas Fuerte (Parcero Production/Wrung/Boa Música)

#	Title	Performer(s)	Producer(s)	Time
1	"Mas Fuerte"	P.N.O & Rocca	P. Castro (DJ Nomad)	4:23
2	"A Criticarme"	Rocca & P.N.O	DJ Kodh	4:06
3	"Bang! Bang!"	Rocca & P.N.O Ft. Nancy Sinatra	Lee Hazlewood and Needlz	2:55
4	"Fake Records"	P.N.O & Rocca	P. Castro (DJ Nomad)	3:41
5	"Las 5 Reglas"	P.N.O & Rocca Ft. Macko	Artwell Smart	3:40
6	"Ya Olvidar"	P.N.O & Rocca Ft. Martinha	Pocho Pérez and P. Castro (DJ Nomad)	4:09
7	"Otra Historia"	P.N.O & Rocca	P. Castro (DJ Nomad)	2:33
8	"Entremos Al Party"	Rocca & P.N.O	Gallegos	3:53
9	"Venenosas"	P.N.O & Rocca Ft. Buju Banton		2:46
10	"New York"	P.N.O & Rocca Ft. Sergio Veneno	P. Castro (DJ Nomad)	4:39
11	"No Es Real"	Rocca & P.N.O Ft. Chavito	P. Castro (DJ Nomad)	3:22
12	"Para Los Que Entienden"	P.N.O & Rocca Ft. Eye-N-See	Midas	4:39
13	"Princesa"	P.N.O & Rocca	A.n.D (Armen & Lenny Barr) and Rocca	3:18
14	"Mi Tumbao (Remix)"	Rocca Ft. P.N.O and Michael Stuart	Rocca	4:07
15	"Así Es"	Rocca & P.N.O	Joe Reisman and Pete Rock	3:16
16	"Nació Latino (Tiraera Pa' Nas)"	Rocca & P.N.O	Jim Hilton and Will.i.am	3:39
17	"Arte"	P.N.O & Rocca Ft. Tote King	D2 and P. Castro (DJ Nomad)	4:18

- 2011: La Música Es Mi Arma (Audio Lírica Entertainment/Parcero Production)

#	Title	Performer(s)	Producer(s)	Time
1	"Aquí Llegamos"	Rocca & P.N.O	Rocca	3:59
2	"Este sistema"	Rocca & P.N.O	Lorenzo Rocca	4:52
3	"Consejo De Oro"	Rocca & P.N.O	Midas and Rocca	4:36
4	"Mi Tierra"	Rocca & P.N.O Ft. Johanna Castañeda	Rocca	4:39
5	"Mas Salvaje"	Rocca & P.N.O Ft. Puchungo	Rocca	4:42
6	"Somos Hip Hop"	P.N.O & Rocca Ft. Macko	P. Castro (DJ Nomad)	5:04
7	"Todo Bien"	P.N.O & Rocca	P. Castro (DJ Nomad)	3:06
8	"Caminando"	Rocca & P.N.O		3:52
9	"La Monedita"	Rocca & P.N.O Ft. Goyo	Lorenzo Rocca	3:24
10	"Me La Busco Como Sea"	Rocca & P.N.O	Gallegos	4:34
11	"Bang! Bang!"	Rocca & P.N.O Ft. Johanna Castañeda	Rocca	4:07
12	"Somos Hip Hop (Remix)"	Rocca & P.N.O Ft. Soprano	P. Castro (DJ Nomad)	4:53
13	"Mentira"	Rocca & P.N.O Ft. Héctor Lavoe	Rocca	3:03

- 2011: La Música Es Mi Arma: Deluxe Edition (Audio Lírica Entertainment/Parcero Production)

#	Title	Performer(s)	Producer(s)	Time
1	"Aquí Llegamos"	Rocca & P.N.O	Rocca	3:59
2	"Este sistema"	Rocca & P.N.O	Lorenzo Rocca	4:52
3	"Consejo De Oro"	Rocca & P.N.O	Midas and Rocca	4:36
4	"Mi Tierra"	Rocca & P.N.O Ft. Johanna Castañeda	Rocca	4:39
5	"Mas Salvaje"	Rocca & P.N.O Ft. Puchungo	Rocca	4:42
6	"Somos Hip Hop"	P.N.O & Rocca Ft. Macko	P. Castro (DJ Nomad)	5:04
7	"Todo Bien"	P.N.O & Rocca	P. Castro (DJ Nomad)	3:06
8	"Caminando"	Rocca & P.N.O		3:52
9	"La Monedita"	Rocca & P.N.O Ft. Goyo	Lorenzo Rocca	3:24
10	"Me La Busco Como Sea"	Rocca & P.N.O	Gallegos	4:34
11	"Bang! Bang!"	Rocca & P.N.O Ft. Johanna Castañeda	Rocca	4:07
12	"Somos Hip Hop (Remix)"	Rocca & P.N.O Ft. Soprano	P. Castro (DJ Nomad)	4:53
13	"Mentira (Album Version)"	Rocca & P.N.O Ft. Héctor Lavoe	Rocca	3:03

- Demo unpublished

#	Title	Performer(s)	Producer(s)	Time
1	"Real Soldados"	Reychesta & P.N.O	Spank	
2	"Aquí Llegamos"	Reychesta, Rocca & P.N.O	Artwell Smart	
3	"La Hacemos"	Rocca & P.N.O	TNB	
4	"Otro Día"	P.N.O, Rocca & Reychesta Ft. Negro Jetro	Artwell Smart	
5	"Vamos a Jugar"	Reychesta, Rocca, P.N.O and Kafu Banton	Layce and Owen Meese	3:16
6	"Lecciones"	P.N.O, Reychesta & Rocca	Artwell Smart	3:58
7	"New York"	P.N.O, Reychesta & Rocca	Artwell Smart	
8	"Las Pistolas"	Reychesta & P.N.O	Artwell Smart	3:20
9	"Cuáles"	Reychesta & P.N.O	Artwell Smart	2:36
10	"MC Killa"	Reychesta & P.N.O	Artwell Smart	2:57

== In solitary ==
=== Rocca ===
- 1997: Entre Deux Mondes (Arsenal Records/Barclay (record label)/Delabel Editions/Kouveau Deal Management)
- 2001: Elevación (Promo) (Barclay (record label)/Wrung/Lickshot Entertainment/Parcero Production/Grim Music)
- 2001: Elevación (Barclay (record label)/Wrung/Lickshot Entertainment/Parcero Production/Grim Music)
- 2003: Amor Suprême (Promo) (Barclay (record label)/Universal Music Group/Parcero Production/SCPP (Civil Society of Phonographic Producers)/Orchestra)
- 2003: Amor Suprême (Barclay (record label)/Universal Music Group/Parcero Production/SCPP (Civil Society of Phonographic Producers)/Orchestra)
- 2012: Le Calme Sous La Pluie (Musicast)
- 2013: El Chief: Mixtape (Vol. 1) (Street Trash Records)
- 2013: El Chief: Mixtape (Vol. 2) (Street Trash Records)
- 2015: Bogotá París (El Original Production/PIAS Recordings/Believe Digital/All French Distribution)
- 2023: Cimarrón (French Version) with Dj Duke (RIP)
- 2024: Cimarrón (Spanish Version) with Dj Duke (RIP)

=== P.N.O ===
- 1999: QWALIFIED (Correct Course Records)
- 2016: Mixed Blood: Mix-Tape (Audio Lírica Entertainment)

=== Reychesta ===
- 1998: Cliffhangaz con Mista Sinista, Shakim & A.B. Universal (Fat Beats Records)
- 2009: Tequendama (Live) with Radikal People & Callao Cartel (Legalize Records)
- 2011: El Underground Mixtape (Vol. 1) (Primera Corona Records/La Vega Entertainment)
- 2012: Mixtape U.S.A (Primera Corona Records/Chosen Few Emerald Entertainment, Inc./La Vega Entertainment)
- 2013: Yo Quiero Dinero: Mixtape (Primera Corona Records/La Vega Entertainment)
- 2013: Narco Rap Corridos: Mixtape with Capo C (Primera Corona Records)
- 2014: La Lista Negra (Primera Corona Records)
- 2016: Inferno (Trakblazers Entertainment)
- 2019: Los Gapvillanes: The Mixtape (Primera Corona Records/Baby BoyZz Incorporated)
- 2019: Equipo Armado: Mixtape with Bajito Exclusivo & Peso El Negro Latino (Baby BoyZz Incorporated)

== Other Distributions Made by Parcero Production ==
=== Macko ===
- 2004: Páginas De La Vida... (Makial Clan/Fun Shop)
- 2005: Mentes Libres (Vol. 2)
- 2007: De Vuelta a La Esencia: Mixtape (Makial Clan/Fun Shop)
- 2009: Substancia Explícita: Mixtape
