= Plan B (duo) =

Puerto Rican reggaeton duo

- Born: July 29, 1982 (age 44) (Maldy); February 19, 1979 (age 47) (Chencho)
- Origin: Guayama, Puerto Rico
- Genre: Reggaeton
- Years active: 1999–2018
- Labels: One Star; Genio; Boy Wonder; Pina; Sony Latin
- Members: Chencho; Maldy
- Website: www.PlanBLive.com at the Wayback Machine (archived March 12, 2016)

Plan B was a Puerto Rican reggaeton duo consisting of cousins Chencho (also known as Chencho Corleone) and Maldy. The duo rose to fame with the release of their first studio album, El Mundo del Plan B (2002), which also featured collaborations with fellow reggaetoneros like Daddy Yankee, Great Kilo, Guelo Star, Rey Pirin, and Speedy, among others. In addition to performing, Chencho and Maldy are both record producers in their own right; Chencho has his own record label, Chencho Records, and likewise Maldy heads Maldy Records. Plan B released their first mixtape in 2005, Los Nenes del Blin Blin ("the bling-bling boys"). They have featured two compilation albums, released in 2005 and 2007, respectively: El Draft 2005 and Reggaetón de Markesina. The duo released their third joint album in 2010, House of Pleasure, along with singles such as "Si No Le Contesto" and "Es un Secreto". Plan B released their fourth and final album in 2014, Love and Sex, and featured artists like Alexis & Fido, J Álvarez, Tego Calderón, Zion & Lennox, Clandestino y Yailemm, and Amaro.

In the years following Plan B's formal disbanding, Chencho and Maldy have continued creating music, having collaborated with many other artists within the reggaetón, urbano and Latin pop genres, including Dominican singer Natti Natasha ("Deja Tus Besos" remix) and Colombian artist Karol G ("Gatúbela"). Maldy joined Karol G in March 2023 for a live performance of "Gatúbela" during her sold-out stadium shows in San Juan, Puerto Rico. In 2024, he was featured on the collaborative track "Party Amanecío" ("partying at dawn") along with artists Bad Gyal, De La Ghetto and Ryan Castro, produced by DJ Luian and Mambo Kingz.

== Discography ==
=== Studio albums ===
- 2002: El Mundo del Plan B
- 2010: House of Pleasure
- 2014: Love & Sex

=== Compilation ===
- 2005: El Draft 2005
- 2007: Reggaeton de Markesina

==== Mixtapes ====
- 2005: Los Nenes del Blin Blin
- 2006: La Trayectoria
- 2007: Reggaeton de Markesina
- 2007: House of Pleasure: The Mixtape 2007
- 2007: Interstate 69: The Road to Pleasure (Hosted by DJ Sin-Cero)
- 2010: Live in Concert Tampa FL
- 2010: House of Pleasure: The Mixtape 2010

==== Collaboration albums ====
- 2005: El Draft 2005
- 2012: Plan B Society Presents: El Draft World Edition
- 2012: La Fórmula

=== Charting singles ===
Title	Year	US Latin	US Latin Pop	US Tropical	US Latin Rhythm
"Frikitona"	2006	41	—	16	14
"Solos"	2009	—	—	—	10
"No Se Ve"	2009	—	—	—	18
"Si No Le Contesto"	2010	38	26	6	17
"Es un Secreto"	2011	—	—	16	23
"¿Por Qué Te Demoras?"	2011	—	—	31	21
"Parisera"	2011	—	—	—	20
"Se Cree Mala"	2012	—	—	—	16
"Te Dijeron"	2012	39	19	2	5
"Amor de Antes"	2013	—	—	—	18
"Candy"	2013	31	—	28	9
"Zapatito Roto"	2013	30	19	30	5
"Pal Piso"	2013	—	—	—	18
"Choca"	2014	17	26	7	8
"Mi Vecinita"	2014	19	11	6	4
"Fanática Sensual"	2015	3	18	1	5
"Dónde Los Consigo?"	2015	—	—	—	25
"Fronteo"	2016	—	—	—	24
"Te Acuerdas de Mí"	2017	35	22	—	15
"—" denotes that a recording did not chart.

== Awards and nominations ==
=== Latin Grammy Awards ===
Year	Nominee / work	Award	Result	Ref.
2016	"A Donde Voy" (Cosculluela featuring Daddy Yankee) (Note: Chencho is nominated as songwriter.)	Best Urban Song	Nominated	

=== Billboard Latin Music Awards ===
Year	Nominee / work	Award	Result	Ref.
2016	Plan B	Latin Rhythm Songs Artist of the Year, Duo or Group	Nominated	
2016	Plan B	Latin Rhythm Albums Artist of the Year, Duo or Group	Won	
