= Lo Nuestro Award for Merengue Artist of the Year =

Latin music award

Lo Nuestro Award for Merengue Performance
- Awarded for: Best Merengue Performance
- Country: United States
- Presented by: Univision
- First award: 2001
- Currently held by: Héctor Acosta (2015)

Highlights
- Most awards: Olga Tañón (7)
- Most nominations: Elvis Crespo (9)
- Website: univision.com/premiolonuestro

The Lo Nuestro Award for Best Merengue Performance (or Lo Nuestro Award for Merengue Artist of the Year) was an honor presented annually by American network Univision. The Lo Nuestro Awards were first awarded in 1989 and has been given annually since to recognize the most talented performers of Latin music. The nominees and winners were originally selected by a voting poll conducted among program directors of Spanish-language radio stations in the United States and also based on chart performance on Billboard Latin music charts, with the results being tabulated and certified by the accounting firm Deloitte. At the present time, the winners are selected by the audience through an online survey. The trophy awarded is shaped in the form of a treble clef.

The award was first presented to Puerto-Rican American singer Elvis Crespo in 2001. Puerto-Rican American performer Olga Tañón holds the record for the most awards with seven, out of the same number of nominations, Crespo, Tañón and Dominican singer-songwriters Juan Luis Guerra and Héctor Acosta were the only performers awarded, with four, seven, three, and one wins, respectively. Grupo Manía are the most nominated performers without a win, with six unsuccessful nominations. In 2016 the category was discontinued.

== Winners and nominees ==
Listed below are the winners and nominees of the award for each year.

Key	Meaning
‡	Indicates the winner

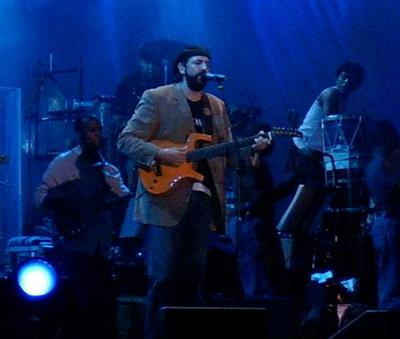
Dominican singer Juan Luis Guerra (pictured in 2005), winner in 2010, 2011 and 2013

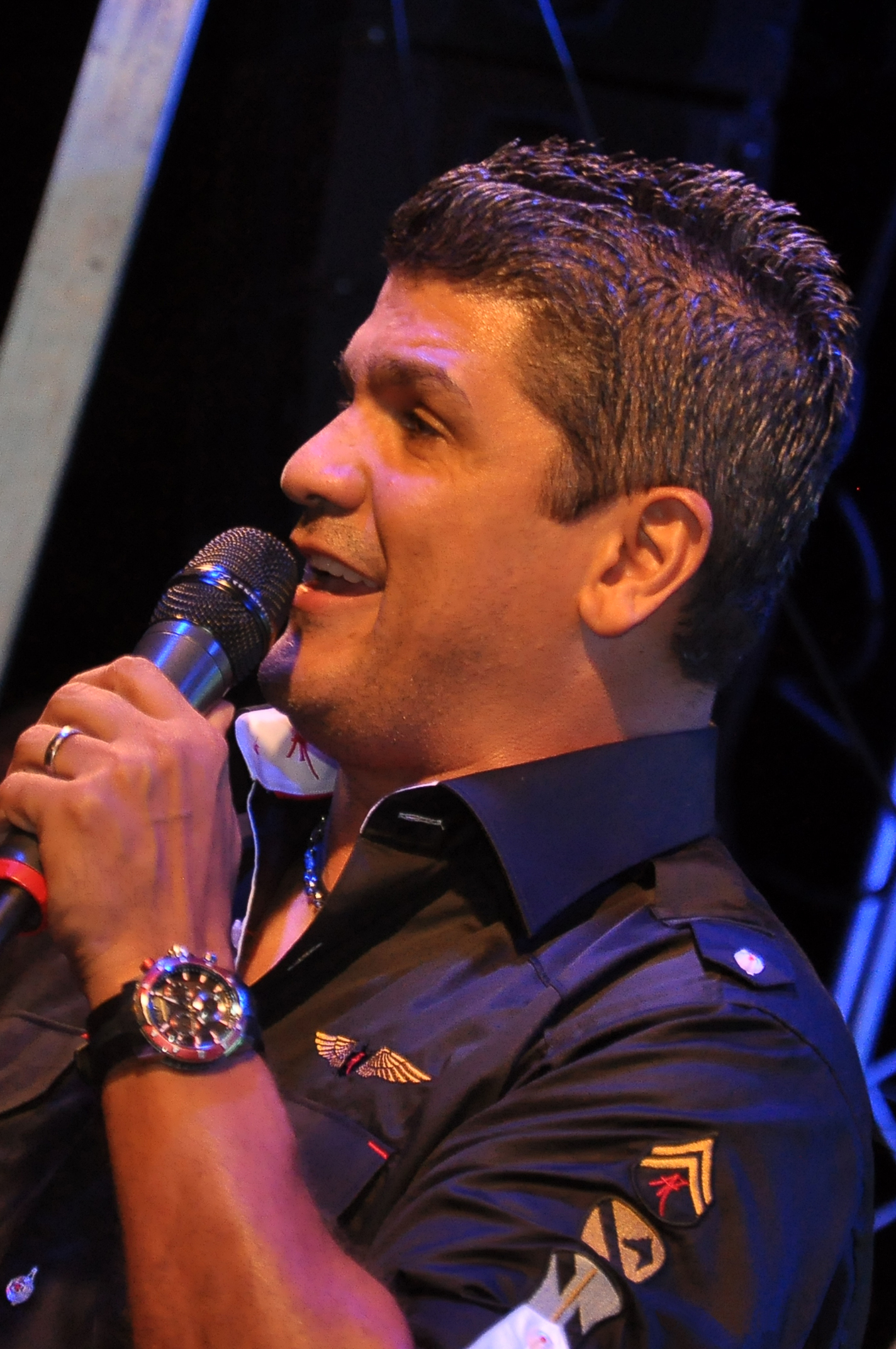
Dominican singer Eddy Herrera (pictured in 2012), three-time nominee

Year	Performer	Ref
2001 (13th)	Elvis Crespo‡	
2001 (13th)	Gisselle	
2001 (13th)	Ilegales	
2001 (13th)	Los Toros Band	
2002 (14th)	Olga Tañón‡	
2002 (14th)	Eddy Herrera	
2002 (14th)	Fulanito	
2002 (14th)	Grupo Manía	
2002 (14th)	Milly Quezada	
2003 (15th)	Elvis Crespo‡	
2003 (15th)	Fulanito	
2003 (15th)	Ilegales	
2003 (15th)	Oro Solido	
2004 (16th)	Olga Tañón‡	
2004 (16th)	Joseph Fonseca	
2004 (16th)	Limi-T 21	
2004 (16th)	Grupo Manía	
2005 (17th)	Elvis Crespo‡	
2005 (17th)	Grupo Manía	
2005 (17th)	Limi-T 21	
2005 (17th)	Los Toros Band	
2006 (18th)	Olga Tañón‡	
2006 (18th)	Juan Luis Guerra	
2006 (18th)	La Gran Banda	
2006 (18th)	Los Toros Band	
2007 (19th)	Olga Tañón‡	
2007 (19th)	Grupo Manía	
2007 (19th)	Limi-T 21	
2007 (19th)	Chichí Peralta	
2008 (20th)	Olga Tañón‡	
2008 (20th)	Elvis Crespo	
2008 (20th)	Juan Luis Guerra	
2008 (20th)	Toño Rosario	
2009 (21st)	Olga Tañón‡	
2009 (21st)	Elvis Crespo	
2009 (21st)	Juan Luis Guerra	
2009 (21st)	Los Hermanos Rosario	
2009 (21st)	Raúl Acosta and Oro Solido	
2010 (22nd)	Juan Luis Guerra‡	
2010 (22nd)	Elvis Crespo	
2010 (22nd)	Grupo Manía	
2010 (22nd)	Eddy Herrera	
2010 (22nd)	Rafely Rosario	
2011 (23rd)	Juan Luis Guerra‡	
2011 (23rd)	Grupo Manía	
2011 (23rd)	Limi-T 21	
2011 (23rd)	Omar Enrique	
2012 (24th)	Elvis Crespo‡	
2012 (24th)	Limi-T 21	
2012 (24th)	Los Hermanos Rosario	
2012 (24th)	Sohanny	
2013 (25th)	Juan Luis Guerra‡	
2013 (25th)	Elvis Crespo	
2013 (25th)	Eddy Herrera	
2013 (25th)	Juan Luis Juancho	
2014 (26th)	Olga Tañón‡	
2014 (26th)	Elvis Crespo	
2014 (26th)	Juan Luis Juancho	
2014 (26th)	Kalimete	
2015 (27th)	Héctor Acosta‡	
2015 (27th)	Elvis Crespo	
2015 (27th)	Grupo Treo	
2015 (27th)	Limi-T 21	

== Multiple wins/nominations ==
Number	Performer(s)
Wins
7	Olga Tañón
4	Elvis Crespo
3	Juan Luis Guerra
1	Héctor Acosta
Nominations
10	Elvis Crespo
7	Olga Tañón
6	Juan Luis Guerra
6	Limi-T 21
3	Grupo Manía
3	Eddy Herrera
3	Los Toros Band
2	Fulanito
2	Ilegales
2	Juan Luis Juancho
2	Los Hermanos Rosario
2	Oro Solido
1	Héctor Acosta

== See also ==
- Grammy Award for Best Merengue Album
- Grammy Award for Best Salsa/Merengue Album
- Latin Grammy Award for Best Contemporary Tropical Album
