= Latin Grammy Award for Best Merengue/Bachata Album =

- Awarded for: quality albums of the merengue and bachata music genre
- Country: United States
- Presented by: The Latin Recording Academy
- First award: 2000
- Currently held by: Eddy Herrera for Novato Apostador (2025)
- Website: latingrammy.com

The Latin Grammy Award for Best Merengue/Bachata Album is an honor presented annually at the Latin Grammy Awards, a ceremony that recognizes excellence and creates a wider awareness of cultural diversity and contributions of Latin recording artists in the United States and internationally.

The category is awarded for "vocal or instrumental Merengue and/or Bachata albums containing at least 51% playing time of newly recorded material". The award was originally presented as Best Merengue Album and established in 2000 before it was discontinued in 2007. The award was brought back with its current name in 2020 with the winner being a tie between Ahora by Eddy Herrera and Larimar by Daniel Santacruz.

Dominican singer Juan Luis Guerra is the most awarded artist in the category with four wins, followed by Milly Quezada and Sergio Vargas with two wins each. In 2023, the category results in a tie (the second in the category) between Fórmula, Vol. 3 by American singer Romeo Santos and A Mi Manera by Dominican singer Sergio Vargas.

== Winners and nominees ==
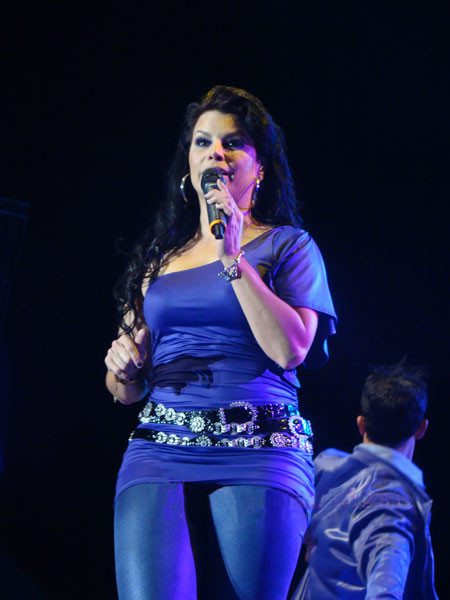
2002 winner Olga Tañon.

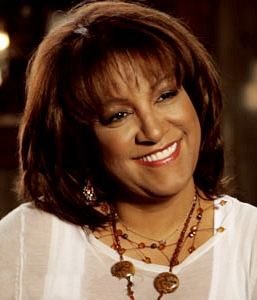
Two-time winner Milly Quezada.

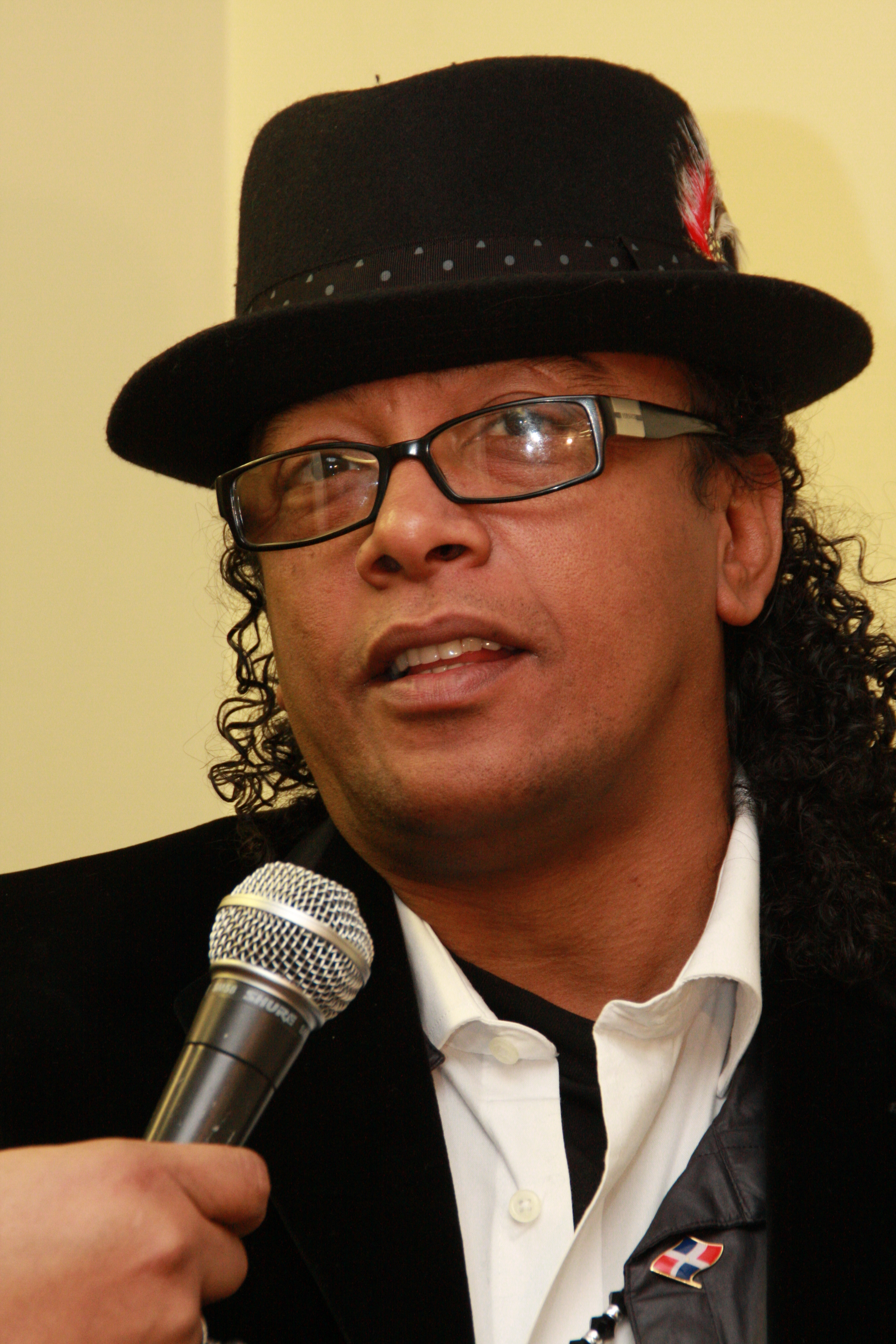
Two-time winner Sergio Vargas.

Year^{[I]}	Performing artist(s)	Work	Nominees	Ref.
2000	Juan Luis Guerra	Ni Es Lo Mismo Ni Es Igual	Elvis Crespo – Píntame; Grupo Manía – Masters of the Stage; Los Hermanos Rosario – Bomba 2000; Olga Tañón – Olga Viva, Viva Olga	
2001	Chichi Peralta	...De Vuelta al Barrio	Grupo Manía – Grupomania 2050; Eddy Herrera – Me Enamore; Manny Manuel – En Vivo!; Toño Rosario – Yo Soy Toño	
2002	Olga Tañón	Yo Por Tí	Eddy Herrera – Atrevido; Los Toros Band – Pa' La Calle; Kinito Méndez – A Palo Limpio; Fernando Villalona – Mal Acostumbrado	
2003	Milly Quezada	Pienso Así...	Elvis Crespo – Urbano; Grupo Manía – Latino; Los Hermanos Rosario – Swing a Domicilio; Kinito Méndez – Sigue Siendo El Hombre Merengue	
2004	Johnny Ventura	Sin Desperdicio	Alex Bueno – 20 Años Después; Gisselle – Contra la Marea; Grupo Manía – Hombres de Honor; Limi-T 21 – Como Nunca... Como Siempre	
2005	Elvis Crespo	Saboréalo	Los Toros Band – En Vivo 2004; Kinito Méndez – Celebra Conmigo; Ramón Orlando – Generaciones; Toño Rosario – Resistiré	
2006	Milly Quezada	MQ	Grupo Manía – La Hora de Verdad; Eddy Herrera – Amor de Locos; Limi-T 21 – Rankeo; Johnny Ventura – 103 Boulevard	
2007	Juan Luis Guerra	La Llave de Mi Corazón	Elvis Crespo – Regreso el Jefe; Limi-T 21 – Real Time; Kinito Méndez – Con Sabor a Mi; Toño Rosario – A Tu Gusto	
2020	Eddy Herrera	Ahora	José Manuel Calderón – The Genetics of Bachata; Manny Cruz – Bailando Contigo; Grupo Manía – Los Conquistadores	
2020	Daniel Santacruz	Larimar	José Manuel Calderón – The Genetics of Bachata; Manny Cruz – Bailando Contigo; Grupo Manía – Los Conquistadores	
2021	Sergio Vargas	Es Merengue ¿Algún Problema?	Alexandra – Bachata Queen; Manny Cruz – Love Dance Merengue; Luis Segura – El Papá de la Bachata, Su Legado (Añoñado I, II, III, IV); Fernando Villalona – Insensatez	
2022	Juan Luis Guerra	Entre Mar y Palmeras	Héctor Acosta "El Torito" – Este Soy Yo; Elvis Crespo – Multitudes; Milly Quezada – Resistirá; Olga Tañón – Tañon Pal' Combo es lo que Hay	
2023	Romeo Santos	Fórmula, Vol. 3	Manny Cruz – Cuatro26; Manny Manuel – Road Trip; Pavel Núñez – Trópico, Vol. 2	
2023	Sergio Vargas	A Mi Manera	Manny Cruz – Cuatro26; Manny Manuel – Road Trip; Pavel Núñez – Trópico, Vol. 2	
2024	Juan Luis Guerra 4.40	Radio Güira	Eddy Herrera – Agradecido Live!; Magic Juan – Superhéroe Merengue; Oscarito – Lo Tengo Todo; Prince Royce – Llamada Perdida	
2025	Eddy Herrera	Novato Apostador	Alex Bueno – El Más Completo; Milly Quezada – Milly Quezada - Live Vol. 1 Desde el Teatro Nacional de República Dominicana	

== See also ==
- Grammy Award for Best Merengue Album
