= Sigo Siendo Yo (disambiguation) =

Sigo Siendo Yo may refer to:

- Sigo Siendo Yo, 2006 album by Héctor Acosta
- Sigo Siendo Yo: Grandes Éxitos, 2006 greatest hits album by Marc Anthony
