= Simplemente... El Torito =

Studio album by Héctor Acosta
- Released: May 26, 2009
- Recorded: 2009
- Genre: Bachata; merengue
- Length: 47:26
- Label: D.A.M Pruduction Inc.; Venevision International Music; Universal Music Latino

Héctor Acosta chronology
| Mitad / Mitad (2008) | Simplemente... El Torito (2009) | The Ultimate Bachata Collection (2010) |

Singles from Simplemente... El Torito
- 1. "Tu Primera Vez" Released: 2009; 2. "Me Puedo Matar" Released: 2009; 3. "No Me Lloren" Released: 2010; 4. "Me Vio Lloar" Released: 2010

Professional ratings
Review scores
| Source | Rating |
|---|---|
| Allmusic | 3.5/5 stars |

Simplemente... El Torito (Simply... The Little Bull), is the third studio album by Héctor Acosta. It was released on May 26, 2009, by D.A.M Pruduction Inc, Venevision International Music, Universal Music Latino. The album featured collaborations from Bachata Heightz, Marcy Place, R.K.M & Ken-Y, and Don Omar.

== Track listing ==
| No. | Title | Length |
|---|---|---|
| 1. | "La Noche" | 4:04 |
| 2. | "Me Vió Llorar" | 3:41 |
| 3. | "Maldito E-Mail" (featuring Don Omar & Marcy Place) | 3:28 |
| 4. | "El Triste" | 3:30 |
| 5. | "Tu Primera Vez" | 4:00 |
| 6. | "Me Puedo Matar" (featuring Bachata Heightz) | 4:24 |
| 7. | "María Tomasa" | 3:40 |
| 8. | "No Me Lloren" | 3:46 |
| 9. | "Te Mando Flores" | 3:41 |
| 10. | "Me Duele El Alma" | 3:42 |
| 11. | "Dios Ha Sido Bueno" | 5:26 |
| 12. | "Tu Primera Vez" (Remix) (featuring R.K.M & Ken-Y) | 3:59 |
| Total length: | | 47:26 |

== Charts ==
=== Weekly charts ===
| Chart (2009) | Peak position |
|---|---|
| US Heatseekers Albums (Billboard) | 21 |
| US Top Latin Albums (Billboard) | 20 |
| US Tropical Albums (Billboard) | 2 |

=== Year-end charts ===
| Chart (2009) | Position |
|---|---|
| US Top Latin Albums (Billboard) | 75 |
| US Tropical Albums (Billboard) | 11 |
| Chart (2010) | Position |
| US Tropical Albums (Billboard) | 6 |

== Sales and certifications ==
| Region | Certification | Certified units/sales |
|---|---|---|
| United States (RIAA) | Gold (Latin) | 50,000^{^} |
^{^} Shipments figures based on certification alone.
