= Merengue Y Sentimiento =

Studio album by Héctor Acosta
- Released: October 16, 2015
- Recorded: 2014–2015
- Genre: Bachata; merengue
- Length: 49:52
- Label: D.A.M Pruduction Inc.
- Producer: DJ Nápoles

Héctor Acosta chronology
La Historia... Mis Exitos (2014)	Merengue Y Sentimiento (2015)	Los Número Uno (2019)

Singles from Merengue Y Sentimiento
- 1. "Ojalá" Released: 2014; 2. "O Te Vas o Me Voy Yo" Released: 2015; 3. "Es Urgente" Released: 2015; 4. "Amorcito Enfermito" Released: 2016

Merengue Y Sentimiento (Merengue And Feelings), is the sixth studio album by Héctor Acosta. It was released on October 16, 2015, by D.A.M Pruduction Inc. The album features Mexican band La Original Banda El Limón de Salvador Lizárraga (Salvador Lizárraga's Original Lemon Band) and Puerto Rican singer Manny Manuel. The album was nominated for Best Contemporary Tropical Album at the 17th Annual Latin Grammy Awards in 2016.

== Track listing ==
No.	Title	Length
1.	"La Fiesta Del Amor"	3:24
2.	"Ojalá"	3:44
3.	"Me Muero Por Ella" (Bachata Version) (featuring La Original Banda El Limón de Salvador)	3:54
4.	"El Calendario"	4:00
5.	"Es Urgente"	3:39
6.	"Vive Tu Vida"	3:39
7.	"Tu Maleta"	3:47
8.	"La Morena"	3:57
9.	"O Te Vas o Me Voy Yo"	3:42
10.	"Todo Se Lo Debo A El"	3:57
11.	"Me Muero Por Ella" (Banda Version) (featuring La Original Banda El Limón de Salvador)	3:54
12.	"El Mujerón" (featuring Manny Manuel)	4:24
13.	"Amorcito Enfermito"	3:50
Total length:		49:53
