= Oblígame =

Studio album by Héctor Acosta
- Released: October 19, 2010
- Recorded: 2010
- Genre: Bachata; merengue
- Length: 38:56
- Label: D.A.M Pruduction Inc.; Venevision International Music; Universal Music Latino

Héctor Acosta chronology
The Ultimate Bachata Collection (2010)	Oblígame (2010)	The Ultimate Merengue Collection (2011)

Singles from Oblígame
- 1. "Me Duele La Cabeza" Released: 2010; 2. "Aprenderé" Released: 2010; 3. "Me Llamas" Released: 2011; 4. "Que Vuelva Mi Morena" Released: 2011

Oblígame (Force Me), is the fourth studio album by Héctor Acosta. It was released on October 19, 2010, by D.A.M Pruduction Inc, Venevision International Music, Universal Music Latino. The album featured Mexican singer Alejandro Fernández.

== Track listing ==
No.	Title	Length
1.	"Catígame"	3:14
2.	"Me Duele La Cabeza"	3:54
3.	"Oblígame" (Bachata Version)	3:28
4.	"Rumba Buena"	3:26
5.	"Me Llamas"	3:28
6.	"Que Vuelva Mi Morena"	3:23
7.	"Aprenderé"	3:40
8.	"Dímelo Ahora"	3:23
9.	"Se Me Va La Voz" (Bachata Version) (featuring Alejandro Fernández)	3:18
10.	"Me Falla Todo"	3:31
11.	"Oblígame" (Balada Version)	4:00
Total length:		38:56

== Charts ==
=== Weekly charts ===
Chart (2010–11)	Peak position
US Heatseekers Albums (Billboard)	24
US Top Latin Albums (Billboard)	13
US Tropical Albums (Billboard)	2

=== Year-end charts ===
Chart (2011)	Position
US Top Latin Albums (Billboard)	60
US Tropical Albums (Billboard)	6

== Sales and certifications ==
Region	Certification	Certified units/sales
United States (RIAA)	Gold (Latin)	30,000^{^}
^{^} Shipments figures based on certification alone.
