= Sergio Vargas =

Dominican singer-songwriter (born 1960)

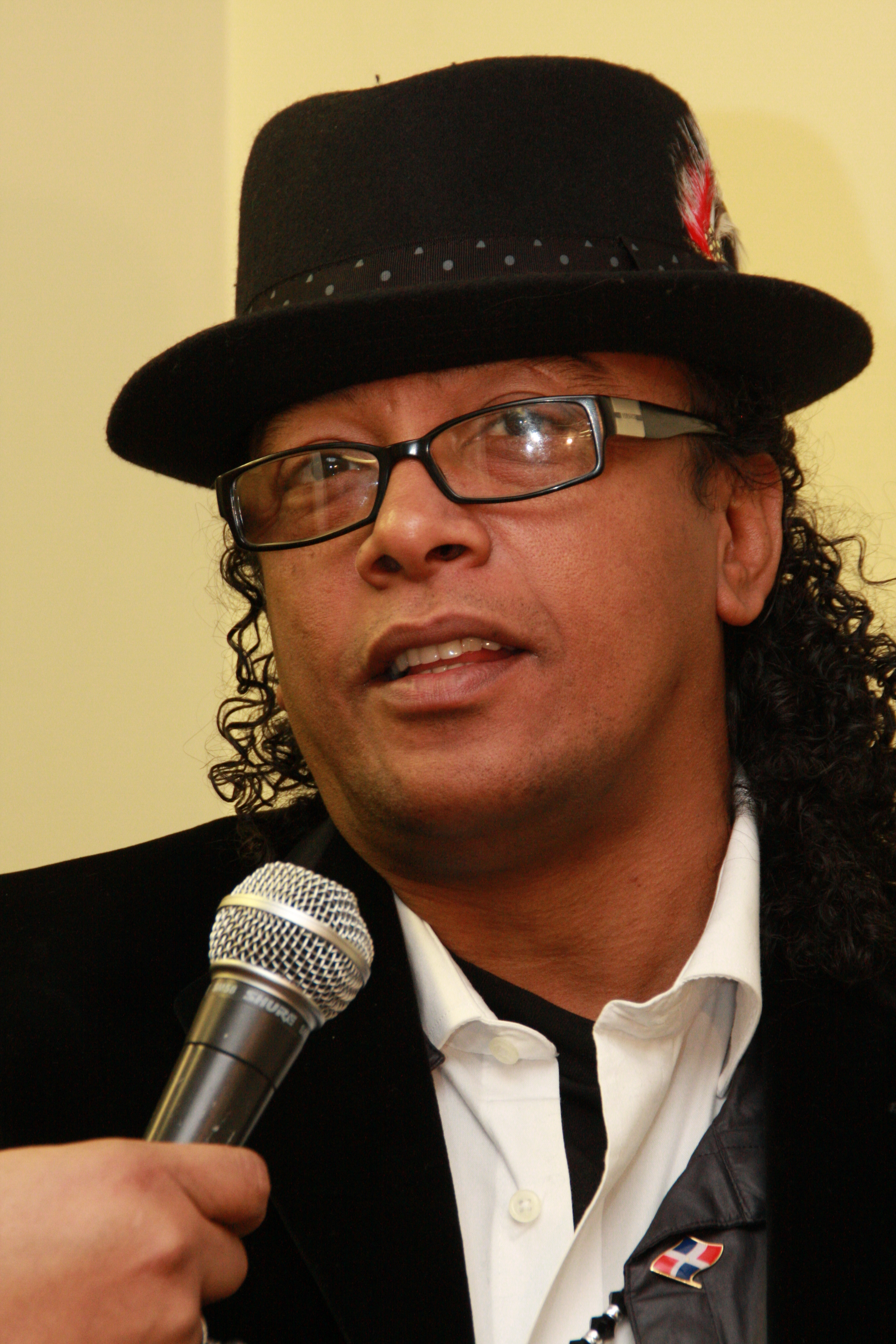
- Vargas in 2010

Background information
- Also known as: El Negrito de Villa
- Born: Sergio Pascual Vargas Parra; March 15, 1960 (age 66); Villa Altagracia, Dominican Republic
- Genre: Merengue
- Occupations: Singer; musician; songwriter
- Instruments: Vocals
- Years active: 1980–present
- Website: www.sergiovargas.com.do (in Spanish)

Deputy in the Chamber of Deputies of the Dominican Republic
- In office August 16, 2006 – August 16, 2010

Sergio Pascual Vargas Parra (born 15 March 1960) is a performer of merengue and bolero, who was very popular in the 80s and 90s, during the "Golden Age of Merengue" and today remains active as one of the leading figures in Dominican merengue. His brothers, Kaki and Johnny, are also performers of the genre and have been by his side for much of their respective musical careers.

Vargas was a deputy for the Dominican Liberation Party representing his people Villa Altagracia in the period 2006–2010.

== Career ==
Known as El negrito de Villa, Vargas participated in the Festival of the Voice organized by the Dominican musician Rafael Solano, where he finished second. Two years later in 1982, he became part of the Dionis Fernández orchestra. In this orchestra, Sergio came to perform great hits like "The designers", "To the rhythm of the night", "A man and a woman", among others. After this, Sergio went on to reinforce the orchestra "Los Hijos del Rey" as lead vocalist. This orchestra in its beginnings was led by Fernando Villalona and Raulín Rosendo. It was in this group that its popularity began to grow, so much so that the group had fan clubs in Puerto Rico, Venezuela, Panama and the East Coast of the United States.

In 1986 Sergio released his first LP under the Karen Records label. This LP includes the single "La quiero a morir" (I Love Her to Death), which is the Spanish version of "Je l'aime à mourir" by the French singer Francis Cabrel. The debut album of the same titled sold over 350,000 copies. In 1987 he recorded another album with Los Hijos del Rey titled "the earth quaked", with which he achieved great success. At the moment Sergio launched as a soloist, most of the musicians left with him, except for Diómedes Nuñez and shortly after Orvis García. The arrangements for this production are by Sonny Ovalles and his pianist Juan Valdez. The singles of this production are "Ciclón (indoor party)", "Marola", "On the other side of the sun", "Bamboleo", "This humble house", "Days of June" and "Black Pearl".

== Albums / LP ==
- I love her to death (1986)
- The Earth Trembled (1987)
- Cyclone (Festa do interior) (1988)
- The unconditional (1989)
- This is my country (1991)
- Bullfighter (1992)
- By H or by R (1993)
- The meringue is danced and danced (1994)
- Like a bolero (1994)
- Love Fraud (1995)
- Just Meringue (1995)
- My proposal (1996)
- Time of love (1997)
- Together (1998)
- On-time (1999)
- Once Upon a Meringue (1999)
- Another era (with Los Panchos) (1999)
- From Sergio Vargas to José Feliciano (2000)
- Go and tell him (2001)
- Bohemian Live (2003)
- Bohemian (2004)
- His successes in bachata (2004)
- New, old and half-used loves (2009)

=== Compilations ===
- The Golden Years (1994)
- The Best (1994)
- Brilliant (with Johnny Ventura) (1994)
- Musical history (1995)
- Success Story (1995)
- Face to face (with Johnny Ventura) (1997)
- The man and its meringue (1998)
- Big hits (1999)
- Meringue gold (2000)
- Series 2000 (2000)
- Between friends (with Fernando Villalona) (2000)
- Meringue (2001)
- 22 Ultimate Hits (2002)
- Together (2002)
- Gold Collection: 15 Successes (2002)
- Tropical Blue Series (2003)
- 15 Favorite Songs (2003)
- Diamond Collection (2004)
- Sabrosonas of the memory (2005)
- 20 years are nothing (2005)
- 20 original hits (2005)
- 2 great voices of Quisqueya the beautiful (with Eddy Herrera) (2007)
- Collectible 10 (2007)
- A singer, 3 facets, a great artist (2008)
- My favorites (2010)
- Face to face (with Toño Rosario) (2013)
- Great voices of the century collection

== Songs ==
With the Children of the King

- For her
- My pride
- A Man and a Woman
- Je l'aime à mourir (I love her to death)
- Oh Mariana
- The earth quaked
- Let's leave it
- If you ever see her

With Dionis Fernández & Orquesta

- The designers
- To the rhythm of the night

With The Singer Arena

- Is not easy

As soloist

- Marola (written by Luis Días)
- The earth quaked
- The vampires
- Girlfriend
- Too bad for so much love
- Ragdoll (salsa)
- The little window
- Heart of stone
- The pill
- tell him
- Sorrows to the wind
- Magic
- A cigarette, the rain and you
- Like a bolero
- Women
- Neither you nor I
- Bad memory
- Oh my god
- What have you believed
- Lost bullet
- Go and tell
- What's up sweetheart
- It is going to hurt you
- Last night we talked about love
- Tell me where
- My brunette

=== Covers ===
- Je l'aime à mourir, (by the French singer Francis Cabrel)
- Bamboléo (from the Spanish flamenco group Gipsy Kings)
- This humble house (by the Brazilian singer Roberto Carlos)
- Black Pearl (from the Venezuelan singer Yordano)
- The unconditional (from singer Luis Miguel)
- I try to forget you (played by Nicaraguan Hernaldo Zúñiga); composed by Manuel Alejandro.
- Bullfighter (with José Alberto "El Canario"; original song by Julio Iglesias and José Luis Rodríguez)
- Until you forget me (performed by Luis Miguel and written by Juan Luis Guerra)
- Oh! woman (originally performed by Juan Luis Guerra)
- Scandal (played by Javier Solís)
- Forgive me, forget it (with Gisselle; originally performed by [[Juan Gabriel and Rocío Dúrcal)
- To say goodbye (with Gisselle; originally performed by José Feliciano and Ann Kelly)
- That which you gave me (interpreted by Alejandro Sanz)
- El negrito del Batey (played by Alberto Beltrán)
- The Broken Cup (originally performed by José Feliciano)
- After you what? (originally performed by José Feliciano)
- Why do I have to forget you? (originally performed by José Feliciano)
- Tell Me Heart (originally performed by Amaury Gutiérrez)
- What once was will not be (originally performed by José José)
- I live for her (originally performed by Andrea Bocelli and Marta Sánchez]])
- To live (composed and performed by Pablo Milanés)

== Achievements ==
In 2018 he received the Great Sovereign during the celebration of the 2018 Sovereign Awards, where he thanked his award with a speech in favor of education for Dominican musicians.

In 1988 he was awarded by the Association of Art Writers of the Dominican Republic with a Cassandra (nowadays known as sovereign awards) for his concert titled Sergio. This concert was awarded as a show of the year. Sergio Vargas also won the Casandra award for the best video clip for the song "Las vampires" by the composer Luis Días.

In 1989 CBS International offered him a record deal. After much contemplation, he left Karen Records and signed with CBS.

In 1991 it was a very productive year for Sergio Vargas' career; after participating in the television program "This is my country" he was awarded the Casandra (today called sovereign awards) award. He also received the Casandra award for his international projection and singing in places like New York's Madison Square Garden in front of 20,000 spectators at the Merengue Carnival. Under the direction of producer and director Jean Louis Jorge. Sergio shot a special program for Sony Music International.

In 1993 he received a gold record, and was also one of the singers who participated in the famous Eight Street Festival in the city of Miami.

In 2018 in the largest demonstration held to artists in the Dominican Republic called awards Cassandra (nowadays known as sovereign awards). Sergio Vargas had a special participation in the awards. After the participation, they gave him the recognition as THE GREAT SOVEREIGN (artist of greatest importance in the Dominican Republic and internationally).

In 2021, Vargas won the Latin Grammy Award for Best Merengue/Bachata Album.

Sergio is recognized as a prominent artist associated with the "Homeland", and his ensemble is considered one of the most active orchestras in its field. He has achieved popularity in multiple Colombian cities, including Cali, Bogotá, Santa Marta, Cúcuta, Ocaña and Medellín, where he is regarded as a notable figure in merengue music. His influence has extended to local institutions; for example, accommodations in the Chipichape area of Cali have reportedly been named in his honor.

== Golden Congos ==
Awarded at the Barranquilla Carnival Orchestra Festival at the Barranquilla Carnival:

Year	Nominee	Genre	Result
2014	Sergio Vargas	Merengue	Ganador

== Activism ==
During the term of Hipólito Mejía (2000–2004), Sergio Vargas decided to stop cutting his hair in protest until the government fixed all the streets of his hometown Villa Altagracia. To this day, Sergio still has his long hair, for Sergio, not cutting his hair is a symbol of a Revolutionary and he always has his roots in mind and the constant struggle for Villa Altagracia to be recognized as what he is today.
