= Sophy Hernández =

Puerto Rican singer and show host

Sophy de Puerto Rico (born December 15, 1950, in Aguadilla, Puerto Rico), better known as Sophy, Sophy de Puerto Rico and La Sophy, is a Puerto Rican singer and show host. A member of the Puerto Rican new wave movement, Hernandez scored several hits during the 1970s and 1980s, including "Que Sabe Nadie", "De Mujer a Mujer" and a Spanish cover of the Debarge song "Rhythm of the Night".

Her television show, "Sophy, al Ritmo de la Noche" ("Sophy's Rhythm of the Night"), debuted in 2015 on Telemicro Internacional and was seen across Latin America and on parts of Africa.

== Early life ==
She was born in the northwestern Puerto Rican coastal city of Aguadilla. As a little girl, she and her family moved to the nearby city of San Sebastian.

== Career ==
As a teenager, Sophy qualified to be shown singing on canal 4's television show "Show de las 12"'s "La Nueva Ola" section, which was produced by Tommy Muniz, gaining Hernández initial celebrity in her country.

Around 1967, Hernández moved to the United States' city of New York, New York as she was hired by Tito Puente, the legendary Puerto Rican musician, to participate in his orchestra as a singer. Hernández participated on Puente's television show, "Tito Puente y su Mundo Latino" ("Tito Puente and his Latin World"), which was transmitted weekly from channel 47 in Newark, New Jersey. Puente thereafter produced Sophy's first album, titling it "Tito Puente Presenta, con Orgullo....Sophy!" ("Tito Puente Proudly Introduces Sophy!"), which was a Tico Productions record and yielded, in 1970, the first major hit for Sophy, "La Ultima Palabra" ("The Last Word").

In Puerto Rico at the time, she was represented by Gaspar Pumarejo of WAPA-TV, channel 4.

Sophy's second album was also released in 1970 and produced by Tito Puente and Tico Records. It was titled "Te Reto" ("I Challenge You"). In 1972, she was signed by Velvet Records, a major musical label of the time.

1973 was a major year for Hernández; she first released an album which yielded three major Puerto Rican radio hits, "Te Apuesto" ("I Bet You"), "Será, Será" ("Whatever Will Be, Will Be") and Christmas celebration theme "Los Reyes Magos" ("Three Wise Men"). Her second album that year was named "Yo Soy Mujer....y no Soy Una Santa" ("I'm a woman...But Not a Saint"), which had major hits such as "Cancion Para Una Esposa Triste" ("A Sad Wife's Song"), which became a number one hit on Puerto Rican radio, and, according to reporter Javier Santiago, made her the "undisputed Caribbean music album market queen".

Following a series of other hits, such as "Usted ya me Olvido" ("You Already Forgot About Me"), "Despertaras Llorando" ("You Will Cry For me When You Wake Up") and "Me Muero Por Estar Contigo" ("I'd Die to be With You"), Hernández took up residence at the Caribe Hilton Hotel in Puerto Rico's capital city of San Juan, and had a series of concerts at Teatro Tapia, also in San Juan. Sophy also performed at San Juan's Centro de Bellas Artes and the San Juan Hotel during this era.

Next, Hernández embarked on an international tour which saw her visit countries such as Mexico, Haiti, the Dominican Republic, Ecuador, Venezuela and the United States. In the Dominican Republic, she and Fausto Rey sang in front of 30,000 fans at Santo Domingo's Estadio Olimpico Stadium.

In Panama, Sophy headlined concerts at Teatro Nacional and in the United States, she performed at the Madison Square Garden. 1980 turned out to be another huge year for Sophy: she released an album which included one of her best internationally known songs, the major hit "Que Sabe Nadie?" ("What no One Knows About") and received an award by Billboard en Espanol. She was also named Grand marshal of the Puerto Rican Day's parade in New York City.

Sophy diversified her repertoire during the 1980s, with a salsa song named "De Mujer a Mujer" ("From One Woman to Another"), neofolklore songs "Una Estrella Pura" ("A Pure Star") and "Palabras del Ausente" ("An Absent Person's Words, written by Tite Curet Alonso), and a Willie Colón produced album named "Sophy en Nueva York". Sophy then recorded a merengue version of Debarge's major pop-rock hit, "Rhythm of the Night". "El Ritmo de la Noche", Sophy's Spanish version of "Rhythm of the Night", was adapted into that language by the famous singer and composer, fellow Puerto Rican Lou Briel.

Continuing her successful career, Sophy enjoyed success in the Dominican Republic with songs like "Se ve y se va" ("He's Seen and Then Leaves"). "Marinero" ("Seaman"), "10 Noviembres" ("10 Novembers") and a collaboration with Johnny Ventura, the legendary Dominican singer, the latter song named "No lo Dejes Caer" ("Don't Let Him Fall").

In 1987, Sophy was signed by CBS Records. She recorded hand in Portuguese and entered in the Brazilian market and did some remixes of her merengue songs but did not last long with that record company: by the early 1990s, she left Sony, the owners of CBS Records, and joined Forum Records, an independent record company, with which she recorded "Esta Soy Yo" ("This is me"), an album. Sophy, as the first Puerto Rican singer who succeeded in merengue with "Al ritmo de la noche", then released a new album named "Un Lado Aparte" ("A Side Apart") for Combo Records, which was another indie record company. Her next album, "Tributo a Grandes Voces" ("Tribute to Great Voices"), was dedicated to some of the most famous Latin singers in history, such as Virginia López, Agustin Lara, Lucho Gatica, Lino Borges, Bobby Capo, Javier Solis, Tona la Negra, Felipe Lara, Pedro Infante, Jose Feliciano, Roberto Yaňez, Los Angeles Negros and Gilberto Monroig.

Through her career, Hernández has also been interviewed on television several times, including on a Veronica Castro show in Mexico, a Mirtha Legrand and an Andrés Percivale one in Argentina, Sabado Gigante and the Cristina Saralegui ones at Univision in the United States and much more.

== Book ==
During 2009, she wrote an autobiographical book, named "Sophy de Puerto Rico... Desde lo más íntimo; el poder de luchar para triunfar". In 2021, Sophy relaunched her autobiography.

== Personal life ==
Sophy was married, during the early 1980s, to Peruvian-Puerto Rican singer David Dali; the couple divorced after two years.

== Honors ==
Hernandez has been honored several times, including, in 2024, by the Oficina Nacional de Derecho del Autor (National Office of Author Rights, or "ONDA") of the Dominican Republic among much more.

== See also ==
- List of Puerto Ricans
