= Mitad / Mitad =

Studio album by Héctor Acosta
- Released: April 15, 2008
- Recorded: 2007–2008
- Genre: Bachata; merengue
- Length: 50:19
- Label: D.A.M Pruduction Inc.; Venevision International Music; Machete Music

Héctor Acosta chronology
Sigo Siendo Yo (2006)	Mitad / Mitad (2008)	Simplemente... El Torito (2009)

Singles from Mitad / Mitad
- 1. "Sin Perdón" Released: 2008; 2. "Con Que Ojos" Released: 2008; 3. "Me Voy (Remix)" Released: 2008

Mitad / Mitad (Half / Half), also titled as Mitad Mitad, is the second studio album by Héctor Acosta. It was released on April 15, 2008, by D.A.M Pruduction Inc, Venevision International Music, and Machete Music. The album included the singles Sin Perdón and Con Que Ojos. The album featured collaborations from the rap group El Pueblo and American bachata singer Romeo Santos.

== Track listing ==
Standard
No.	Title	Length
1.	"Dominicano Donde Quiera"	4:37
2.	"Pa´Casarme"	4:11
3.	"Esencia"	3:52
4.	"El Merengue"	3:47
5.	"Entrégate"	3:51
6.	"Con Que Ojos"	4:16
7.	"Sin Perdón"	4:05
8.	"Se Olvida, Se Olvida"	4:03
9.	"Me Duele El Alma"	3:42
10.	"Paz En La Tormenta"	5:42
Total length:		42:11

Bonus Track
No.	Title	Length
11.	"Mil Cartas" (with El Pueblo)	4:01
Total length:		46:18

12 Tracks Edition
No.	Title	Length
12.	"Me Voy" (Remix) (featuring Romeo Santos)	4:01
Total length:		50:19

Enhanced CD - Music Videos
No.	Title	Length
1.	"Sin Perdón"	4:05
2.	"Con Que Ojos"	4:41
3.	"Primavera Azul"	4:10

== Charts ==
Chart (2008)	Peak position
US Top Latin Albums (Billboard)	62
US Tropical Albums (Billboard)	5

== Sales and certifications ==
Region	Certification	Certified units/sales
United States (RIAA)	Gold (Latin)	30,000^{^}
^{^} Shipments figures based on certification alone.
