= Me Voy (Aventura song) =

Song by Aventura

Song by Aventura

from the album Love & Hate
- Released: November 18, 2003 (album release)
- Recorded: 2003
- Genre: Merengue Típico
- Length: 4:10
- Label: Premium Latin Music
- Songwriter: Anthony Santos

"Me Voy"

Single by Héctor Acosta remix featuring Romeo Santos

from the album Sigo Siendo Yo remix from the album Mitad / Mitad
- Released: December 9, 2006; 2008 (remix)
- Recorded: 2006; 2007 (remix)
- Genre: Bachata
- Length: 4:01
- Label: Hector Acosta & Orquesta S. A.; D.A.M Pruduction Inc.; Venevision International Music; Universal Music Latino
- Songwriter: Anthony Santos

Héctor Acosta singles chronology
"¿Cómo Me Curo?" (2006)	"Me Voy" (2006)	"Sin Perdón" (2008)

"Me Voy " (English: "I'm Leaving") is a song by the American music group Aventura with the participation of Dominican musician El Prodigio. It is the eleventh track from their third studio album Love & Hate (2003). Despite being a bachata group, it is a merengue song.

== Héctor Acosta version ==
In 2006, Dominican singer Héctor Acosta released a cover in bachata of the song as a single for his debut solo album, Sigo Siendo Yo (2006). The song became a huge success and one of Acosta's signature songs. On September 1, 2007, Acosta performed the song with Aventura at their sold-out Madison Square Garden concert. It is featured in the group's third concert film and live studio album, Kings of Bachata: Sold Out at Madison Square Garden (2007). In 2008, Acosta released a remix with the group's lead singer Romeo Santos as a remix of the bachata cover and it is part of Acosta's second studio solo album, Mitad / Mitad (2008).

== Chart performance ==
Chart performance for "Me Voy" (Remix)
Chart (2007–08)	Peak position
US Hot Latin Songs (Billboard)	47
US Latin Rhythm Airplay (Billboard)	23
US Tropical Airplay (Billboard)	15
