= Con El Corazón Abierto =

Studio album by Héctor Acosta
- Released: August 21, 2012
- Recorded: 2011–2012
- Genre: Bachata; merengue
- Length: 43:23
- Label: D.A.M Pruduction Inc.; Venevision International Music; Universal Music Latino

Héctor Acosta chronology
| The Ultimate Merengue Collection (2011) | Con El Corazón Abierto (2012) | La Historia... Mis Exitos (2014) |

Singles from Con El Corazón Abierto
- 1. "No Soy Un Hombre Malo" Released: 2012; 2. "Tu Veneno" Released: 2012; 3. "Levántate" Released: 2012; 4. "No Moriré" Released: 2013; 5. "Para Llegar A Donde Estoy" Released: 2014

Con El Corazón Abierto (With An Open Heart), is the fifth studio album by Héctor Acosta. It was released on August 21, 2012, by D.A.M Pruduction Inc, Venevision International Music, Universal Music Latino. The album featured Mexican-American singer Pepe Aguilar.

== Track listing ==
| No. | Title | Length |
|---|---|---|
| 1. | "Por Un Beso" | 3:14 |
| 2. | "Tu Veneno" | 3:41 |
| 3. | "Para Llegar A Donde Estoy" | 3:52 |
| 4. | "El Mejor" | 3:44 |
| 5. | "No Soy Un Hombre Malo" | 3:38 |
| 6. | "Dos Gardenias" | 2:49 |
| 7. | "Lo Nuestro Es Tradición" | 3:29 |
| 8. | "No Moriré" | 3:57 |
| 9. | "Nadie Apostó Por Nosotros" | 4:02 |
| 10. | "Perdóname" (featuring Pepe Aguilar) | 3:24 |
| 11. | "Levántate" | 3:08 |
| 12. | "Mi Trabajo Es Creer" | 4:29 |
| Total length: | | 43:23 |

== Charts ==
=== Weekly charts ===
| Chart (2012) | Peak position |
|---|---|
| US Heatseekers Albums (Billboard) | 33 |
| US Top Latin Albums (Billboard) | 16 |
| US Tropical Albums (Billboard) | 3 |

=== Year-end charts ===
| Chart (2012) | Position |
|---|---|
| US Tropical Albums (Billboard) | 14 |
| Chart (2013) | Position |
| US Tropical Albums (Billboard) | 12 |
