= Grammy Award for Best Merengue Album =

Music award category

The Grammy Award for Best Merengue Album was awarded from 2000 to 2003. In its first year the award was titled Best Merengue Performance. In 2004 this award was combined with the award for Best Salsa Album as the Grammy Award for Best Salsa/Merengue Album.

Years reflect the year in which the Grammy Awards were presented, for works released in the previous year.

== Recipients ==
| Year | Winner | Nominations |
|---|---|---|
| 2003 | Latino by Grupo Manía | Mal Acostumbrado by Fernando Villalona; Calle Sabor, Esquina Amor by Limi-T 21; Manny Manuel by Manny Manuel; Pienso Así... by Milly Quezada |
| 2002 | Yo Por Tí by Olga Tañón | Haciendo Travesuras by Chico Malo; 8 by Gisselle; Grupomania 2050 by Grupo Manía; Yo Soy Toño by Toño Rosario |
| 2001 | Olga Viva, Viva Olga by Olga Tañón | El Padrino by Fulanito; Voy a Enamorarte by Gisselle; Masters of the Stage by Grupo Manía; Live by Ilegales |
| 2000 | Píntame by Elvis Crespo | Atada by Gisselle; The Dynasty by Grupo Manía; Encontré el Amor by Jailene; Lleno de Vida by Manny Manuel |

== See also ==
- Grammy Award for Best Salsa Album
- Grammy Award for Best Salsa/Merengue Album
- Grammy Award for Best Tropical Latin Album
- Latin Grammy Award for Best Merengue Album
