= Y Es Fácil! =

Y Es Fácil

Studio album by Los Hermanos Rosario
- Released: April 22, 1997
- Genre: Merengue
- Label: Karen

Los Hermanos Rosario chronology
Los Dueños del Swing (1995)	Y Es Fácil (1997)	Bomba 2000 (1999)

Singles from Y Es Fácil
- 1. "Y Es Fácil" Released: 1997; 2. "Rompecintura" Released: 1997

Y Es Fácil (And It's Easy) is a studio album recorded by Dominican Republic merengue group Los Hermanos Rosario released on April 22, 1997.

== Track listing ==
Y Es Fácil! track listing
No.	Title	Writer(s)	Length
1.	"Fin de Semana"	René Solís	4:19
2.	"Besos Robados"	D.R.S.	4:02
3.	"Detelengao (El Baile)"	Rafa Rosario, Tony Rosario, René Solís	3:42
4.	"Collar de Perlas"	D.R.S.	4:16
5.	"Y Es Fácil"	Alexis Morillo	3:52
6.	"Chica Pum"	Henry H.	4:32
7.	"La Candelosa"	Tony Rosario, René Solís	4:06
8.	"Rompecintura"	Félix Veloz	4:10
9.	"Llorando Una Pena"	Freddy Reyes	4:09
10.	"Dígale Que No"	René Solís	4:16
11.	"Amor de Madrugada"	Juan Agli	4:18
12.	"Ella Se Fue"	Luis Rosario	4:11
13.	"Y Volviste"	Consefor Rosario	3:46
14.	"No Puedo Vivir"	Rafa Rosario	3:49
15.	"Fin de Semana" (Bonus track)	René Solís	4:19

== Charts ==
Chart (1997)	Peak position
US Top Latin Albums (Billboard)	19
US Tropical Albums (Billboard)	1

== Certification ==
Region	Certification	Certified units/sales
United States (RIAA)	Platinum (Latin)	100,000^{^}
^{^} Shipments figures based on certification alone.

== See also ==
- List of Billboard Tropical Albums number ones from the 1990s
