= Fausto Rey =

- Also known as: El Niche, El Rey Negro de la Cancion Dominicana, El Baladista del Siglo, La Fiera...
- Born: Fausto Ramón Sepúlveda; December 1, 1951 (age 74); Higuey, Dominican Republic
- Genres: tropical
- Occupation: singer
- Instrument: vocals
- Years active: 1969–present
- Labels: 4Points, Phillips, Fania, Sonidiscos

Fausto Ramón Sepúlveda (born December 1, 1951, in Higuey), known by his stage name Fausto Rey, is a Dominican singer.

Rey is predominantly known as a crooner, with a versatile range including romantic ballads, boleros, waltz, salsa, merengue, bossa nova, blues, and jazz. He plays electric or acoustic guitar on many of his recordings, and also plays bass, piano and percussion.

== Life ==
Born to Cristrobalina Sepúlveda, Rey was adopted by her husband Secundino De Aza, who was of Indian origin. Antolín Soler, Rey's biological father and a noted Dominican güira player, had little or no contact with his son in his early years, but they have since established a relationship.

Rey worked as a shoeshine boy as a child, selling saint's images, candy, cornbread cooked by his mother, and tickets for the National Lottery. As a youth, he attended Sunday concerts in the park of his hometown municipal band. In his teens, he lived in La Romana. He won several talent shows, formed a rock group called Los Magnéticos, and performed with another group in Santo Domingo called Brahmins.

Rey got his break with Johnny Ventura's orchestra, subsequently becoming one of the Dominican Republic's most popular singer-songwriters of the 1970s, and was signed by the Cuban recording producer Marcos Garcia, owner of the Montilla Records label, the forerunner to 4Points Records. He began his recording career with Garcia, recording his first album of romantic tracks in Buenos Aires, Argentina. He went back to Argentina every year to record with musical arrangers including Raul Parentella, Bubby Lavecchia, Jorge Calandrelli, Oscar Cardoso Ocampo, and Horacio Malvicino. He moved to Fania Records to record two musical productions: El Amor es Natural, recorded in Buenos Aires and produced by Fabian Ross, and La Responsabilidad with Larry Harlow and orchestra, produced by Harlow. After leaving his contract with Fania Records by mutual agreement, Fausto Rey recorded a romantic album called El Nido del Amor, and a duo production with Dominican singer Rafael Colón, both produced by Rey himself.

After a break from recording for several years, Rey establishes a Merengue orchestra under his own name, in association with producers George and Mike Rodriguez, owners of the Sonidiscos label from the Dominican Republic. This project had numerous hits, including "El Pájaro Herido", which became the #1 hit of the year and won the award for Record of the Year at the annual awards from the El Dorado Academy. The second merengue production by Fausto Rey y su Orchestra included the tracks "De qué 'e que priva Maria?", "Brindemos más Amor", and "Se Va la Vida".

During the early 1980s, he and Puerto Rican singer Sophy Hernández had a concert in which they sang in front of 30,000 fans at Estadio Olimpico in Santo Domingo.

Fausto Rey now lives in the Dominican Republic and performs regularly in the United States. He has made television appearances in Argentina, Chile, Puerto Rico, Venezuela, Colombia, Haiti, Cuba and Panama. Fausto Rey performs each year in the Dominican Republic, and was the first Dominican singer to attract an audience of 17,000 people as a soloist in a concert of his romantic music.

== Discography ==
- Fausto Rey (1970)
- Fausto Rey II (1971)
- Fausto Rey III (1972)
- El Cuarto Álbum (1973)
- Fausto Rey V (1974)
- Latino (1975)
- El Amor Es Natural (1977)
- La Responsabilidad (1979)
- Rafael Colón y Fausto Rey Interpretan a Juan Lockward (1982)
- Mi Linda Música (1984)
- La Fiera (1985)
- La Orquesta Más Completa! (1986)
- Sus Éxitos (1994)
- El Disco de Oro (1997)
- Bachata a Media Voz (1998)
