= Rayando El Sol =

Studio album by Manny Manuel
- Released: August 17, 2010
- Genre: Latin
- Length: 42:07
- Language: Spanish
- Label: Universal Music Latino

Manny Manuel albums chronology
Tengo Tanto (2007)	Rayando El Sol (2010)

Rayando El Sol is the ninth studio album by Puerto Rican singer-songwriter Manny Manuel, released by Universal Music on August 17, 2010. The album covers the songs by Mexican rock band, Maná.

== Track listing ==
No.	Title	Writer(s)	Length
1.	"De Pies A Cabeza"	Alex González, Fher Olvera	4:28
2.	"Vivir Sin Aire"	Olvera	4:52
3.	"Labios Compartidos"	Olvera	4:45
4.	"Cachito"	González, Olvera	3:26
5.	"Oye Mi Amor"	González, Olvera	3:45
6.	"Rayando El Sol"	González, Olvera	4:04
7.	"Mariposa Traicionera"		4:19
8.	"Bendita Tu Luz"	Olvera, Sergio Vallin	4:03
9.	"En El Muelle De San Blás"	González, Olvera	4:12
10.	"Si No Te Hubieras Ido"	Marco Antonio Solís	4:13

== Charts ==
Chart (2010)	Peak position
U.S. Billboard Top Latin Albums	3
U.S. Billboard Tropical Albums	1

== See also ==
- List of number-one Billboard Tropical Albums of 2010
