= Héctor Acosta =

Héctor Acosta may refer to:

- Héctor Acosta (cyclist) (1933–1973), Argentine Olympic cyclist
- Héctor Acosta (footballer, born 1991), Mexican footballer
- Héctor Acosta (footballer, born 2000), Venezuelan footballer
- Héctor Acosta (singer) (born 1967), Dominican musician
