= Está de Moda =

Studio album by Grupo Mania
- Released: December 10, 1996
- Studio: AQ-30 Studio, Bayamon, Puerto Rico
- Genre: Merengue
- Length: 40:53
- Language: Spanish
- Label: Sony Discos
- Producer: Héctor Serrano

Grupo Mania chronology
Dance Manía (1995)	Está de Moda (1996)	Alta Honor (1997)

Singles from Está de Moda
- 1. "Linda Eh" Released: 1996; 2. "A Que Te Pego Mi Mania" Released: 1997; 3. "Deja Que la Gente Diga" Released: 1997

Está de Moda (In Style) is the fourth studio album by Puerto Rican merengue band Grupo Manía released on December 10, 1996. It topped the Billboard Tropical Albums. The album contains the lead single "Linda Eh", written by Elvis Crespo, which topped the Tropical Airplay chart where it spent four weeks on this position. The track won a BMI Latin Award in 1998. Two other singles from the album, "A Que Te Pego Mi Mania" and "Deja Que la Gente Diga" became a top-ten hit on the Tropical Airplay chart. This would be the final album before Crespo left the group to launch his own solo career.

== Track listing ==
No.	Title	Writer(s)	Length
1.	"La Condena"	Rodolfo Barreras	4:23
2.	"A Que Te Pego Mi Mania"	Eddy Garcia D' Oleo	04:06
3.	"Traigo Algo Bueno"	Oscar Serrano	3:52
4.	"Nadie"	Armando Larrinaga	4:03
5.	"Pa' Bajo y Pa'l Frente"	Banchy Serrano	3:42
6.	"Linda Eh"	Elvis Crespo	4:10
7.	"La Voy a Conquistar"	Raldy Vázquez	4:37
8.	"Hacer el Amor con Deseo"	O. Serrano	4:54
9.	"Deja Que la Gente Diga"	O. Serrano	3:07
10.	"El Cristal de Mis Pupilas"		3:59

== Charts ==
=== Weekly charts ===
Chart (1996)	Peak position
US Top Latin Albums (Billboard)	9
US Tropical Albums (Billboard)	1

=== Year-end charts ===
Chart (1997)	Peak position
US Top Latin Albums (Billboard)	49
US Tropical Albums (Billboard)	5

== See also ==
- List of Billboard Tropical Albums number ones from the 1990s
