= Tengo Tanto =

Studio album by Manny Manuel
- Released: 11 September 2007
- Genre: Pop, Latin, tropical
- Length: 35:00
- Label: Universal Music
- Producer: Andres Castro

Manny Manuel chronology
Nostalgia (2004)	Tengo Tanto (2007)	Rayando el Sol (2010)

Singles from Tengo Tanto
- 1. "No Me Hagas Sufrir" Released: 2007; 2. "Se me Olvido" Released: 2008; 3. "Yo Voy A Darte" Released: 2008

Tengo Tanto is an album recorded by Puerto Rican singer Manny Manuel. The album was released on 11 September 2007, in Puerto Rico and North America by Universal Music. The first single from the album was "No Me Hagas Sufrir" (English: Don't Make Me Suffer). The second single was "Se me Olvido".

== Music video ==
The video for "No Me Hagas Sufrir" premiered worldwide on the program Al Rojo Vivo con Maria Celeste. In New Orleans, the tropical interpreter shows vocal maturity in his new musical proposal. With the historic centre of the city as a stage, Manny Manuel filmed video of the song "No Me Hagas Sufrir".

== Track listing ==
1. "Fuego" - 3:51
2. "Dejame Saber" - 3:03
3. "Se Me Olvido" - 3:24
4. "Yo Voy A Darte" - 3:30
5. "Tengo Tanto" - 3:24
6. "Sin Remedio" (ft. Chenoa) - 3:21
7. "A Una Mujer" - 3:55
8. "Ay Bendito" - 3:49
9. "La Fiesta" - 3:09
10. "No Me Hagas Sufrir" - 3:33
