= Amorcito Enfermito =

2016 single by Héctor Acosta

Single by Héctor Acosta

from the album Merengue Y Sentimiento
- Released: November 3, 2016
- Genre: Bachata
- Length: 3:50
- Label: D.A.M Pruduction Inc.; Maseta Inc.
- Songwriter: Romeo Santos

Héctor Acosta singles chronology
"Es Urgente" (2015)	"Amorcito Enfermito" (2016)	"Mala Suerte (Remix)" (2018)

Music video
- "Amorcito Enfermito" on YouTube

"Amorcito Enfermito" (English: "Sick Sweetheart") is a song by Dominican singer Héctor Acosta. The song was released as the thirteenth and final track of his sixth studio album Merengue Y Sentimiento (2015). It was later released as a single on November 3, 2016. The music video was released on YouTube on December 21, 2016. The song was awarded Bachata of the year at the 2017 Soberano Awards. The song has also become a successful meme as people use the last line of the song that goes "Se Murió" ("It Died") on videos.

== Charts ==
Chart (2016)	Peak position
Dominican Republic Bachata (Monitor Latino)	2
Dominican Republic General (Monitor Latino)	9
US Tropical Airplay (Billboard)	1

== See also ==
- List of number-one Billboard Tropical Songs of 2016
