= Sigo Siendo Yo =

Studio album by Héctor Acosta
- Released: October 24, 2006 (Standard); March 25, 2009 (Special Edition)
- Recorded: 2005–2006
- Genre: Bachata; merengue
- Length: 39:51
- Label: Hector Acosta & Orquesta S. A.; D.A.M Pruduction Inc.; Venevision International Music; Universal Music Latino

Héctor Acosta chronology
Tipico (2004)	Sigo Siendo Yo (2006)	Mitad / Mitad (2008)

Singles from Sigo Siendo Yo
- 1. "Primavera Azul" Released: 2006; 2. "¿Cómo Me Curo?" Released: 2006; 3. "Me Voy" Released: December 9, 2006

Sigo Siendo Yo (I Continue Being Me) is the first solo studio album by Héctor Acosta. It was released on October 24, 2006, by D.A.M Pruduction Inc. It includes the singles "Primavera Azul" and "Me Voy". A special edition was released on March 25, 2009, by Venevision International Music and Universal Music Latino.

== Track listing ==
Standard
No.	Title	Length
1.	"Lo Que Tiene Ella"	3:36
2.	"La Novia"	3:24
3.	"¿Cómo Me Curo?"	4:00
4.	"Vive La Vida"	4:20
5.	"Deguanangue"	4:04
6.	"Primavera Azul"	4:10
7.	"Me Voy"	4:01
8.	"Olvida Corazón"	4:07
9.	"Soy Yo (La Canción del Elegido)"	3:47
10.	"Demasiado Mujer"	4:18
Total length:		39:51

Enhanced CD - Music Videos
No.	Title	Length
1.	"Primavera Azul"	4:10
2.	"Me Voy"	4:01
3.	"Mil Cartas"	3:53

== Charts ==
Chart (2006)	Peak position
US Tropical Albums (Billboard)	19
