= Fello Suberví =

Dominican politician (1942–2025)

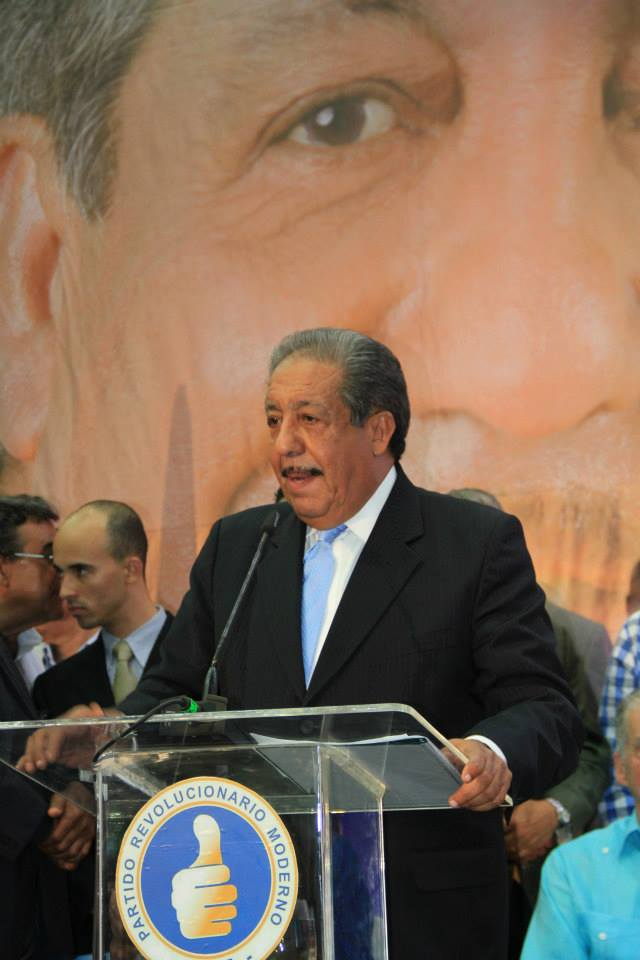
- Suberví in 2016

Mayor of Santo Domingo
- In office 16 August 1994 – 16 August 1998
- Preceded by: Rafael Corporán de los Santos
- Succeeded by: Johnny Ventura
- In office 16 August 1986 – 16 August 1990
- Preceded by: José Francisco Peña Gómez
- Succeeded by: Rafael Corporán de los Santos

Member of the Chamber of Deputies of the Dominican Republic
- In office 16 August 1998 – 16 August 2000
- In office 16 August 1990 – 16 August 1994

Personal details
- Born: Rafael Antonio Suberví Bonilla; 6 July 1942; Barahona, Dominican Republic
- Died: 15 July 2025 (aged 83); Santo Domingo, Dominican Republic
- Political party: PRD
- Education: Universidad Autónoma de Santo Domingo
- Occupation: Lawyer

Rafael Antonio "Fello" Suberví Bonilla (Spanish: [rafaˈel anˈtonjo feʎo suβeɾˈβi βoˈniʎa]; 6 July 1942 – 15 July 2025) was a Dominican politician. A member of the Dominican Revolutionary Party, he served as mayor of Santo Domingo from 1986 to 1990 and from 1994 to 1998. He also served in the Chamber of Deputies from 1990 to 1994 and again from 1998 to 2000.

Suberví died in Santo Domingo on 15 July 2025, at the age of 83.
