= Este Soy Yo =

Studio album by Héctor Acosta
- Released: May 20, 2022
- Recorded: 2018–2022
- Genre: Bachata; merengue
- Length: 34:14
- Label: La Oreja Media Group, Inc.
- Producer: Isaías Leclerc; Chris Hierro; Robinson Hernández

Héctor Acosta chronology
Los Número Uno (2019)	Este Soy Yo (2022)

Singles from Este Soy Yo
- 1. "Antes del Lunes" Released: 2019; 2. "Yo Sé" Released: 2020; 3. "Pa' Que Me Perdones" Released: 2021; 4. "Pecador" Released: 2022

Este Soy Yo (This Is Me), is the seventh studio album by Héctor Acosta. It was released on May 20, 2022, by La Oreja Media Group. The album is supported by the singles "Antes del Lunes", "Yo Sé", "Pa' Que Me Perdones", and "Pecador". The album was nominated for Best Merengue/Bachata Album at the 23rd Annual Latin Grammy Awards in 2022.

== Track listing ==
No.	Title	Length
1.	"Una En Un Millón"	3:21
2.	"Antes del Lunes"	3:42
3.	"La Boda"	3:41
4.	"Lamento"	4:10
5.	"Yo Sé"	4:03
6.	"Ya Fué Bastante"	3:50
7.	"Pecador"	3:41
8.	"Pa' Que Me Perdones"	3:51
9.	"La Segunda Planta"	3:51
Total length:		34:14
