= We Broke the Rules =

2002 studio album by Aventura

Studio album by Aventura
- Released: July 2, 2002
- Genres: Bachata; pop; R&B; hip-hop; rock; merengue; salsa
- Length: 45:42
- Label: Premium Latin Music

Aventura chronology
Generation Next (2000)	We Broke the Rules (2002)	Love & Hate (2003)

Singles from We Broke the Rules
- 1. "Amor De Madre" Released: May 27, 2002; 2. "Obsesión" Released: August 12, 2002; 3. "Todavía Me Amas" Released: November 4, 2002; 4. "Enséñame A Olvidar" Released: January 13, 2003

We Broke the Rules is the second studio album by the American band Aventura, released on July 2, 2002, by Premium Latin music. On the album, Aventura incorporated elements of pop, hip hop, and R&B into bachata, giving what critics thought was a new flavor to the genre and extending its appeal to those who preferred urban music styles.

The album introduces to the mainstream a new style of bachata known as "the New York school", or "urban bachata", characterized by the inclusion of electric guitars instead of acoustic, and lyrics in Spanish and English instead of just Spanish. In addition, the singing style takes after R&B melodies. The album's themes mainly included heartbreak and melancholy, although it also included social themes like in "Amor de Madre", or "Mother's Love", which is a song describing the lifelong struggle of a prostitute and her son.

The album was a commercial success selling over 1.5 million of copies worldwide. Aventura became the first bachata act to land a No. 1 single, in Spanish, in virtually every European territory. The lead single "Obsesión" featuring Judy Santos, remained in the number one position in the French top 100 singles charts for seven weeks and at number one in the Italian top 50 singles chart for 16 weeks. The album peaked inside of Austria, Belgium, Portugal and Netherlands album charts and peaked at number one in France and Italy albums charts.

== Cultural influence ==
Bachata music developed in the Dominican Republic during the 1960s and 1970s. It was a regional music primarily performed and heard by lower class males. The style is traditionally performed using acoustic guitars, bongos, and maracas. In the article review published in January 2005 called "Bachata: Music of the People", there is an important observation of the similarities between bachata and the blues. The article states: "Some have described Bachata music as the Dominican equivalent of blues music in the U.S. Both styles of music came out of struggling communities and gradually gained acceptance among middle and even upper classes." The album Bachata Rosa, released on December 11, 1990, by Juan Luis Guerra, marked the beginning of a new acceptance of bachata among the middle and high socio-economical classes. Almost ten years later, with the release of We Broke the Rules, Bachata became as internationally famous as merengue and even salsa. Despite Guerra's efforts, most Dominicans still thought of Bachata as music for illiterate, poor people from the rural areas of the Dominican Republic. Bachata also carried the stigma of being the preferred music in brothels, colmados, and cabarets, a connotation that kept bachata in the lowest level of all music genres in the Dominican Republic. In "Bachata", Deborah Pacini Hernandez describes bachata as "the blacksheep of the country's music business". Aventura helped change the general opinion about bachata because as young and "hip" New Yorkers, they did not fit the stereotype of bachateros but embraced the genre and identified themselves with it anyway. Along with Monchy & Alexandra, Aventura put a fresh face on the genre and revitalized it. Besides altering bachata's sound, Aventura also changed its image. Aventura also influenced a new generation of urban bachateros, such as Prince Royce, Toby love, Xtreme, and Carlos y Alejandra, who sing, dress, and play in a similar style as Aventura.

== Singles ==
While "Obsesión" is seen as the only single from this album, there were actually four singles that supported it. The other three were "Todavía Me Amas", "Amor De Madre", and "Enséñame A Olvidar". The story behind these singles is that they were leaked before it was ever released. Romeo Santos explained in the documentary Romeo Santos: King of Bachata that the group had recorded a few songs for the second album. He gave a few friends copies of the songs. Somehow the songs were leaked and then they started to expand, especially the song "Obsesión". He also mentioned this in an interview with the Breakfast Club. However, he claimed that he and the other members of the group had leaked it themselves without the record label's permission.

== Other credits ==
The other contributors to the album We Broke the Rules include: musicians Miguel Echavarria (tambora, bongo drum, and Sammy Puntiel (guira); audio mixer Monchy Jiminez; and photographer Manuel Sierra.

== Legal Issues ==
Aventura and their label Premium Latin Music, Inc. were sued for $50,000 because of flipping the main melody of "Axel F" by Harold Faltermeyer in their song Perdi El Control. The issue was resolved by removing the song off the album, and replacing it with "Cuándo Volverás" from their previous album. The song is still available on original physical copies of the album. It was also available digitally as it was released as a single in 2022, but it was shortly removed.

== Track listing ==
All tracks are written by Anthony "Romeo" Santos, except where noted.

Original Edition
No.	Title	Writer(s)	Translation	Length
1.	"Obsesión" (featuring Judy Santos)		"Obsession"	4:14
2.	"I Believe" (featuring Toby Love)		"Yo Creo"	4:37
3.	"Todavía Me Amas"		"You Still Love Me"	4:43
4.	"Perdí El Control"		"I Lost Control"	4:06
5.	"Amor De Madre"		"A Mother's Love"	6:02
6.	"Gone" (featuring Toby Love)	Justin Timberlake; Wade Robson		4:26
7.	"Mi Puerto Rico"		"My Puerto Rico"	3:49
8.	"Enséñame A Olvidar"		"Show Me How to Forget"	5:52
9.	"9:15 (Nueve & Quince)"		"Nine Fifteen"	4:22
10.	"Obsesión (English Remix)" (featuring Judy Santos)		"Obsession (English Remix)"	4:10
Total length:				45:42

Re-Release
No.	Title	Translation	Length
4.	"Cuando Volverás"	"When Will You Come Back"	3:30

Sample credits

- "Perdi El Control" samples "Axel F" by Harold Faltermeyer
- "I Believe (Yo Creo)" contains an interpolation of "Smooth Criminal" by Michael Jackson

=== DVD ===
In 2004, they released a DVD named after the album.

DVD
No.	Title	Translation	Length
1.	"Cuando Volverás" (Video)	"When Will You Come Back"	5:57
2.	"Obsesión" (Video)	"Obsession"	4:14
3.	"Amor De Madre" (Video)	"A Mother's Love"	6:02
4.	"Rep. Dom." (Concert) (Highlights)	Dom. Rep.
5.	"Babalú, NY" (Concert) (Highlights)
6.	"United Palace" (Concert) (Preview)
7.	"Behind The Scenes"
8.	"El Grupo"	The Group
9.	"United Palace" (Extra)

== Charts ==
=== Weekly charts ===
Chart (2002–04)	Peak position
Austrian Albums (Ö3 Austria)	18
Belgian Albums (Ultratop Flanders)	29
Belgian Albums (Ultratop Wallonia)	17
Dominican Albums (Musicalia)	6
Dutch Albums (Album Top 100)	23
French Albums (SNEP)	1
German Albums (Offizielle Top 100)	12
Italian Albums (FIMI)	1
Portuguese Albums (AFP)	8
Spanish Albums (Promusicae)	47
Swiss Albums (Schweizer Hitparade)	4
US Top Latin Albums (Billboard)	56
US Tropical Albums (Billboard)	5

=== Year-end charts ===
Chart (2004)	Position
Belgian Albums (Ultratop Flanders)	100
Belgian Albums (Ultratop Wallonia)	82
Dutch Albums (Album Top 100)	90
French Albums (SNEP)	41
Swiss Albums (Schweizer Hitparade)	7
Chart (2021)	Position
US Tropical Albums (Billboard)	20
Chart (2022)	Position
US Tropical Albums (Billboard)	12

== Certifications ==
Certifications for We Broke the Rules
Region	Certification	Certified units/sales
France (SNEP)	2× Gold	200,000^{*}
Portugal (AFP)	Silver	10,000^{^}
Switzerland (IFPI Switzerland)	Platinum	40,000^{^}
^{*} Sales figures based on certification alone.^{^} Shipments figures based on certification alone.
