= Love & Hate (Aventura album) =

Studio album by Aventura
- Released: November 18, 2003 (U.S.)
- Recorded: 2003
- Genres: bachata; pop; hip hop; R&B
- Length: 1:01:31
- Label: Premium Latin Music

Aventura chronology
We Broke the Rules (2002)	Love & Hate (2003)	Unplugged (2004)

Singles from Love & Hate
- 1. "Hermanita" Released: September 15, 2003; 2. "Llorar" Released: May 31, 2004

Professional ratings
Review scores
Source	Rating
Allmusic	3/5 stars

Love & Hate is the third album released by Bachata group Aventura released on November 18, 2003, by Premium Latin Music. The album's production is based on bachata with elements of Hip Hop and R&B, similar to the bands previous studio albums. It is considered the band's album with the most songs that contains social messages including "Hermanita" and "Papi Dijo".

Sales figure were lower in comparison of their previous album We Broke The Rules. However, The album success helped to consolidate the band's position on the mainstream and Latin music industry. The album peaked at the Top 5 at US Billboard Tropical Albums and charted inside of Spain, Italy and France albums charts. It was certified platinum (Latin field) by RIAA in the United States and Switzerland. Love & Hate was nominated for Album of the Year at Premios Lo Nuestro 2005. Eventually, the band won Tropical Duo or Group of the year at the same ceremony.

== Singles ==
The first single, "Hermanita", was released in 2003. It's a song about domestic violence in which the male voice talks to his little sister about her abusive relationship and his sadness. It peaked at number 33 on the Billboard Hot Latin Songs chart and at number 3 on the Billboard Tropical Songs chart. The music video was released in 2004.

The second single, "Llorar" was released in 2004. It peaked at number 8 on the Billboard Tropical Songs chart.

In 2004, the songs Mi Niña Cambió and La Guerra, which featured Judy Santos, were released as singles in Europe.

== Track listing ==
Standard Edition
No.	Title	Translation	Length
1.	"Intro"		2:05
2.	"La Película"	"The Movie"	5:29
3.	"Hermanita"	"Little Sister"	4:35
4.	"Mi Niña Cambió"	"My Girl Has Changed"	4:31
5.	"Pueblo Por Pueblo"	"Town By Town"	3:38
6.	"I'm Sorry"		4:12
7.	"Déjà Vu"		4:22
8.	"Conciencia"	"Conscience"	3:54
9.	"Llorar"	"Cry"	4:07
10.	"Papi Dijo"	"Daddy Said"	4:04
11.	"Me Voy"	"I'm Leaving"	4:10
12.	"Te Invito"	"I'm Inviting You"	3:31
13.	"Aventura"	"Adventure/Aventura"	3:49
14.	"La Guerra" (featuring Judy Santos)	"The War"	3:25
Total length:			57:19

Hidden Track
No.	Title	Length
15.	"Don't Waste My Time"	4:12
Total length:		1:01:31

- In the original version of the album, "Don't Waste My Time" is a hidden track inside the song "La Guerra" ("The War").

Germany Bonus Track
No.	Title	Translation	Length
16.	"Obsesión" (Dance Remix) (featuring Judy Santos)	"Obsesion"	5:39
Total length:			1:07:10

Special Edition 2004 (Italy Exclusive)
No.	Title	Translation	Length
1.	"Intro"		2:05
2.	"Cuando Volverás" (Edit 2004)	"When Will You Come Back"	3:05
3.	"Hermanita"	"Little Sister"	4:35
4.	"Mi Niña Cambió"	"My Girl Has Changed"	4:31
5.	"Pueblo Por Pueblo"	"Town by Town"	3:38
6.	"I'm Sorry"		4:12
7.	"Déjà Vu"		4:22
8.	"Conciencia"	"Conscience"	3:54
9.	"La Película"	"The Movie"	5:29
10.	"Llorar"	"Cry"	4:07
11.	"Papi Dijo"	"Daddy Said"	4:04
12.	"Me Voy"	"I'm Leaving"	4:10
13.	"Te Invito"	"I'm Inviting You"	3:31
14.	"Aventura"	"Adventure/Aventura"	3:49
15.	"La Guerra" (featuring Judy Santos)	"The War"	3:25
16.	"Don't Waste My Time"		4:12
17.	"Cuando Volverás" (Spanglish Version)	"When Will You Come Back"	3:30
18.	"Obsesión" (Radio Mix) (featuring Judy Santos)	"Obsesion" (Radio Mix)	4:05
19.	"Traccia Rom" (PC-Mac Compatibile)	"ROM Track" (PC-Mac Compatible)
Total length:			1:12:11

Special Edition 2005 (Romania Exclusive)
No.	Title	Translation	Length
1.	"Intro"		2:05
2.	"Obsesión" (featuring Judy Santos)	"Obsesion"	4:12
3.	"Cuando Volverás"	"When Will You Come Back"	3:05
4.	"La Película"	"The Movie"	5:29
5.	"Hermanita"	"Little Sister"	4:35
6.	"Mi Niña Cambió"	"My Girl Has Changed"	4:31
7.	"Pueblo Por Pueblo"	"Town by Town"	3:38
8.	"I'm Sorry"		4:12
9.	"Déjà Vu"		4:22
10.	"Conciencia"	"Conscience"	3:54
11.	"Llorar"	"Cry"	4:07
12.	"Papi Dijo"	"Daddy Said"	4:04
13.	"Me Voy"	"I'm Leaving"	4:10
14.	"Te Invito"	"I'm Inviting You"	3:31
15.	"Aventura"	"Adventure/Aventura"	3:49
16.	"La Guerra" (featuring Judy Santos)	"The War"	3:25
17.	"Don't Waste My Time"		4:12
18.	"Cuando Volverás" (Dance Remix)	"When Will You Come Back" (Dance Remix)	4:52
Total length:			1:13:40

== Chart performance ==
=== Weekly charts ===
Chart (2004)	Peak position
French Albums (SNEP)	127
Italian Albums (FIMI)	13
Spanish Albums (Promusicae)	94
Swiss Albums (Schweizer Hitparade)	3
US Top Latin Albums (Billboard)	66
US Tropical Albums (Billboard)	4

=== Year-end charts ===
Chart (2004)	Position
Swiss Albums (Schweizer Hitparade)	10

== Sales and certifications ==
Region	Certification	Certified units/sales
Switzerland (IFPI Switzerland)	Platinum	40,000^{^}
United States (RIAA)	Platinum (Latin)	100,000^{^}
^{^} Shipments figures based on certification alone.
