= Ivette Cintron =

Puerto Rican singer and businesswoman

Ivette Cintron is a Puerto Rican model and merenque singer. From 1991 to 1997, she was married to the legendary Dominican merenque singer, Toño Rosario.

== Business career ==
Cintron is also a businesswoman, and beautician, having once owned a beauty salon and a seafood restaurant called El Atlántico in Cataño, Puerto Rico. She lived in a mansion in Bayamon, Puerto Rico.

== Celebrity and musical career ==
She began her career in modeling by winning contests and participating in shows and artistic groups. Due in part to her divorce from Rosario, Cintron became a mainstream celebrity in her native Puerto Rico during the 1990s. She also launched a musical career, releasing some CDs.

== Personal life ==
Cintron and Rosario were married from 1991 to 1997. The couple has a son named Antonio Rosario Jr. She was also married to a man named Jimmy Solis.

== See also ==
- List of Puerto Ricans
