= Johnny Ventura =

Dominican singer (1940–2021)

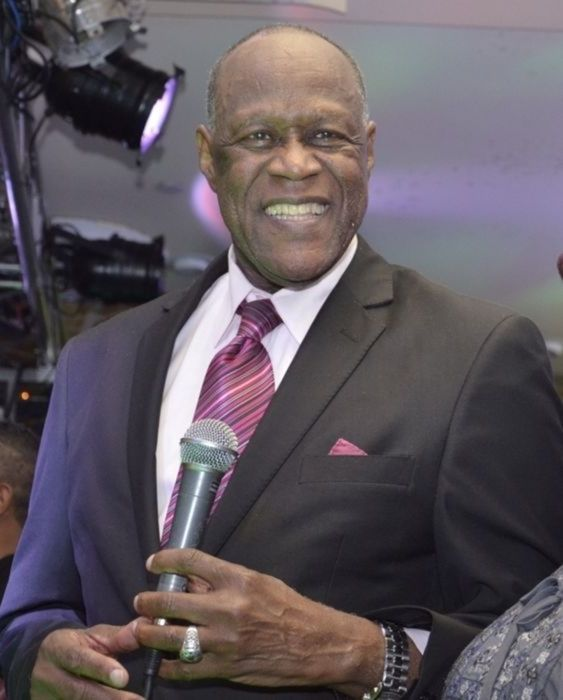
- Ventura in November 2011
- Born: Juan de Dios Ventura Soriano; 8 March 1940; Santo Domingo, Dominican Republic
- Died: 28 July 2021 (aged 81); Santiago, Dominican Republic
- Occupations: Singer; bandleader; composer; lawyer; politician
- Years active: 1956–2021
- Musical career
- Genres: Merengue; salsa
- Instruments: Vocals; güira

Mayor of Santo Domingo
- In office 1998–2002
- Succeeded by: Roberto Salcedo Sr.

Juan de Dios Ventura Soriano (8 March 1940 – 28 July 2021), better known as Johnny Ventura nicknamed El Caballo Mayor, was a Dominican singer and band leader of merengue and salsa.

In 2004, he received the Latin Grammy Award for Best Merengue/Bachata Album for his album Sin Desperdicio; also, he was nominated for Best Merengue Album (2006), Best Contemporary Tropical Album (2010) and Best Salsa Album (2016) categories. In 2006, he received the Latin Grammy Lifetime Achievement Award, and in 2022, he entered the Latin Songwriters Hall of Fame.

== Life and career ==
Ventura was born in 1940 to Martín Ventura Ramirez and Virginia Soriano. He had a older sister named Paulina Engracia "Grá" (1924-2020) and a younger brother named Federico Sebastián who died at just 2 years old. He also had 2 older half siblings through his father.

Ventura did not originally intend to pursue a career in music; his childhood ambition was to become an architect. Following his parents' divorce, financial hardships forced him to alter his plans and enroll in a commercial secretarial program at the Instituto Chevalier in Santo Domingo to secure quick employment.

During his childhood, Ventura's father, Martín Ventura, won the lottery, which allowed him to purchase a family home in La Vega. The family later relocated to Montecristi due to Martín's military deployment, a period followed by his parents' divorce, after which his mother returned to the house in La Vega. His father served as the inspiration for the track "Se murió Martín" (also known as "La Muerte de Martín").

He began his career as a singer when he presented himself with some friends in a program of devotees which was broadcast by La Voz de la Alegría weekly. The young Ventura, only 16 years of age, obtained first place of the participants. A little later, he started appearing in the programs of devotees which were sponsored by La Voz Dominicana. When Ventura Soriano appeared for the first time in the TV show: La TV busca una estrella, that was broadcast Friday night at seven, they rang the bell. In the following week, like a champion, Juan de Dios returned to be welcomed in the same competition. He practiced, worked and was crowned for the hit. Then he won first prize. Thereupon he won a lot of prizes in the devotees programs, until he was finally rewarded with the much desired scholarship which the broadcasting company, property of José Arismendy Trujillo Molina, gave for young talents. With La Voz Dominicana, Juan de Dios studied music, vocal techniques and expression. This made Ventura one of the most famous singers in Latin America.

=== Musical career ===
In 1959, Juan de Dios decided to take the name 'Johnny Ventura' given that his name was identical to Juan de Dios Ventura Simó, a pilot who took part in the anti-Trujillo landing of June 1959. He started his career as a singer in several bands that presented themselves at the dances in La Feria. He worked with the orchestra of Rondón Votau and in 1961 with the band of the Dominican percussionist Donald Wild.

In 1962, he sang with Combo Caribe of Luis Pérez, with whom he recorded Cuidado Con el Cuabero, of which he was the author, and La Agarradera, of Luis Pérez. It was with this band that he recorded his first LP consisting of 12 songs.

In 1963, Johnny Ventura was recruited by the musical director Papa Molina to join La Super Orquesta San José, of which he was the director at that time. He joined as singer and as player of the güira. For two years Ventura was part of La Super Orquesta with stars such as Vinicio Franco and Grecia Aquino. Although no records remain of this group, this period was a landmark in his career.

In 1964, the Cuban impresario Ángel Guinea insisted that Johnny Ventura create his own orchestra, El Combo Show, which became a pivotal entity in the history of popular Dominican music. Ventura broke away from the traditional big-band format popularized by older Dominican orchestras, stripping the lineup down to a compact 10-to-12-piece ensemble.

In 1965, with his orchestra, Ventura recorded for the Fonogram label the albums La Coquetona, La Resbalosa and El Turun Tun Tun. In 1967 he travelled to the United States, where he immediately became a star. He is credited with the song "La muerte de Martin", with the voice of Luisito Martí, the Combo Show made their first golden record with Ah..! Yo No Se... No (1971).

=== 1970s ===
He released a series of successful albums and songs that helped modernize merengue by incorporating faster rhythms, choreographed performances, and influences from salsa and other Caribbean genres. Songs such as Salsa Pa' Tu Lechon, El Tabaco, El Guataco, Llegaron Los Caballos and much more strengthened his popularity throughout the Caribbean and among Latino communities in the United States. On March 1st, 1974, Johnny Ventura y Su Combo performed at The New York Latin Music Festival at Madison Square Garden in New York City. This concert featured Johnny Pacheco, Celia Cruz, Fausto Rey, Típica 73, Roberto Roena y su Apollo Sound, and Machito and Graciela. Ventura's mother also wrote several songs for her son's band in the early 1970s, including tracks such as "Fiesta Navideña", "Que Te Parece Cholito", and "El Guataco". The original El Combo Show members, including Anthony Ríos, parted ways in the late 1970s and Ventura formed a new band with new members like Roberto del Castillo.

=== 1980s ===
Ventura remained highly successful, sustaining his popularity as one of the leading figures in merengue music. He continued to draw large audiences across the Caribbean, Latin America, and the United States, where his concerts consistently attracted strong attendance and enthusiastic reception, releasing signature songs like Patacon Pisao. He performed two times at the 1984 Viña del Mar International Song Festival and in 1985, he released another Christmas-themed album, Navidad Sin Ti. In addition to his musical career, Ventura became increasingly involved in public service and politics during the late 1980s.

=== Later life ===
In 1993, he released another hit song, ¿Pitaste? In 1999, Ventura was inducted into the International Latin Music Hall of Fame and won the Lifetime Achievement Award from the same organization in 2003.

In 2006, Ventura was presented with the Latin Grammy Lifetime Achievement Award by the Latin Recording Academy in recognition of his career.

He has been compared to American singer Elvis Presley, nicknamed the 'Elvis of Merengue' due to the extravagant outfits he wore during concerts and the upbeat tempo of his music.

== Political career and activism ==
During the 1960s, Ventura co-founded "El Club de los Monos" (The Monkeys' Club), an organization formed alongside other prominent Black Dominican cultural figures like Rafael Corporán de los Santos, Fausto Rey and Rico Carty. The club intentionally co-opted a common racial slur used against Afro-descendants in order to subvert its meaning, working actively to combat notions of racial prejudice and to celebrate the intellectual and artistic contributions of Black citizens to Dominican society.

In 1978, Ventura faced severe life threats due to his outspoken political activism and protest music opposing the regime of President Joaquín Balaguer. Ventura, an active member of the opposition Dominican Revolutionary Party (PRD) and a close associate of José Francisco Peña Gómez, had recently recorded songs like "Mamá Tingó"—dedicated to the assassinated land rights activist—which greatly angered state authorities. One evening at a restaurant on Calle Barahona in Santo Domingo, an undercover secret police sergeant who was a fan of the artist approached Ventura in tears and confessed to having an official execution order, stating, "I have orders to assassinate you and I do not want to find you." Following an urgent consultation with Peña Gómez, who advised him to leave immediately, Ventura fled into exile to Puerto Rico, remaining there until Balaguer was defeated in the 1978 elections by Antonio Guzmán Fernández.

He was elected as a Deputy to the National Congress, serving from 1982 to 1986. He later moved into municipal government, serving as Vice Mayor of the capital city, Santo Domingo, from 1994 to 1998, before ultimately serving as Mayor of Santo Domingo from 1998 to 2002.

== Personal life and legacy ==
Later in life, Ventura returned to academia and earned a law degree from the Universidad de la Tercera Edad, graduating summa cum laude. In 1998, he published his official autobiography, titled Un poco de mí (A Little of Me), through the Colección de Cultura Dominicana.

On June 29, 1972, Ventura officially married Nelly Josephina "Fifa" Flores. The couple first met in 1968 at a Banco Popular event where Ventura's orchestra was performing; upon noticing her, Ventura spontaneously called out the name "Fifa" over the microphone, which became her lifelong nickname. Her father initially rejected the relationship, strongly disapproving of his daughter marrying a musician and predicting the union would last no more than six months.

On March 28, 2020, Ventura announced that he had tested positive for COVID-19 during the COVID-19 pandemic and was hospitalized. On April 13, 2020, he announced he had recovered and had tested negative for the coronavirus.

Ventura died from a heart attack on July 28, 2021, at the age of 81, after being rushed to a hospital in Santiago de los Caballeros. He left behind seven children, including three from his marriage to Nelly Josefina Flores and four from previous relationships.

Ventura's son, Jandy, also a musician who has branded himself as "El Legado" (The Legacy), released Yo Soy El Merengue with his father eight months after his death. It's unclear whether they recorded the song before Johnny's death or whether Jandy used an old, unreleased recording of Johnny. Jandy also collaborated with Milly Quezada and Carlos Vives to release Buscando Al Caballo (Homenaje a Johnny Ventura) on May of 2022.

=== Posthumous honors ===
Following his death, Dominican President Luis Abinader declared three days of official national mourning across the country. Due to his historical status as both a significant cultural icon and a former public official, Ventura was laid in state at the Congress Palace and the major municipal hall before receiving full military honors at his burial. In 2022, Ventura was posthumously inducted into the Latin Songwriters Hall of Fame.

== Discography ==
=== Albums (including with El Combo Show) ===
- La Agarradera Vol. 4 (1962)
- Cuidado con el Cuabero (1963)
- El Llorón (El Florón) (1964)
- 1920 y Otros Éxitos (1964)
- El Turun Tun Tun (1965)
- El Boogaloo Está en Algo (1965)
- La Resbalosa (1965)
- Siempre Pa' Lante (1966)
- Figurando (1966)
- El Papelito Blanco (1967)
- Noches en Quisqueya (1968)
- El Mamito (1968)
- Siempre en Órbita (1969)
- El Guataco (1970)
- Más Éxitos (1970)
- Ah..! Yo No Se... No (1971)
- Salsa y Algo Más... (1971)
- ¿Tú Sabes a Qué Yo Vine? Te Digo Ahorita (1972)
- Bambaraquiti (with Joseito Mateo) (1972)
- Traigo Mi Salsa... Pa' Tu Lechón (1972)
- Navidades En Merengues y Salves (with Rafael Colón) (1972)
- El Pingüino (1973)
- Acompaña a Sus Creaciones (1973)
- ...De Nuevo Presente (1973)
- Salsa! (1973)
- La Protesta de los Feos (1974)
- Un Poquito Para Atrás: Mamá Tingó (1974)
- El Hijo del Pueblo (1975)
- En Acción (1975)
- 12 Aniversario (1976)
- ¡El Que Venga Atrás Que Arree! (1976)
- Solo Para Bailadores (1976)
- Excitante (1977)
- El Disco Rayao (1977)
- 2 Ases al Tiro (with Rolando Laserie) (1977)
- Navidades Dominicanas (with Luis Alberti) (1977)
- Amar Es Vivir (with Rafael Colón) (1978)
- Presentando a Mi Nueva Cosecha (1978)
- En Su 15 Aniversario (1979)
- Yo Soy el Merengue (1980)
- Johnny Mucho... Mucho Johnny! (1981)
- Lo Que Te Gusta (1981)
- El Sueño (1982)
- Flying High (Volando Alto) (1983)
- Concierto de Amor (with Rafael Colón) (1983)
- Y Buena Que Está... María (1984)
- El Hombre y Su Música (1985)
- Navidad Sin Ti (1985)
- Capullo y Sorullo (1986)
- El Señor del Merengue (1986)
- Si Vuelvo a Nacer (1987)
- El Caballo... Una Leyenda (1988)
- Ayer y Hoy (1989)
- Quisqueya y Borinquen (1990)
- Éxtasis (1990)
- 35 Aniversario Con Sus Invitados (1992)
- Siempre (1993)
- Retoñando (1994)
- El Gran Encuentro del Combo Show (1995)
- Como el Café (1996)
- Sin Desperdicio (2003)
- 103 Boulevard (2006)
- Volvió la Navidad (2009)
- El Viejo Ta' en la Calle (2013)
- Tronco Viejo (2016)

=== Compilations ===
- 12 Grandes Éxitos (1960)
- Vamos a Bailar Merembé (1968)
- Super Hits (1973)
- En Alas de Quisqueyana (1976)
- Super Hits Vol. 3 (1977)
- Salsa y Más Salsa (1977)
- Por el Campeonato Mundial! (with Wilfrido Vargas) (1977)
- Sonido Negro (1979)
- 14 Éxitos de Johnny Ventura (1981)
- Las Tapas (1981)
- Un Saludo al Diputado: 14 Éxitos Vol. 2 (1982)
- Classic: Con Su Sabor Original (1985)
- 16 Éxitos (1987)
- 20 Éxitos en Salsa (1991)
- Los Reyes del Merengue (with Wilfrido Vargas) (1991)
- 12 Golden Hits (1993)
- Grandes Éxitos (1993)
- The Best (1994)
- Brillantes (with Sergio Vargas) (1994)
- El Rey y la Reina del Merengue (with Milly Quezada) (1996)
- Cara a Cara (with Sergio Vargas) (1997)
- El Disco de Oro (1997)
- 40 Aniversario: En Vivo (1998)
- Palo Bonito (1999)
- 20th Anniversary (1999)
- Merenguero Hasta la Tambora (2000)
- Oro Merenguero (2000)
- El Oro del Caballo Negro (2001)
- 22 Ultimate Hits Series (2002)
- Serie Azul Tropical (2003)
- Soy (2004)
- 10 de Colección (2005)
- ¡Oye Que Rico Mami... Salsa! (2006)
- 20 Éxitos Originales (2006)
- El Rey del Merengue (2007)
- Mis Favoritas (2011)

=== Soundtracks ===
- 1975: Order to Assassinate – "El Tabaco"
- 1984: Blood Simple – "El Sueño"
- 1987: The Believers – "Patacon Pisao"
- 1990: Miami Blues – "Bobine"
- 2023: The Horror of Dolores Roach: "Like a Stoned-Ass Baby" – "Tiene Sabor"
- 2025: Milly: Queen of Merengue – "El Tabaco"

== See also ==
- List of Afro-Latinos

Government offices
Preceded by Fello Suberví	Mayor of Santo Domingo, Distrito Nacional; 1998–2002	Succeeded by Roberto Salcedo
