= Héctor Acosta (singer) =

Dominican singer

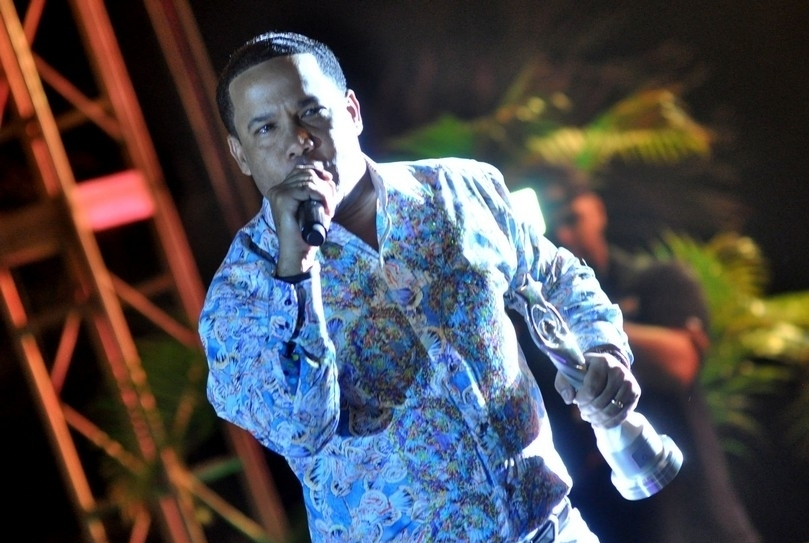

Background information
- Born: Héctor Elpidio Acosta Restituyo; May 23, 1967 (age 59); Bonao, Monseñor Nouel Province, Dominican Republic
- Genres: Bachata; merengue
- Occupation: Singer
- Instrument: Vocals
- Years active: 1980s-present
- Labels: Hector Acosta & Orquesta S. A.; D.A.M Pruduction Inc.; Venemusic; Machete Music; Universal Music Latino
- Formerly of: Los Toros Band

Héctor Elpidio Acosta Restituyo (born May 23, 1967), better known as Héctor Acosta "El Torito" (Héctor Acosta "The Little Bull") or simply Héctor Acosta, is a Dominican singer and politician. In 2020, he was elected senator representing the Monseñor Nouel Province before the Senate of the Dominican Republic; he was reelected in 2024.

Acosta was the lead singer for the Dominican band Los Toros Band (The Bull Band). They were mostly a merengue band who in the late 1990s started to perform bachata songs which would gain huge success. In the mid-2000s he continued as a solo artist and would gain bigger success with hits like "Me Voy", "Con Que Ojos", "Tu Primera Vez", "Me Duele La Cabeza", "Levántate", "Amorcito Enfermito", among others. Some of his hits have reached number one on the Billboard Tropical Songs chart. He has released seven studio albums in which three of them have been certified gold in the United States by the Recording Industry Association of America (RIAA). Acosta is considered one of Dominican music's greatest musicians.

== Early life ==
Acosta was born on Bonao, Monseñor Nouel, Dominican Republic on May 23, 1967. He is the son of Elpidio Acosta, a school teacher and Seferina Irene Restituyo. He is the oldest of two brothers. At an early age, he was involve in music as he was part of a church choir in his hometown. This would help him in his singing, even though he originally was trying to pursue a career in baseball.

In 1982, he participated in a voice festival contest by a local radio station named Novel Radio. He won first prize in the contest. This would eventually lead him to a career in music.

== Career ==
=== Early career (1982–1989) ===
Acosta formed La Renovación Quisqueyana (The Quisqueyan Renovation/Renewal) along with members from the church choir he was a part of. This group had characteristics similar to another merengue group Los Paymasi. Two years later, Acosta left the group to join another group called Los Gentiles (The Gentle Ones), who were considered the most refined group in the city of Bonao at the time. In the late 1980s, Acosta worked for Dominican merengue band Los Hermanos Rosario (The Rosario Brothers). He worked as a back-up vocalist and covered for one of its members, Toño Rosario, who at the time took a leave of absence due to legal issues. Also, Acosta's voice at the time resembled Toño's voice. He would eventually meet the band's manager Gerardo Díaz, known as El Toro (The Bull), who would eventually also become his manager as he would convince Acosta to be part of the band that would be known as Los Toros Band. Acosta left The Rosario Brothers to be the lead singer of Díaz's band.

=== Los Toros Band (1990–2006) ===
In 1990, Los Toros Band (The Bull Band) was formed and released their debut album Se Soltaron Los Toros (The Bulls Have Released Themselves). The album gained huge success on radio. On May 4, 1991, Acosta would officially start doing presentations as the lead vocalist and leader of the band and would start making appearances at concerts, parties, and on TV shows. Since then, they gained success with multiple merengue hits. Later on they would release bachata songs that would eventually establish the group to be seen as a bachata band as well, thus giving them international fame in the process. In 2006, he would depart from the band to pursue a solo career. Prior to his departure there were issues between him and the record label Los Toros Records (The Bull Records), which was owned by Gerardo Díaz and his brother Juan Pablo Díaz. From late 2005 to early 2006, Acosta was in a legal battle to get out of his contract. Also, the group was not allowed to perform live or the record label would sue them. Eventually, an agreement was made and Acosta was no longer a member of Los Toros Band.

=== Starting a solo career, more international exposure, and becoming a bachata star (2006–2009) ===
In late 2006, he embarked in a solo career and signed with D.A.M. Productions. On October 24, 2006, he released his debut solo album Sigo Siendo Yo (I Continue Being Me). It peaked at number 19 on the Billboard Tropical Albums chart. A special edition was released on March 25, 2009, which featured music videos and a photo gallery. The special edition was distributed by Venemusic and Universal Music Latin Entertainment. These labels would eventually distribute his albums. This was a predominantly merengue album and featured the merengue single "¿Cómo Me Curo?" ("How Do I Cure Myself?"). Even though this is mostly a merengue album, it featured two bachata singles that became the most successful songs from the album. The singles were "Primavera Azul" ("Blue Spring") and "Me Voy" ("I'm Leaving"), which was written by Romeo Santos and it is a bachata cover of a merengue song by Aventura. Later on, Romeo, who was the group's lead singer, was featured in a remix of the cover, which was added to another album. They would perform the song together at Aventura's concert at Madison Square Garden. The live performance was featured on the group's third live album Kings of Bachata: Sold Out at Madison Square Garden.

With the success Acosta was gaining in bachata, he started to make albums with more bachata songs. His next albums would either be hybrids of bachata and merengue, or predominantly bachata. He released his second solo album Mitad / Mitad (Half / Half) on April 15, 2008, and it was distributed by Venevision International Music and Machete Music. It features a cover of Jorge Celedón's song "Sin Perdón" which became a number one hit on the Billboard Tropical Songs chart. It also features the single "Con Que Ojos" ("With What Eyes"). On the Billboard charts, the album peaked at number 62 on the Top Latin Albums chart, and at number 5 on the Tropical Albums chart. It was certified gold in the U.S. by the Recording Industry Association of America (RIAA) for shipping 30,000 copies in the US. This is the album that includes the remix of "Me Voy" with Romeo Santos. The remix peaked at number 48 on the Billboard Hot Latin Songs chart and at number 15 on the Billboard Tropical Songs chart. The album also featured a song of reggaeton and bachata with Latin rap group El Pueblo. In the same year, he released his first concert film En Vivo (Live). In the same year, Acosta and Celedón performed a duet titled "Me Vió Llorar" ("Saw Me Weep") which is bachata and vallenato mixed song. It reached number one on the Billboard Tropical Songs. He then was featured in the song "Vicio Del Pecado" ("Vice Of Sin") by Puerto Rican duo R.K.M & Ken-Y as part of the duo's second studio album The Royalty: La Realeza.

On May 26, 2009, he released his third album Simplemente... El Torito (Simply... The Little Bull). It featured collaborations with Marcy Place, Bachata Heightz, Don Omar, and R.K.M & Ken-Y. It gain more success then the previous album as it was certified gold by the Recording Industry Association of America (RIAA) for selling 50,000 copies in the United States. On the Billboard charts, it peaked at number 21 on the Heatseekers Albums chart, at number 20 on the Top Latin Albums chart, and at number 2 on the Tropical Albums chart. The album included the singles "Me Vio Llorar" ("She Saw Me Cry") bachata only version, "No Me Lloren" ("Don't Cry For Me"), "Me Puedo Matar" ("I Could Die") with Bachata Heightz, and "Tu Primera Vez" ("Your First Time"), along with a remix featuring reggaeton duo R.K.M & Ken-Y.

=== Oblígame, Con El Corazón Abierto, and La Historia... Mis Exitos (2010–2014) ===
In 2010 he released his first solo compilation album The Ultimate Bachata Collection. It is a greatest hits album containing his greatest hits as a solo artist and bachata hits from his time in Los Toros Band. In the same year, he released his second concert film Una Noche con El Torito (One Night with El Torito). On October 19, 2010, he released his fourth studio album Oblígame (Obligate Me). It featured a collaboration with Mexican singer Alejandro Fernández in a bachata version of Fernández's song "Se Me Va La Voz" ("I Lose My Voice"). It sold 30,000 copies in the U.S., thus being certified gold by the Recording Industry Association of America (RIAA). On the Billboard charts, it peaked at number 24 on the Heatseekers Albums chart, at number 13 on the Top Latin Albums chart, and at number 2 on the Tropical Albums chart. It received a Latin Grammy nomination for Best Contemporary Tropical Album. It included the single "Me Duele La Cabeza" (My Head Hurts), which on the Billboard charts, it peaked number 47 on the Hot Latin Songs chart, and at number 3 on the Tropical Airplay chart.

In 2011, he released his second compilation album The Ultimate Merengue Collection. The album contained studio and live versions of merengue hit songs from his solo career and from Los Toros Band. On August 21, 2012, he released his fifth studio album Con El Corazón Abierto (With An Open Heart). It featured a collaboration with Mexican-American singer Pepe Aguilar. On the Billboard charts, it peaked at number 33 on the Heatseekers Albums chart, at number 16 on the Top Latin Albums chart, and at number 3 on the Tropical Albums chart. Its lead single "Tu Veneno" ("Your Venom") peaked at number 42 on the Hot Latin Songs chart and at number 1 on the Tropical Airplay chart, thus becoming his third number-one single on the chart. The album also includes the song "Para Llegar A Donde Estoy" ("To Get To Where I At"), which was released as a single in 2014 to promote his third compilation album La Historia... Mis Exitos (The History... My Hits). The album was released on April 3, 2014.

=== Continued success, Merengue Y Sentimiento, and Este Soy Yo (2015–present) ===
October 16, 2015, Acosta release his sixth studio album Merengue Y Sentimiento (Merengue And Feelings). It features a collaboration with Mexican band La Original Banda El Limón de Salvador Lizárraga (Salvador Lizárraga's Original Lemon Band) and Puerto Rican singer Manny Manuel. It includes the singles, "Ojalá" ("Hopefully"), "O Te Vas o Me Voy Yo" ("Either You Leave or I Leave"), "Es Urgente" ("It's Urgent"), "Amorcito Enfermito" ("Sick Sweetheart") which became one of his most successful songs of his career. It peaked at number 2 on the Monitor Latino's Dominican Republic Bachata chart. It also peaked at number 1 on the Billboard Tropical Airplay. The song became a success as a meme due to the line "se murio" (It died).

On November 1, 2018, he was featured in the bachata version of the single "Mala Suerte" ("Bad Luck") by Puerto Rican Urban artist Jory Boy. On October 11, 2019, he released the single "Con Los Ojos Cerrados" ("With The Eyes Closed") with Dominican merengue singer Milly Quezada. On November 29, 2019, he then released the greatest hits album, Los Número Uno (The Number Ones). On May 20, 2022, He released his seventh studio album Este Soy Yo (This is Me). It includes the singles "Antes del Lunes" ("Before Monday"), "Yo Sé" ("I Know"), "Pa' Que Me Perdones" ("So You Can Forgive Me"), and "Pecador" ("Sinner"). These singles were released between 2019 and 2022. On March 7, 2023, he released "Somos Dominicanos" ("We're Dominicans") with Dominican rapper El Piro. On August 10, 2023, he released the song "La Despedida" ("The Farewell") with Ecuadorian pop singer Javier Neira and Mexican singer Alan Ramírez.

== Discography ==
The following is his discography list:

=== Studio albums ===
- Sigo Siendo Yo (2006)
- Mitad / Mitad (2008)
- Simplemente... El Torito (2009)
- Oblígame (2010)
- Con El Corazón Abierto (2012)
- Merengue Y Sentimiento (2015)
- Este Soy Yo (2022)

=== Live albums ===
- Tipico (2004) - J&N Records

=== Compilation albums ===
- The Ultimate Bachata Collection (2010)
- The Ultimate Merengue Collection (2011)
- La Historia... Mis Exitos (2014)
- Los Número Uno (2019)

=== Concert Films ===
- En Vivo (2008)
- Una Noche Con El Torito (2010)
