= Rafael Corporán de los Santos =

TV producer and host, entrepreneur and political figure

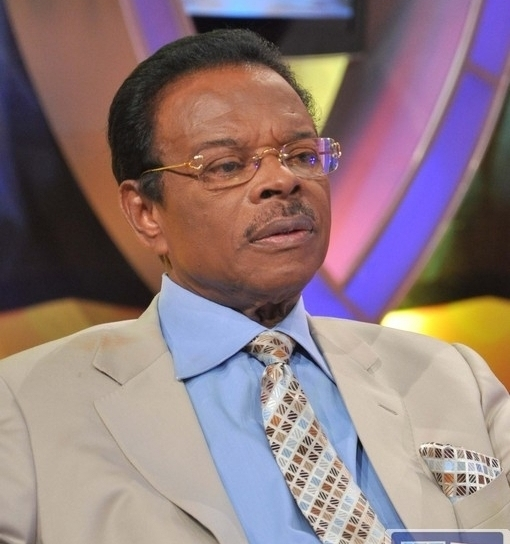
- Born: July 22, 1937; La Mata, Cotuí, Dominican Republic
- Died: March 5, 2012 (aged 74); Santo Domingo, Distrito Nacional, Dominican Republic
- Occupations: TV producer, TV host, entrepreneur, political figure, philanthropist
- Years active: 1963–2012

Rafael Corporán de los Santos (July 22, 1937 – March 5, 2012), better known as Corporán, was a TV producer, TV host, entrepreneur, political figure, and philanthropist from the Dominican Republic.

He died of a heart attack on 5 March 2012.

Government offices
Preceded by Fello Suberví	Mayor of Santo Domingo, Distrito Nacional; 1990–1994	Succeeded by Fello Suberví
