= Grupo Manía =

Puerto Rican merengue group

Grupo Mania
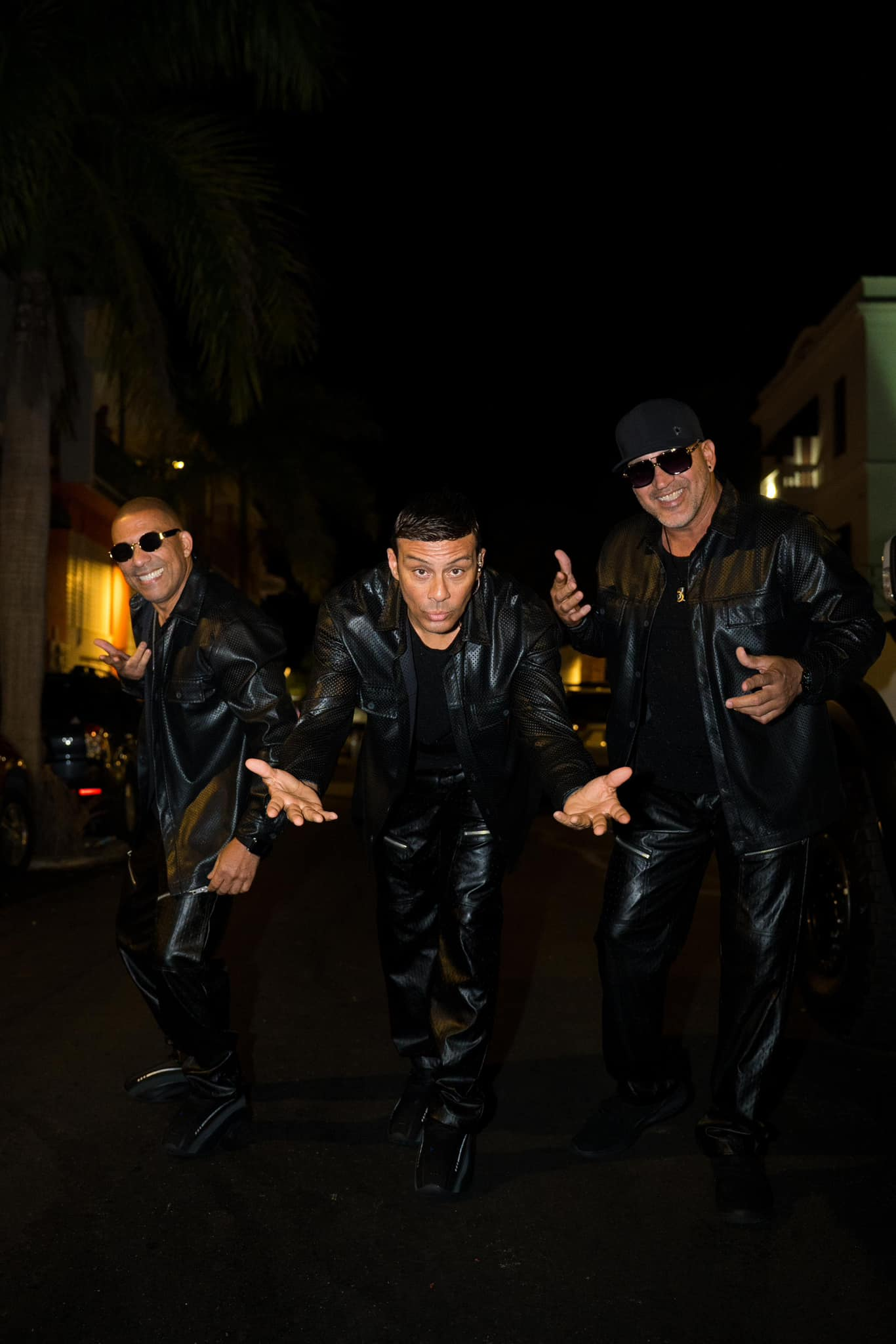
- Grupo Mania in 2025

Background information
- Origin: Puerto Rico
- Genre: Merengue
- Years active: 1993-present
- Members: Héctor Serrano ("Banchy"); Daniel Serrano; Alfred Cotto
- Past members: Edwin Serrano; Elvis Crespo; Reynaldo Santiago; Alex Rivera; Juan Luis Guzmán; Oscar Serrano; Rubiel Barroso; Emanuelle Vizcarrondo; Raúl Armando del Valle; Jhonny Vélez

Grupo Manía (sometimes spelled Grupomanía or GrupoManía) is a popular merengue group from Puerto Rico. It has won various accolades, including the Grammy Award for Best Merengue Album in 2003.

== History ==
Grupo Manía was founded in 1993 when Héctor "Banchy" Serrano joined three other young men, including one of his eight brothers, Oscar Serrano, and Alfred Cotto, to form a quartet and launch their career.

• 1994 – They won their first Gold Record with the production "Explotó el Bombazo", surpassing 50 thousand units sold.

• 1995 to 1998 – They won the Tambora Dorada Award in Puerto Rico for four consecutive years. These awards were chosen by the dance community.

• 1996 – They earned a Double Platinum Record with their production “Está de Moda.”

• 1997 – They won two ASCAP Awards.

• 1997 – They earned a Grammy nomination in the Tropical category with their production “The Dynasty.”

• 2000 – “The Dynasty,” the album for which they earned their first Grammy nomination, in the Tropical category.

Several performances at the Carnival of Tenerife, Canary Islands, Spain.

• 2002 - They win the coveted American Grammy award “Best Latin Merengue Album 2002” with the production “Latino”.

• 2007 - They perform at the prestigious Lo Nuestro Awards, where they are nominated as group of the year in the merengue genre.

• 2009 – With their tenth album, “15 Años de Corazón” and its promotional cut “Marialola” were placed at the top of the radio charts in the United States, Puerto Rico and the international market, receiving four (4) nominations for Premios Lo Nuestro in the Tropical category. They won nominations for Album of the Year, Group or Duo of the Year, Tropical Merengue, Artist of the Year and Song of the Year for their super hit Maria Lola.

• During the month of February 2013, they released their new album, titled "Poderosos," in countries such as Chile, Argentina, Uruguay, Paraguay, Panama, Venezuela, Costa Rica, Honduras, the Dominican Republic, and the European Peninsula.

• In 2013, they continued their rise locally and internationally with the celebration of their 20th anniversary with a worldwide concert tour titled Grupo Manía Mundial. They have traveled to different states in the United States, Panama, Argentina, Chile, Ecuador, Honduras, and other countries.

• In 2015, with the departure of his brother Oscar Serrano from the group, another of his brothers, Daniel Serrano, joined. Songs such as Otro Loco, Tocaito, La Nena, and Amigo, immediately gained international acclaim. Grupo Manía thus began a new era, returning to its musical roots. Tocaito has become the most popular since its release.

In 2019, Grupo Mania was the only group of its kind to release a full-length album, Los Conquistadores, during the pandemic and was nominated for a Latin Grammy in 2020.

In 2025, Grupo Mania celebrates 32 years of successful career. The group currently consists of three singers: Hector "Banchy" Serrano, Alfred Cotto, and Daniel Serrano.

Guided by experienced producer Alexis Vázquez.

=== Former Members ===
- Elvis Crespo (1993 - 1997)
  - Óscar Serrano (1993 - 2015)
  - Reynaldo "Chino" Santiago (1998 - 2002)
  - Rubiel Barroso (2016 - 2021)
  - Jhonny Vélez (2016 - 2018)
  - Emanuelle Vizcarrondo (2018-2024)
  - Raúl Armando del Valle (2021-2024)
  - Álex Rivera (2003 - 2005)
  - Juan Luis Guzmán (2003 - 2005)
  - Edwin Serrano (1993 - 1994)

== Discography ==
- (1993) ¡A Bombazo...Sí!
- (1994) Explotó el Bombazo
- (1995) Dance Manía
- (1996) Está de Moda
- (1997) Alto Honor
- (1998) The Dynasty
- (1999) Masters of the Stage
- (2001) 2050
- (2002) Latino
- (2003) Hombres de Honor
- (2005) La Hora de la Verdad
- (2008) 15 Años de Corazón
- (2009) Se Pegó la Manía
- (2013) Poderoso
- (2016) La Marca
- (2019) Los Conquistadores: 25 Aniversario
- (2025) Mundialmente Manía
