= Toño Rosario =

Dominican singer (born 1955)

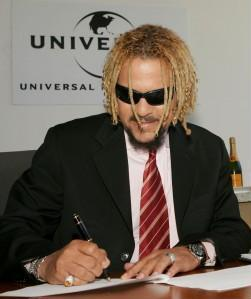
- Rosario signing a deal with Universal Music (2004)

Background information
- Born: Máximo Antonio del Rosario Almonte; November 3, 1955 (age 70); Higüey, Dominican Republic
- Genre: Merengue
- Occupations: Musician; singer; composer; arranger
- Years active: 1978–present
- Labels: Universal Music Latino; RCA; Sony
- Formerly of: Los Hermanos Rosario

Máximo Antonio del Rosario (born November 3, 1955), professionally known as Toño Rosario, is a Dominican Grammy Award-nominated musician, best known for his role of bandleader of Merengue music act Los Hermanos Rosario. In 1990, he started his successful solo career receiving gold and platinum certifications.

Toño Rosario is a best-selling Merengue artist who has received nominations to the Latin Grammy Awards, Latin Billboard Music Awards and Grammy Awards. Rosario is known for hits such as ‘Kulikitaca’, ‘Resistire’, ‘Seguire’, ‘Jenny’ and ‘Viborar del Mar’. Rosario was the first solo merengue artist to ever sell out Madison Square Garden, United Palace, Altos de Chavón, la Plaza del Toro, Madrid, and Cuervana Stadium, México. Rosario is a minority owner/limited partner of the Miami Dolphins NFL team.

== Musical career ==
Maximo Antonio del Rosario is best known for his Merengue numbers. As a member of Los Hermanos Rosario, Rosario has been a key figure in popularizing Merengue music, with hits reaching the top of the Billboard Latin charts and the top of charts in Europe. Rosario is the top selling Merengue artist of all time. The three-time Grammy nominee has sold more than 100 million albums worldwide. He is best known for his Romantic Merengue renditions.

Toño Rosario and his brothers were always interested in music. From young, they recall finding whatever instruments they could in household items since they were born in poverty and could not afford real musical instruments. The group in which Toño started his musical career was formed in 1978 and its name is "Los Hermanos Rosario": it consisted of himself, his brothers Pepe and Rafa (as the lead singers) and brothers Luis, Tony, and Francis (as the instrument players). They used to play in their neighbors houses and this is how they eventually got to be known and discovered. After the death of their brother Pepe, Toño and Rafa took the lead in the band with Toño as the main singer due to his unique and highly recognized voice.

In the late 1980s, after 12 years of being with his brothers, Toño was removed from the group and began his own solo career. He debuted on April 14, 1990, in the "Roberto Clemente" Coliseum of Puerto Rico. He went on to become the most popular Merengue singer with some of his albums reaching diamond status. His Debut Album, "Y mas...", receive critical acclaim. With his second album, "Atado a ti" sold more than the expectations of the label and stayed at the Billboard Charts for more than 30 weeks. In 1992, his third studio album "Retorno a mis raises", went Platinum. The Single "La Gozadera" peaked at the number 7 in Dominican airplay.

In 1993, his fourth studio album "Amor Jollao" went Gold. In 1994, he signed with WEA Latina, followed by the release of the albums "Me olvide de vivir" (1994) and Quiero Volver a Empezar (1995). The subsequents, "Seguire" (1997) and "Exclusivo" (1998) become his highest charted albums in the United States.

La Magia del Cuco, released in 1999, become his first album to be certified platinum by the RIAA, with sales over 200,000 copies. In that same year, Toño performed at The Merengue Festival in Santo Domingo, Dominican Republic.

In 2000, Toño 10th Studio Album "Yo soy Toño" become his best selling album to date. It was certified platinum (Latin Field) by the RIAA and sold over 250,000 copies. Also, it was nominated for Best Merengue Album at the 44th Annual Grammy Awards and Best Merengue/Bachata Album at the 2nd Annual Latin Grammy Awards.

Toño en America, dropped in 2002, was moderated success and debut at in Dominican Republic Best Selling Albums Charts. The single "Yo kuli, Yo kula" better known as "Kulikitaca" become a massive success across Latin America

In 2004, Toño Rosario signed a multi-album contract with Universal Latino. Also, performed a sold-out show at Altos the Chavon with Tego Calderon. In the same year, On December 7, he released 12th studio album "Resistire", met positive reviews and it was nominated for Best Merengue/Bachata Album at the 6th Annual Latin Grammy Awards. The title track was nominated as "Tropical Airplay Song of the Year" at the 2006 Latin Billboard Music Awards.

In 2006, his live album "En Vivo: El original" peaked at 5 on US Tropical Albums Chart.

"A tu gusto" was released in 2007 and enter at the top 10 of Billboard Tropical Charts. In 2009, his compilation album Don't Worry Be Happy: The Best of Toño Rosario debut at 16 on Billboard Tropical Albums.

In 2018, his song "Kulikitaka" became an internet sensation in the southern Indian Member State of Kerala. It became very famous and was used in numerous stage shows and video albums. In Kerala, it became famous as an African song and not as a Latin song because of a video that circulated in WhatsApp. Even small restaurants started getting named after the song in Kerala.

Tono Rosario married Marilyn Brenes in 1983, at Marriage Palace, in New York City.

== Discography ==
=== With Los Hermanos Rosario ===
==== Studio albums ====
- 1980: ¡Vienen Acabando!
- 1983: Vol. 1
- 1984: Vol. 2
- 1985: Vol. 3
- 1987: Acabando!
- 1988: Otra Vez!
- 1990: Fuera de Serie

==== Compilation albums ====
- 1988: Lo Mejor de los Hermanos Rosario
- 1989: Lo Mejor de los Hermanos Rosario Vol. 2
- 1993: 14 Éxitos Impressionantes
- 1994: Juntos Con Sus Éxitos
- 1997: El Disco de Oro
- 1998: La Historia Musical Rosario
- 2001: 20 Aniversario
- 2003: Grandes Éxitos
- 2005: Grandes Éxitos Vol. 2
- 2006: Antología Musical
- 2007: La Bomba

=== Solo discography ===
==== Studio albums ====
Title	Year	Charts		Sales	Certifications
Title	Year	US Latin	US Tropical	Sales	Certifications
Y mas...	1990	—	16		
Atado a Ti	1991	—	8	World: 100,000	
Retorno a las raíces	1992	—	12		
Amor Jollao	1993	—	11		
Me olvidé de vivir	1994	—	15		
Quiero volver a empezar	1995	—	13 (Note: Also, hit 7 on Cash Box Top 40 Latin Albums.)		
Seguiré	1997	30	6		
Exclusivo	1998	11	5		
La Magia del Cuco	1999	—	—	US: 100,000	RIAA: Platinum (Latin)
Yo soy Toño	2000	—	13	US: 100,000; DOM: 62,000; World: 250,000	RIAA: Platinum (Latin)
Toño en America	2002	—	12		
Resistire	2004	—	11		
A Tu Gusto	2007	—	9		
Albums that did not chart are denoted with an "—".

==== Compilation albums ====
- Grandes Éxitos: Cinco Años de Platino (1995)
- Colecciones y Éxitos (1997)
- La Alegría del Merengue (1999)
- Serie 2000 (2000)
- Juntos (con Wilfrido Vargas) (2002)
- Colección Diamante (2003)
- Todo lo Bueno de Toño Rosario (2003)
- Amigo Mío: Toño y Sus Éxitos (2003)
- Lo Mejor de Toño Rosario (2006)
- Tradicional (2006)
- Don't Worry Be Happy: The Best of Toño Rosario (2009)
- 20 Grandes Éxitos (2010)
- Mis Favoritas (2012)

==== Live albums ====
- En Vivo: El Original (2006)
- Lo Más Encendío de Toño Rosario (2007)
- Los Mega Éxitos en Vivo (2009)
- El Mandatario (2011)

==== Singles ====
Year	Single	Peak chart positions				Album
Year	Single	US	US Latin	US Tropical	MEX	Album
1990	"Jenny"	97	1	1	–	Toño Rosario, Y mas
1990	"Vibora del Mar"	83	1	1	14	Toño Rosario, Y mas
1991	"Vibora del Mar" (re-issue)	–	1	1	–	Toño Rosario, Y mas
1991	"Otra Vez"	–	–	–	–	Toño Rosario, Y mas
1991	"Tu Mujer"	–	42	–	9	Toño Rosario, Y mas
1995	"Me Olvide de Vivir"			(Note: It did not enter on Billboard charts. However, it charted 11th on CashBox Tropical Airplay.)		Me Olvide de Vivir
1995	"Quiero Volver A Empezar"			13		Quiero Volver a Empezar
1995	"Estupida"			4		Quiero Volver a Empezar
1996	"Sera"			17		Quiero Volver a Empezar
1997	"Seguire"		24	7		Seguire
1997	"Loco Loco"		24	7		Seguire
1998	"Asi Fue"		22	8		Exclusivo
1999	"Alegria"		33	15		La Alegria Del Merengue
2000	"Juan en la ciudad"			20		La Magia del Cuco
2000	"Tu va vei"			14		La Magia del Cuco
2000	"El Ritmo de la Navidad"			20		Yo Soy Toño
2001	"Yo Me Muero Por Ella"			18		Yo Soy Toño
2002	"Yo Kuli Yo Kula"			15		Toño En America
2004	"Amigo mio" (featuring Tego Calderon)		44	2		Amigo Mío: Toño y Sus Éxitos
2005	"Resistire"		44	4		Resistire
2005	"En Navidad"			18		Resistire
2006	"A lo Oscuro"			13		En Vivo: El Original
2007	"Ojala se Seque El Rio"			35		En Vivo: El Original
2007	"Cortame las venas"	–	44	–	–	A tu Gusto
2017	"Dale Vieja Dale"			10		

== In popular culture ==
Rosario's version of Kulikitaka became viral on TikTok in 2021–2022, becoming its own "challenge", resulting in legal issues for some participants.

== Personal life ==
Rosario was once married to Puerto Rican merengue singer Ivette Cintron.
