= Limi-T 21 =

Puerto Rican merengue group

Limi-T 21 (sometimes spelled as Limi-T XXI) is a popular merengue group from Puerto Rico. The group was formed in 1990.

The group consists of three members: Elvin Torres, Javier Bermúdez, and Angel Ramior Matos. They released their first album in 1990, breaking new ground in the genre of merengue. Their success has taken them all around Latin America (1994). In 1996, they presented in the Centro de Bellas Artes in Puerto Rico, becoming the first merengue group to do so. Throughout their career, they have achieved several awards, and some of their albums have reached platinum.

They celebrated their 15th anniversary with a huge concert that was released in CD and DVD. It was titled Real Time.

== Members ==
- Elvin Torres Serrant was born on January 25, 1971, in Santa Isabel, Puerto Rico. He is the musical director of the band, plus an arranger, singer, and composer.
- Ángel Ramiro Matos was born on March 21, 1969, in Coamo, Puerto Rico. He is also one of the composers of the band.
- Javier Bermúdez was born on September 18, 1969, in Santa Isabel, Puerto Rico. He is the choreographer of the group.

== Discography ==
- Limi-T 21 (1991)
- No Hay Límite (1992)
- Motivos Para Amar (1994)
- Esencia (1995)
- Comenzaré Otra Historia (1996)
- De lo Que Soy Capaz (1997)
- Séptima Armonía (1999)
- Sabe a Limi-T (2000)
- Calle Sabor, Esquina Amor (2001)
- El Grupo del Pueblo (2002)
- Como Nunca... Como Siempre (2004)
- Rankeao (2005)
- Real Time (2006)
- Adictivo (2009)
- Party and Dance (2013)
