= Los Hermanos Rosario =

Merengue music band

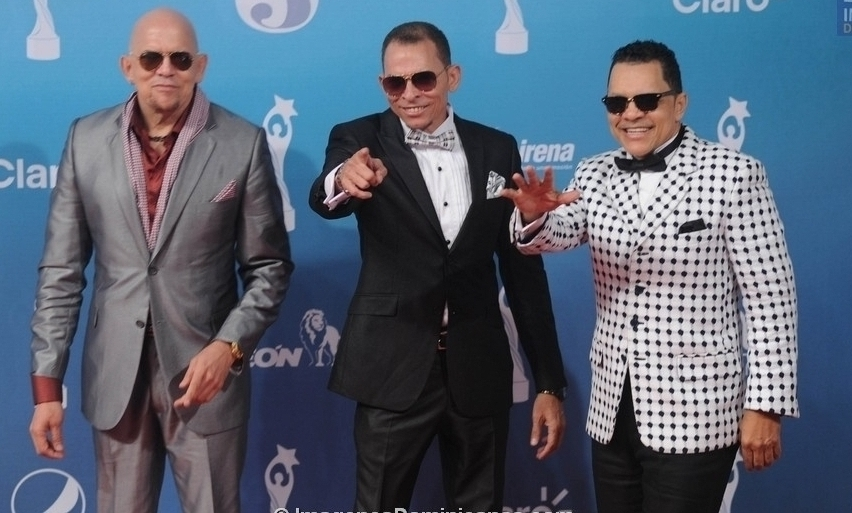

Background information
- Origin: Higuey, Dominican Republic
- Genre: Merengue
- Years active: 1978–1983, 1987–present
- Labels: Sony BMG, Kubaney, RCA International, Karen
- Members: Rafa Rosario; Luis Rosario; Tony Rosario
- Past members: Pepe Rosario; Toño Rosario

Los Hermanos Rosario (The Rosario Brothers in English) is a merengue band, originally consisting of brothers Toño Rosario, Pepe, Rafa, Tony and Luis.

== History ==
Los Hermanos Rosario is an emblematic merengue music band from the Dominican Republic. The orchestra was founded on 1 May 1978, Labor Day in Salvaleón de Higuey, a town on the edge of the eastern part of the Dominican Republic. At that time, the 7 brothers debuted with the municipal authorities in a ceremony in their native town.

Shortly thereafter, Los Hermanos Rosario began a quest in search of artistic success. They developed their activities initially in their native town and in some cities in the east of the country. An important start for the brothers was being hired by a teacher, Chiquitín Payan, to enliven activities at Casa de Campo, a Resort in La Romana, a town in their country.

In 1980 the band recorded their first single "Maria Guayando" which quickly caught the attention of the public. So they decided to move to the capital city Santo Domingo and released their first album thus resulting in great success. This first album contained these hit songs: "Las Locas", "Vengo Acabando", "Bonifacio" y "El Lápiz".

In 1983 the group suffered a tremendous loss when the leader, pianist and musical director, Pepe Rosario, died. This situation forced Los Hermanos Rosario to suspend their activities for a while and even caused the members to think of ending their musical career.

However, the orchestra was able to bounce back from their loss. After the loss of a brother, a mentor, and an outstanding musician, the brothers rose out of the ashes and placed themselves at the top of the artistic scene. In 1987, they launched a new album titled "Acabando" which contained songs that have surpassed the time barrier. These title songs include: "Borrón y Cuenta Nueva", "Adolescente" and "La Luna Coqueta".

A successful career started, and Los Hermanos Rosario continued reaching new heights of popularity. Hits such as "Otra Vez", "Fuera de Serie" and "Insuperables" made the band one of the most listened to musicians in the Dominican Republic. Songs such as "Rubia de Fuego", "Ingrata", "Mi Tonto Amor", "Bomba", "Cumandé", "Loquito Por Ti", "Dime", "Esa Morena", "Bríndame Una Copa", "Desde Que la Ví", "Mil Horas" and "Pecadora" kept the band under the spotlight. The song "Pecadora" was included in the soundtrack of the 1991 film Tacones Lejanos, a Spanish production directed by Pedro Almodóvar.

The group launched another album in 1993 titled "Los Mundialmente Sabrosos". The first single of this album, "Amor, Amor", reached number one on the Tropical music charts in the United States, Puerto Rico, The Dominican Republic, Central America, Venezuela and Colombia. "Amor, Amor" situated Rosario Brothers in Billboard Magazine and with the second single, titled "Morena Ven", they manage to become the first act within the Merengue genre, situating in the top 10 of Billboard Magazine (a position reached so high only by Juan Luís Guerra). That song became an anthem in the Spanish world, consolidating them as the most valued and popular Dominican ensemble abroad. "The Wretched", "Oh, woman", "Slave of your love" and "Good luck" make the list of records which were also hit songs of that work.

In 1995 Los Hermanos Rosario launched the album that would be the most internationally successful of their career to this date, "Los Dueños del Swing" (in English: "The Owners of Swing") selling over 200,000 copies in its first three months of being distributed. This disc, with excellent speed and quality, with the single "La Dueña del Swing" (in English: "The Mistress of Swing"), placed on top of all the Latinos Hit Parades. This album was honored by Billboard magazine as Tropical Music Album of the year: it became one of the most popular merengue record in the history of this style, with essential reference for all Latin music clubs in the world. Together with "The Owner of Swing", the theme "A day in New York" became quite a musical event, and the same happened with "kleptomaniac", "Video Clip", "Candy", "Hot Women", "oleyl", "Oh, how lonely" and "Woman banned". As of 1999, the album sold 500,000 copies.

After that topping album, the band released their first Billboard charts number-one hit Latin music album "Y Es Facil" (1997), followed by "Bomba 2000" (2000) and "Swing A Domicilio" (2002), which continued an unstoppable way of recording with topics which have been true musical events: "The Rompecintura", "The Weekend", "Feel", "It freed me", "To your recollection" and "I like".

During its career, the group has taken their music across the Americas and Europe: the Carnegie Hall, Madison Square Garden, Lincoln Center, Radio City Music Hall, the Polyhedron of Venezuela, Latin American Festival of Milan, Rome Festival, London, Madrid, Amsterdam, Brussels, Zurich, Berlin, etc. are among the places where they performed. They have been awarded multiple times with the "Congo de Oro" (Golden Congo) at the Carnival of Barranquilla, in Colombia. Their award of "Super Congo de Oro" (Super Golden Congo), in Puerto Rico, generated a craze with their music, becoming a source of inspiration for many merengue interpreters of neighboring islands, who found in Rosario Brothers an input to develop their careers along the lines of the Merengue Bomba genre.

After an inadvertent removal of the recording studio in 2003 for a legal dispute with his former record label Karen Records, which remained without a new record for 5 years, Los Hermanos Rosario came back on track with their new album in 2007 titled "Aura", which was released under the label "J&N Records" and "Sony BMG Music Entertainment". This album contains 13 tracks, which already began to play in major radio stations across America a song entitled "Alò", a lilting Bachata Merengue merged with authoring and arrangements by Sandy MC, Jorge and Rafael Rosario, and is destined to become another success of Rosario Brothers.This recording session was entirely made in the Dominican Republic, and for this the Rosary Agency gave the services of the best technicians, composers, musicians and arrangers of their country. With the album "Aura" the band confirmed their qualities and commitments to the merengue genre, blending the typical style with other musical elements and innovative colors in wearing.The album sold 30,000 copies as of 2009.

== Discography ==
=== Studio albums ===
- 1983: Vol. 1
- 1984: Vol. 2
- 1985: Vol. 3
- 1987: Acabando!
- 1988: Otra Vez!
- 1990: Fuera de Serie
- 1991: Insuperables
- 1993: Los Mundialmente Sabrosos
- 1995: Los Dueños del Swing
- 1997: Y Es Fácil!
- 1999: Bomba 2000
- 2002: Swing a Domicilio
- 2007: Aura

=== Compilations ===
- 1988: Lo Mejor de los Hermanos Rosario
- 1989: Lo Mejor de los Hermanos Rosario Vol. 2
- 1993: 14 Éxitos Impresionantes
- 1994: Juntos Con Sus Éxitos
- 1997: El Disco de Oro
- 1998: La Historia Musical Rosario
- 2001: 20 Aniversario
- 2003: Grandes Éxitos
- 2005: Grandes Éxitos Vol. 2
- 2006: Antología Musical
- 2007: CD Económico de Santo Domingo
- 2007: La Bomba
- 2010: XXX Los Rosario: 30 Años de Swing
