= Venemusic =

Vene Music
- Founded: 1950
- Distributor(s): Universal Music Latin Entertainment
- Genre: Latin music
- Country of origin: U.S.
- Location: Coral Gables, Florida
- Official website: www.venemusic.com

Vene Music is an independent Latin music record label based in Coral Gables, Florida. The label is affiliated with Universal Music Latin Entertainment.

== Divisions ==
- Siente Music

== Roster ==
- Chico & the Gypsies
- Cosculluela
- Crazy Design & Carlitos Wey
- El Compa Chuy
- Elvis Crespo
- Farruko
- Los Galakticos
- Gocho
- Héctor Acosta "El Torito"
- Henry Santos
- Los Huracanes del Norte
- Issa Gadala
- Ivy Queen
- Jerry Rivera
- Joseph Fonseca
- Kalimete
- La Dinastía de Tuzantla
- Los Amos
- Los Hermanos Rosario
- Los Pikadientes
- Lucero
- Luis Miguel del Amargue
- Manny Manuel
- Milly Quezada
- Monchy & Natalia
- Pepe Aguilar
- Rogelio Martinez
- Tercer Cielo
- Tierra Cali
- Tito El Bambino
- Yanni
- Sheryl Rubio
