= Manny Manuel =

Puerto Rican musician (born 1972)

- Also known as: Rey de Corazones
- Born: Cruz Manuel Hernández Santiago; December 1, 1972 (age 53)
- Origin: Orocovis, Puerto Rico
- Genres: Merengue; bolero; tropical
- Occupations: Musician; singer
- Instrument: Vocals
- Years active: 1980s–present

Cruz Manuel Hernández Santiago (born December 1, 1972), known artistically as Manny Manuel, is a Puerto Rican musician and singer of merengue, bolero, and tropical music. He became famous first as a member of the group Los Sabrosos del Merengue, before launching a successful solo career in 1994.

== Early life ==
Manny Manuel was born in the mountain town of Orocovis, Puerto Rico. He studied elementary and high school in the José Rojas Cortés School at his hometown. Since a young age, he started presenting himself in talent shows and other musical activities. He later joined the group Tempo Merenguero, and subsequently became a vocalist and choreographer for the merengue duo of Mayra y Celinés.

== Musical career ==
After several years, Manuel joined the group Los Sabrosos del Merengue, debuting with the hit song "Fiera Callada". After the success of the song, the group released their first album, Sin Fronteras, featuring Manuel prominently in the lyrics. The album even included a cover version of Rocío Dúrcal's song "Te Amo". The group continued with their second album titled Haciendo Historia. These included hits like "Colegiala" and "Frente a Frente", among others.

=== Soloist career ===
After recording these two albums with Los Sabrosos, Manuel decided to pursue a solo career. In June 1994, Manuel left the group and on October 1 of the same year debuted as a solo artist. Several months later, he released his first solo album titled Rey de Corazones. The album was certified platinum after a few weeks. With the success of the album, in November 1995, Manuel presented himself at the Luis A. Ferré Performing Arts Center selling out six shows.

In 1996, he released his second album titled Auténtico followed by concerts at the Guaynabo Performing Arts Center and at the Roberto Clemente Coliseum. The following year, he collaborated with several artists in concerts and albums like:

- Performances with Trío Los Condes, especially the song "Querube".
- Collaboration with Antonio Cabán Vale "El Topo" titled Lo que mi Pueblo Atesora.
- Recording the Salsa song "Payaso" from Raphy Leavitt.
- Release of the album Manuel y el Trío Borínquen comprising traditional boleros.
- Recording the song "Dame la mano y ven" (a Spanish version of the Beatles hit song "I Want to Hold Your Hand") for the album Tropical Tribute to the Beatles.
- Performances of several of Bobby Capó's hits for the album Siempre Piel Canela released by Banco Popular.

=== 2000–present ===
Manuel released his next album titled Es Mi Tiempo in 1998 which included the hits "Como duele", "Margarita", and a cover of Alejandro Sanz' song "Corazón partío". The album took him on a tour through Spain where the album was certified gold. His next album, Lleno de Vida, preceded a second presentation at the Roberto Clemente Coliseum. This concert was recorded and later released on CD.

After a change of labels and a move to the United States, Manuel released the album Serenata in 2003, which included covers of traditional romantic songs. The album sold over 100,000 and Manuel followed it with yet another presentation at the Coliseum in 2004. For this album, he was also nominated for a Latin Grammy.

In 2007, he released another album, Tengo Tanto, which included fusions of merengue with other Caribbean rhythms like vallenato. Manuel was one of several artists selected to perform in "KQ Live Concert" on September 27, 2008, organized by KQ 105 FM, the event included several renowned artists from Puerto Rico and other Latin American locations.

=== Accident and controversy ===
On December 29, 2011 a bloody and seriously injured Manny Manuel was found by the side of the Baldorioty de Castro Avenue in San Juan, Puerto Rico in critical condition after witnesses claim he was a victim of a hit and run by an unidentified vehicle. Further investigations are now revealing this could not have been an accident, but an intentional attack against the singer. Investigations are currently being conducted to clarify the latest developments. The Puerto Rican singer went to Orlando and to receive "help in all aspects", this according to his publicist. He released a new album in 2014 Serenata Vol. 2. On August 22, 2014 Manny Manuel celebrated his 20 years as a singer, with a concert in "El Coliseo Bellas Artes", in Puerto Rico.

On February 24, 2019, after showing clear signs of drunkness, he was ejected of Las Palmas de Gran Canaria carnival by government officials. After of this, the City Hall of Santa Cruz de Tenerife and the Consistory of the Puerto de la Cruz also canceled the concerts that the artist was going to give in those cities.

== Discography ==
- Especialmente Para Ti! (1994)
- Rey de Corazones (1995)
- Auténtico (1996)
- Es Mi Tiempo (1998)
- Lleno de Vida (1999)
- Manny Manuel (2002)
- Serenata (2003)
- Nostalgia (2004)
- Tengo Tanto (2007)
- Rayando el Sol (2010)
- Serenata Vol. 2 (2014)

== See also ==
- List of Puerto Ricans
