= Sanky Panky 2 =

2013 Dominican comedy film

Sanky Panky 2: Objetivo Italia
- Directed by: José Enrique Pintor
- Written by: José Enrique Pintor; Miguel Alcántara
- Produced by: Franklin Romero; Franklin Romero Jr. Sandhy Cuesta
- Starring: Fausto Mata; Tony Pascual; Aquiles Correa; Alina Vargas; Zdenka Kalina; Massimo Borghetti; Pericles Mejía; Verónica López
- Cinematography: Elías Acosta
- Edited by: Pedro Ángel López
- Music by: Pachy Carrasco
- Production company: Premium Latin Films
- Distributed by: Caribbean Films Distribution
- Release dates: 31 October 2013 (Dominican Republic and Puerto Rico)
- Running time: 99 minutes
- Country: Dominican Republic
- Language: Spanish
- Box office: RD$99.9 million (Worldwide)

Sanky Panky 2: Objetivo Italia, also known as Sanky Panky 2, is a 2013 Dominican Republic comedy film directed by José Enrique Pintor and written by Pintor and Miguel Alcántara. It is the sequel to Sanky Panky (2007) and the second installment in the Sanky Panky film series. The film stars Fausto Mata, Tony Pascual and Aquiles Correa, who reprise their respective roles as Genaro, Chelo and Carlitos.

Set eight months after the events of the original film, the story follows Genaro as he continues working at a Caribbean resort while attempting to maintain his relationship with La Morena. His life becomes increasingly complicated after the arrival of an Italian family associated with organized crime and the unexpected return of Martha, the American tourist from the first film.

The film was released simultaneously in the Dominican Republic and Puerto Rico on 31 October 2013. The Dominican General Directorate of Cinema later recorded 261,080 admissions in Dominican theaters during 2013.

== Plot ==
Eight months after the events of the first film, Genaro continues working as an entertainer at a luxury resort managed by his friend Giuseppe. Although he is in a relationship with La Morena, he has not entirely abandoned his reputation as a sanky-panky, a man who attempts to establish romantic relationships with foreign tourists.

Giuseppe asks Genaro to attend to a visiting Italian family led by Don Benito. The group includes Don Benito's wife, his nieces and the enigmatic Mamma Mía, an elderly woman who uses a wheelchair. Genaro is unaware that Don Benito has ulterior motives involving the family and intends to use him as a convenient scapegoat.

The situation becomes more complicated when Chelo and Carlitos return to the Dominican Republic from the United States. They arrive with Martha, the American tourist whom Genaro met in the first film. Martha is pregnant, raising questions about whether Genaro may be the father and creating further tension between him and La Morena.

After Mamma Mía disappears, Don Benito kidnaps La Morena and demands an exchange. Chelo disguises himself as Mamma Mía while Genaro and Carlitos attempt to rescue her. Giuseppe ultimately intervenes with the authorities, leading to the arrest of Don Benito and his accomplices. Martha gives birth to twins and later returns to the United States. Genaro and La Morena reconcile and marry at the resort.

== Cast ==
The film features returning performers from the first installment as well as Dominican, Italian-Dominican and Puerto Rican cast members.

- Fausto Mata as Genaro
- Tony Pascual as Chelo
- Aquiles Correa as Carlitos
- Alina Vargas as La Morena
- Zdenka Kalina as Martha
- Massimo Borghetti as Giuseppe
- Pericles Mejía as Don Benito
- Verónica López as Mamma Mía
- Jacqueline Ventura as Don Benito's wife
- Alfonso Alemán, known as El Guitarreño, as Freddy
- María del Mar Bonelly as one of Don Benito's nieces
- Mariel Alliata Bronner as one of Don Benito's nieces
- Maximiliano Borghetti as Giuseppe's son
- Víctor José Pintor as Tito
- Roberto Cavada as a priest (cameo)
- Wason Brazobán as himself
- Eddy Herrera as himself
- Elvis Martínez as himself
- Milly Quezada as herself

== Production ==
=== Early development ===
The first public announcements concerning a second installment of Sanky Panky appeared in January 2008. Actor Fausto Mata stated that filming would soon begin on a sequel provisionally titled Sanky Panky USA. Director José Enrique Pintor later also listed a screenplay under that title among his original works.

A report, stated that Premium Latin Films planned to begin production in May 2008 and conduct most of the filming in New York City. Pintor was expected to return as director, while Mata, Aquiles Correa, and Tony Pascual would reprise their roles. The report attributed a gross of 75 million Dominican pesos and attendance of more than 700,000 viewers to the first film. The attendance figure was cited again by the newspaper Hoy in 2009.

In September 2008, the press began referring to the project as Sanky Panky II. Pre-production was marked by disagreements between Pintor and Mata concerning the actor's participation in the film Megadivas. Following a meeting between the director, the lead actor, and other members of the production team, it was announced that filming would begin during the final week of October 2008 in Bávaro, continue in other locations in the Dominican Republic, and conclude with filming in Rochester and an action sequence in downtown Miami. The film was scheduled for release in 2009.

During the disagreements that arose in pre-production, Pintor satirically announced that he would put the materials prepared for the film up for sale, including the screenplay, the storyboard, the production plan and breakdown, the budget, and a clapperboard labeled Sanky Panky 2. After reconciling with Mata, the director stated that he would resume the project. However, the announced production schedule did not materialize.

In March 2009, Pintor stated that the film had not been canceled and denied that its budget had increased. He explained that the delay was caused by negotiations to secure international distribution and by the search for foreign actors through a representative based in Los Angeles. According to the director, the new screenplay was being developed to appeal to a broader Latin American audience rather than being limited exclusively to the Dominican market.

In May 2009, Pintor stated that he had already written a screenplay for Sanky Panky 2, with the story taking place in the United States. Although he believed that producing the sequel there would have been the most direct route into the American film industry, he said that he preferred to develop a romantic drama first in order to avoid being typecast as a comedy director.

According to a column later published by journalist José Rafael Sosa, one of the early versions of the project included car chase sequences in downtown Miami and special effects inspired by those used in The Matrix.

=== Final production ===
The definitive version began filming in May 2013, five years after the initial announcements. The film was produced by Premium Latin Films, with José Enrique Pintor returning as director. Pintor co-wrote the screenplay with Miguel Alcántara, Sandhy Cuesta served as producer, and Franklin Romero, president of Premium Latin, was credited as executive producer and general producer.

Pintor explained that the sequel sought to reduce the exclusively local character of its humor and storyline by introducing characters and situations that could be understood by audiences from other Latin American countries.

Fausto Mata, Aquiles Correa, Tony Pascual, Alina Vargas, Zdenka Kalina, and Massimo Borghetti reprised their roles from the first film. The cast was expanded to include Verónica López, Pericles Mejía, Jacqueline Ventura, Alfonso Alemán, Marielle Alliata, and María del Mar López, several of whom portrayed members of the Italian family introduced in the story. During filming, Kalina's real-life pregnancy was incorporated into the storyline of her character, Martha.

Filming took place primarily at the Barceló Bávaro Hotel, in the eastern tourist region of the Dominican Republic. The hotel complex, which had also been used in the first film, served as the main location for several weeks, and some of its guests participated as extras. Filming concluded on 18 June 2013.

One of the most logistically complex sequences was filmed at night in a restricted area of Punta Cana International Airport. The scene required eleven vehicles, members of counterterrorism units, police officers, paramedics, and numerous extras. The crew had to complete filming before the airport fully resumed its operations.

Pintor estimated the production budget at more than 40 million Dominican pesos, excluding taxes, compared with the approximately 33 million pesos that, according to his statements, the first installment had cost. The director attributed part of the increase to inflation and to the legal, administrative, accounting, and tax-related expenses associated with the implementation of the Dominican Republic's Film Industry Promotion Law.

Elías Acosta returned as director of photography. The film was shot with high-definition digital cameras and lenses selected to emphasize the brightness and warmth of the Caribbean scenery. The production team also established a visual palette of vivid, tropical colors, applied particularly to the costumes and production design.

The production was dedicated to the memory of Nuryn Sanlley, who had portrayed Dorothy in the first film and died before she could participate in the sequel. The film included a scene conceived as a tribute to the actress.

By July 2013, the film was in the final stages of post-production and sound mixing. It was eventually released on 31 October of that year under the subtitle Objetivo Italia.

=== Filming ===
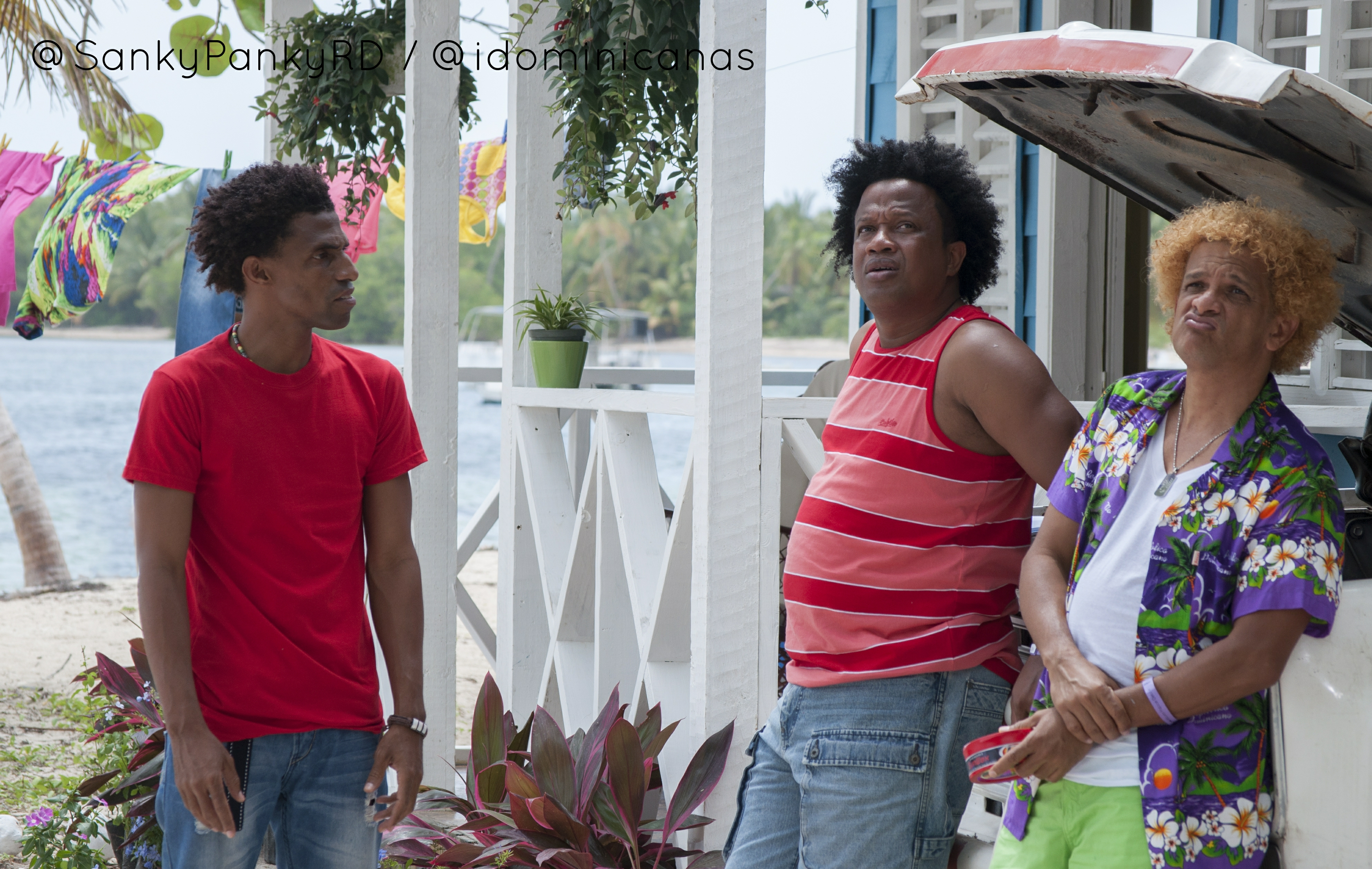
Filming of Sanky Panky 2 in June 2013.

Principal photography took place in May and June 2013 at the Barceló Bávaro resort complex in the eastern Dominican Republic. The hotel served as the principal filming location for several weeks, while tourists staying at the resort participated as extras.

The film was shot with high-definition digital cameras and specialized lenses intended to emphasize the warmth of the Caribbean setting. The production was dedicated to the memory of Nuryn Sanlley, who portrayed Dorothy in the first film.

Zdenka Kalina was pregnant during filming. Her pregnancy was incorporated into the storyline of Martha, her returning character from the original film.

During filming, former Dominican president Hipólito Mejía, who served from 2000 to 2004, visited the set. A report published after journalist Roberto Cavada shared a photograph on Twitter showed Mejía posing alongside Fausto Mata. Although the report speculated about a possible appearance in the film, no credited acting role for Mejía was confirmed.

== Music ==
The score was composed by Pachy Carrasco. The film also featured musical contributions and appearances by Milly Quezada, Elvis Martínez, Wason Brazobán and Eddy Herrera.

Quezada and Martínez performed the song Y es que yo quiero. Brazobán contributed songs connected to the film, while Herrera recorded a musical appearance for the sequel.

== Promotion ==
The promotional campaign began several months before the theatrical release and included music-related appearances by the invited performers.

A smartphone video game based on the film was developed by Moros Studios. It allowed users to select caricatured versions of Genaro, Chelo and Carlitos and attempt to win over tourists of different nationalities. Diario Libre described the project as the first smartphone video game in the Dominican Republic associated with a local feature film.

== Release and box office ==
Sanky Panky 2: Objetivo Italia opened simultaneously in the Dominican Republic and Puerto Rico on 31 October 2013. Primera Hora reported that it was the first film to open in both territories at the same time.

According to a press release cited by Primera Hora, the film set attendance records during its opening day and first four days of exhibition in Puerto Rico. It ranked first in the 29 theaters in which it was shown, ahead of films including Gravity.

Caribbean Films Distribution and Premium Latin Films reported that the film drew more than 93,000 admissions during its extended opening weekend in the Dominican Republic, including the public holiday on 4 November. Additional screenings were added to meet demand. The companies also reported 1,385 admissions at Bávaro at San Juan Shopping Center and 3,243 admissions at Caribbean Cinemas in Colinas Mall, Santiago, on 3 November.

The Dominican General Directorate of Cinema recorded 261,080 admissions in Dominican theaters during 2013. A 2024 retrospective published by Acento reported a domestic gross of RD$42.1 million, approximately 58.6 percent more than the Dominican gross later reported for Sanky Panky 3.

In December 2013, the Dominican media outlet 12 y 2 reported that the film had grossed US$1.35 million in Puerto Rico during its fourth week of exhibition. The publication attributed the figure to Juan Paris, who had acquired the film's Puerto Rican exhibition rights.

== Critical reception ==
Critical reception was mixed. Alfonso Quiñones of Diario Libre praised the Caribbean color palette and Elías Acosta's cinematography, as well as the performances of the three principal actors, Alina Vargas, Massimo Borghetti and Verónica López. He criticized the repetition of certain musical fragments, the limited dramatic use of several supporting characters and the editing pace, while describing the film as an entertaining and recognizably Dominican comedy.

Félix Manuel Lora of Acento considered the Italian-family storyline functional in parts and praised Acosta's cinematography and the use of colorful costumes. He also argued that several jokes felt forced and that the musical sequences were insufficiently integrated into the narrative. Lora concluded that, despite its weaknesses, the sequel fulfilled its purpose as a comedy intended for Dominican and international audiences.

== Accolades ==
At the 2014 Soberano Awards, Alina Vargas and Verónica López received nominations for Best Actress for their performances in the film.

Cinema Dominicano also listed nominations for the film at the 2013 La Silla Awards in multiple categories, including Best Film, Best Comedy, Best Director, Best Producer, Best Lead Actor, Best Lead Actress, Best Supporting Actor, Best Supporting Actress, Best Screenplay, Best Cinematography, Best Art Direction, Best Costume Design, Best Editing and Best Music.

== Sequels ==
In 2016, Premium Latin Films announced that the rights to produce a third installment had been sold to SK3 LLC, a company headed by Puerto Rican producer Carlos Nido and associated with Piñolywood Studios. Sanky Panky 3 was released in 2018.

The franchise later continued with Sanky Panky 4: de safari, released in the Dominican Republic in 2025.

== See also ==
- Sanky Panky
- Cinema of the Dominican Republic
- Sanky-panky
