= Sanky Panky 3 =

2018 Dominican Republic comedy film

- Theatrical release poster
- Directed by: Eduardo Ortiz
- Written by: Miguel Morales
- Produced by: Socorro Torres
- Starring: Fausto Mata; Tony Pascual; Aquiles Correa; Jazmín Caratini; Jorge Pabón
- Cinematography: Carlos Zayas
- Edited by: Andrés Ramírez
- Music by: Danny Donati
- Production company: Piñolywood Studios
- Distributed by: Caribbean Films Distribution
- Release dates: 29 March 2018 (Dominican Republic); 5 April 2018 (Puerto Rico)
- Running time: 105 minutes
- Country: Dominican Republic
- Language: Spanish
- Budget: Approximately US$1.5 million

Sanky Panky 3 is a 2018 Dominican Republic comedy film directed by Puerto Rican filmmaker Eduardo Ortiz and written by Miguel Morales. It is the third installment in the Dominican Republic film series that began with Sanky Panky in 2007 and continued with Sanky Panky 2: Objetivo Italia in 2013.

The film stars Fausto Mata, Tony Pascual and Aquiles Correa, reprising their respective roles as Genaro, Chelo and Carlitos. Unlike the first two installments, which were directed by José Enrique Pintor, the third film moves most of its action to Puerto Rico and incorporates performers from both the Dominican Republic and Puerto Rico. Puerto Rican outlet CineXpress described the production as a collaboration between the film industries of the Dominican Republic and Puerto Rico.

Sanky Panky 3 was released theatrically in the Dominican Republic on 29 March 2018 by Caribbean Films Distribution. It opened in Puerto Rico on 5 April 2018.

== Plot ==
Following his divorce from La Morena, Genaro is experiencing a period of personal discouragement. He is no longer employed as a chicken mascot at the hotel where he had previously attempted to use his abilities as a sanky-panky. His inseparable friends Chelo and Carlitos try to lift his spirits while pursuing a new opportunity to leave the Dominican Republic, secure visas and seek a better future in Puerto Rico.

Their chance arrives when a Puerto Rican hotel begins searching for a mascot. Chelo and Carlitos take possession of a chicken costume intended for another applicant and travel to the island with Genaro. After arriving in Puerto Rico, the three friends become involved in a succession of comic situations. Chelo attempts to distance himself temporarily from his romantic complications, while Carlitos seeks to expand his street businesses.

The situation becomes increasingly complicated when Genaro develops feelings for Patricia, a publicist and hotel executive played by Jazmín Caratini, while his romantic past returns to interfere with the relationship. The film also introduces a younger generation of aspiring sanky-pankies, known as the pollitos, portrayed by Carlos Sánchez, Bolívar Valera and Gerald Ogando.

== Cast ==
- Fausto Mata as Genaro
- Tony Pascual as Chelo
- Aquiles Correa as Carlitos
- Jazmín Caratini as Patricia
- Jorge Pabón as Anaudy
- Miguel Morales as Bibi
- Alina Vargas as La Morena
- Omar Cruz Soto as DJ Papito
- Ramiro Delgado Ruiz as a merengue dancer
- Alexandra Malagón as the presenter
- Rafa Sánchez as Manolo Castañeda
- Carlos Sánchez as Pollito
- Bolívar Valera as Pollito
- Gerald Ogando as Pollito
- Luz María Rondón
- Modesto Lacén
- Efraín López Neris

Several principal and supporting roles are listed in the Apple TV catalogue. Additional cast members were reported by Primera Hora during the film's promotion in Puerto Rico.

== Production ==
=== Development ===
In June 2016, Diario Libre reported that Premium Latin Films had reached an agreement with SK3 LLC, a company chaired by Puerto Rican producer Carlos J. Nido and associated with Piñolywood Studios, to develop a third installment in the franchise. José Enrique Pintor, who directed and wrote the first two films, remained involved with the project through its production team.

During filming, Nido stated that the Sanky Panky brand remained the property of Franklin Romero, while the agreement granted Nido long-term rights to the franchise films that he produced. Executive production was handled by Nido, while Socorro Torres served as producer.

A notice published by the Dominican Republic's General Directorate of Cinema in August 2016 initially projected that filming would begin near the end of that year and that the film would receive a commercial release during the first half of 2017. The film ultimately opened in March 2018.

=== Filming ===
The film was shot almost entirely in Puerto Rico. Major locations included the Hotel El Conquistador in Fajardo and several areas of Santurce. The screenplay was adapted to move the action of the franchise to the island and to use the hotel as a central setting.

Nido estimated that the production budget was approximately US$1.5 million. Ortiz had previously worked with Mata, Pascual, Correa and Pabón on the comedy film Los domirriqueños. He later explained that he had approached Sanky Panky 3 as a Dominican Republic film shot in Puerto Rico rather than as a departure from the identity of the previous installments.

A 2025 retrospective published by Listín Diario reported that the three lead actors gave seven live performances while they were in Puerto Rico, despite the fact that only one appearance had originally been planned. Their combined audience exceeded 2,000 people.

== Release ==
The Dominican Republic premiere took place on 26 March 2018 at the Caribbean Cinemas complex in Downtown Center, Santo Domingo. The film opened commercially in the Dominican Republic on 29 March, coinciding with Maundy Thursday, under the distribution of Caribbean Films Distribution.

The Puerto Rican theatrical release followed on 5 April 2018. During the promotional campaign, future screenings were announced for Orlando, New York, several South American countries and potentially Spain. Additional distribution in Latin America and the United States was also planned.

== Critical reception ==
The film received mixed reviews from critics. José Rafael Sosa of Acento acknowledged the franchise's ability to generate laughter and attract a broad audience, but argued that the third film should have pursued more restrained performances and a more careful treatment of certain stereotypes. He particularly criticized dialogue involving the representation of women and transgender people.

Joan Prats of Diario Libre concluded that relocating the story to Puerto Rico and changing directors were not enough to renew the established formula. He criticized the screenplay, its use of clichés and several technical aspects of the film, including its cinematography, lighting and musical scoring. However, he noted that the comic timing and chemistry shared by Mata, Pascual and Correa sustained the film's strongest moments.

Fico Cangiano of CineXpress rated the film 2.5 out of 5 stars. His review, later indexed by Rotten Tomatoes, similarly attributed the film's effectiveness as a light comedy to the chemistry among its three Dominican Republic leads.

== See also ==
- Sanky Panky
- Sanky Panky 2: Objetivo Italia
- Sanky Panky 4: De Safari
- Cinema of the Dominican Republic
- Cinema of Puerto Rico
