= José Enrique Pintor =

- Born: José Enrique Pintor Carretero; 20 October 1966 (age 59)
- Other name: Pinky Pintor
- Occupations: Film and television director, producer and screenwriter
- Years active: 1986–present

José Enrique Pintor Carretero (born 20 October 1966), known professionally as Pinky Pintor, is a Spanish-Dominican film and television director, producer and screenwriter. He began his career in audiovisual production in Spain and later settled in the Dominican Republic, where he has worked in television, narrative cinema, documentary filmmaking and live entertainment production.

Pintor is particularly known for directing and writing Sanky Panky (2007), a commercially successful Dominican comedy that developed into a film franchise. He also directed its first sequel, Sanky Panky 2 (2013). His other films include La cárcel de La Victoria: el cuarto hombre (2004), Santicló... La vaina de la navidad (2008), No hay más remedio (2014), Mañana no te olvides (2017), Hay un país en el mundo (2017), Sol y Luna (2019), Culpables (2020), and Santo Domingo, primera de América (2020).

== Career ==
=== Early career ===
Pintor began working in audiovisual media in 1986 as a dubbing director at Imaxe Galega. In 1988, he joined the production company K-2000, where he began directing television productions. He founded the film services company Magma Imagen S.A. in 1991. The following year, the company obtained a contract to provide audiovisual services for Expo '92 in Seville.

Pintor also worked in theatre and radio. He directed the stage productions Cepillo de dientes and Pares y nones. In 1994, he created the radio programme Estación Madrid and directed the short film Sólo para ella.

After settling in the Dominican Republic, Pintor continued working in television and audiovisual production. In 1997, he directed El talk show de Norma A. for Telemundo and later became director of the production company ENEDOM.

=== Television and live productions ===
During the late 1990s, Pintor created or worked on programmes including Punto y seguido, Misión deportiva, Lotto Quiz, La aldea mágica, Super 10, and El señor de los Bancredipuntos. In 1999, he took charge of the creation and production of Divertido con Jochy.

Pintor later became production director of the MEDCOM group, where he participated in the development of programmes such as Bembere, El escándalo del 13, and Farmacia 24 horas. He was also involved with reality television productions including Operación Hispaniola, La casa de cristal, Encadenados, and ¿Quién baila mejor?.

In 2010, Pintor worked as a producer of the Casandra Awards ceremony. As of 2017, he was corporate production director of the electronic media division of Grupo Corripio.

In 2019, Pintor produced the red-carpet television broadcast for the Soberano Awards. During the COVID-19 pandemic, he was involved in the production of educational television programming for preschool students on behalf of the Dominican Ministry of Education.

Pintor co-directed the comedy series Líos de familia with Frank Perozo and co-wrote it with Juan Tejeda. Produced by Caribbean Films and Pantaya, the series was filmed in 2021 and released in 2022. A second season was released in August 2022.

In August 2022, Pintor produced a televised event commemorating the 70th anniversary of Dominican state broadcaster RTVD's Canal 4.

=== Film ===
Pintor made his feature-film directorial debut with La cárcel de La Victoria: el cuarto hombre in 2004. Written and directed by Pintor, the prison drama addressed corruption and living conditions within the Dominican penitentiary system.

In 2007, Pintor directed and wrote Sanky Panky, a comedy starring Fausto Mata, Tony Pascual, Aquiles Correa, and Massimo Borghetti. The film follows a Dominican resort worker who attempts to establish a relationship with a foreign tourist in the hope of leaving the country. It became commercially successful in the Dominican Republic and was subsequently released in international markets, including cinemas in New York and New Jersey.

Pintor later directed the Christmas comedy Santicló... La vaina de la navidad (2008), the sequel Sanky Panky 2 (2013), and the comedy No hay más remedio (2014).

In 2017, he directed and produced the drama Mañana no te olvides, based on an original idea by Pintor. The film centres on the relationship between a teenager with Down syndrome and his grandfather, who has been diagnosed with Alzheimer's disease. Pintor announced that the producer's share of the film's theatrical revenue would be donated to the Yo También Puedo foundation, an organisation supporting people with disabilities through educational and artistic programmes.

Mañana no te olvides won Best Film at the inaugural Castelli Romani Film Festival in Italy in December 2017. The film was later included in the official out-of-competition section of the 44th Huelva Ibero-American Film Festival.

Also in 2017, Pintor directed and wrote the documentary Hay un país en el mundo, which examines Dominican history, culture, geography, music and national identity.

In 2019, he directed Sol y Luna, also released under the title Dos mejor que una. The film was a Dominican-Spanish co-production filmed in Galicia and the Dominican Republic.

Pintor directed and co-wrote the 2020 thriller Culpables with Junior Rosario. The film follows several characters whose lives become interconnected through a homicide investigation.

That same year, Pintor directed and co-wrote the historical docudrama Santo Domingo, primera de América with Dominican journalist Huchi Lora. The production examines the history of Santo Domingo between 1492 and 1551 through documentary narration and dramatic reconstructions.

The film opened the inaugural Cana Dorada International Film Festival in January 2020, where Pintor received a special recognition for the production and his contribution to Dominican cinema. It was also selected for the 2020 Baja California International Film Festival.

In March 2025, an agreement was announced for Santo Domingo, primera de América to be broadcast by Italian public broadcaster RAI as part of the historical television programme 5000 anni e più.

== Recognition ==
At the 2008 Casandra Awards, Pintor received a nomination for Best Director for Sanky Panky.

In 2012, the second Dominican Film Festival in Puerto Rico was dedicated to Pintor and the cast of Sanky Panky.

In 2017, Pintor was selected as a jury member in the television-series category of the Platino Awards. According to Cinema Dominicano, he became the first representative of the Dominican Republic to serve on the jury in that category.

In 2018, Pintor received an Iris Award in the documentary category for Hay un país en el mundo.

In 2020, the ninth Dominican Film Festival in New York included a tribute to Pintor as part of its programme.

=== Selected awards and honours ===
Year	Organisation	Category or honour	Work	Result
2008	Casandra Awards	Best Director	Sanky Panky	Nominated
2012	Dominican Film Festival in Puerto Rico	Festival dedication	José Enrique Pintor and the cast of Sanky Panky	Honoured
2017	Castelli Romani Film Festival	Best Film	Mañana no te olvides	Won
2018	Iris Awards	Documentary	Hay un país en el mundo	Won
2020	Cana Dorada International Film Festival	Special recognition	Santo Domingo, primera de América and contribution to Dominican cinema	Honoured
2020	Dominican Film Festival in New York	Festival tribute	José Enrique Pintor	Honoured

== Filmography ==
=== Film ===
Year	Title	Role	Notes
1994	Sólo para ella	Director	Short film
2004	La cárcel de La Victoria: el cuarto hombre	Director and screenwriter	Feature film
2007	Sanky Panky	Director and screenwriter	Feature film
2008	Santicló... La vaina de la navidad	Director and co-screenwriter	Feature film
2013	Sanky Panky 2	Director and co-screenwriter	Feature film
2014	No hay más remedio	Director	Feature film
2017	Mañana no te olvides	Director and producer	Feature film
2017	Hay un país en el mundo	Director and screenwriter	Documentary film
2019	Sol y Luna, also known as Dos mejor que una	Director and co-screenwriter	Feature film
2020	Santo Domingo, primera de América	Director and co-screenwriter	Historical docudrama
2020	Culpables	Director and co-screenwriter	Feature film

=== Television and live productions ===
Year	Title	Role	Notes
1997	El talk show de Norma A.	Director	Programme produced for Telemundo
1999	Divertido con Jochy	Producer and creator	Television programme
2001	Operación Hispaniola	Producer	Reality television programme
2003	El escándalo del 13	Creator	Daily variety programme
2007	¿Quién baila mejor?	Executive producer	Reality television programme
2010	Yemen	Director	Documentary television production
2010	Casandra Awards	Producer	Televised awards ceremony
2019	Soberano Awards red carpet	Producer	Live television broadcast
2020	Aprendemos en casa: Preprimario	Producer	Educational television programming
2021–2022	Líos de familia	Co-director and co-screenwriter	Pantaya comedy series
2022	Canal 4 70th-anniversary special	Producer	Televised commemorative event
