= Tony Pascual =

Dominican comedian and actor

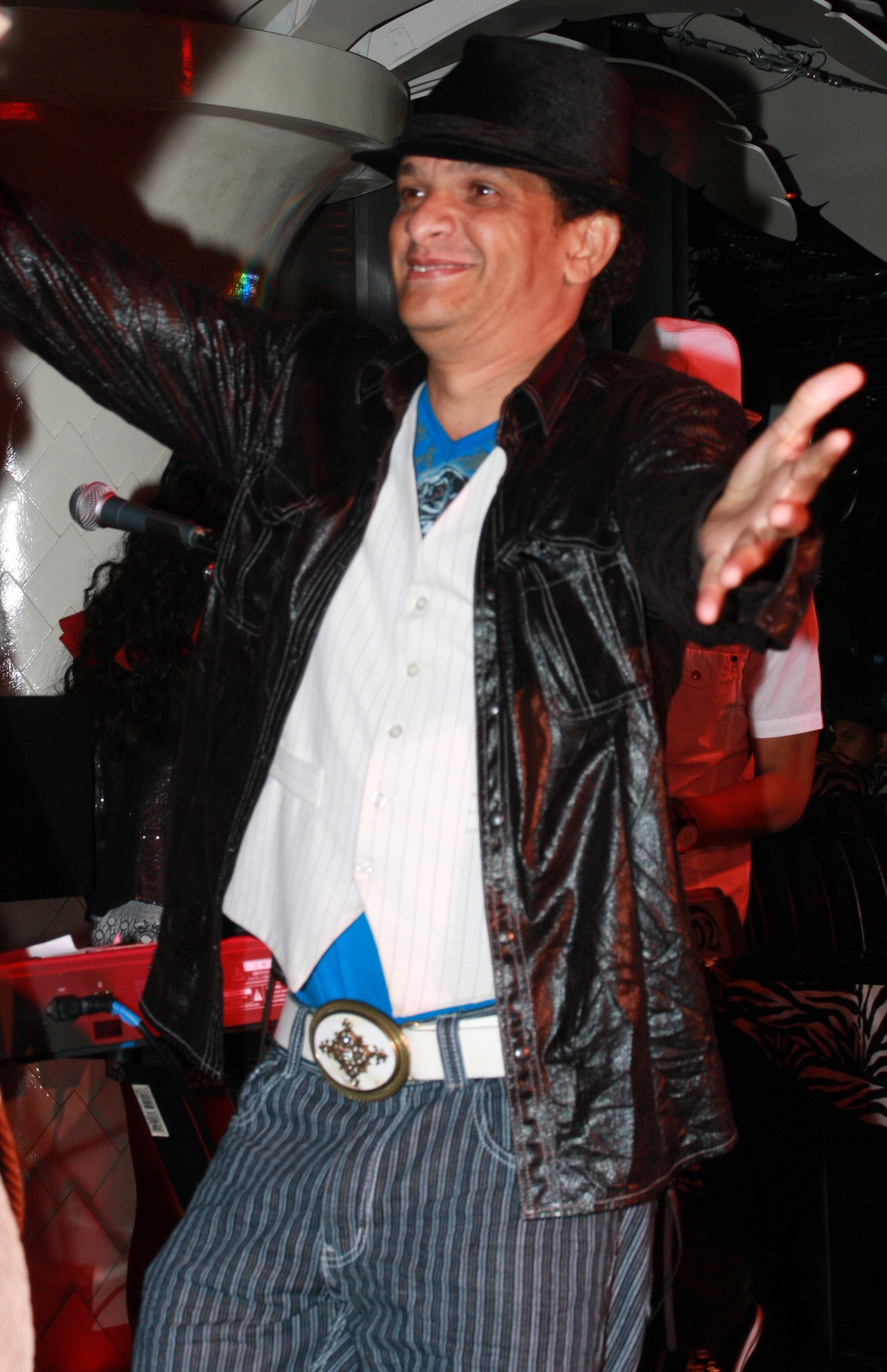
- Pascual in 2009
- Born: April 17, 1970 (age 56); Santo Domingo, Dominican Republic
- Other name: Pachulí
- Occupations: Comedian; actor
- Years active: 1989–present

Tony Pascual (born 17 April 1970), known professionally as Pachulí, is a Dominican comedian and actor. He is known for his work in Dominican television comedy and for playing Chelo in the Sanky Panky film series.

== Career ==
Pascual began his career in the summer of 1989 after his sister encouraged him to attend a casting call organised by Dominican comedian Cuquín Victoria, who was looking for new talent for the television programme Con Cuquín. Pascual initially presented himself as a photographer, but later began performing comedy roles on the programme.

He subsequently joined the cast of Los gánsters, a comedy programme broadcast on the former Canal 6, which later became part of Telemicro. During this period, he developed the character Pachulí, an ingenuous police officer who became one of his best-known television roles. He later appeared in programmes including La opción de las 12 and Títirimundati.

Pascual made his film debut in Perico ripiao and subsequently appeared in Dominican productions including Los locos también piensan, La maldición del padre Cardona, Ponchao and Un lío en dólares. He gained wider recognition for portraying Chelo alongside Fausto Mata and Aquiles Correa in Sanky Panky (2007) and its sequels.

By 2018, Pascual was working across the Dominican Republic and Puerto Rico in film, theatre and television. He starred in the Dominican–Puerto Rican science-fiction comedy Ovni and returned as Chelo in Sanky Panky 3. He also appeared in the Puerto Rican comedy Dos compadres y una yola, the television series Such Is Life and the film El fantasma de mi novia.

Pascual also appeared with Mata, Correa and Puerto Rican comedian Jorge Pabón in Los Domirriqueños 2, which received a theatrical release in the United States in 2019. He later appeared in the comedy film Súper Bomberos.

In 2025, Pascual reprised his role as Chelo in Sanky Panky 4: De Safari, the fourth instalment in the franchise. The film was released theatrically in the Dominican Republic on 15 May 2025.

== Selected filmography ==
=== Film ===
Year	Title	Notes
2003	Perico ripiao	
2005	Los locos también piensan	
2005	La maldición del padre Cardona	
2007	Sanky Panky	Chelo
2012	Mango bajito	
2013	Ponchao	
2013	Sanky Panky 2	Chelo
2014	De pez en cuando	
2014	Un lío en dólares	
2015	Los Domirriqueños	
2016	Ovni	
2017	Misión estrella	
2017	El peor comediante del mundo	
2017	Dos compadres y una yola	
2018	Sanky Panky 3	Chelo
2018	El fantasma de mi novia	
2019	Los Domirriqueños 2	
2019	Súper Bomberos	
2025	Sanky Panky 4: De Safari	Chelo

=== Short films ===
Year	Title
2005	Secuestro
2008	La prenda

=== Television ===
- Con Cuquín
- Los gánsters
- La opción de las 12
- Atrapados
- Títirimundati
- El Kan del 4
- Boca de Piano es un show
- Such Is Life
