= Sanky-panky =

Male sex worker

A sanky-panky or sanky is a male sex worker, found in the Dominican Republic. A sanky-panky solicits on beaches and has clients of either both sexes or only women. When with men, the sanky-panky assumes an active (a.k.a. top) role, but when with women, assumes the role of an ideal lover.

While strictly speaking they are not prostitutes, since they do not directly negotiate money for sex, sanky-pankies are more likely to develop a pseudo-relationship which can be continued after the guest returns home. They then might attempt to ask for money to be sent to them primarily by wire transfer, often using elaborate stories of need, involving (for example) sick relatives. A sanky's ultimate goal is often to obtain a marriage visa to the tourist's native country, and marry the tourist before abandoning her.

Another word used for a sanky panky is chapeador (or chapi chapi) A lady is called a chapeadora. This word is derived from the verb "chapear" (to trim or cut, especially with a machete).

== Bricheros ==
In Peru they are known as bricheros (who are male and usually target female tourists) and bricheras (who are females targeting male tourists). They frequent popular tourist destinations and may involve themselves in tourist businesses in order to solicit customers.

== "Puta-Tour" ==
In certain tourist cities of Venezuela, and especially in the city of Mérida, women following a similar pattern of conduct are known as "Puta-Tour," a pejorative term associated with travel-based prostitution. Nevertheless, there are cases where sexual intercourse is never consummated and long term friendships are the result. Such women usually target White American and European tourists, primarily in the interest of learning and/or practicing a foreign language other than Spanish, serving also as hosts and tourist guides, but with the expectation of being invited to travel to the tourist's native country. These relationships can range from friendship to marriage, and are based on cultural interchange and travel, supported by the foreign tourist.

== Sanky-pankies in popular culture ==
The persona of the "sanky panky" was brought to the cinema in 2007 by Spanish director José Enrique Pintor (Pinky). In his comedic film entitled Sanky Panky, audiences follow the life of a young Dominican man named Genaro (played by Dominican comedian Fausto Mata) who, thanks to his childhood friend Giuseppe (Massimo Borghetti), the manager of a hotel chain, travels to Bávaro to work at a resort in hopes of finding a "gringa" (or white American woman) who will give him a visa. In the process, he meets a young heartbroken woman and her two older and oversexed aunts. The story that follows highlights the attractions of Dominican resorts but also portrays the realities of poverty in the Dominican Republic, while immortalizing the figure of the "sanky panky" via the medium of a major motion picture.

A film that explores this topic in a Francophone context is Heading South.
