= Brazobán =

Brazobán is a surname. Notable people with the surname include:

- Huascar Brazobán (born 1989), Dominican baseball pitcher
- Wason Brazobán (born 1969), Dominican musician and songwriter
- Yhency Brazobán (born 1980), Dominican baseball pitcher
