= OVNI =

OVNI is an abbreviation corresponding to UFO in several non-English languages.

OVNI or Ovni may also refer to:

- Ovni (film), a 2016 Dominican film
- OVNI(s), a French TV series
- El OVNI, a nickname for Liverpool Interlomas in Mexico
- OVNI, the title of an album by the French band Odezenne
