= Honoret =

Honoret is a surname. Notable people with the surname include:

- Edwin Honoret (born 1999), American singer from boy band Prettymuch
- Yameiry Infante Honoret (born 1985), Dominican performer
