= Premium Latin Music =

- Founded: 1996
- Founder: Franklin Romero
- Genre: Bachata, merengue, tropical music, Latin pop, Latin urban
- Country of origin: United States
- Location: The Bronx, New York City, United States (original location); Santo Domingo, Dominican Republic (headquarters announced in 2018)

Premium Latin Music is an independent Latin record label founded in 1996 in New York City by Dominican businessman and music promoter Franklin Romero. The company is primarily known for supporting the international development of the bachata group Aventura, whose catalogue contributed to the expansion of urban bachata in the United States, Latin America and Europe.

In addition to releasing and distributing recordings, the company developed activities in artist management, music production, publishing administration and film production through related companies and divisions including Premium Latin Management, Premium Latin Publishing and Premium Latin Films.

== History ==
=== Foundation and early years ===
Franklin Romero founded Premium Latin Music in 1996 as a company dedicated to artist management, record production and music distribution.

During its early period, the company operated from a commercial establishment in the Bronx, where Romero was involved in the promotion of Dominican music and live entertainment.

Before establishing the company, Romero had worked as an artist and event promoter in New York. According to later statements by Romero, bachata singer Elvis Martínez was among the first performers in the genre to join the record company. Martínez became associated with Premium Latin around 1998, before the international expansion the label would experience with Aventura.

Other early artists and groups associated with the company included Elvis Martínez, Los Huracanes, Negros—also identified in some publications as Grupo Negros—Wason Brazobán and Ciudad de Ángeles.

=== Aventura and international expansion ===
During the late 1990s, the group then known as Los Tinellers began working with Premium Latin Music. According to an account published by The Fader, the group was introduced to Franklin Romero around 1997, when Romero was operating the label from a Bronx storefront.

The group subsequently adopted the name Aventura and was marketed as a young bachata act influenced by contemporary R&B, hip hop and New York urban culture.

In 1999, Premium Latin released Generation Next, the group's first album under the Aventura name. The production introduced stylistic elements that would later become associated with the group, including English-language phrases, electronic guitar effects, funk-influenced bass lines and R&B-derived vocal melodies.

The group's commercial breakthrough came with We Broke the Rules, released in 2002. The album included “Obsesión”, which received international airplay and appeared on national music charts in several European and Latin American countries.

The success of “Obsesión” established Aventura as one of the most internationally prominent bachata groups and considerably expanded the reach of Premium Latin Music's catalogue.

During the following decade, Premium Latin Music released Aventura's principal albums, including Love & Hate (2003), God's Project (2005), K.O.B. Live (2006), Kings of Bachata: Sold Out at Madison Square Garden (2007) and The Last (2009). These releases consolidated the group's fusion of bachata with pop, R&B, hip hop and other urban styles.

Music executive Marti Cuevas held management and administrative responsibilities within the company during Aventura's period of growth. The National Music Publishers’ Association identifies Cuevas as the former general manager of Premium Latin Music and states that her company, Mayimba Music, administered Romeo Santos' publishing catalogue for approximately ten years.

During the early 2000s, Cuevas also assumed responsibility for a significant portion of the label's day-to-day operations in New York while Romero was absent from the United States.

=== Catalogue expansion ===
Although Aventura became Premium Latin Music's most commercially prominent project, the company worked with performers in bachata, merengue, tropical music, Latin pop and Latin urban music.

Artists and groups identified by the company or by news publications as being associated with Premium Latin through recording contracts, production, artist management, distribution or catalogue exploitation include:

- Aventura
- Elvis Martínez
- Wason Brazobán
- Negros
- Eddy Herrera
- Anthony Santos
- Rita Indiana and Los Misterios
- Jeffrey
- Johnny Sky
- Eddy K
- JoaQuin
- Ciudad de Ángeles
- Tony Fox
- Jeyro
- Anthony Ríos
- Sophy
- Juan Félix
- César Flores
- Wellington Toribio
- Big Family
- Ingco Crew
- Divas by Jiménez

Recordings released or distributed under the Premium Latin name include Elvis Martínez's Todo se paga, Directo al corazón and Descontrolado; Negros' self-titled album, Sin fecha de vencimiento and Armadura de rosas; Wason Brazobán's Alma mía; Eddy Herrera's Paso firme and Viviendo al tiempo; Anthony Santos' Un muerto vivo; and Rita Indiana and Los Misterios' El juidero.

=== Corporate organization and relaunch ===
In 2015, several companies connected with the Premium Latin name were registered in the state of Florida, including Premium Latin Music Inc., Premium Latin Management Inc. and Premium Latin Publishing Inc. Corporate records identified Franklin M. Romero Jr. and other members of the Romero family as company officers.

The Florida companies were subsequently listed as inactive in the records of the Florida Division of Corporations.

In February 2018, the company announced a reorganization and the relaunch of its operations under the Premium Latin Company structure. The reorganized company was presented as having four principal divisions:

- Premium Latin Music, responsible for the production, release and distribution of recorded music;
- Premium Latin Publishing, responsible for music publishing and the administration of musical compositions;
- Premium Latin Management, responsible for artist management and representation;
- Premium Latin Films, responsible for film and audiovisual production.

At the time of the announcement, the company stated that its principal headquarters would be located in Santo Domingo, with additional operations in New York and Miami.

Premium Latin Company, LLC was registered in Florida in September 2018. The company was subsequently listed as inactive in Florida corporate records.

The corporate status of these entities does not, by itself, determine the status of the Premium Latin trademark, its recorded music catalogue or any distribution and licensing arrangements associated with the label.

== Film activities ==
Premium Latin expanded into film production through Premium Latin Films. The division was associated with the production of the Dominican films Sanky Panky, Santi Cló and Sanky Panky 2.

Sanky Panky, directed by José Enrique Pintor, received wide commercial exposure in the Dominican Republic and became the first installment in a film franchise.

The company's expansion into film formed part of a broader business strategy combining recorded music, artist management, music publishing, live-event production and audiovisual content.

== Influence ==
Premium Latin Music's historical significance is primarily associated with Aventura's international development. The combination of traditional bachata with elements of R&B, hip hop, pop and rock helped the genre reach a generation of Latino listeners who had been born or raised in the United States.

The success of “Obsesión” and We Broke the Rules expanded bachata beyond its traditional markets and helped popularize the style commonly described as urban bachata or New York bachata.

The subsequent international success of Aventura and Romeo Santos made the repertoire developed during the group's association with Premium Latin Music one of the most recognizable Latin tropical music catalogues of the early 21st century.

== Selected discography ==
=== Aventura ===
- Generation Next (1999)
- We Broke the Rules (2002)
- Love & Hate (2003)
- God's Project (2005)
- K.O.B. Live (2006)
- Kings of Bachata: Sold Out at Madison Square Garden (2007)
- The Last (2009)

=== Elvis Martínez ===
- Todo Se Paga
- Directo Al Corazón
- Descontrolado

=== Negros ===
- Negros
- Sin Fecha de Vencimiento
- Armadura de Rosas

=== Other releases ===
- Wason Brazobán - Alma mía
- Eddy Herrera — Paso firme
- Eddy Herrera — Viviendo al tiempo
- Anthony Santos — Un muerto vivo
- Rita Indiana and Los Misterios — El Juidero

== Related divisions ==
Division	Activity
Premium Latin Music	Production, release and distribution of recorded music
Premium Latin Publishing	Music publishing and administration of musical compositions
Premium Latin Management	Artist management and representation
Premium Latin Films	Film and audiovisual production

== See also ==
- Aventura (band)
- Romeo Santos
- Bachata
- Merengue music
- Music of the Dominican Republic
- Music industry
