= Sanky Panky 4: De Safari =

2025 Dominican comedy film

- Directed by: Elías Acosta
- Written by: Elías Acosta
- Produced by: Rafael Taveras; Esteban Martín
- Cinematography: Oliver Mota
- Production company: Premium Latin Films
- Distributed by: Caribbean Films Distribution
- Release date: May 15, 2025 (Dominican Republic)
- Running time: 114 minutes
- Country: Dominican Republic
- Language: Spanish
- Budget: RD$98.5 millions
- Box office: RD$27.2 million (Dominican Republic)

Sanky Panky 4: De Safari is a 2025 Dominican Republic comedy film directed and written by Elías Acosta. It is the fourth instalment in the Sanky Panky film series, which began in 2007. The film stars Fausto Mata, Aquiles Correa and Tony Pascual, reprising their roles as Genaro, Carlitos and Chelo, respectively. Massimo Borghetti and Franklin Romero Jr. also return to the cast.

The film was released theatrically in the Dominican Republic on 15 May 2025, following premiere events in San Francisco de Macorís, Santo Domingo and Santiago de los Caballeros.

== Plot ==
Genaro, Carlitos and Chelo work at a chocolate factory in San Francisco de Macorís. During an event organised for the employees, Carlitos wins a safari trip to Africa and chooses his two companions to travel with him.

After arriving in Nairobi, the group unexpectedly encounters Giuseppe, who is managing a hotel in the region. Their presence disrupts his plans and creates complications for the resort.

During a safari excursion, an incident involving a rhinoceros separates Genaro, Carlitos and Chelo in the savannah. Each man becomes involved with a different local community and is mistaken for a figure connected to its traditions. Rivalries among the groups threaten to escalate into a conflict over the region's natural resources.

Giuseppe and Goberto attempt to intervene but are also drawn into the crisis. The three friends eventually help broker an agreement among the communities. After returning to the Dominican Republic, they discover that the gifts they received during their journey contain gemstones and documents that unexpectedly transform their financial circumstances.

== Cast ==
- Fausto Mata as Genaro
- Aquiles Correa as Carlitos
- Tony Pascual as Chelo
- Massimo Borghetti as Giuseppe
- Franklin Romero Jr. as Goberto
- Suzette Reyes as Jazmín
- Toussaint Merionne as Bontu
- Remil Rodríguez as Chelo's assistant

== Production ==
Premium Latin Films formally announced the production in July 2024. Filming was planned in San Francisco de Macorís and San Juan de la Maguana in the Dominican Republic, as well as locations connected with Kenya. The principal production team included Elías Acosta as director, Rafael Taveras as general producer, Esteban Martín as producer and Nicole Quiñones as line producer.

During the film's release campaign, Diario Libre reported that landscapes in San Juan de la Maguana were used to recreate Kenyan settings. The film was shot by cinematographer Oliver Mota using an Alexa 35 camera.

The General Directorate of Cinema (Dominican Republic) approved a production budget of RD$98,567,573.38. Official documentation also recorded an executed budget of RD$69,897,506.00 and a validated investment of RD$10,000,000.00 by Pacific Assets Corp.

== Release ==
Sanky Panky 4: De Safari was released in cinemas across the Dominican Republic on 15 May 2025. Premiere events were held in San Francisco de Macorís, Santo Domingo and Santiago de los Caballeros.

The film received a limited theatrical release in the United States through Spanglish Movies in November 2025.

== Reception ==
In a review published by Acento, journalist José Rafael Sosa praised the recreation of African settings through locations in San Juan de la Maguana, Sharlyn Navarro's production design, Oliver Mota's cinematography and some of the visual effects. He also criticised elements of the screenplay, the direction of the cast and the sound mix.

According to figures from the General Directorate of Cinema cited by Acento, the film grossed RD$27.2 million and recorded 84,886 admissions in the Dominican Republic through November 2025. It ranked as the third-highest-grossing Dominican film during the period covered by the report.

== Accolades ==
The film was nominated for Comedy of the Year at the 2026 Soberano Awards. The official list of nominees credits Franklin Romero and Franklin Romero Jr. as producers.
