= Sanky Panky (film) =

2007 Dominican musical comedy film

- Directed by: José Enrique Pintor
- Written by: José Enrique Pintor; Juan Manuel Tejeda
- Produced by: Franklin Romero; Milbert Pérez; Helen Romero; Albert Nolasco; Ramona Nolasco
- Starring: Fausto Mata; Zdenka Kalina; Tony Pascual; Aquiles Correa; Nuryn Sanlley; Massimo Borghetti
- Cinematography: Elías Acosta
- Edited by: Lenny Borrello; Milbert Pérez
- Music by: Pachy Carrasco
- Production company: Premium Latin Films
- Distributed by: Producciones Coral
- Release date: 1 February 2007
- Running time: 111 minutes
- Country: Dominican Republic
- Languages: Spanish; English
- Budget: RD$9–20 million (reported)

Sanky Panky is a 2007 Dominican musical comedy film directed by José Enrique Pintor and starring Fausto Mata, Zdenka Kalina, Tony Pascual, Aquiles Correa, Nuryn Sanlley, Patricia Banks, Alina Vargas and Massimo Borghetti. Published sources attribute the film's writing to Pintor and also identify Dominican writer Juan Manuel Tejeda as having written the film or its screenplay.

The film follows Genaro (Mata), a financially struggling Dominican man who becomes convinced that marrying an American tourist is his best opportunity to leave the Dominican Republic and improve his economic situation. He travels to a resort in Bávaro and attempts to become a sanky-panky, a term used in the Dominican tourist industry for local men who pursue relationships with foreign tourists, often with economic or migratory aspirations.

The film became a major commercial success in the Dominican Republic. After five and a half weeks in cinemas, Listín Diario reported more than 515,000 admissions across more than 36 theatres, describing the figure as unprecedented at the time for a Dominican production in commercial cinemas. A 2025 retrospective reported that its original theatrical run lasted more than four months and attracted close to one million viewers, and ranked the film first among Dominican films in an inflation-adjusted box-office comparison.

Its success led to a film franchise beginning with Sanky Panky 2 (2013), followed by Sanky Panky 3 (2018) and Sanky Panky 4: De Safari (2025).

== Plot ==
Genaro is a young Dominican man living in Los Praditos (Santo Domingo) with his mother and helping to run the family's small neighbourhood grocery store. Frustrated by his financial situation and convinced that his prospects in the Dominican Republic are limited, he dreams of moving to the United States. He spends much of his free time trying to learn English, although his command of the language remains extremely poor.

His friends Chelo and Carlitos are initially amused by his ambitions, but Genaro becomes increasingly determined after visiting Miguelito, an acquaintance whose circumstances have improved dramatically through relationships with foreign women. Miguelito explains the lifestyle of men who pursue female tourists in the hope of receiving money, gifts or an opportunity to leave the country. Genaro concludes that finding a foreign woman willing to marry him may be his best chance of changing his life.

He contacts Giuseppe, an Italian acquaintance who works in management at a large resort in Bávaro. Although Giuseppe knows Genaro well enough to suspect his true intentions, he eventually helps him obtain temporary work at the hotel. Giuseppe repeatedly warns him that employees are forbidden from becoming romantically involved with guests and that violating hotel rules could cost both of them their jobs.

Once at the resort, Genaro becomes distracted by the large number of foreign tourists. His inability to speak English leads to a series of unsuccessful and embarrassing attempts to approach women, including misunderstandings with married guests. Nevertheless, he remains convinced that somewhere in the hotel he will find the woman who can provide him with the future he wants.

Among the newly arriving guests is Martha, an American tourist travelling with her older companions Dorothy and Helen. Martha has come to the Dominican Republic while experiencing serious problems in her romantic life. Although her relationship with her boyfriend has deteriorated, she has not completely resolved what she intends to do about it. Dorothy and Helen encourage her to stop dwelling on her problems and enjoy the vacation.

Genaro notices Martha and immediately sees her as the type of woman he has been searching for. Their first conversations are complicated by the fact that Genaro understands very little English and Martha speaks almost no Spanish. Genaro attempts to hide the extent of the problem, improvising phrases and pretending to understand conversations that frequently leave him completely confused.

The language barrier unexpectedly works in his favour. Martha, accustomed to feeling ignored or interrupted in her relationship at home, interprets Genaro's silence and constant attention as patience and sensitivity. Genaro, meanwhile, initially approaches her with the calculated hope that a relationship could eventually take him to the United States.

As they spend more time together, however, their interaction begins to change. Martha becomes amused by Genaro's awkward attempts to communicate, while he starts becoming genuinely interested in her rather than viewing her solely as a means of leaving the country. Their attraction grows during walks around the resort and a succession of vacation activities, including time at the beach and pool, scuba-diving lessons, water sports, horseback riding and excursions around the tourist area.

Genaro also asks Chelo and Carlitos to join him at the resort. His plan is partly practical: if his friends can entertain Dorothy and Helen, he will have more opportunities to be alone with Martha. Chelo and Carlitos enthusiastically accept and quickly become involved with the two older tourists, creating a parallel series of romantic and comic misunderstandings.

Their presence also complicates Genaro's attempt to conceal his real circumstances. Giuseppe becomes increasingly nervous that Genaro and his friends will cause trouble at the hotel, particularly as they involve themselves in parties, musical performances and the resort's entertainment programme. Chelo and Carlitos eventually participate in a musical performance, while Genaro continues trying to balance his duties as an employee with his courtship of Martha.

Despite the deception underlying their relationship, Martha and Genaro develop genuine affection for one another. Martha confides in him about her unhappiness, frequently without realizing that Genaro cannot fully understand what she is saying. Genaro nevertheless recognizes her emotional state and attempts to comfort her. What began as an opportunistic plan increasingly becomes a real romantic attachment.

Genaro eventually takes Martha beyond the controlled environment of the resort and introduces her to his own world. Along with Chelo, Carlitos, Dorothy and Helen, they travel to Santo Domingo, where Martha experiences Genaro's neighbourhood and meets his mother. Genaro's family and neighbours react excitedly to the arrival of the American visitors, particularly to the apparent possibility that Genaro has found an American girlfriend.

The trip exposes Martha to the enormous difference between Genaro's modest life and the luxury of the tourist resort. Rather than destroying their relationship, however, the experience brings them closer. Genaro also becomes more comfortable presenting Martha as someone he genuinely cares about rather than simply the foreign woman he originally hoped would solve his financial problems.

Their vacation culminates in an excursion to Altos de Chavón, where they attend an Aventura concert. Genaro's feelings for Martha become increasingly public, and the romantic fantasy he had created around their relationship appears, for a time, to be turning into reality.

Martha begins discussing the possibility of Genaro accompanying her to the United States. What Genaro originally regarded as an almost impossible dream now appears attainable. At the same time, the prospect forces him to confront the fact that his feelings for Martha have become more complicated than his original plan.

The situation changes abruptly when Martha's boyfriend unexpectedly arrives at the hotel. Genaro first learns about the man's presence through the hotel staff and initially hopes there has been a misunderstanding. He soon discovers that Martha's relationship at home has not ended as decisively as he believed.

The boyfriend confronts Martha about their relationship and the problems that led to her trip. Genaro secretly observes portions of their conversations despite understanding little of what is being said. Martha, meanwhile, challenges her boyfriend over the way he has treated her and makes clear that her experiences in the Dominican Republic have changed her perspective.

Genaro turns to Chelo, Carlitos and Giuseppe for help. His attempts to confront the situation produce further chaos at the hotel, including an altercation involving Martha's boyfriend and Giuseppe. Genaro nevertheless refuses simply to disappear, having become emotionally invested in Martha.

When Martha, her boyfriend, Genaro and the others finally come together, Martha accepts responsibility for the confusion she has created. She explains that Dorothy and Helen encouraged her to travel to the Dominican Republic partly to escape her relationship problems and that she allowed the situation with Genaro to develop without resolving her life at home.

She also acknowledges how important Genaro has become to her. Although their inability to understand one another produced countless misunderstandings, Martha tells him that he gave her something she had been missing: attention. Genaro listened to her, or at least appeared to, without constantly interrupting or dismissing her feelings. Their brief relationship therefore helped her understand what she expected from a partner.

Nevertheless, Martha concludes that the vacation cannot replace her real life. She decides to return home and attempt to resolve her relationship with her boyfriend rather than continue the romantic fantasy she has experienced with Genaro.

At the hotel reception, Chelo and Carlitos prepare to leave with Dorothy and Helen, excited by the possibility that their own relationships with the tourists may lead to further adventures abroad. Genaro initially refuses to go with them and remains preoccupied with Martha.

Martha completes her checkout and tells the hotel staff how much the vacation has meant to her. Her boyfriend waits nearby with their luggage. She acknowledges that she may have judged him unfairly and ultimately rejoins him. The two leave together, bringing Genaro's hopes of leaving the Dominican Republic with Martha to an end.

A sympathetic young woman who has observed Genaro throughout his pursuit of Martha attempts to console him. She reminds him that tourists often come to the resort looking for a temporary escape from their ordinary lives and that Genaro allowed himself to believe that the relationship necessarily meant something permanent.

Initially bitter, Genaro complains about everything he did for Martha and all the effort and money he invested in the relationship. As the conversation continues, however, his attention shifts toward the young woman beside him. She encourages him to move on, and the two begin flirting.

When she kisses him and offers to help him, Genaro immediately reveals that his ambitions have not disappeared entirely. Instead of asking for help reaching the United States, he asks her how he might obtain the money he needs for the down payment on a car. As the camera pulls away, Genaro begins enthusiastically explaining his latest plan, ending the film with his irrepressible desire to improve his circumstances intact.

== Cast ==
- Fausto Mata as Genaro
- Zdenka Kalina as Martha
- Tony Pascual as Chelo
- Aquiles Correa as Carlitos
- Nuryn Sanlley as Dorothy
- Patricia Banks as Helen
- Massimo Borghetti as Giuseppe
- Alina Vargas as La Joven
- Olga Bucarelli as Genaro's mother
- Miguel López as Martha's boyfriend
- El Jeffrey as Miguelito
- Franklin Romero Jr. as a hotel receptionist
- Wason Brazobán as himself

Members of the musical group Aventura also appear through concert footage incorporated into the film.

== Production ==
=== Development and writing ===
Sanky Panky was produced by Premium Latin Films and directed by José Enrique Pintor. Contemporary Dominican coverage regularly described Pintor as the film's writer-director, and the Cine dominicano en la mira catalogue credits him with the screenplay.

Other published sources also identify Juan Manuel Tejeda as a writer of the film. In 2011, Diario Libre described Tejeda as the writer who had "written the film Sanky Panky", while Hoy stated that Tejeda had written the screenplay of the film. Published databases have additionally associated Tejeda with the film's dialogue credit.

Contemporary reports gave differing production-cost figures. Diario Libre reported a cost of RD$9 million immediately before release, while executive producer Franklin Romero told Hoy that an initial budget of RD$8 million had eventually resulted in a total cost of approximately RD$20 million.

Diario Libre described the production before release as what appeared to be the Dominican Republic's first musical film and later referred to it as the country's first cinematic musical comedy. Pintor characterised the project primarily as entertainment rather than an attempt to redefine Dominican cinema.

=== Crew and technical production ===
The film was photographed in colour on 35 mm film. Elías Acosta served as director of photography, Ángel Dotel as art director, Eric Taveras handled sound and Pachy Carrasco composed and supervised the music. Editing was credited to Lenny Borrello and Milbert Pérez.

The producers listed in the Dominican film catalogue are Franklin Romero, Milbert Pérez, Helen Romero and Albert Nolasco. Contemporary promotional material also identified Milbert Pérez as general producer and Franklin Romero as executive producer.

The film was made before the implementation of the Dominican Republic's modern film-incentive legislation. Aquiles Correa later recalled that the limited production budget required scenes to be carefully planned and said Pintor gave the principal performers considerable freedom in developing their comedy.

=== Casting ===
The principal trio consisted of established comedian Fausto Mata as Genaro, Tony Pascual as Chelo and Aquiles Correa as Carlitos. Correa was not yet an established screen actor when the first film was made. A 2025 retrospective reported that several performers had been considered for Carlitos before Correa was tested for the role. Pascual reportedly encouraged him to stop consciously "acting" and behave more naturally, an approach that helped him secure the part.

The three central performers also contributed creatively beyond their acting roles. According to the same retrospective, the actors adapted lines and exchanged jokes between characters during the development of the films in order to preserve the comic rhythm and coherence of their characters.

Correa later described Sanky Panky as fundamental to his professional career and credited the combination of the screenplay, Pintor's direction and the existing popularity of Mata and Pascual with helping the first film connect with audiences.

=== Filming ===
Principal photography took place entirely in the Dominican Republic. Locations included the Hotel Barceló Bávaro, Casa de Campo, Altos de Chavón, the Colonial Zone of Santo Domingo and several neighbourhoods in the capital.

Production also used locations and roads between Santo Domingo and Bávaro. The resort setting became an important visual component of the story, contrasting the international tourist environment with Genaro's economic circumstances and neighbourhood life.

Footage of Aventura performing at Altos de Chavón was filmed and incorporated into the movie.

== Music ==
Music was an important component of Sanky Panky from the beginning of production. Pachy Carrasco was responsible for the film's music, while Chiqui Haddad worked on choreography.

Musical performers and groups associated with the film included Aventura, Grupo Negros, Big Family, El Jeffrey, Ingco Crew and Joaquín. Contemporary reports said the musical material incorporated Caribbean styles including merengue, bachata, reggaeton, son and bolero.

Two musical numbers from the film began receiving Dominican radio airplay several months before its theatrical release. "Pilón" was performed by Big Family, while "Morena" was performed by cast members Aquiles Correa and Tony Pascual. "Morena" was written by Iván C., arranged by Pachy Carrasco and accompanied on screen by more than ten dancers choreographed by Chiqui Haddad. Both tracks were prepared for a promotional CD connected with the film.

The soundtrack also featured "En un solo día", performed by Wason Brazobán and Grupo Negros. Brazobán later achieved wider international chart visibility as a recording artist.

== Themes and analysis ==
The film combines popular comedy and musical sequences with themes of migration, economic inequality, tourism and social mobility. The General Directorate of Cinema of the Dominican Republic has described Sanky Panky as one of the 2007 comedies that connected strongly with the local public, identifying Genaro's economic hardship and his decision to seek relationships with foreign tourists as central to the film's commercial and social premise.

Film researcher Félix Manuel Lora analysed Sanky Panky in the academic journal Ciencia y Sociedad as part of a broader study of migration and social criticism in Dominican fiction cinema. Lora argues that Genaro's decision to become a sanky-panky is motivated by the precarious economic circumstances faced by both him and his mother, linking the comedy directly to the pressures that encourage Dominican emigration.

Lora also observes that the film softens the conventional image of the sanky-panky by making Genaro an affable comic protagonist rather than treating him solely as a male sex worker. His pursuit of a foreign partner is therefore presented simultaneously as romantic comedy and as an attempted escape from economic deprivation.

The academic analysis further places Genaro's unsuccessful dream of emigrating within a wider tradition of Dominican films concerned with migration. The protagonist's dissatisfaction with local economic conditions becomes part of the film's comic language but also provides a social context for his actions.

Contemporary critic Armando Almánzar similarly compared Genaro's desire to leave the country with the aspiration depicted in Juan Luis Guerra's song "Visa para un sueño", noting that Genaro differs principally in the method he chooses: rather than attempting an illegal sea journey, he hopes to obtain his opportunity through a relationship with an American woman.

== Release ==
=== Theatrical release ===
Sanky Panky premiered theatrically in the Dominican Republic on 1 February 2007. The premiere followed an extensive domestic promotional campaign focusing on the film's comedy, music and popular television performers.

In May 2007, the film received a theatrical release in the United States, beginning with cinemas in New York and New Jersey serving large Dominican and Latino communities. The release included cinemas in Manhattan, Queens, Brooklyn and Newark.

=== Festivals and international exhibition ===
The film subsequently appeared in international Latin American and Ibero-American film events. Listín Diario reported that it participated in the second Latin American Film Festival in Oaxaca, the Chicago Latino Film Festival and an Ibero-American film festival in Vienna.

The film continued to circulate internationally after its original theatrical release. The Dominican General Directorate of Cinema stated in 2016 that the original Sanky Panky was still participating in international screenings and generating sales on different platforms nearly a decade after its premiere.

=== Home media and digital distribution ===
On 2 February 2011, Sanky Panky became available through iTunes for digital rental and purchase, with an English-subtitle option. At the time, Listín Diario referred to it as the highest-grossing film in the history of Dominican cinema.

== Reception ==
=== Box office ===
The film became an immediate commercial success in its home market. By 14 March 2007, after only five and a half weeks of exhibition, it had surpassed 515,000 admissions. Listín Diario reported that the film was playing in more than 36 cinemas and averaging approximately 100,000 spectators per week during that period.

The newspaper stated that no Dominican production had previously reached that attendance figure in commercial theatres at that stage of its run.

A 2025 Listín Diario retrospective reported that the original film ultimately remained in cinemas for more than four months and was seen by close to one million people. The same retrospective placed Sanky Panky at the top of a ranking of Dominican films adjusted for inflation, assigning it an inflation-adjusted gross of RD$187.5 million in the comparison.

Because contemporary reports provide differing production-cost figures and later box-office comparisons use inflation-adjusted values, the film's original nominal theatrical gross has been reported inconsistently.

=== Critical response ===
Critical reaction was mixed but included substantial praise for the film's comedy and technical execution.

Pachito Tejada of Listín Diario wrote shortly before the commercial release that the film met the expectations created around it. He praised its ability to maintain its comic tone and its mise-en-scène, while acknowledging that the central story itself was not particularly new.

Mario Núñez Muñoz of Diario Libre praised the situational humour, musical sequences and use of cultural and linguistic misunderstandings. He responded positively to the performances of Fausto Mata, Nuryn Sanlley, Tony Pascual and Aquiles Correa, and considered the photography and sound to be among the film's strongest technical achievements. He was more critical of aspects of the casting and considered the resolution of the central dramatic conflict insufficiently convincing.

Luis Beiro of Listín Diario later described Pintor as one of a group of Dominican filmmakers contributing to the developing national industry. While criticising weaknesses in the screenplay and some performances outside the tourist-resort portions of the film, he regarded Sanky Panky as a culturally significant entertainment work within the Dominican cinema of the period.

Other critics focused more heavily on the film's use of popular television-comedy conventions and musical-video aesthetics. Carlos Francisco Elías of Hoy interpreted the film as part of a recurring tendency in Dominican popular cinema to use television personalities, popular music and socially recognisable characters, while highlighting migration as its most distinctive social theme.

== Accolades ==
At the 2008 Casandra Awards, Sanky Panky received four nominations in the cinema categories.

2008 Casandra Award nominations
Category	Nominee	Result
Best Dominican Film	Sanky Panky	Nominated
Best Film Director	José Enrique Pintor	Nominated
Best Film Actor	Fausto Mata	Nominated
Best Film Actress	Zdenka Kalina	Nominated

== Legacy ==
The success of Sanky Panky established Genaro, Chelo and Carlitos as recurring characters in Dominican popular cinema and led to one of the country's longest-running film franchises.

The General Directorate of Cinema later cited Sanky Panky as a 2007 comedy that successfully connected with the local audience and demonstrated the commercial potential of Dominican popular cinema. In 2016, DGCINE described Sanky Panky as one of the country's most commercially successful film franchises and reported that the first two entries had been exhibited internationally in numerous territories, with versions dubbed or subtitled into other languages.

For Aquiles Correa, the original film represented a major turning point in his career. In a 2024 interview, he described his participation in the franchise as fundamental to his subsequent professional and economic success, and recalled particularly strong audience responses in Puerto Rico and Cuba.

The original cast trio of Fausto Mata, Tony Pascual and Aquiles Correa returned for Sanky Panky 2, released in 2013. A third instalment, Sanky Panky 3, followed in 2018.

A fourth film, Sanky Panky 4: De Safari, was released in the Dominican Republic on 15 May 2025, eighteen years after the original. A 2025 retrospective described the series as one of the most popular franchises in Dominican cinema and attributed its longevity to the chemistry of its three central characters, popular humour and recurring themes of aspiration and social mobility.

Film historian and critic Félix Manuel Lora has also discussed the series within the development of Dominican commercial cinema, particularly its use of Genaro as a character through whom migration, economic aspiration and popular Dominican identity are represented.

== See also ==
- Cinema of the Dominican Republic
- Sanky-panky
- Sanky Panky 2
- Sanky Panky 3
- Sanky Panky 4: De Safari
