= Carlota the Most Neighborhood-Like =

- Theatrical release poster
- Spanish: Carlota la más barrial
- Directed by: Yoel Morales
- Screenplay by: Carasaf Sánchez; Jaquem Quezada
- Based on: Carlota by Carasaf Sánchez
- Produced by: Victor Dume; Leidy Pena; Jalsen Santana
- Starring: Carasaf Sánchez
- Cinematography: Francis Adamez
- Edited by: Matteo Faccenda; Oscar Evelio Gutiérrez
- Music by: Francis Adamez
- Production companies: Dukesa Films; La Aldea Estudio
- Distributed by: Caribbean Film Distribution
- Release dates: August 25, 2025 (Santo Domingo); August 28, 2025 (Dominican Republic)
- Running time: 85 minutes
- Country: Dominican Republic
- Language: Spanish

Carlota the Most Neighborhood-Like (Spanish: Carlota la más barrial) is a 2025 Dominican crime action comedy film directed by Yoel Morales and written by Carasaf Sánchez and Jaquem Quezada. A follow-up film to the social media shorts featuring the character Carlota, created and performed by Sánchez. It follows Carlota who takes up arms with her neighborhood against a criminal gang that threatens them.

== Synopsis ==
Carlota, a unibrowed woman with a sharp tongue and a natural leadership-style, becomes the voice of her community in Villa Hermosa, a neighborhood in Santo Domingo, by confronting Fuca and his dangerous criminal gang.

== Cast ==
- Carasaf Sánchez as Carlota
- Vladimir Acevedo as Randy
- Fausto Mata as Fuca
- La Materialista as Sunsa
- La Perversa as Chula
- Manuel Raposo as La Tuti
- Ovandy Camilo as Father Lorenzo
- Aquiles Correa as Gundo
- José Cruz as Puñalá
- Diana Filpo as Pastora Molina
- Miguel Lendor as Pata Blanca
- Daniel Luciano as Mono
- Soraya María as Doña Anacuta
- Manuel Varet as Robert
- Ruairi Rhodes as American Soldier
- Leopoldo Severino as General
- Héctor Sierra as Don Quezada
- Ramón Tolentino as Himself
- Nany Flow
- José Miguel Fernández
- Vienna González
- Raymond Jaquez

== Production ==
Principal photography began on September 16, 2019, and wrapped in October 2019. The film was shot in Villa Hermosa and La Barquita. Due to the COVID-19 pandemic, post-production was halted, taking another two years to complete.

== Release ==
Carlota the Most Neighborhood-Like had its world premiere on August 25, 2025, at the Downtown Center in Santo Domingo, followed by a wide national theatrical release on August 28.

== Box office ==
The film held first place for three weeks after its theatrical release, becoming one of the highest-grossing Dominican films of the year.
