= Next to You (film) =

A tu lado
- Theatrical release poster
- Directed by: Martin Casapía Casanova
- Written by: Samuel del Amor
- Produced by: Jorge Olivas; Carlos Linares; Martín Casapía
- Starring: Alessandra Fuller; Andrés Vílchez
- Cinematography: Luis Alberto Cabrera
- Music by: Germán Tello
- Production company: Lfante Films
- Release date: March 1, 2018
- Running time: 89 minutes
- Country: Peru
- Language: Spanish

Next to You (Spanish: A tu lado) is a 2018 Peruvian romantic comedy film directed by Martin Casapía Casanova and written by Samuel del Amor. Starring Alessandra Fuller and Andrés Vílchez. It premiered on March 1, 2018 in Peruvian theaters.

== Synopsis ==
Paz, a young girl, immersed in her sadness, is invited to Punta Cana by her uncle Martín, who is a manager at one of the most prestigious hotels in the area, there she will meet Edú who works as a lifeguard at the hotel, this love story will take both characters on a hectic but fun journey.

== Cast ==
The actors participating in this film are:

- Alessandra Fuller as Paz
- Andrés Vílchez as Edú
- Jalsen Santana as Wilfredo
- Fausto Mata as Martín
- Joaquín Escobar as Percy
- Guillermo Castañeda
- Leslie Shaw
- Joaquín Escobar
- Cristian Rivero

== Production ==
=== Script ===
The idea for Next to You was conceived during a trip made by the director to Spain to promote Maligno. In brainstorming, the story was constructed as a drama film, but through film assistance it came to be conceived as a romantic comedy.

=== Filming ===
Principal photography lasted 5 weeks in Punta Cana, Dominican Republic.

== Reception ==
Next to You was seen by 226,360 viewers throughout its run in Peruvian theaters, becoming the tenth highest-grossing national film of 2018.

== Awards ==
Year	Award	Category	Recipient	Result	Ref.
2018	Los Angeles Film Awards	Best Comedy Feature	Next to You	Won	
