= Detective Willy =

- film poster
- Directed by: José María Cabral
- Written by: Penélope Adames; José María Cabral
- Produced by: José María Cabral; Kendy Yanoreth
- Starring: Fausto Mata; Denise Quiñones; Anthony Alvarez; Crystal Jimenez Vicens
- Cinematography: Hernan Herrera
- Edited by: José María Cabral
- Music by: Rita Indiana
- Release date: June 25, 2015 (Dominican Republic)
- Running time: 97 minutes
- Country: Dominican Republic
- Language: Spanish

Detective Willy is a 2015 Dominican adventure comedy film directed by Jose Maria Cabral. The film opens in the Dominican Republic and Puerto Rico in the summer of 2015. It features performances by Fausto Mata, Denise Quiñones, Anthony Alvarez, Crystal Jimenez, Hector Anibal, Kenny Grullón, Manuel Chapuseaux, Christian Alvarez, Josue Guerrero, Patricia Ascuasiati and others. The film premiered June 25, 2015.

== Synopsis ==
Willy Echevarria (Fausto Mata) is a policeman in a small town in the Dominican Republic. He's also a fan of and yearns to be like the leads of classic film noir. After being fired in a bumbled operation with his bad cop partner Bruce Garcia (Anthony Alvarez), Willy has a chance to restore his career by finding a historical artifact that mysteriously went missing from a national museum.

== Cast ==
- Fausto Mata as Willy Echevarria
- Denise Quiñones as Ela Rayuela
- Anthony Alvarez as Bruce Garcia
- Crystal Jimenez Vicens as Jael Diaz
- Hector Anibal
- Kenny Grullón
- Manuel Chapuseaux
- Christian Alvarez
- Patricia Ascuasiati
- Josue Guerrero
- Endry Sckely
