= La Materialista =

Dominican singer

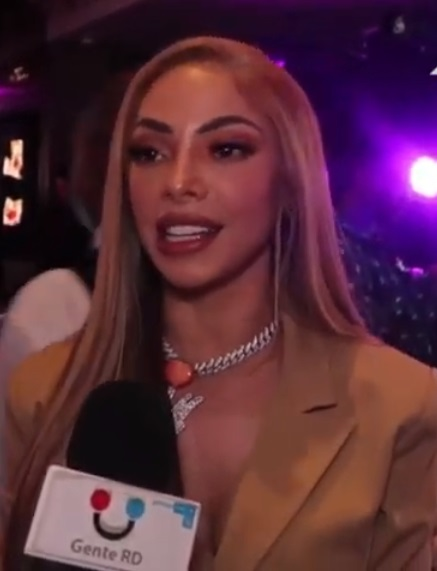
- La Materialista in 2022

Background information
- Also known as: La Reina Urbana Callejera
- Born: Yameiry Josefina Infante Honoret; March 19, 1985 (age 41)
- Origin: Santiago de los Caballeros, Dominican Republic
- Genres: Reggaeton; hip hop; bachata; pop rap
- Occupations: Singer; rapper; actress
- Instrument: Vocals
- Years active: 2004–present
- Labels: Rompiendo Récords; Venemusic; Universal Music Group
- Spouse: Eury Matos(2023-present)
- Website: lamaterialistaoficial.com

Yameiry Josefina Infante Honoret (born March 19, 1985), known in show business as La Materialista, is a Dominican singer, rapper, actress and vedette.

In 2011, she was elected by Luz García's Noche de Luz programme as a "Summer's Hot Body".

La Materialista was the leading female exponent of the Dominican urban music in the early 2000s, winning the Q Award for "Best Urban Artist" (2012) and "Best Video Clip" (2013); she has also been nominated for the Soberano Award on several occasions as "Best New Artist" and "Urban Group of the Year".

In 2013, she became the first Dominican female artist to perform at Miss Venezuela.

== Plagiarism allegations ==
In 2013, Honoret was accused of plagiarising the Korean girl group 2NE1's song "I Am the Best" with her newly released track "Chipi Cha Cha". The music video was removed from YouTube after extensive allegations in the comments, and it was re-uploaded in 2015 as a cover.

Honoret responded to the allegations, saying, "Sorry, I didn't think you would feel bad for me it was an honor making a cover of the song with my lyrics."

== Personal life ==
She married music manager Eury Matos in 2023. That same year her brother passed away. In 2025 she gave birth to her daughter Emery. She released a song in her honour, "Llegaste Tu".

== Discography ==
=== Studio albums ===
- A Otro Nivel

== Filmography ==
Year	Title	Role	Notes
2012	Lotoman 2.0	Cameo appearance	
2013	Biodegradable	Perla	
2014	Lotoman 003	Nicole	Film released on March 27, 2014.
2014	La Diabla en Ruedas	Diana	
2023	La casa de los famosos	Herself	Houseguest; 4th place
2025	Carlota the Most Neighborhood-Like	Sunsa	
