= Wason Brazobán =

Dominican musician

- Also known as: Wason
- Born: Villa Mella, Santo Domingo, Dominican Republic
- Genres: Bachata, Latin pop
- Occupations: Musician, songwriter
- Instrument: Vocals
- Years active: 2001 – present
- Label: Independent

Wason Brazobán is a Dominican musician and songwriter, originally from Villa Mella, a sector north of Santo Domingo.

== Charts ==
Brazobán has scored tropical airplay hits for his band as well as for stars such as Monchy & Alexandra, Hector Acosta and Domenic Marte. But Negros' pop single "En Un Sólo Día" is his group's first entry on the Hot Latin Songs chart, where it reached No. 47, it was include on the original soundtrack for the Dominican blockbuster film Sanky Panky on 2007 and cover it by the Colombian Latin pop rock band Morat for his album Sobre el amor y sus efectos secundarios, certificated Gold (Latin) by RIAA on 2016.

== Discography ==
- Alma Mía (2010)
