= Massimo Borghetti =

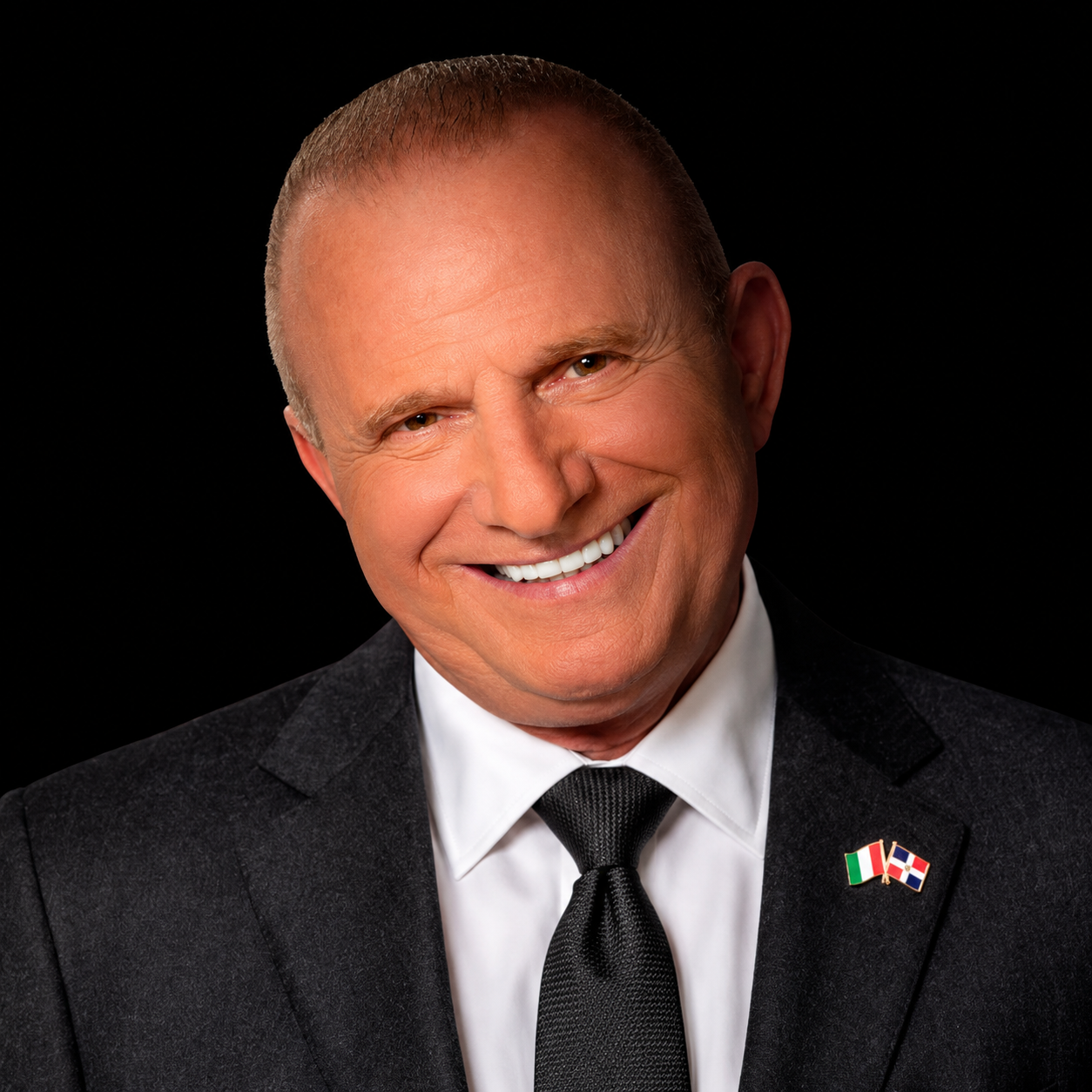
- Borghetti in 2026
- Occupations: Television presenter, radio host, actor and gastronomy communicator
- Years active: 1974–present
- Known for: Canta Italia, Ciao Italia, El Ático, Saber del Sabor and the Sanky Panky film series

Massimo Borghetti is an Italian television presenter, radio host, actor and gastronomy communicator who has worked primarily in the Dominican Republic. He is known for the radio programme Canta Italia, the television programmes Ciao Italia, El Ático and Saber del Sabor, and his portrayal of Giuseppe in the Dominican comedy-film franchise Sanky Panky.

== Career ==
In a 2011 interview with El Caribe, Borghetti said that he began working in media in Italy in 1974, initially in radio and later in television. He moved to the Dominican Republic in 1987.

In 2002, he launched the radio programme Canta Italia on Studio Rock. The programme was subsequently broadcast by several Dominican radio stations, including La Voz de las Fuerzas Armadas, Quisqueya FM, Neón, CDN La Radio and Súper 7. Its format combined Italian songs with commentary about their history and explanations in Spanish of their lyrics. In 2004, he was credited as the producer and host of Canta Italia and the television programme Ciao Italia TV.

In 2005, Borghetti created and co-hosted the television programme El Ático with Neapolitan chef Ciro Casola. Broadcast on CDN Canal 37, the programme combined gastronomy, interviews, humour and cultural content. In 2013, El Ático moved from CDN to Telecentro Canal 13 and Coral 39. The programme also developed cooking-competition segments, including Chefissimo and Chef Mate's.

In 2018, Borghetti returned to CDN Canal 37 with Saber del Sabor, a daily gastronomy programme that presented an ingredient, a cooking technique and a related culinary history in each episode. He co-hosted the programme with María Kelly. In 2023, El Caribe and CDN reported that the programme had reached its eighteenth anniversary, tracing its origins to the launch of El Ático in 2005.

== Acting career ==
Borghetti portrayed the hotel manager Giuseppe in Sanky Panky (2007) and Sanky Panky 2 (2013). He also appeared in the short film Quebranto (2015).

In 2024, Diario Libre and El Caribe reported that Borghetti would reprise the role of Giuseppe in Sanky Panky 4: De Safari. The film was released in the Dominican Republic in May 2025.

== Selected filmography ==
Year	Title	Role	Notes
2007	Sanky Panky	Giuseppe	Feature film
2013	Sanky Panky 2: Objetivo Italia	Giuseppe	Feature film
2015	Quebranto	Teacher	Short film
2025	Sanky Panky 4: de Safari	Giuseppe	Feature film

== Selected television and radio programmes ==
Year	Programme	Medium	Role
2002	Canta Italia	Radio	Creator, producer and host
2004	Ciao Italia TV	Television	Producer and host
2005	El Ático	Television	Creator, executive producer and host
2018	Saber del Sabor	Television	Host
