= Ovni (film) =

- Theatrical release poster
- Directed by: Raúl Marchand Sánchez
- Written by: Raúl Marchand Sánchez
- Produced by: José Miguel Bonetti; Eduardo Najri; Jochi Vicente
- Starring: Tony Pascual; Christian Álvarez
- Cinematography: Jaime Costas
- Edited by: Raúl Marchand Sánchez
- Music by: Geronimo Mercado
- Production company: Bonter Media
- Distributed by: Caribbean Films Distribution
- Release dates: October 20, 2016 (PRHF); May 18, 2017 (Dominican Republic)
- Running time: 93 minutes
- Country: Dominican Republic
- Language: Spanish

Ovni is a 2016 Dominican science fiction comedy film written and directed by Raúl Marchand Sánchez. Starring Tony Pascual and Christian Álvarez.

== Synopsis ==
A humanoid alien named Uno arrives on Earth in a UFO (OVNI) in the mountains of the Dominican Republic on a mission to prevent an alien invasion. Uno encounters a former Air Force pilot name Cosmos, who mistakenly believes he is his cousin from long ago due to Uno's power to shapeshift. A series of comical events occur as Uno interacts with humans and the Dominican Air Force.

== Cast ==
The actors participating in this film are:

- Tony Pascual as Constantino 'Cosmo' Robles
- Christian Álvarez as "Uno"
- Fausto Rojas as Obie
- Luis del Valle as Commander Martinez
- Pericles Mejía as Chenqui
- Brian Payano Parra as Nico
- Irina Pérez Herrera as Doña Luz
- Yaritza Reyes as "Dos"
- Cecile van Welie as Aurora
- Carasaf Sánchez as Agent 1 'Marco'

== Production ==
Principal photography lasted five weeks in Jarabacoa and Constanza.

== Release ==
Ovni had its world premiere on October 20, 2016, at the Puerto Rico Horror Fest. Its commercial premiere was planned for June 1, 2017 in Dominican theaters, but it was brought forward to May 18, 2017.

== Accolades ==
Year	Award	Category	Recipient	Result	Ref.
2017	Madrid International Film Festival	Best Supporting Actor in a Foreign Film	Luis del Valle	Nominated	
2018	Soberano Awards	Comedy of the year	José Miguel Bonetti, Eduardo Najri & Jochy Vicente	Nominated	
2018	La Silla Awards	Best Comedy	Raúl Marchand Sánchez	Nominated	
2018	La Silla Awards	Best Editing	Raúl Marchand Sánchez	Nominated	
2018	La Silla Awards	Best Production Design	Adria Victoria	Nominated	
2018	La Silla Awards	Best Costume	Carolina Liberato	Nominated	
2018	La Silla Awards	Best Special Effects	Jaime Castillo	Nominated	
