= Cinema of the Dominican Republic =

The cinema of the Dominican Republic comprises the production, distribution, exhibition, preservation and study of films associated with the Dominican Republic, as well as the country's development as a filming location for domestic and international audiovisual productions.

The earliest documented public film screening in the Dominican Republic took place on 27 August 1900 at the Curiel Theatre in Puerto Plata, when the merchant Francesco Grecco presented a cinématographe developed by the Lumière brothers. The first Dominican fiction film was La leyenda de la Virgen de la Altagracia, filmed in 1922 by Francisco Palau, Tuto Báez and Juan B. Alfonseca and released on 16 February 1923.

Film production remained intermittent for much of the twentieth century. A more consistent domestic industry began to emerge during the 1990s and early 2000s, particularly after the commercial success of Nueba Yol: por fin llegó Balbuena (1995) and Perico ripiao (2003). The latter year has been described by the General Directorate of Cinema (DGCINE) as the "Year Zero" of contemporary Dominican film production because it marked the beginning of a sustained output of fiction films.

The enactment of Law No. 108-10 for the Promotion of Cinematographic Activity in 2010 reshaped the sector by establishing fiscal incentives, creating an institutional framework for the industry and encouraging domestic and foreign audiovisual productions to film in the country. Since the 2010s, Dominican cinema has expanded commercially while also gaining greater international visibility through films such as Bantú Mama, Pepe, Sugar Island and Olivia & Las Nubes.

== History ==
=== Introduction of cinema and silent-era production (1900–1924) ===
Cinema arrived in the Dominican Republic on 27 August 1900, when the Curiel Theatre in Puerto Plata hosted an exhibition of the Lumière brothers' cinématographe. The screening was organized by Francesco Grecco, a merchant who travelled across the Caribbean presenting the new technology.

In 1915, Puerto Rican cameraman Rafael Colorado filmed Excursión de José de Diego en Santo Domingo, regarded as the earliest known film shot in Dominican territory by a foreign filmmaker.

The origins of domestic fiction filmmaking are generally traced to photographer and editor Francisco Palau. In 1922, Palau worked with photographer Tuto Báez and Juan B. Alfonseca on La leyenda de la Virgen de la Altagracia. Based on texts by historian Bernardo Pichardo, the film premiered on 16 February 1923 and is widely regarded as the first Dominican fiction film.

The same creative team later made Las emboscadas de Cupido, a comedy released on 19 March 1924. It told the story of a couple attempting to remain together despite opposition from the woman's father.

=== Trujillo dictatorship and documentary cinema (1930–1961) ===
The dictatorship of Rafael Trujillo, which lasted from 1930 until his assassination in 1961, severely restricted freedom of expression and limited the development of an independent film culture. During this period, documentary films, newsreels and official recordings became the dominant forms of audiovisual production, often serving propagandistic purposes.

The earliest Dominican sound film is generally identified as a 1930 newsreel concerning Trujillo's inauguration. In 1953, filmmaker Rafael Augusto Sánchez Sanlley, known as Pupito, produced thirteen documentaries commissioned by government ministries through the company Cinema Dominicana. According to DGCINE's historical account, some of the footage revealed the contrast between the material hardship experienced by part of the Dominican population and the wealth displayed by the Trujillo family. Sánchez Sanlley was subsequently imprisoned and the company was dismantled.

In 1958, Manuel Báez made Ganadería: riqueza nacional, regarded as the first Dominican documentary filmed in 35 mm and in colour. After Trujillo's assassination, Hugo Mateo began work on 30 de mayo: gesta libertadora, a documentary incorporating archival material related to the end of the dictatorship.

=== Post-dictatorship cinema and documentary development (1963–1989) ===
In 1963, playwright Franklin Domínguez released La silla, the first Dominican feature film made after the fall of the Trujillo regime. Starring Camilo Carrau as its only performer, the film examined political repression and the moral dilemmas faced by young Dominicans under the dictatorship.

Documentary cinema acquired particular importance during the 1960s, 1970s and 1980s. Filmmakers associated with this period included Max Pou, Jimmy Sierra, José Bujosa Mieses, Onofre de la Rosa, Claudio Chea, Agliberto Meléndez, Félix Germán, Peyi Guzmán and José Luis Sáez.

Among the documentary films produced during these decades were El esfuerzo de un pueblo (1968), Carnaval (1969), Santo Domingo: cuna de América (1970), Siete días con el pueblo (1978), Camino al Pico Duarte (1982) and A golpe de heroísmo (1985).

From 1988 onwards, René Fortunato developed a body of documentary work focused on Dominican political history. His films include Abril: la trinchera del honor (1988), the trilogy El poder del jefe (1991–1996), La herencia del tirano (1998), La violencia del poder (2003) and Bosch: presidente en la frontera imperial (2009).

A major milestone in Dominican fiction cinema was Agliberto Meléndez's Un pasaje de ida (1988). Based on the deaths of Dominican migrants who suffocated inside a container aboard the Regina Express, the film received awards at the Huelva Ibero-American Film Festival and the Havana Film Festival. It is commonly regarded as one of the most representative works in the history of Dominican cinema.

=== Commercial expansion and sustained production (1990–2009) ===
Dominican cinema began to develop broader commercial strategies during the 1990s. Ángel Muñiz's Nueba Yol: por fin llegó Balbuena (1995), starring Luisito Martí as the television character Balbuena, was a significant box-office success. Its promotional campaign used newspapers, radio, television and direct advertising on a scale not previously associated with a Dominican film.

The film was followed by Nueba Yol III: bajo la nueva ley (1997). That same year, Pericles Mejía released Cuatro hombres y un ataúd, a comedy informed by the director's professional experience in advertising.

DGCINE identifies 2003 as the "Year Zero" of contemporary Dominican filmmaking because it marked the beginning of a consistent pattern of fiction-film production. That year included the release of Miguel Vásquez's Éxito por intercambio and Ángel Muñiz's Perico ripiao.

Perico ripiao became one of the defining commercial successes of the local industry. During the remainder of the decade, Dominican films increasingly explored comedy, drama, thriller, horror and social criticism. Notable releases included Negocios son negocios (2004), Andrea (2005), Viajeros (2006), Sanky Panky (2007), Yuniol (2007), Ladrones a domicilio (2008), La soga (2009) and Cristiano de la secreta (2009).

=== Film Law and industrial transformation (2010–present) ===
Law No. 108-10 for the Promotion of Cinematographic Activity was enacted in 2010. It established mechanisms designed to encourage the creation, production, distribution, exhibition, preservation and dissemination of films, as well as domestic and foreign investment in the audiovisual sector.

The law created the General Directorate of Cinema and the Intersectoral Council for the Promotion of Cinematographic Activity in the Dominican Republic (Spanish: Consejo Intersectorial para la Promoción de la Actividad Cinematográfica en la República Dominicana; CIPAC). DGCINE began operating on 13 June 2011, succeeding the National Directorate of Cinema (Spanish: Dirección Nacional de Cine; DINAC).

In 2011, Jorge and Luis Morillo released 3 al rescate, the first Dominican animated feature film. In 2012, Fernando Báez Mella's El rey de Najayo became the first Dominican film to benefit from the new legal framework.

The implementation of Law No. 108-10 contributed to an increase in the number of domestic releases, the professionalization of technical crews and the arrival of foreign productions. It also expanded the country's audiovisual infrastructure and its visibility as a Caribbean filming destination.

== Film industry ==
=== Institutional framework and incentives ===
DGCINE is the government agency responsible for coordinating and regulating public policy related to cinematographic and audiovisual activities. It is attached to the Dominican Ministry of Culture and also operates internationally as the Dominican Republic Film Commission.

Law No. 108-10 created complementary incentives for domestic and foreign production. Article 34 is intended to encourage investment in Dominican feature films. Article 39 establishes a transferable tax credit for qualifying national and international audiovisual productions that incur eligible expenditure in Dominican territory.

According to DGCINE, by the fifteenth anniversary of the legislation in 2025, more than 5,600 individuals and companies had been registered in the sector, 134 projects had received support through the public FONPROCINE competition and more than 150 potential filming locations had been included in the official location database.

The same institutional report stated that international studios and platforms including Netflix, Amazon Studios, Disney, Paramount and Universal had filmed in the country, and that Dominican companies had participated in co-productions with more than twenty countries.

=== Production, employment and economic impact ===
The Dominican audiovisual sector includes domestic films, foreign shoots, television series, miniseries, documentaries, short films, music videos, commercials and reality television programmes.

An economic-impact report published in 2023 stated that the country had developed an audiovisual ecosystem that included five filming studios, ten boutique post-production and animation facilities, specialized international service providers and a trained local crew base. The report highlighted the presence of Pinewood Dominican Republic Studios, which includes a horizon water tank designed for aquatic filming.

The report estimated that audiovisual filming generated more than 25,000 jobs in 2022 and produced an economic contribution equivalent to approximately 0.32 per cent of the country's gross domestic product, or RD$18.6 billion in additional economic activity. It also stated that women occupied approximately 55 per cent of the jobs associated with filming and that micro and small enterprises represented approximately 88 per cent of industry suppliers.

In 2023, DGCINE reported 120 audiovisual productions: 75 domestic and 45 foreign. The agency estimated their economic contribution at RD$10.197 billion.

=== Filming locations and international productions ===
The Dominican Republic has attracted productions through a combination of fiscal incentives, tropical and urban locations, studio infrastructure, trained crews and proximity to the United States. Filming has expanded beyond Santo Domingo, Boca Chica and Juan Dolio to locations in Samaná, Puerto Plata, La Romana, Punta Cana, La Vega and Santiago.

Scenes from international films including The Godfather Part II, Apocalypse Now, Jurassic Park and The Good Shepherd were filmed in the Dominican Republic.

In 2023, the Film Friendly Samaná initiative developed by the Dominican Republic Film Commission received the Emerging Location Award at the Global Production Awards. The initiative was recognized for the growth in audiovisual production, services, infrastructure, specialized crews and filming-location options available in Samaná.

=== Domestic theatrical exhibition ===
The number of audiovisual productions filmed or approved in the Dominican Republic should be distinguished from the number of Dominican feature films released commercially in cinemas and from the attendance generated by those releases.

According to a statistical series published by Acento using figures from the National Statistics Office and DGCINE, 256 local feature films were released in Dominican cinemas between 2014 and 2024. Together, they attracted approximately 9.4 million admissions and generated RD$2.017 billion in ticket sales.

Annual output ranged from 9 releases in 2020, when cinema exhibition was disrupted by the COVID-19 pandemic, to 38 releases in 2025. The strongest years in terms of admissions during the 2014–2025 period were 2015, with 1,593,421 admissions, and 2018, with 1,466,693. In revenue terms, 2018 produced the highest gross, with RD$326.6 million.

In 2025, Dominican films drew 587,943 admissions and generated RD$188.9 million in ticket sales. This total included four films released in 2024 that remained in cinemas during the following year. The 38 films released specifically in 2025 generated RD$142.5 million.

In 2025, Dominican productions accounted for 19.3 per cent of total cinema attendance in the country. Los Rechazados, El Heredero and Medias Hermanas ranked among the ten most-watched films in Dominican cinemas that year.

Although the annual number of releases increased substantially over the period, box-office performance did not always grow at the same rate, indicating that a higher volume of productions did not automatically translate into higher admissions for Dominican films.

In 2025, Dominican films accounted for 19.3 per cent of total cinema attendance in the country. Los Rechazados, directed by Yasser Michelen; El Heredero, directed by Frank Perozo; and Medias Hermanas, directed by Yoel Morales, ranked among the ten most-watched films in Dominican cinemas that year.

== International profile and recognition ==
Dominican cinema expanded its presence in international festivals, co-production forums and distribution channels during the 2010s and 2020s. This development included commercial productions, documentaries, animation and auteur cinema.

In 2023, Bantú Mama, directed by Iván Herrera, won the NAACP Image Award for Outstanding International Motion Picture. The award marked the first time that a Dominican production received the distinction.

In 2024, Pepe, directed by Nelson Carlos De Los Santos Arias, competed at the 74th Berlin International Film Festival. De Los Santos Arias received the Silver Bear for Best Director.

In 2026, Olivia & Las Nubes, written and directed by Tomás Pichardo Espaillat, won the Platino Award for Best Animated Film. It became the first Dominican production to win a Platino Award.

Other Dominican films with significant international circulation include Cocote, directed by Nelson Carlos De Los Santos Arias; Carpinteros, directed by José María Cabral; La bachata de Biónico, directed by Yoel Morales; and Sugar Island, directed by Johanné Gómez Terrero.

== Institutions and preservation ==
=== General Directorate of Cinema ===
The General Directorate of Cinema administers public policy concerning cinematographic activity, the incentive system established under Law No. 108-10, the registration of industry professionals and companies, and programmes supporting production, training and international promotion. It also serves as the technical and logistical secretariat of CIPAC.

The Film Promotion Fund (Spanish: Fondo para la Promoción Cinematográfica; FONPROCINE) supports Dominican film projects through public calls covering stages such as screenwriting, development, production and post-production. According to DGCINE, 134 projects had received support through the programme by 2025.

=== Dominican Cinematheque ===
The Dominican Cinematheque (Spanish: Cinemateca Dominicana) is a dependency of DGCINE responsible for rescuing, preserving, cataloguing, exhibiting and disseminating Dominican and international audiovisual heritage.

The institution was inaugurated as the National Cinematheque on 16 November 1979 through the work of Agliberto Meléndez, Omar Narpier and Adelso Cass. It closed on 18 November 1987 and reopened on 16 March 2002. In August 2004, it adopted the name Cinemateca Dominicana.

In 2005, the Cinematheque became affiliated with the International Federation of Film Archives (FIAF).

After the enactment of Law No. 108-10, the Cinematheque became a dependency of DGCINE. In 2015, public institutions and representatives of the film sector signed the Pact for the Preservation of Dominican Audiovisual Heritage. In 2017, a preservation vault was constructed for a collection containing more than 40,000 audiovisual items.

Renovation work began in 2018. The institution reopened its exhibition gallery and Sala B to the public in 2022. Its outreach activities include Cinemateca sobre Ruedas (literally, Cinematheque on Wheels), a travelling programme that organizes screenings in different parts of the country.

=== Professional associations and awards ===
The Dominican Association of Film Industry Professionals (Spanish: Asociación Dominicana de Profesionales de la Industria del Cine; ADOCINE) represents professionals working in the sector and organizes the La Silla Awards. The awards recognize Dominican films and film professionals.

The name of the awards refers to La silla (1963), Franklin Domínguez's film about political repression during the Trujillo dictatorship.

== Festivals and markets ==
The Santo Domingo Global Film Festival, also known as the Dominican Global Film Festival, is one of the country's principal international film events. Its programme has included feature films, documentaries, short films, tributes, panels, workshops and activities related to co-production and professional development.

In 2017, the festival received accreditation from the International Federation of Film Producers Associations (FIAPF) as a competitive feature-film festival specializing in first films. The accreditation made it the first Caribbean festival to receive that distinction.

The Dominican Republic also hosts festivals and showcases dedicated to domestic cinema, international films, documentaries, environmental themes, short films and independent production.

The Dominican Film Market was established in Santo Domingo as an industry event intended to support professional exchange, distribution and co-production opportunities in the Caribbean audiovisual sector.

== Challenges and debates ==
The expansion of Dominican film production has generated debate about screenwriting, genre diversity, technical training, distribution, access to cinemas and the long-term commercial sustainability of domestic releases.

Box-office data between 2014 and 2025 indicates that an increase in the number of domestic releases does not automatically produce higher attendance. Some years with fewer releases generated stronger commercial results than years with a larger number of titles.

A 2026 analysis published by Acento reported that the geographical concentration of movie theatres limits access for a substantial portion of the population. The same article cited audience concerns including an excessive concentration of comedies, the recurrent casting of the same performers, repetitive narratives and insufficiently engaging screenplays.

Distribution remains a particular challenge for documentaries and auteur films, whose circulation may depend more heavily on festivals, cultural venues, streaming platforms and institutional support than on extended theatrical runs.

== See also ==
- List of Dominican Republic films
- General Directorate of Cinema (Dominican Republic)
- Dominican Film Market
- Culture of the Dominican Republic
