= General Directorate of Cinema (Dominican Republic) =

Dominican government agency responsible for cinema and audiovisual policy

- Dirección General de Cine
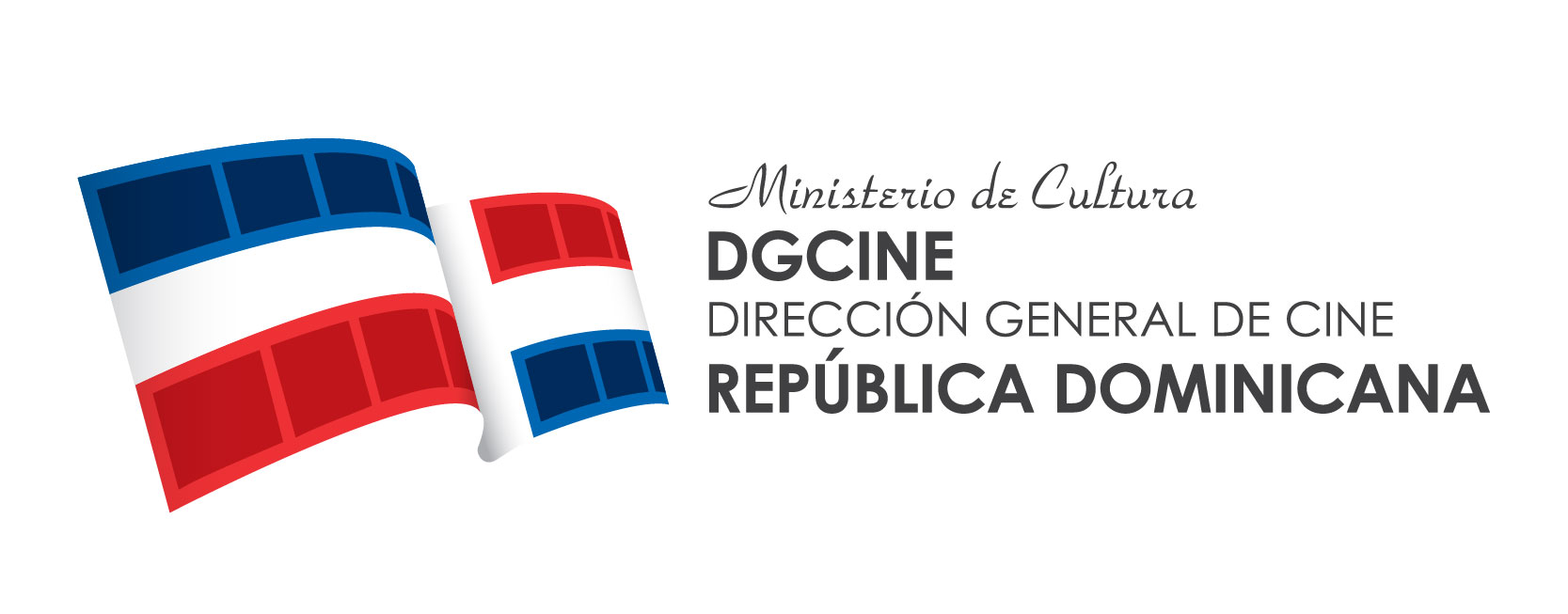
- Official logo

Agency overview
- Formed: 13 June 2011; 14 years ago
- Preceding Agency: National Directorate of Cinema (DINAC)
- Type: Film commission and cinema authority
- Jurisdiction: Dominican Republic
- Headquarters: Calle Socorro Sánchez No. 152, Gascue, Santo Domingo, Dominican Republic
- Agency executive: Marianna Vargas Gurilieva, Director general
- Parent Ministry: Ministry of Culture
- Website: dgcine.gob.do

The General Directorate of Cinema (Spanish: Dirección General de Cine; DGCINE), also presented internationally as the Dominican Republic Film Commission, is a decentralized government agency responsible for cinema and audiovisual policy in the Dominican Republic. It is attached to the Ministry of Culture and has legal personality as well as administrative, financial and technical autonomy.

DGCINE was established under Law No. 108-10 for the Promotion of Cinematographic Activity. Its responsibilities include promoting the development of the national film industry, administering fiscal incentives, regulating cinematographic activities, maintaining the national film registry and supporting the positioning of the country as a destination for foreign audiovisual productions.

== History ==
The institutional framework governing cinematographic activity in the Dominican Republic was established by Law No. 108-10 for the Promotion of Cinematographic Activity, enacted in 2010. The law was partially amended later that year by Law No. 257-10. Its implementing regulations were established by Decree No. 370-11.

Before DGCINE was created, cinematographic policy was administered through the National Directorate of Cinema (Spanish: Dirección Nacional de Cine; DINAC), which had been established by Resolution No. 1-04 of the National Council of Culture in 2004.

DGCINE began operating on 13 June 2011 under its first director general, Ellis Pérez. In January 2014, President Danilo Medina appointed Yvette Marichal as director general under Decree No. 388-13. Pérez subsequently became a film adviser to the executive branch.

President Luis Abinader appointed Marianna Vargas Gurilieva as director general under Decree No. 21-21 in 2021, replacing Marichal. Vargas Gurilieva is a lawyer who participated in the preparation, revision and amendment of the Dominican film law and its implementing regulations.

== Legal framework and responsibilities ==
DGCINE administers the policies and mechanisms created under Law No. 108-10 and its subsequent amendments. The law seeks to promote the progressive development of Dominican cinematography, stimulate local and foreign investment, facilitate audiovisual production and preserve the country's film heritage.

The agency also serves as the technical and logistical secretariat of the Intersectoral Council for the Promotion of Cinematographic Activity in the Dominican Republic (Spanish: Consejo Intersectorial para la Promoción de la Actividad Cinematográfica en la República Dominicana; CIPAC).

=== CIPAC ===
CIPAC is the intersectoral council responsible for decisions concerning the development of Dominican cinematography. It consists of eleven representatives from the public and private sectors and is required to meet at least once a year.

Its responsibilities include approving programmes and projects submitted to DGCINE, allocating resources from the Film Promotion Fund (Spanish: Fondo para la Promoción Cinematográfica; 'FONPROCINE), and establishing the annual conditions, limits, modalities and expenditure categories applicable to grants awarded through the fund.

CIPAC also issues regulatory resolutions concerning the application of film incentives, the validation of investments and expenditure, and the qualification of cinemas, film studios and specialized technical-service providers.

=== SIRECINE ===
The Cinematographic Information and Registration System (Spanish: Sistema de Información y Registro Cinematográfico; SIRECINE) maintains records of participants in the Dominican film industry, the commercialization of audiovisual works and attendance levels at movie theaters.

SIRECINE processes several production-related procedures, including the Single Filming Permit (Spanish: Permiso Único de Rodaje; PUR), the Provisional Certificate of Dominican Nationality (Spanish: Certificado Provisional de Nacionalidad Dominicana; CPND), the Definitive Certificate of Dominican Nationality (Spanish: Certificado Definitivo de Nacionalidad Dominicana; CDND) and temporary importation requests for filming equipment.

The PUR is issued free of charge and is required for audiovisual productions filming in Dominican territory, particularly when public spaces are used. Applications must be submitted at least 30 days before filming begins.

=== Film incentives ===
Article 39 of Law No. 108-10 establishes a transferable tax credit for qualifying Dominican and foreign audiovisual productions. The credit is equivalent to 25 per cent of qualifying expenditure incurred in the Dominican Republic and directly connected with development, pre-production, production and post-production.

Eligible projects include feature films, documentaries, television series, miniseries, music videos and short films. The programme establishes a minimum qualifying expenditure of US$500,000. The tax credit may be transferred to one or more Dominican taxpayers and cannot be sold for less than 60 per cent of its face value.

The legislation also provides an exemption from the 18 per cent tax on the transfer of industrialized goods and services, commonly known by its Spanish acronym ITBIS, for qualifying goods, services and rentals directly related to approved audiovisual productions.

Article 34 of the law establishes a separate mechanism for investment in Dominican feature films. Under that provision, qualifying investors may deduct the real value invested from their income-tax liability, subject to statutory limitations.

=== FONPROCINE ===
FONPROCINE is a public competition designed to support Dominican cinematographic projects. Its categories have included screenwriting, project development, production and post-production.

The fourteenth edition of the competition was launched in 2025. That edition included categories for project development, short-film production, animated short-film production and feature-length fiction or animation production.

== Film commission activity and industry development ==
Through its international film-commission functions, DGCINE provides local and foreign productions with information concerning fiscal incentives, production-related regulations, permits and local service companies.

A 2024 retrospective published by Acento reported that close to 900 productions had been filmed in the Dominican Republic since the creation of DGCINE, including more than 400 during the preceding four years. The report stated that the sector had mobilized more than RD$62.692 billion in investment for domestic and foreign productions since 2014.

In 2023, the Film Friendly Samaná initiative received the Emerging Location Award at the Global Production Awards. Screen Global Production reported that the initiative was recognized for an increased number of productions, attractive incentives, improvements in service levels, a growing crew base, infrastructure development and the variety of filming locations available in Samaná.

In 2025, DGCINE and the Center for Industrial Development and Competitiveness (Spanish: Centro de Desarrollo y Competitividad Industrial; ProIndustria) announced an initiative to develop San Gregorio de Nigua as an additional film-friendly destination, presenting it as an extension of the model previously implemented in Samaná.

== Dominican Cinematheque ==
The Dominican Cinematheque (Spanish: Cinemateca Dominicana) is a dependency of DGCINE responsible for rescuing, preserving, cataloguing, exhibiting and disseminating Dominican and international audiovisual heritage.

=== History and preservation ===
The institution was inaugurated as the National Cinematheque on 16 November 1979 through the work of Agliberto Meléndez, Omar Narpier and Adelso Cass. It closed in November 1987 and reopened on 16 March 2002. In August 2004, it adopted the name Cinemateca Dominicana.

The Cinematheque became affiliated with the International Federation of Film Archives (FIAF) in 2005 and currently appears in the federation's directory of associate institutions.

Following the enactment of Law No. 108-10, the Cinematheque became a dependency of DGCINE. In 2015, public institutions and representatives of the national film sector signed the Pact for the Preservation of Dominican Audiovisual Heritage. In 2017, a preservation vault was constructed for a collection containing more than 40,000 items. The results of the preservation project were presented at the 2018 FIAF congress in Prague.

Renovation work began in 2018. The institution later reopened its exhibition gallery and Sala B to the public in 2022, allowing regular screenings and cinematographic activities to resume.

=== Public programmes and services ===
The Cinematheque operates Cinemateca sobre Ruedas (literally, Cinematheque on Wheels), an outreach programme that screens Dominican and international films in alternative venues and outdoor spaces across the country.

Its programming also includes Dominican films broadcast through RTVD's Channel 4, online screenings through the Cinematheque's YouTube channel, free screenings in the Agliberto Meléndez screening room and Sala B, and weekly film forums.

The Cinematheque provides access to information resources held by its Arturo Rodríguez media library, guided visits for educational institutions and rentals of its facilities for events aligned with its preservation, educational and cultural mission.

== Offices ==
DGCINE is headquartered in the Gascue district of Santo Domingo. Its official contact page also lists an office on Avenida Teodoro Chassereaux in Santa Bárbara, Samaná.

== Directors general ==
- Ellis Pérez (2011–2013) – First director general of DGCINE.
- Yvette Marichal (2014–2021) – Appointed by President Danilo Medina under Decree No. 388-13.
- Marianna Vargas Gurilieva (2021–present) – Appointed by President Luis Abinader under Decree No. 21-21.

== See also ==
- Cinema of the Dominican Republic
- Culture of the Dominican Republic
- International Federation of Film Archives
- Film commission
