= Fausto Mata =

Dominican actor and comedian

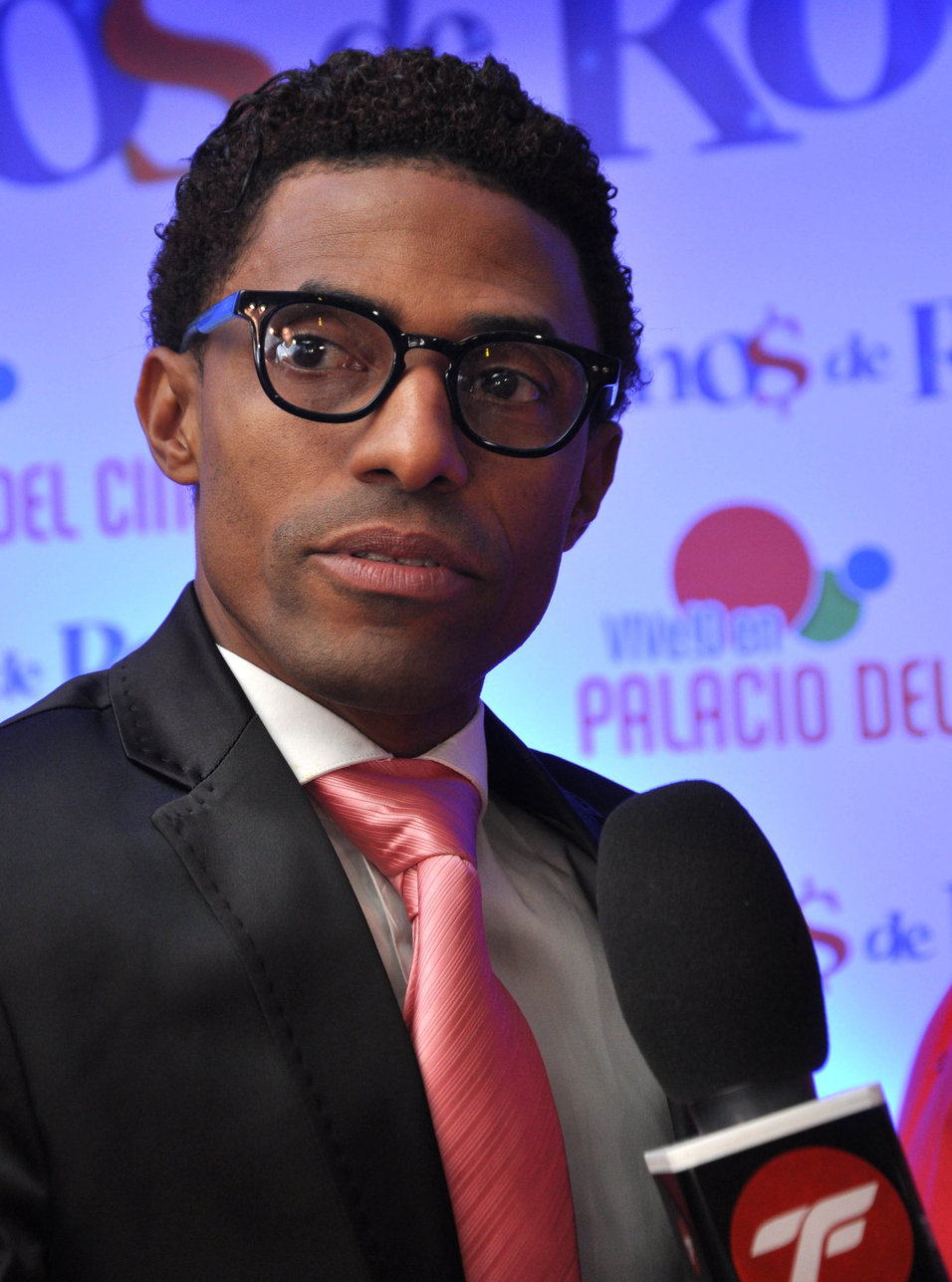
- Born: Fausto Genaro Mata Ortiz; October 13, 1968 (age 57); Santo Domingo, Dominican Republic
- Occupation: Comedian
- Years active: 1996–present
- Spouse: Celinet Pujols (2006-present)
- Children: Karl Enrique, Sol Linet
- Website: bocadepiano.com

Fausto Genaro Mata Ortiz (born October 13, 1968, in La Zurza, Santo Domingo), also known as Boca de Piano, is a Dominican comedian and actor. In 2002 he started a TV show named Boca de Piano es un Show.

He has also had a successful film acting career in movies like Perico Ripiao (2003), Papá se volvió loco (2005) and Sanky Panky (2007).

== Career ==
Fausto attended Universidad Nacional Pedro Henríquez Ureña also known as Sergio Adonis Guzmán Martínez, but before graduation decided to be an actor. He then attended the School of Fine Arts. He played a number of parts in the Theater Cocuyo, Charlotte Carter. His first role in television came when Juan Ramón Gómez Díaz saw him performing a character at the El Conuco restaurant.

Fausto worked as a comedian. His first film role was to star in the Dominican film "Sanky Panky" (José Enrique Pintor). Fausto then returned to the comedy theater "Politically Incorrect" (Ray Cooney) in a production of Rafael Ovalles. Most recently, he starred in Detective Willy.

== Filmography ==
Año	Título	Personaje
2003	Perico Ripiao	El Jengibrero
2004	Negocios son negocios	Periodista
2005	Los locos también piensan	Ladrón #2
2005	Papá se volvió loco	El Camarero
2007	Sanky Panky	Genaro
2009	Mega Diva	Luisito
2011	I Love Bachata	Tommy
2012	La Casa del Kilómetro 5	Locutor
2012	Feo de día, lindo de noche	Lorenzo
2013	Profe por accidente	Mon
2013	Sanky Panky 2	Genaro
2014	Un Lío en Dólares	Eulogio
2014	Vamos de Robo	Michael
2015	Los Paracaidistas	Jimmy
2015	Detective Willy	Willy
2015	Todo Incluido	Víctor
2015	Los Domirriqueños	Samuel
2016	Dos Policías en Apuros	Juan
2016	¿Pa' Qué Me Casé?	Braulio
2017	El Plan Perfecto	Rosendo
2017	El Peor Comediante del Mundo	Vendedor de Carro
2018	A tu lado	Martín
2018	Sanky Panky 3	Genaro
2018	El fantasma de mi novia	Juglar
2018	Jugando a Bailar	Felito
2019	Casi Fiel	Julián
2019	Los Domirriqueños 2	Samuel
2019	La Maravilla	Papi
2019	Súper Bomberos	Rogelio
2025	Carlota the Most Neighborhood-Like	Fuca
2025	Sanky Panky 4: de Safari	Genaro
