= Aquiles Correa =

Actor

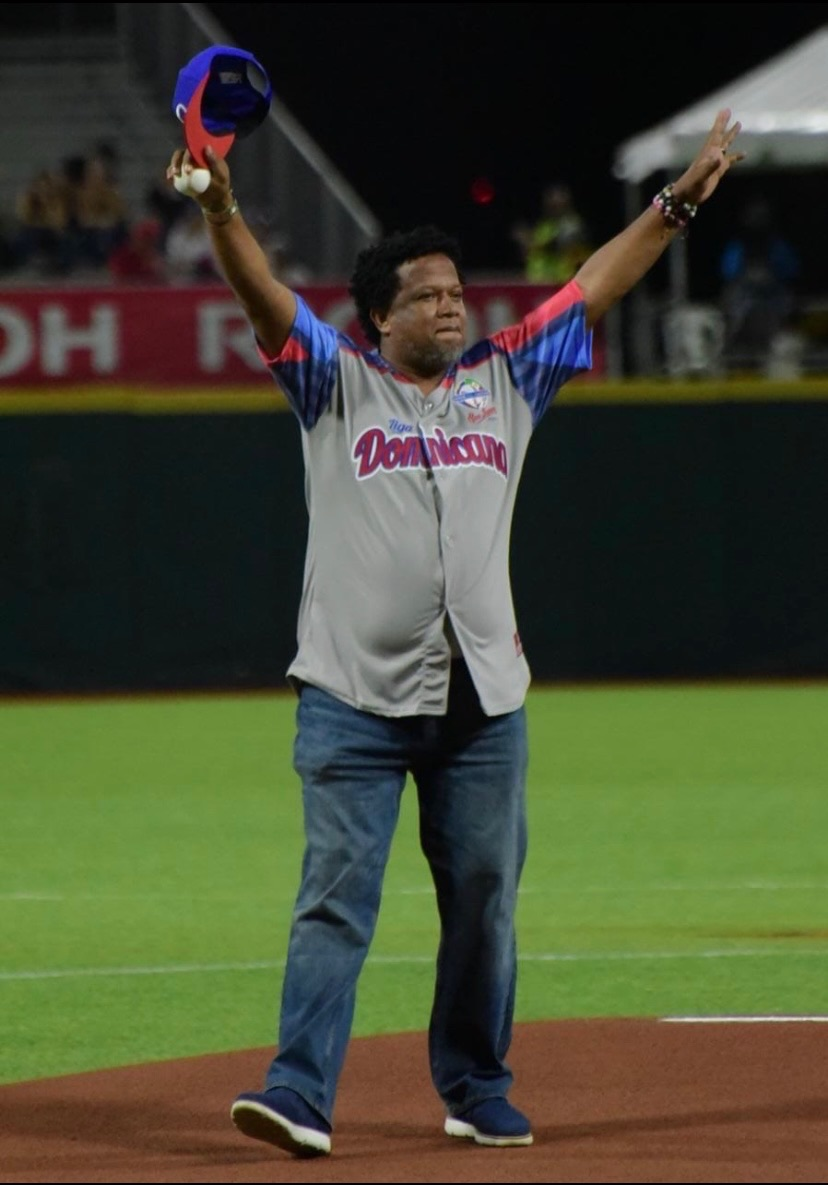
- Aquiles Correa during the 2020 Caribbean Series
- Born: Euclides Correa; September 24, 1971 (age 54); Villa Consuelo, the Dominican Republic
- Occupations: Actor; stand-up comedian
- Years active: 2000–present

Euclides Correa (born September 24, 1971) known professionally as Aquiles Correa, is a Dominican actor and stand-up comedian, known for the 'Sanky Panky' tetralogy and 'Santi Clo... La vaina de la Navidad'.

== Early life ==
Aquiles Correa was born in September 1971 in Villa Consuelo, the Dominican Republic. His parents are Sonia Martínez and Rafael Correa.

== Career ==
Correa began his career in radio in November 2000. He made his film debut doing a scene in Los locos también piensan (2005) till he landed his Carlitos role in Sanky Panky (2007).

He starred alongside Cheddy Garcia and Colombia Alcantara in the documentary "Amor de Batey", a work that deals with HIV/AIDS incidents in the neighborhood of the Dominican Republic.

In 2025, he played a supporting role as Gundo in Carlota the Most Neighborhood-Like directed by Yoel Morales.
