= El Gran Show season 18 =

El Gran Show
- Season 18
- Hosted by: Gisela Valcárcel; Aldo Díaz
- Judges: Morella Petrozzi; Pachi Valle Riestra; Carlos Cacho; Michelle Alexander
- Celebrity winner: Diana Sánchez
- Professional winner: Maylor Pérez
- No. of episodes: 10

Release
- Original network: América Televisión
- Original release: April 1 – June 3, 2017

Season chronology
- ← Previous; Season 17 Next → Season 19

Season one of the 2017 edition of El Gran Show premiered on April 1, 2017.

This season also featured a new segment called "Bailando por El Show", in which every week two new couples faced each other to get a pass to the original competition. The VIP Jury, which was formed by a member of the artistic medium, is no longer incorporated this season. On April 15, a special presentation was made for the 10 years of the show, so the third week was filed on the following date.

On June 3, 2017, Diana Sánchez and Maylor Pérez were declared the winners, Christian Domínguez and Isabel Acevedo finished second, while Andrea Luna and Marlon Pérez finished third.

== Cast ==
=== Couples ===
Celebrities and professional dancers were announced during the first week of the program. Christian Dominguez and Isabel Acevedo returned after being disqualified last season. In addition to Acevedo, Yamila Molina, George Neyra and Mariale Pineda returned to the program as professional dancers, the rest of the dancers are new to the track.

Celebrity	Notability (known for)	Professional partner	Status	Ref.
George Forsyth	Football player	Mía Hererra	Eliminated 1st on April 22, 2017	
Andrea San Martín	TV host & model	Charles Ramírez	Eliminated 2nd on April 29, 2017	
Carlos "Carloncho" Banderas	Announcer & TV host	Alexa Montoya	Eliminated 3rd on May 13, 2017	
Shirley Arica	Model	George Neyra	Eliminated 4th on May 20, 2017	
Viviana Rivasplata	Model & beauty queen	Jimmy García; André Lecca (weeks 5-7) (Note: Rivasplata also danced with Franco Bragagnini (week 2))	Eliminated 5th on May 27, 2017	
Cesar Távara	Manager & businessman	Yamila Molina	Eliminated 6th on June 3, 2017	
Yaco Eskenazi	TV host & model	Julliana Villacorta; Mariale Pineda (weeks 1-5)	Eliminated 7th on June 3, 2017	
Andrea Luna	Actress & model	Marlon Pérez	Third place on June 3, 2017	
Christian Domínguez	Singer & actor	Isabel Acevedo	Runner-up on June 3, 2017	
Diana Sánchez	Dancer & reality TV star	Maylor Pérez	Winner on June 3, 2017	

=== Hosts and judges ===
Gisela Valcárcel returned as host while Morella Petrozzi, Carlos Cacho, Michelle Alexander and Pachi Valle Riestra returned as judges. The VIP Judge was not incorporated this season. On May 27, Alfredo Di Natale (ex-judge, professional dancer and director of the Arthur Murray dance school) joined the panel as a guest judge, replacing Michelle Alexander who did not appear for personal reasons. In the final, there were ten VIP judges, who along with the main judges determined the winning couple.

== Scoring charts ==
Couple	Place	1	2	3	4 (Note: The couples were scored only with extra points awarded in four modalities of competition (2 points in each of these), so the highest score was 8.)	5	6	7	8	9		
Couple	Place	1	2	3	4	5	6	7	8	Top 5	Top 4	Top 3
Diana & Maylor	1	29	29	36	0	40	38	40	73	Safe	Safe	Winners
Christian & Isabel	2	—	33	33	8	40	31	41	66	Safe	Safe	Runner-up
Andrea L. & Marlon	3	28	29	32	8	34	35	37	63	Safe	Safe	Third place
Yaco & Mariale	4	21	26	26	0	30	31	32	62	Safe	Eliminated	
César & Yamlia	5	27	29	30	8	34	33	34	57	Eliminated		
Viviana & Jimmy	6	—	26	26	8	34	31	30	58			
Shirley & George	7	24	24	27	0	33	31	30				
Carloncho & Alexa	8	21	22	21	8	28	28					
Andrea S. & Charles	9	23	26	25	0							
George & Mía	10	—	22	25								

Red numbers indicate the sentenced for each week
Green numbers indicate the best steps for each week
"—" indicates the couple(s) did not dance that week
the couple was eliminated that week
the couple was safe in the duel
the couple was eliminated that week and safe with a lifeguard
the winning couple
the runner-up couple
the third-place couple

=== Average score chart ===
This table only counts dances scored on a 40-point scale.

Rank by average	Place	Couple	Total points	Number of dances	Average
1	1	Diana & Maylor	281	8	35.1
2	2	Christian & Isabel	240	7	34.3
3	3	Andrea L. & Marlon	256	8	32.0
4	5	César & Yamila	240	8	30.0
5	6	Viviana & Jimmy	203	7	29.0
6	4	Yaco & Mariale	226	8	28.3
7	7	Shirley & George	169	6	28.2
8	9	Andrea S. & Charles	74	3	24.7
9	8	Carloncho & Alexa	118	5	23.6
10	10	George & Mía	47	2	23.5

=== Highest and lowest scoring performances ===
The best and worst performances in each dance according to the judges' 40-point scale are as follows:

Dance	Highest scored dancer(s)	Highest score	Lowest scored dancer(s)	Lowest score
Cumbia	Christian Domínguez	38	Carlos "Carloncho" Banderas	21
Salsa	Diana Sánchez	35	Carlos "Carloncho" Banderas	22
Reggaetón	Andrea Luna	28	Yaco Eskenazi; Carlos "Carloncho" Banderas	21
Jazz	Diana Sánchez	38	Viviana Rivasplata	26
Bachata	Diana Sánchez; Christian Domínguez	39	Andrea Luna	29
Festejo	Yaco Eskenazi	30	—	—
Samba	Shirley Arica	33	—	—
Freestyle	Diana Sánchez	38	Carlos "Carloncho" Banderas	28
Marinera	Viviana Rivasplata	30	—	—
Tango	Yaco Eskenazi	30	—	—
Dance improvisation	Diana Sánchez	36	Cesar Távara	27
Cha-cha-cha	Diana Sánchez	37	Cesar Távara	30

=== Couples' highest and lowest scoring dances ===
Scores are based upon a potential 40-point maximum.

Couple	Highest scoring dance(s)	Lowest scoring dance(s)
Diana & Maylor	Bachata (39)	Salsa & Jazz (29)
Christian & Isabel	Bachata (39)	Freestyle & Reggaeton (31)
Andrea L. & Marlon	Bachata (37)	Reggaeton (28)
Yaco & Mariale	Jazz (33)	Reggaeton (21)
César & Yamila	Cumbia (34)	Reggaeton & Belly dance (27)
Viviana & Jimmy	Cumbia (32)	Jazz & Salsa (26)
Shirley & George	Samba (33)	Salsa & Cumbia (24)
Carloncho & Alexa	Freestyle (28)	Cumbia & Salsa (21)
Andrea S. & Charles	Salsa (26)	Cumbia (23)
George & Mía	Salsa (25)	Cumbia (22)

== Weekly scores ==
Individual judges' scores in the charts below (given in parentheses) are listed in this order from left to right: Morella Petrozzi, Carlos Cacho, Michelle Alexander, Pachi Valle Riestra.

=== Week 1: First Dances ===
The couples danced cumbia, reggaeton o salsa. Due to personal issues, not all couples danced and none were sentenced.

Running order

Couple	Scores	Dance	Music	Result
Carloncho & Alexa	21 (6, 7, 2, 6)	Cumbia	"Loquita"—Márama	Safe
Diana & Maylor	29 (8, 8, 5, 8)	Salsa	"Que Se Sepa"—Roberto Roena	Best steps
Yaco & Mariale	21 (6, 6, 3, 6)	Reggaeton	"La Temperatura"—Maluma feat. Eli Palacios	Safe
Andrea L. & Marlon	28 (8, 8, 4, 8)	Reggaeton	"Chantaje"—Shakira feat. Maluma	Safe
César & Yamila	27 (7, 7, 5, 8)	Reggaeton	"Mueve el Totó"—Apache Ness & Me Gusta ft. Juan Quin & Dago	Safe
Shirley & George	24 (7, 7, 3, 7)	Salsa	"Mala Mujer"—Zaperoko	Safe
Andrea S. & Charles	23 (6, 6, 3, 7)	Cumbia	"El Baile del Tiki Taka"—Hermanos Yaipén	Safe

=== Week 2: Party Night ===
The couples danced one unlearned dance.

Running order

Couple	Scores	Dance	Music	Result
Yaco & Mariale	26 (7, 8, 4, 7)	Cumbia	"Una Cerveza"—Ráfaga	Safe
Diana & Maylor	29 (8, 8, 5, 8)	Jazz	"Run the World (Girls)"—Beyoncé	Safe
Viviana & Franco	26 (7, 8, 4, 7)	Jazz	"Loca"—Shakira feat. El Cata	Safe
Christian & Isabel	33 (8, 9, 7, 9)	Bachata	"Propuesta Indecente"—Romeo Santos	Best steps
César & Yamila	29 (8, 8, 6, 7)	Salsa	"Lo Que Tengo Yo"—Los 4 feat. La Charanga Habanera	Safe
Shirley & George	24 (7, 7, 3, 7)	Cumbia	"No Juegues Con El Diablo"—Bareto	Safe
Andrea S. & Charles	26 (7, 8, 4, 7)	Salsa	"Ya Te Olvidé"—Vernis Hernández	Safe
George & Mía	22 (6, 7, 3, 7)	Cumbia	"Cariñito"—Bareto	Sentenced
Andrea L. & Marlon	29 (8, 8, 5, 8)	Bachata	"Déjà Vu"—Prince Royce feat. Shakira	Safe
Carloncho & Alexa	22 (7, 6, 3, 6)	Salsa	"Brujería"—El Gran Combo de Puerto Rico	Sentenced

=== Week 3: Salsa Night ===
The couples (except those sentenced) danced salsa and the danceathon. In the little train, only the men faced dancing strip dance.

Running order

Couple	Scores	Dance	Music	Result
César & Yamila	28 (7, 7, 7, 7)	Salsa	"El Preso"—Fruko y sus Tesos	Safe
Christian & Isabel	33 (8, 8, 8, 9)	Salsa	"Timbalero"—El Gran Combo de Puerto Rico	Safe
George & Mía	25 (7, 6, 5, 7)	Reggaeton*	"Hula Hoop"—Daddy Yankee	—
Carloncho & Alexa	21 (6, 6, 3, 6)	Reggaeton*	"Súbeme la Radio"—Enrique Iglesias	Sentenced
Shirley & George	27 (7, 6, 6, 8)	Salsa	"Param Pam Pam"—Oscar D'León	Safe
Yaco & Mariale	26 (7, 6, 6, 7)	Salsa	"El Chico Chévere"—Albita Rodríguez	Safe
Andrea S. & Charles	25 (6, 7, 5, 7)	Salsa	"Acuyuyé"—DLG	Sentenced
Andrea L. & Marlon	32 (8, 8, 8, 8)	Salsa	"Ven Morena"—Oscar D'León	Safe
Viviana & Jimmy	26 (7, 6, 6, 7)	Salsa	"Sal a Bailar"—Víctor Manuelle	Safe
Diana & Maylor	35 (8, 9, 9, 9)	Salsa	"Mis Historias Entre Tus Dedos"—Los 4	Best steps
Shirley & George; Carloncho & Alexa; Christian & Isabel; Yaco & Mariale; George & Mía; Andrea L. & Marlon; Viviana & Franco; Andrea S. & Charles; Diana & Maylor; César & Yamila	2	Salsa (The danceathon)	"Mala Mujer"—Zaperoko	

The little train
Participants	Judges' votes	Dance	Music	Winner
Men	César, César, César, Charles	Strip dance	"Se Menea y el Taka Taka"—Nolberto Alkala "Mueve el Cucuta"—Apache Ness	César (2 pts)

The duel*

- George & Mía: Eliminated
- Carloncho & Alexa: Safe

=== Week 4: Team Night ===
The couples were divided into two teams led by Christian & Isabel and Yaco & Mariale, both faced each other by performing the team dances, the versus and the little-train. The team with the highest score, Christian Group, won the best steps while the Team Yaco passed sentence. The sentenced couples performed their dances, although they were not considered in the final performance.

Due to personal issues, Viviana Rivasplata and Franco Bragagnini were not present at the gala, so the winning couple of the season 1 of 2016, Milett Figueroa and Patricio Quiñones, they replaced.

Couple (Team)	Judges' votes	Dance	Music	Result
Christian & Isabel; Andrea L. & Marlon; Carloncho & Alexa; César & Yamila; Milett & Pato (Team Christian)	Yaco, Christian, Yaco, Christian	Cumbia	"Sangre Caliente"—Ruth Karina	Winners (2 pts)
Yaco & Mariale; Andrea S. & Charles; Diana & Maylor; Shirley & George (Team Yaco)	Yaco, Christian, Yaco, Christian	Cumbia	"Siqui Siqui"—Euforia	Losers
The versus
Milett & Pato (Team Christian)	Milett, Milett, Milett, Milett	Bachata	"Eres Mía"—Romeo Santos	Winners (2 pts)
Diana & Maylor (Team Yaco)	Milett, Milett, Milett, Milett	Bachata	"Quiéreme"—Johnny sky	Losers
Andrea L. & Marlon (Team Christian)	Shirley, Andrea L., Andrea L., Shirley	Strip dance	"Lo Hecho Está Hecho"—Shakira	Winners (2 pts)
Shirley & George (Team Yaco)	Shirley, Andrea L., Andrea L., Shirley	Strip dance	"Naughty Girl"—Beyoncé	Losers
The little train
Men (Team Christian)	Christian, Christian, Christian, Yaco	Reggaetón	"Mueve el Totó"—Apache Ness & Me Gusta ft. Juan Quin & Dago	Winners (2 pts)
Men (Team Yaco)	Christian, Christian, Christian, Yaco	Reggaetón	"Mueve el Totó"—Apache Ness & Me Gusta ft. Juan Quin & Dago	Losers

The duel
Couple	Dance	Music	Result
Carloncho & Alexa	Jazz	"La Mordidita"—Ricky Martin feat. Yotuel Romero	Safe
Andrea S. & Charles	Jazz	"Work Bitch" / "Womanizer" / "Toxic"—Britney Spears	Eliminated

=== Week 5: Cumbia Night ===
The couples (except those sentenced) danced cumbia. In the versus, only three couples faced dancing strip dance, the winner would take two extra points plus the couples who gave their support votes

Viviana Rivasplata returned after being absent the past week, this time with the dancer André Lecca who replaced Franco Bragagnini.

Running order

Couple	Scores	Dance	Music	Result
Viviana & André	32 (8, 8, 8, 8)	Cumbia	"Mentirosa"—Gran Orquesta Internacional	Safe
Christian & Isabel	38 (10, 9, 9, 10)	Cumbia	"Me Gusta Todo de Ti"—Gran Orquesta Internacional	Best steps
Yaco & Mariale	30 (8, 8, 7, 7)	Festejo*	"Inga"—Eva Ayllón	Sentenced
Diana & Maylor	38 (9, 10, 10, 9)	Jazz*	"Bitch Better Have My Money"—Rihanna	Best steps
Shirley & George	33 (8, 9, 8, 8)	Samba*	"Jazz Machine"—Black Machine / "Magalenha"—Sérgio Mendes	Safe
César & Yamila	34 (8, 9, 8, 9)	Cumbia	"No Te Vayas"—Gran Orquesta Internacional	Safe
Carloncho & Alexa	26 (7, 6, 7, 6)	Cumbia	"No Te Creas Tan Importante"—Gran Orquesta Internacional	Sentenced
Andrea L. & Marlon	32 (8, 8, 8, 8)	Cumbia	"Ya Te Olvide"—Gran Orquesta Internacional	Safe

The versus
Couples (Supporters)	Judges' votes	Dance	Music	Winner
Christian & Isabel (Andrea L., Carloncho, Diana, Viviana)	Christian, Christian, Yaco, Christian	Strip dance	"Crazy"—Aerosmith	Winners (2 pts)
Yaco & Mariale (César, Shirley)	Christian, Christian, Yaco, Christian	Strip dance	"Cryin'"—Aerosmith	Losers

The duel*

- Yaco & Mariale: Safe
- Diana & Maylor: Safe
- Shirley & George: Eliminated (but safe with the lifeguard)

=== Week 6: Characterization Night ===
The couples performed one unlearned dance being characterized to popular music icons.

Due to personal issues, Mariale Pineda could no longer dance with Yaco Eskenazi, so the troupe member Julianna Villacorta replaced her.

Running order

Couple	Scores	Dance	Music	Characterization	Result
Christian & Isabel	31 (8, 8, 8, 7)	Jazz	"Smooth Criminal"—Michael Jackson	Michael Jackson	Saved
César & Yamila	33 (9, 7, 9, 8)	Salsa	"La Vida Es Un Carnaval"—Celia Cruz	Celia Cruz	Safe
Andrea L. & Marlon	35 (8, 9, 9, 9)	Jazz	"Poker Face"—Lady Gaga	Lady Gaga	Safe
Shirley & George	31 (8, 9, 7, 7)	Salsa	"Déjala"—Yahaira Plasencia	Yahaira Plasencia	Sentenced
Yaco & Julianna	31 (7, 8, 8, 8)	Jazz*	"Livin' la Vida Loca"—Ricky Martin	Ricky Martin	Sentenced
Carloncho & Alexa	28 (7, 7, 7, 7)	Jazz*	"Dr. Psiquiatra"—Gloria Trevi	Gloria Trevi	—
Diana & Maylor	38 (10, 10, 9, 9)	Jazz	"On the Floor"—Jennifer Lopez	Jennifer Lopez	Best steps
Viviana & André	31 (8, 8, 7, 8)	Jazz	"Crazy in Love"—Beyoncé feat. Jay Z	Beyoncé	Sentenced

The duel*

- Yaco & Julianna: Safe
- Carloncho & Alexa: Eliminated

=== Week 7: Bachata Night ===
The couples (except those sentenced) danced bachata and a team dance, in which only celebrities participated.

Running order

Couple	Scores	Dance	Music	Result
Diana & Maylor	40 (10, 11, 10, 9)	Bachata	"Los Infieles"—Aventura	Safe
Viviana & André	30 (8, 7, 7, 8)	Marinera*	"Chiclayanita"—Ramón Aviles y Los Aviles	Sentenced
Shirley & George	30 (7, 8, 7, 8)	Jazz*	"You're the One That I Want" / "We Go Together"—from Grease	—
Yaco & Julianna	30 (7, 8, 8, 7)	Tango*	"Por una Cabeza"—Carlos Gardel & Alfredo Le Pera	Sentenced
César & Yamila	32 (8, 8, 8, 8)	Bachata	"Despacito"—Grupo Extra	Safe
Andrea L. & Marlon	37 (10, 8, 10, 9)	Bachata	"Dos Locos"—Monchy & Alexandra	Safe
Christian & Isabel	39 (10, 9, 10, 10)	Bachata	"Todo Por Tu Amor"—Xtreme	Best steps
Christian; Yaco; César	2	Strip dance (Team A)	"Come Together"—Kris Allen	
Shirley; Andrea L. Viviana; Diana	0	Strip dance (Team B)	"Worth It"—Fifth Harmony feat. Kid Ink	

The duel*

- Viviana & André: Eliminated (but safe with the lifeguard)
- Shirley & George: Eliminated
- Yaco & Julianna: Safe

=== Week 8: Semifinals ===
Individual judges' scores in the charts below (given in parentheses) are listed in this order from left to right: Morella Petrozzi, Carlos Cacho, Alfredo Di Natale, Pachi Valle Riestra.

The couples performed a dance improvisation which involved seven different dance styles, all being rehearsed during the week by the couples and only one being chosen by a draw in the live show and a trio cha-cha-cha involving another celebrity (except those sentenced).

Running order

Couple (Trio Dance Partner)	Scores	Dance	Music	Result
Christian & Isabel (Maricielo Effio)	31 (8, 8, 7, 8)	Reggaeton	"Watch Out for This (Bumaye)"—Daddy Yankee feat. Major Lazer	Safe
Christian & Isabel (Maricielo Effio)	35 (9, 9, 8, 9)	Cha-cha-cha	"Echa Pa'lante"—Thalía	Safe
Diana & Maylor (Karen Dejo)	36 (9, 9, 9, 9)	Festejo	"Chacombo"—Arturo "Zambo" Cavero	Best steps
Diana & Maylor (Karen Dejo)	37 (10, 9, 9, 9)	Cha-cha-cha	"La Llave de Mi Corazón"—Juan Luis Guerra	Best steps
Viviana & Jimmy	28 (7, 7, 7, 7)	Quebradita	"Pasito Perrón"—Dinastia Mendoza	—
Viviana & Jimmy	30 (8, 7, 7, 8)	Jazz*	"Cell Block Tango"—from Chicago	—
César & Yamila (Cindy Marino)	27 (6, 8, 6, 7)	Belly dance	"Whenever, Wherever"—Shakira	Sentenced
César & Yamila (Cindy Marino)	30 (8, 7, 7, 8)	Cha-cha-cha	"Traigo Una Pena"—Franco De Vita & Víctor Manuelle	Sentenced
Andrea L. & Marlon (Lucas Piro)	29 (7, 8, 7, 7)	Merengue	"La Cosquillita"—Juan Luis Guerra	Safe
Andrea L. & Marlon (Lucas Piro)	34 (9, 8, 8, 9)	Cha-cha-cha	"Papi"—Jennifer Lopez	Safe
Yaco & Julianna	29 (7, 7, 7, 8)	Salsa	"Tú de Qué Vas"—Los 4	Sentenced
Yaco & Julianna	33 (8, 9, 8, 8)	Jazz*	"(I've Had) The Time of My Life"—from Dirty Dancing	Sentenced

The duel*

- Viviana & Jimmy: Eliminated
- Yaco & Julianna: Safe

=== Week 9: Final ===
On the first part, the couples danced freestyle.

On the second part, the four finalist couples performed peruvian dances.

On the third part, the three finalist couples danced a viennese waltz.

Running order (Part 1)

Couple	Dance	Music	Result
César & Yamila	Freestyle*	"Ámame Una Vez Más"—Amanda Miguel / Los 4	Eliminated
Yaco & Julianna	Freestyle*	"Mambo No. 5 (A Little Bit Of...)"—Lou Bega	Safe
Christian & Isabel	Freestyle	"Tengo Un Amor"—Toby Love / "Cachondea"—Fruko y sus Tesos	—
Andrea L. & Marlon	Freestyle	"SOS" / "Don't Stop the Music"—Rihanna	—
Diana & Maylor	Freestyle	"What I Like About You"—Lillix	—

Running order (Part 2)

Couple	Dance	Music	Result
Andrea L. & Marlon	Huayno	"Valicha"—Miguel Ángel Hurtado Delgado	Safe
Diana & Maylor	Huaylasrh	"Pío Pío"—Eusebio "Chato" Grados	Safe
Yaco & Julianna	Saya	"Veneno Para Olvidar"—Grupo Huella	Eliminated
Christian & Isabel	Marinera	"San Miguel de Piura"—Artidoro Obando García	Safe

Running order (Part 3)

Couple	Dance	Music	Result
Andrea L. & Marlon	Viennese waltz	"Iris"—Goo Goo Dolls	Third place
Diana & Maylor	Viennese waltz	"You Light Up My Life"—Debby Boone	Winner
Christian & Isabel	Viennese waltz	"Ahora Tú"—Malú	Runner-up

== Dance chart ==
The celebrities and professional partners will dance one of these routines for each corresponding week:

- Week 1: Cumbia, reggaeton or salsa (First Dances)
- Week 2: One unlearned dance (Party Night)
- Week 3: Salsa & the danceathon (Salsa Night)
- Week 4: Team dances, the versus & the little train (Team Night)
- Week 5: Cumbia & the versus (Cumbia Night)
- Week 6: One unlearned dance (Characterization Night)
- Week 7: Bachata & the little train (Bachata Night)
- Week 8: Dance improvisation & trio cha-cha-cha (Semifinal)
- Week 9: freestyle, peruvian dances & viennese waltz (Final)

Couple	Week 1	Week 2	Week 3	Week 4	Week 5	Week 6	Week 7	Week 8		Week 9		
Diana & Maylor	Salsa	Jazz	Salsa	Team Yaco	Jazz	Jazz	Bachata	Festejo	Cha-cha-cha	Freestyle	Huaylasrh	Viennese waltz
Christian & Isabel	—	Bachata	Salsa	Team Christian	Cumbia	Jazz	Bachata	Reggaeton	Cha-cha-cha	Freestyle	Marinera	Viennese waltz
Andrea L. & Marlon	Reggaeton	Bachata	Salsa	Team Christian	Cumbia	Jazz	Bachata	Merengue	Cha-cha-cha	Freestyle	Huayno	Viennese waltz
Yaco & Mariale	Reggaeton	Cumbia	Salsa	Team Yaco	Jazz	Freestyle	Tango	Salsa	Jazz	Freestyle	Saya	
César & Yamila	Reggaeton	Salsa	Salsa	Team Christian	Cumbia	Salsa	Bachata	Belly dance	Cha-cha-cha	Freestyle		
Viviana & Franco	—	Jazz	Salsa	Team Christian	Cumbia	Jazz	Marinera	Quebradita	Jazz			
Shirley & George	Salsa	Cumbia	Salsa	Team Yaco	Samba	Salsa	Jazz					
Carloncho & Alexa	Cumbia	Salsa	Reggaetón	Team Christian	Cumbia	Jazz						
Andrea S. & Charles	Cumbia	Salsa	Salsa	Team Yaco								
George & Mía	—	Cumbia	Reggaeton									

Modalities of competition
Couple	Week 3		Week 4				Week 5	Week 7
Christian & Isabel	Salsa	Strip dance	Cumbia	Bachata	Strip dance	Reggaeton	Strip dance	Strip dance
Yaco & Mariale	Salsa	Strip dance	Cumbia	Bachata	Strip dance	Reggaeton	Strip dance	Strip dance
Andrea L. & Marlon	Salsa	Strip dance	Cumbia	Bachata	Strip dance	Reggaeton	Strip dance	Strip dance
Viviana & Franco	Salsa	Strip dance	Cumbia	Bachata	Strip dance	Reggaeton	Strip dance	Strip dance
Diana & Maylor	Salsa	Strip dance	Cumbia	Bachata	Strip dance	Reggaeton	Strip dance	Strip dance
César & Yamila	Salsa	Strip dance	Cumbia	Bachata	Strip dance	Reggaeton	Strip dance	Strip dance
Shirley & George	Salsa	Strip dance	Cumbia	Bachata	Strip dance	Reggaeton	Strip dance	Strip dance
Carloncho & Alexa	Salsa	Strip dance	Cumbia	Bachata	Strip dance	Reggaeton	Strip dance	
Andrea S. & Charles	Salsa	Strip dance	Cumbia	Bachata	Strip dance	Reggaeton		
George & Mía	Salsa	Strip dance						

"—" indicates the couple(s) did not dance that week
Highest scoring dance
Lowest scoring dance
Gained bonus points for winning
Gained no bonus points for losing
Danced, but not scored
In Italic indicate the dance in "The duel"

== Guest judges ==
Date	Guest judge	Occupation(s)
June 3, 2017	Ducelia Woll	Professional dancer & choreographer
June 3, 2017	Ernesto Pimentel	TV Host
June 3, 2017	Gina Natteri	Professional dancer & dance director
June 3, 2017	Jimmy Gamonet De Los Heros	Professional dancer & art director
June 3, 2017	Mateo Chiarella Viale	Theater director
June 3, 2017	Joksan Balcázar	Marinera dancer
June 3, 2017	Rocío Tovar	Theater director
June 3, 2017	Ismael La Rosa	Actor & TV host
June 3, 2017	Roberto Murias	Professional dancer & art director
June 3, 2017	Ronald Guillen	Professional dancer
