= El Gran Show season 19 =

El Gran Show: Campeonato mundial de baile
- Season 19
- Hosted by: Gisela Valcárcel; Aldo Díaz
- Judges: Morella Petrozzi; Pachi Valle Riestra; Carlos Cacho; Tilsa Lozano
- Celebrity winner: Brenda Carvalho
- Professional winner: Kevin Ubillus
- No. of episodes: 12

Release
- Original network: América Televisión
- Original release: June 10 – August 26, 2017

Season chronology
- ← Previous; Season 18 Next → Season 20

Season two of the 2017 edition of El Gran Show premiered on June 10, 2017.

The season was also named as the "First World Dance Championship", because the participating couples represented the countries of origin of the celebrities.

On August 26, 2017, Brenda Carvalho and her professional partner Kevin Ubillus were declared the winners, Lucas Piró and his sister Maru Piró finished second, while Belén Estévez and Waldir Felipa finished third.

== Cast ==
=== Couples ===
The first seven celebrities were presented on Wednesday, June 7, 2017, at a press conference. All the presented were former contestants of the show, being Lucas Piró the first professional dancer who returned participating as a celebrity. In the first week were presented the professional dancers, in addition to the entrance of one more celebrity, Alexander Kobzar. In the second week, a new pair entered the show, Cinthya Coppiano and Jimy García. In the Week 8, another pair entered the show, former contestant Thiago Cunha and the eliminated dancer Yamila Molina.

Country	Celebrity	Notability (known for)	Professional partner	Status	Ref.
Costa Rica	Carlos "Coto" Hernández	Model & reality TV star	Yamila Molina	Eliminated 1st on July 1, 2017	
Ecuador	Cinthya Coppiano	Actress & TV host	Jimy García	Eliminated 2nd on July 8, 2017	
Colombia	Milena Zárate	Singer	George Neyra	Eliminated 3rd on July 15, 2017	
Ukraine	Alexander Kobzar	Model	Isabel Martínez	Eliminated 4th on August 12, 2017	
Peru	Milett Figueroa	Model & reality TV star	Sergio Álvarez; Patricio Quiñones (Weeks 1-4)	Eliminated 5th on August 19, 2017	
Brazil	Thiago Cunha	Reality TV star	Yamila Molina	Eliminated 6th on August 26, 2017	
Peru	Karen Dejo	Actress & TV host	Oreykel Hidalgo	Eliminated 7th on August 26, 2017	
Argentina	Belén Estévez	Ex-vedette	Waldir Felipa; Gian Frank Navarro (Week 8)	Third place on August 26, 2017	
Argentina	Lucas Piro	Dancer & TV personality	Maru Piro	Runner-up on August 26, 2017	
Brazil	Brenda Carvalho	Axé star	Kevin Ubillus	Winner on August 26, 2017	

=== Hosts and judges ===
Gisela Valcárcel returned as host while Morella Petrozzi, Carlos Cacho and Pachi Valle Riestra returned as judges. During the first three weeks, Michelle Alexander could not be present due to labor reasons, being replaced in the second and third week by the former contestants Santi Lesmes and Tilsa Lozano, respectively. On the fourth week, it was confirmed that Alexander would not return to the program for personal reasons, so Lozano entered as a new judge in her place. On August 5, professional dancer & art director Jimmy Gamonet de los Heros, filling in for Valle Riestra.

== Scoring charts ==
Couple	Place	1	2	3	4	5	6	7	8	9	10	11		
Couple	Place	1	2	3	4	5	6	7	8	9	10	Top 5	Top 4	Top 3
Brenda & Kevin	1	25	35	35	36	39	42	42	33	40	126	39	40	38
Lucas & Maru	2	26	38	42	41	41	36	39	38	37	129	36	39	44
Belén & Waldir	3	26	36	37	39	38	42	36	33	45	127	39	36	37
Karen & Oreykel	4	24	37	33	40	39	42	37	30	38	123	36	36	
Thiago & Yamila	5	—N/a							30	33	101	31		
Milett & Sergio	6	22	35	29	34	36	35	34	31	35	100			
Alexander & Isabel	7	22	27	27	35	29	30	28	27	28				
Milena & George	8	20	32	30	34	33	35							
Cinthya & Jimy	9	—N/a	33	31	34	33								
Coto & Yamila	10	22	29	29	33									

Red numbers indicate the sentenced for each week
Green numbers indicate the best steps for each week
"—" indicates the couple(s) did not dance that week
the couple was eliminated that week
the couple was safe in the duel
the couple was eliminated that week and safe with a lifeguard
the winning couple
the runner-up couple
the third-place couple

=== Average score chart ===
This table only counts dances scored on a 40-point scale.

Rank by average	Place	Couple	Total points	Number of dances	Average
1	2	Lucas & Maru	532	14	38.0
2	1	Brenda & Kevin	520	14	37.1
2	3	Belén & Waldir	520	14	37.1
4	4	Karen & Oreykel	468	13	36.0
5	9	Cinthya & Jimy	130	4	32.5
6	6	Milett & Sergio	357	11	32.4
7	8	Milena & George	190	6	31.7
8	5	Thiago & Yamila	157	5	31.4
9	10	Coto & Yamila	120	4	30.0
10	7	Alexander & Isabel	258	9	28.7

=== Highest and lowest scoring performances ===
The best and worst performances in each dance according to the judges' 40-point scale are as follows:

Dance	Highest scored dancer(s)	Highest score	Lowest scored dancer(s)	Lowest score
Salsa	Belén Estévez; Brenda Carvalho	40	Milena Zárate	27
World dances	Lucas Piró	38	Alexander Kobzar	27
Cumbia	Lucas Piró	40	Alexander Kobzar	28
Jazz	Milett Figueroa	34	Alexander Kobzar	27
Bachata	Lucas Piró	40	Milett Figueroa	29
Huayno	Alexander Kobzar	35	—	—
Tango	Karen Dejo; Lucas Piró	38	Milett Figueroa	36
Bollywood	Lucas Piró	40	Alexander Kobzar	29
Reggaeton	Belén Estévez	37	Alexander Kobzar	28
Lambada	Lucas Piró	40	Brenda Carvalho	39
Rumba flamenca	Milett Figueroa	32	—	—
Merengue	Lucas Piró	39	Belén Estévez	34
Tex-mex	Karen Dejo	28	—	—
Rock and roll	Lucas Piró	36	—	—
Quebradita	Thiago Cunha	30	—	—
Cha-cha-cha	Belén Estévez	40	Milett Figueroa	33
Contemporary	Lucas Piró	39	Milett Figueroa	33
Marinera	Brenda Carvalho	38	—	—
Samba	Brenda Carvalho	39	Belén Estévez	38
Heroes dance	Belén Estévez; Brenda Carvalho	39	Thiago Cunha; Milett Figueroa	30
Festejo	Karen Dejo	36	—	—
Viennese waltz	Lucas Piró	40	Belén Estévez	37

=== Couples' highest and lowest scoring dances ===
Scores are based upon a potential 40-point maximum.

Couple	Highest scoring dance(s)	Lowest scoring dance(s)
Brenda & Kevin	Salsa (40)	Salsa & Bachata (33)
Lucas & Maru	Bachata, Cumbia, Lambada, Bollywood & Viennese waltz (40)	Salsa (34)
Belén & Waldir	Salsa & Cha-cha-cha (40)	Jazz (33)
Karen & Oreykel	Cumbia & Salsa (39)	Tex-mex (28)
Thiago & Yamila	Salsa & Hip-hop (33)	Quebradita & Hip-hop (30)
Milett & Sergio	Tango (36)	Salsa & Bachata (29)
Alexander & Isabel	Huayno (35)	Hopak, Jazz (x2) (27)
Milena & George	Cumbia (35)	Salsa (27)
Cynthia & Jimmy	Salsa, Cumbia & Jazz (33)	Bachata (31)
Coto & Yamila	Jazz (33)	Salsa, Tex-mex & Cumbia (29)

== Weekly scores ==
Individual judges' scores in the charts below (given in parentheses) are listed in this order from left to right: Morella Petrozzi, Carlos Cacho, Tilsa Lozano, Pachi Valle Riestra.

=== Week 1: Salsa Night ===
Individual judges' scores in the charts below (given in parentheses) are listed in this order from left to right: Morella Petrozzi, Carlos Cacho, Pachi Valle Riestra.

The couples danced salsa. This week none couples were sentenced.

Running order

Couple	Scores	Dance	Music	Result
Coto & Yamila	22 (7, 8, 7)	Salsa	"La Salsa Vive"—Tito Nieves	Safe
Milett & Patricio	22 (7, 8, 7)	Salsa	"La Malanga"—Mercado Negro	Safe
Milena & George	20 (7, 6, 7)	Salsa	"Al Son de los Cueros"—Sonora Carruseles	Safe
Belén & Waldir	27 (9, 9, 9)	Salsa	"I Love Salsa"—N'Klabe	Best steps
Alexander & Isabel	22 (7, 8, 7)	Salsa	"Que Se Sepa"—Roberto Roena	Safe
Brenda & Kevin	26 (8, 9, 9)	Salsa	"Bemba Colorá"—Celia Cruz	Safe
Lucas & Maru	27 (9, 9, 9)	Salsa	"Pelotero a la Bola"—Hansel & Raúl	Best steps
Karen & Oreykel	24 (8, 8, 8)	Salsa	"Vengo Caliente"—Sonora Carruseles	Safe

=== Week 2: World dances ===
Individual judges' scores in the charts below (given in parentheses) are listed in this order from left to right: Morella Petrozzi, Carlos Cacho, Santi Lesmes, Pachi Valle Riestra.

The couples performed the world dances, except for Cinthya Coppiano and Jimy García, who entered this week and danced salsa for being the style of the past week.

Due to personal issues, Milett Figueroa was not present at the gala, being replaced by the winner of previous season, Diana Sánchez.

Running order

Couple	Scores	Dance	Music	Result
Milena & George	32 (8, 8, 8, 8)	(Colombia) Mapalé	"La Pollera Colorá"—Alberto Ramos / Andrea Jaramillo	Safe
Coto & Yamila	29 (7, 8, 7, 7)	(Costa Rica) Tex-mex	"Mireya"—Los Ajenos	Sentenced
Diana & Patricio	35 (9, 8, 9, 9)	(Peru) Cumbia	"El Baile del Tiki Taka"—Hermanos Yaipén	Safe
Belén & Waldir	36 (10, 9, 8, 9)	(Argentina) Tango	"El Choclo"—Ángel Villoldo	Safe
Brenda & Kevin	35 (10, 8, 8, 9)	(Brazil) Samba	"Samba do Brasil"—Bellini	Safe
Alexander & Isabel	27 (7, 7, 7, 6)	(Ukraine) Hopak	"Ukrainian Hopak"—The Ukrainians	Sentenced
Lucas & Maru	38 (10, 9, 10, 9)	(Argentina) Chacarera	"A Don Ata"—Soledad Pastorutti	Safe
Karen & Oreykel	37 (10, 9, 9, 9)	(Peru) Festejo	"Chacombo"—Arturo "Zambo" Cavero	Safe
Cynthia & Jimy	33 (9, 8, 8, 8)	Salsa	"Ese Hombre"—Los 4 feat. Los Barraza	Safe

=== Week 3: Bachata Under the Rain ===
The couples (except those sentenced) danced bachata under the rain.

Running order

Couple	Scores	Dance	Music	Result
Coto & Yamila	29 (8, 7, 7, 7)	Cumbia*	"Cumbia Tribalera"—El Pelon del Mikrophone	Sentenced
Alexander & Isabel	27 (8, 6, 6, 7)	Jazz*	"Footloose"—Kenny Loggins	Sentenced
Milett & Patricio	29 (8, 7, 8, 6)	Bachata	"No Es Una Novela"—Monchy & Alexandra	Sentenced
Belén & Waldir	37 (9, 9, 10, 9)	Bachata	"Tengo Un Amor"—Toby Love	Safe
Milena & George	30 (7, 7, 8, 8)	Bachata	"Te Robaré"—Prince Royce	Safe
Lucas & Maru	42 (10, 11, 11, 10)	Bachata	"Te Extraño"—Xtreme	Best steps
Cynthia & Jimy	31 (8, 8, 8, 7)	Bachata	"Déjà Vu"—Prince Royce feat. Shakira	Safe
Karen & Oreykel	33 (8, 8, 9, 8)	Bachata	"Darte un Beso"—Prince Royce	Safe
Brenda & Kevin	35 (9, 9, 9, 8)	Bachata	"Dile al Amor"—Aventura	Safe

The duel*

- Coto & Yamila: Eliminated (but safe with the lifeguard)
- Alexander & Isabel: Safe

=== Week 4: Cumbia Night ===
The couples (except those sentenced) danced cumbia. In the versus, only three couples faced dancing hip-hop, the winner would take two extra points plus the couples who gave their support votes.

Running order

Couple	Scores	Dance	Music	Result
Milett & Patricio	34 (9, 9, 8, 8)	Jazz*	"Where Have You Been"—Rihanna	Sentenced
Coto & Yamila	33 (9, 8, 8, 8)	Jazz*	"He's a Pirate"—Klaus Badelt	—N/a
Alexander & Isabel	35 (8, 10, 9, 8)	Huayno*	"Miau Miau"—Amanda Portales	Safe
Brenda & Kevin	35 (9, 9, 9, 9)	Cumbia	"Agonía de Amor"—Dilbert Aguilar	Safe
Lucas & Maru	41 (10, 10, 11, 10)	Cumbia	"El Estúpido"—Corazón Serrano	Best steps
Cynthia & Jimy	33 (8, 9, 8, 8)	Cumbia	"30 Segundos"—Marisol y la Magia del Norte	Sentenced
Belén & Waldir	39 (10, 9, 10, 10)	Cumbia	"Despacito"—Hermanos Yaipén	Safe
Milena & George	33 (8, 9, 8, 8)	Cumbia	"La Caderona"—Los Villacorta	Sentenced
Karen & Oreykel	39 (10, 9, 10, 10)	Cumbia	"La Culebritica"—Grupo 5	Safe

The versus
Couple (Supporters)	Judges' votes	Dance	Music	Result
Brenda & Kevin (Karen, Cynthia, Milena)	Brenda, Brenda, Brenda, Brenda	Hip-hop	"Dirrty"—Christina Aguilera feat. Redman	Winners (1 pt)
Lucas & Maru (Milett)	Brenda, Brenda, Brenda, Brenda	Hip-hop	"SexyBack"—Justin Timberlake	Losers
Belén & Waldir (Alexander)	Brenda, Brenda, Brenda, Brenda	Hip-hop	"Hey Mama"—David Guetta feat. Nicki Minaj, Bebe Rexha & Afrojack	Losers

The duel*

- Milett & Patricio: Safe
- Coto & Yamila: Eliminated
- Alexander & Isabel: Safe

=== Week 5: Dances in the Sand ===
The couples (except those sentenced) performed one unlearned dance in the sand.

Due to an injury, Patricio Quiñones was unable to perform this week, so Milett Figueroa danced with Sergio Álvarez instead.

Running order

Couple	Scores	Dance	Music	Result
Milena & George	33 (8, 8, 9, 8)	Jazz*	"Quimbara" / "On the Floor"—Jennifer Lopez	Sentenced
Cynthia & Jimy	33 (8, 8, 9, 8)	Disco*	"Hush Hush; Hush Hush"—The Pussycat Dolls	—N/a
Milett & Sergio	36 (9, 10, 9, 8)	Tango*	"La Cumparsita"—Gerardo Matos Rodríguez	Safe
Alexander & Isabel	29 (7, 8, 7, 7)	Bollywood	"Şımarık"—Tarkan	Sentenced
Karen & Oreykel	39 (10, 11, 10, 8)	Bollywood	"Jai Ho! (You Are My Destiny)"—A. R. Rahman & The Pussycat Dolls	Safe
Belén & Waldir	38 (9, 9, 11, 9)	Reggaeton	"Impacto"—Daddy Yankee	Safe
Brenda & Kevin	39 (10, 10, 10, 9)	Lambada	"Taboo"—Don Omar	Safe
Lucas & Maru	41 (10, 10, 11, 10)	Lambada	"Balada Boa"—Gusttavo Lima	Best steps

The duel*

- Milena & George: Safe
- Cynthia & Jimy: Eliminated
- Milett & Sergio: Safe

=== Week 6: Trio Salsa ===
The couples (except those sentenced) danced a trio salsa involving an eliminated pro or a member of the troupe. In the versus, only three couples faced dancing belly dance, the winner would take two extra points plus the couples who gave their support votes.

Running order

Couple (Trio Dance Partner)	Scores	Dance	Music	Result
Lucas & Maru (Mauro Caiazza)	34 (8, 9, 9, 8)	Salsa	"No Te Creas Tan Importante"—Josimar Y Su Yambú	Safe
Karen & Oreykel (Carlos Begazo Jr.)	40 (10, 10, 11, 9)	Salsa	"Para Los Rumberos"—El Gran Combo de Puerto Rico	Best steps
Milena & George	35 (9, 9, 9, 8)	Cumbia*	"La Anaconda"—Explosión	—N/a
Alexander & Isabel	28 (7, 7, 7, 7)	Cumbia*	"Viento"—Chacalón / "Elsa"—Bareto	Sentenced
Belén & Waldir (Gian Frank Navarro)	40 (10, 10, 10, 10)	Salsa	"Tú de Qué Vas"—Los 4	Best steps
Milett & Sergio (Jimy García)	35 (9, 9, 9, 8)	Salsa	"Mala Mujer"—Zaperoko	Sentenced
Brenda & Kevin (Juan Tamayo)	42 (11, 11, 10, 10)	Salsa	"Juana Magdalena"—La Charanga Habanera	Best steps

The versus
Couple (Supporters)	Judges' votes	Dance	Music	Result
Karen & Oreykel (Belén, Lucas, Alexander)	Karen, Karen, Karen, Karen	Belly dance	"Ojos Así"—Shakira	Winners (2 pts)
Brenda & Kevin (Milett)	Karen, Karen, Karen, Karen	Belly dance	"Whenever, Wherever"—Shakira	Losers

The duel*

- Milena & George: Eliminated
- Alexander & Isabel: Safe

=== Week 7: Merengue Night ===
The couples (except those sentenced) danced merengue. In the versus, the couples faced dancing different styles. This week none couples were sentenced.

Running order

Couple	Scores	Dance	Music	Result
Alexander & Isabel	28 (6, 8, 7, 7)	Reggaeton*	"Rompe"—Daddy Yankee / / "Gata Fiera"—Trebol Clan	Safe
Milett & Sergio	32 (8, 8, 8, 8)	Rumba flamenca*	"Amor de Mis Amores"—Chico & the Gypsies / "Bamboléo"—Gipsy Kings	Safe
Lucas & Maru	39 (10, 9, 10, 10)	Merengue	"La Cosquillita"—Juan Luis Guerra	Safe
Karen & Oreykel	37 (9, 9, 9, 10)	Merengue	"La Morena"—Oro Solido	Safe
Belén & Waldir	34 (8, 8, 9, 9)	Merengue	"El Baile del Beeper"—Oro Solido	Safe
Brenda & Kevin	40 (11, 8, 11, 10)	Merengue	"El Chicharrón"—Oro Solido	Best steps

The versus
Couple	Judges' votes	Dance	Music	Result
Milett & Sergio	Milett, Milett, Alexander, Alexander (Note: Due to a tie, the judges deliberated to choose the winning couple.)	Strip dance	"Naughty Girl"—Beyoncé	Winners (2 pts)
Alexander & Isabel	Milett, Milett, Alexander, Alexander	Strip dance	"Back in Black"—AC/DC	Losers
Brenda & Kevin	Brenda, Brenda, Brenda, Brenda	Tango	"Tanguera"—Sexteto Mayor	Winners (2 pts)
Lucas & Maru	Brenda, Brenda, Brenda, Brenda	Samba	"Magalenha"—Sérgio Mendes feat. Carlinhos Brown	Losers
Belén & Waldir	Karen, Belén, Belén, Belén	Rumba	"Mi Todo"—Mariah Carey	Winners (2 pts)
Karen & Oreykel	Karen, Belén, Belén, Belén	Rumba	"Eres Todo Para Mí"—Ana Gabriel	Losers

The duel*

- Milett & Sergio: Eliminated (but safe with the lifeguard)
- Alexander & Isabel: Safe

=== Week 8: Acrobatic Night ===
Individual judges' scores in the chart below (given in parentheses) are listed in this order from left to right: Morella Petrozzi, Carlos Cacho, Tilsa Lozano, Jimmy Gamonet de los Heros.

The couples performed one unlearned dance in which they had to perform different acrobatics. In the versus, only three couples faced dancing jazz, the winner would take two extra points plus the couples who gave their support votes.

Due to personal issue, Waldir Felipa was unable to perform this week, so Belén Estévez danced with Gian Frank Navarro instead.

Running order

Couple	Scores	Dance	Music	Result
Karen & Oreykel	28 (7, 8, 8, 5)	Tex-mex	"Techno Cumbia"—Selena	Saved
Lucas & Maru	36 (9, 9, 10, 8)	Rock and roll	"Proud Mary"—Glee Cast	Best steps
Brenda & Kevin	33 (9, 9, 9, 6)	Bachata	"Quiéreme"—Johnny Sky	Safe
Thiago & Yamila	30 (8, 8, 8, 6)	Quebradita	"Juana La Cubana"—Banda Fresnitos	Sentenced
Alexander & Isabel	27 (7, 8, 8, 4)	Disco	"Turn the Beat Around"—Gloria Estefan	Sentenced
Milett & Sergio	31 (8, 9, 8, 6)	Cumbia	"La Culebritica"—Grupo 5	Safe
Belén & Gian Frank	33 (8, 8, 9, 8)	Jazz	"Addicted to You"—Shakira	Safe

The versus
Couple (Supporters)	Judges' votes	Dance	Music	Result
Karen & Oreykel (Lucas)	Karen, Brenda, Karen, Karen	Jazz	"Thriller"—Michael Jackson	Winners (2 pts)
Brenda & Kevin (Belén, Alexander, Thiago, Milett)	Karen, Brenda, Karen, Karen	Jazz	"Billie Jean"—Michael Jackson	Losers

=== Week 9: Trio Cha-cha-cha ===
The couples (except those sentenced) danced trio cha-cha-cha with another celebrity. In the versus, they faced Lucas & Maru against Christian & Isabel (former couple of the show); the winner would take two extra points plus the couples who gave them their support votes.

Running order

Couple (Trio Dance Partner)	Scores	Dance	Music	Result
Lucas & Maru (Dorita Orbegoso)	37 (10, 10, 9, 8)	Cha-cha-cha	"Sway"—The Pussycat Dolls	Safe
Milett & Sergio (Santiago Suárez)	33 (8, 8, 9, 8)	Cha-cha-cha	"Lady Marmalade"—Christina Aguilera, Lil' Kim, Mýa & Pink	Sentenced
Thiago & Yamila	33 (7, 8, 10, 8)	Salsa*	"Muévete" / "Juana Magdalena"—La Charanga Habanera	Sentenced
Alexander & Isabel	28 (6, 7, 8, 7)	Salsa*	"He Sentido Amor"—Josimar y su Yambú / "La Revancha"—Zaperoko	—N/a
Belén & Waldir (Malory Vargas)	43 (11, 11, 11, 10)	Cha-cha-cha	"Dance Again"—Jennifer Lopez feat. Pitbull	Best steps
Karen & Oreykel (Jhoany Vegas)	38 (9, 10, 10, 9)	Cha-cha-cha	"Let's Get Loud"—Jennifer Lopez	Safe
Brenda & Kevin (Luciana Fuster)	38 (9, 10, 10, 9)	Cha-cha-cha	"Telephone"—Lady Gaga feat. Beyoncé	Safe

The versus
Couple (Supporters)	Judges' votes	Dance	Music	Result
Christian & Isabel (Brenda, Belén, Milett)	Lucas, Christian, Lucas, Christian (Note: Due to a tie, the dance director of the show Alfredo Di Natale, gave the decisive vote to choose the winning couple.)	Bachata	"Despacito"—Grupo Extra	Winners (2 pts)
Lucas & Maru (Karen, Alexander, Thiago)	Lucas, Christian, Lucas, Christian	Bachata	"Despacito"—Grupo Extra	Losers

The duel*

- Thiago & Yamila: Safe
- Alexander & Isabel: Eliminated

=== Week 10: Semifinals ===
Individual judges' scores in the chart below (given in parentheses) are listed in this order from left to right: Morella Petrozzi, Carlos Cacho, Tilsa Lozano, Pachi Valle Riestra, Guest Judges.

The couples performed an unlearned dance designed by themselves and a hero dance, which involved only the celebrities dancing side-by-side to the same song and receiving the same set of scores from the judges for the routine.

For the first time in the history of the show, there were three guest judge, Michelle Alexander, Rebeca Escribens and Yola Polastri, all of them scoring couples on a scale of 1 to 10 in each of the routines.

Running order

Couple	Scores (Note: The scores of the invited judges were added. In the first round, the scores were given by Michelle Alexander and Rebeca Escribens. In the heroes dance round, Alexander and Escribens scored the dances along with Yola Polastri.)	Dance	Music	Result
Thiago & Yamila	50 (8, 8, 9, 8, 17)	Reggaeton*	"Mi Gente"—J Balvin feat. Willy William	Sentenced
Milett & Sergio	49 (8, 9, 8, 8, 16)	Jazz*	"Hoy Tengo Ganas de Ti"—Alejandro Fernández feat. Christina Aguilera	—
Karen & Oreykel	56 (10, 9, 9, 9, 19)	Salsa	"Que Rico La Pone"—Chiquito Team Band	Sentenced
Lucas & Maru	62 (10, 10, 10, 10, 22)	Bollywood	"Mix Hindu"—Various Artists	Best steps
Brenda & Kevin	54 (9, 9, 10, 10, 17)	Marinera	"La Concheperla"—Novalima / Guardia Republicana del Perú	Safe
Belén & Waldir	57 (10, 9, 9, 9, 20)	Samba	"Mas que Nada"—Miriam Makeba / "Hip Hip Chin Chin"—Club des Belugas	Safe
Lucas; Karen	67 (9, 10, 11, 9, 28)	Tango	"El Tango de Roxanne"—from Moulin Rouge!	
Milett; Thiago	51 (7, 8, 8, 7, 21)	Reggaeton	"Culipandeo"—DJ Warner / "Dança Do Vampiro"—Axé Bahia	
Belén; Brenda	71 (11, 9, 11, 11, 29)	Salsa	"Aña Pa' Mi Tambor"—La Excelencia	

The duel*

- Thiago & Yamila: Safe
- Milett & Sergio: Eliminated

=== Week 11: Finals ===
In the first part, the couples danced salsa.

In the second part, the four finalist couples danced freestyle.

In the third part, the three finalists couples danced a viennese waltz.

Running order (Part 1)

Couple	Scores	Dance	Music	Result
Lucas & Maru	36 (9, 9, 9, 9)	Salsa	"Vamos Gozando Como Bestias"—Richie Ray & Bobby Cruz	—N/a
Karen & Oreykel	36 (9, 9, 9, 9)	Salsa*	"Quimbara"—Celia Cruz & Johnny Pacheco	Safe
Thiago & Yamila	31 (7, 8, 8, 8)	Salsa*	"Un Verano en Nueva York"—Andy Montañez	Eliminated
Brenda & Kevin	39 (10, 9, 10, 10)	Salsa	"Opao"—Chiquito Team Band	—N/a
Belén & Waldir	39 (10, 9, 10, 10)	Salsa	"Guaguancó In Japan"—José Areas	—N/a

Running order (Part 2)

Couple	Scores	Dance	Music	Result
Karen & Oreykel	36 (9, 9, 9, 9)	Freestyle	"Raíces del Festejo"—Eva Ayllón & Perú Negro	Eliminated
Lucas & Maru	39 (10, 10, 10, 9)	Freestyle	"Escualo"—Astor Piazzolla	Safe
Brenda & Kevin	40 (10, 11, 10, 9)	Freestyle	"The Girl from Ipanema"—Stan Getz & João Gilberto	Safe
Belén & Waldir	36 (10, 8, 9, 9)	Freestyle	"Si Esta Casa Hablara"—Joel Santos	Safe

Running order (Part 3)

Couple	Scores	Dance	Music	Result
Brenda & Kevin	38 (9, 10, 10, 9)	Viennese waltz	"No Me Doy por Vencido"—Luis Fonsi	Winner
Belén & Waldir	37 (9, 10, 9, 9)	Viennese waltz	"La Bella y La Bestia"—David Bisbal & Chenoa	Third place
Lucas & Maru	44 (11, 11, 11, 11)	Viennese waltz	"Como yo te Amo"—Kalimba	Runner-up

== Dance chart ==
The celebrities and professional partners will dance one of these routines for each corresponding week:

- Week 1: Salsa (Salsa Night)
- Week 2: One unlearned dance (World dances)
- Week 3: Bachata (Bachata Under the Rain)
- Week 4: Cumbia & the versus (Cumbia Night)
- Week 5: One unlearned dance (Dances in the Sand)
- Week 6: Trio salsa & the versus (Trio Salsa)
- Week 7: Merengue & the versus (Merengue Night)
- Week 8: One unlearned dance & the versus (Acrobatic Night)
- Week 9: Trio cha-cha-cha & the versus (Trio Cha-cha-cha)
- Week 10: One unlearned dance & heroes dances (Semifinals)
- Week 11: Salsa, favorite dance & viennese waltz (Finals)

Couple	Week 1	Week 2	Week 3	Week 4	Week 5	Week 6	Week 7	Week 8	Week 9	Week 10		Week 11		
Brenda & Kevin	Salsa	Samba	Bachata	Cumbia	Lambada	Salsa	Merengue	Bachata	Cha-cha-cha	Marinera	Salsa	Salsa	Freestyle	Viennese waltz
Lucas & Maru	Salsa	Chacarera	Bachata	Cumbia	Lambada	Salsa	Merengue	Rock and roll	Cha-cha-cha	Bollywood	Tango	Salsa	Freestyle	Viennese waltz
Belén & Waldir	Salsa	Tango	Bachata	Cumbia	Reggaeton	Salsa	Merengue	Jazz	Cha-cha-cha	Samba	Salsa	Salsa	Freestyle	Viennese waltz
Karen & Oreykel	Salsa	Festejo	Bachata	Cumbia	Bollywood	Salsa	Merengue	Tex-mex	Cha-cha-cha	Salsa	Tango	Salsa	Freestyle	
Thiago & Yamila	—N/a							Quebradita	Salsa	Reggaeton	Reggaeton	Salsa		
Milett & Sergio	Salsa	Cumbia	Bachata	Jazz	Tango	Salsa	Rumba flamenca	Cumbia	Cha-cha-cha	Jazz	Reggaeton			
Alexander & Isabel	Salsa	Hopak	Jazz	Huayno	Bollywood	Cumbia	Reggaeton	Jazz	Salsa					
Milena & George	Salsa	Mapalé	Bachata	Cumbia	Jazz	Cumbia								
Cynthia & Jimy	—N/a	Salsa	Bachata	Cumbia	Jazz									
Coto & Yamila	Salsa	Tex-mex	Cumbia	Jazz										

Modalities of competition
Couple	Week 4	Week 6	Week 7	Week 8	Week 9
Brenda & Kevin	Hip-hop	Belly dance	Tango	Jazz	Bachata
Lucas & Maru	Hip-hop	Belly dance	Samba	Jazz	Bachata
Belén & Waldir	Hip-hop	Belly dance	Rumba	Jazz	Bachata
Karen & Oreykel	Hip-hop	Belly dance	Rumba	Jazz	Bachata
Thiago & Yamila	—			Jazz	Bachata
Milett & Sergio	Hip-hop	Belly dance	Strip dance	Jazz	Bachata
Alexander & Isabel	Hip-hop	Belly dance	Strip dance	Jazz	Bachata
Milena & George	Hip-hop				
Cynthia & Jimy	Hip-hop				
Coto & Yamila					

"—" indicates the couple did not dance that week
Highest scoring dance
Lowest scoring dance
Gained bonus points for winning
Gained no bonus points for losing
Danced, but not scored
In Italic indicate the dance performed in the duel

== Guest judges ==
Date	Guest judge	Occupation(s)	Ref.
August 19, 2017	Michelle Alexander	Producer of América Televisión	
August 19, 2017	Rebeca Escribens	Actress & TV host	
August 19, 2017	Yola Polastri	Children's entertainer	
August 26, 2017	Efraín Aguilar	Producer	
August 26, 2017	Joksan Balcázar	Marinera dancer	
August 26, 2017	Sol Carreño	Lawyer & TV host	
August 26, 2017	Denisse Dibós	Actress, dancer, singer & producer	
August 26, 2017	Jimmy Gamonet De Los Heros	Professional dancer & art director	
August 26, 2017	Deklan Guzmán	Professional dancer, choreographer & dance director	
August 26, 2017	Tatiana Izquierdo	Professional dancer, choreographer & dance director	
August 26, 2017	Gina Natteri	Professional dancer & dance director	
August 26, 2017	Mónica Sánchez	Actress	
August 26, 2017	Olga Shimasaki	Professional dancer & dance director	
