= Toby Love (album) =

Studio album by Toby Love
- Released: September 5, 2006; July 17, 2007 (Reloaded)
- Genre: Bachata, R&B
- Label: Sony BMG Norte

Toby Love chronology
Toby Love (2006)	Love Is Back (2008)

Singles from Toby Love
- 1. "Tengo Un Amor" Released: July 18, 2006; 2. "Don't Cry (La Niña Que Soñé)" Released: 2006; 3. "Amores Como El Tuyo" Released: 2007

Reloaded Album Cover
- Toby Love: Reloaded re-edition cover

Singles from Toby Love: Reloaded
- 1. "Don't Cry (La Niña Que Soñé) (Remix)" Released: 2007

Toby Love is the debut studio album by Puerto Rican-American performer Toby Love. It was released on September 5, 2006 by Sony BMG Norte. The album featured collaborations with Puerto Rican rapper Julio Voltio and Puerto Rican duo R.K.M & Ken-Y, among others. Upon release, the album debuted at number twenty-seven on the Billboard Latin Albums chart, number forty-two on the Billboard Heatseekers Albums chart, number three on the Mid-Atlantic area division of the Billboard Heatseekers Albums chart and number eleven on Billboard Latin Rhythm Albums chart. The album spawned three singles, with the lead single, "Tengo Un Amor", becoming a success, in the Latin market, reaching number one in the Billboard Latin Rhythm Airplay chart, the top three of both the Billboard Latin Songs and Billboard Tropical Songs charts, while peaking at number 100 on the Billboard Hot 100 chart in the United States. Toby Love was awarded a Billboard Latin Music Award for "R&B/Hip-Hop Album of the Year". A remix version titled Toby Love: Reloaded was released on July 17, 2007 by Sony Music Entertainment.

== Background ==
Toby Love was born and raised in the Bronx, New York to Puerto Rican parents. He says he fell in love with the genre of bachata, after being exposed to it as a child, explaining that is mother always listened to it. His mother remarried a Dominican and Love was raised around both cultures. He stated that he is a big fan of R&B and found it easy to incorporate it in his music.

After spending six years with the Bachata group Aventura, first appearing on the album Generation Next at the age of 16, Love embarked on his solo career. He met with Aventura while he was still in his merengue group as teenager. Living in the same neighborhood as the group, he became close friends with the member "Mikey", who later asked Love to join.

== Composition ==
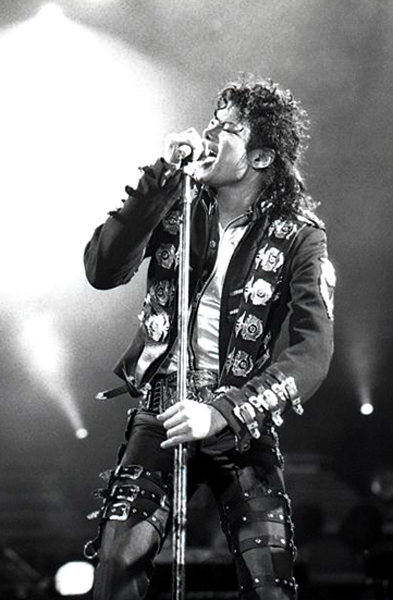
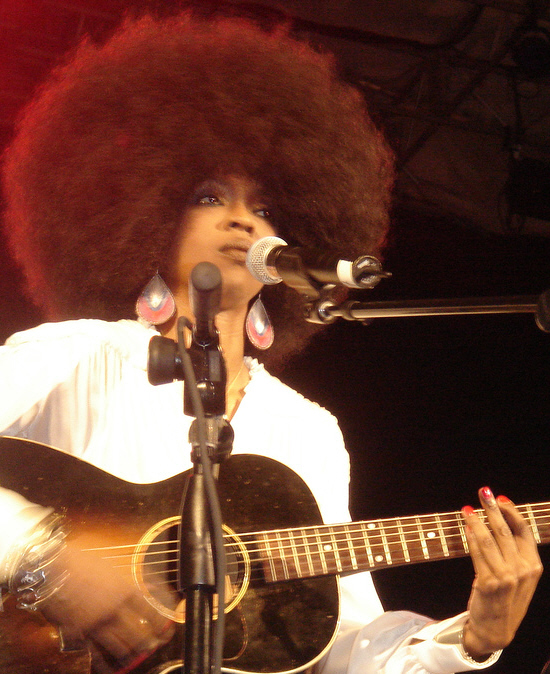
His influential musicians include Michael Jackson and Lauryn Hill (both pictured) which helped combined the mixture of R&B and bachata found on "Tengo Un Amor".

"Tengo Un Amor" was written by Love with additional composition by Edwin Perez who also handled production for the song. The song was written with Spanglish lyrics combining crunk hip hop with bachata. In his review of the parent album, David Jefferies called the song "an incredibly smooth, lush, and glittery ballad", selecting the song as an "Allmusic Pick". Love later called "Tengo Un Amor" the "door-opener" for all of his future success.

His musical influences include Michael Jackson, Lauryn Hill, Juan Luis Guerra and Héctor Lavoe, which helped produce the mixture of R&B and bachata found on "Tengo Un Amor". According to Billboard the original version of the song is a "straightforward bachata song" while the remix with R.K.M & Ken-Y, known then as Rakim & Ken-Y provides "urban street cred". The remix also features a verse by R.K.M where he raps to a rhythm of bachata infused with reggaetón, or bachaton.

== Commercial performance ==
"Tengo Un Amor" was released digitally on November 6, 2006 by Sony BMG Norte. After reaching number three on the Billboard Bubbling Under Hot 100, the song debuted and peaked at #100 of the Billboard Hot 100 chart for the week of November 18, 2006. On the Billboard Hot Latin Tracks chart, the song debuted for the issue week of August 5, 2006 and peaked at number two for the week of November 11, 2006. This gave R.K.M & Ken-Y their third Top 10 single following "Down" and "Me Matas". On the Billboard Latin Tropical Airplay chart, the song debuted for the week of August 19, 2006 and peaked at number three for the week of November 11, 2006. On the Billboard Latin Pop Airplay chart, the song debuted for the week of October 7, 2006 and peaked at #25 for the week of October 28, 2006. In Los Angeles, the song became one of the top five most requested tracks on the Rhythmic Top 40 KXOL (96.3), the Senior Vice President of which called the song a "smash" while citing its success as an acceptance of Hispanic audiences and urban tastes.

== Critical reception ==
Professional ratings
Review scores
Source	Rating
Allmusic	3.0/5 stars

"Tengo Un Amor" received three nominations at the 2007 Latin Billboard Music Awards for Best Vocal Duet or Collaboration and Tropical Airplay Song of the Year, Duo or Group for the remix version while winning the award for Tropical Airplay Song of the Year, New Artist category. He was also awarded Best Rap/Hip-Hop Album for Toby Love. The song was award an ASCAP award for Urban Song of the Year from the American Society of Composers, Authors and Publishers. According to Jon Caramanica of New York Times, "Tengo Un Amor" is Love's "biggest hit".

== Track listing ==
Original
No.	Title	Writer(s)	Producer(s)	Length
1.	"Intro - Who Put This Together"	Octavio Rivera		0:24
2.	"Tengo Un Amor"	Rivera, Gabriel Padilla, Edwin Perez	EZP	4:18
3.	"Playa Fa Sho'"	Rivera		3:18
4.	"Don't Cry (La Niña Que Soñé)"	Rivera		4:05
5.	"Morir Amando"	Rivera		3:46
6.	"Interlude - No Snitchin'"	Rivera		0:57
7.	"We Got It (Cadillac)" (featuring Julio Voltio)	Rivera, Julio Ramos		4:38
8.	"Yo Quiero Saber" (featuring Judy Santos)	Rivera, Judy Santos		3:50
9.	"Celda Fría"	Rivera		4:30
10.	"Stripper Pole" (featuring KP Da Moneymaker)	Rivera		3:36
11.	"Mi Decisión" (featuring Solo 5)	A.B. Quintanilla III, Cruz Martínez, Luigi Giraldo		3:54
12.	"Amores Como El Tuyo"	Rivera		4:38
13.	"Gotta Let You Go"	Rivera		3:42
14.	"Momma's Song"	Rivera		3:16
15.	"Tengo Un Amor" (Remix) (featuring R.K.M & Ken-Y)	Rivera, Padilla, Perez, Kenny Vazquez, José Nieves	EZP	4:20
Total length:				53:13

Reloaded - CD
No.	Title	Writer(s)	Producer(s)	Length
1.	"Tengo Un Amor" (Scarlito R&B Remix) (featuring R.K.M & Ken-Y)	Rivera, Padilla, Perez, Kenny Vazquez, José Nieves	EZP	4:16
2.	"La Mujer Perfecta" (featuring Hector "El Father")			3:17
3.	"Playa Fa Sho'" (Remix) (featuring Magic Juan)	Rivera		3:18
4.	"Don't Cry (La Niña Que Soñe)" (Scarlito Remix) (featuring Alexis & Fido)	Rivera		3:32
5.	"Morir Amando" (Remix) (featuring Fanny Lú)	Rivera		3:46
6.	"We Got It (Cadillac)" (Remix) (featuring Julio Voltio & Vakero)	Rivera, Julio Ramos		4:27
7.	"Interlude"			0:30
8.	"Yo Quiero Saber" (featuring Girlz Talk)	Rivera, Judy Santos		3:50
9.	"Stripper Pole" (Remix) (featuring Pitbull)	Rivera		3:54
10.	"Amores Como El Tuyo" (Remix) (featuring Jorge Celedón)	Rivera		4:38
11.	"Gotta Let You Go" (featuring Max Agende P.I.C.)	Rivera		3:42
Total length:				39:05

Reloaded - DVD
No.	Title	Length
1.	"From Da Barrio To The Billboards"
2.	"Mun2 Vivo"
3.	"Tengo Un Amor" (Music Video)	4:06
4.	"Don't Cry (La Niña Que Soñe)" (Scarlito Remix) (featuring Alexis & Fido) (Music Video)	3:59
5.	"Amores Como El Tuyo" (Music Video)	4:27

== Charts ==
Chart (2006)	Peak Position
US Heatseeker Albums (Billboard)	42
US Heatseeker Albums (Middle Atlantic) (Billboard)	3
US Latin Rhythm Albums (Billboard)	11
US Top Latin Albums (Billboard)	27

== Certifications ==
Region	Certification	Certified units/sales
United States (RIAA)	Platinum (Latin)	60,000^{‡}
^{‡} Sales+streaming figures based on certification alone.
