= Magic Juan =

Magic Juan may refer to:

- Don "Magic" Juan (b. 1950), American rapper and TV personality
- Magic Juan (musician) (b. 1971), American merengue musician
