= Lejos =

Single by Toby Love

from the album Amor Total
- Released: August 21, 2012
- Recorded: 2012
- Genre: Bachata, R&B
- Length: 3:48
- Label: Top Stop Music
- Songwriters: Octavio Rivera, Rafael Martinez, Daniel Santacruz
- Producers: Sergio George, Edwin "EZP" Pérez

Toby Love singles chronology
| "Quizás" (2011) | "Lejos" (2012) | "Todo Mi Amor Eres Tu" (2013) |

Audio sample
- 27 second sample of the song's second verse and beginning of the chorus performed by Toby Love.: file; help

Music video
- "Lejos" on YouTube

"Lejos" (English: "Far") is a song by Puerto Rican-American singer-songwriter Toby Love. It was released on August 21, 2012 by Top Stop Music for his fourth studio album, Amor Total. The song's music video, which was directed by Danny Hastings and produced by Gabriel Guzman, was released on August 14. Commercially, the song was a success, peaking at #36 on the Billboard Latin Songs chart and at #2 on the Billboard Tropical/Salsa chart in the United States while reaching #1 in the Dominican Republic.

== Composition ==
"Lejos" was written by Toby Love along with Rafael Martinez and Daniel Santacruz, and production was handled by multiple Grammy Award winner Sergio George and Edwin "EZP" Pérez. Pérez previously worked with Toby Love on his debut single "Tengo Un Amor" and other artist including Ivy Queen.

== Release and chart performance ==
"Lejos" was released digitally on August 21, 2012 by Top Stop Music. On the Billboard Latin Songs chart, the song debuted the issue week of October 20, 2012. It peaked at #36 for the week of November 17, 2012. On the Billboard Latin Tropical Airplay chart, the song debuted for the week of September 15, 2012. It reached its peak position of #2 for the week of November 17, 2012.

== Reception ==
An editor for the Dominican View praised Love's "striking" voice and the song's "high-quality musical arrangements". According to a press release from the label Love is signed to, Top Stop Music, the song's success established itself as a "game changer" for the genre of urban bachata, for which Toby Love has been called its "greatest interpreter".

== Music video ==
The music video was released on August 14, 2012. It was directed by Danny Hastings and produced by Gabriel Guzman. It co-stars model Sally Ferreira. The music video is set in a bar in the 1920s—1950s and features Love singing to his love interest (Ferreira) until she turns on him and has two guards shoot the place up.

== Charts ==
| Chart (2012) | Position |
|---|---|
| Dominican Republic (Monitor Latino) | 1 |
| US Latin Songs (Billboard) | 36 |
| US Latin Pop Songs (Billboard) | 36 |
| US Tropical Songs (Billboard) | 2 |
| Venezuela (Record Report) | 81 |
