= Love Is Back (Toby Love album) =

Studio album by Toby Love
- Released: July 21, 2008
- Recorded: 2006–2008
- Genre: Bachata, R&B
- Label: Sony BMG Norte

Toby Love chronology
Toby Love (2006)	Love Is Back (2008)	La Voz De La Juventud (2011)

Singles from Love Is Back
- 1. "Llorar Lloviendo" Released: May 20, 2008; 2. "Amor Primero" Released: 2008

Love Is Back is the second studio album from the bachata singer Toby Love, launched on July 21st 2008 through Sony BMG Norte. Just like his first album, he mixes bachata with R&B. He also mixes it with crunk hip hop, calling it Crunkchata. Its lead single, "Llorar Lloviendo", peaked at number 7 on the Billboard Latin Rhythm Airplay chart and number 2 on the Billboard Tropical Airplay chart.

== Track listing ==
No.	Title	Length
1.	"Intro WLUV Morning Show"	0:32
2.	"Llorar Lloviendo"	3:45
3.	"Happy Valentine's"	3:22
4.	"Tú & Yo"	3:30
5.	"Amor Primero"	3:47
6.	"Atrapado"	4:07
7.	"Rum and Coke" (featuring BHaze)	3:21
8.	"Interlude WLUV Interview / Call In"	2:02
9.	"Glamorous Girl"	3:12
10.	"Sex With My Ex" (featuring Magic Juan)	3:38
11.	"Get Up" (featuring Sopranito)	3:12
12.	"Como Tú"	3:30
13.	"Shame Girl"	3:24
14.	"Irreplaceable"	4:15
15.	"Interlude WLUV (Miti Miti)"	0:58
16.	"Dímelo"	3:32
Total length:		50:15

iTunes Bonus Track
No.	Title	Length
17.	"Llorar Lloviendo (Pokerface Remix)"	4:06
Total length:		54:21

== Charts ==
Chart (2008)	Peak Position
US Heatseeker Albums (Billboard)	47
US Top Latin Albums (Billboard)	36
US Tropical Albums (Billboard)	3
