= 2007 Latin Billboard Music Awards =

Annual American music awards ceremony

2007 Billboard Latin Music Awards
- Date: April 26, 2007
- Venue: BankUnited Center, University of Miami, Coral Gables, Florida

The Billboard Latin Music Awards grew out of the Billboard Music Awards program from Billboard Magazine, an industry publication charting the sales and radio airplay success of musical recordings. Originally launched as the Billboard Latin Music Conference in 1990, the first awards began in 1994. In addition to awards given on the basis of success on the Billboard charts, the ceremony includes the Spirit of Hope award for humanitarian achievements and the Lifetime Achievement award, as well as awards by the broadcasting partner.

Since 1999, the awards ceremony has been broadcast on the television network Telemundo, where it became the network's highest-rated music special. The broadcast not only extends throughout the Americas and Puerto Rico, but also to such countries as Romania.

== Hot Latin Songs of the Year ==
=== Hot Latin Song of the Year ===
- Aliado Del Tiempo - Mariano Barba
- Down - R.K.M & Ken-Y
- Mas Alla Del Sol - Joan Sebastian
- Hips Don't Lie - Shakira Featuring Wyclef Jean

=== Vocal Duet or Collaboration ===
- Tengo Un Amor - Toby Love Featuring R.K.M & Ken-Y
- Tu Recuerdo - Ricky Martin Featuring La Mari
- Hips Don't Lie - Shakira Featuring Wyclef Jean
- Noche De Sexo - Wisin & Yandel Featuring Aventura

=== Artist of the Year ===
- Aventura
- Daddy Yankee
- R.K.M & Ken-Y
- Wisin & Yandel

== Latin Pop Albums ==
=== Male ===
- Amor - Andrea Bocelli
- MTV Unplugged - Ricky Martin
- Navidades - Luis Miguel
- Trozos de Mi Alma, Vol. 2 - Marco Antonio Solís

=== Female ===
- Dos Amores Un Amante - Ana Gabriel
- Ananda - Paulina Rubio
- Limón y Sal - Julieta Venegas
- La Voz de un Ángel - Yuridia

=== Duo or Group ===
- Ayer Fue Kumbia Kings, Hoy Es Kumbia All Starz - A.B. Quintanilla III Presents Kumbia All Starz
- Celestial - RBD
- Live In Hollywood - RBD
- En Presencia Del Futuro - Voz A Voz

=== New Artist ===
- Así Soy Yo - Anaís
- En Presencia Del Futuro - Voz A Voz
- Habla El Corazón - Yuridia
- La Voz de un Ángel - Yuridia

== Top Latin Albums Artist of the Year ==
- Daddy Yankee
- Don Omar
- Maná
- RBD

== Latin Rock/Alternative Album of the Year ==
- Pa´fuera Telarañas - Bebe
- Dulce Beat - Belanova
- Pescado Original - Los Enanitos Verdes
- Amar es Combatir - Maná

== Tropical Album of the Year ==
=== Male ===
- Decisión Unánime - Víctor Manuelle
- Salsa Con Reggaeton - Andy Montañez
- Directo Al Corazon - Gilberto Santa Rosa
- Back To Da Barrio - Michael Stuart

=== Female ===
- Libre - Gisselle
- Pura Salsa - La India
- Soy Diferente - La India
- Soy Como Tu - Olga Tañón

=== Duo or Group ===
- K.O.B. Live - Aventura
- Arroz con Habichuela - El Gran Combo de Puerto Rico
- Realtime - Limi-T 21
- Haciendo Historia - Xtreme

=== New Artist ===
- Corazon - Fonseca
- Mi Sueño - Marlon
- Trova Con Salsa Pa'l Bailador - Sanabria

== Regional Mexican Album of the Year ==
=== Male Solo Artist ===
- Enamorado - Pepe Aguilar
- Vencedor - Valentín Elizalde
- La Tragedia Del Vaquero - Vicente Fernández
- Mas Alla Del Sol - Joan Sebastian

=== Male Duo Or Group ===
- Crossroads: Cruce de Caminos - Intocable
- Borron Y Cuenta Nueva - Grupo Montéz de Durango
- Algo De Mi - Conjunto Primavera
- Historias Que Contar - Los Tigres del Norte

=== Female Group or Female Solo Artist ===
- Rancherisimas Con Banda - Graciela Beltrán
- La Reina Canta A Mexico - Ana Gabriel
- Desatados - Los Horóscopos de Durango
- Orgullo De Mujer - Alicia Villarreal

=== New Artist ===
- Aliado Del Tiempo - Mariano Barba
- El Grupo Libra - El Grupo Libra
- La Produccion Maestra 2006 - Banda Pequeños Musical
- Tierra Cali - Tierra Cali

== Latin Pop Airplay Song of the Year ==
=== Male ===
- A Ti - Ricardo Arjona
- No Se Por Que - Chayanne
- Te Mando Flores - Fonseca
- Lo Que Me Gusta a Mí - Juanes

=== Female ===
- Lo Que Son Las Cosas - Anaís
- Volverte A Amar - Alejandra Guzmán
- Como Duele (Barrera De Amor) - Noelia
- Ni Una Sola Palabra - Paulina Rubio

=== Duo or Group ===
- Labios Compartidos - Maná
- Tu Recuerdo - Ricky Martin Featuring La Mari
- Hips Don't Lie - Shakira Featuring Wyclef Jean
- Que Me Alcance La Vida - Sin Bandera

=== New Artist ===
- Lo Que Son Las Cosas - Anaís
- Abrazame - Camila
- Te Mando Flores - Fonseca
- Uno Y Uno Es Igual A Tres - Jeremíasj

== Tropical Airplay Song of the Year ==
=== Male ===
- Que Precio Tiene El Cielo - Marc Anthony
- Nuestro Amor Se Ha Vuelto Ayer - Víctor Manuelle
- Princesa - Frank Reyes
- Vale La Pena - Yoskar Sarante

=== Female ===
- Lo Que Son Las Cosas [salsa version] - Anaís
- Lagrimas - La India
- Solamente Una Noche - La India
- Desilusioname - Olga Tañón

=== Duo or Group ===
- Los Infieles - Aventura
- Tengo Un Amor - Toby Love Featuring R.K.M & Ken-Y
- No Es Una Novela - Monchy & Alexandra
- Los Hombres Tienen La Culpa - Gilberto Santa Rosa & Don Omar

=== New Artist ===
- Te Mando Flores - Fonseca
- Ay Amor, Cuando Hablan Las Miradas - Guayacan
- Tengo Un Amor - Toby Love
- Usted Abuso - Marlon

== Regional Mexican Airplay Song of the Year ==
=== Male Solo Artist ===
- Aliado Del Tiempo - Mariano Barba
- Para Que Regreses - El Chapo de Sinaloa
- Que Lastima - Alfredo Ramirez Corral
- Mas Alla Del Sol - Joan Sebastian

=== Male Group ===
- De Rodillas Te Pido - Alegres De La Sierra
- Te Compro - Duelo
- Que Vuelva - Grupo Montéz de Durango
- Algo De Mi - Conjunto Primavera

=== Female Group or Female Solo Artist ===
- Mi Amor Por Ti - Los Horóscopos de Durango
- Como Una Mariposa - Diana Reyes
- Besos Y Copas - Jenni Rivera
- De Contrabando - Jenni Rivera

=== New Artist ===
- Aliado Del Tiempo - Mariano Barba
- Masacre En El Cajoncito - Los Nuevos Rebeldes
- Reencuentro - Banda Pequeños Musical
- Que Lastima - Alfredo Ramirez Corral

== Latin Tour of the Year ==
- Vicente Fernández
- Luis Miguel
- RBD
- Shakira

== Reggaeton ==
=== Album of the Year ===
- Calle 13 - Calle 13
- King of Kings - Don Omar
- Mas Flow: Los Benjamins - Luny Tunes & Tainy
- Masterpiece - R.K.M & Ken-Y

=== Song of the Year ===
- Machucando - Daddy Yankee
- Down - R.K.M & Ken-Y
- Caile - Tito "El Bambino"
- Pam Pam - Wisin & Yandel

== Other Latin ==
=== Latin Ringtone of the Year ===
- Y Todo Para Que - Intocable
- Labios Compartidos - Maná
- Down - R.K.M & Ken-Y
- Rakata - Wisin & Yandel

=== Latin Dance Club Play Track of the Year ===
- Cha Cha (Dance Remixes) - Chelo
- Just For One Night/Solamente Una Noche (Dance Remixes) - La India
- Mas Que Nada (Dance Remixes) - Sérgio Mendes Featuring The Black Eyed Peas
- Un Alma Sentenciada (Dance Remixes) - Thalía

=== Latin Rap/Hip-Hop Album of the Year ===
- E.S.L. - Akwid
- Still Kickin' It - Akwid & Jae-P
- Pa Mi Raza - Jae-P
- Toby Love - Toby Love

=== Latin Greatest Hits Album of the Year ===
- Sigo Siendo Yo - Marc Anthony
- 30 Recuerdos - Los Bukis
- Amor Eterno: Los Exitos* - Rocío Dúrcal
- La Historia Del Divo - Juan Gabriel

=== Latin Compilation Album of the Year ===
- Now Latino - Various Artists
- Now Latino 2 - Various Artists
- Roc-La-Familia And Héctor el Father Present: Los Rompediscotekas - Various Artists
- WY Records Presents: Los Vaqueros - Various Artists

=== Latin Jazz Album of the Year ===
- Around The City - Eliane Elias
- Solo - Gonzalo Rubalcaba
- Dances, Prayers, and Meditations For Peace - Nestor Torres

=== Latin Christian/Gospel Album of the Year ===
- The Shadow Of Your Wings: Hymns And Sacred Songs - Fernando Ortega
- Dismiss The Mystery - Salvador
- On My Knees: The Best Of Jaci Velasquez - Jaci Velasquez
- Alegria - Marcos Witt

== Songwriter of the Year ==
- Mariano Barba
- Anthony "Romeo" Santos
- Joan Sebastian
- Marco Antonio Solís
- Anthony López

== Producer of the Year ==
- Armando Avila
- Cachorro Lopez
- Luny Tunes
- Nely

== Production and Labels ==
=== Publisher of the Year ===
- EMI April, ASCAP
- EMI Blackwood, BMI
- Sony/ATV Discos, ASCAP
- Universal-Musica Unica, BMI

=== Publishing Corporation of the Year ===
- EMI Music Publishing
- Sony/ATV Music Publishing
- Universal Music Publishing
- Warner/Chappell Music Publishing

=== Hot Latin Songs Label of the Year ===
- EMI Televisa
- Machete
- Sony BMG Norte
- Universal Latino

=== Top Latin Albums Label of the Year ===
- EMI Televisa
- Machete
- Sony BMG Norte
- Univision Music Group

=== Latin Pop Airplay Label of the Year ===
- EMI Televisa
- Sony BMG Norte
- Universal Latino
- Warner Latina

=== Tropical Airplay Label of the Year ===
- J&N
- Machete
- Sony BMG Norte
- Univision

=== Regional Mexican Airplay Label of the Year ===
- Disa
- Fonovisa
- Universal Latino
- Univision

=== Latin Rhythm Airplay Label of the Year: (new category) ===
- Machete
- Sony BMG Norte
- Universal Latino
- Univision

==== Latin Pop Albums Label of the Year ====
- Sony BMG Norte

==== Tropical Albums Label of the Year ====
- Sony BMG Norte

==== Regional Mexican Albums Label of the Year ====
- Univision Music Group

==== Latin Rhythm Albums Label of the Year ====
- Machete

== Billboard Lifetime Achievement Award ==
- Miguel Bosé

== Billboard Spirit Of Hope Award ==
- Ricardo Montaner
