= La Voz De La Juventud =

Studio album by Toby Love
- Released: May 10, 2011
- Recorded: 2010–2011
- Genre: Bachata, R&B
- Label: Sony Music Latin

Toby Love chronology
Love Is Back (2008)	La Voz De La Juventud (2011)	Mis Favoritas (2012)

Singles from La Voz De La Juventud
- 1. "Te Parece Poco" Released: July 26, 2010; 2. "Casi Casi" Released: January 9, 2011; 3. "Quizás" Released: February 14, 2011

La Voz De La Juventud (The Voice of Youth) is the third studio album by Urban Bachata artist Toby Love released in 2011 through Sony Music Latin.

== Track listing ==
No.	Title	Length
1.	"Intro"	1:55
2.	"Te Parece Poco"	4:11
3.	"Lamento Prohibido"	3:57
4.	"Pa' Qué"	4:29
5.	"Casi Casi"	3:42
6.	"Y Ahora"	3:55
7.	"Quizás" (featuring Yuridia)	4:29
8.	"Como Te Amo"	3:32
9.	"Eres Tú"	3:50
10.	"Rompiendo En Frío"	3:40
11.	"Como Dos Fugitivos" (featuring Del Blokke)	3:44
12.	"No Sé Si Volverás"	4:04
13.	"Corazón"	3:25
Total length:		48:54

15 Tracks Version
No.	Title	Length
14.	"Intentarlo Otra Vez"	3:53
15.	"Agridulce"	3:35
Total length:		56:22

== Charts ==
Chart (2011)	Peak Position
US Heatseeker Albums (Billboard)	49
US Top Latin Albums (Billboard)	31
US Tropical Albums (Billboard)	3
