= Amor Total =

Studio album by Toby Love
- Released: May 7, 2013
- Recorded: 2012–2013
- Genre: Bachata, R&B
- Label: Top Stop Music

Toby Love chronology
| Mis Favoritas (2012) | Amor Total (2013) | Bachata Nation (2016) |

Singles from Amor Total
- 1. "Lejos" Released: August 21, 2012; 2. "Todo Mí Amor Eres Tú" Released: April 5, 2013; 3. "Hey" Released: 2014

Amor Total (Total Love) is the fourth studio album by Puerto Rican-American Bachata artist Toby Love released in 2014 through Top Stop Music.

== Track listing ==
| No. | Title | Length |
|---|---|---|
| 1. | "Todo Mí Amor Eres Tú (I Just Can't Stop Loving You)" | 3:36 |
| 2. | "Lejos" | 3:50 |
| 3. | "Hey" | 3:11 |
| 4. | "That Girl Is Mine" (feat. Dynasty) | 3:16 |
| 5. | "Mi Reina" | 3:36 |
| 6. | "Na Na Na" | 3:18 |
| 7. | "Sin Una Palabra" | 3:41 |
| 8. | "Luna Llena" | 3:55 |
| 9. | "Nueva York" | 3:49 |
| 10. | "Hold Ya" | 3:18 |
| 11. | "Y Volveré" | 2:45 |
| 12. | "Buscando Una Nena" | 3:24 |
| Total length: | | 41:36 |

Deluxe Edition
| No. | Title | Length |
|---|---|---|
| 13. | "La Recaída" | 3:30 |
| Total length: | | 45:06 |

== Charts ==
| Chart (2013) | Peak Position |
|---|---|
| US Top Latin Albums (Billboard) | 65 |
| US Tropical Albums (Billboard) | 7 |
