= Bachata Nation =

Studio album by Toby Love
- Released: June 24, 2016
- Recorded: 2014–2016
- Genre: Bachata, R&B
- Label: Elegant Records

Toby Love chronology
Amor Total (2013)	Bachata Nation (2016)

Singles from Bachata Nation
- 1. "El Aire Que Respiro" Released: May 27, 2014; 2. "We Never Looking Back" Released: April 13, 2015; 3. "Vestida De Blanco" Released: May 5, 2015; 4. "No Le Eches La Culpa" Released: June 3, 2016

Bachata Nation is the fifth studio album by The Bronx born Bachata artist Toby Love released in 2016 through Top Stop Music. This album included 4 singles that reached the top of the Billboard Tropical Airplay chart. The song "El Aire Que Respiro" peaked at #8 while the songs "We Never Looking Back" featuring French Montana, "Vestida De Blanco", and "No Le Eches La Culpa" peaked at #1.

== Track listing ==
No.	Title	Length
1.	"A New Year" (Skit)	2:11
2.	"We Never Looking Back" (featuring French Montana)	3:56
3.	"El Aire Que Respiro"	3:52
4.	"No Hay Colores" (featuring Judy Santos)	3:42
5.	"I Just Called"	4:05
6.	"Love Airlines" (Skit)	0:35
7.	"Mi Verano Love" (featuring Fuego)	3:18
8.	"Vestida De Blanco"	3:54
9.	"Amaneciendo"	3:10
10.	"Loquito"	5:37
11.	"Abrakadabra"	3:57
12.	"No Le Eches La Culpa"	2:59
13.	"Entra En Mi Vida" (featuring Karlos Rosé)	3:42
14.	"Faith" (Interlude)	1:34
15.	"Ella Es"	3:12
16.	"Sonando"	3:28
17.	"Una Copa Dos Mujeres"	4:46
Total length:		57:57

== Charts ==
Chart (2016)	Peak Position
US Top Latin Albums (Billboard)	5
US Tropical Albums (Billboard)	1
