= Llorar Lloviendo =

Single by Toby Love

from the album Love Is Back
- Released: May 20, 2008
- Recorded: 2008
- Genre: Bachata; R&B
- Length: 3:45
- Label: Sony BMG Note
- Songwriters: Octavio Rivera; Edwin Pérez; Anthony López; Gabriel Padilla
- Producers: Edwin "EZP" Pérez; Tony CJ

Toby Love singles chronology
"Amores Como El Tuyo" (2007)	"Llorar Lloviendo" (2008)	"Amor Primero" (2008)

Music video
- "Llorar Lloviendo" on YouTube

"Llorar Lloviendo" (English: "Cry Raining") is a song by Puerto Rican-American singer and songwriter Toby Love. It was released on May 20, 2008, by Sony BMG Norte as the first single for Love's second studio album, Love Is Back (2008). Different remixes of the song were made with Bachata group Marcy Place, Periel & Jakziel (as an urban pop version), and one referred to as the Pokerface remix.

== Charts ==
Chart (2006)	Peak position
US Hot Latin Songs (Billboard)	22
US Latin Airplay (Billboard)	25
US Latin Pop Airplay (Billboard)	36
US Latin Rhythm Airplay (Billboard)	7
US Tropical Airplay (Billboard)	2

== Certifications ==
Region	Certification	Certified units/sales
United States (RIAA)	Gold (Latin)	30,000^{‡}
^{‡} Sales+streaming figures based on certification alone.
