= Toby Love =

American singer

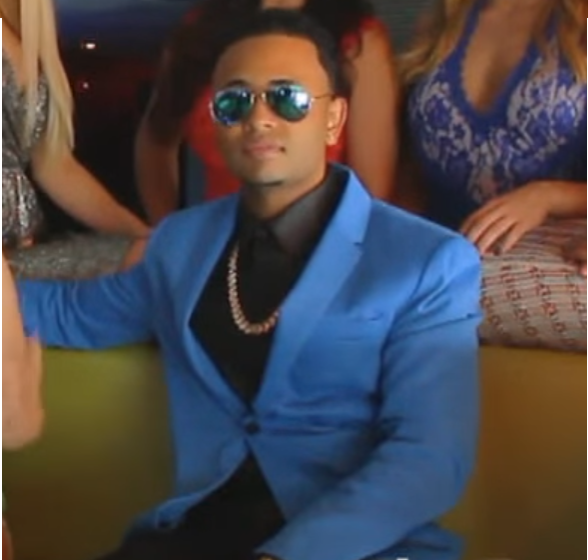
- Toby Love in 2015

Background information
- Also known as: Soul Love
- Born: Octavio Rivera; March 20, 1985 (age 41); The Bronx, New York, U.S.
- Genres: Bachata; Latin pop; R&B; hip hop; Christian music (currently)
- Occupation: Singer
- Instrument: Vocals
- Years active: 1999–present
- Labels: Premium Latin Music; Sony Music; Top Stop Music; Elegant Records

Toby Love (born Octavio Rivera; March 20, 1985) is an American singer. Based on The Bronx, New York, he is best known for being a former member of Aventura before pursuing a solo career, later performing a style of bachata music that combines traditional and urban singing and production. In 2006, he embarked on a solo career, thus gaining success. His debut single, "Tengo Un Amor", helped him rise to fame in mainstream Latin music. Since then, he became one of the most successful bachata artists of the 2000s and 2010s with hits like "Llorar Lloviendo", "Te Parece Poco", "Lejos", "Vestida De Blanco", among others.

== Early life ==
Toby Love was born in The Bronx, New York on March 20, 1985, to Puerto Rican parents. Coming from a musical family, he grew up listening to a bunch of different music genres, such as pop, hip-hop, R&B, bachata, merengue, and salsa. His biological father Toby Rivera sang with the salsa orchestral group Conjunto Clásico. His mother was later remarried to a Dominican man, which eventually led to Toby Love's exposure around both Dominican and Puerto Rican cultures. Being exposed to bachata, he decided to pursue a career in music in that genre. He lived in the same neighborhood as the bachata group Aventura. He became close friends with the member Mikey, who later asked Love to join the group.

== Career ==
=== Working with Aventura (1999–2005) ===
Max, offered Love the opportunity to work with Aventura and he accepted. He started working with the group in 1999 as a backup vocalist and additional percussionist. His voice was featured in the groups second album, We Broke the Rules, for the songs "I Believe (Yo Creo)", "Mi Puerto Rico", and "Gone", which is a bachata cover of an NSYNC's song.

=== Becoming his own artist, Debut album, and Love is Back (2006–2009) ===
In 2006, Love left the group to embark on his own career as an artist. He signed with Sony Music and released the first single of his first album "Tengo Un Amor" on July 18, 2006. On the Billboard charts, it peaked at number 100 on the Billboard Hot 100, at number 2 on the Hot Latin Songs chart, and at number 1 on the Latin Rhythm Airplay chart. It was certified 2× Platinum in the U.S. by the Recording Industry Association of America (RIAA) He released his debut LP and self-titled album Toby Love on September 5, 2006, under the record labels Sony BMG and Scarlito. It featured collaborations with Judy Santos, Julio Voltio, and Rakim & Ken-Y. The album also featured the singles "Don't Cry (La Niña Que Soñé)" and "Amores Como El Tuyo". The album was certified Platinum in the U.S. by the Recording Industry Association of America (RIAA). In 2007, he received four nominations to the Billboard Latin Music Awards for songs included in his debut album. Love won awards for two categories, Tropical Airplay Song of the Year for the debut single, and Latin Rap / Hip Hop Album of the Year for the debut album.

On July 17, 2007, he released a remix version of the album titled Toby Love: Reloaded. It featured collaborations with Max Agende, Jorge Celedón, Magic Juan, Vakero, Fanny Lú, Alexis & Fido, and Pitbull, along with the artists from the original version of the album. In the same year, he was featured in Tito El Bambino's song "La Busco", for Bambino's second studio solo album, It's My Time. The music video was released in 2008.

On May 20, 2008, he released the first single for his second album, "Llorar Lloviendo". On the Billboard charts, it peaked at number 22 on the Hot Latin Songs chart, at number 7 on the Latin Rhythm Airplay chart, and at number 2 on the Tropical Airplay. The single was certified Gold in the U.S. by the Recording Industry Association of America (RIAA). On July 21, 2008, he released Love Is Back. It included the single "Amor Primero". The album featured collaborations with BHaze, Sopranito, and Magic Juan. It peaked at number 3 on the Billboard Tropical Albums chart.

=== La Voz De La Juventud, Amor Total, Bachata Nation (2010–2017) ===
On July 26, 2010, he released the first single for his third studio album "Te Parece Poco". On January 9, 2011, he released the second single "Casi Casi". It peaked at number 31 on the Billboard Latin Pop Airplay chart. On February 14, 2011, he released its third single "Quizás" and featured Mexican singer Yuridia. All 3 singles peaked at number 15 on the Billboard Tropical Airplay chart. On May 10, 2011, he released his third studio album La Voz De La Juventud. It featured collaborations with Del Blokke and Yuridia. It peaked at number 3 on the Billboard Tropical Albums chart. On March 19, 2012, he released his first and only compilation album Mis Favoritos. It was released by Sony Music Latin as part of a series of compilation albums involving other famous and successful artists. This would be the last album with Sony Music as Love would no longer be part of the company as of late 2012.

In 2012, he signed with Sergio George's Top Stop Music. He released the music video for his first single under the new label titled Lejos as the main single for his fourth studio album on February 21, 2012. The audio-only version was released on August 21, 2012. It peaked at number 2 on the Billboard Tropical Airplay chart. Its second singled peaked at number 1 on the same chart. It was a Spanglish bachata cover of Michael Jackson's 1987 single, I Just Can't Stop Loving You. Jackson has a Spanish version titled "Todo Mi Amor Eres Tu" ("All My Love Is You"), which is the title of Love's cover of the song. Love titled it as "Todo Mi Amor Eres Tu (I Just Can't Stop Loving You)" and the music video was released on April 2, 2013. The audio only version was released on April 5, 2013, on iTunes and on every other streaming platform on April 8, 2013. On May 7, 2013, he released his fourth studio album Amor Total. It featured a collaboration with Reggae artist Dynasty. It peaked at number 7 on the Billboard Tropical Albums chart. The album also featured the song "Hay", which was later released as a single in 2014.

On May 27, 2014, he released the first single for his fifth studio album, "El Aire Que Respiro". It peaked at number 8 on the Billboard Tropical Airplay chart. The next three singles all peaked at number one on the same chart. The second single, "We Never Looking Back", was released in 2015 and featured Moroccan-American rapper French Montana. The third single, "Vestida De Blanco", was released on July 1, 2015. On June 3, 2016, he released the fourth single "No Le Eches La Culpa". On June 24, 2016, he released his fifth studio album Bachata Nation. It featured collaborations with Karlos Rosé, Fuego, Judy Santos, French Montana. On the Billboard charts, it peaked at number 5 on Top Latin Albums chart, and at number 1 on the Tropical Albums chart.

=== More singles and conversion to Christianity (2018–present) ===
Love had continued to release more singles between 2018 and 2020. On July 2, 2021, he released his first Christian single titled "Jesus Te Amo" (Jesus I Love You). He was going under the name Tobiah.

== Artistry ==
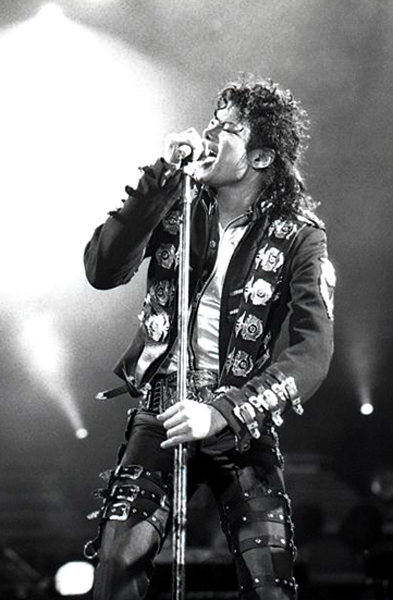
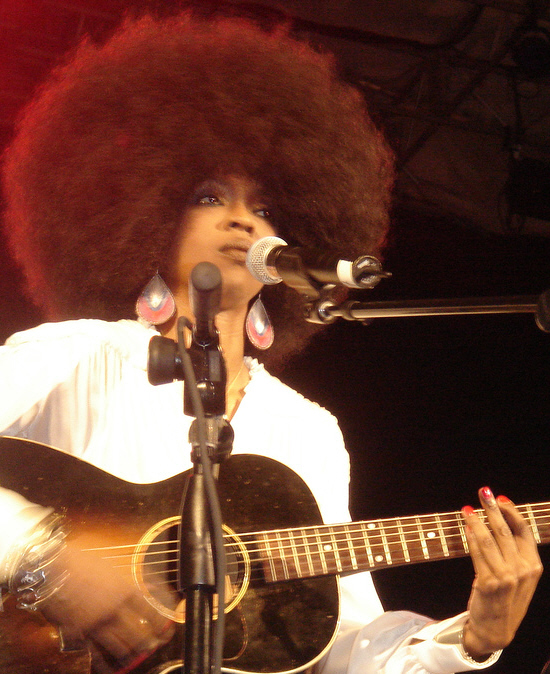
His influential musicians include Michael Jackson and Lauryn Hill, amongst many others.

His musical influences include Michael Jackson, R. Kelly, Lauryn Hill, Pitbull, Antony Santos, Juan Luis Guerra, Héctor Lavoe, and Ricky Martin, which had inspired Love to produce the mixture of Latin pop and R&B into bachata in his songs. He was also inspired by Crunk, a hip-hop music subgenre while recording half of his debut album in Miami. Love became a fan of Crunk Hip-Hop music. He incorporated it into his bachata music, thus creating the subgenre Crunkchata. Love produces the majority of the music used in his albums, along with co-producer Eddie Perez.

== Legacy ==
Toby Love is recognized as the artist who made the subgenre of crunkchata popular. His eponymous debut studio album is the only bachata album ever to be awarded Latin Rap/Hip-Hop Album of the Year at the 2007 Latin Billboard Music Awards. His debut single "Tengo Un Amor", was his most successful song and elevated him to stardom. Since then he has released more hits, including 5 number 1 singles on the Billboard Tropical Airplay chart. He was dubbed as La Voz de la Juventud (The Voice of the Youth).

== Personal life ==
Love currently resides in New Jersey with his wife Rebecca, and his three kids Timothy, Noah, and Riley Rivera. He now works on Christian music projects and is the music director of his church. He often spends time in New York with his extended family.

== Discography ==
Studio albums

- Toby Love (Sony BMG, 2006)
- Love Is Back (Sony BMG, 2008)
- La Voz De La Juventud (Sony Music, 2011)
- Amor Total (Top Stop Music, 2013)
- Bachata Nation (Elegant Records, 2016)

Compilation albums

- Mis Favoritas (Sony Music, 2012)

=== Singles ===
| Year | Single | Chart positions | | | | Album | Certifications |
| Year | Single | US | U.S. Latin | U.S. Latin Trop | U.S. Latin Pop | Album | Certifications |
|---|---|---|---|---|---|---|---|
| 2006 | "Tengo Un Amor" | 100 | 2 | 3 | 25 | Toby Love | • U.S. RIAA certification: 2× Platinum |
| 2006 | "Don't Cry (La Niña Que Soñé)" | — | 13 | 22 | — | Toby Love | |
| 2007 | "Amores Como El Tuyo" | — | — | — | — | Toby Love | |
| 2008 | "Llorar Lloviendo" | — | 22 | 2 | 36 | Love is Back | • U.S. RIAA certification: Gold |
| 2008 | "Amor Primero" | — | — | — | — | Love is Back | |
| 2010 | "Te Parece Poco" | — | — | 15 | — | La Voz de la Juventud | |
| 2011 | "Casi Casi" | — | — | 15 | 31 | La Voz de la Juventud | |
| 2011 | "Quizás" (featuring Yuridia) | — | — | 15 | — | La Voz de la Juventud | |
| 2012 | "Lejos" | — | 36 | 2 | 36 | Amor Total | |
| 2013 | "Todo Mí Amor Eres Tú" | — | 29 | 1 | 17 | Amor Total | |
| 2014 | "Hey" | — | 43 | 1 | 37 | Amor Total | |
| 2014 | "El Aire Que Respiro" | — | — | 8 | — | Bachata Nation | |
| 2015 | "We Never Looking Back (feat. French Montana)" | — | — | 1 | — | Bachata Nation | |
| 2015 | "Vestida De Blanco" | — | — | 1 | — | Bachata Nation | |
| 2016 | "No Le Eches La Culpa" | — | — | 1 | — | Bachata Nation | |

=== Featurings ===
- Tito El Bambino : La Busco
- Alexis & Fido - Soy Igual Que Tu
- Chosen Few Movement - Grind It Up (featuring Toby Love & Lumidee)
- Omega - Tu No Ta Pa Mi (Remix)
- Magic Juan - La Otra Noche
- Aventura - I Believe (Yo Creo) & Gone
- Javi G - Por Qué? (Toby Love y Mikey)
- Tony CJ - Mi Primer Amor (Salsa Version)
- Fanny Lu - Y Si Te Digo (Bachata, 2007)
