= Tengo Un Amor =

Single by Toby Love

from the album Toby Love
- Released: July 18, 2006
- Recorded: 2006
- Genre: Bachata; R&B
- Length: 4:18
- Label: Sony BMG Note
- Songwriters: Octavio Rivera; Edwin Pérez; Anthony López; Gabriel Padilla
- Producers: Edwin "EZP" Pérez; Tony CJ

Toby Love singles chronology
"Tengo Un Amor" (2006)	"Don't Cry" (2006)

Audio sample
- 25 second sample of the English intro and first verse of the song by Toby Love.: file; help

Music video
- "Tengo Un Amor" on YouTube

"Tengo Un Amor" (English: "I Have One Love") is the debut single by Puerto Rican-American singer and songwriter Toby Love from his self-titled debut studio album. It was released on July 18, 2006 by Sony BMG Norte. A remix version with R.K.M & Ken-Y was also recorded and included on the album. After separating from the bachata group Aventura in 2006, Toby Love set out on his own to record his debut album. The song became a success in the Latin market, reaching number one in the Billboard Latin Rhythm Airplay chart, the top five of both the Billboard Hot Latin Tracks and Billboard Latin Tropical Airplay charts while peaking at number 100 on the Billboard Hot 100 chart in the United States.

== Background ==
Toby Love was born and raised in the Bronx, New York to Puerto Rican parents. He has said that he fell in love with the genre of bachata after being exposed to it as a child. He explained that his mother had always listened to that type of music. His mother had remarried to a Dominican and Love was raised around both cultures. He stated that he is a big fan of R&B and found it easy to incorporate it in his music.

After spending six years with the bachata group Aventura, first appearing on the album Generation Next at the age of 16, Love embarked on his solo career. He met with Aventura while he was still in a merengue group as a teenager. Living in the same neighborhood as the group, he became close friends with the member Max "Mikey" Santos, who later asked Love to join.

== Composition ==
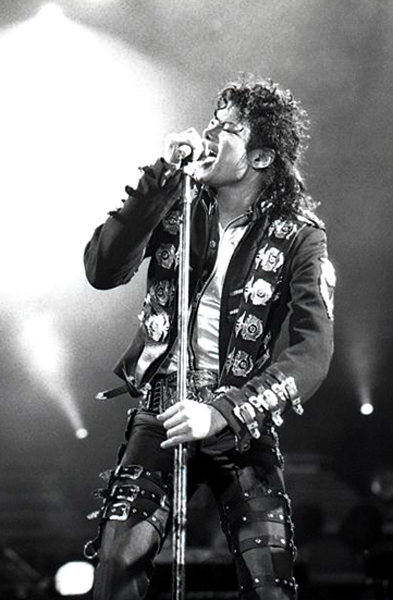
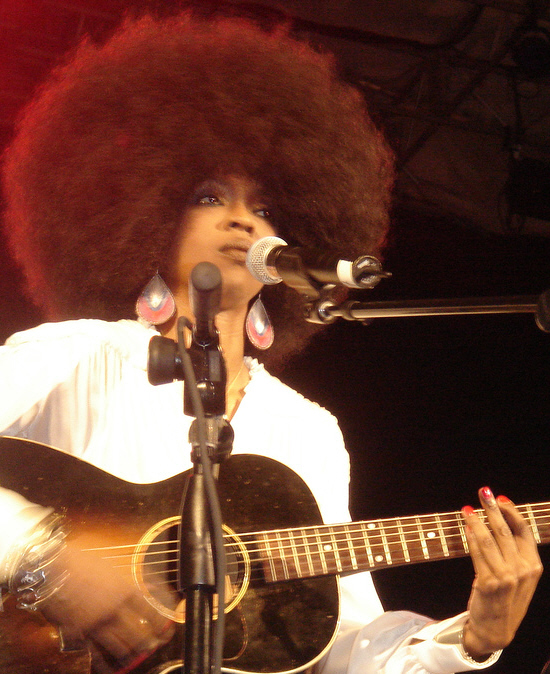
His influential musicians include Michael Jackson and Lauryn Hill (both pictured) which helped combined the mixture of R&B and bachata found on "Tengo Un Amor".

"Tengo Un Amor" was written by Love with additional composition by Edwin Perez who also handled production for the song. The song was written with Spanglish lyrics combining crunk hip hop with bachata. David Jefferies, while reviewing the parent album, called the song an "incredibly smooth, lush, and glittery ballad" while listing the song as a selected "Allmusic Pick". Love later called "Tengo Un Amor" the "door-opener" for all of his future success.

His influential musicians include Michael Jackson, Lauryn Hill, Juan Luis Guerra and Héctor Lavoe, which helped combined the mixture of R&B and bachata found on "Tengo Un Amor". According to Billboard, the original version of the song is a "straightforward bachata song while the remix with R.K.M & Ken-Y, known then as Rakim & Ken-Y provides "urban street cred". The remix also features a verse by R.K.M where he raps to a rhythm of bachata infused with reggaetón, or bachaton.

== Release and chart performance ==
"Tengo Un Amor" was released digitally on November 6, 2006 by Sony BMG Norte. After reaching number three on the Billboard Bubbling Under Hot 100, the song debuted and peaked at number 100 of the Billboard Hot 100 chart for the week of November 18, 2006. On the Billboard Hot Latin Tracks chart, the song debuted for the issue week of August 5, 2006 and peaked at number two for the week of November 11, 2006. For two weeks, David Bisbal's "¿Quién Me Iba a Decir?" withheld the song from the top of the chart. In its third week at the number two spot, Alejandro Sanz' "A la Primera Persona" was occupying the number one spot. This gave R.K.M & Ken-Y their third top 10 single following "Down" and "Me Matas". On the Billboard Latin Tropical Airplay chart, the song debuted for the week of August 19, 2006 and peaked at number three for the week of November 11, 2006. On the Billboard Latin Pop Airplay chart, the song debuted for the week of October 7, 2006 and peaked at number 25 for the week of October 28, 2006. In Los Angeles, the song became one of the top five most requested tracks on the Rhythmic Top 40 KXOL (96.3), the Senior Vice President of which called the song a "smash" while citing its success as an acceptance of Hispanic audiences and urban tastes.

== Accolades ==
"Tengo Un Amor" received three nominations at the 2007 Latin Billboard Music Awards for Best Vocal Duet or Collaboration and Tropical Airplay Song of the Year, Duo or Group for the remix version while winning the award for Tropical Airplay Song of the Year, New Artist category. He was also awarded Best Rap/Hip-Hop Album for Toby Love. The song was award an ASCAP award for Urban Song of the Year from the American Society of Composers, Authors and Publishers. According to Jon Caramanica of New York Times, "Tengo Un Amor" is Love's "biggest hit".

== Charts ==
=== Weekly charts ===
Chart (2006)	Position
US Billboard Hot 100	100
US Bubbling Under Hot 100 (Billboard)	3
US Radio Songs (Billboard)	69
US Latin Songs (Billboard)	2
US Latin Tropical Airplay (Billboard)	3
US Latin Rhythm Airplay (Billboard)	1
US Latin Pop Airplay (Billboard)	25

=== Year-end charts ===
Chart (2006)	Position
US Latin Songs (Billboard)	16
US Latin Rhythm Songs (Billboard)	16
US Tropical Songs (Billboard)	15
Chart (2007)	Position
US Latin Rhythm Songs (Billboard)	34

== Certifications ==
Region	Certification	Certified units/sales
United States (RIAA)	2× Platinum (Latin)	120,000^{‡}
^{‡} Sales+streaming figures based on certification alone.

== See also ==
- List of Billboard Latin Rhythm Airplay number ones of 2006
