= Magic Juan (musician) =

American rapper (born 1971)

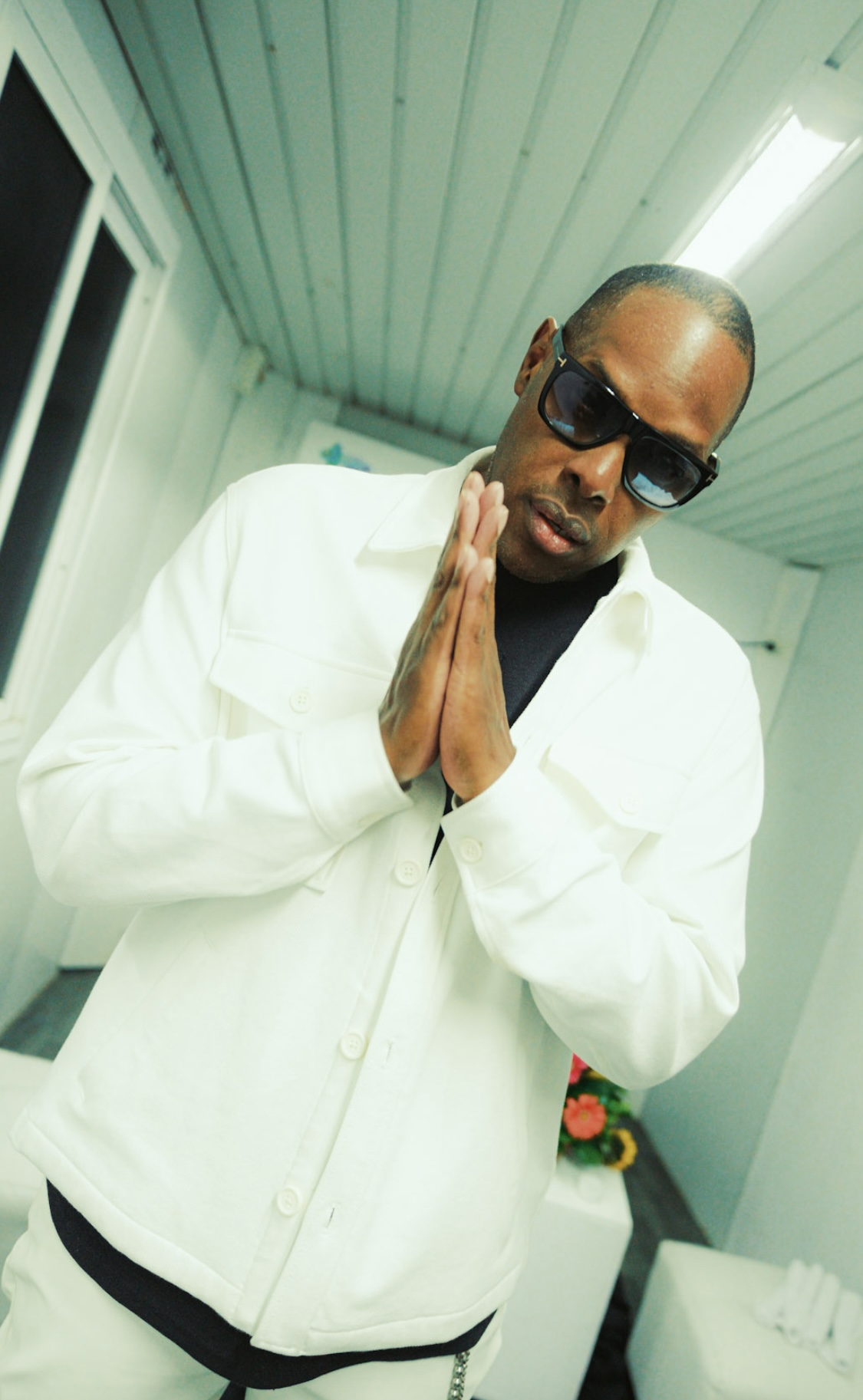
Magic Juan

Magic Juan (born July 27, 1971) is a Dominican-American urban Latino pioneer, widely known as the King of Merengue Hip Hop and the former lead rapper and singer of the group Proyecto Uno. The group gained success with hits like "Brinca" and "Está Pegao" among others, Rolling Stone recognized his hit "El Tiburon" as one of the 25 biggest Latin songs ever recorded, cementing the group's legacy with over 6 million albums sold. After leaving the group, Magic Juan pursued a solo career, blending hip-hop, reggae, dembow and bachata into his own music. Known as "El Negrito del Swing", Magic enjoyed solo success with his debut album, La Prueba, which spawned other hits like "Ta Buena", "Meneando la Pera", and "La Última Vez".

In 2024, Magic Juan made a triumphant return with his album Superhéroe, blending reggaeton, merengue, and hip-hop. The album reflects themes of resilience and empowerment, drawing inspiration from his personal experiences, earning him a Latin Grammy nomination for Album of the Year (Merengue Bachata). His accolades include nominations for Premios Lo Nuestro for Best Urban Album and Best Urban Artist, as well as a nomination for Tropical Song of the Year for "La Última Vez". In 2023, the U.S. House of Representatives honored Magic Juan, also known as "El Duro", for his contributions to hip-hop as part of its 50-year anniversary celebration. His contributions to Latin music have earned him numerous accolades, including the Billboard Latin Music Awards, Premios Juventud, and an Emmy award.

His participation in the Free Cover live unplugged series broke streaming records, and his collaboration on the Beatnuts' hit single "Se Acabo" made TikTok's Top 10 viral songs list in 2022.

== Early life and education ==
Magic Juan was born in Washington Heights, Manhattan, New York City, and raised in Teaneck, New Jersey. He is of Dominican descent. He joined the school choir at the age of ten and took piano, guitar, and drum lessons. After high school, he played with the idea of studying marketing, but after an offer to join Proyecto Uno, a merengue band with heavy urban and hip-hop influences, he decided to drop out of New York Institute of Technology in order to pursue his interest in music.

== Career ==
Juan's bilingual rapping was featured on the single "Brinca," which went to number one in over eight countries in Latin America. Proyecto Uno went on to sell over three million albums worldwide. Juan soon desired to record his own solo material. In 2003, he released his solo debut, La Prueba, and became the New York correspondent for Telemundo's Latin hip-hop show, The Roof.

In 2004, he released Libertad: The Magic Juan Mix and the double CD, Inevitable. On June 9, 2009, Magic released his third studio album as a solo artist, The Sure Bet, containing a wide variety of musical influences, including hip hop, reggae, bachata, salsa, and merengue. The album's first single was "Baby Come Back".

== Recognition ==
- 1993 and 1995: Premios Ronda and Premios Orquídea (Venezuela)
- 1993 and 1996: New York ACE Awards
- 1994: Premios Lo Nuestro, Música Rap 1994
- 1994, 1995 and 1997: New York Premios Estrella
- 1996 and 1997: New York Premios Too Much
- 1996: Song of the Colombian World Cup Team Está Pegao
- 1997: Billboard Latin Music Awards, Rap Album Of the Year, In Da' House 1997
- 1998: Billboard Latin Music Awards, Latin Dance Single of the Year, Mueve La Cadera (Move your Hips) with Reel 2 Reel
- 1998: Nominated: Premios Lo Nuestro, Grupo Del Año-Tropical
- 1999: Nominated to Billboard Latin Music Awards, Latin Dance Club Play Track of the Year, No Nos Tenemos (NNT)
- 1999: Emmy Awards, Outstanding Original Music Composition
- 2000: Nominated Colombian Song of the Year 25 horas
- 2002 20 Éxitos
- 2002 Todo Éxitos
- 2005 Éxitos de Proyecto Uno
- 2024 Latin Grammy Nomination For Best Merengue And Bachata Album

== Singles ==
- El Tiburón" (The Shark) (1993)
- "Pumpin'"
- "El grillero"
- "Te dejaron flat"
- "Brinca" {Jump}
- "Hombre fiel"
- "Empujando el cielo"
- "Es tu cumpleaños"
- "Candela"
- "Está pegao"
- "Latinos"
- "Mueve la cadera" (Move your hip)
- "Baby Come Back" (2008)
- "Venezolana" (2012)
- "Eembrujao" (2014)
- "Toy En Ti" (2014)
- "Chévere" featuring "Happy Colors" (2017)
- "Chévere - Remix" feat "Happy Colors and Gualtiero" (2017)
- "La Musa" (2019)
- "Matatana" (2019)
- "Donde Nos Vamos A Ver" - Remix feat "Chyno Miranda and Juan Magán" (2019)
- "Jeruselema" feat "Martin Machore" (2020)
- "Chica Superpoderosa" feat "Martin Machore" (2021)
- "Chica Superpoderosa" feat "Martin Machore" Salsa Version (2021)
- "Chica Superpoderosa" feat "Martin Machore" Salsa Instrumental Version (2021)
- "Chica Superpoderosa" feat "Martin Machore" Salsa Choke Version (2021)
- "Huele a Marihuana" feat "Martin Machore and Budu" (2021)
- "Se Te Sube" Zumba Mix (2021)
- "La Nueva Cita" feat "Reykon" (2022)
- "Mix Magic Juan: Latinos / Tiburón / Está Pegao / Another Night" feat Free Cover Venezuela" (2022)
- "La Blusa" feat "Xantos and Mark B" (2022)
- "Adicto" Remix feat "Omar Acedo" (2022)
- "A Mover El Cuerpo" (Zumba Remix) feat "Don Fulano" (2022)
- "Mix Sandy & Papo MC: La Hora de Bailar / Mueve Mueve / La Ultima Vez" feat "free Cover Venezuela" (2022)
- "Cuando La Vi" feat "Pasabordo" (2023)
- "No Se Cae" (2023)
- "Volvi" (2024)
- "Vibra" (2024)
- "Vamos Ahora" (2024)
- "Tu Forma De Ser (Love your way)" feat "Frankie J and David Anthony" (2024)
- "Tsunami" (2024)
- "The One (Eres Tu)" (2024)
- "Superhéroe" (2024)
- "Suelata Eso" Afro Mix (2024)
- "Suelta Eso" (2024)

== Solo albums ==
- The Album (2000)
- La Prueba (2001)
- This Thing Of Ours (2003)
- El Duro (2004)
- Libertad: The Magic Juan Street Mix Jump Off (2004)
- Inevitable (2004)
- Quiscalle (2007)
- The Sure Bet (2009)
- Éxitos (2016)
- Live RD (2023)
- Superhéroe (2024)
