= It's VENA (Live) =

EP by Vena
- Released: September 18, 2015
- Genre: Bachata; tropical; pop
- Length: 26:37
- Language: Spanish
- Label: Planet Records; Element Music Group

Singles from It's VENA
- 1. "Dile a Él" Released: 2014

It's VENA (Live) is a live extended play by bachata trio Vena. It was released on September 18, 2015, by Planet Records and Element Music Group. It is a selection on their best hits performed live. It contains six tracks, five live and one studio recording. The one studio song is the single "Dile a Él", which peaked at No. 16 on the Billboard Tropical Airplay chart. A live version is also featured. The EP peaked at No. 10 on the Billboard Tropical Albums chart.

== Track listing ==
Track numbers 1 to 5 are live.

No.	Title	Length
1.	"Dile a Él"	4:04
2.	"Sangre De Mis Venas"	4:10
3.	"Corazón De Hierro"	4:55
4.	"Ya No"	5:13
5.	"Por Mentiras"	4:30
6.	"Dile a Él" (studio version)	3:45
Total length:		26:37

== Charts ==
Chart (2015)	Peak position
US Tropical Albums (Billboard)	10
