= Trampa de Amor =

Studio album by Los Tinellers
- Released: 1996
- Recorded: 1995–1996
- Genre: Bachata
- Length: 45:48
- Labels: Elca Productions & Rincón Musical

Los Tinellers chronology
Trampa de Amor (1996)	Generation Next (1999)

Trampa de Amor (English: Love Trap) is the original first album by the bachata music group Aventura, when they use to call themselves Los Tinellers (Los Teenagers). The album was named after its title track, which is the first track on the album. Trampa de Amor was released in 1996, under Elca Productions & Rincón Musical. Seven of the ten tracks are the original versions of songs which were later re-recorded by the group after changing their name to Aventura. One of the songs, "Por Tu Orgullo" ("Because of Your Pride"), was added to God's Project. The other six were added to Generation Next. These seven songs were added to these two albums with each of them being more modern remakes. The other 3 tracks were never put on other albums nor ever had a re-make. On January 19, 2024, a remastered version of Trampa de Amor was released to digital platforms.

== Background ==
The group met Elvin Polanco during the 1995 Bronx Dominican parade. Polanco was the coordinator of that parade at the time so Anthony and Lenny approached him to ask if he could give them a chance to perform on stage for the parade. Polanco gave them the chance and was so impressed with their performance that he decided to become their manager to help the group in their pursuit of a music career. Polanco spent a few months trying to find an investor. He met Carlos Dalmasi, who was the leader of Dominican merengue group Los Paymasi. He also helped out trying to find an investor, but he too was unsuccessful. This led Polanco to use $5,000 out of his savings to invest in the recording of at least two to three songs (he was originally going to use the money to buy his mother a property in the Dominican Republic). This would also lead Dalmasi and Polanco to create their own independent record label called Elca Productions. The name came from the first two letters of their first names, Elvin and Carlos.

With the money to start making the first three songs, Polanco worked with Dominican bachata musician Nelson Herrera, who was working with Polanco at the time, as he asked him to help him create songs for the group. Later on, Polanco and Dalmasi made more money from other artists they were working with and along with Herrera made seven other songs, thus completing the creation of the album. Polanco said in an interview that he had spent a total of $11,000 to $12,000. The album was titled Trampa de Amor, because Polanco thought it was a beautiful name. The band wanted the album to be called Cuando Volveras, which later on became their debut single, but Polanco thought his choice was better and the group in the end agreed.

== Album cover ==
The album cover only featured Romeo and Lenny. This is because Henry and Mikey were late to the photo session due to getting stuck in train traffic. Elvin Polanco, who was in charge of the group at the time, mentioned this in an interview. He also mentioned that since the photo session was too expensive for them at the time, they did not have more money to pay the photographer for an extra hour. So he decided to only have the two members that were there. The other members agreed with the decision to release the production with only Romeo and Lenny on the cover because they were on the rush to release the album and the fact that they could not afford another photo session. Henry and Mikey were members of the group regardless of the album cover situation.

== 2024 remaster ==
From 1996 to 2023, the album was only available on physical CDs. It was later available online, but it was either uploaded by random people on YouTube or on pirated websites, meaning that they were not able to monetize it nor earn any money from it digitally. On January 18, 2024, Henry and Lenny announced that after 28 years, they would finally release the album on all major digital streaming platforms. The album was remastered and it was released the next day. Now that the album is available on these platforms, the group could now monetize all the songs and receive earnings from their streaming.

== Track listing ==
All tracks are written by Anthony "Romeo" Santos, except where noted.

No.	Title	Writer(s)	Translation	Length
1.	"Trampa de Amor"		"Love Trap"	4:14
2.	"Cuando Volverás"		"When Will You Come Back"	4:38
3.	"Alexandra"			3:53
4.	"Que Se Logre Este Amor"		"May This Love Be Achieved"	3:54
5.	"Por Tu Orgullo"		"Because of Your Pride"	4:49
6.	"Abuelita"		"Grandma"	4:51
7.	"Me Duele El Corazón"	Henry Santos Jeter	"My Heart Hurts"	3:54
8.	"Si Me Dejas, Muero"		"If You Leave Me, I'll Die"	5:33
9.	"Dime Si Te Gusto"		"Tell Me If You Like Me"	4:28
10.	"El Coro Dominicano"		"The Dominican Chorus"	5:34
Total length:				45:48
