= After The Noise (Lado A) =

Studio album by Henry Santos
- Released: September 4, 2026
- Genre: Bachata
- Length: 36:49
- Label: Hustle Hard Entertainment

Henry Santos chronology
2.0 (2024)	After The Noise (Lado A) (2026)

Singles from After The Noise (Lado A)
- 1. "Lo Que No Nace" Released: May 22, 2026; 2. "1ra. Cita" Released: August 14, 2026; 3. "Leyendas" Released: September 3, 2026

After The Noise (Lado A) (English: A Side) is the seventh studio album by Dominican singer Henry Santos. It was released by his own record label, HustleHard Entertainment, on September 4, 2026.

== Singles ==
This album was supported by the 3 singles: "Lo Que No Nace", "1ra. Cita", and "Leyendas", which features his Aventura band mates Lenny and Max Santos.

== Track listing ==
No.	Title	Length
1.	"After The Noise (Lado A Intro)"	1:55
2.	"Like" (featuring JFab & Paola Fabre)	2:59
3.	"1ra. Cita"	3:51
4.	"Lo Que No Nace"	3:42
5.	"Leyendas" (featuring Lenny Santos & Max Santos The Thunder)	4:54
6.	"Hombre & Hembra"	4:00
7.	"Diamante & Esmeralda"	4:03
8.	"De Otra Vida"	3:39
9.	"Cicatrices"	3:50
10.	"Gracias"	3:56
Total length:		36:49
