= Vena (group) =

American bachata group

- Also known as: D'Element; DNA Latin Group
- Origin: Bronx, New York
- Genres: Bachata
- Years active: 2011–2019
- Labels: Planet Records; Element Music Group
- Past members: Lenny Santos; Max Santos; Steven Tejada (Steve Styles); Sammy Genao; Aileen Rosario; J Love

Vena, was an American bachata group formed by members Lenny Santos and Max Santos from Aventura alongside Steven Tejada from Xtreme. They are known for their hits such as "Sangre De Mis Venas", "Corazón De Hierro" (featuring Teodoro Reyes & Frank Reyes), "Señora", "Dile a Él", "Por Mentiras", among others. VENA alongside Larry Hernandez were nominated for a Billboard Mexican Music Award in 2012.

== History ==
=== D'Element (2011) ===
After Aventura announced their separation in 2011, Max would work on his solo rap project while he was only producing music as he isn't a singer nor rapper. Lenny decided to form a new bachata group and convinced Max to join. They recruited Sammy Genao and Aileen Rosario to form the group D'Element. They released their first single song called "You & Me" in 2011. In the same year they released two other singles: "Muere Un Hombre" and "Always". Unfortunately the group did not last long and would come to an end in the same year.

=== VENA (2011–2016) ===
In 2011, Aventura weren't the only group in Bachata to take a hiatus. Dominican-American duo Xtreme had also taken a hiatus as well as both Steve Styles and Danny D decided to embark on their own solo careers. Steve went to Lenny as a client to work on music. While Lenny were working together, Lenny asked Steve if he would like to form a group with him. Steve accepted the offer and along with Max they formed VENA. They adapted the "Bachata Supergroup" concept as members from two former popular bachata groups merged into one.

On October 19, 2011, they released their first single "Señora". The song did well commercially and became top radio hit. Later on they released a Bachata and Merengue Mambo cover of LMFAO"s "Party Rock Anthem". On February 5, 2012 they released their second single "Ya No". It peaked at number 10 on the Billboard Tropical Airplay chart. The music video was released on May 17, 2012. In the same year, they released "Por Mentiras" on March 12. Also, they were featured in the song A Escondidas with Mexican-American singer Larry Hernández for his 2012 studio album, Capaz de Todo. They perform the song live at the 2012 Billboard Mexican Music Awards, thus making Vena the first bachata act to do so.

On July 9, 2013, they released "Sangre De Mis Venas". It peaked at number 22 on the Billboard Tropical Airplay chart. On November 13, 2013, they released "Corazón De Hierro". It featured Dominican Bachata singers Teodoro Reyes and Frank Reyes. It peaked at number 5 on the Billboard Tropical Airplay chart. In 2014, they released "It Wont Stop". It featured Aileen who was a member of the D'Element. It is a bachata cover of Sevyn Streeter's "It Won't Stop", which featured Chris Brown. Later that year, they released the single "Dile a Él". It peaked at number 16 on the Billboard Tropical Airplay chart.

September 18, 2015, they released their first and only live EP, It's VENA (Live). It peaked at number 10 on the Billboard Tropical Albums chart. On November 19, 2015, they released a Bachata cover of Drake's Hotline Bling and featured L.O.S. On November 25, 2015, it was confirmed during an interview that Steve Style left the group to pursue a solo career. Lenny had confirmed that Steve wanted to leave the group and wanted to start his own path. Lenny wanted Steve to stay until the release of a studio album they were planning to release. He also mentioned that Steve was one of the reasons why the album had not been released sooner. The group had dates that needed to be fulfil and since Steve was no longer in the group, they got Dominican Bachata singer Karlos Rosé to take Steve's place to finish the dates of the tour. After the final tour, the group would come to an end. Max left the group to pursue and focus on his rap career which he was supposed to do back when Aventura first separated. Lenny released the group's final single "El Final" which featured Mike Stanley. The song was written by Steve Styles. Steve released his version of "El Final" as well as his first solo single.

=== DNA Latin Group (2017–2019) ===
In 2018, Lenny formed a duo with a singer by the name of J Love, who at the time was a new artist. The duo was called DNA Latin Group. They released their first single "Lujuria" on March 16, 2018. They released their second single "Hermanita" on May 30, 2018. Max then joined the Lenny and J Love, thus converting the group in to a trio. They released their third and final single "Soy Tu Delirio" on December 24, 2018. On February 9, 2019 Steve Styles would reunite with Lenny and Max as the DNA Latin Group would perform alongside Xtreme, who had reunited at the time, for a "Mega Bachaton" in Adelphi, Maryland. The group were supposedly working to release more music in 2019 but it never happened as the group ended in 2019. J Love would continue as a solo artist. Lenny and Max would eventually reunite with Henry and Romeo to reform Aventura in 2019 to release the single Immortal and then go on a tour the year after.

== Members ==
D'Element Members

- Sammy Genao – male vocals
- Aileen Rosario – female vocals
- Lenny Santos – lead guitar, rhythm guitar, electric guitar, arranger, producer
- Max Santos – bass guitar

Vena Members

- Steven Tejada – lead vocals, songwriter
- Lenny Santos – lead guitar, rhythm guitar, electric guitar, arranger, producer
- Max Santos – bass guitar

DNA Latin Group Members

- Julio Bello a.k.a. J Love - lead vocals, composer
- Lenny Santos – lead guitar, rhythm guitar, electric guitar, arranger, producer
- Max Santos – bass guitar

== Discography ==
=== Singles ===
As D'Element

- You & Me (2011)
- Always (2011)
- Muere Un Hombre (2011)

As VENA

As lead artist

Year	Single	Chart positions	Album	Certifications
Year	Single	U.S. Latin Tropical Airplay	Album	Certifications
2011	"Señora"	—	Non-album singles	
2011	"Party Rock Anthem" (Bachata & Merengue Mambo Cover)	—	Non-album singles	
2012	"Ya No"	10	Non-album singles	
2012	"Por Mentiras"	—	Non-album singles	
2013	"Sangre De Mis Venas"	22	Non-album singles	
2013	"Corazón De Hierro" (featuring Teodoro Reyes & Frank Reyes)	5	Non-album singles	
2014	"It Won't Stop" (Bachata Cover) (featuring Aileen)	—	Non-album singles	
2014	"Dile a Él"	16	It's VENA (Live)	
2015	"Hotline Bling" (Bachata Remix) (featuring L.O.S)	—	Non-album singles	
2016	"El Final" (featuring Mike Stanley)	—	Non-album singles	
"—" denotes a title that was not released or did not chart in that territory

As featured artist

- A Escondidas (with Larry Hernández)

As DNA Latin Group

- Lujuria (2018)
- Hermanita (2018)
- Soy Tu Delirio (2018)

=== Live EP From Vena ===
- It's VENA (Live) (2015)
