= Dile a Él (Vena song) =

Single by Vena

from the album It's VENA (Live)
- Released: 2014 (Original release); April 14, 2015 (re-released)
- Recorded: 2014
- Genre: Bachata
- Length: 4:07
- Label: Planet Records; Element Music Group

Vena singles chronology
"It Won't Stop (Bachata Cover)" (2014)	"Dile a Él" (2014)	"Hotline Bling (Bachata Remix)" (2015)

"Dile a Él" (English:"Tell Him") is a song by Dominican-American bachata trio Vena. It was first released in late 2014 by Planet Records and Len Melody's Element Music Group. Then it was re-released on April 14, 2015. It served as the main single for the group's live EP It's VENA (Live) (2015). This was the final single with Steve Styles as he subsequently left the group to embark on a solo career.

== Charts ==
Chart (2015)	Peak position
US Tropical Airplay (Billboard)	16
