= La Vida (Henry Santos song) =

2014 single by Henry Santos

Single by Henry Santos featuring Maffio

from the album My Way
- Released: February 17, 2014
- Recorded: 2013
- Genre: Bachata
- Length: 3:08
- Label: Hustle Hard Entertainment; Siente Music; VeneMusic; Universal Music Latino
- Songwriters: Henry Santos, Carlos Ariel Peralta

Henry Santos featuring Maffio singles chronology
"Bésame Siempre" (2013)	"La Vida" (2014)	"Y Eres Tan Bella" (2015)

Music video
- "La Vida" on YouTube

"La Vida" (The Life) is a song by Dominican singer Henry Santos featuring Urban Music artist Maffio. It served as the third single for Santos's second album My Way (2013). The music video was released on May 2, 2014.

== Charts ==
Chart performance for "La Vida"
Chart (2014)	Peak position
US Tropical Airplay (Billboard)	1

== See also ==
- List of Billboard Tropical Airplay number ones of 2014
