= Leyendas (Henry Santos song) =

2026 single by Henry Santos

Single by Henry Santos featuring Lenny Santos & Max Santos The Thunder

from the album After The Noise (Lado A)
- Released: September 3, 2026 (Radio Edit); September 4, 2026 (Full Version) (album release)
- Recorded: 2026
- Genre: Bachata
- Length: 4:15 (Radio Edit); 4:54 (Album Version)
- Label: Hustle Hard Entertainment
- Songwriter: Henry Santos Jeter
- Producers: Henry Santos Jeter; Lenny Santos

Henry Santos singles chronology
| "1ra Cita" (2026) | "Leyendas" (2026) |

"Leyendas" (English: Legends) is a song by Dominican singer Henry Santos. It serves as the third single for his seventh studio album After The Noise (Lado A) (2026). A radio edit version was released to promote the album on September 3, 2026. The following day, the full version was released as the fifth track of the album. The song features his Aventura band mates, Lenny on the guitar, and Max Santos on the base.

== Charts ==
Chart performance for "Leyendas"
| Chart (2026) | Peak position |
|---|---|
| Dominican Republic Airplay (Monitor Latino) | 1 |
| Dominican Republic Bachata (Monitor Latino) | 1 |
