= I'll Be There (The Jackson 5 song) =

1970 single by the Jackson 5

Single by the Jackson 5

from the album Third Album
- B-side: "One More Chance"
- Released: August 28, 1970
- Recorded: June 1970
- Studio: Hitsville West (Los Angeles)
- Genre: Soul
- Length: 3:57
- Label: Motown
- Songwriters: Berry Gordy; Bob West; Willie Hutch; Hal Davis
- Producer: Hal Davis

The Jackson 5 singles chronology
"The Love You Save" (1970)	"I'll Be There" (1970)	"Santa Claus Is Comin' to Town" (1970)

Alternative release(s)
- Solid centre variant of the UK single

Lyric video
- "I'll Be There" by Jackson 5 on YouTube

"I'll Be There" is the first single released from Third Album by The Jackson 5. It was written by Berry Gordy, Hal Davis, Bob West, and Willie Hutch.

The song was recorded by The Jackson 5 and released by Motown Records on August 28, 1970, as the first single from their Third Album on the same date. Produced by the songwriters, "I'll Be There" was The Jackson 5's fourth number-one hit in a row (after "I Want You Back" in 1969, "ABC" and "The Love You Save" earlier in 1970), making them the first group to have their first four singles reach number one and the first black male group with four consecutive number-one pop hits in the same year. "I'll Be There" is also notable as the most successful single released by Motown during its "Detroit era" (1959–1972). In 2011, the song was inducted into the Grammy Hall of Fame.

A duet version by Mariah Carey and Trey Lorenz was recorded during Carey's appearance on MTV Unplugged in 1992, and released as the first single from her EP MTV Unplugged in the second quarter of 1992. Co-produced by Carey and Walter Afanasieff, "I'll Be There" became Carey's sixth number-one single in the US, and her biggest hit elsewhere at the time.

== Release and reaction ==
In his 1988 autobiography Moonwalk, Michael Jackson noted that "I'll Be There" was the song that solidified The Jackson 5's careers and showed audiences that the group had potential beyond bubblegum pop. Said Allmusic about the song, "Rarely, if ever, had one so young sung with so much authority and grace, investing this achingly tender ballad with wisdom and understanding far beyond his years". Michael turned 12 one day after the song was released.

Record World said that the "change of pace [in using a slower tempo song than usual] showcases the group's versatility."

The most successful single ever released by the Jackson 5, "I'll Be There" sold 4.2 million copies in the United States, and 6.1 million copies worldwide. It replaced Marvin Gaye's "I Heard It Through the Grapevine" as the most successful single released on Motown in the US, a record it held until the release of Lionel Richie's duet with Diana Ross, "Endless Love" (1981). Outside the US, "I Heard It Through the Grapevine" remained Motown's biggest-selling record with worldwide sales of over seven million copies.

The song held the number-one position on the Billboard Pop Singles Chart for five weeks from October 17 to November 14, replacing "Cracklin' Rosie" by Neil Diamond; it was succeeded by "I Think I Love You" by The Partridge Family. "I'll Be There" was also a number-one hit on the Billboard Best Selling Soul Singles Chart for six weeks, and a number 4 hit in the United Kingdom. The single's B-side was "One More Chance", a song from their second album.

"I'll Be There" was the Jackson 5's final number-one Hot 100 hit as a group. For the rest of their career as a major-label act, Jackson 5 singles would climb no higher than number 2. Michael Jackson scored numerous number-one hits as a solo artist, beginning with "Ben" in 1972. In 2020, Busta Rhymes released a song titled “Look Over Your Shoulders” featuring vocals from Kendrick Lamar, sampling “I’ll Be There”.

The song was remixed by Wayne Wilkins for the 2009 release The Remix Suite.

In 2011, this version of the song by The Jackson 5 on Motown Records was inducted into the Grammy Hall of Fame.

== Personnel ==
- Michael Jackson – lead and background vocals
- Jermaine Jackson – lead and background vocals
- Tito Jackson – background vocals
- Marlon Jackson – background vocals
- Jackie Jackson – background vocals, tambourine
- Los Angeles area studio musicians – instrumentation
  - David T. Walker – guitar
  - Louis Shelton – guitar
  - Arthur Wright – guitar
  - Bob West – bass
  - Gene Pello – drums
  - Joe Sample – keyboards
- Produced by Hal Davis
- Arranged by Bob West

== Charts ==
=== Weekly singles ===
Chart (1970–1971)	Peak position
Australia (Go-Set)	31
Netherlands (Dutch Top 40)	16
Ireland (IRMA)	14
New Zealand (Listener)	18
UK Singles (Official Charts)	4
US Billboard Hot 100	1
US Adult Contemporary (Billboard)	24
US Best Selling Soul Singles (Billboard)	1
West Germany (Official German Charts)	45
Chart (2009)	Peak position
Austria (Ö3 Austria Top 40)	60
Netherlands (Single Top 100)	62
Switzerland (Schweizer Hitparade)	73
UK Singles (Official Charts)	49

=== Year-end charts ===
Chart (1970)	Rank
US Billboard Hot 100	7

Chart (1971)	Rank
UK Singles (OCC)	49

=== All-time charts ===
Chart (1958-2018)	Position
US Billboard Hot 100	170

== Certifications and sales ==
Region	Certification	Certified units/sales
United Kingdom (BPI)	Gold	400,000^{‡}
United States	—	4,200,000
Summaries
Worldwide	—	6,100,000
^{‡} Sales+streaming figures based on certification alone.

== Mariah Carey version ==
American singer-songwriter Mariah Carey had included "I'll Be There" as the sixth track on her MTV Unplugged special, taped on March 16, 1992. It was performed as a romantic duet, with Carey singing Michael Jackson's lines and R&B singer Trey Lorenz singing Jermaine Jackson's lines. "I'll Be There" was released on May 26 1992 as the lead single from Carey's live extended play MTV Unplugged. Co-produced by Carey and Walter Afanasieff, "I'll Be There" reached number one on the US Billboard Hot 100, becoming Carey's sixth chart-topper. The song also became her most successful single internationally at the time, peaking at number one in Canada, the Netherlands and New Zealand, as well as reaching the top five in the United Kingdom and Ireland, the top ten in Australia, and the top twenty in most markets across Europe.

"I'll Be There" received nominations for the Grammy Awards for Grammy Award for Best R&B Performance by a Duo or Group with Vocals and Grammy Award for Best R&B Song. Regularly, the song has been featured on Carey's catalog albums included on #1's (1998), Greatest Hits (2001), The Ballads (2008), The Essential Mariah Carey (2011), and #1 to Infinity (2015). During Michael Jackson's memorial service on July 7, 2009, Carey and Lorenz sang their rendition of the song in tribute to Jackson 17 years after their first performance together.

== Arthur Hanlon version ==
"I'll Be There (Allí Estaré)"

Single by Arthur Hanlon featuring Karlos Rosé
- Released: May 28, 2013
- Genre: Bachata
- Length: 3:32
- Label: Universal Latin
- Songwriters: Berry Gordy; Bob West; Willie Hutch; Hal Davis
- Producers: Arthur Hanlon; David Cabrera

Karlos Rosé singles chronology
"Infiel" (2013)	"I'll Be There (Allí Estaré)" (2013)

In 2013, American pianist Arthur Hanlon covered the song in bachata with Dominican guest singer Karlos Rosé as the lead vocalist. Their cover was recorded in Spanglish and was included on Hanlon's Encanto del Caribe tour. The song was produced by Hanlon and David Cabera.

=== Charts ===
Chart (2013)	Peak position
US Hot Latin Songs (Billboard)	41
US Tropical Airplay (Billboard)	4

== See also ==
- Hot 100 number-one hits of 1970 (United States)
- List of Billboard Hot 100 number-one singles of 1992
- List of number-one adult contemporary singles of 1992 (U.S.)
