= Sangre de Mis Venas =

"Sangre De Mis Venas"

Single by Vena
- Released: July 9, 2013
- Recorded: 2012
- Genre: Bachata
- Length: 4:09
- Label: Planet Records; Element Music Group

Vena singles chronology
| "Por Mentiras" (2012) | "Sangre De Mis Venas" (2013) | "Corazón De Hierro" (2013) |

Music video
- "Sangre De Mis Venas" on YouTube

"Sangre De Mis Venas" (English:"Blood in My Veins") is a song by Dominican-American bachata trio Vena. It was released on July 9, 2013, by Planet Records and Len Melody's Element Music Group.

== Charts ==
| Chart (2013) | Peak position |
|---|---|
| US Tropical Airplay (Billboard) | 22 |
