= My Way (Henry Santos album) =

Studio album by Henry Santos
- Released: June 25, 2013
- Recorded: 2013
- Genre: Bachata
- Length: 43:02
- Label: Hustle Hard Entertainment; Siente Music; VeneMusic; Universal Music Latino

Henry Santos chronology
Introducing Henry Santos (2011)	My Way (2013)	The Third (Deluxe) (2016)

Singles from My Way
- 1. "My Way" Released: January 9, 2013; 2. "Bésame Siempre" Released: May 2013; 3. "La Vida" Released: February 17, 2014

My Way is the second solo album by bachata singer Henry Santos. This album included three singles that peaked in the Billboard Tropical Airplay chart. Its lead single, "My Way", which the album is named after, peaked at number 1. The second single, "Bésame Siempre", peaked at number 11. The third single, "La Vida", which featured Maffio, peaked at number 1 in 2014.

== Track listing ==
No.	Title	Length
1.	"Prologo"	1:08
2.	"My Way"	3:50
3.	"Tango A La Diva"	4:32
4.	"La Vida" (featuring Maffio)	3:08
5.	"Mi Poesia"	4:14
6.	"Bésame Siempre"	4:02
7.	"Tu, Yo & El DJ"	3:38
8.	"No Se Vivir Sin Ti" (featuring Bobby Pulido)	3:41
9.	"Vuelve Conmigo"	3:40
10.	"Juntos Podemos Volar" (featuring Natti Natasha & El Adictivo Sonido L.A.X.)	2:56
11.	"Preso En Tu Carcel"	3:51
12.	"Amor Y Dinero"	4:17
Total length:		43:02

== Charts ==
Chart (2013)	Peak Position
US Top Latin Albums (Billboard)	59
US Tropical Albums (Billboard)	9
