= Quédate =

Quédate refer to:

- "Quédate" (Soraya song), 1996
- "Quédate" (Pee Wee song), 2009
- "Quédate" (Henry Santos song), 2016
- "Quevedo: Bzrp Music Sessions, Vol. 52", 2022 song
- "Quédate", a 1999 song by Lara Fabian from the album Lara Fabian
