= The Third (Henry Santos album) =

Studio album by Henry Santos
- Released: April 8, 2016
- Recorded: 2015–2016
- Genre: Bachata
- Length: 40:11
- Label: Hustle Hard Entertainment

Henry Santos chronology
My Way (2013)	The Third (2016)	The Live Album: Sólo Éxitos (2017)

Singles from The Third
- 1. "Y Eres Tan Bella" Released: August 25, 2015; 2. "Quédate" Released: February 19, 2016; 3. "Cuídame" Released: November 3, 2016; 4. "Si Me Besa Tu Boca" Released: January 15, 2017

The Third, now referred to as Henry The Third, is the third studio album by bachata singer Henry Santos. This album included two singles that peaked in the Billboard Tropical Airplay chart. Its lead single, "Y Eres Tan Bella", peaked at number 23. The second single, "Quédate", peaked at number 22. This is also his first album after no longer being signed to Siente Music & Universal Music Latino. He released it under his own record label, HustleHard Entertainment.

== Track listing ==
Standard
No.	Title	Length
1.	"Quédate"	4:01
2.	"Cuídame"	3:25
3.	"Trece Días (Migajitas De Amor)"	3:38
4.	"Ella Me Dijo" (featuring Gente De Zona & Maffio)	3:12
5.	"Ella Tiene Mareo"	3:51
6.	"Y Eres Tan Bella"	3:33
7.	"Si Me Besa Tu Boca" (featuring Leoni Torres)	4:01
8.	"Hasta En Tus Sueños" (featuring Jhoni The Voice)	3:48
9.	"Para Volverte A Ver"	3:07
Total length:		32:42

Deluxe
No.	Title	Length
10.	"Si Me Besa Tu Boca" (only Henry Santos)	4:01
11.	"Tu & Yo"	3:28
Total length:		40:11
