= Leyendas =

Leyendas (English translation: Legends) may refer to:

- Leyendas (franchise), an animated horror-comedy film franchise
- Leyendas (convention), a fantasy and science fiction convention, held annually in Rosario, Argentina
- "Leyendas" (Karol G song), a 2021 song by Karol G, remixing songs from various other artists
- "Leyendas" (Henry Santos song), 2026

== See also ==
- Legend Quest (2017 TV series), released in Latin America as Las Leyendas, a Mexican animated fantasy comedy-horror television series
