= List of number-one Billboard Tropical Songs of 2014 =

The Billboard Tropical Airplay chart ranks the best-performing tropical songs of the United States. Published by Billboard magazine, the data are compiled by Nielsen Broadcast Data Systems based collectively on each single's weekly airplay.

== Chart history ==
Issue date	Song	Artist	Ref
January 4	"Hey"	Toby Love	
January 11	"Propuesta indecente"	Romeo Santos	
January 18	"Propuesta indecente"	Romeo Santos	
January 25	"Cambio de piel"	Marc Anthony	
February 1	"Sopa de Caracol - Yupi"	Elvis Crespo featuring Pitbull	
February 8	"Cambio de piel"	Marc Anthony	
February 15	"With or Without You"	Johnny Sky	
February 22	"Cambio de piel"	Marc Anthony	
March 1	"Cambio de piel"	Marc Anthony	
March 8	"Te Robare"	Prince Royce	
March 15	"Cambio de piel"	Marc Anthony	
March 22	"El Perdedor"	Enrique Iglesias featuring Marco Antonio Solis	
March 29	"Una Vez Mas"	Victor Manuelle featuring Reik	
April 5	"Chico Ideal"	Chino & Nacho	
April 12	"Te Robare"	Prince Royce	
April 19	"6 AM"	J Balvin	
April 26	"6 AM"	J Balvin	
May 3	"Bajo La Tormenta"	Sergio George Presents Salsa Giants	
May 10	"Odio"	Romeo Santos featuring Drake	
May 17	"Bajo La Tormenta"	Sergio George Presents Salsa Giants	
May 24	"Odio"	Romeo Santos featuring Drake	
May 31	"Flor Pálida"	Marc Anthony	
June 7	"Duele"	Optimo	
June 14	"Flor Pálida"	Marc Anthony	
June 21	"El Gran Perdedor"	Tito El Bambino	
June 28	"La Vida"	Henry Santos featuring Maffio	
July 5	"Bailando"	Enrique Iglesias featuring Descemer Bueno & Gente De Zona	
July 12	"Bailando"	Enrique Iglesias featuring Descemer Bueno & Gente De Zona	
July 19	"Eres Mia"	Romeo Santos	
July 26	"Ole Brazil"	Elvis Crespo featuring Maluma	
August 2	"Soy El Mismo"	Prince Royce	
August 9	"Cuando Nos Volvamos a Encontrar"	Carlos Vives featuring Marc Anthony	
August 16	"Pegago a tu Boco"	Grupo Treo	
August 23	"Eres Mia"	Romeo Santos	
August 30	"Bailando"	Enrique Iglesias featuring Descemer Bueno & Gente De Zona	
September 6	"Tu Me Quemas"	Chino & Nacho Featuring Gente de Zona & Los Cadillacs	
September 13	"One More Night"	Johnny Sky	
September 20	"Bailando"	Enrique Iglesias featuring Descemer Bueno & Gente De Zona	
September 27	"Nina de Mi Corazon"	Karlos Rosé	
October 4	"A Que No Te Atreves"	Tito El Bambino El Patron Featuring Chencho	
October 11	"Pirata de amor"	Yanfourd	
October 18	"Como Yo Le Doy"	Pitbull featuring Don Miguelo	
October 25	"Quiero Saber de Ti"	Charlie Cruz	
November 1	"Solo Te Amo"	Anthony Santos	
November 8	"Tus Besos"	Juan Luis Guerra & 440	
November 15	"Noche de Copas"	Luis Enrique	
November 22	"Vuelve"	Optimo	
November 29	"Que Suenen Los Tambores"	Victor Manuelle	
December 6	"Que Suenen Los Tambores"	Victor Manuelle	
December 13	"Que Suenen Los Tambores"	Victor Manuelle	
December 20	"Que Suenen Los Tambores"	Victor Manuelle	
December 27	"Que Suenen Los Tambores"	Victor Manuelle	
