= Ya No =

Ya No may refer to:

- "Ya No" (Vena song), 2012
- "Ya No", a song by Ha*Ash featuring Kalimba from Mundos Opuestos (2005)
- "Ya No", a song by Lucero from Sólo Pienso en Ti (1991)
- "Ya No", a Spanish-language version of the song "I Know (You Don't Love Me No More)" (1961), sung by Marisela
- "Ya No", a song by Selena from Amor Prohibido (1994), covered in 2010 by Dulce María
- "Ya No!", a song by Gloria Trevi from Tu Ángel de la Guarda (1991)
