= Brindo Con Agua =

2024 single by Aventura

Single by Aventura

from the album 2.0
- Released: April 2, 2024
- Genre: Bachata
- Label: Hustlehard Entertainment LLC.
- Songwriters: Anthony "Romeo" Santos; Henry Santos
- Producers: Anthony "Romeo" Santos; Lenny Santos

Henry Santos singles chronology
"Dominicano" (2024)	"Brindo Con Agua" (2024)	"Mi Amuleto" (2024)

Aventura singles chronology
"Volví" (2021)	"Brindo Con Agua" (2024)

"Brindo Con Agua" (I Toast With Water) is a song by American bachata group Aventura. The song was released on April 2, 2024, under Henry Santos' own record label, Hustlehard Entertainment LLC, as the eighth and main single for Henry's sixth studio album, 2.0. It's their first single since 2021, and their first bachata song since 2019. This is also the fifth song and first single in which Henry is the lead vocalist.

== Charts ==
Chart performance for "Brindo Con Agua"
Chart (2024)	Peak position
Dominican Republic Bachata (Monitor Latino)	19
US Latin Digital Song Sales (Billboard)	14
US Latin Airplay (Billboard)	46
US Tropical Airplay (Billboard)	5

== Certifications ==
Certifications for "Brindo Con Agua"
Region	Certification	Certified units/sales
United States (RIAA)	Platinum (Latin)	60,000^{‡}
^{‡} Sales+streaming figures based on certification alone.
