= Mi Amuleto =

Single by Casper Mágico and Henry Santos

from the album Los Mágicos
- Released: December 10, 2024
- Recorded: 2024
- Genre: Bachata
- Length: 3:32
- Label: Los Mágicos LLC & GLAD EMPIRE LLC

Casper Mágico singles chronology
"Hoy Se Perrea" (2024)	"Mi Amuleto" (2024)	"PIKIS" (2025)

Henry Santos singles chronology
"Brindo Con Agua" (2024)	"Mi Amuleto" (2024)	"MILF" (2024)

Music video
- "Mi Amuleto" on YouTube

"Mi Amuleto" (My Amulet) is a song by Puerto Rican rapper Casper Mágico with Dominican singer Henry Santos. It was released as a single on December 10, 2024. The song is part of Mágico's collaboration album, Los Mágicos (2025). The music video was released on the same day as its audio release.

== Charts ==
Chart performance for "Mi Amuleto"
Chart (2024)	Peak position
US Tropical Airplay (Billboard)	23
