= Corazón de Hierro =

"Corazón De Hierro"

Single by Vena featuring Teodoro Reyes and Frank Reyes
- Released: November 12, 2013
- Recorded: 2013
- Genre: Bachata
- Length: 4:07
- Label: Planet Records; Element Music Group

Vena singles chronology
"Sangre De Mis Venas" (2013)	"Corazón De Hierro" (2013)	"It Won't Stop (Bachata Cover)" (2014)

Teodoro Reyes singles chronology
"Mentías" (2013)	"Corazón De Hierro" (2013)	"Si Yo Me Muero" (2014)

Frank Reyes singles chronology
"24 Horas" (2013)	"Corazón De Hierro" (2013)	"Que Hay de Tu Vida" (2014)

"Corazón De Hierro" (English:"Heart of Iron") is a song by Dominican-American bachata trio Vena featuring Dominican singers Teodoro Reyes and Frank Reyes. It was released on November 12, 2013, by Planet Records and Len Melody's Element Music Group.

== Charts ==
Chart (2013)	Peak Position
US Tropical Airplay (Billboard)	5
