= Soleil (singer) =

- Born: Soleil Bermart; May 7, 1983 (age 43); Buenos Aires, Argentina
- Origin: Buenos Aires, Argentina
- Genres: Salsa, pop, electronic
- Occupations: Singer, songwriter, DJ
- Instrument: Voice
- Years active: 2014–present

Soleil Bermart (Buenos Aires, May 7, 1983), better known as Soleil, is an Argentine singer, songwriter and disc jockey. Her single "Pa' la calle" (2019) reached number 31 on Billboard Latin Pop Airplay chart and "No me arrepiento" (2018), a collaboration with Dominican artist Maffio, reached number 29 on the same chart.

== Biography ==
Soleil was born in Buenos Aires, Argentina on May 7, 1983. After receiving her academic training at the Catholic University and the University of Belgrano, she decided to move to Miami, Florida to begin a career as a singer. Initially, she had to work several jobs before becoming a disc jockey. After moving to New York City, she met manager Johnny Falcones, known for his work with artists such as La India, Celia Cruz and Marc Anthony, with whom she began a romantic relationship. With Falcones' help, Soleil released "Despertaré", a song that featured a salsa remix in collaboration with Puerto Rican singer Tito Rojas.

At the beginning of 2018, she released her second single, titled "No me arrepiento", in collaboration with Dominican artist Maffio, with a music video starring Puerto Rican actor Luis Guzmán. On March 23, the song climbed to number 29 on the Billboard Latin Pop Airplay chart, where it remained for eleven consecutive weeks. That same year, she embarked on her first United States tour, visiting cities such as Boston, Miami, and Washington, D.C., as well as performing in countries such as Puerto Rico, Venezuela, Colombia, Argentina, Ecuador, and the Dominican Republic.

After the release of her first full-length album, entitled Domino Effect, on July 12, 2019, her single "Pa' la calle" reached number 31 on the Latin Pop Airplay chart, where it remained for nine weeks. That same year, she participated in the Calibash Las Vegas event at the T-Mobile Arena, where she shared the stage with Maffio. In 2020, Soleil recorded "La vida es un carnaval", a cover of the song by Cuban artist Celia Cruz.

== Discography ==
=== Albums ===
Year	Title	Notes
2018	Domino Effect	Independent

=== Singles ===
Year	Title	Notes
2017	«Despertaré»	
2017	«Despertaré» remix	Ft. Tito Rojas
2018	«No me arrepiento»	Ft. Maffio
2019	«Pa' la calle»	
2020	«La vida es un carnaval»	
