= My Way (Henry Santos song) =

2013 single by Henry Santos

Single by Henry Santos

from the album My Way
- Released: January 9, 2013
- Recorded: 2012
- Genre: Bachata
- Length: 3:50
- Label: Hustle Hard Entertainment; Siente Music; VeneMusic; Universal Music Latino

Henry Santos singles chronology
"Por Nada" (2011)	"My Way" (2013)	"Bésame Siempre" (2013)

Music video
- "My Way" on YouTube

"My Way" is a song by Dominican singer Henry Santos. It was released on January 9, 2013, and served as the first single for his second album My Way (2013). It became Santos's first single to hit number one on the Billboard Tropical Airplay chart. The music video was released on February 14, 2013.

== Charts ==
Chart performance for "My Way"
Chart (2013)	Peak position
US Tropical Airplay (Billboard)	1

== See also ==
- List of Billboard Tropical Airplay number ones of 2013
