= Mambo (Henry Santos song) =

2021 single by Henry Santos

Single by Henry Santos featuring David Kada

from the album Friends & Legends
- Released: July 16, 2021
- Recorded: 2019–2020
- Genre: Bachata
- Length: 3:51
- Label: Hustle Hard Entertainment
- Songwriters: Henry Santos, Christopher Hierro

Henry Santos singles chronology
"Perdón" (2021)	"Mambo" (2021)	"Mi Casa Es Tu Casa" (2021)

David Kada singles chronology
"Fiesta" (2021)	"Mambo" (2021)	"Amantes y Amigos" (2021)

Music video
- "Mambo" on YouTube

"Mambo" is a song by Dominican singer Henry Santos featuring Dominican salsa singer David Kada. It was released as a single on July 16, 2021, and served as the ninth single from Santos's fifth studio album Friends & Legends (2021). The music video was released the day before.

== Charts ==
=== Weekly charts ===
Chart performance for "Mambo"
Chart (2021)	Peak position
US Tropical Airplay (Billboard)	10

=== Year-end charts ===
Chart (2021)	Position
US Tropical Airplay (Billboard)	40
