= Por Nada =

2011 single by Henry Santos

Single by Henry Santos

from the album Introducing Henry Santos
- Language: Spanish
- English title: "For Nothing"
- Released: 2011
- Recorded: 2011
- Genre: Bachata
- Length: 3:56
- Label: Hustle Hard Entertainment, Siente Music & Universal Music Latino

Henry Santos singles chronology
"Poquito A Poquito" (2011)	"Por Nada" (2011)	"My Way" (2013)

Music video
- "Por Nada" on YouTube

"Por Nada" is a song by Dominican singer Henry Santos. It was released in 2011 and served as the second single for his debut album Introducing Henry Santos (2011). The music video was released on February 29, 2012. He also created a musical film to promote the song.

== Charts ==
Chart performance for "Por Nada"
Chart (2011)	Peak position
US Tropical Airplay (Billboard)	16
