= Poquito A Poquito =

2011 single by Henry Santos

Single by Henry Santos

from the album Introducing Henry Santos
- Language: Spanish
- English title: "Little By Little"
- Released: May 2, 2011
- Recorded: 2011
- Genre: Bachata
- Length: 3:42
- Label: Hustle Hard Entertainment, Siente Music & Universal Music Latino

Henry Santos singles chronology
"Poquito A Poquito" (2011)	"Por Nada" (2011)

Music video
- "Poquito A Poquito" on YouTube

"Poquito A Poquito" is a song by Dominican singer Henry Santos. It was released on May 2, 2011, and served as the first single for his debut album Introducing Henry Santos (2011). It also was his debut single as a solo artist. The music video was released on August 2, 2011.

== Charts ==
Chart performance for "Poquito A Poquito"
Chart (2011)	Peak position
US Tropical Airplay (Billboard)	12
