= Friends & Legends =

Studio album by Henry Santos
- Released: May 7, 2021
- Genre: Bachata
- Length: 54:41
- Label: Hustle Hard Entertainment

Henry Santos chronology
Shut Up & Listen (2018)	Friends & Legends (2021)	2.0 (2024)

Singles from Friends & Legends
- 1. "Don Juan & Cupido" Released: May 3, 2019; 2. "Weekend" Released: November 15, 2019; 3. "Como Abeja A La Flor" Released: March 6, 2020; 4. "Traiciónalo Conmigo" Released: May 8, 2020; 5. "I'm So In Love" Released: November 13, 2020; 6. "Brindemos Por Ellas" Released: January 8, 2021; 7. "Gisselle" Released: March 23, 2021; 8. "Perdón" Released: April 30, 2021; 9. "Cuando Vayas Conmigo" Released: May 28, 2021; 10. "Mambo" Released: July 16, 2021; 11. "Mi Casa Es Tu Casa" Released: August 11, 2021; 12. "No Me Tocó Morir Por Ti" Released: October 22, 2021; 13. "Una Mentirita" Released: November 5, 2021; 14. "Bachata & Barra" Released: November 5, 2021; 15. "¿Qué Pensabas?" Released: January 7, 2022

Friends & Legends is the fifth studio album by Dominican singer Henry Santos. Released by his own record label, HustleHard Entertainment on May 7, 2021. This album included features from artist on the rise and artist that Santos considers friends. It also featured guest appearances from legends of the bachata genre like Alexandra from the famous duo Monchy & Alexandra, Joe Veras, Luis Vargas, and Anthony Santos 'El Mayimbe'. It also included the legendary typical merengue artist El Prodigio.

== Singles ==
Even though the album came out in 2021, its first singles came out in 2019. First single was "Don Juan & Cupido" with Anthony Santos released on May 3, 2019. Later on November 15, 2019, he released Weekend with Daniel Santacruz & Lirow. In 2020 he released Como "Abeja A La Flor" with Alexandra La Reina on March 6. On May 8, he released Traiciónalo Conmigo which was his first single by himself and with no featured artist. After releasing 4 more singles, he eventually released the album on May 7, 2021.

After the albums release, he released the remaining tracks as separate singles. all tracks have their own cover art as separate singles. One of the singles titled "Mambo", which is a salsa featuring David Kada, peaked at number 10 in the Billboard Tropical Airplay chart.

== Original released date and delays ==
The album was originally scheduled to be released in May 2020. However, due to the COVID-19 pandemic, he postponed the released date to May 2021. Santos stated in a few interviews that he felt like it wasn't the right time and that's why he had postponed it. He also mentioned that the song "Una Mentirita", which featured the supreme king Luis Vargas, wasn't originally in the album due to the song not being finished. However, because of the album's released date being delayed, he was able to finish the song with Vargas and was able to add it to the album.

== Track listing ==
No.	Title	Length
1.	"Gisselle"	3:30
2.	"Cuando Vayas Conmigo"	3:21
3.	"Don Juan & Cupido" (featuring Anthony Santos 'El Mayimbe')	3:45
4.	"Mambo" (featuring David Kada)	3:51
5.	"Una Mentirita" (featuring Luis Vargas)	3:36
6.	"Perdón" (featuring Grupo Extra)	3:57
7.	"Weekend" (featuring Daniel Santacruz & Lirow)	3:47
8.	"No Me Tocó Morir Por Ti" (featuring Joe Veras)	3:36
9.	"Brindemos Por Ellas" (featuring Ronny Mercedes)	3:38
10.	"Traiciónalo Conmigo"	3:44
11.	"Como Abeja A La Flor" (featuring Alexandra La Reina)	3:51
12.	"Mi Casa Es Tu Casa" (featuring V Of Vossae & Adam Nazar)	2:48
13.	"Bachata & Barra"	3:51
14.	"¿Qué Pensabas?"	3:35
15.	"I'm So In Love" (featuring El Prodigio)	3:40
Total length:		54:41
