= Y Eres Tan Bella =

2015 single by Henry Santos

Single by Henry Santos

from the album The Third
- Released: August 25, 2015
- Recorded: 2015
- Genre: Bachata
- Length: 3:33
- Label: Hustle Hard Entertainment
- Songwriters: Jose E. Torres-Nuñez, Henry Santos

Henry Santos singles chronology
"La Vida" (2014)	"Y Eres Tan Bella" (2015)	"Quédate" (2016)

Music video
- "Y Eres Tan Bella" on YouTube

"Y Eres Tan Bella" (And You Are So Beautiful) is a song by Dominican singer Henry Santos . It was released on August 25, 2015, and served as the first single for his third album The Third (2016). The music video was released on October 16, 2015.

== Charts ==
Chart performance for "Y Eres Tan Bella"
Chart (2015)	Peak position
US Tropical Airplay (Billboard)	23
