= Bésame Siempre =

2013 single by Henry Santos

Single by Henry Santos

from the album My Way
- Released: May 2013
- Recorded: 2012
- Genre: Bachata
- Length: 4:02
- Label: Hustle Hard Entertainment; Siente Music; VeneMusic; Universal Music Latino

Henry Santos singles chronology
"My Way" (2013)	"Bésame Siempre" (2013)	"La Vida" (2014)

Music video
- "Bésame Siempre" on YouTube

"Bésame Siempre" (Kiss Me Always) is a song by Dominican singer Henry Santos. It was released in 2013 and served as the second single for his second album My Way (2013).

== Charts ==
Chart performance for "Bésame Siempre"
Chart (2013)	Peak position
US Tropical Airplay (Billboard)	11
