= Henry Santos =

Dominican musical artist

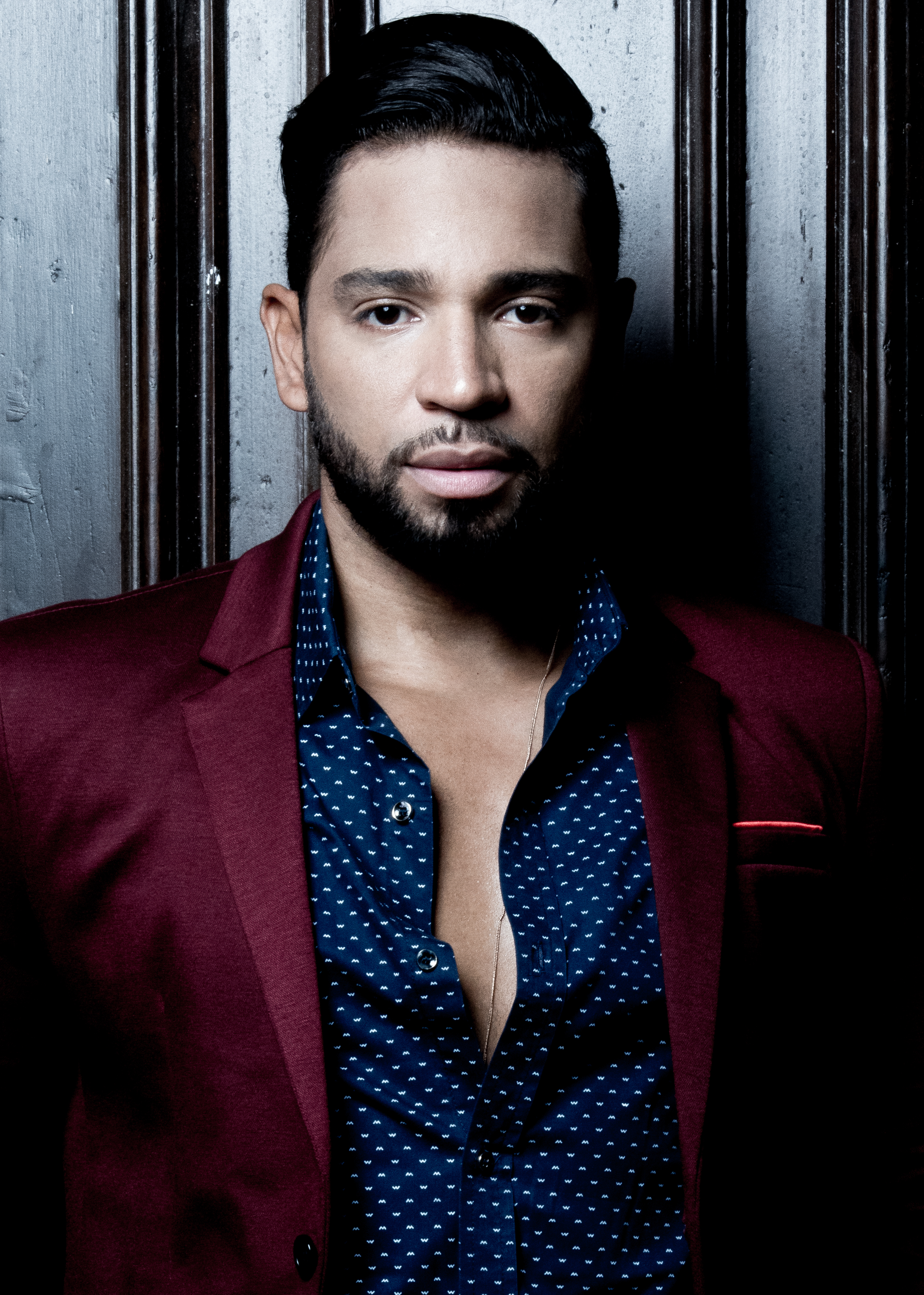
- Henry Santos in 2016

Background information
- Born: Henry Santos; December 15, 1979 (age 46); Moca, Dominican Republic
- Genres: Bachata; R&B
- Occupations: Singer; songwriter; actor; record producer
- Years active: 1993–present
- Labels: Premium Latin; Hustle Hard; Siente; Universal Latin
- Member of: Aventura
- Website: Henry Santos online

Henry Santos Jeter (born Henry Santos; December 15, 1979) is a Dominican singer, songwriter, and producer. Best known for his tenure as a singer and songwriter in the bachata group Aventura. During his time with the group, he produced, wrote and was the lead singer in the songs "9:15", "Déjà Vu", "Voy Malacostumbrado", and Princesita as well as being the background vocalist in most tracks. He made his debut as a solo artist in 2011. Since then, he has released hit singles like "Poquito A Poquito", "Por Nada", "My Way", "La Vida", among others. Santos has released 7 studio albums and 1 live album. He has been featured in other songs with other artist, including Bad Bunny, Anthony Santos & Pavel Núñez. He is also a dancer, actor and art designer.

== Early life ==
Santos was born in 1979, in Moca, Espaillat, Dominican Republic. He moved with his family to the Bronx, New York, aged 13. He is the cousin of bachata star Romeo Santos, with whom he co-founded Los Tinellers in 1994 in what would later become the group known today as Aventura. When he was 17, he became an American citizen and then changed his last name from Santos, which now is his middle name, to Jeter. Santos explained that the Yankees are his favorite baseball team. At the time, Derek Jeter had just started and Santos was so hyped about him to the point that he legally changed his name to Henry Santos Jeter.

== Music career ==
=== Early career, Los Tinellers, and Aventura (1994–2011) ===
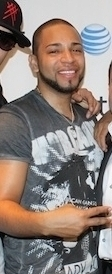
Santos in 2011 with Aventura

Henry was a singer, songwriter, and producer for the Aventura. He formed the group in 1994 with his cousin Anthony "Romeo" Santos, and friends Lenny Santos "Len Melody", and Max Santos "Mikey a.k.a. Max Agende". Romeo and Henry met Lenny and Max in 1993. The following year, they formed a band and called themselves Los Tinellers. In 1995 they met a man by the name of Elvin Polanco who would eventually manage and help them record their first album titled Trampa de Amor. Polanco went through some health problems which ended things between him and the group. Later on they met Julio César García, who would become their manager and would re-invent them as Aventura. In 1998, they signed with Premium Latin Music with Franklin Romero.

Aventura released their debut album in 1999 titled Generation Next with the hopes of bringing bachata into the mainstream from its traditional base and fuse it with hip hop and R&B. The album included the single "Cuándo Volverás", which is one of their signature songs. In 2002, the song "Obsesión" achieved huge success in many countries, topping many international charts in France, Germany and Italy. It was part of their second album, We Broke the Rules. Aventura released three more studio albums and three live albums in a decade, spawning many top 10 internationally famous hits. Henry was mostly a back-up singer and mostly danced when he was on stage. He has also been the lead vocalist for the songs "9:15", "Deja Vu", "Voy Mal Acostumbrado", and "Princesita". After breaking multiple records and selling out arenas and stadiums, the group split in 2011 to work on separate projects. This would give Henry the chance to show that he had more to offer.

=== Going solo, Signing with Siente Music, Introducing, and My Way (2011–2014) ===
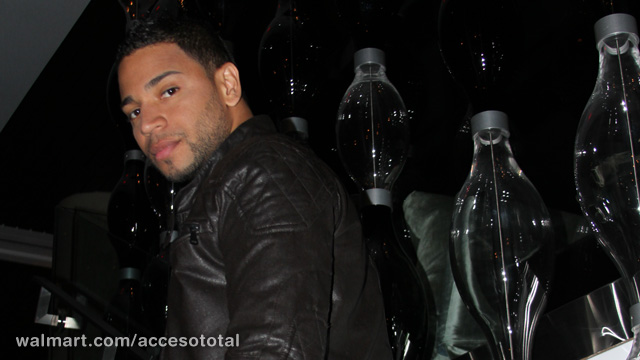
Santos in Accesso Total in 2011

In 2011, after his success with Aventura, he would start a solo career while the rest of the members would also work on separate projects. He would eventually sign with Siente Music which was associated with both Venemusic & Universal Music Group. On May 2, 2011, Santos released his debut single "Poquito A Poquito". It would become the first and main single for his solo debut album. The song peaked at number 12 on the Billboard Tropical Airplay chart. On October 4, 2011, Santos released his debut solo album, Introducing Henry Santos. It debuted at number 2 on the Billboard Tropical Albums Chart. Hits such as "Poquito A Poquito", "Por Amor (Mi Fiel Fanatica)" and "Por Nada", which peaked at number 16 on the Billboard Tropical Airplay chart, were favorites among worldwide bachata listeners.

On January 9, 2013, he released the first single off his second album, "My Way", which gave the name of the second album. It became Santos's first number 1 hit on the Billboard Tropical Airplay chart. In May 2013, he released the second single titled "Bésame Siempre". It peaked at number 11 on the Billboard Tropical Airplay chart. On June 25, 2013, Santos released his second studio album My Way. It was released under exclusive licensing to VeneMusic & Universal Music Group, executive produced by HustleHard Ent. The album featured collaborations with El Adictivo Sonido L.A.X., Bobby Pulido, Maffio, and Natti Natasha. On April 14, 2014, TR3S launched an exclusive campaign featuring Henry Santos's third video La Vida, in collaboration with Latin Grammy award winning producer Maffio. The song would peak at number 1 on the Billboard Tropical Airplay chart. On July 12, 2014, Henry reunited with his old bandmates Lenny, Max, & Romeo for a surprise Aventura reunion to close out Romeo's second night of his historic sold out concert at Yankee Stadium.

=== Going independent, Aventura Reunion, The Third, live album, and Shut Up & Listen (2015–2018) ===
In 2015, Siente Music closed down. The label gave Henry all the masters of his songs. Henry continued as an independent solo artist under his own record label HustleHard Entertainment LLC and continued to release more projects. On August 25, 2015, he released the first single for his third album "Y Eres Tan Bella". It is also the first single after Santos was no longer with Siente Music. It peaked at number 23 on the Billboard Tropical Airplay chart.

On December 1, 2015, it was announce that Aventura would reunite to have a series of concerts for the whole month of February 2016 at the United Palace Theater in New York City. Their first concert since their split began in front of a sold-out crowd on February 4, 2016. During the reunion, he released the lyric video of the second single for his third solo album titled "Quédate" on February 11, 2016. He released it as an audio single on 8 days later. It peaked at number 22 on the Billboard Tropical Airplay chart. The final concert with the group was on February 28, 2016. Two month later, he released his third album Henry The Third Deluxe on April 8, 2016. It debuted at #7 in the iTunes digital charts. The album featured collaborations with Jhoni The Voice, Leoni Torres, Maffio, and Gente De Zona.

On February 24, 2017, he released his first live solo album The Live Album: Sólo Éxitos. This is a live album compilation of Henry Santos's best songs. It also includes all the songs that included his voice from his time in Aventura. On January 26, 2018, he released his first single for his fourth studio album titled Descarados. On March 9, 2018, he released its second single titled Tu Ego. On March 30, 2018, he released its third single titled Algo Estúpido. On June 1, 2018, he released his fourth studio album Shut Up & Listen. On December 14, 2018, the song "Aún No Es Tarde" was released as the album's fourth single. He released an acoustic version of the song on December 21, 2018.

=== Friends & Legends, Karaoke albums, and Aventura reunion tour (2019–2021) ===
On February 8, 2019, Santos released a karaoke album titled Reto: Canta Con Henry Santos Vol.1. He released it as a challenge for fans to sing like him. On April 5, 2019, he reunited with the group once again to release their first song since 2009, "Inmortal". It was released as the lead single for Romeo's fourth studio album. On the Billboard charts it peaked at 95 on the Billboard Hot 100, at number 5 on Hot Latin Songs, and at number 1 on both Latin and Tropical Airplay charts.The first singles for Santos's fifth studio album were released in 2019. On May 3, 2019 he released "Don Juan & Cupido" with Anthony "El Mayimbe" Santos as the first single for his fifth studio album.

On September 21. 2019, he reunited again with the group at his cousin Romeo's sold out concert at MetLife Stadium to close the show. On November 15, 2019 he released "Weekend" with Daniel Santacruz & Lirow as the second single for his fifth studio album. Later that year Aventura announced the Inmortal Tour. On January 24, 2020, he released the sequel to his first karaoke album Reto: Canta Con Henry Santos Vol.2 (Los Clásicos). From February to March 2020, Aventura tour around the United States until the COVID-19 pandemic. Shows were cancelled and the group wasn't able to finish the tour. Henry would continue working on his album. In 2020, he would continue with the release of the third single, "Como Abeja A La Flor" with Alexandra on March 6. The album was originally set to be released in May 2020. However, due to the COVID-19 pandemic, he decided to postpone the release date. Meanwhile, he released 5 more singles between 2020 and 2021 before the album's release.

On May 7, 2021, he released his fifth studio album Friends & Legends. The album featured collaborations with multiple Bachata artist. Colleagues & newcomers of the genre including Lirow, Daniel Santacruz and Grupo Extra, as well as legends of the genre such as Anthony Santos, Luis Vargas, Joe Veras, and Alexandra. This also included Dominican salsa singer David Kada for the salsa song "Mambo" which features. It peaked at number #10 on the Billboard Tropical Airplay chart. It also featured Merengue Legend, El Prodigio in the merengue song, "I'm So In Love". It also featured Ronny Mercedes who was a participant of the American Spanish-language singing competition television series, La Voz.

In June 2021, Aventura announced the return of the Inmortal Tour. But instead of doing the shows in the venues that were originally planned before their cancelation, they decided to play at stadiums and big arenas in certain cities. Before the tour started, the group released the single Volví on August 3, 2021, featuring Bad Bunny. On August 14, the tour started in Miami, Florida at Hard Rock Stadium. They became the first Latin act to ever sell out the stadium. The last concert of the tour was on October 9, 2021, at Metlife Stadium in New Jersey. Their last 2 shows together were on December 18 and 19, 2021, Félix Sánchez Olympic Stadium in Santo Domingo, Dominican Republic. Both shows were a huge success as they were sold-out.

=== 2.0, Urban Bolero, and final reunion with Aventura (2022–2025) ===
After the Inmortal Tour, Henry return to continue with his solo career and began working on his sixth studio album. On February 4, 2022, he released the bachata version of "Te Di" with Pavel Núñez as the album's first single. "Te Di" is originally a pop song by Pavel Núñez from his 2012 album Paso A Paso. On May 20, 2022, he released "Cuando Te Toco" with Bachata duo JFab and Paola Fabre. The music video was released on May 27, 2022, and currently has 2.2 million views on YouTube.

In 2023, Henry Santos would start doing Bolero with an urban touch to it, thus calling it Urban Bolero. On March 17, 2023, he released the first single under this genre titled "Me Dejó". The music video was released on March 31, 2023. On May 26, 2023, he released "Nesesitaba Decirlo". On August 25, 2023, he released two versions of the single "La Excepción". One by himself, and a duet version with Dominican bachata singer Kiko Rodríguez. On October 6, 2023, he released the bachata single "No Soy Nada Sin Ti" with Frank Reyes. The music videos for both "La Excepción" and "No Soy Nada Sin Ti" are part of a series involving romance and boxing. "La Excepción" (solo version) was episode one while the one for the following single is episode 2. On February 27, 2024, he released the merengue single titled "Dominicano" ("Dominican"), with Dominican merengue band, Urbanda. The song was release to celebrate Dominican Independence Day.

On February 25, 2024, Henry's cousin, Romeo, posted a social media story about something that he was going to post the next day. The next day, Henry, along with the other members of the group, posted a video that indicated that they were back. The following day, they announced dates for their tour, Cerrando Ciclos, which is considered the group's final tour. On April 2, 2024, they released their first single since 2021 and first bachata song since 2019, "Brindo Con Agua". It was released under Henry's record label Hustlehard Entertainment LLC. It is also the fifth song and first single from the group in which Henry is the lead vocalist. This is the second Aventura song to be featured in one of the members solo projects instead of an album by the group as it is the eighth and lead single for Henry's sixth studio album, 2.0. The album was released on May 31, 2024. The tour started on the first of the same month as the album's release. Henry continued touring with the group until their final show at the Félix Sánchez Olympic Stadium in Santo Domingo, Dominican Republic, on January 5, 2025.

=== After The Noise (Lado A) (2026–present) ===
On September 4, 2026, Santos released his seventh studio album, After The Noise (Lado A). It includes the singles "Lo Que No Nace", "1ra. Cita", and "Leyendas", which features his Aventura band mates Lenny and Max Santos.

== Acting ==
Henry Santos have make cameos in two successful Dominican movies, Sanky Panky and La Soga. Santos was the music supervisor of La Soga. He also hosted a fictional radio station called San Juan sounds in the Grand Theft Auto IV's second expansion episode pack, Grand Theft Auto: The Ballad of Gay Tony. He is the lead actor in Por Nada, A Musical Film, a 30-minute short film linked to the second single "Por Nada" of his Introducing Henry Santos solo debut album.

== Mira Quien Baila ==
In September 2012, it was announced that Henry Santos would be the first dancer from the Dominican Republic involved in the third season of Mira Quien Baila, Univision's Spanish version of Dancing with the Stars. He would be competing in support of the National Latino Children's institute. Week after week, Santos dominated every challenge given to him on the dance floor. The dances ranged from Hip-Hop and Salsa, to Tango and Quickstep. Not only did Santos dominate the dance floor, but his charm and charisma heavily attracted the fans, which made the third season of Mira Quien Baila the highest rated season in history. Santos made it to the finale without ever being nominated for elimination, setting a new record for the show. Mira Quien Baila's finale aired November 18, 2012. The episode was seen by over seven million people worldwide. Santos was crowned by the fans "El Rey de la Pista" (King of the Dance Floor) with over 41% of the votes against Alicia Machado and Fernando Arau.

Awards and achievements
Preceded by (Puerto Rico) Adamari Lopez	Mira Quien Baila winner 2012	Succeeded by (Puerto Rico) Johnny Lozada

== Community work ==
Competing in Mira Quien Baila, Henry Santos represented the National Latino Children's institute as support for the organization. But that was no't his only contribution in terms of community work.

On May 6, 2014, Santos partnered up with NYC Presbyterian Hospital & Columbia University in the fight against child obesity in the United States with their community program "Vive Tu Vida" by CHALK, offering a healthy alternatives menu in restaurants all over NYC and educating Latinos on recommended portion sizes for foods, the benefits of exercising and a healthier lifestyle. Subsequently, Santos represented his foundation in the popular Telemundo cooking competition Top Chef Estrellas with the purpose of spreading the message.

On May 14, 2014, Santos was named the "Padrino" (Godfather) of the Latino Commission on AIDS in the United States, helping spread the word among Latin people on the fight against this illness. Subsequently, his voice and image were used on the CDC & MTV's Tr3s Campaign, "Una Conversation A La Vez" ("One Conversation at a Time"), educating Latin people on the prevention of HIV/AIDS.

== Discography ==
=== Studio albums ===
- Introducing Henry Santos (2011)
- My Way (2013)
- The Third (2016)
- Shut Up & Listen (2018)
- Friends & Legends (2021)
- 2.0 (2024)
- After The Noise (Lado A) (2026)
- After The Noise (Lado B) (TBA)

=== Live albums ===
- The Live Album: Sólo Éxitos (2017)

=== Karaoke albums ===
- Reto: Canta Con Henry Santos, Vol.1 (2019)
- Reto: Canta Con Henry Santos, Vol.2 (Los Clásicos) (2020)

=== Singles ===
Year	Single	Chart positions	Album	Certifications
Year	Single	U.S. Tropical Airplay	Album	Certifications
2011	"Poquito A Poquito"	12	Introducing Henry Santos	
2011	"Por Nada"	16	Introducing Henry Santos	
2011	"Por Amor" (Mi Fiel Fanatica)	—	Introducing Henry Santos	
2013	"My Way"	1	My Way	
2013	"Bésame Siempre"	11	My Way	
2014	La Vida (featuring Maffio)	1	My Way	
2015	"Y Eres Tan Bella"	23	The Third	
2016	"Quédate"	22	The Third	
2016	"Cuídame"	—	The Third	
2017	"Si Me Besa Tu Boca" (Solo or with Leoni Torres)	—	The Third	
2018	"Descarados"	—	Shut Up & Listen	
2018	"Tu Ego"	—	Shut Up & Listen	
2018	"Algo Estúpido"	—	Shut Up & Listen	
2018	"Aún No Es Tarde"	—	Shut Up & Listen	
2019	"Don Juan & Cupido" (with Antony Santos)	—	Friends & Legends	
2019	"Weekend" (with Daniel Santacruz & Lirow)	—	Friends & Legends	
2020	"Como Abeja A La Flor" (with Alexandra La Reina)	—	Friends & Legends	
2020	"Traiciónalo Conmigo"	—	Friends & Legends	
2020	"I'm So In Love" (with El Prodigio)	—	Friends & Legends	
2021	"Brindemos Por Ellas" (with Ronny Mercedes)	—	Friends & Legends	
2021	"Gisselle"	—	Friends & Legends	
2021	"Perdón" (with Grupo Extra)	—	Friends & Legends	
2021	"Cuando Vayas Conmigo"	—	Friends & Legends	
2021	"Mambo" (with David Kada)	10	Friends & Legends	
2021	"Mi Casa Es Tu Casa" (with V Of Vossae & Adam Nazar)	—	Friends & Legends	
2021	"No Me Tocó Morir Por Ti" (with Joe Veras)	—	Friends & Legends	
2021	"Una Mentirita" (with Luis Vargas)	—	Friends & Legends	
2021	"Bachata & Barra"	—	Friends & Legends	
2022	"¿Qué Pensabas?"	—	Friends & Legends	
2022	"Te Di" (Bachata Version) (with Pavel Núñez)	—	2.0	
2022	"Cuando Te Toco" (with JFab and Poala Fabre)	—	2.0	
2023	"Me Dejó"	—	2.0	
2023	"Nesesitaba Decirlo"	—	2.0	
2023	"La Excepción" (Solo and Duet Version with Kiko Rodríguez)	—	2.0	
2023	"No Soy Nada Sin Ti" (with Frank Reyes)	—	2.0	
2024	"Dominicano" (with Urbanda)	—	2.0	
2024	"Brindo Con Agua" (with Aventura)	5	2.0	RIAA: Platinum (Latin)
2024	"Mi Amuleto" (with Casper Mágico)	23	Los Mágicos	
2025	"MILF" (with Inti & Vicente)	—	Non-album single	
2026	"Lo Que No Nace"	—	After The Noise (Lado A)	
2026	"1ra. Cita"	—	After The Noise (Lado A)	
2026	"Leyendas" (featuring Lenny Santos and Max Santos The Thunder)	—	After The Noise (Lado A)	
"—" denotes a title that was not released or did not chart in that territory
