= Shut Up & Listen =

Studio album by Henry Santos
- Released: June 1, 2018
- Genre: Bachata
- Length: 35:00
- Label: Hustle Hard Entertainment

Henry Santos chronology
| The Live Album: Sólo Éxitos (2017) | Shut Up & Listen (2018) | Friends & Legends (2021) |

Singles from Shut Up & Listen
- 1. "Descarados" Released: January 26, 2018; 2. "Tu Ego" Released: March 9, 2018; 3. "Algo Estúpido" Released: March 30, 2018; 4. "Aún No Es Tarde" Released: December 14, 2018

Shut Up & Listen is the fourth studio album by Dominican singer Henry Santos. Released by his own record label, HustleHard Entertainment on June 1, 2018. The title was inspired by an advice that Santos's received from his grandmother about abstaining from shouting during a couple's heated arguments. Santos said that this album is the most personal to him. He also mentioned that each song is like advise for couples. The album is like a manual for couples. This production features the singles "Descarados", "Tu Ego", and Algo Estúpido.

== Track listing ==
| No. | Title | Length |
|---|---|---|
| 1. | "Once Mil Cosas" | 3:31 |
| 2. | "Algo Estúpido" | 3:04 |
| 3. | "Tu Ego" | 3:45 |
| 4. | "Descarados" | 3:03 |
| 5. | "Eres La Razón" | 3:41 |
| 6. | "Aún No Es Tarde" | 3:35 |
| 7. | "Mañanitas" | 3:24 |
| 8. | "Mi Ex" | 3:40 |
| 9. | "Ya Somos Tres" | 3:28 |
| 10. | "Shut Up & Listen (Calla & Escucha)" | 3:45 |
| Total length: | | 35:00 |
