= Introducing Henry Santos =

Studio album by Henry Santos
- Released: October 4, 2011
- Recorded: 2011
- Genre: Bachata
- Length: 48:10
- Labels: Hustle Hard Entertainment, Siente Music & Universal Music Latino

Henry Santos chronology
Introducing Henry Santos (2011)	My Way (2013)

Singles from Introducing Henry Santos
- 1. "Poquito A Poquito" Released: May 2, 2011; 2. "Por Nada" Released: 2011

Introducing Henry Santos or Introducing is the debut album by bachata singer Henry Santos. It is Santos's first album as a solo artist following the break-up of American bachata group Aventura, of which he was a backup singer and mostly the dancer of the group. This is also the first album in which he's the lead singer to every song. When he was with the group, he rarely was the lead vocalist. This album showcased his singing, especially with his first single, "Poquito A Poquito", in which peaked number 12 in the Billboard Tropical Airplay chart. Its second single, "Por Nada", peaked number 16 in the same chart.

== Track listing ==
No.	Title	Length
1.	"Poquito A Poquito"	3:42
2.	"Flippin' Channels" (Skit)	0:56
3.	"Deja De Llorar" (Mi Desprecio)	3:19
4.	"Por Nada"	3:56
5.	"Mi Adiccion"	3:32
6.	"No Me Consuela"	4:44
7.	"Amarte Ha Sido Tan Facil" (featuring Christian Castro)	4:07
8.	"Yeah.. Your Girl" (Skit)	1:40
9.	"Gotcha"	3:44
10.	"Bella En Italiano"	4:09
11.	"Por Amor" (Mi Fiel Fanatica)	3:41
12.	"Amantes"	3:50
13.	"Dame Una Sonrisa"	3:31
14.	"Una Cita" (Outro)	3:30
Total length:		48:10

== Charts ==
=== Weekly charts ===
Chart (2011)	Peak Position
US Heatseekers Albums (Billboard)	32
US Top Latin Albums (Billboard)	15
US Tropical Albums (Billboard)	2

=== Year-end charts ===
Chart (2012)	Position
US Tropical Albums (Billboard)	20
