= Arthur Hanlon =

- Origin: Detroit, Michigan, US
- Genres: instrumental; Latin pop fusion
- Occupations: Composer; pianist
- Instrument: Piano
- Years active: 2001–present
- Labels: Fonovisa Records (2001–2005); EMI Records (2006); Universal Latin (2009–2013); Sony Latin (present)
- Website: arthurhanlon.com; Youtube: facebook.com/ArthurHanlonMusic; twitter.com/arthurhanlon

Arthur Hanlon is an American pianist, songwriter, and arranger renowned in Latin music with multiple hits on the Billboard charts and in collaborations with Latin music's biggest names. Born to Irish American parents, Hanlon is from Detroit. He found his calling in Latin music and has received widespread recognition there, becoming the first pianist to reach the Billboard Latin airplay charts in more than a decade and the first to have a No. 1 on Billboard's Tropical Airplay chart. Hanlon's most recent release is 2 Manos 1 Mundo, a series of original collaborations with stars including Angela Aguilar, Carlos Vives, Ana Barbara, Tiago Iorc, and Manuel Medrano.

The album has already generated multiple hits including official Zumba track "Repetimos" with Cuban rapper Yotuel and Puerto Rican rapper Darell, and "Bala Perdida," a Mexican ballad featuring Mexican American singer Angela Aguilar on vocals which premiered at the 2025 edition of Premio Lo Nuestro on Univision. He is an exclusive Yamaha Pianos artist.

In November 2022, Hanlon released Piano y Mujer II, an album and HBO Max special which features guests including reggaetón legend Ivy Queen, Mexican power duo Ha*Ash, Colombian singer Catalina García of Monsieur Periné, Costa Rican singer/songwriter Debi Nova and Mexican powerhouse Lupita Infante. Piano y Mujer 2 is the follow-up to 2020's Piano y Mujer (Sony Music), an album and HBOMax special that features Hanlon performing with five Latin stars: Natalia Jimenez, Evaluna Montaner, Kany Garcia, Nella and Goyo of Colombian group ChocQuibTown. The album's singles like "Hallelujah," by Leonard Cohen are performed alongside Montaner. Both specials aired simultaneously on HBO and HBOMax in the United States and Latin America.

A Magical Christmas Piano, his third consecutive Christmas special was released in 2022 with a companion EP. The project came out after the Christmas special and EP, A Holiday Christmas Piano, which has been viewed over 20 million times exclusively on Facebook.

Prior to Piano y Mujer, in 2017 Hanlon released "No Tuve La Culpa" with Chocquibtown. The video features him playing piano on the back of a moving semi truck along with Chocquibtown through the mountains of Colombia. In 2018 "Aura" (Ozuna featuring Arthur Hanlon) was released and the video has received more than 46 million views. In 2019 Hanlon released "Si Tu Te Vas" (with Fonseca), Balada Para Adelina and "Como Suena El Piano" with the Cuban hiphop group Orishas. The iconic video was filmed in Cuba and celebrates the musical cross culturalism which is prevalent in all of Hanlon’s work. His debut project with Sony was Viajero, a CD and DVD documenting his travels through eight countries—Argentina, Colombia, Brazil, Italy, Portugal, Spain, Mexico, and Cuba. He recorded at every stop an iconic Latin track from the respective country with the best studio musicians to be found in each location and his travels were documented by a traveling film crew. Viajero mini-docs premiered on American Airlines flights and the album Viajero, the first for Hanlon on Sony Music Latin, was released in mid-2016. The documentary became a Telemundo special.

Prior to Viajero, Hanlon released Encanto del Caribe, a CD and DVD of a live concert performance filmed at the historic Castillo San Cristobal in San Juan, Puerto Rico featuring Hanlon on piano with several guest artists: Marc Anthony, Laura Pausini, Natalia Jiménez, Cheo Feliciano, Bernie Williams, and Ana Isabelle (she does not appear on both the DVD and CD but is credited on both). Encanto del Caribe was produced as a special for public television and has aired throughout the United States. The album, out on Universal Music Latin, spent five weeks on the top 10 of Billboard's Latin Pop Albums charts. The making of Encanto del Caribe marked the first time ever that filming took place in San Cristobal Castle, a federal monument.

== History ==
The third of seven children, Hanlon began playing the piano at six and at 15, was already playing professional gigs in Detroit with ensembles which included the Flip Jackson Band. He studied at piano at Michigan State University in East Lansing and eventually received a master's degree in piano performance from Manhattan School of Music in Manhattan, New York. While in New York City, he encountered Latin music and regularly played Latin club gigs while at the same time studying the music of classical composers.

Hanlon's first album was an independent recording of purely original material, appropriately titled Encuentros. Licensed by Max Music and distributed by Universal, Encuentros brought Hanlon to the attention of Fonovisa Records, the leading indie Latin label in the country at the time, with whom he signed in 2000.

Hanlon's first release with Fonovisa Records was El Piano Amarillo (The Yellow Piano) an eclectic mix of Latin, dance and pop fare produced by Colombian producers Estéfano and Julio Reyes (of Marc Anthony and Jennifer Lopez fame). 11 Números Uno came out next, a more classically-tinged album of covers of Latin standards plus one of his original compositions. He established himself as an instrumentalist with 2005's La Gorda Linda, an album of mostly original material which featured jazz trumpeter Arturo Sandoval, salsa star Tito Nieves, and Mexican singer Ana Bárbara as guest stars. The album was produced by Grammy winners Sergio George and Kike Santander and was a multiple finalist for the 2006 Billboard Latin Music Awards, in which Hanlon performed.

In 2006, Hanlon was signed by EMI, and released Mecanomanía, an album of covers of Spanish pop trio Mecano, set to chill-out arrangements. The video for the album's first single, "Hijo de la Luna," was shot at the Baldwin piano factory, marking the first time in the company's nearly 100-year history that a music video was shot in its installations. In 2009, Hanlon signed to Universal Latin. His first album under the label was "Piano Sin Fronteras" which Hanlon wrote or co-wrote in its entirety and features collaborations with some of the top names in Latin music, including Colombian rock star Juanes, Italian diva Laura Pausini, Sergio Vallín—guitarist for rock group Maná, Brazilian superstar Alexandre Pires, Venezuelan icon Ricardo Montaner, pop star Luis Fonsi and Chilean singer Myriam Hernandez.

Hanlon has also recorded several Christmas singles that have been used for different campaigns. "Esta Navidad," which Hanlon wrote in 2008 and which features Puerto Rican singer Janina on vocals, was used by Univision for their Christmas on-air campaign in several markets including Miami, New York, and Chicago. The song was also released as a single to radio. In 2010, Hanlon wrote and recorded a second Christmas single, "Navidad, Navidad," which he recorded with Venezuelan duo Chino y Nacho and Mexican singer Dulce Maria on vocals. The song is a Spanish version adaptation of Jingle Bells. It was also used by Univision for its Christmas campaign on several major Latin markets. He also participated in the 2019 remake of the hit "Un Ano Mas," redone with Carlos Rivera and Natalia Jimenez, among others.

In 2011, Hanlon traveled to San Juan, Puerto Rico to film "Encanto del Caribe" at Castillo San Cristóbal. The show was being filmed as a special for public television. Hanlon's guests included Marc Anthony, Laura Pausini, Natalia Jimenez, Bernie Williams, Cheo Feliciano, and Ana Isabelle. Hanlon performed on his blue grand piano accompanied by a 40-piece orchestra conducted by Puerto Rican arranger and conductor Cucco Pena. The special was produced by SBS Entertainment, a U.S.-based Latin media company and funded by the Puerto Rican government. The CD/DVD "Encanto del Caribe" was released in August, 2012 by Universal Music Latino.

In 2016, Hanlon signed with Sony Music Latin and embarked on an ambitious video/audio project where he filmed and recorded iconic Latin songs from seven countries: Spain, Portugal, Mexico, Argentina, Brazil, Colombia, and the U.S.

== Musical highlights ==
With his 2005 hit, "La Gorda Linda," Hanlon became the first pianist, and the first non-Latin, to reach No. 1 on the tropical airplay chart of Billboard Magazine, according to an article published by Billboard on April 26, 2006, coinciding with the Billboard Latin Music Awards. Hanlon was the first pianist to enter the Billboard Latin charts in more than a decade, according to the magazine. "La Gorda Linda," which he penned, was also on the top ten of the "Billboard Top Latin Songs" chart and a subsequent remix by DJ Norty Cotto spent weeks on the Billboard dance charts. As a result of "La Gorda Linda," Hanlon was a double finalist for the 2006 Latin Billboard Music Awards in the Tropical Song of the year and Dance Track of the year categories.

In a memorable moment, Hanlon played "No Me Llames Extranjero," a song about immigrants, with Fonsi and Montaner during the 2006 Latin Billboard Music Awards which aired on Telemundo. Hanlon was nominated for a Emmy Award for his jingle "Esta Navidad" (This Christmas), based on his single of the same name, which was picked up by Univision as its Christmas jingle and spot for 2008. Also established in the mainstream instrumental space, he was a featured guest on pianist Jim Brickman's "Beautiful World" CD and PBS special and toured the U.S. with Italian star Laura Pausini in 2009.

Hanlon returned to the Billboard charts in the Summer of 2009 with "Ya Te Olvide," a single from "Piano Sin Fronteras" featuring Ricardo Montaner. To date, Hanlon has had four major label releases, all under Latin labels, making him an anomaly in the pop music world. Aside from his own albums, his history of recorded collaborations includes Gloria Estefan (in her album "Unwrapped"), Arturo Sandoval (with whom he recorded "Marianela," from Hanlon's album "La Gorda Linda"), Crooked Stylo (with whom he co-wrote the track "Don Miguel," from the album "Malhablados"), Prince Royce with whom he recorded "Dulce;" and Natalie Cole who featured him on her version of "Oye como va." Hanlon also composed and produced "La Gota de la Vida" (The Drop of Life), a song recorded by 46 artists to benefit Cancer Research Center City of Hope and whose video was directed by Simon Brand.

== La Gota de la Vida (The Drop of Life) ==
In 2010, Hanlon was asked to write a song in Spanish to be used by cancer center City of Hope to raise awareness about the importance of bone marrow donation. He penned "La Gota de la Vida" (The Drop of Life) recording it with Enrique Iglesias, Gloria Estefan, Franco de Vita, David Bisbal, Jenni Rivera, Oscar D'Leon, Gilberto Santa Rosa, Luis Fonsi, Marco Antonio Solis and more stars. A video, directed by Colombian video and film director Simon Brand, was shot in several U.S. cities including Miami and Las Vegas. "La Gota de la Vida" officially premiered at the Nokia Theatre in Los Angeles with a live performance featuring Hanlon on piano and several of the artists who sang on the video.

== Encanto del Caribe ==
Hanlon's last project for Universal was "Encanto del Caribe" (Caribbean Fantasy), a live concert recorded at historic San Cristobal Castle in Puerto Rico with guest artists Marc Anthony, Laura Pausini, Natalia Jimenez, New York Yankee great Bernie Williams on the guitar, Cheo Feliciano, and Ana Isabelle (though she does not appear on both the DVD and CD but credited on both). A UNESCO World Heritage Site, San Cristobal allowed filming inside its premises for the first time in history with "Encanto del Caribe." The special aired on public television stations across the United States and a CD/DVD was released by Universal August 21, 2012. "Encanto del Caribe" features original instrumental recordings composed by Hanlon as well as Latin standards. The album was produced by Grammy winner Julio Reyes Copello and the show was directed by Puerto Rican bandleader Cucco Pena. Memorable moments in the special include Hanlon's performance of Puerto RIcan classic "En Mi Viejo San Juan" with superstar Marc Anthony on vocals.

In 2013, Hanlon released "I'll Be There (Alli Estare)," a bilingual cover of the Jackson Five classic with Karlos Rose on vocals. The track spent 16 weeks on the Top 10 of Billboard's Tropical Airplay chart.

== Discography ==
=== Studio albums ===
Year	Album	Label
1999	Encuentros	Max Music & Entertainment
2001	El Piano Amarillo	Fonovisa
2004	11 Números Uno	Fonovisa
2005	La Gorda Linda	Fonovisa
2006	Mecanomanía	EMI Records
2012	Encanto Del Caribe Arthur Hanlon & Friends (Live From San Cristobal Castle, Puerto Rico/2011)	Universal Latin
2016	Viajero	Sony Music Latin
2020	Piano y Mujer	Sony Music Latin
2022	Piano y Mujer II	Sony Music Latin
2022	A Magical Christmas Piano	Sony Music Latin
2023	Legados Bachata	Sony Music Latin
2023	Legados Pop	Sony Music Latin
2025	2 MANOS 1 MUNDO	Sony Music Latin

=== Singles ===
==== 2000s ====
Year	Singles
2008	"Esta Navidad" (with Janina)
2008	"Carol of the Bells"
2009	"Que Tu Piano Hable Por Ti" (with Myriam Hernandez)

==== 2010s ====
Year	Singles
2010	"Navidad Navidad"
2010	"Piano Sin Fronteras"
2012	"Historia De Un Amor" (with Natalia Jiménez)
2013	"I'll Be There" (featuring Karlos Rose)
2017	"No Tuve La Culpa" (with ChocQuibTown)
2017	"Aura" (Ozuna featuring Arthur Hanlon)
2018	"Si Tu Te Vas" (with Fonseca)
2019	"Balada Para Adelina"
2019	"Como Suena El Piano" (with Orishas)
2019	"Noche de Paz" (with Yuri and Carlos Rivera)

==== 2020s ====
Year	Singles
2020	"Como Suena El Piano" (Remix) (with Orishas and Lunay)
2021	"Evidencias" (with Kany Garcia)
2021	"Cielo Rojo" (with Natalia Jiménez)
2021	"Nuquí (Te Quiero Para Mí) (with Goyo)
2021	"Hallelujah" (with Evaluna Montaner)
2022	"Los Amantes" (with Mocedades)
2022	"Unforgettable" (with Evaluna Montaener)
2022	"Lo Aprendi de Ti" (with Ha*ash)
2022	"Nuestra Cancion" (with Catalina Garcia)
2022	"Quizas, Quizas, Quizas" (with Debi Nova)
2022	"Without You" (with Lupita Infante)
2022	"Ya Te Olvide" (with Ivy Queen)
2023	"Darte un Beso" (with Peter Nieto)
2023	"Todo Cambio" (with Mariangela)
2024	"Repetimos" (with Yotuel and Darell)
2024	"Egoista" (with Ana Barbara)
2025	"El mambo Llana" (with Guaynaa)

=== Specials ===
Year	Special	Label
2012	Encanto Del Caribe: Arthur Hanlon & Friends	Universal Latin
2020	Piano y Mujer	Sony Music Latin
2022	Piano y Mujer II	Sony Music Latin
