= Generation Next (album) =

Studio album by Aventura
- Released: November 9, 1999
- Recorded: 1999
- Genre: Bachata; pop; R&B; hip-hop; urban; merengue
- Length: 45:09
- Label: Premium Latin Music

Aventura chronology
Trampa de Amor (1996)	Generation Next (1999)	We Broke The Rules (2002)

Singles from Generation Next
- 1. "Cuando Volverás" Released: 1999

Professional ratings
Review scores
Source	Rating
AllMusic	3.5/5 stars

Generation Next is an album by bachata group Aventura, released in 1999 through Premium Latin Music. It is their first album under the name Aventura, after their 1996 debut album when they were called Los Tinellers. Generation Next marked the start of a new generation in the genre of bachata, as the group mixed bachata with other genres like hip hop and R&B. This album included six songs from Trampa de Amor, their original first album during their time as Los Tinellers. These six songs were modernized for Generation Next. This included the lead single, "Cuando Volverás". The album peaked at number 19 on the Billboard Tropical Albums chart. A vinyl was released on August 14, 2020, to celebrate the 20th anniversary of the album.

== Background ==
The group was formed in 1994 as Los Tinellers. In 1995, they were managed by Elvin Polanco. With Polanco's help, they released their original first album Trampa de Amor. Unfortunately, due to lack of advertisement and funds, the album barely sold copies. It is said that they only sold a total of five copies. A few years later, their new manager, Julio César García re-branded them as Aventura and landed them a record deal with Premium Latin Music. With a record label backing them up, the group would now have a budget to make music and do more, thus eventually re-inventing their style and recreating six of their songs from their previous album in addition to making new songs. This would be the developing stages of mixing American genres with bachata.

== Singles ==
The main single for this album was "Cuando Volverás". The song was made back in 1995 for Trampa de Amor. A few years later, a remake was made as part of the group's objective to modernize bachata. The remake was released in 1999, and it became the debut single as well. The single became successful in the Dominican Republic and the east coast of the United States. Later on, it became known worldwide after the group's mainstream expansion. It even peaked at number 6 in Italy. It is one of their signature songs.

== 20th anniversary vinyl ==
A vinyl was released on August 14, 2020, to celebrate the 20th anniversary of the album. Because of this, the album would finally make it on the Billboard charts as prior to the vinyl's release, it had never charted on any of those charts. It first peaked at number 20 in 2020 on the Tropical Albums chart. In 2022, the album peaked at number 19.

== Track listing ==
All tracks are written by Anthony "Romeo" Santos.

No.	Title	Translation	Length
1.	"Cuándo Volverás"	"When Will You Come Back"	3:30
2.	"Alexandra"		4:05
3.	"Mujeriego"	Womanizer	3:26
4.	"La Novelita"	"The Little Soap Opera"	4:04
5.	"Amor Bonito (Novela 2)"	"Beautiful Love (The Soap Opera)"	3:37
6.	"No Lo Perdona Dios"	"God Won't Forgive It"	4:32
7.	"El Coro Dominicano"	"The Dominican Chorus"	4:23
8.	"Dime Si Te Gusto"	"Tell Me If You Like Me"	4:27
9.	"Un Poeta Enamorado"	"A Poet in Love"	4:14
10.	"Si Me Dejas, Muero"	"If You Leave Me, I'll Die"	4:44
Total length:			41:38

Bonus Track
No.	Title	Translation	Length
11.	"Cuándo Volverás" (English Version)	"When Will You Come Back" (English Version)	3:30
Total length:			45:08

- The English version of "Cuando Volveras" is actually more of a bilingual (English & Spanish) version of the song. It is sometimes referred to as a Spanglish version.

== Charts and sales ==
Chart (2004)	Peak Position
Swiss Albums (Schweizer Hitparade)	74
Chart (2022)	Peak Position
US Tropical Albums (Billboard)	19

=== Sales ===
Region	Certification	Certified units/sales
United States	—	13,000
