= Max Santos =

American musician

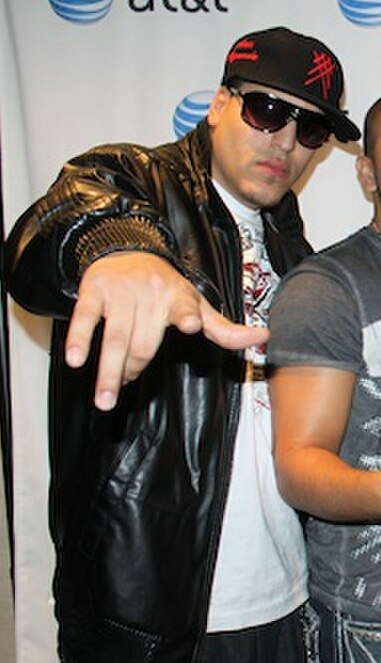

Background information
- Also known as: Max Agende; Mikey El Trueno
- Born: Max Santos; January 30, 1982 (age 44), The Bronx, New York, U.S.
- Genres: Bachata; hip hop; Latin hip hop; rock
- Occupation: Musician
- Instruments: Bass guitar, vocals
- Years active: 1994–present
- Labels: Premium Latin; Max Musick
- Member of: Aventura

Max "Mikey" Santos (born January 30, 1982), known professionally as Max Agende, is an American bass guitarist, musical arranger and rapper. He rose to global fame as the co-founder of the bachata group Aventura. Max is considered a bass guitar legend in the bachata world and is responsible for the modernization of bachata bass playing. He brought bass techniques from rock songs he would play as a kid.

== Early life ==
Santos was born in 1982 in The Bronx, New York City, to Dominican parents. He grew up in the South Bronx neighborhood in the Bronx. He has six brothers. He began playing bass at age 12, after borrowing an instrument at school. He and his brother Lenny often experimented together at home in duo, bass, and guitar. Max loves rock music and brought a touch of this genre to Aventura's sound.

== Career ==
Max is the creator and owner of his record label Max Musick. He has signed many underground Latin urban artists to this label. Max has worked for many Latin artists. Max credits as bass player include Elvis Martinez, Henry Santos, Toby Love, Optimo, Thalia, among others. Max appeared on Romeo's latest album, Utopia (2019), recording Inmortal by Aventura.

=== Aventura ===
Max, alongside his brother Lenny and his friends Anthony "Romeo" and Henry formed the group Los Tinellers in 1995, releasing a studio album which did not do well. They then became Aventura in 1999. Max was the bass player, rapper and musical arranger for Aventura. Aventura released their debut album in 1999 breaking the rules of bachata music. He added fusions of rock and Hip Hop. He modernized the way Bachata bass was played. He was the first Bachata bass player to incorporate melodies, slides, bass slapping, among other techniques into Aventura's sound. He is featured as a rapper on the We Broke The Rules track "Obsesion (English Remix)", the album Love & Hate on a track entitled "Don’t Waste My Time" and with Nina Sky on the God's Project track "You're Lying".

=== Max Agende ===
He has been working on his Rap career professionally since 2007. He has co-signed Latin urban artists such as Mozart La Para, El Soprano and Milka La Mas Dura. He has released music in both the underground and mainstream market. He has also released Rap influenced Bachata songs such as Loco de Amor (2017) which he produced alongside his brother Lenny.

=== Vena and DNA Latin Group ===
He and his brother Lenny formed a bachata group called D'Element. As D'Element, they have released one song called "You & Me". After producing a song for Steve Styles from the Bachata group Xtreme, he asked if he would like to join his new group. Steve accepted the offer and they formed Vena. They released their first two singles "Señora" and "Ya No" in 2012 which became instant hits. Since then they have released countless top charting songs, such as "Corazón De Hierro" (feat. Teodoro Reyes and Frank Reyes, "Dile A El", "Por Mentiras" among others. Steve left the group in 2015, after having problems with the manager. Max left the group to pursue to focus on his rap career. Lenny released "El Final" featuring Mike Stanley, which was composed by Steve. Lenny had the rights to the song already, even though Steve released his own version of the song. In 2018, Lenny, alongside new singer J Love, released "Lujuria" under the group's new name DNA Latin Group, or DNA for short. They released their second single "Hermanita". Max then rejoined the group and they released their third single "Soy Tu Delirio." Since then they have been working on new music, which is planned to be released in 2019.
