= Ya No (Vena song) =

Single by Vena
- Released: February 5, 2012
- Recorded: 2011
- Genre: Bachata
- Length: 4:35
- Label: Planet Records; Element Music Group

Vena singles chronology
"Party Rock Anthem" (2011)	"Ya No" (2012)	"Por Mentiras" (2012)

Music video
- "Ya No" on YouTube

"Ya No" (English: "No More") is a song by Dominican-American bachata trio Vena. It was released on February 5, 2012, by Planet Records and Len Melody's Element Music Group. The music video was on May 17, 2012, and it was filmed in Dominican Republic. As of June 2023, it has over 5.4 million views on YouTube. They performed this song live on an episode of the Spanish-language television show Sábado Gigante.

== Charts ==
Chart (2012)	Peak Position
US Tropical Airplay (Billboard)	10
