= Pavel Núñez =

Pavel Núñez commonly referred to as Pavel is a Dominican Republic singer from Santo Domingo, with influences of Rock en Español, Latin pop, and Dominican traditional music. Best known for his international hit single "Te Di", and other favorites like "Betania" and "Paso a Paso". He released his album "El Tiempo del Viento" in early 2010.
