= 2.0 (Henry Santos album) =

Studio album by Henry Santos
- Released: May 31, 2024; October 11, 2024 (2.5)
- Genre: Bachata
- Length: 43:32; 53:28 (2.5)
- Label: Hustle Hard Entertainment

Henry Santos chronology
Friends & Legends (2018)	2.0 (2024)	After The Noise: Lado A (2026)

Singles from 2.0
- 1. "Te Di" Released: 2022; 2. "Cuando Te Toco" Released: 2022; 3. "Me Dejó" Released: 2023; 4. "Nesesitaba Decirlo" Released: 2023; 5. "La Excepción" Released: 2023; 6. "No Soy Nada Sin Ti" Released: 2023; 7. "Dominicano" Released: 2024; 8. "Brindo Con Agua" Released: 2024

2.0 is the sixth studio album by Dominican singer Henry Santos. It is the sequel to his 2021 album, Friends & Legends. It was released by his own record label, HustleHard Entertainment on May 31, 2024. On October 11, 2024, he released an extended version titled 2.5.

== Singles ==
This album was supported by 8 Singles. One of them is the song Brindo Con Agua. This single is an Aventura song as Santos reunited with the other members in 2024 for a tour in which they released this song in the process.

== Track listing ==
2.0
No.	Title	Length
1.	"Cuando Te Toco" (featuring JFab & Paola Fabre)	3:06
2.	"Necesitaba Decirlo"	3:26
3.	"Brindo Con Agua" (Aventura)	4:41
4.	"La Excepción"	3:49
5.	"No Soy Nada Sin Ti" (featuring Frank Reyes)	3:59
6.	"Quíteme La Inocencia"	4:10
7.	"Vete" (featuring Ephrem J)	3:42
8.	"Me Dejó"	3:32
9.	"Dominicano" (featuring Urbanda)	3:48
10.	"Te Di" (featuring Pavel Núñez)	4:23
11.	"La Excepción" (featuring Kiko Rodriguez)	3:52
Total length:		43:32

2.5
No.	Title	Length
1.	"No Te Encuentro" (featuring Alexandra The Queen)	3:33
2.	"Necesitaba Decirlo"	3:26
3.	"Brindo Con Agua" (Aventura)	4:41
4.	"La Excepción"	3:49
5.	"No Soy Nada Sin Ti" (featuring Frank Reyes)	3:59
6.	"Quíteme La Inocencia"	4:10
7.	"Vete" (featuring Ephrem J)	3:42
8.	"Me Dejó"	3:32
9.	"Dominicano" (featuring Urbanda)	3:48
10.	"Cuando Te Toco" (featuring JFab & Paola Fabre)	3:06
11.	"Te Di" (featuring Pavel Núñez)	4:23
12.	"Parece Un Mal Sueño"	3:56
13.	"o Sé, Primo Mío"	2:26
14.	"La Excepción" (featuring Kiko Rodriguez)	3:52
Total length:		53:28
