= Quédate (Henry Santos song) =

2016 single by Henry Santos

Single by Henry Santos

from the album The Third
- Released: February 19, 2016
- Recorded: 2015
- Genre: Bachata
- Length: 4:01
- Label: Hustle Hard Entertainment

Henry Santos singles chronology
"Y Eres Tan Bella" (2015)	"Quédate" (2016)	"Cuídame" (2016)

Music video
- "Quédate" on YouTube

"Quédate" (Stay) is a song by Dominican singer Henry Santos . It was released on February 19, 2016, and served as the second single for his third album The Third (2016). The music video was released on June 30, 2016.

== Charts ==
Chart performance for "Quédate"
Chart (2016)	Peak position
US Tropical Airplay (Billboard)	22
