= Karlos Rosé =

- Born: Carlos De La Rosa; May 27, 1995 (age 29); Dominican Republic
- Occupations: Singer; songwriter; record producer; musician
- Years active: 2012–present
- Musical career
- Genres: Bachata; Pop; R&B; Tropical
- Labels: Machete Music; UMG; Joch Entertainment; WK Records; 212 Music Management

Carlos De La Rosa better known by his stage name Karlos Rosé is a Dominican Bachata music artist. He began his career as a singer on the Dominican television program Divertido con Jochy when he was seventeen years old. In 2012, he released his debut single "Just the Way You Are", a bachata cover of Bruno Mars's song which reached number one on the Billboard Tropical Songs. In 2013, his second single "Infiel", which was originally performed by Colombian music group Daniel Calderon y Los Gigantes, also reached number one on the Tropical Songs chart. In the same year, he collaborated with American pianist Arthur Hanlon to perform a cover of The Jackson 5's song "I'll Be There. It reached number four on the Tropical Songs chart.

== Discography ==
- Géminis (2015)
1. Ojos Verdes - 3:41
2. Mentías - 4:04
3. Mi Lugar Es Contigo (Bachata Version) - 3:36
4. El Único Que Te Ha Amado - 3:58
5. Por Ti - 4:20
6. Que No Salga El Sol - 3:47
7. Princesita - 3:36
8. Enseñame A Olvidar - 3:52
9. Niña De Mi Corazón - 3:05
10. Por Amarte - 3:53
11. Infiel - 4:25
12. Just The Way You Are - 3:40
13. Ojos Verdes (Accordion Version) - 3:41
14. Mi Lugar Es Contigo (Pop Version) - 3:33
- Sabotaje (2019)
1. Sabotaje - 3:29
2. Te Salvaré - 3:17
3. Siento Que Muero - 3:50
4. La Ronda - 3:32
5. El Juego - 3:34
6. Mi Cama Es Testigo - 3:25
7. Brindo - 3:29
8. Ya Te Olvide - 3:37
9. No Dejo De Amarte - 4:10

=== Singles ===
As lead artist

Year	Single	Chart Positions				Album
Year	Single	U.S. Latin Songs	U.S. Latin Airplay	U.S. Latin Pop	U.S. Latin Tropical	Album
2012	"Just the Way You Are"	31	31	—	1	Géminis
2013	"Infiel"	29	39	—	1	Géminis
2013	"Por Ti"	—	—	—	3	Géminis
2014	"Niña De Mi Corazón"	26	22	—	1	Géminis
2015	"Mi Lugar Es Contigo"	—	34	7	1	Géminis
2016	"No Dejo De Amarte"	—	—	21	9	Sabotaje
2020	"Tan Facil"	—	—	—	16	Non-album single
2021	"El Espejo"	—	—	—	—	Non-album single
2022	"La Verdad"	—	—	—	—	Non-album single
2022	"Un Mal Sueño"	—	—	—	—	Non-album single
2022	"Yo No Me Muero Por Nadie"	—	—	—	—	Non-album single
2023	"A Gritos De Esperanza"	—	—	—	—	Non-album single
2023	"Desde Cero" (with Luchy DR)	—	—	—	—	Non-album single

Featured

Year	Single	Chart Positions				Album
Year	Single	U.S. Latin Songs	U.S. Latin Airplay	U.S. Latin Pop	U.S. Latin Tropical	Album
2013	"I'll Be There" (Allí Estaré) (with Arthur Hanlon)	41	29	37	4	Non-album single
2016	"Valiente" (Bachata Version) (with Paty Cantú)	—	—	—	—	Non-album single
2021	"Dos Caras" (with Classay)	—	—	—	—	Non-album single
