= Maffio =

Dominican musical artist (born 1986)

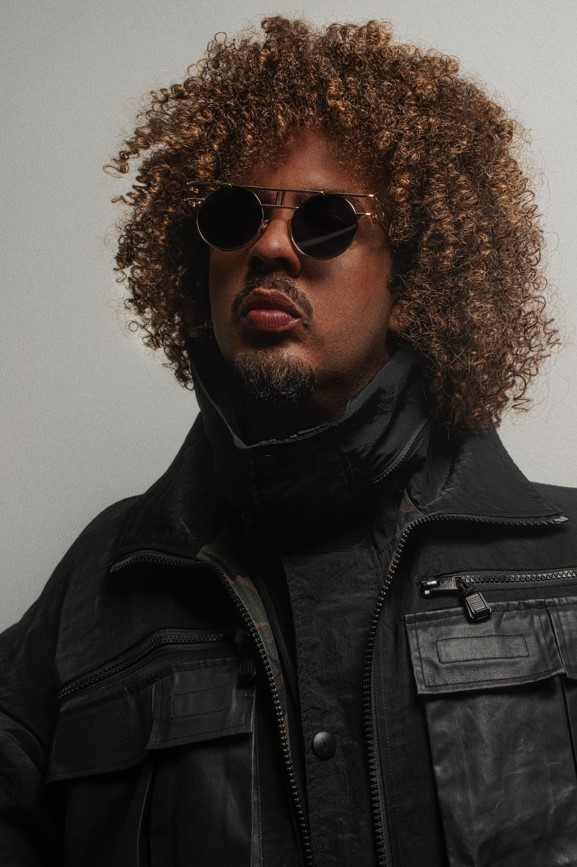

Background information
- Also known as: Maffio
- Born: Carlos Ariel Peralta Mendoza; 24 January 1986 (age 39); Santo Domingo, Dominican Republic
- Genres: Urban music
- Occupation(s): Composer and producer

Carlos Ariel Peralta Mendoza, known by his stage name Maffio (born 1986), is a Dominican producer, composer, songwriter and artist.

== Biography ==
Mendoza was born in 1986 in Santo Domingo, Dominican Republic.

His musical endeavors began at the age of six when he began teaching himself to play the piano. At age 9, he started composing songs and at 12, he started producing. The name "Maffio" comes from his father, who nicknamed him that after noticing that even as a child, Carlos had a fondness for mafia documentaries. His musical influences include Bob Marley, Donna Summer, Bee Gees, Camilo Sesto, Michael Jackson and Chuck Mangione.

Maffio is involved in charity work at St. Jude Children's Research Hospital and formerly at Miami Children's Hospital.

== Musical career ==
At age 20, Maffio achieved his first major brake though producing "Mi alma se muere" for Fuego, Pitbull, and Omega. His recording and producing studio is called "ReHab" and has been operating in Miami for five years. In 2015, Mayor Tomás Regalado honored Maffio with the keys to the city of Miami. He was an independent artist until 2019; he is currently signed to Sony Music Entertainment.

Maffio has collaborated with artists such as Farruko, Nacho, Nicky Jam, Bryant Myers, Chino & Nacho, Fonseca, Gente de Zona, Juan Magán, Fuego, Akon, Soleil, Olga Tañón and Elvis Crespo. His song "Tú Me Quemas" appears in the movie Ride Along 2. He also produced Akon's album El Negreeto, with Anitta, Ozuna, Anuel AA, Nacho, Farruko and Becky G.

== Discography ==
=== Solo albums ===
- TumbaGobierno (2020)
- Eso Es Mental (2022)

=== Singles ===
Year	Title	Type
2012	Si Yo Fuera Él (with Joey Montana)	Single
2012	No Te Dejaré De Amar	Single
2013	No Tengo Dinero	Single
2014	Quiero Otro Amor	Single
2017	Besame (with Carlos PenaVega)	Single
2019	Cristina (fwith Nacho, J Quiles y Shelow Shaq)	Single
2020	Mente a Na' (with Tito El Bambino, Nacho, Kiko El Crazy, Químico Ultra Mega)	Single
2020	Carne (with Don Miguelo)	Single
2021	Solo (with Ana Mena, Omar Montes)	Single
2022	Dale Pa'Ya (with Big Time Rush)	Single
2022	Dale Pa'Ya (with Big Time Rush and Gente De Zona)	Single
2022	Ocean World (with Big Time Rush)	Single
2022	Me gusta Me gusta (with Paulina Rubio)	Single
2022	Hablame De Miami (with Gente De Zona)	Single
2023	Yo Las Pongo (with Deorro, Los Tucanes de Tijuana)	Single
2023	Yo No Se (Anitta, L7nnon)	Single

=== Producer ===
Year	Artist	Song
2009	Omega, Fuego	"Súper Estrella"
2010	Fuego	"Que buena tu ta" feat. Divani
2011	Fonseca	"Eres mi sueño"
2012	Gente De Zona	"Ropa Puesta"
2015	Chino & Nacho	"Tú me quemas"
2015	Fuego	"Mambo Para Bailar"
2015	Farruko	"Chillax"
2015	Jencarlos Canela	"Bajito"
2016	Jencarlos Canela	"Pa Que Me Invitan"
2016	Jencarlos Canela	"Baby"
2017	Nicky Jam	"Without You"
2018	Bryant Myers	"Ponle Música" feat. Plan B
2018	Kalash	"Bad Like Me" feat Admiral T.
2018	Kalash	"I Will Be There"
2019	Lo Blanquito	"Me Botó"
2019	Natti Natasha	"No Voy A Llorar"
2019	Maffio, Nacho, J Quiles	"Cristina" feat. Shelow Shaq
2019	Akon	"Te Quiero Amar" feat Pitbull
2019	Akon	"Bailame Lento"
2019	Akon	"Como No" feat Becky G
2019	Akon	"Boom Boom" feat Anitta
2019	Akon	"Dile"
2019	Akon	"Innocente"
2019	Nacho	"Mambo A Los Haters" feat Fuego
2019	Akon	"Solo Tu" feat Farruko
2019	Felon	La Range feat. Maffio
2019	Akon	"Baila Conmigo"
2020	Maffio, Nacho, Tito El Bambino	"Mente a Na'" feat. Kiko El Crazy, Químico Ultra Mega
2020	Darkiel	"Me Siento Bien" feat. Shaggy, Maffio
2020	Maffio	"Carne" feat. Don Miguelo
2020	Daddy Yankee, El Alfa, and Justin Quiles	"PAM"
2021	Gente De Zona, Maffio	"Hablame de Miami”
2023	Farruko, Yung Wylin', Maffio	"Good Energy (Remix)"

=== Other projects ===
Year	Type	Title
2013	Feature	"Tentandome," Juan Magán
2016	Writer	"Si No Te Quisiera," Juan Magán feat. Belinda and Lápiz Conciente.
2016	Writer	"Vuelve", Juan Magán feat. Paulina Rubio.
2017	Writer	"Without You," Nicky Jam.
2019	Writer	"Cristina," Maffio, Nacho, J Quiles feat. Shelow Shaq

== Acknowledgments ==
- Double Platinum, Jencarlos Canela, "Bajito", Central America as writer
- Double Platinum, Gente de Zona, "Visualízate", United States as producer
- 11× Diamond, Nicky Jam, "Fénix", United States
- Platinum, Jencarlos Canela, "Baby", Central America
- Diamond, Jencarlos Canela, "Bajito", Central America
- Gold, Juan Magán feat. Belinda and Lápiz Conciente, "Si No Te Quisiera", United States
- Double Platinum, Juan Magán feat. Maffio, "Tentándome", Spain
- Triple Platinum, Juan Magán feat. Paulina Rubio, "Vuelve", Spain
- 6× Platinum, Farruko, "Chillax", United States as producer
- No. 1 Billboard, Chino & Nacho, "Tú me quemas", United States as writer
- Gold, Kalash, "Kaos", France,
- Winner of 20 ASCAP Awards
