= Planet Records Europe =

Italian independent record label

Planet Records
- Founded: 1998
- Founder: Roberto Ferrante
- Headquarters: Naples, Italy
- Products: Music, videos, entertainment, magazines
- Website: www.planetrecords.it

Planet Records is an Italian independent label founded in 1998 by producer Roberto Ferrante. It has had twelve records certified platinum in Europe, four gold and two silver. Its records have sold several million copies.

== Group ==
Planet Records is part of an International recording and publishing group with operations in cities including Miami, New York, Naples, Milan, Paris, Havana and Santo Domingo. The company distributes both physical and digital music releases through an international distribution network. The group is managed from its European headquarters. Its US operations have included personnel involved in promotion, television marketing, and sales management. The group also operates under the brands Planet Records America and Planet Records Europe, and includes several music publishing companies as well as Planet Recordings Studio, which is used for the company's in-house productions. Since 2004, Planet has also been involved in magazine publishing, including Latino!, a bimonthly music magazine distributed in Italy.

== History ==
Roberto Ferrante, a producer and remixer who had worked at Flying Records before its closure, created Planet Records.

In 2003 the company released Noelia's "Enamorada", followed by Aventura's "Obsesión"

Planet Records created a music magazine with a CD included which has called it Latino! which almost 1,250,000 copies sold in 8 years). At the end of 2004 Planet Records promoted a new Dominican artist, Papi Sánchez releasing the CD "Yeah Baby" and the single "Enamórame", which sold about 1,000,000 copies in Europe. In 2005/2006 Planet continues the collection of chart hits with the reconfirmation of Aventura among the 20 top sellers of the year with the album Love & Hate and God's Project, followed by the singles "Nore", "Oye Mi Canto", Bascom X's "Lonely Girl", the new CD of the reunion of the Tears for Fears Everybody Loves a Happy Ending and the return of former Spice Girl Melanie C with the album Beautiful Intention. In 2005 Planet Records had artists present at the Festivalbar. In 2006 it released the first Italian product from Piper whose single CD was Ciao Ciao.

Planet Records released and promoted the new solo album This Time by the former Spice Girl Melanie C and promoted the Aventura's new album KOB and in April 2008 a new album by Hanson.

Planet Records opened an office at Miami, Florida and became Planet Records US LLC.

Omega, El Cata, Gente De Zona, Alex Matos, Prince Royce, Luis Enrique, Fito Blanko were promoted by Planet Records.

== Artists ==
- Prince Royce
- Toby Love
- Divan
- Gente de Zona
- Omega
- Jacob Forever
- Nicky Jam
- Osmani Garcia
- Don Omar
- Baby Lores
- Los 4
- Los Van Van
- Charanga Habanera
- Issac Delgado
- Maykel Blanco
- Manolito Simonet y su Trabuco
- Laritza Bacallao
- Fito Blanko
- Fuego
- Huey Dunbar
- Andy Andy
- Tito Nieves
- Tito Swing
- Ilegales
- Papi Sánchez
- Luis Enrique
- Raulín Rodríguez
- Chiquito Team Band
- El Cata
- Leslie Grace
- Alex Matos
- Solo 2
- Marvin Freddy
- Tapo & Raya
- Amara La Negra
- Yiyo Sarante
- DJ Mams
- Carolina Marconi
- Los Principales
- Rumai
- Paolo Belli
- Loretta Grace
- Vena
- Honorebel
- Moya
- Nicola Di Bardi
- Tears for Fears
- Agnes
- Melane C
- Hound Dogs
- The Ark
- Sr Oliver Skardy

== International artists ==
- Tears For Fears
- Melanie C
- Agnes
- The Ark
- Hanson
