= Lenny Santos =

American musician

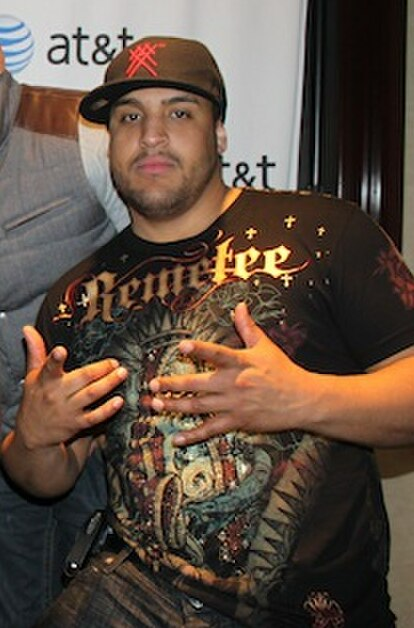
- Santos in 2009

Background information
- Also known as: Len Melody; Playboy
- Born: October 24, 1979 (age 46); Bronx, New York, U.S.
- Genres: Bachata; R&B; hip hop; reggaeton; merengue
- Instrument: Guitar
- Years active: 1994–present
- Labels: Premiun Latin; Sony Latin; Element
- Member of: Aventura

Lenny Santos a.k.a. Len Melody (born October 24, 1979) is an American guitarist, composer, producer and entrepreneur. He rose to global fame as the co-founder of the bachata group Aventura where he served as producer, lead guitarist, vocalist, composer and musical director. Lenny is responsible for the group's distinctive sound. He is the one who dared to experiment with bachata, adding fusions of R&B, hip hop and pop. He added electric guitars and effects like tremolo, phaser and wah. Lenny is considered the pioneer and creator of urban bachata, and is one of the most sought out music producers in the Latin music industry. Aside from being a musician and producer, he owns restaurants and lounges in New York City.

== Early life ==
Santos was born in 1979 in The Bronx, New York City, to Dominican parents. He grew up in the South Bronx neighborhood in the Bronx. He has six brothers. He initially wanted to play bass after seeing his brother Max play bass, but he chose guitar instead. His inspiration to play guitar was Antony Santos, saying that he copied him exactly and then added more stuff.

== Career ==
Lenny has worked for many Latin artists. Some of Lenny's credits as producer, guitarist and composer include Prince Royce, Romeo Santos, Henry Santos, Natti Natasha, Toby Love, Camila, Chayanne, Thalia, Frank Reyes, Optimo, Andy Andy, Carlos & Alejandra, Ivy Queen, Elvis Martinez, De la Ghetto, Elvis Crespo, Karlos Rosé, Khea, Alam A, among others. In 2020, he collaborated with the Argentine rapper Khea on the song "Ayer Me Llamó Mi Ex". In 2021, he worked with Karol G on her latest single "El Barco". He performed the song live with Karol on The Tonight Show Starring Jimmy Fallon alongside Chi Requinto, lead guitarist of Romeo Santos band.

=== Aventura ===
Lenny, alongside his brother Max and his friends Anthony and Henry formed the group Los Tinellers in 1995, releasing a studio album which did not do well. They then became Aventura in 1999. Lenny was the lead guitarist, producer, musical arranger, musical director and backup singer. Aventura released their debut album in 1999 breaking the rules of bachata music. He added fusions of R&B and Hip Hop. He added electric guitars and added guitar effects such as tremolo, distortion, harmonizer, flanger, phaser and wah which were never used or heard of in bachata. In 2002, the song, "Obsesión" achieved huge success in many countries, topping many international charts like France, Germany and Italy. Aventura's sound broke into the mainstream thanks to Lenny and the group helped bring bachata to international popularity. He produced Ella y Yo (feat. Don Omar) fusing reggaeton with bachata and merengue elements. This sound was then sought out by reggaeton producers everywhere, making him one of the pioneers of adding bachata elements into reggaeton. Lenny produced every single Aventura album, with Romeo co-producing the last three albums.

=== Elvis Martinez ===
Lenny produced, recorded and arranged Elvis Martinez debut album Todo Se Paga (1998) as well as his sophomore album Directo Al Corazon (1999) alongside his brother Max. He did this while working on Aventura's debut album. Lenny created most of the musical arrangements and recorded the guitar tracks. Max recorded the bass tracks. Lenny even showed Elvis how to play guitar.

=== Vena and DNA Latin Group ===
He and his brother Max formed a bachata group called D'Element. As D'Element, they have released one song called "You & Me". After producing a song for Steve Styles from the Bachata group Xtreme, he asked if he would like to join his new group. Steve accepted the offer and they formed the bachata super group VENA. They released their first two singles "Señora" and "Ya No" in 2012 which became instant hits. Since then they have released countless top charting songs, such as "Corazon de Hierro (feat. Teodoro Reyes and Frank Reyes)", "Dile a El", "Por Mentiras" among others. Steve left the group in 2015, after having problems with management. Max left the group to pursue and focus on his rap career, which he was supposed to do back when Aventura broke up. Lenny released "El Final" featuring Mike Stanley, which was written by Steve. Lenny had the rights to the song already, even though Steve released his own version of the song. In 2018, Lenny, alongside new singer J Love, released "Lujuria" under the group's new name DNA Latin Group, or DNA for short. They released their second single "Hermanita". Max then re joined the group and they released their third single "Soy Tu Delirio." Since then they have been working on new music, which is planned to be released in 2019.

== Discography ==
=== Studio albums ===
- Lenny Santos... Aventurero (2012)
