= Aventura discography =

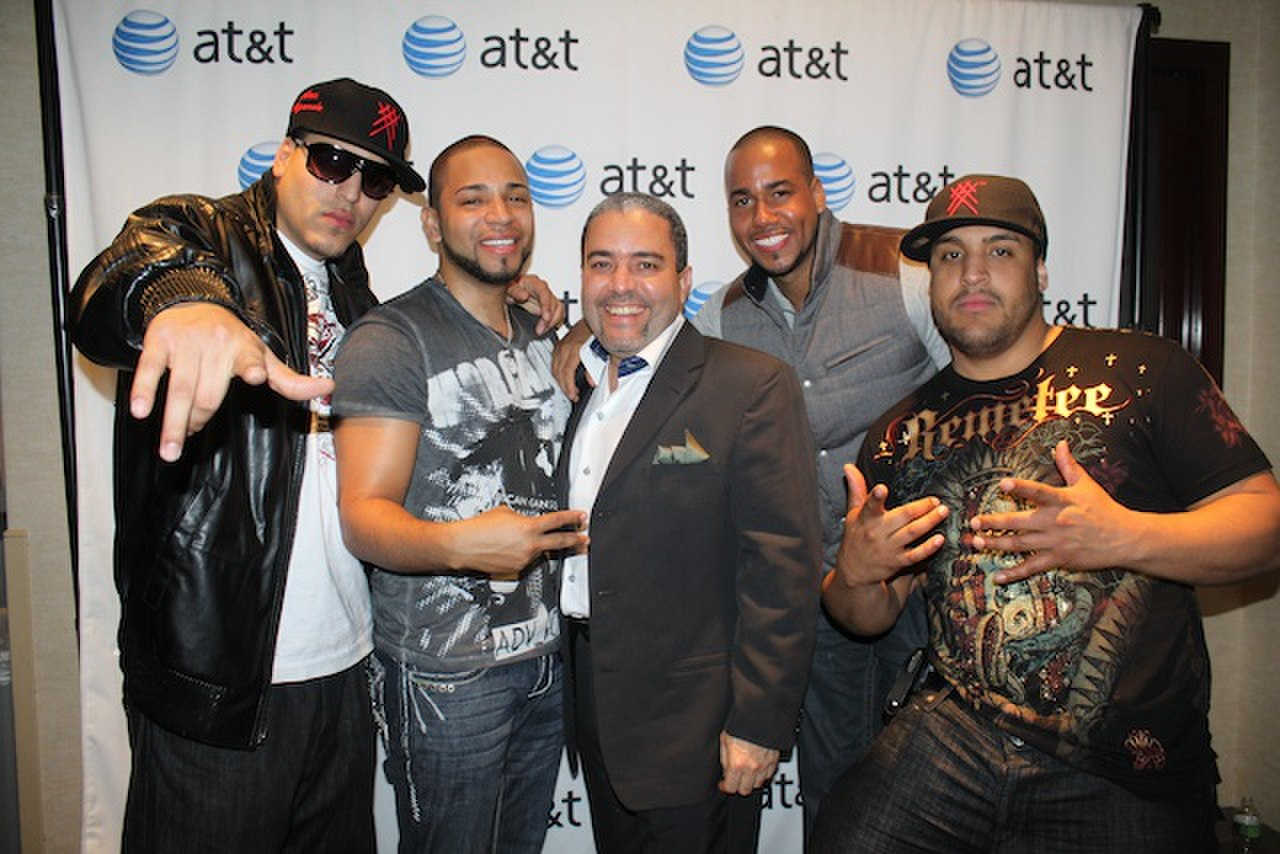
- Studio albums: 6
- Live albums: 3
- Singles: 27
- Video albums: 3
- Music videos: 15

American bachata band Aventura has released six studio albums, three live albums, two video albums, 15 music videos and 27 singles.

== Albums ==
=== Studio albums ===
As Los Tinellers

Album	Details
Trampa de Amor	Released: 1996, Label: Elca Productions, Rincón Musical; Format: CD, digital download

As Aventura

Title	Details	Peak chart positions					Sales	Certifications
Title	Details	US	US Latin	US Trop.	SWI	MEX	Sales	Certifications
Generation Next	Released: November 9, 1999; Label: Premium Latin; Formats: CD, digital download	—	—	19	74	—	US: 13,000	
We Broke the Rules	Released: July 2, 2002; Label: Premium Latin; Formats: CD, digital download	—	56	5	4	—	World: 1,500,000	IFPI SWI: Platinum
Love & Hate	Released: November 18, 2003; Label: Premium Latin; Formats: CD, digital download	—	66	4	3	—	US: 48,000	IFPI SWI: Platinum; RIAA: Platinum (Latin)
God's Project	Released: April 26, 2005; Label: Premium Latin, Sony; Formats: CD, digital download	133	5	1	2	—	US: 316,000; World: 500,000	IFPI SWI: Gold; RIAA: 4× Platinum (Latin)
The Last	Released: June 9, 2009; Label: Premium Latin, Sony; Formats: CD, digital download	5	1	1	10	16	World: 500,000; US: 396,000	RIAA: 4× Platinum (Latin); AMPROFON: Platinum

=== Live albums ===
Title	Details	Peak chart positions					Certifications
Title	Details	US	US Latin	US Trop.	SWI	ITA	Certifications
Unplugged	Released: August 30, 2004; Record Label: Walbo; Formats: CD, digital download	—	—	—	55	—	
K.O.B. Live	Released: December 19, 2006; Label: Premium Latin, Sony; Formats: CD, digital download	124	2	1	25	75	RIAA: 6× Platinum (Latin)
Kings of Bachata: Sold Out at Madison Square Garden	Released: November 13, 2007; Label: Premium Latin, Sony; Formats: CD, digital download	97	3	1	—	—	RIAA: 8× Platinum (Latin)
Live from the World	Released: 2008; Label: Premium Latin, Sony; Formats: CD, digital download	—	—	—	—	—	

=== Compilation albums ===
Title	Details	Peak chart positions				Certifications
Title	Details	US	US Sales	US Latin	US Trop.	Certifications
14 + 14	Released: May 24, 2011; Record Label: Premium Latin; Formats: CD, digital download	132	115	1	1	
Sólo Para Mujeres	Released: November 4, 2014; Label: Premium Latin, Sony; Formats: CD, digital download	—	—	15	3	
Todavía Me Amas: Lo Mejor De Aventura	Released: February 5, 2016; Label: The Orchard, Sony; Formats: CD, digital download	156	—	5	1	RIAA: 3× Platinum (Latin)

== Singles ==
=== As lead artist ===
Single	Year	Chart positions									Certifications	Album
Single	Year	US	US Latin	US Latin Pop	US Trop.	DR Gen.	PR Gen.	SPA	ITA	SWI	Certifications	Album
"Cuando Volverás"	1999	—	—	—	—	—	—	—	6	52		Generation Next
"Obsesión" (featuring Judy Santos)	2002	—	—	—	32	—	—	4	1	1	IFPI: Gold; BEA: Platinum; SNEP: Diamond; FIMI: Platinum	We Broke the Rules
"Todavía Me Amas"	2002	—	—	—	—	—	—	—	—	—		We Broke the Rules
"Amor De Madre"	2002	—	—	—	—	—	—	—	—	—		We Broke the Rules
"Enséñame A Olvidar"	2002	—	—	—	—	—	—	—	—	—		We Broke the Rules
"Hermanita"	2003	—	33	—	3	—	—	—	25	—		Love & Hate
"Llorar"	2004	—	—	—	8	—	—	—	—	—		Love & Hate
"La Guerra" (featuring Judy Santos)	2004	—	—	—	—	—	—	—	—	—		Love & Hate
"Mi Niña Cambió"	2004	—	—	—	—	—	—	—	—	—		Love & Hate
"La Boda"	2005	—	—	—	2	—	—	—	—	—		God's Project
"Ella y Yo" (featuring Don Omar)	2005	97	2	32	1	—	—	—	—	—		God's Project
"Un Beso"	2005	—	6	—	2	—	—	—	—	37		God's Project
"Angelito" (featuring Judy Santos)	2005	—	—	—	17	—	—	—	24	—		God's Project
"Los Infieles"	2006	—	4	—	1	—	—	—	27	—		K.O.B. Live
"Mi Corazoncito"	2007	— (Note: "Mi Corazoncito" did not enter the Billboard Hot 100, but peaked at number 7 on the Bubbling Under Hot 100 Singles chart.)	2	15	1	—	—	—	84	—		K.O.B. Live
"El Perdedor"	2007	—	5	7	1	—	—	—	—	—		K.O.B. Live
"Por Un Segundo"	2008	— (Note: "Por Un Segundo" did not enter the Billboard Hot 100, but peaked at number 9 on the Bubbling Under Hot 100 Singles chart.)	1	7	1	—	—	—	—	—		The Last
"El Burrito De Belén"	2008	—	—	—	—	—	—	—	—	—		Non-album single
"Dame La Mano Paloma"	2008	—	—	—	—	—	—	—	—	—		Non-album single
"All Up 2 You" (featuring Akon and Wisin & Yandel)	2009	— (Note: "All Up 2 You" did not enter the Billboard Hot 100, but peaked at number 8 on the Bubbling Under Hot 100 Singles chart.)	4	14	2	—	—	—	—	—		The Last
"Su Veneno"	2009	— (Note: "Su Veneno" did not enter the Billboard Hot 100, but peaked at number 22 on the Bubbling Under Hot 100 Singles chart.)	4	6	1	—	—	—	—	—		The Last
"Dile Al Amor"	2009	— (Note: "Dile Al Amor" did not enter the Billboard Hot 100, but peaked at number 2 on the Bubbling Under Hot 100 Singles chart.)	1	2	1	—	—	—	—	—	PROMUSICAE: Platinum	The Last
"El Malo"	2010	— (Note: "El Malo" did not enter the Billboard Hot 100, but peaked at number 16 on the Bubbling Under Hot 100 Singles chart.)	5	5	1	—	—	—	—	—		The Last
"Solo"	2010	—	—	—	—	—	—	—	—	—		Non-album single
"Inmortal"	2019	95	5	9	1	7	1	53	—	—	RIAA: Diamond (Latin); AMPROFON: Platinum; PROMUSICAE: Platinum	Utopía
"Volví" (with Bad Bunny)	2021	22	1	—	1	1	1	3	24	—	PROMUSICAE: 4× Platinum	Non-album single
"Brindo Con Agua"	2024	—	—	—	5	—	—	—	—	—	RIAA: Platinum (Latin)	2.0

=== As featured artist ===
Single	Year	Peak chart positions		Album
Single	Year	US	US Trop.	Album
"Noche de Sexo" (Wisin & Yandel featuring Aventura)	2006	4	10	Pa'l Mundo

=== Promotional singles ===
Single	Year	Chart positions			Album
Single	Year	US Latin	US Latin Pop	US Trop.	Album
"Alexandra"	2000	—	—	—	Generation Next
"La Novelita"	2000	—	—	—	Generation Next
"Amor Bonito"	2000	—	—	—	Generation Next
"No Lo Perdona Dios"	2000	—	—	—	Generation Next
"Un Poeta Enamorado"	2000	—	—	—	Generation Next
"9:15 (Nueve & Quince)"	2002	—	—	—	We Broke The Rules
"La Pelicula"	2003	—	—	—	Love & Hate
"Déjà Vu"	2003	—	—	—	Love & Hate
"Te Invito"	2003	—	—	—	Love & Hate
"Un Chi Chi"	2005	—	—	—	God's Project
"Voy Malacostumbrado"	2005	—	—	—	God's Project
"Ciego De Amor" (featuring Anthony "El Mayimbe" Santos)	2005	—	—	—	God's Project
"José" (featuring Miri Ben-Ari)	2006	—	—	—	K.O.B. Live
"El Desprecio"	2010	—	—	40	The Last
"Tu Jueguito"	2010	—	27	—	The Last
"La Curita"	2011	42	32	6	The Last
"La Tormenta"	2011	—	—	32	The Last
"Peligro"	2011	—	—	40	The Last

== Other collaboration songs ==
Single	Year	Chart positions				Album
Single	Year	US	US Latin	US Latin Pop	US Latin Trop	Album
"We Got The Crown" (with Tego Calderón)"	2004	—	—	—	—	El Enemy de los Guasíbiri
"You're Lying" (with Nina Sky)"	2005	—	—	—	—	God's Project
"We Got The Crown" (Remix) (with Tego Calderón)"	2005	—	—	—	—	God's Project
"Los Infieles" (Remix) (featuring Frankie J)"	2006	—	—	—	—	Non-album single
"Me Voy" (Remix) (with Héctor Acosta)"	2007	—	47 (Note: The song doesn't show up on Aventura nor Romeo Santos' chart history. Also, Hector Acosta doesn't have a chart history page nor anything archived. However, it does appear on Anthony Santos' chart history. This might be because Anthony and Romeo have the same name which could explain the confusion as it shows Romeo being shown as Anthony "Romeo" Santos.)	—	15 (Note: The song doesn't show up on Aventura nor Romeo Santos' chart history. Also, Hector Acosta doesn't have a chart history page nor anything archived. However, it does appear on Anthony Santos' chart history. This might be because Anthony and Romeo have the same name which could explain the confusion as it shows Romeo being shown as Anthony "Romeo" Santos.)	Mitad / Mitad
"Pam Pam (Remix)" (with Wisin & Yandel)"	2007	—	—	—	—	Non-album single
"El Perdedor" (Remix) (featuring Ken-Y)"	2008	—	—	—	—	Non-album single
"Spanish Fly" (featuring Ludacris and Wyclef Jean)	2009	—	—	—	—	The Last

== Videography ==
=== Music videos ===
Title	Year	Director(s)
"Cuando Volverás"	1999	
"Obsesión" (featuring Judy Santos)	2002	
"Obsesión" (2nd Music Video) (Judy was not included even though her voice was on the video.)	2002	
"Hermanita"	2003	Juan Basanta
"La Boda"	2005	Juan Basanta
"Ella & Yo" (featuring Don Omar)	2005	Ulysses Terrero
"Un Beso"	2005	Ulysses Terrero
"Los Infieles"	2006	Jessy Terrero
"Mi Corazoncito"	2007	Ulysses Terrero
"El Perdedor"	2008	
"Por Un Segundo"	2009	Jessy Terrero
"All Up 2 You" (featuring Akon, Wisin & Yandel)	2009	Jessy Terrero
"Su Veneno" (Bachata Version)	2009	Pablo Croce
"Su Veneno" (Bolero Version)	2009	Pablo Croce
"Dile Al Amor"	2009	
"El Malo"	2010	Pablo Croce
"Inmortal"	2019	Fernando Lugo
"Volví" (with Bad Bunny)	2021	Kacho López-Mari

=== Concert films and Music video albums ===
Title	Year	Type
Aventura In Concert: Sold Out at The United Palace	2003	Concert Film
We Broke The Rules (DVD)	2004	Highlight and Music Video Album
The Love & Hate Concert: Live at the United Palace	2005	Concert Film
Kings of Bachata: Sold Out at Madison Square Garden	2007	Concert Film
14 + 14	2004	Music Video Album
