= Todavía Me Amas: Lo Mejor De Aventura =

Greatest hits album by Aventura
- Released: February 4, 2016
- Recorded: 1999–2009
- Genre: Latin pop; bachata; tropical
- Label: Premium Latin; The Orchard; Sony Latin

Aventura chronology
Sólo Para Mujeres (2014)	Todavía Me Amas: Lo Mejor De Aventura (2016)

Todavía Me Amas: Lo Mejor De Aventura (English: You Still Love Me: The Best of Aventura) is a greatest hits album by bachata group Aventura. It contains the best songs from their five studio albums and three of their greatest hit studio songs from the live album K.O.B. Live. This album was named after the song "Todavía Me Amas (You Still Love Me)" from the album We Broke the Rules.

== Track listing ==
Todavía Me Amas: Lo Mejor De Aventura track listing
No.	Title	Translation	Length
1.	"Obsesión" (featuring Judy Santos)	"Obsession"	4:14
2.	"El Perdedor"	"The Loser"	3:35
3.	"Dile Al Amor"	"Tell Love"	3:50
4.	"Ella & Yo" (featuring Don Omar)	"She & I"	4:27
5.	"Todavía Me Amas"	"You Still Love Me"	4:43
6.	"Su Veneno"	"Her Poison"	4:18
7.	"Los Infieles"	"The Cheaters"	4:17
8.	"El Malo"	"The Bad Guy"	3:58
9.	"Un Beso"	"A Kiss"	4:23
10.	"Por Un Segundo"	"For One Second"	4:15
11.	"Enséñame A Olvidar"	"Show Me How to Forget"	5:52
12.	"Amor De Madre"	"A Mother's Love"	6:02
Total length:			57:48

Live bonus tracks
No.	Title	Translation	Length
13.	"Lagrimas" (Live) (Homenaje a José José)	"Tears" (A Tribute to José José)	3:45
14.	"Me Voy" (Live) (featuring Héctor Acosta "El Torito")	"I'm Leaving"	4:25
Total length:			61:42

Deluxe edition bonus tracks
No.	Title	Translation	Length
12.	"Mi Niña Cambió"	"My Girl Has Changed"	4:31
13.	"Amor De Madre"	"A Mother's Love"	6:02
14.	"Cuando Volverás"	"When Will You Come Back"	3:30
15.	"Hermanita"	"Little Sister"	4:35
16.	"La Boda"	"The Wedding"	4:49
17.	"Llorar"	"Cry"	4:07
18.	"Yo Quisiera Amarla"	"I Would Like To Love Her"	5:06
19.	"Mi Corazoncito"	"My Little Heart"	3:54
20.	"Te Invito"	I'm Inviting You	3:31
21.	"Angelito" (featuring Judy Santos)	"Little Angel"	4:53
22.	"Lagrimas" (Live) (Homenaje A José José)	"Tears" (A Tribute To José José)	3:45
23.	"Me Voy" (Live) (featuring Héctor Acosta "El Torito")	"I'm Leaving"	4:25

== Charts ==
=== Weekly charts ===
Weekly chart performance for Todavía Me Amas: Lo Mejor De Aventura
Chart (2016–2026)	Peak position
US Billboard 200	156
US Independent Albums (Billboard)	37
US Top Latin Albums (Billboard)	4
US Tropical Albums (Billboard)	1

=== Year-end charts ===
Year-end chart performance for Todavía Me Amas: Lo Mejor De Aventura
Chart (2016)	Position
US Top Latin Albums (Billboard)	46
US Tropical Albums (Billboard)	3
Chart (2017)	Position
US Top Latin Albums (Billboard)	11
US Tropical Albums (Billboard)	4
Chart (2018)	Position
US Top Latin Albums (Billboard)	7
US Tropical Albums (Billboard)	2
Chart (2019)	Position
US Top Latin Albums (Billboard)	8
US Tropical Albums (Billboard)	1
Chart (2020)	Position
US Top Latin Albums (Billboard)	6
US Tropical Albums (Billboard)	1
Chart (2021)	Position
US Top Latin Albums (Billboard)	16
US Tropical Albums (Billboard)	1
Chart (2022)	Position
US Top Latin Albums (Billboard)	20
US Tropical Albums (Billboard)	1
Chart (2023)	Position
US Top Latin Albums (Billboard)	21
US Tropical Albums (Billboard)	1

== Certifications ==
Certifications for Todavía Me Amas: Lo Mejor De Aventura
Region	Certification	Certified units/sales
United States (RIAA)	3× Platinum (Latin)	180,000^{‡}
^{‡} Sales+streaming figures based on certification alone.
