= 14 + 14 =

Greatest hits album by Aventura
- Released: May 23, 2011
- Recorded: 1999–2009
- Genres: Latin pop, bachata, tropical
- Labels: Premium Latin; Sony Latin

Aventura chronology
The Last (2009)	14 + 14 (2011)	Solo Para Mujeres (2014)

Professional ratings
Review scores
Source	Rating
Allmusic	4/5 stars

14 + 14, also spelled 14 plus 14, is a CD and DVD greatest hits album by bachata group Aventura. It contains the songs and music videos from five studio albums and from the live album K.O.B. Live. Every song that has had a music video is on this album, with the exception of "All Up 2 You" which featured Akon and Wisin & Yandel.

== Tracklist ==
All tracks are written by Anthony "Romeo" Santos.

CD
No.	Title	Translation	Length
1.	"Cuando Volverás"	"When Will You Come Back"	3:30
2.	"Obsesión" (featuring Judy Santos)	"Obsession"	4:14
3.	"Hermanita"	"Little Sister"	4:35
4.	"La Boda"	"The Wedding"	4:49
5.	"Un Beso"	"A Kiss"	4:23
6.	"Ella & Yo" (featuring Don Omar)	"She and I"	4:27
7.	"Mi Corazoncito"	"My Little Heart"	3:54
8.	"Los Infieles"	"The Cheaters"	4:17
9.	"El Perdedor"	"The Loser"	3:35
10.	"Por Un Segundo"	"For One Second"	4:15
11.	"Su Veneno (Bolero Version)"	"Her Poison (Bolero Version)"	3:51
12.	"Su Veneno (Bachata Version)"	"Her Poison (Bachata Version)"	4:18
13.	"Dile Al Amor"	"Tell Love"	3:49
14.	"El Malo"	"The Bad Guy"	3:58
Total length:			57:48

DVD
No.	Title	Translation	Length
1.	"Cuando Volverás"	"When Will You Come Back"	5:44
2.	"Obsesión" (featuring Judy Santos)	"Obsession"	4:13
3.	"Hermanita"	"Little Sister"	5:18
4.	"La Boda"	"The Wedding"	5:11
5.	"Un Beso"	"A Kiss"	4:42
6.	"Ella & Yo" (featuring Don Omar)	"She and I"	4:32
7.	"Mi Corazoncito"	"My Little Heart"	3:55
8.	"Los Infieles"	"The Cheaters"	4:30
9.	"El Perdedor"	"The Loser"	3:48
10.	"Por Un Segundo"	"For One Second"	5:09
11.	"Su Veneno (Bolero Version)"	"Her Poison (Bolero Version)"	3:49
12.	"Su Veneno (Bachata Version)"	"Her Poison (Bachata Version)"	4:07
13.	"Dile Al Amor"	"Tell Love"	3:50
14.	"El Malo"	"The Bad Guy"	5:46

Bonus Material
No.	Title	Translation	Length
1.	"La Historia De Aventura (Spanish EPK)"	The Story Of Aventura (Spanish EPK)	9:27
2.	"La Historia De Aventura (English EPK)"	The Story Of Aventura (English EPK)	9:27
Total length:			18:54

== Charts ==
=== Weekly charts ===
Chart (2011)	Peak Position
US Billboard 200	132
US Top Current Album Sales (Billboard)	115
US Top Latin Albums (Billboard)	1
US Tropical Albums (Billboard)	1

=== Year-end charts ===
Chart (2011)	Position
US Top Latin Albums (Billboard)	26
US Tropical Albums (Billboard)	4
Chart (2012)	Position
US Top Latin Albums (Billboard)	51
US Tropical Albums (Billboard)	4
