= Kings of Bachata: Sold Out at Madison Square Garden =

Kings of Bachata: Sold Out At Madison Square Garden

Live album by Aventura
- Released: November 13, 2007 (U.S.)
- Recorded: September 1, 2007; New York City, New York
- Venue: Madison Square Garden
- Genre: Bachata
- Length: Disc 1: 46:38; Disc 2: 44:18
- Labels: Premium Latin Music; Sony International

Aventura chronology
| K.O.B. Live (2006) | Kings of Bachata: Sold Out At Madison Square Garden (2007) | The Last (2009) |

Professional ratings
Review scores
| Source | Rating |
|---|---|
| Allmusic | 2/5 stars |

Kings of Bachata: Sold Out At Madison Square Garden is the third live album released by bachata group Aventura. It is based on the sold out concert that took place on September 1, 2007 at Madison Square Garden. This was part of the K.O.B. Live tour. The live album and film of the concert was released on November 13, 2007. The album was certified 8× Platinum (Latin) by the Recording Industry Association of America on June 4, 2009 for shipping 800,000 copies in the United States.

== Track listing ==
=== CD ===
Disc 1
| No. | Title | Translation | Length |
|---|---|---|---|
| 1. | "Intro" (featuring Gerry Grimaud Jr.) | | 1:51 |
| 2. | "Los Infieles" | "The Cheaters" | 4:28 |
| 3. | "Angelito" | "Little Angel" | 4:33 |
| 4. | "Hermanita" | "Little Sister" | 4:35 |
| 5. | "Enséñame A Olvidar" | "Show Me How to Forget" | 6:54 |
| 6. | "Medley: Amor De Madre/Mi Niña Cambió/Un Chi Chi Medley" | Medley: "A Mother's Love/My Girl Changed/A Baby Medley" | 10:41 |
| 7. | "La Película" | "The Movie" | 4:42 |
| 8. | "Lloro" | "Cry" | 3:59 |
| 9. | "9:15" | | 1:42 |
| 10. | "Voy Malacostumbrado" | "I'm Unaccustomed" | 3:09 |
| 11. | "Me Voy" (featuring Héctor Acosta "El Torito") | "I'm Leaving" | 4:25 |
| 12. | "Ella & Yo" (featuring Don Omar) | "She And I" | 4:30 |
| Total length: | | | 46:38 |

Disc 2
| No. | Title | Translation | Length |
|---|---|---|---|
| 1. | "José" (featuring Miri Ben-Ari) | "Joseph" | 4:33 |
| 2. | "Todavía Me Amas" | "You Still Love Me" | 4:45 |
| 3. | "El Perdedor" | "The Loser" | 4:00 |
| 4. | "Noche de Sexo" (featuring Wisin & Yandel) | "Night Of Sex" | 3:13 |
| 5. | "Medley Old School Aventura: Alexandra/No Lo Perdona Dios/Amor Bonito/¿Cuándo Volverás?" | "Aventura's Old School Medley: Alexandra/God Won't Forgive It/Pretty Love/When Will You Come Back?" | 8:22 |
| 6. | "La Boda" | "The Wedding" | 6:00 |
| 7. | "Mujeriego" | "Womanizer" | 2:14 |
| 8. | "Ciego De Amor" (featuring Anthony Santos "El Mayimbe") | "Blind By Love" | 2:12 |
| 9. | "Un Beso" | "A Kiss" | 5:17 |
| 10. | "Mi Corazoncito" | "My Little Heart" | 4:20 |
| Total length: | | | 44:18 |

=== DVD ===
| No. | Title | Translation | Length |
|---|---|---|---|
| 1. | "Intro" (featuring Gerry Grimaud Jr.) | | 1:51 |
| 2. | "Los Infieles" | "The Cheaters" | 4:28 |
| 3. | "Angelito" | "Little Angel" | 4:33 |
| 4. | "Hermanita" | "Little Sister" | 4:35 |
| 5. | "Enséñame A Olvidar" | "Show Me How to Forget" | 6:54 |
| 6. | "Medley: Amor De Madre/Mi Niña Cambió/Un Chi Chi Medley" | Medley: "A Mother's Love/My Girl Changed/A Baby Medley" | 10:41 |
| 7. | "La Película" | "The Movie" | 4:42 |
| 8. | "Lloro" | "Cry" | 3:59 |
| 9. | "9:15" | | 1:42 |
| 10. | "Voy Malacostumbrado" | "I'm Unaccustomed" | 3:09 |
| 11. | "Me Voy" (featuring Héctor Acosta "El Torito") | "I'm Leaving" | 4:25 |
| 12. | "Ella & Yo" (featuring Don Omar) | "She And I" | 4:30 |
| 13. | "Iraq Soldier Tribute: Lament" (featuring Miri Ben-Ari) | | 0:40 |
| 14. | "José" (featuring Miri Ben-Ari) | "Joseph" | 4:33 |
| 15. | "Todavía Me Amas" | "You Still Love Me" | 4:45 |
| 16. | "El Perdedor" | "The Loser" | 4:00 |
| 17. | "Te Invito (Acapella)" | "I Invite You" | 0:30 |
| 18. | "Noche de Sexo" (featuring Wisin & Yandel) | "Night Of Sex" | 3:13 |
| 19. | "Medley Old School Aventura: Alexandra/No Lo Perdona Dios/Amor Bonito/¿Cuándo Volverás?" | "Aventura's Old School Medley: Alexandra/God Won't Forgive It/Pretty Love/When Will You Come Back?" | 8:22 |
| 20. | "Mujeriego" | "Womanizer" | 2:14 |
| 21. | "Ciego De Amor" (featuring Anthony Santos "El Mayimbe") | "Blind By Love" | 2:12 |
| 22. | "Un Beso" | "A Kiss" | 5:17 |
| 23. | "Mi Corazoncito" | "My Little Heart" | 4:20 |
| Total length: | | | 1:52:57 |

Bonus Track
| No. | Title | Length |
|---|---|---|
| 24. | "Wanna Make You Mine" (featuring Toby Love) | 4:20 |
| Total length: | | 1:57:17 |

- The song "La Boda" ("The Wedding") was not included in the concert film, only audio.
- The song "La Novelita" ("The Little Soap Opera") was part of "Medley Old School Aventura" but it was referred on this live album as "Amor Bonito (Beautiful Love)", which is another song and The sequel to "La Novelita" song. It even had the words "La Novela 2" ("The Soap Opera 2") next to the title "Amor Bonito". The reasons for this is unknown since no questions have ever been ask about why the title was different from the actual song.
- Both CD and DVD have the song "Llorar (Cry)". However, it is shown on the tracklist as 'Lloro". It also means cry depending on the sentence or on what you are referring to.
- The DVD included special segments to introduce the next song involving the topic of it. Romeo only sang a piece of "Te Invito (I Invite You)" and then talked about what some people have said about it. This is why it's not in the CD version. The song "Wanna Make You Mine" was also not included in the CD version. This was probably because it was a bonus performance by Max Agenda and Toby Love, which did not feature the other members.

== Charts ==
=== Weekly charts ===
| Chart (2007) | Peak position |
|---|---|
| US Billboard 200 | 97 |
| US Top Current Album Sales (Billboard) | 97 |
| US Top Latin Albums (Billboard) | 3 |
| US Tropical Albums (Billboard) | 1 |

=== Year-end charts ===
| Chart (2008) | Position |
|---|---|
| US Top Latin Albums (Billboard) | 6 |
| US Tropical Albums (Billboard) | 1 |
| Chart (2009) | Position |
| US Top Latin Albums (Billboard) | 13 |
| US Tropical Albums (Billboard) | 2 |

== Sales and certifications ==
| Region | Certification | Certified units/sales |
|---|---|---|
| United States (RIAA) | 8× Platinum (Latin) | 800,000^{^} |
^{^} Shipments figures based on certification alone.

== See also ==
- List of number-one Billboard Tropical Albums from the 2000s
