= Sólo Para Mujeres (Aventura album) =

Compilation album by Aventura
- Released: November 4, 2014
- Recorded: 1999–2009
- Genre: Latin pop; bachata; tropical
- Length: 62:53
- Label: Premium Latin; Sony Latin

Aventura chronology
14 + 14 (2011)	Sólo Para Mujeres (2014)	Todavía Me Amas: Lo Mejor De Aventura (2016)

Sólo Para Mujeres (English: Only for Women) is a compilation album by bachata group Aventura. It was part of a series of albums with the same title from different artists, such as Gilberto Santa Rosa, Víctor Manuelle, Ricardo Arjona, and Alexis & Fido among others.

== Tracklist ==
No.	Title	Translation	Length
1.	"Mi Corazoncito"	"My Little Heart"	3:54
2.	"Los Infieles"	"The Cheaters"	4:17
3.	"Obsesión" (featuring Judy Santos)	"Obsesion"	4:14
4.	"Cuando Volverás"	"When Will You Come Back"	3:30
5.	"I Believe" (featuring Toby Love)	"Yo Creo"	4:37
6.	"Peligro"	Danger	4:38
7.	"Angelito" (featuring Judy Santos)	"Little Angel"	4:53
8.	"La Película"	"The Movie"	5:29
9.	"Si Me Dejas, Muero"	"If You Leave Me, I'll Die"	4:44
10.	"Por un Segundo"	"For One Second"	4:15
11.	"Yo Quisiera Amarla"	"I Would Like To Love Her"	5:06
12.	"Dile al Amor"	"Tell Love"	3:50
13.	"La Boda"	"The Wedding"	4:49
14.	"Un Beso"	"A Kiss"	4:23
Total length:			62:53

== Charts ==
=== Weekly charts ===
Chart (2014–18)	Peak Position
US Top Latin Albums (Billboard)	15
US Tropical Albums (Billboard)	3

=== Year-end charts ===
Chart (2015)	Position
US Top Latin Albums (Billboard)	34
US Tropical Albums (Billboard)	7
Chart (2017)	Position
US Top Latin Albums (Billboard)	93
US Tropical Albums (Billboard)	11
