= K.O.B. Live =

Live album by Aventura
- Released: December 19, 2006 (U.S.)
- Recorded: 2006; Live performances: New York City, NY; Boston, MA; Puerto Rico; Colombia; La Romana, Dominican Republic
- Venues: Madison Square Garden; Altos de Chavón; Among other venues
- Genre: Bachata
- Length: Disc 1: 46:38; Disc 2: 44:18
- Labels: Premium Latin Music; Sony International

Aventura chronology
| God's Project (2005) | K.O.B. Live (2006) | Kings of Bachata: Sold Out at Madison Square Garden (2007) |

Singles from K.O.B. Live
- 1. "Los Infieles" Released: July 3, 2006; 2. "Mi Corazoncito" Released: January 15, 2007; 3. "El Perdedor" Released: October 29, 2007

Professional ratings
Review scores
| Source | Rating |
|---|---|
| AllMusic | 3/5 stars |

K.O.B. Live (Kings of Bachata Live) is the second live album released by bachata group Aventura by Premiun Latin Music distributed by Sony Music Latin. It was recorded during the promotion concert tour for their fourth studio album God's Project (2005). The tracks were recorded live in three United States locations: New York City, Boston, and Puerto Rico. They also recorded in Dominican Republic and Colombia. It also contains a DVD with videos of the performance at Altos de Chavón in La Romana, Dominican Republic and at the Madison Square Garden theater in New York. In the first, the group played before some 6,000 people, while in the second they made history by becoming the first bachata group to sell all the tickets before the event for that venue.

The album is a double-disc live album and a bonus DVD. It contains all of their greatest hits at the time, along with several skits and other between-song banter. The first disc contains five new tracks, exploring lyrics of love, romance, sex and infidelity with their typical fusions of Bachata, R&B and spanglish lyrics. The album was supported by the released of three official singles: "Los Infieles", "Mi Corazoncito" and "El Perdedor". Following the success of the album, it won Tropical Album of the Year, Duo or Group at the 2007 Billboard Latin Music Awards and Tropical Album of the Year at the Premios Lo Nuestro 2008. Also, the band won Best International Band at the 23rd annual Soberano Awards, at the time named the Casandra Awards. K.O.B Live received generally positive reviews by the critics.

== Background ==
In 2005, Aventura released their fourth album God's Project. It was a commercial success and was considered the band's mainstream breakthrough album. To promote the album, the band embarked on a highly successful tour. The tour started at Fortaleza Ozana in Santo Domingo on July 29, 2005. After that, the tour continued to some countries in Europe, visiting cities including Paris, Zurich, Milan, Vienna, Amberes, Madrid and Amsterdam, as well as the United States. The tour continued in Central and South America.

On March 8, 2006, it was revealed to the press the band's intentions to drop a live album (Kings of Bachata Live) that will include the interpretations they have made of some of their songs in different concerts in Latin America and Europe. The next day, the band performed a sold out concert at the Theater at Madison Square Garden. On March 27, 2006, the group performed at Altos de Chavon amphitheater and was reported sold out. Local media noticed that despite the high risk that this venue represented, the band sold all the tickets. Also it was revealed that the concert was going to be recorded to be released as a DVD sometime in the future.

== Singles ==
"Los Infieles" is the first single. It was released on October 19, 2006. It peaked at number 4 on the Billboard Hot Latin Songs chart and at number 1 on the Billboard Tropical Airplay chart. A remix was made which featured Mexican singer Frankie J.

"Mi Corazoncito" is the second single. It peaked at number 7 on the Bubbling Under Hot 100, number 2 on the Billboard Hot Latin Songs chart and at number 1 on the Billboard Latin Rhythm and Tropical Airplay charts. The music video was released on April 3, 2007. It featured the Miss Universe 2003 pageant winner Amelia Vega.

"El Perdedor" is the third single. It peaked at number 5 on the Billboard Hot Latin Songs chart and at number 1 on the Billboard Latin Rhythm and Tropical Airplay charts. The music video was released in 2008 and it featured highlights from the group's 2007 show at MSG. It was based on the concert film Kings of Bachata: Sold Out at Madison Square Garden. A remix was made which featured Puerto Rican singer and rapper Ken-Y.

== Commercial performance ==
K.O.B Live was a commercial success. It remained the top-selling album on the chart for 23 non-consecutive weeks in 2007 at US Tropical Albums. Eventually, it was the second best selling Latin album in the United States of 2007 and the top selling tropical album of 2007. It was certified six times platinum (Latin field) by the RIAA. All of the album singles reached the top five on the US Hot Latin Songs chart and topped the US Tropical Airplay chart. Also, it charted on the Mexican, Italian and Swiss album charts. To promote the new tracks of the album, Aventura embarked on a highly successful K.O.B Live Tour, visiting Latin America and United States, breaking some attendance records in New York and Puerto Rico. In 2007, "Voy Malacostumbrado" was featured in the Dominican comedy film Sanky Panky, directed by José Enrique Pintor, the first installment in the film series.

== Track listing ==
Disc 1
| No. | Title | Translation | Length |
|---|---|---|---|
| 1. | "Intro (Los Reyes De La Bachata Moderna)" | "Intro (The Kings Of Modern Bachata)" | 1:04 |
| 2. | "Los Infieles" | "The Cheaters" | 4:17 |
| 3. | "Mi Corazoncito" | "My Little Heart" | 3:54 |
| 4. | "El Perdedor" | "The Loser" | 3:35 |
| 5. | "Controversia" | "Controversy" | 3:55 |
| 6. | "José" (featuring Miri Ben-Ari) | "Joseph" | 4:13 |
| 7. | "Skit Anthony 1" | | 0:23 |
| 8. | "Un Beso" (Live) | "A Kiss" (Live) | 4:57 |
| 9. | "Cuando Volverás" (Live) | "When Will You Come Back" (Live) | 3:48 |
| 10. | "Skit Lenny" | | 0:21 |
| 11. | "Llorar" (Live) | "Cry" (Live) | 4:23 |
| 12. | "Angelito" (Live) | "Little Angel" (Live) | 4:15 |
| 13. | "Hermanita" (Live) & "Romeo Skit" | "Little Sister" (Live) & "Romeo Skit" | 7:23 |
| Total length: | | | 46:38 |

Disc 2
| No. | Title | Translation | Length |
|---|---|---|---|
| 1. | "Skit Henry" | | 0:35 |
| 2. | "La Película" (Live) | "The Movie" (Live) | 4:40 |
| 3. | "Todavía Me Amas" (Live) | "You Still Love Me" (Live) | 4:51 |
| 4. | "Obsesión" (Live) | "Obsession" (Live) | 3:59 |
| 5. | "Amor De Madre" (Live) | "A Mother's Love" (Live) | 4:20 |
| 6. | "Skit Mikey" | | 0:36 |
| 7. | "Medley: No lo Perdona Dios / Un Poeta Enamorado / La Novelita" (Live) | "Medley: God Won't Forgive it/A Poet In Love/The Little Soap Opera" (Live) | 8:47 |
| 8. | "La Boda" (Live) | "The Wedding" (Live) | 4:11 |
| 9. | "Skit Anthony 2" | | 0:52 |
| 10. | "Enséñame A Olvidar" (Live) | "Show Me How to Forget" (Live) | 5:32 |
| 11. | "Voy Malacostumbrado" (Live) | "I'm Unaccustomed" (Live) | 4:52 |
| 12. | "Outro" | | 1:09 |
| Total length: | | | 44:18 |

DVD
| No. | Title | Translation | Length |
|---|---|---|---|
| 1. | "Altos De Chavón" (Video) | | 5:52 |
| 2. | "Madison Square Garden: Ella & Yo /Por Tu Orgullo / Angelito" (Video) | "Madison Square Garden: Her and I / For Your Pride / Little Angel" (Video) | 13:04 |
| 3. | "Fanáticos" (Video) | "Fans" (Video) | 4:53 |
| 4. | "Los Infieles" (Music Video) | "The Cheaters" (Music Video) | 4:29 |
| Total length: | | | 28:18 |

== Charts ==
=== Weekly charts ===
| Chart (2006–2007) | Peak position |
|---|---|
| Mexican International Chart Albums | 12 |
| Italian Albums (FIMI) | 75 |
| Swiss Albums (Schweizer Hitparade) | 25 |
| US Billboard 200 | 124 |
| US Heatseekers Albums (Billboard) | 1 |
| US Top Current Album Sales (Billboard) | 124 |
| US Top Latin Albums (Billboard) | 2 |
| US Tropical Albums (Billboard) | 1 |

=== Year-end charts ===
| Chart (2007) | Position |
|---|---|
| US Top Latin Albums (Billboard) | 2 |
| US Tropical Albums (Billboard) | 1 |
| Chart (2008) | Position |
| US Top Latin Albums (Billboard) | 28 |
| US Tropical Albums (Billboard) | 4 |

== Sales and certifications ==
| Region | Certification | Certified units/sales |
|---|---|---|
| United States (RIAA) | 6× Platinum (Latin) | 358,000 |

== See also ==
- List of number-one Billboard Tropical Albums from the 2000s
