= Bachata Romántica: 1's =

Compilation album by Various Artist
- Released: January 27, 2009
- Recorded: 2004–2008
- Genre: Bachata
- Length: 45:55
- Language: Spanish
- Label: Machete Music
- Producer: Anthony Santos, Lenny Santos, Monserrate & DJ Urba, Los Magnificos

Various Artist chronology
Bachata Romántica: 1's (2009)	Bachata Romántica 1's, Vol. 2 (2010)

Bachata Romántica: 1's (English: Romantic Bachata: #1's) is a compilation album released by Machete Music on January 27, 2009. The album includes tracks recorded by several artists from the bachata genre, such as Aventura, Ivy Queen, R.K.M. & Ken-Y, Jayco, Watson Brazoban, José Feliciano, Monchy & Alexandra, Frank Reyes, El Chaval de la Bachata, Zacarías Ferreíra, Daniel Monción, Fanny Lu, Toby Love and Xtreme, featuring content dating back to 2004.

Upon release, the album peaked at number eighteen on Billboard Latin Albums chart and number two on the Billboard Tropical Albums chart. It became the ninth best-selling Tropical Album of 2009. Several songs included on the album were released as singles from their respective parent albums including the opening "Un Beso" by Aventura and "Dime" by Ivy Queen. A second volume to the album was released in 2010 entitled Bachata Romántica 1's, Vol. 2.

== Background and repertoire ==
Bachata Romántica: 1's was released by Machete Music on January 27, 2009, in the United States, two weeks before Valentine's Day to gain holiday sales boost. 30,000 copies of the album were shipped to stores, being supported by a television campaign on Univision, mun2 and MTV Tr3s. "Un Beso", written by Anthony "Romeo" Santos and performed by Aventura, was released as the fourth and final single from the group's fourth studio album, God's Project (2005). The song peaked at number six and two on the Billboard Latin Songs and Billboard Tropical Songs charts respectively. The bachata and R&B number, has been named one of their biggest hits along with "Los Infieles", "El Perdedor", and "Mi Corazoncito" among others. "Dime" was written by Ivy Queen along with the producers Monserrate & DJ Urba. It was serviced to radio as the lead single from Queen's first live album, Ivy Queen 2008 World Tour LIVE! (2008) in both bachaton and bachata versions. It peaked at number eight on the Billboard Latin Songs chart, number four on the Billboard Tropical Songs chart, and number one on the Billboard Latin Rhythm Airplay chart. It spent seven consecutive weeks atop the chart. "Te Amaré" performed by R.K.M & Ken-Y in collaboration with Jayco was previously featured on the duo's second studio effort, The Royalty: La Realeza (2008).

Monchy & Alexandra "No Es Una Novela" (2006)
A 21-second sample of the pop-bachata "No Es Una Novela" performed by Monchy & Alexandra, which gave the duo their second number-one Tropical single.

"En Un Solo Día" is originally included and performed on the 2007 album Armadura de Rosas by Negros. "No Es Una Novela" by Monchy & Alexandra features pop-bachata ballad tempo with "romantic, slick, well-produced sound" as does the rest of the compilation of hits Éxitos y Más (2006), the parent album according to Evan Gutierrez of Allmusic. It reached number twenty-nine on the Billboard Latin Songs chart, however topped the Billboard Tropical Songs chart. Frank Reyes performed "Te Regalo El Mar" from the album of the same title. It became a top ten hit on the Billboard Tropical Songs chart. "Es Tan Dificil" performed by Zacarías Ferreíra combines vallenato with bachata. Daniel Monción's rendition of "Culpable" reached number twelve on the Billboard Tropical Songs chart, originating from his second studio album Decidi (2008). "Y Si Te Digo" was originally featured on Lágrimas Cálidas (2006) by Fanny Lu". It topped both the Billboard Latin and Tropical song charts while reaching the top five of the Billboard Latin Pop Songs chart. "Te Extraño" is the oldest track on the album being included on Xtreme's 2004 self-titled album. The song was the duo's first big hit in the United States. It reached number thirty-one on the Billboard Latin Songs chart and thirteen on the Billboard Tropical Songs chart. "Dime", "No Es Una Novela", and "Es Tan Dificil" were the selected "Allmusic Picks" from the album by Allmusic.

== Reception and commercial performance ==
Upon release, the album debuted at number thirty-three on the Billboard Top Latin Albums chart for the week of February 14, 2009. As sales increased, following the week of Valentine's Day, the album rose twelve positions to number twenty-one, becoming the weeks greatest gainer for the issue dated February 21, 2009. In its third week, it rose two more positions to its peak of number eighteen. On the Billboard Tropical Albums chart, it debuted at the number three spot, behind A Man And His Songs: Alma De Poeta by Tite Curet Alonso and Aventura's Kings Of Bachata: Sold Out At Madison Square Garden (2007).

In its second week, it rose to the number two spot, being held off by Kings Of Bachata: Sold Out At Madison Square Garden, which held the number one position for sixty-four weeks. It spent eleven weeks within the top three, trading positions every other week with Gilberto Santa Rosa's El Caballero de la Salsa (2009). Bachata Romántica: 1's became the ninth best-selling Tropical Album of 2009. Five of the songs on this release are top-ten singles, these include "Un Beso", "Dime", "No Es Una Novela", "Te Regalo El Mar", and "Y Si Te Digo".

== Track listing ==
- Track listing adapted from the album liner notes.

No.	Title	Writer(s)	Performer(s)	Length
1.	"Un Beso"	Anthony Santos	Aventura	4:24
2.	"Dime"	Martha Pesante, Urbani Cedeño, Michael Monserrate	Ivy Queen	3:44
3.	"Te Amaré"	Rafeal Pina, Jose Nieves, Kenny Vazquez, Gabriel Cruz	R.K.M & Ken-Y featuring Jayco	4:17
4.	"En Un Solo Día"	Watson Brazoban	Watson Brazoban	3:10
5.	"Querube"	Pedro Flores	José Feliciano	3:09
6.	"No Es Una Novela"	Daniel Cruz	Monchy & Alexandra	3:40
7.	"Te Regalo El Mar"	Gilberto D'Olego	Frank Reyes	3:40
8.	"Amor Gitano"	Héctor Flores	El Chaval de la Bachata	4:21
9.	"Es Tan Dificil"	Omar Geles	Zacarías Ferreíra	4:21
10.	"Culpable"	Daniel Monción	Daniel Monción	3:38
11.	"Y Si Te Digo"	José Gaviria	Fanny Lu featuring Toby Love	4:07
12.	"Te Extraño"	Danny Mejia	Xtreme	3:32
Total length:				45:55

== Charts ==
=== Weekly charts ===
Chart (2009)	Peak Position
US Top Latin Albums (Billboard)	18
US Tropical Albums (Billboard)	2

=== Yearly charts ===
Chart (2009)	Peak Position
US Tropical Albums (Billboard)	9
