= List of Billboard Tropical Albums number ones from the 2010s =

The Billboard Tropical Albums chart, published in Billboard magazine, is a record chart that features Latin music sales information in regard to tropical music. The data is compiled by Nielsen SoundScan from a sample that includes music stores, music departments at electronics and department stores, Internet sales (both physical and digital) and verifiable sales from concert venues in the United States.

== Number one albums ==
Key

† – Best-selling Tropical album of the year

Artist	Album	Reached number one	Weeks at number one
Aventura	The Last	2 January 2010	24
La India	Unica	19 June 2010	1
Juan Luis Guerra	A Son de Guerra	26 June 2010	3
Gilberto Santa Rosa	Irrepetible	17 July 2010	1
Juan Luis Guerra	A Son de Guerra	24 July 2010	6
Manny Manuel	Rayando El Sol	4 September 2010	2
Prince Royce	Prince Royce	18 September 2010	12
El Gran Combo de Puerto Rico	Salsa: Un Homenaje a El Gran Combo	18 December 2010	5
Artist	Album	Reached number one	Weeks at number one
Prince Royce	Prince Royce	22 January 2011	21
Aventura	14 + 14	18 June 2011	1
Prince Royce	Prince Royce	25 June 2011	12
Aventura	14 + 14	17 September 2011	1
Prince Royce	Prince Royce	24 September 2011	7
Charlie Zaa	De Bohemia	12 November 2011	1
Prince Royce	Prince Royce	19 November 2011	1
Romeo Santos	Formula, Vol. 1	26 November 2011	20
Artist	Album	Reached number one	Weeks at number one
Prince Royce	Phase II	28 April 2012	11
N'Klabe	La Salsa Vive: "Salsa Lives"	14 July 2012	1
Prince Royce	Phase II	21 July 2012	7
Romeo Santos	Formula, Vol. 1	8 September 2012	2
Prince Royce	Phase II	22 September 2012	2
Romeo Santos	Formula, Vol. 1	6 October 2012	1
Prince Royce	Phase II	13 October 2012	6
Romeo Santos	The King Stays King: Sold Out at Madison Square Garden	24 November 2012	1
Tito "El Bambino"	Invicto	8 December 2012	3
Romeo Santos	The King Stays King: Sold Out at Madison Square Garden	29 December 2012	4
Artist	Album	Reached number one	Weeks at number one
Tito "El Bambino"	Invicto	26 January 2013	1
Prince Royce	# 1's	2 February 2013	2
Romeo Santos	The King Stays King: Sold Out at Madison Square Garden	16 February 2013	1
Prince Royce	# 1's	23 February 2013	1
Romeo Santos	The King Stays King: Sold Out at Madison Square Garden	2 March 2013	1
Prince Royce	# 1's	9 March 2013	4
Romeo Santos	Formula, Vol. 1	6 April 2013	8
Juan Luis Guerra	Asondeguerra Tour	1 June 2013	6
Various Artists	Sergio George Presents: Salsa Giants	13 July 2013	4
Marc Anthony	3.0	10 August 2013	11
Prince Royce	Soy el Mismo	26 October 2013	6
Marc Anthony	3.0	7 December 2013	14
Artist	Album	Reached number one	Weeks at number one
Romeo Santos	Formula, Vol. 2	15 March 2014	37
Juan Luis Guerra	Todo Tiene Su Hora	29 November 2014	2
Romeo Santos	Formula, Vol. 2	13 December 2014	2
Various artists	Que Lindo es Puerto Rico	27 December 2014	2
Artist	Album	Reached number one	Weeks at number one
Romeo Santos	Formula, Vol. 2	10 January 2015	7
Gilberto Santa Rosa	Necesito un Bolero	28 February 2015	1
Romeo Santos	Formula, Vol. 2	7 March 2015	5
Buena Vista Social Club	Lost and Found	11 April 2015	3
Tony Succar	Unity: The Latin Tribute to Michael Jackson	2 May 2015	1
Víctor Manuelle	Que Suenen los Tambores	9 May 2015	1
Romeo Santos	Formula, Vol. 2	16 May 2015	1
Víctor Manuelle	Que Suenen los Tambores	23 May 2015	1
Romeo Santos	Formula, Vol. 2	30 May 2015	3
Charlie Aponte	Una Nueva Historia	20 June 2015	2
Romeo Santos	Formula, Vol. 2	11 July 2015	3
La India	Intensamente con Juan Gabriel	1 August 2015	4
Romeo Santos	Formula, Vol. 2	29 August 2015	9
Víctor Manuelle	Que Suenen los Tambores	31 October 2015	2
Romeo Santos	Formula, Vol. 2	14 November 2015	3
Charlie Zaa	Mi Mejor Regalo	5 December 2015	1
Various Artists	Cuba y Puerto Rico Son...	12 December 2015	1
Romeo Santos	Formula, Vol. 2	19 December 2015	1
Various Artists	Cuba y Puerto Rico Son...	26 December 2015	5
Artist	Album	Reached number one	Weeks at number one
Marc Anthony	3.0	30 January 2016	1
Various Artists	Cuba y Puerto Rico Son...	6 February 2016	2
Marc Anthony	3.0	20 February 2016	1
Aventura	Todavía Me Amas: Lo Mejor De Aventura	27 February 2016	1
Marc Anthony	3.0	5 March 2016	5
Various Artists	Latin Hits 2016: Club Edition	9 April 2016	1
Marc Anthony	3.0	16 April 2016	2
Various Artists	Latin Hits 2016: Club Edition	30 April 2016	1
Marc Anthony	3.0	7 May 2016	1
Gente de Zona	Visualizate	14 May 2016	1
Manny Manuel	Pegate de Mi Mambo	21 May 2016	1
Gente de Zona	Visualizate	28 May 2016	5
The Pedrito Martinez Group	Habana Dreams	2 July 2016	1
La Tribu de Abrante	Otro Formato de Musica	9 July 2016	1
Toby Love	Bachata Nation	16 July 2016	1
Gente de Zona	Visualizate	23 July 2016	2
La Tribu de Abrante	Otro Formato de Musica	6 August 2016	1
Gente de Zona	Visualizate	13 August 2016	3
Toby Love	Bachata Nation	3 September 2016	1
Gente de Zona	Visualizate	10 September 2016	1
El Gran Combo de Puerto Rico	Alunizando	17 September 2016	3
Gente de Zona	Visualizate	8 October 2016	5
La Sonora Dinamita	Juntos Por La Sonora	12 November 2016	1
Diego el Cigala	Indestructible	19 November 2016	1
La Sonora Dinamita	Juntos Por La Sonora	26 November 2016	1
Chigualito	Son del Mar	3 December 2016	1
La Sonora Dinamita	Juntos Por La Sonora	10 December 2016	1
Gente de Zona	Visualizate	17 December 2016	1
Jose Nogueras	La Monto Dondequiera	24 December 2016	3
Artist	Album	Reached number one	Weeks at number one
Los Cantores de Bayamon	Puerto Rico Es Una Fiesta	14 January 2017	2
Gente de Zona	Visualizate	28 January 2017	1
Anibal de Gracia y Sus Invitados	Dejando Huellas	4 February 2017	1
Romeo Santos	Formula, Vol. 2	11 February 2017	5
Prince Royce	Five	18 March 2017	10
Romeo Santos	Formula, Vol. 2	27 May 2017	11
Romeo Santos	Golden	12 August 2017	37
Artist	Album	Reached number one	Weeks at number one
Víctor Manuelle	25/7	7 April 2018	1
Romeo Santos	Golden	14 April 2018	17
Aventura	Todavía Me Amas: Lo Mejor De Aventura	18 August 2018	35
Artist	Album	Reached number one	Weeks at number one
Romeo Santos	Utopia	20 April 2019	5
Marc Anthony	Opus	25 May 2019	2
Romeo Santos	Utopia	8 June 2019	4
Aventura	Todavía Me Amas: Lo Mejor De Aventura	6 July 2019	1
Romeo Santos	Utopia	13 July 2019	1
Aventura	Todavia Me Amas: Lo Mejor de Aventura	20 July 2019	2
Romeo Santos	Utopia	3 August 2019	1
Aventura	Todavía Me Amas: Lo Mejor De Aventura	10 August 2019	8
Romeo Santos	Utopia	5 October 2019	1
Aventura	Todavía Me Amas: Lo Mejor De Aventura	12 October 2019	12
