= Unplugged (Aventura album) =

Live album by Aventura
- Released: August 30, 2004 (Europe); January 11, 2011 (Live! 2002)
- Recorded: 2002; New York City, New York
- Venue: United Palace
- Genre: Bachata
- Label: Walbo

Aventura chronology
Love & Hate (2003)	Unplugged (2004)	God's Project (2005)

Unplugged is a 2004 live album by bachata group Aventura exclusively to Europe. This album is a re-release version of the album En Vivo (Live), which was released in 2002. In 2011 it was re-released as LIVE! 2002 which was available everywhere and has the same 8 live tracks and included a bonus track from the 9th Annual Latin Grammy Awards in which Aventura paid homage to José José with the song Lágrimas (Tears). Even though this performance happened in 2008, it was still added as a bonus track for the 2011 version of the live album.

== Track listing ==
En Vivo & Unplugged
No.	Title	Translation	Length
1.	"Cuando Volverás"	"When Will You Come Back"	5:03
2.	"No Lo Perdona Dios"	"God Won't Forgive Us"	6:09
3.	"9:15 (Nueve y Quince)"	"Nine Fifteen"	4:21
4.	"Amor De Madre"	"The Love of a Mother"	6:37
5.	"Enséñame A Olvidar"	"Show Me How To Forget"	6:34
6.	"Un Poeta Enamorado"	"A Poet In Love"	5:24
7.	"Mi Puerto Rico"	"My Puerto Rico"	2:32
8.	"Obsesión" (featuring Judy Santos)	"Obsession"	6:46
Total length:			43:26

Live! 2002 (Bonus Track)
No.	Title	Translation	Length
9.	"Lágrimas" (Homenaje A José José)	"Tears" (A Tribute To José José)	3:45
Total length:			47:11

== Charts ==
Chart (2004)	Peak position
Swiss Albums (Schweizer Hitparade)	55
