= List of Billboard Tropical Albums number ones from the 2020s =

The Billboard Tropical Albums chart, published in Billboard magazine, is a record chart that features Latin music sales information in regard to tropical music. The data is compiled by Nielsen SoundScan from a sample that includes music stores, music departments at electronics and department stores, Internet sales (both physical and digital) and verifiable sales from concert venues in the United States.

== Number-one albums ==
Artist	Album	Reached number one	Weeks at number one
Aventura	Todavía Me Amas: Lo Mejor De Aventura	4 January 2020	7
Prince Royce	Alter Ego	22 February 2020	1
Aventura	Todavía Me Amas: Lo Mejor De Aventura	29 February 2020	32 (98)
Romeo Santos	Formula, Vol. 2	10 October 2020	1
Aventura	Todavía Me Amas: Lo Mejor De Aventura	17 October 2020	4 (102)
Romeo Santos	Formula, Vol. 2	14 November 2020	1
Aventura	Todavía Me Amas: Lo Mejor De Aventura	21 November 2020	2 (104)
Romeo Santos	Formula, Vol. 2	5 December 2020	1
Aventura	Todavía Me Amas: Lo Mejor De Aventura	12 December 2020	2 (106)
Romeo Santos	Formula, Vol. 2	26 December 2020	1
Aventura	Todavía Me Amas: Lo Mejor De Aventura	2 January 2021	7 (113)
Romeo Santos	Formula, Vol. 2	20 February 2021	2
Aventura	Todavía Me Amas: Lo Mejor De Aventura	6 March 2021	5 (118)
Romeo Santos	Formula, Vol. 2	10 April 2021	1
Aventura	Todavía Me Amas: Lo Mejor De Aventura	17 April 2021	3 (121)
Romeo Santos	Formula, Vol. 2	8 May 2021	1
Aventura	Todavía Me Amas: Lo Mejor De Aventura	15 May 2021	2 (123)
Romeo Santos	Formula, Vol. 2	29 May 2021	1
Aventura	Todavía Me Amas: Lo Mejor De Aventura	5 June 2021	4 (127)
Romeo Santos	Formula, Vol. 2	3 July 2021	1
Aventura	Todavía Me Amas: Lo Mejor De Aventura	10 July 2021	5 (132)
Romeo Santos	Formula, Vol. 2	14 August 2021	1
Aventura	Todavía Me Amas: Lo Mejor De Aventura	21 August 2021	22 (154)
Romeo Santos	Formula, Vol. 2	22 January 2022	1
Aventura	Todavía Me Amas: Lo Mejor De Aventura	29 January 2022	3 (157)
Romeo Santos	Formula, Vol. 2	19 February 2022	4
Aventura	Todavía Me Amas: Lo Mejor De Aventura	19 March 2022	1 (158)
Romeo Santos	Formula, Vol. 2	26 March 2022	2
Aventura	Todavía Me Amas: Lo Mejor De Aventura	9 April 2022	3 (161)
Romeo Santos	Formula, Vol. 2	30 April 2022	1
Aventura	Todavía Me Amas: Lo Mejor De Aventura	7 May 2022	1 (162)
Romeo Santos	Formula, Vol. 2	14 May 2022	7
Aventura	Todavía Me Amas: Lo Mejor De Aventura	2 July 2022	4 (167)
Romeo Santos	Formula, Vol. 2	30 July 2022	1
Aventura	Todavía Me Amas: Lo Mejor De Aventura	6 August 2022	1 (168)
Romeo Santos	Formula, Vol. 2	13 August 2022	1
Aventura	Todavía Me Amas: Lo Mejor De Aventura	20 August 2022	1 (169)
Romeo Santos	Formula, Vol. 2	27 August 2022	1
Aventura	Todavía Me Amas: Lo Mejor De Aventura	3 September 2022	1 (170)
Romeo Santos	Formula, Vol. 2	10 September 2022	1
Romeo Santos	Formula, Vol. 3	17 September 2022	10
Aventura	Todavía Me Amas: Lo Mejor De Aventura	26 November 2022	4 (174)
Romeo Santos	Formula, Vol. 3	24 December 2022	4
Aventura	Todavía Me Amas: Lo Mejor De Aventura	21 January 2023	1 (175)
Romeo Santos	Formula, Vol. 3	28 January 2023	1
Aventura	Todavía Me Amas: Lo Mejor De Aventura	4 February 2023	4 (179)
Romeo Santos	Formula, Vol. 3	4 March 2023	1
Aventura	Todavía Me Amas: Lo Mejor De Aventura	11 March 2023	4 (183)
Romeo Santos	Formula, Vol. 2	8 April 2023	3
Aventura	Todavía Me Amas: Lo Mejor De Aventura	11 March 2023	2 (185)
Romeo Santos	Formula, Vol. 2	13 May 2023	3
Aventura	Todavía Me Amas: Lo Mejor De Aventura	3 June 2023	1 (186)
Romeo Santos	Formula, Vol. 2	10 June 2023	3
Aventura	Todavía Me Amas: Lo Mejor De Aventura	1 July 2023	3 (189)
Romeo Santos	Formula, Vol. 2	22 July 2023	3
Aventura	Todavía Me Amas: Lo Mejor De Aventura	12 August 2023	1 (190)
Romeo Santos	Formula, Vol. 2	19 August 2023	1
Aventura	Todavía Me Amas: Lo Mejor De Aventura	26 August 2023	3 (193)
Romeo Santos	Formula, Vol. 2	16 September 2023	2
Aventura	Todavía Me Amas: Lo Mejor De Aventura	30 September 2023	1 (194)
Romeo Santos	Formula, Vol. 2	7 October 2023	1
Aventura	Todavía Me Amas: Lo Mejor De Aventura	14 October 2023	1 (195)
Romeo Santos	Formula, Vol. 2	21 October 2023	3
Aventura	Todavía Me Amas: Lo Mejor De Aventura	11 November 2023	1 (196)
Romeo Santos	Formula, Vol. 2	18 November 2023	3
Aventura	Todavía Me Amas: Lo Mejor De Aventura	9 December 2023	1 (197)
Romeo Santos	Formula, Vol. 2	16 December 2023	4
Aventura	Todavía Me Amas: Lo Mejor De Aventura	13 January 2024	2 (199)
Romeo Santos	Formula, Vol. 2	27 January 2024	4
Aventura	Todavía Me Amas: Lo Mejor De Aventura	24 February 2024	2 (201)
Romeo Santos	Formula, Vol. 2	9 March 2024	1
Aventura	The Last	16 March 2024	1
Romeo Santos	Formula, Vol. 2	23 March 2024	3
Aventura	Todavía Me Amas: Lo Mejor De Aventura	13 April 2024	1 (202)
Romeo Santos	Formula, Vol. 2	20 April 2024	1
Aventura	Todavía Me Amas: Lo Mejor De Aventura	27 April 2024	2 (204)
Romeo Santos	Formula, Vol. 2	11 May 2024	3
Aventura	Todavía Me Amas: Lo Mejor De Aventura	1 June 2024	1 (205)
Romeo Santos	Formula, Vol. 2	8 June 2024	1
Aventura	Todavía Me Amas: Lo Mejor De Aventura	15 June 2024	1 (206)
Romeo Santos	Formula, Vol. 2	22 June 2024	3
Aventura	Todavía Me Amas: Lo Mejor De Aventura	15 June 2024	3 (209)
Romeo Santos	Formula, Vol. 2	3 August 2024	4
Aventura	Todavía Me Amas: Lo Mejor De Aventura	31 August 2024	1 (210)
Romeo Santos	Formula, Vol. 2	7 September 2024	4
Aventura	Todavía Me Amas: Lo Mejor De Aventura	5 October 2024	1 (211)
Romeo Santos	Formula, Vol. 2	12 October 2024	1
Aventura	Todavía Me Amas: Lo Mejor De Aventura	19 October 2024	1 (212)
Romeo Santos	Formula, Vol. 2	26 October 2024	5
Aventura	Todavía Me Amas: Lo Mejor De Aventura	30 November 2024	53 (265)
Romeo Santos	Formula, Vol. 2	6 December 2025	1
Romeo Santos and Prince Royce	Better Late Than Never	13 December 2025	2
Aventura	Todavía Me Amas: Lo Mejor De Aventura	27 December 2025	26 (291)
Romeo Santos	Formula, Vol. 2	27 June 2026	1
Aventura	Todavía Me Amas: Lo Mejor De Aventura	4 July 2026	21 (312)
