= 3rd Wish =

American rapper

- Origin: Orlando, Florida, United States
- Genres: R&B, hip hop, Latin hip hop
- Years active: 2004–2009
- Members: Justin Martin; Ricky Gonzales; Alex Acosta

3rd Wish was an American R&B all-male group. The group consisted of Ricky Gonzales (who is of Puerto Rican ancestry), Justin Martin and Alex Acosta (who is of Cuban ancestry). They have had a Top 10 hit with "Obsesión", and are known for their songs "I Am" and "Niña".

== Background ==
"Obsesión" was originally recorded and released by the Latin group Aventura, hitting #1 in France, Germany, Italy, the Netherlands and Belgium plus two weeks at the top of the Europe-wide chart and selling 1.5 million copies in the process.

3rd Wish discovered the track and together with Mintman and the US musician Baby Bash, re-recorded the track predominantly in English, which was musically performed and produced by Mintman. The song again reached the upper parts of European charts. It also reached #15 in the UK Singles Chart in December 2004.

== Discography ==
=== 2004 ===
- 3rd Wish Feat. Baby Bash - "Obsesión" (Si Es Amor)

=== 2005 ===
- 3rd Wish - "Niña"
- 3rd Wish - "I Am"

=== 2007 ===
- 3rd Wish - "It Doesn't Matter"
- 3rd Wish - "The One"
