= List of Billboard Latin Rhythm Airplay number ones of 2005 =

The Latin Rhythm Airplay chart was established on August 13, 2005, as a response to the growing popularity of reggaeton and other Latin urbano genres. The chart ranked the most-played songs on Latin rhythm radio stations.

Issue date	Song	Artist(s)	Ref.
August 13	"Lo Que Pasó, Pasó"	Daddy Yankee	
August 20	"Lo Que Pasó, Pasó"	Daddy Yankee	
August 27	"Lo Que Pasó, Pasó"	Daddy Yankee	
September 3	"Lo Que Pasó, Pasó"	Daddy Yankee	
September 10	"Lo Que Pasó, Pasó"	Daddy Yankee	
September 17	"Lo Que Pasó, Pasó"	Daddy Yankee	
September 24	"Lo Que Pasó, Pasó"	Daddy Yankee	
October 1	"Rakata"	Wisin & Yandel	
October 8	"Lo Que Pasó, Pasó"	Daddy Yankee	
October 15	"Rakata"	Wisin & Yandel	
October 22	"Rakata"	Wisin & Yandel	
October 29	"Ella y Yo"	Aventura featuring Don Omar	
November 5	"Rakata"	Wisin & Yandel	
November 12	"Ella y Yo"	Aventura featuring Don Omar	
November 19	"Rakata"	Wisin & Yandel	
November 26	"Rakata"	Wisin & Yandel	
December 3	"Rakata"	Wisin & Yandel	
December 10	"Rakata"	Wisin & Yandel	
December 17	"Rakata"	Wisin & Yandel	
December 24	"Ella y Yo"	Aventura featuring Don Omar	
December 31	"Rakata"	Wisin & Yandel	
