= Back to da Barrio =

Studio album by Michael Stuart
- Released: February 28, 2006
- Genre: Salsa
- Label: Machete Music

Michael Stuart chronology
| Sin Miedo (2004) | Back to da Barrio (2006) | Sentimiento de un Rumbero (2007) |

Singles from Back to da Barrio
- 1. "Ella y Yo" Released: 2006; 2. "Mayor Que Yo" Released: 2006; 3. "Paga Lo Que Debes" Released: 2006

Professional ratings
Review scores
| Source | Rating |
|---|---|
| Allmusic | 4.5/5 stars |

Back To Da Barrio is a salsa album by Michael Stuart which covers popular reggaeton songs in salsa. The album was nominated for Tropical Album of the Year by a Male Artist at the 2007 Latin Billboard Music Awards, losing to Víctor Manuelle's Decisión Unánime.

== Track listing ==
1. Mayor Que Yo [4:21]
2. Pobre Diabla [4:04]
3. No Soy Tu Marido [4:12]
4. Paga Lo Que Debes [4:39]
5. Ella y Yo (featuring Tito Rojas) [4:06]
6. Vengo Guapeando [4:31]
7. Ya Lo Se [4:53]
8. Soy Callejero [4:13]
9. Ven Bailalo [4:16]
10. Nadie Sabe [4:59]
11. Noche de Travesura [4:01]
12. Loco [4:43]

== Chart position ==
| Chart (2006) | Peak |
|---|---|
| Billboard Latin Tropical Albums | 3 |
| Billboard Top Heatseekers | 37 |
| Billboard Top Latin Albums | 30 |
| Billboard Top Tropical Albums | 3 |
