= Que Suenen los Tambores =

Studio album by Víctor Manuelle
- Released: April 21, 2015
- Genre: Salsa
- Length: 54:43
- Label: Kiyavi Corp.; Sony Music Latin
- Producer: Arbise "Motiff" Gonzalez

Víctor Manuelle chronology
| Me Llamaré Tuyo (2013) | Que Suenen los Tambores (2015) | 25/7 (2018) |

Singles from Que Suenen los Tambores
- 1. "Que Suenen los Tambores" Released: October 7, 2014; 2. "Agua Bendita" Released: February 24, 2015; 3. "Algo Le Pasa a Mi Héroe (Canción a Mi Papá)" Released: March 24, 2015; 4. "Agua Bendita (Versión Pop)" Released: May 4, 2015; 5. "No Quería Engañarte" Released: August 14, 2015

Que Suenen los Tambores (English: Let the Drums Sound) is the sixteenth studio album by Puerto Rican singer and songwriter Víctor Manuelle, released on April 21, 2015, through Kiyavi Corp. and Sony Music Latin. It was produced by Arbise "Motiff" Gonzalez, and features a collaboration with Puerto Rican singer Raquel Sofía in one of the bonus tracks.

At the 16th Annual Latin Grammy Awards, the album was nominated for Best Salsa Music while "Agua Bendita" was nominated for Best Tropical Song. The album was also nominated for Best Tropical Latin Album at the 58th Annual Grammy Awards and won Tropical Album of the Year at the 2016 Latin Billboard Music Awards.

The album peaked at numbers 167 and 2 on the Billboard 200 and Top Latin Albums chart, respectively, it also topped the Tropical Albums chart, being Manuelle's eleventh number-one album on the list. Additionally, the album was certified gold in the United States.

== Background ==
The album consists of thirteen tracks plus two pop versions of two songs from the album as bonus tracks, it includes songs written by Manuelle himself, like "Algo Le Pasa a Mi Héroe (Canción a Mi Papá)" ("Something Happens to My Hero (Song to My Father)"), dedicated to his father who was diagnosed with Alzheimer's disease in 2006, as well as songs written by other composers like the title track, written by Osmany Ernesto Espinosa Morales and first released by Cuban singer Laritza Bacallao. Mainly a salsa album, it also incorporates sounds from urban music and vallenato, Manuelle said that with the album he wanted to "renovate a little the style of my salsa" to appeal to younger audiences, he also said that "the result was incredible, very energetic, without losing the essence of what salsa is".

== Singles ==
The album spawned four singles, the title track was released as the first single on October 7, 2014, followed by "Agua Bendita" on February 24, 2015, and "Algo Le Pasa a Mi Héroe (Canción a Mi Papá)" on March 24, 2015, the two bonus tracks were later released as the fourth and fifth singles, "Agua Bendita (Versión Pop)" on May 4, 2015, and "No Quería Engañarte" on August 14, 2015. The first single "Que Suenen los Tambores" peaked at number 11 at the Hot Latin Songs chart, while "Agua Bendita" and "No Quería Engañarte" peaked at numbers 26 and 23, respectively. Additionally, "Que Suenen los Tambores", "Agua Bendita" and "No Quería Engañarte" topped the Tropical Airplay chart.

== Critical reception ==
Professional ratings
Review scores
| Source | Rating |
|---|---|
| AllMusic | 4/5 stars |

Thom Jurek from AllMusic gave the album four out of five stars, he wrote that "when taken together, all 13 tracks on Que Suenen los Tambores offer an ambitious, dizzying statement that combines everything the singer does best with wide-ranging ambition as he experiments with many rhythmic styles", he finished the review calling the album "one of the sharpest and most focused records of his career".

== Track listing ==
Que Suenen los Tambores track listing
| No. | Title | Writer(s) | Length |
|---|---|---|---|
| 1. | "Agua Bendita" | Víctor Manuel Ruiz; Andrés Castro | 4:00 |
| 2. | "No Quería Engañarte" | Wilfran Castillo | 4:32 |
| 3. | "Sal a Bailar" | Ruiz; Juan José Hernández | 4:05 |
| 4. | "La Foto que Faltó" | Ruiz; Jorge Luis Piloto | 4:10 |
| 5. | "Si Tú Te Dejas Querer" | José "Gocho" Torres | 4:01 |
| 6. | "Cuando Ya No Me Acuerde de Ti" | Erika Ender; Daniel Santacruz | 3:57 |
| 7. | "Peado Perfecto" | Hernández; Santacruz | 4:09 |
| 8. | "Isabela" | Juan Pablo Díaz | 4:49 |
| 9. | "La Vida Perfecta" | Castillo | 3:35 |
| 10. | "Porque Te Llaman Amor" | Ruiz; Santacruz | 4:36 |
| 11. | "Que Suenen los Tambores - Pa'l Mundo" | Osmany Ernesto Espinosa Morales | 3:29 |
| 12. | "Algo Le Pasa a Mi Héroe (Canción a Mi Papá)" | Ruiz | 4:38 |
| 13. | "Que Suenen los Tambores" | Espinosa Morales | 4:16 |
| Total length: | | | 54:43 |

Que Suenen los Tambores bonus tracks
| No. | Title | Writer(s) | Length |
|---|---|---|---|
| 14. | "Agua Bendita - Versión Pop" | Ruiz; Castro | 3:25 |
| 15. | "No Quería Engañarte - Versión Balada Pop" (featuring Raquel Sofía) | Castillo | 4:14 |
| Total length: | | | 62:22 |

== Credits ==
=== Musicians ===
- Victor Manuelle – main vocals, composer (track 1, 3, 4, 10, 12, 14), executive producer
- Raquel Sofía – featured artist (track 15)
- Andrés Castro – composer (tracks 1, 14), arrangements
- Wilfran Castillo – composer (tracks 2, 9, 15)
- Juan José Hernández – composer (tracks 3, 7)
- Jorge Luis Piloto – composer (track 4)
- José "Gocho" Torres – composer (track 5)
- Erika Ender – composer (track 6)
- Daniel Santacruz – composer (tracks 6, 7, 10)
- Juan Pablo Díaz – composer (track 8)
- Osmany Ernesto Espinosa Morales – composer (tracks 11, 13)
- Arbise "Motiff" Gonzalez – producer, arrangements
- Efrain "Junito" Davila – arrangements, piano
- Harry Aponte – arrangements, keyboards, piano
- Carlos García – arrangements
- James Hernánez – arrangements
- Jay Lugo – arrangements
- Frank A. Suárez – arrangements
- Jesús Alonso – trumpet
- Jan Duclerc – trumpet
- Ángel Machado – trumpet
- Jose Ruiz – trumpet
- Eliud Cintron – trombone
- Jorge Díaz Ortiz – trombone
- Antonio "Toñito" Vázquez – trombone
- Carmelo Alvarez – bongos
- Diego Centeno – batucada
- Joseph Correa – batucada
- Wilfredo Dávila – batucada
- José Maysonet – batucada
- Felix Pizarro – batucada
- José Santiago – batucada
- Carlitos García – piano
- Samuel García – congas, hand percussion
- Jorge Laboy – acoustic guitar
- Richard "Jay" López – violin
- Juan L. Picorelli – timbales
- Raúl Rosario – timbales
- Ricardo Porrata – backing vocals
- Michelle Sotomayor – backing vocals
- Norberto Vélez – backing vocals
- Samuel Vélez – sax
- Israel Vélez-Panderos – guiro

=== Technical ===
- Mike Fuller – mastering
- Rolando Alejandro – recording engineering
- David LaPointe – marketing

== Charts ==
Weekly chart performance for Que Suenen los Tambores
| Chart (2015) | Peak position |
|---|---|
| US Billboard 200 | 167 |
| US Top Latin Albums (Billboard) | 2 |
| US Tropical Albums (Billboard) | 1 |

== Certifications ==
| Region | Certification | Certified units/sales |
|---|---|---|
| United States (RIAA) | Gold (Latin) | 30,000^{‡} |
^{‡} Sales+streaming figures based on certification alone.
