= God's Project =

Studio album by Aventura
- Released: April 26, 2005 (U.S.)
- Recorded: 2004–05
- Studios: Boondog Studio (New York City), Cutting Studios (New York City), Skylight Studios (New York City)
- Genres: Bachata; pop; R&B; hip-hop; merengue; reggaetón
- Length: 1:07:40
- Labels: Premium Latin Music; Sony International

Aventura chronology
Unplugged (2004)	God's Project (2005)	K.O.B. Live (2006)

Singles from God's Project
- 1. "La Boda" Released: February 7, 2005; 2. "Ella y Yo" Released: May 9, 2005; 3. "Un Beso" Released: August 8, 2005; 4. "Angelito" Released: November 21, 2005

God's Project is the fourth studio album released by bachata group Aventura. It was released on April 26, 2005, by Premium Latin Music and distributed by Sony Music Latin. The album production was based on bachata with elements of rock, merengue and urban music such as R&B, exploring new sounds with reggaeton with an urban hip-hop Black American flavor. This combination of rhythms was classified by some critics as "neo-bachata". It features guest appearances by Judy Santos, Anthony Santos, Nina Sky and reggaeton artists Tego Calderon and Don Omar.

The title of the album made reference that it was God's idea that each member of the band ended up doing music together. On the intro track, appeared the mothers of each member explain and made stories about their initials on music when they were children. The album contains sixteen tracks, including one intro, two skits, and one hidden track. It explored lyrics of romance, sex, love, cheating, and infidelity. Like their previous albums, it contains social conscience lyrics on songs like "La Niña". The album cover features Romeo, Henry, Lenny, and Max from left to right when they were infants.

God's Project received positive reviews by critics and was praised for the band's skills as musicians and their improvement in production. It won Album of the Year at 2006's Soberano Awards, previously known as the Casandra Awards. Following the success of the album, the band won two awards at Premio Lo Nuestro 2006 for Best Tropical Duo or Group and Traditional. Also, it won Tropical Album of the Year and Song of the Year by a Duo or Group at the 2006 Billboard Latin Music Awards. The album was supported by the release of four official singles: "La Boda", "Ella y Yo", "Un Beso", and "Angelito".

God's Project is considered Aventura's mainstream breakthrough album. It remained the top-selling album on the chart for 7 consecutive weeks in 2005 and 5 non-consecutive weeks in 2006 on the Billboard Tropical Albums chart. It debuted in the top 5 of the Billboard Top Latin Albums chart and was certified four times platinum (Latin field) in the United States by the Recording Industry Association of America (RIAA). Two of the four album singles reached the top 10 on the US Hot Latin Songs chart. Eventually, it was the best-selling tropical album of 2006 in the United States. The album peaked in the top 40 charts of France and Italy and in the top 20 in Ecuador. In Switzerland, it was certified gold. Eventually, it sold over half a million of copies worldwide. To promote the album, Aventura embarked on a highly successful tour selling out venues like New York's Madison Square Garden, Altos de Chavon and Coliseo de Puerto Rico.

== Background and promotion ==
God's Project was the band's first album to be distributed by Sony Latin Music. With the new Sony distribution, expectations were high. According to the band's manager Johnny Marines, citing presence in mass-merchant accounts and on internet sites, explained "When you add them all up, they add up to something big" and "Sony has opened the doors for many forms of promotion we didn't have in the past".

== Singles ==
"La Boda" was the first single from the album. It was released in February 2005 and peaked at number 2 on the Billboard Tropical Airplay chart.

"Ella y Yo" was the second single. It was released on May 9, 2005, and featured Puerto Rican reggaeton artist Don Omar. It peaked at No. 97 on the Billboard Hot 100, number 2 on the Hot Latin Songs chart and at number one on both the Latin Rhythm and Tropical Airplay charts. The music video was released the same year. Shot in a bar, the video is about Romeo Santos and Don Omar having a conversation about love.

"Un Beso" was the third single, released on August 8, 2005. The group paid tribute to Spanish musician Manzanita in the song. It peaked at number 6 on the Hot Latin Songs chart and at number 2 on the Tropical Airplay chart.

"Angelito" was the fourth and final single from the album, released in late 2005. It peaked at No. 17 on the Billboard Tropical Airplay chart. This would also be the last song to feature Judy Santos before embarking on her own music career.

== Reception ==
=== Critical response ===
Professional ratings
Review scores
Source	Rating
AllMusic	4/5 stars

The album received positive reviews by critics. Evan C. Gutierrez from AllMusic gave four out five stars and praised the album's production and innovation. About the musical skills of some of the members of the band, the writer explained "Under the clever guise of a boy band lurks some genuine musicianship, particularly evident in Lenny and Mikey Santos. The musician's ear will delight in Lenny's skillful guitar playing and tasteful, hip production, which foreshadow a long, fruitful career in the industry". However, the writer critics the albums's stylistically homogeneous and lack of instrumentation. However, he explained that "it is exactly their dedication to their Dominican heritage and an original sound that has saved them from pop mediocrity" and named God's Project as "the most consistent in quality so far and perhaps their strongest release period, establishes them as more than a pop phenomenon."

=== Commercial performance ===
Pre-orders of the album were over 125,000 before its release date. In the United States, God's Project debuted at number three on the Billboard Tropical Albums chart on the week of May 14, 2005 selling over 7,600 copies. The next week it peaked at number one on the chart and remained there for seven consecutive weeks. Also, it peaked at number five on the Billboard Top Latin Albums chart and at No. 133 the Billboard 200. It was the best selling tropical album of 2006 in the United States. As of 2009, it sold 316,000 copies. Eventually, it was certified four times platinum (Latin field) by the RIAA for shipping 400,000 copies in the United States. In Switzerland, the album peaked at number two and was certified gold for shipping 20,000 copies. Also, it peaked on number 20 on the French albums chart and 32 on the Italian albums chart. It peaked at number 18 on the Ecuador album retail charts. God's Project has sold more than half a million copies worldwide.

== Track listing ==
No.	Title	Translation	Length
1.	"Intro"		1:24
2.	"Angelito" (featuring Judy Santos)	"Little Angel"	4:53
3.	"La Boda"	"The Wedding"	4:49
4.	"Un Chi Chi"	"A Baby"	3:59
5.	"Volvió La Traicionera"	"The Traitor Returned"	3:23
6.	"La Niña"	"The Girl"	4:53
7.	"Our Song"		4:24
8.	"Bar Skit"		0:49
9.	"Ella & Yo" (featuring Don Omar)	"She and I"	4:27
10.	"Un Beso"	"A Kiss"	4:23
11.	"Voy Malacostumbrado"	"I'm Unaccustomed"	4:33
12.	"Ciego De Amor" (featuring Anthony Santos)	"Blinded by Love"	5:07
13.	"Audition Skit"		6:47
14.	"Por Tu Orgullo"	"Because of Your Pride"	4:19
15.	"You're Lying" (featuring Nina Sky)		4:24
Total length:			1:03:35

Hidden track
No.	Title	Translation	Length
16.	"We Got the Crown" ("Envidia")" (Remix) (featuring Tego Calderón)	"Envy"	4:05
Total length:			1:07:40

- In the original version of the album, the remix of the song "We Got the Crown (Remix)" is a hidden track inside the song "You're Lying". The original version of the song was from Tego Calderon's compilation album El Enemy De Los Guasibiri which also featured Aventura.

== Charts ==
=== Weekly charts ===
Chart (2005)	Peak position
French Albums (SNEP)	20
Ecuadorian Albums (Musicalisimo)	18
Italian Albums (FIMI)	32
Swiss Albums (Schweizer Hitparade)	2
US Billboard 200	133
US Heatseekers Albums (Billboard)	5
US Top Current Album Sales (Billboard)	133
US Top Latin Albums (Billboard)	5
US Tropical Albums (Billboard)	1

=== Year-end charts ===
Chart (2005)	Position
Swiss Albums (Schweizer Hitparade)	41
US Top Latin Albums (Billboard)	23
Chart (2006)	Position
US Top Latin Albums (Billboard)	18
US Tropical Albums (Billboard)	1
Chart (2022)	Position
US Top Latin Albums (Billboard)	65
US Tropical Albums (Billboard)	15

== Sales and certifications ==
Region	Certification	Certified units/sales
Switzerland (IFPI Switzerland)	Gold	20,000^{^}
United States (RIAA)	4× Platinum (Latin)	400,000^{^}
^{^} Shipments figures based on certification alone.

== See also ==
- List of number-one Billboard Tropical Albums from the 2000s
