= Llorar (Aventura song) =

- Promotional CD of the single

Single by Aventura

from the album Love & Hate
- Released: 2004
- Recorded: 2003
- Genre: Bachata
- Length: 4:07
- Label: Premium Latin Music
- Songwriter: Anthony "Romeo" Santos

Aventura singles chronology
"Hermanita" (2003)	"Llorar" (2004)	"Angelito" (2005)

Music video
- "Hermanita" on YouTube

"Llorar" (Crying) is a song recorded by bachata group Aventura. It served as the group's second single from their third studio album Love & Hate. It peaked at number 8 on the Billboard Tropical Airplay chart.

== Charts ==
Chart (2004)	Peak position
US Tropical Airplay (Billboard)	8
