= El Perdedor (Aventura song) =

- Promotional CD of the single

Single by Aventura

from the album K.O.B. Live
- Released: October 29, 2007
- Recorded: 2006
- Genre: Tropical · Bachata
- Length: 3:35
- Label: Premium Latin Music
- Songwriter: Anthony "Romeo" Santos
- Producers: Lenny Santos, Anthony Santos, Henry Santos Jeter

Aventura singles chronology
"Mi Corazoncito" (2007)	"El Perdedor" (2007)	"Por un Segundo" (2008)

Music video
- "El Perdedor" on YouTube

"El Perdedor" (English: The Loser) is Aventura's third single from album K.O.B. Live (2006). The song reached big recognition in many Spanish-speaking countries. and reached the top five of the Billboard Hot Latin Tracks. A remix was made for the song featuring Ken-Y.

== Music video ==
The music video for "El Perdedor" is about a man who is too focused on his work and career and thus ignores pretty much ignores his lover. She is trying to make some time for them but he always puts work on top of her. Eventually, after many times of being disappointed, another man gains her attention as he is interested in her and shows it by devoting time to her.

== Charts ==
=== Weekly charts ===
Chart (2008)	Peak position
Nicaragua (EFE)	3
US Hot Latin Songs (Billboard)	5
US Latin Pop Airplay (Billboard)	7
US Latin Rhythm Airplay (Billboard)	1
US Tropical Airplay (Billboard)	1

Chart (2010)	Peak Position
US Tropical Digital Songs (Billboard)	11

=== Year-end charts ===
Chart (2008)	Position
US Hot Latin Songs (Billboard)	34

== Awards ==
The song was awarded Tropical Airplay Song Of The Year by a Duo Or Group and Latin Rhythm Airplay Song Of The Year by a Duo Or Group in the 2009 Latin Billboard Music Awards. It was also awarded the Lo Nuestro Award for Tropical Song of the Year in 2009.

== See also ==
- List of number-one Billboard Hot Tropical Songs of 2008
- List of Billboard Latin Rhythm Airplay number ones of 2008
