= Judy Santos =

American singer

- Born: June 17, 1981 (age 45); Sleepy Hollow, New York, U.S.
- Genres: Bachata, merengue
- Occupations: Singer, songwriter
- Instruments: Voice, piano
- Years active: 2001–present
- Formerly of: Aventura

Judy Santos (born in Sleepy Hollow, New York on June 17, 1981) is an American singer, known for her collaboration with the bachata band Aventura and for her own solo career. The 2002 song "Obsesión", in which she sang a duet with Aventura vocalist Romeo Santos (no relation), topped the charts in several countries. She has also a solo career in which one of her single, "No Me Rendiré", reached #24 on Billboard Tropical Airplay chart in 2021.

== Career ==
=== Aventura (2001-2005, 2021) ===
Santos began her career as a singer participating in various children music groups. Her big break came in 2002 when she contributed her voice alongside Romeo Santos in the single "Obsesión", from the album We Broke the Rules by bachata band Aventura. The song was a huge hit in several territories, topping the charts in countries such as Austria, Belgium, France, Germany, Italy and Switzerland.

Her collaboration with Aventura continued in the album Love & Hate, in which she contributed her voice in the song "La guerra". In 2005 she again appeared alongside Romeo Santos in the song "Angelito", which peaked at number 17 on the Billboard Tropical Airplay chart.

On October 9, 2021, Santos reunited with the group at MetLife Stadium to sing their smash hit song, Obsesión.

=== Solo career (2006-present) ===
After finishing her collaboration with Aventura and appearing as a guest artist in the songs "Yo quiero saber" and "Tú y yo" by Toby Love, Santos began a solo career in the mid-2010s. Her first single, titled "Tú tienes tu vida" and released in 2015, made an impact on Billboard's tropical music chart. A year later she recorded a new collaboration with Toby Love in the song "No hay colores", which was among the most outstanding Latin songs in Canada.

After releasing the singles "Secreto", "Loca" and "Demos paso al amor" and the live album Judy Santos Live, recorded during a virtual performance during the COVID-19 pandemic quarantine, Santos collaborated with Wilmore "Bimbo" Franco on the song "All By Myself", which was included in the album Classic American Tunes in Bachata (2020). The singer released the single "No me rendiré", which reached number 24 on Billboard Tropical Airplay chart in 2021. The song was produced and co-written by Grammy Award winner Chris Hierro.

== Discography ==
=== Aventura ===
Year	Title	Album
2002	"Obsesión"	We Broke the Rules
2003	"La Guerra"	Love & Hate
2005	"Angelito"	God's Project

=== Solo ===
==== Albums ====
Year	Title
2020	Live

==== Singles ====
Year	Title	Featuring
2015	"Tú Tienes Tu Vida"	
2016	"No Hay Colores"	Toby Love
2017	"Secreto"	
2020	"Demos Paso Al Amor"	
2020	"Loca"	
2020	"All By Myself"	Wilmore Bimbo Franco
2021	"No Me Rendiré"	
