= Hermanita =

Single by Aventura

from the album Love & Hate
- Released: 2003
- Recorded: 2003
- Genre: Tropical
- Length: 4:35
- Label: Premium Latin Music
- Songwriter: Anthony "Romeo" Santos
- Producers: Lenny Santos, Anthony Santos, Henry Santos Jeter

Aventura singles chronology
"Obsesión" (2002)	"Hermanita" (2003)	"Llorar" (2004)

Music video
- "Hermanita" on YouTube

"Hermanita" (Little Sister) is a song recorded by bachata group Aventura. It served as the group's main single from their third studio album Love & Hate. The song reached big recognition in many Spanish-speaking countries and reached number 33 on the Billboard Hot Latin Songs chart while peaking at number three on the Billboard Tropical Songs chart. It also peaked at number twelve in Switzerland and remained charted for twenty-four weeks. This is Aventura's second real-life situation song.

== Music video ==
The music video for "Hermanita" is about Romeo's older sister whose husband abuses her physically and emotionally and "Romeo" shows up to help her after she calls him. She ends up murdering her husband with the gun her brother gave her (Romeo).

== Charts ==
=== Weekly charts ===
Chart (2004)	Peak position
Italy (FIMI)	25
Switzerland (Schweizer Hitparade)	12
US Hot Latin Songs (Billboard)	33
US Tropical Airplay (Billboard)	3

=== Year-end charts ===
Chart (2004)	Position
Switzerland (Schweizer Hitparade)	48
US Tropical Songs (Billboard)	9
