= Ella y Yo =

Song by Aventura and Don Omar

Single by Aventura featuring Don Omar

from the album God's Project and Da Hitman Presents Reggaetón Latino
- Released: May 9, 2005
- Recorded: 2005
- Genre: Reggaeton; bachata
- Length: 4:27
- Label: Premium Latin
- Songwriters: Anthony Santos; William Landrón
- Producers: Lenny Santos; Anthony Santos; Henry Santos Jeter; Max Santos; Don Omar

Aventura singles chronology
"La Boda" (2005)	"Ella y Yo" (2005)	"Un Beso" (2005)

Don Omar singles chronology
"Reggaeton Latino" (2005)	"Ella y Yo" (2005)	"Anda Sola" (2006)

Music video
- "Ella & Yo" on YouTube

"Ella y Yo" (English: "Her and I") is Aventura's second single from their 2004 fourth studio album God's Project and features reggaeton singer Don Omar. The song is also in Don Omar's 2005 compilation album, Da Hitman Presents Reggaetón Latino.

== Music video ==
In the "Ella y Yo" music video, Romeo Santos and Don Omar are having drinks in a bar. Omar is telling Santos about a woman he has been seeing that is cheating on her husband and how bad he feels. Meanwhile, Santos is saying how he and his wife have a perfect relationship, and that Omar should continue to fight for this woman because her husband does not rule her heart. Omar then admits the woman he has been seeing is Santos' wife, making Santos sad and perplexed, going away and saying they both betrayed him.

== Track listings ==
CD single

1. "Ella Y Yo"
2. "Ella Y Yo" (Mexican Radio Mix)

== Chart performance ==
Chart (2005)	Peak Position
US Billboard Hot 100	97
US Hot Latin Songs (Billboard)	2
US Latin Pop Airplay (Billboard)	32
US Latin Rhythm Airplay (Billboard)	1
US Tropical Airplay (Billboard)	1
Chart (2013)	Peak Position
US Tropical Digital Songs (Billboard)	3
Chart (2022)	Peak Position
US Latin Digital Song Sales (Billboard)	12

=== All-time charts ===
Chart (2021)	Position
US Hot Latin Songs (Billboard)	45

== Awards ==
In the 2006 Latin Billboard Music Awards, the song was nominated for Hot Latin Song of the Year by Vocal Duet or Collaboration, losing to "La Tortura" by Shakira and Alejandro Sanz. Nonetheless, it was awarded for Tropical Airplay Song of the Year by a Duo or Group.

== Michael Stuart version ==
"Ella y Yo"

Single by Michael Stuart featuring Tito Rojas

from the album Back to da Barrio
- Released: 2006
- Recorded: 2006
- Genre: Salsa
- Length: 4:09
- Songwriters: Anthony "Romeo" Santos; Don Omar

Michael Stuart singles chronology
"Te Gusta Verme Sufrir" (2004)	"Ella y Yo" (2006)	"Mayor Que Yo" (2006)

Tito Rojas singles chronology
"Si Me Pusieran a Elegir" (2006)	"Ella y Yo" (2006)	"Antes de Que te Vayas" (2007)

"Ella y Yo" was covered by Michael Stuart on his 2006 album, Back to da Barrio, and features fellow Puerto Rican salsa singer Tito Rojas.

=== Chart performance ===
Chart (2006)	Peak Position
US Tropical Airplay (Billboard)	15

== See also ==
- List of Billboard Latin Rhythm Airplay number ones of 2005
