= La Boda (song) =

Single by Aventura

from the album God's Project
- Language: Spanish
- English title: "The Wedding"
- Released: February 2005
- Recorded: 2005
- Genre: Bachata
- Length: 4:23
- Label: Premium Latin Music
- Songwriter: Anthony "Romeo" Santos
- Producers: Lenny Santos, Anthony "Romeo" Santos, Henry Santos Jeter, Max Santos

Aventura singles chronology
"Llorar" (2004)	"La Boda" (2005)	"Ella y Yo" (2005)

Music video
- "La Boda" on YouTube

"La Boda" (The Wedding) is a song by Bachata group Aventura. It's their first single from their fourth studio album God's Project.

== Music video ==
The Music video for "La Boda" starts out with Romeo and Lenny watching the news when it shows that Anthony's ex-girlfriend is getting married. They leave and invade the wedding and it shows flashbacks of Anthony and his ex's relationship.

== Charts ==
Chart (2004)	Peak Position
US Tropical Airplay (Billboard)	2
