= Los Infieles =

Single by Aventura

from the album K.O.B. Live
- Released: July 3, 2006
- Recorded: 2006
- Genre: Bachata
- Length: 4:17
- Label: Premium Latin Music
- Songwriter(s): Anthony "Romeo" Santos · Nely · Efrain Masis Marcos & unknown writer
- Producer(s): Lenny Santos · Anthony Santos · Henry Santos Jeter

Aventura singles chronology
"Noche de Sexo" (2005)	"Los Infieles" (2006)	"Mi Corazoncito" (2007)

Music video
- "Los Infieles" on YouTube

"Los Infieles" (English: The Unfaithful) is a song by Aventura. It is the first single from their second live album, K.O.B. Live (2006). The song reached the top five of the Billboard Hot Latin Tracks by peaking at #4. There is also a remix for the song featuring Mexican singer Frankie J.

== Music video ==
The music video for "Los Infieles" is Aventura in a club when they each meet four attractive women. They all have girlfriends, and the girls have boyfriends, but that doesn't stop them from hooking up. The girl Romeo is with gets a phone call at 2:30 in the morning from her boyfriend asking where is she at. She tells him she's running late.

== Charts ==
=== Weekly charts ===
Chart (2006–2007)	Peak position
US Hot Latin Songs (Billboard)	4
US Latin Rhythm Airplay (Billboard)	5
US Tropical Airplay (Billboard)	1

=== Year-end charts ===
Chart (2006)	Position
US Hot Latin Songs (Billboard)	42

== Awards and nominations ==
"Los Infieles" received an award at the 2007 Latin Billboard Music Awards for "Tropical Airplay Song of the Year" by Duo or Group. The song also received a nomination at the Premio Lo Nuestro 2008 for "Tropical Song of the Year" which it lost to their own song, "Mi Corazoncito".
