= Un Beso =

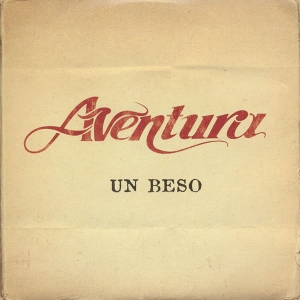

Single by Aventura

from the album God's Project
- Released: August 8, 2005
- Recorded: 2005
- Genre: Bachata
- Length: 4:23
- Label: Premium Latin Music
- Songwriter: Anthony "Romeo" Santos
- Producers: Lenny Santos, Anthony Santos, Henry Santos Jeter, Max Santos

Aventura singles chronology
"Ella y Yo" (2005)	"Un Beso" (2005)	"Angelito" (2005)

Music video
- "Un Beso" on YouTube

"Un Beso" (A Kiss) is Aventura's third single from their fourth studio album, God's Project. The song received airplay in Spanish-speaking countries, reaching number 6 on the Billboard Hot Latin Songs chart and number 35 on the Billboard Regional Mexican Airplay chart. It was later included on the compilation album Bachata Romántica: 1's (2009).

== Music video ==
The music video for "Un Beso" shows Romeo sitting down in a club when he sees this girl dancing. He walks up to her, and then they start dancing, and then they share a kiss. They fall in love after the kiss, and leave the club to go on a cruise then they share another kiss.

== Charts ==
=== Weekly charts ===
Chart (2005–2006)	Peak position
Switzerland (Schweizer Hitparade)	37
US Hot Latin Songs (Billboard)	6
US Regional Mexican Airplay (Billboard)	35
US Tropical Airplay (Billboard)	2

=== Year-end charts ===
Chart (2006)	Position
US Hot Latin Songs (Billboard)	9
