= Angelito (Aventura song) =

Single by Aventura featuring Judy Santos

from the album God's Project
- Language: Spanish
- English title: "Little Angel"
- Released: November 21, 2005
- Recorded: 2004
- Genre: Bachata
- Length: 4:53
- Label: Premium Latin Music
- Songwriter: Anthony "Romeo" Santos
- Producers: Lenny Santos, Romeo Santos, Henry Santos Jeter, Max Santos

Aventura singles chronology
"Un Beso" (2005)	"Angelito" (2005)	"Noche de Sexo" (2006)

"Angelito" (Little Angel) is a song by Bachata group Aventura which features Judy Santos. It is the fourth single from their fourth studio album God's Project. This was also the last song Judy Santos was featured in with the group as she would embark in her own music career later on.

== Track listings ==
CD single

1. "Angelito" (Radio Edit) - 3:36

CD maxi

1. "Angelito" (Radio Mix) - 3:31
2. "Angelito" (Dance Radio Mix) - 3:43
3. "Angelito" (Album Version) - 4:55
4. "Angelito" (Extended Dance Mix) - 4:41

== Charts ==
Chart (2005)	Peak Position
Italy (FIMI)	24
US Tropical Airplay (Billboard)	17
