= Obsesión (Aventura song) =

Single by Aventura

Single by Aventura

from the album We Broke the Rules
- B-side: "Todavía me amas"; "Cuándo volverás"
- Released: 2002
- Genre: Bachata
- Length: 4:12
- Label: Premium Latin
- Songwriter: Anthony Santos
- Producer: Franklin Romero

Aventura singles chronology
"Cuando Volverás" (1999)	"Obsesión" (2002)	"Hermanita" (2003)

Music video
- "Obsesión" on YouTube; "Obsesión" (short version) on YouTube

"Obsesión" (English: "Obsession") is a song by Dominican-American bachata band Aventura with Judy Santos as the female vocalist. It was included on their second studio album, We Broke the Rules (2002), and an English-language version was made for the same album. The song achieved success in many countries, topping many international charts. In France, the song held the number-one slot on the French Singles Chart for seven weeks, and as of August 2014, it is the 19th-best-selling single of the 21st century in France, with 565,000 units sold. "Obsesión" sold two million copies in Europe alone.

In 2004, the song was covered by 3rd Wish featuring Baby Bash and production from Mintman on their album Reflections of the South. This version became a top-10 hit in Austria, Germany, and Switzerland. Later, in 2005, Mexican-American singer Frankie J made an English and more soul-styled version of the song, also featuring Baby Bash, called "Obsession (No Es Amor)" for his album The One. This version was successful in the United States, Australia, and New Zealand, reaching the top five in all three countries.

== Content ==
The lyrics for "Obsesión" were written by Aventura vocalist Romeo Santos, and the refrain is performed by the female singer Judy Santos (no relation). The lyrics of the song speak about a man who likes a woman. However, it soon becomes clear that this feeling is "not love", but an obsession.

== Track listings ==
European CD single

1. "Obsesión" (radio mix) – 3:49
2. "Obsesión" (dance remix) – 5:39

European and German maxi-CD single

1. "Obsesión" (radio mix) – 3:49
2. "Obsesión" (dance remix) – 5:39
3. "Obsesión" (dance radio edit) – 3:52
4. "Obsesión" (English remix) – 4:10
5. "Todavía me amas" – 4:43

French CD single

1. "Obsesión" (radio edit) – 3:08
2. "Obsesión" (Life Saver remix) – 3:21

French 12-inch single

A1. "Obsesión" (original edit) – 3:08
A2. "Obsesión" (Life Saver orchestra remix) – 4:50
A3. "Obsesión" (club mix) – 4:28
B1. "Obsesión" (Smooth remix) – 4:11
B2. "Obsesión" (house remix) – 3:25

Italian CD single

1. "Obsesión" (radio mix) – 3:49
2. "Obsesión" (dance remix) – 5:39
3. "Obsesión" (original album version) – 4:13
4. "Obsesión" (dance radio edit) – 3:52

Spanish CD single

1. "Obsesión" – 4:10
2. "Obsesión" (dance remix) – 5:39
3. "Obsesión" (Rose Rouge Techno) – 5:45
4. "Obsesión" (Latin Lovers) – 5:32

Dutch CD single

1. "Obsesión" – 4:12
2. "Cuándo volverás" – 3:31

Dutch CD single (remix)

1. "Obsesión" (dance remix) – 5:39
2. "Obsesión" (dance radio edit) – 3:52

== Charts ==
=== Weekly charts ===
Chart (2002–2005)	Peak position
Austria (Ö3 Austria Top 40)	1
Belgium (Ultratop 50 Flanders)	1
Belgium (Ultratop 50 Wallonia)	2
CIS Airplay (TopHit)	4
CIS Airplay (TopHit) Reggaeton mix	164
Czech Republic (IFPI)	20
Europe (Eurochart Hot 100)	1
France (SNEP)	1
Germany (GfK)	1
Hungary (Dance Top 40)	11
Hungary (Rádiós Top 40)	4
Italy (FIMI)	1
Netherlands (Dutch Top 40)	6
Netherlands (Single Top 100)	4
Romania (Romanian Top 100)	2
Russia Airplay (TopHit)	2
Russia Airplay (TopHit) Reggaeton mix	158
Spain (Promusicae)	4
Sweden (Sverigetopplistan)	12
Switzerland (Schweizer Hitparade)	1
Ukraine Airplay (TopHit)	128
Ukraine Airplay (TopHit) Reggaeton mix	117
US Tropical Airplay (Billboard)	32

Chart (2011)	Peak position
US Latin Digital Song Sales (Billboard)	47

Chart (2024)	Peak position
Argentina Hot 100 (Billboard)	74

=== Year-end charts ===
Chart (2003)	Position
Italy (FIMI)	2
Netherlands (Single Top 100)	87

Chart (2004)	Position
Austria (Ö3 Austria Top 40)	9
Belgium (Ultratop 50 Flanders)	2
Belgium (Ultratop 50 Wallonia)	4
CIS Airplay (TopHit)	18
Europe (Eurochart Hot 100)	3
France (SNEP)	3
Germany (Media Control GfK)	8
Italy (FIMI)	20
Netherlands (Dutch Top 40)	49
Netherlands (Single Top 100)	23
Russia Airplay (TopHit)	8
Sweden (Hitlistan)	44
Switzerland (Schweizer Hitparade)	10

Chart (2005)	Position
Hungary (Rádiós Top 40)	35

=== Decade-end charts ===
Chart (2000–2009)	Position
Germany (Media Control GfK)	63

== Certifications ==
Region	Certification	Certified units/sales
Austria (IFPI Austria)	Gold	15,000^{*}
Belgium (BRMA)	Platinum	50,000^{*}
France (SNEP)	Diamond	500,000^{*}
Germany (BVMI)	Platinum	500,000^{‡}
Italy (FIMI)	Platinum	70,000^{‡}
Spain (Promusicae)	Platinum	60,000^{‡}
Summaries
Europe	—	2,000,000
^{*} Sales figures based on certification alone.^{‡} Sales+streaming figures based on certification alone.

== Release history ==
Region	Date	Format	Label	Ref.
United States	2002	Tropical radio	Premium	
United Kingdom	November 29, 2004	CD	Hit Mania	

== 3rd Wish version ==
"Obsesión (Si es amor)"

Single by 3rd Wish featuring Baby Bash

from the album Reflections of the South
- Released: 2004
- Length: 3:30
- Label: Skreem
- Songwriter: Anthony Santos
- Producer: Mintman

3rd Wish singles chronology
"Obsesión (Si es amor)" (2004)	"Niña" (2005)

In 2004, American R&B all-male group 3rd Wish covered the song under the title "Obsesión (Si es amor)", featuring Baby Bash for their album Reflections of the South. Produced by Danish producer Mintman and released as a single in 2004, the cover peaked at number two in Austria, number five in Germany, number seven in Switzerland, number 12 in France, and number 15 in the UK. On the Eurochart Hot 100, 3rd Wish's version peaked at number 19 the same week that Aventura's version first reached number one.

=== Track listings ===
European maxi-CD single

1. "Obsesión (Si es amor)" (radio edit) – 3:30
2. "Obsesión (Si es amor)" (video edit) – 3:56
3. "Obsesión (Si es amor)" (DJ Nasty remix) – 3:38
4. "Obsesión (Si es amor)" (radio edit without rap) – 3:19
5. "Obsesión (Si es amor)" (video—with Vany)

=== Charts ===
==== Weekly charts ====
Charts (2004)	Peak position
Austria (Ö3 Austria Top 40)	2
Belgium (Ultratip Bubbling Under Wallonia)	5
Europe (Eurochart Hot 100)	19
France (SNEP)	12
Germany (GfK)	5
Switzerland (Schweizer Hitparade)	7
Scottish Singles Sales (Official Charts)	52
UK Singles (Official Charts)	15

==== Year-end charts ====
Charts (2004)	Position
Austria (Ö3 Austria Top 40)	46
France (SNEP)	99
Germany (Media Control GfK)	30
Switzerland (Schweizer Hitparade)	70

== Frankie J version ==
"Obsession (No Es Amor)"

Single by Frankie J featuring Baby Bash

from the album The One
- Released: January 10, 2005
- Length: 3:45
- Label: Columbia
- Songwriters: Anthony "Romeo" Santos; Frankie J (English lyrics)
- Producer: Stewart Magee

Frankie J singles chronology
"Suga Suga" (2003)	"Obsession (No Es Amor)" (2005)	"How to Deal" (2006)

Baby Bash singles chronology
"That's My Lady (Money)" (2005)	"Obsession (No Es Amor)" (2005)	"Energy" (2006)

In 2005, Mexican-American singer Frankie J covered the song under the title "Obsession (No Es Amor)", featuring Baby Bash for his album The One. Released as a single on January 10, 2005, the cover peaked at number three on the US Billboard Hot 100, number five in Australia and number four in New Zealand. The song was produced by Australian-born UK-based producer Stewart Magee. Model Vida Guerra made a cameo in the video as Frankie J's love interest and object of his obsession.

=== Track listings ===
US 12-inch single

A1. "Obsession (No Es Amor)" (Luny Tunes reggaeton mix featuring Mr. Phillips) – 3:35
A2. "Obsession (No Es Amor)" (album version featuring Baby Bash) – 3:45
B1. "Obsession (No Es Amor)" (Sic Element club mix) – 8:19
B2. "Obsession (No Es Amor)" (Sic Element radio mix) – 3:47

Australian CD single

1. "Obsession (No Es Amor)" (featuring Baby Bash) – 3:45
2. "Obsession (No Es Amor)" (without rap) – 3:20
3. "Obsession (No Es Amor)" (Luny Tunes reggaeton mix featuring Mr. Phillips) – 3:35
4. "Obsession (No Es Amor)" (Sic Element radio mix) – 3:47

UK CD single

1. "Obsession (No Es Amor)" (album version featuring Baby Bash) – 3:45
2. "Obsession (No Es Amor)" (Luny Tunes reggaeton remix featuring Mr. Phillips) – 3:35

European maxi-CD single

1. "Obsession (No Es Amor)" (album version featuring Baby Bash) – 3:45
2. "Don't Wanna Try" – 4:04
3. "Obsession (No Es Amor)" (Sic Element club mix) – 8:18
4. "Obsession (No Es Amor)" (video)

=== Charts ===
==== Weekly charts ====
Charts (2005)	Peak position
Australia (ARIA)	5
Australian Urban (ARIA)	3
Canada CHR/Pop Top 30 (Radio & Records)	3
New Zealand (Recorded Music NZ)	4
Scottish Singles Sales (Official Charts)	52
UK Singles (Official Charts)	38
UK Hip Hop/R&B (Official Charts)	10
US Billboard Hot 100	3
US Dance Club Songs (Billboard)	45
US Dance Singles Sales (Billboard)	12
US Dance Airplay (Billboard)	17
US Hot Latin Songs (Billboard)	2
US Hot R&B/Hip-Hop Songs (Billboard)	69
US Pop Airplay (Billboard)	2
US Rhythmic Airplay (Billboard)	2

==== Year-end charts ====
Charts (2005)	Position
Australia (ARIA)	32
New Zealand (RIANZ)	46
US Billboard Hot 100	33
US Mainstream Top 40 (Billboard)	20
US Rhythmic Top 40 (Billboard)	9

=== Certifications ===
Region	Certification	Certified units/sales
Australia (ARIA)	Gold	35,000^{^}
New Zealand (RMNZ)	Gold	15,000^{‡}
United States (RIAA)	Gold	500,000^{*}
United States (RIAA) Mastertone	Platinum	1,000,000^{*}
^{*} Sales figures based on certification alone.^{^} Shipments figures based on certification alone.^{‡} Sales+streaming figures based on certification alone.

=== Release history ===
Region	Date	Format(s)	Label(s)	Ref.
United States	January 10, 2005	Rhythmic contemporary; contemporary hit radio	Columbia	
Australia	April 18, 2005	CD	Columbia	
United Kingdom	August 8, 2005	CD	Columbia	

== Tropical Family version ==
"Obsesión"

Single by Tropical Family featuring Kenza Farah and Lucenzo

from the album Tropical Family
- Released: July 1, 2013
- Recorded: 2013
- Genre: Latin pop
- Label: Play Loud

Kenza Farah singles chronology
"Coup de cœur" (2012)	"Obsesión" (2013)	"Avec Toi" (2013)

Lucenzo singles chronology
"Wine It Up"	"Obsesión" (2013)

The French collective musical project of cover songs of summer, Tropical Family included the song as track number 3. The single is credited as "Obsesión (Tropical Family)" and was performed by Kenza Farah and Lucenzo. The single is bilingual in Spanish and French with added French lyrics. The Spanish parts are sung by Lucenzo and the French by Farah. The single entered the SNEP French Singles Chart the same week at number 23.

=== Charts ===
Chart (2013)	Peak position
Belgium (Ultratop 50 Wallonia)	34
France (SNEP)	17

== See also ==
- List of best-selling Latin singles
