= Aventura (band) =

Dominican-American bachata group

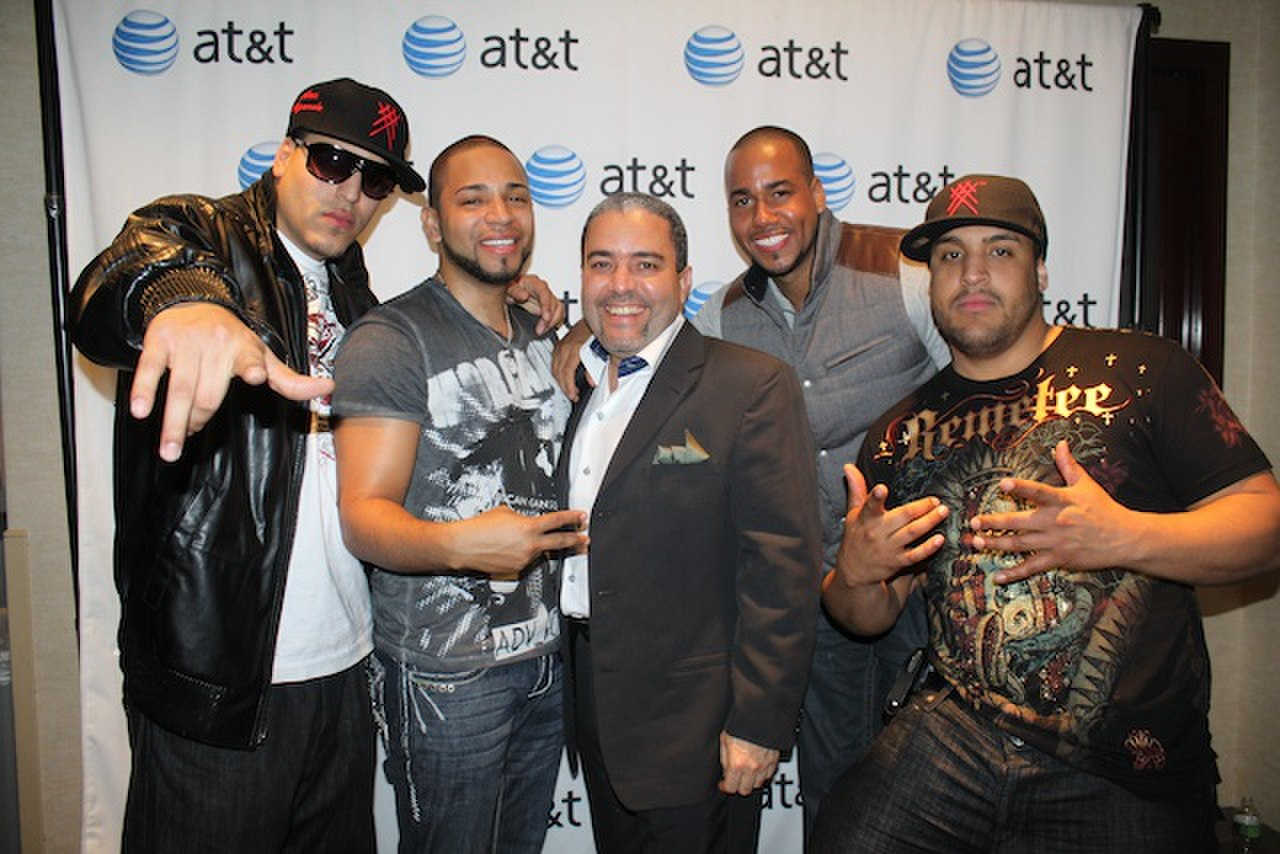
- Aventura group members

Background information
- Also known as: Los reyes de la bachata; Tu Grupo Favorito; Kings of Bachata; Los Tinellers (initially)
- Origin: The Bronx, New York
- Genres: Bachata; merengue; R&B; reggaeton
- Years active: 1994–2011; 2016; 2019–2021; 2024
- Labels: Premium Latin Music; Sony Latin
- Members: Anthony "Romeo" Santos; Henry Santos; Lenny Santos; Max Santos; (see Members section for others)
- Website: shopaventuramusica.com

Aventura (formerly known as Los Tinellers) is an American bachata group formed in The Bronx, New York. With the lineup always consisting of the members Romeo Santos, Henry Santos, Lenny Santos (Len Melody), and Max Santos (Max Agende), they are regarded as one of the most influential Latin groups of all time. All of the members are of Dominican descent, although Romeo is also half Puerto Rican on his mother's side. They were the first major bachata act to have originated in the United States instead of the Dominican Republic. The group was integral to the evolution of bachata music and are the pioneers of the modern bachata sound.

Aventura released five studio albums in a decade, creating many top 10 hits like "Obsesión", "Cuándo Volverás", "Un Beso", "Mi Corazoncito", "Los Infieles", "El Perdedor", "Por un Segundo", "Dile al Amor", among others. They have sold out many arenas including the world famous Madison Square Garden. Aventura has been nominated for awards such as American Music Awards, the Latin Grammy Awards, Billboard Latin Music Awards, and Premio Lo Nuestro. Aventura is one of the most internationally recognized Latin groups of the last two decades and frequently refer to themselves as "K.O.B.", or "Kings of Bachata".

== History ==
=== Formation, starting as Los Tinellers, and Trampa de Amor (1993–1996) ===
In 1993, Lenny Santos and his brother Max Santos formed a little band with a cousin of theirs and called themselves Banda Sueño. They would play mostly as a hobby. It did not last long, as the cousin was much older than Max and Lenny. They decided to look for a new singer around their age who could help them take their music career more seriously. Lenny was later introduced to Anthony via one of the group's musicians named Roney Fernandez, who attended the same school as Anthony. They clicked instantly, and the two started working on songs together. Anthony was a singer and composer who would sing with his cousin Henry at their local church choir. Anthony later introduced Lenny to his cousin Henry, who also joined the group. These four would form Los Tinellers, which is the word 'teenagers' but spelled in Spanish letters so non-English speaking Hispanics could pronounce it. The group would perform for their neighbors, at local stores, and in the streets for free in the Bronx.

On July 9, 1995, the group was discovered by Elvin Polanco. Polanco was the coordinator of the 1995 Bronx Dominican Parade. Lenny and Anthony asked him if they could perform on stage at the parade. Polanco gave them the opportunity and was impressed by the group. Seeing the potential in the group, he became their manager and helped them record their first studio album, despite having little funds. They released their first album in 1996 titled Trampa De Amor under Elca Productions. The album included songs that would be remade for later Aventura albums. One of them was "Cuándo Volverás", which would later become their debut single. Unfortunately, only Anthony and Lenny were on the cover because of Henry and Max being late due to train traffic. The album did not do well commercially, selling a total of five copies.

=== Re-invented as Aventura, creating urban bachata, and Generation Next (1996–2000) ===
In 1996, with the help of new manager Julio César García, the group created a new image. He re-invented the group to resemble popular American boy bands. He renamed the group Aventura, which is Spanish for "adventure". Later on, Elvin Polanco ran into some health problems which ended things between him and the group. In 1998, they signed a record deal with Premium Latin Music, Inc. With the help of the executive of the label, Franklin Romero, the group had the support they needed to finally expand and breakthrough in the music industry. Romero was also involved in the re-invention of the group becoming more boy band like.

On November 9, 1999, they released their debut album Generation Next along with a modernized and better known version of "Cuándo Volverás" as its main single in hopes of breaking bachata music into the mainstream from its traditional base. They slowly began to gather fans in Dominican Republic and in the east coast of the United States, especially in the cities of New York, Boston and Lancaster. The group was the first to experiment with fusing bachata with other genres like R&B, pop, hip-hop, reggae and rock. They were one of the first bachata acts to sing a bachata song in Spanglish (English and Spanish). The group innovated bachata with fresh lyrics that incorporated songs with different themes. They created their own tone in bachata guitar by adding guitar effects such as the wah, phaser, distortion, tremolo, and harmonizer. They also innovated the bachata bass with the use of bass techniques such as slapping, bass slides, and a lot of rock bass riffs into bachata. This would eventually lead to the creation of what is now known as urban bachata. While the album did have some success, it did not exceed expectations as the group was heavily criticized about the new style and the fact that they had added English in to the genre.

=== We Broke the Rules, Anthony becoming Romeo, and the expansion of bachata (2001–2003) ===
While at the beginning they didn't get the mainstream attention they were looking for with their debut album, the style they had introduced did help make the genre mainstream. In 2001, four songs were leaked to the public which were for their second studio album. The songs were "Todavía Me Amas", "Amor De Madre", "Enséñame A Olvidar", and "Obsesión" which featured Dominican-American singer Judy Santos. Thanks to the success of "Obsesión", the group got the big break they were waiting for and would eventually turn them into the icons that they are today. The song achieved huge success in many countries. It peaked at number 32 on the Billboard Tropical Songs chart in the U.S. It also topped many European charts by peaking at number 1 in seven countries, which made it peak at number 1 on the Eurochart Hot 100. This would expand bachata internationally as it reached countries where the genre was never heard before at the time. This would also be the start for Judy as a female vocalist for the group as she would eventually work for them in other songs.

Around this time, Anthony decided to go under the name Romeo Santos. He created an alter ego to be a more romantic character on stage to help him with his shyness. He came up with the name Romeo because of the song "Todavía Me Amas" in which he mentions Romeo and Juliet. This was also due to the fact there is another bachata artist by the name Antony Santos, who was the man that inspired him to become a bachata singer. Romeo would refer to himself as Anthony Santos from Aventura to be specific. Even though both singers had their names spelled differently, it was still pronounced the same way. This led the group and the record label to make the decision to have Anthony go under the name he is known today, Romeo Santos.

On July 2, 2002, they would release their second album under the Aventura name title We Broke the Rules. It peaked at number 5 on the Billboard Tropical Albums chart. It also peaked at number 1 in the French and Italian albums charts. The album would feature Judy Santos and Puerto Rican-American singer Toby Love, who worked for them as a back up vocalist until he left in 2005 to pursue a solo career. His voice was used for the songs "I Believe" and "Gone", a cover of the NSYNC song. In the same year, they would release their first live album titled En Vivo. It was based on their 2002 show at the United Palace in New York City. It was re-released in Europe on August 30, 2004, and renamed Unplugged. On January 11, 2011, it was released to the world under the title Live! 2002. In 2003, they released their first concert film, Aventura in Concert: Sold Out at the United Palace.

=== Love & Hate, God's Project, and mainstream breakthrough in the U.S. (2003–2006) ===
In 2003, the group released the main single for their third studio album titled "Hermanita". The song addressed issue like domestic violence, especially the mistreatment of women in the household. The song peaked at number 33 on the Billboard Hot Latin Songs chart and at number 3 on the Billboard Tropical Songs chart. On November 18, 2003, they released their third studio album, Love & Hate. It peaked at number 4 on the Billboard Tropical Albums chart and at number 3 in the Swiss albums chart. It is their first album to earn a gold and platinum certification in the United States by the Recording Industry Association of America (RIAA). In 2004, they released a special edition that was exclusive to Italy. It featured edited versions of the songs "Cuándo volverás" and "Obsesión". They released a 2005 edition as well that was released exclusively for Romania. In 2005, they released their second concert film, The Love & Hate Concert: Sold Out at the United Palace. It is based on a concert for Love & Hate that took place at the United Palace in New York City.

In February 2005, they released their first single for their fourth studio album "La Boda". It peaked at number 2 on the Billboard Tropical Airplay chart. On April 26, 2005, they released their fourth studio album, God's Project. This is their first album distributed by Sony Music Latin. On the Billboard charts, it peaked at number 133 on the Billboard 200, at number 5 on both Heatseekers Albums and Top Latin Albums charts, and at number 1 on the Tropical Albums chart making it the group's first number one album on that chart. It is considered the group's mainstream breakthrough album as they started to get more mainstream publicity in the United States. It was the best-selling tropical album of 2006 in the United States and was certified 4× platinum in the U.S. by the Recording Industry Association of America (RIAA). The album featured collaborations with Judy Santos, Anthony 'El Mayimbe' Santos, Nina Sky, Don Omar, and Tego Calderón who was featured in a hidden track. This album also featured the songs "Ella y Yo", "Un Beso", and "Angelito" which were released as singles later on.

On May 9, 2005, "Ella y Yo" was released as the album's second single. It featured Puerto Rican reggaeton artist Don Omar. It peaked at 97 on the Billboard Hot 100, at number 2 on the Hot Latin Songs chart and at number one on both the Latin Rhythm and Tropical Airplay Billboard charts. The music video was released in the same year. It took place in a bar. The video is about Romeo Santos and Don Omar having a conversation about love. On August 8, 2005, "Un Beso" was released as the third a single. It became the main single for the fourth studio album. The group paid tribute to Spanish musician Manzanita in this song. It peaked at number 6 on the Hot Latin Songs chart and at number 2 on the Tropical Airplay chart. Later that year, "Angelito" was released as the last single and peaked at 17 on the Tropical Airplay chart. This would also be the last song to feature Judy Santos as she would embark in her own music career. On March 10, 2006, Aventura would perform a sold-out show at The Theater at Madison Square Garden making it their first live performance at MSG.

=== K.O.B. Live and selling out Madison Square Garden (2006–2008) ===
On October 19, 2006, they released the single "Los Infieles" and while it is a studio song, it was released as the first single for their second live album. It peaked at number 4 on the Hot Latin Songs chart, at number 5 on the Latin Rhythm Airplay chart, and at number one on the Tropical Airplay chart. Later on, a remix was made which featured Mexican singer Frankie J. On December 19, 2006, they released their second live album, K.O.B. Live. It is a double-disc live album of Aventura's greatest hits from their first four studio albums. These live performances were recorded in the U.S. (New York City, Boston, Puerto Rico), Dominican Republic and Colombia along with audio skits of the band talking about the importance of performing in these places. It also featured a bonus DVD. The album peaked at No. 124 on the Billboard 200, at number 2 on the Billboard Top Latin Albums chart, and at number one on both the Heatseekers Albums and Tropical Albums charts. Despite being a live album, it included 5 studio songs: "Los Infieles", "Mi Corazoncito", "El Perdedor", "Controversia", and "José", a song dedicated to fallen soldiers.

On February 12, 2007, "Mi Corazoncito" was released as the second single for the live album. It peaked at number 7 on the Bubbling Under Hot 100, at number 2 on the Hot Latin Songs chart and at number one on both the Latin Rhythm and Tropical Airplay charts. The music video was released on April 3, 2007. It featured the Miss Universe 2003 pageant winner Amelia Vega. In the same year, Aventura were inducted into the Bronx Walk of Fame. On September 1, 2007, Aventura performed at Madison Square Garden as part of their K.O.B. Live Tour. This time they would perform at the 20,000 seat venue in front of a sold-out crowd. The concert featured artists like Don Omar, Anthony Santos, Wisin & Yandel, Miri Ben-Ari, Toby Love, and Héctor Acosta. On November 13, 2007, they would release their third live album and third concert film, Kings of Bachata: Sold Out at Madison Square Garden. It based on the sold out MSG show from September 1. The album peaked at No. 97 on the Billboard 200, at number 3 on the Top Latin Albums chart, and at number one on the Tropical Albums chart. It was certified 8× platinum in the U.S. by the RIAA.

On October 29, 2007, "El Perdedor" was released as the third single for K.O.B. Live. It peaked at number 5 on the Hot Latin Songs chart and at number one on both the Latin Rhythm and Tropical Airplay charts. The music video was released in 2008 and it featured highlights from the group's 2007 show at MSG. Later on, a remix was made which featured Puerto Rican singer and rapper Ken-Y. In the same year, they released their fourth live album, Live from the World, which was sold exclusively in the Dominican Republic. It is based on some of their best songs performed around the world. It featured a live bachata cover of the José José song "Lagrimas". The live performance took place in 2008 during a celebration of José José's career presented by the Latin Grammys. In December 2008, the band would sell out 5 nights at the José Miguel Agrelot Coliseum in San Juan, Puerto Rico from the 4th to the 7th, and the 10th of that month.

=== The Last, performing at the White House, and The Last Tour (2008–2011) ===
On November 10, 2008, they released the first single from their fifth studio album, "Por un Segundo". It became the group's first number one hit on the Hot Latin Songs chart. It also peaked at number one on both the Latin Rhythm and Tropical Songs charts. The song was awarded "Tropical Song of the Year" at the Premios Lo Nuestro 2010 awards. The music video was released in 2009 and featured the winner of Cycle 8 of America's Next Top Model, Jaslene Gonzalez. On April 27, 2009, they released the second single, "All Up 2 You". It featured Senegalese-American R&B singer Akon, and the Puerto Rican reggaeton duo Wisin & Yandel. The song peaked at number 4 on the Billboard Hot Latin Songs chart, at number 2 on the Tropical Airplay chart, and at number one on the Latin Rhythm Airplay chart. On April 23, 2009, the song was performed live as the opening act at the 2009 Latin Billboard Music Awards. The music video for the song was released on June 5, 2009.

On June 9, 2009, Aventura released their fifth and final studio album, The Last. It featured collaborations with Arturo Sandoval, Ludacris, Wyclef Jean, Akon and Wisin & Yandel. It peaked at number 4 on the Chilean albums chart and at number 2 on the Recordland Venezuelan albums chart. It is their best charting album on the U.S. Billboard charts as it peaked at number 5 on the Billboard 200, and at number one on both the Top Latin Albums chart, lasting 23 weeks on that spot and the Tropical Albums chart, lasting 50 weeks on that spot. It also included the songs "Su Veneno", "Dile al Amor", and "El Malo" which were later released as singles. On June 30, 2009, "Su Veneno" was released as the album's third single. It peaked at number 4 on the Hot Latin Songs chart, and at number one on the Tropical Airplay chart. A bolero version was also released as a separate single. The music video for the bachata version was released on July 20, 2009, and the music video for the bolero version was released the next day.

On October 13, 2009, "Dile al Amor" was released as the album's fourth single. It peaked at number 2 on the Billboard Bubbling Under Hot 100 chart. It also peaked at number one on the Billboard Hot Latin Tracks chart, which became the group's second number one hit on that chart. It also peaked at number one on the Tropical Songs chart, lasting 15 weeks on that spot. The music video was released on November 4, 2009. On the same day, Aventura was invited to perform their hit single "Su Veneno" at the White House for the 44th President of the United States, Barack Obama. They are the first bachata act to ever perform at the White House. On October 15, 2009, it aired on television as part of the "Fiesta Latina" episode of the TV series In Performance at the White House.

In early 2010, they sold out Madison Square Garden once again, but for a legendary four nights in a row at part of The Last Tour. They surpassed American artists such as Lady Gaga and Madonna in ticket sales, being one of the first Latin groups to do so. At one of the concerts they paid homage to Juan Luis Guerra, and even sang some songs with the Dominican singer. These concerts took place on January 20 and 21 and on February 1 and 2, 2010. On February 13, 2010, the group would perform at the Félix Sánchez Olympic Stadium in Santo Domingo, Dominican Republic in front of a crowd of about 50,000 to 60,000 people. On March 11, 2010, "El Malo" was released as the final single. It did not chart at first until it was re-released in mid-2010. It peaked at number 5 on the Hot Latin Songs chart and at number one on the Tropical Airplay chart. The music video was released on June 29, 2010. Later on, a remix was made featuring Dominican rapper Sensato. On April 29, 2010, Aventura were nominated for 12 awards at the 2010 Billboard Latin Music Awards. They won 9 of them, thus making them the top winners of that night. From December 3 to 5, 2010, the group performed for three nights at the José Miguel Agrelot Coliseum in San Juan, Puerto Rico. The very last concert of the tour took place on March 7, 2011, in Venezuela. This would also be their last concert as a group before they split up to pursue their own separate projects.

=== Hiatus, compilation albums, and first reunions (2011–2018) ===
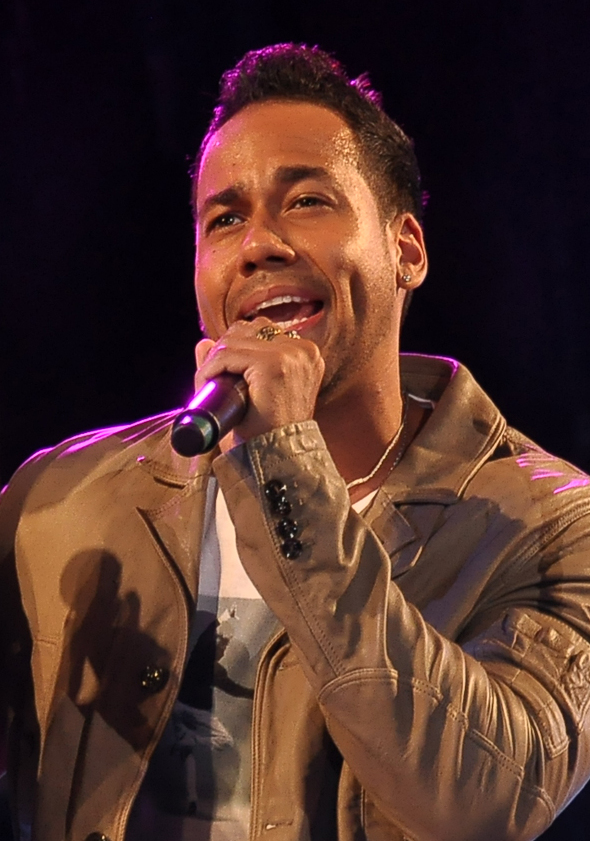
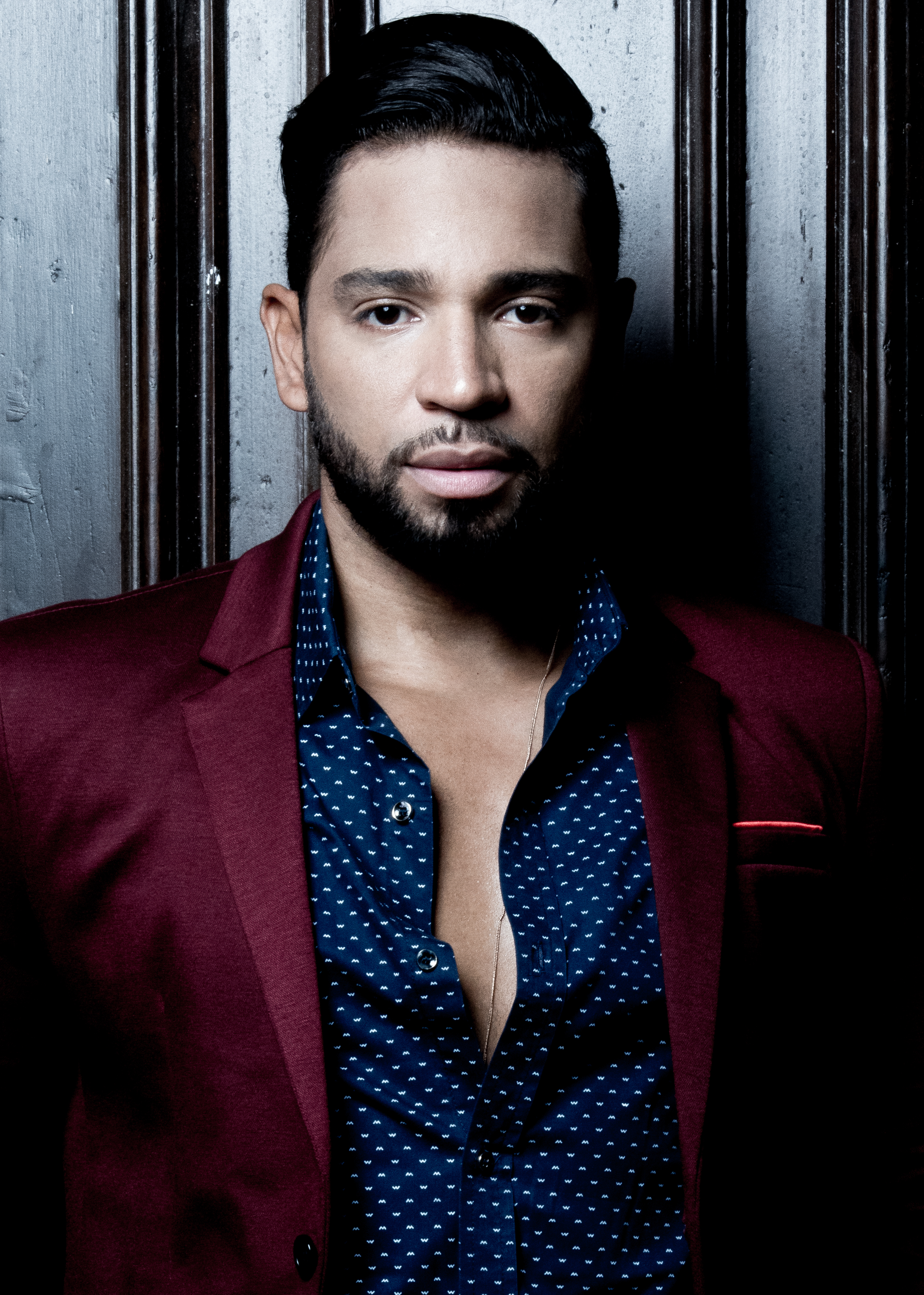
Romeo Santos in 2012 (left) and Henry Santos in 2016 (right).

In 2011, the group announced that they would be taking a hiatus to work on individual musical projects. Henry embarked on a respective solo career, looking to be accepted without the group. He signed with Siente Music, a record label which was associated with both Venemusic & Universal Music Group. He released his first two solo albums under the record label, Introducing Henry Santos in 2011 and My Way in 2013. Romeo took the opportunity to sign with Sony Music Latin, and embarked on his solo career as well. He released his first solo album Formula, Vol. 1 in 2011, which would eventually be the start of the Formula series. The following year, he then released his first live solo album, The King Stays King: Sold Out at Madison Square Garden. Then in 2014, he released Formula, Vol. 2, which was awarded album of the decade at the 2020 Billboard Latin Music Awards. Although Max wanted to focus more on his rap career, he joined his brother Lenny and formed their new bachata group called "D'Element." under Lenny's record label Element Music Group. They then joined Steve Styles from the bachata group Xtreme and renamed the group to Vena. The trio released 8 singles and an EP live album titled It's VENA (Live), which was released in 2015. The trio would split in 2015 as Styles left the group. At the same time, Max Santos worked alongside many dembow artists and also focused on his solo career as a rapper.

During the hiatus, they release a few compilation albums, 2 of them being greatest hits albums. One of them is titled 14 + 14. It was released on May 23, 2011, as an audio and music video album. It contains every song that has a music video from 2000 to 2010 along with the music videos as well with the exception of "All Up 2 You". The album features Judy Santos and Don Omar. The audio version peaked at number 132 on the Billboard 200 and at number one on both the Top Latin and Tropical Albums charts. On July 12, 2014, the group would reunite for one night only to close out the second night of Romeo's sold-out Yankee Stadium concert. On November 4, 2014, Sólo Para Mujeres was released. It is part of a series of compilation albums released by multiple artists with the same title that were released by Sony Music Latin. It features some of the group's most romantic songs. It peaked at number 15 on the Billboard Top Latin Albums chart and at number one on the Billboard Tropical Albums chart.

On December 1, 2015, it was announced on the band's website and social media that they would have a reunion tour for the whole month of February at the United Palace theater in New York City. Their first concert since their split started with a sold-out crowd on February 4, 2016. On the same day, they released Todavía Me Amas: Lo Mejor De Aventura. This greatest hits album was named after the 2002 single, "Todavía Me Amas". It features Judy Santos, Héctor Acosta, and Don Omar. It peaked at number 4 on the Billboard Top Latin Albums chart. It also peaked at number one on the Tropical Albums weekly chart and it has been positioned at number one numerous times since, for a combined total of 195 weeks at that position. It peaked at number one on the year-end chart in the same category in which it became the number one tropical album for five years straight from 2019 to 2023. It was certified 3× platinum in the U.S. by the RIAA. During the same month, the group would perform every Thursday to Sunday during the month of February with the final concert ending on February 28, 2016. They would have continued on with the tour, but Romeo had to finish the second leg of his Formula Vol. 2 tour.

Romeo would finish the tour and then would release his third studio solo album Golden in 2017. Meanwhile, Henry would continue as an independent artist as Siente Music closed down in 2015. Henry released his third album The Third in 2016. The following year, he released his first live solo album, The Live Album: Sólo Éxitos. The year after, he released his fourth studio album Shut Up & Listen. As for Lenny, he would form a new duo called DNA Latin Group with a singer named J Love and released two singles together. The duo then became a trio when singer Max joined and they then released a single. The trio did not last long as they ended things in early 2019.

=== Inmortal Tour (2019–2021) ===
On April 1, 2019, the group posted an image on their Instagram account teasing a new Aventura single called "Inmortal" slated to be released at 9PM, captioning it "#UTOPIA". At 9PM, Romeo uploaded a video saying that their new song would not be released at 9PM after all, and that it was intended to be an April Fools joke which led fans to become upset and lash out on social media. The following day, however, the group apologized and announced that the April Fools joke was not the song, but was the release date. They then previewed the new single "Inmortal" and its music video, stating that it was being released on April 5, as a part of Romeo's fourth studio and first collaboration album, Utopia. Eventually, the song was released on that date and it is their first single since 2010. It debuted at No. 95 on the Billboard Hot 100, and at number 5 on the Billboard Hot Latin Songs chart. It also peaked at number one on both the Latin and Tropical Airplay charts. On April 25, 2019, they performed the single live at the 2019 Billboard Latin Music Awards, alongside Raulin Rodriguez who performed "La Demanda" with Romeo prior to the other members appearing on stage. That same night, Aventura won an award for Tropical Duo/Group of the Year.

On September 21, 2019, the group reunited for Romeo's Utopia concert at MetLife Stadium in New Jersey. They performed hits such as "Dile al Amor", "Todavía Me Amas", and "Inmortal". The group performed "Obsesión" alongside Cardi B who would also performed her hit song "I Like It" at the concert. On December 8, 2019, an announcement was made regarding the band's upcoming US tour, La Gira Inmortal. It was their first tour since splitting in 2011, and began in Los Angeles on February 5, 2020. In March 2020, the group had announced that concerts were postponed due to the COVID-19 pandemic. This included 5 shows at the Radio City Music Hall in New York City that was supposed to take place from March 16 to the 19, and March 22, 2020. It was eventually postponed for the dates July 9 to the 12. However, it was eventually canceled just like all the other scheduled or postponed shows.

In June 2021, Aventura announced the return of the Inmortal Tour. But instead of doing the shows in the venues that were originally planned before their cancelation, they decided to play at stadiums and big arenas in certain cities. Before the tour started, the group released the single Volví on August 3, 2021, featuring Bad Bunny. On August 14, the tour started in Miami, Florida at Hard Rock Stadium. They became the first Latin act to ever sell out the stadium. The tour ended on October 9, 2021, in East Rutherford, New Jersey, at MetLife Stadium. This was the same venue Romeo Santos sold out 2 years prior. They had a show for Arlington, Texas, at Globe Life Field scheduled on August 22, 2021. However it was postpone to October 14, 2021. This would have been the last concert but for some unknown reason the concert never happened. It was never mentioned. There was no news nor any announcements were made about why it was canceled. On November 4, 2021, Aventura announced their very last concert to be set for December 18, 2021, At the Félix Sánchez Olympic Stadium in Santo Domingo, Dominican Republic. They sold out tickets 3 days after the day they went on sale. A second concert was set for December 19, 2021, which would eventually be their final concert together. Both shows were successful.

=== Possible forthcoming album, final reunion, and Cerrando Ciclos (2022–2025) ===
In 2022 and 2023, Romeo released his fifth studio album Formula, Vol. 3, and went on a tour which included numerous sold-out stadium shows. Meanwhile, Henry would release numerous singles. As for Lenny and Max, they would have these special events tour where they would play Aventura hits in clubs and small venues. Also, Max got to release rap singles and a few albums eventually. The albums were, Fama Y Dolor, Rise of the Phoenix, and Max Beats Vol. 1.

On May 10, 2022, Max "Agende" Santos was interviewed by Mega Atlanta Radio. He mentioned a forthcoming album was in the works, but that he had no concrete announcement to make. Romeo's fifth studio solo album, Formula, Vol. 3, included a skit in which a preview of a song was played. Fans claimed that the snippet didn't sound like a Romeo Santos song, but an Aventura song instead, which insinuated that the group would eventually reunite soon.

On February 25, 2024, Romeo posted a social media, announcing that he would be posting something the following day. The next day, every member of the group posted a video that indicated that they were back. The following day, they announced dates for their tour, Cerrando Ciclos, which is considered the group's final tour. On April 2, 2024, they released their first single since 2021 and first bachata song since 2019, "Brindo Con Agua". It was released under Henry's record label Hustlehard Entertainment LLC. It is also the fifth song and first single from the group in which Henry is the lead vocalist. This is the second Aventura song to be featured in one of the members solo projects instead of an album by the group as it is the eighth and lead single for Henry's upcoming sixth studio album, 2.0. The album was released on May 31, 2024. Aventura have hinted at a possible group album, but no official announcement was ever made. The tour started at the beginning of the same month as the release of Henry's album at the Golden 1 Center in Sacramento, California, United States, and it ended on at the Félix Sánchez Olympic Stadium in Santo Domingo, Dominican Republic on January 5, 2025.

== Artistry ==
=== Musical style ===
While the group uses many genres in their music, they are mostly a bachata band. Unlike traditional bachata artists, Aventura uses other genres like R&B, pop, hip-hop, reggae and rock mixed with their bachata songs. Anthony innovated bachata with fresh lyrics that incorporated songs with different themes, instead of just singing about heartbreak. Lenny innovated bachata guitar with his use of electric guitars. He also innovated the tone of bachata guitar by adding guitar effects such as the wah, phaser, distortion, tremolo, and harmonizer. Max innovated the bachata bass with his use of bass techniques such as slapping and bass slides. Max incorporated a lot of rock bass riffs into bachata. They are the creators of the urban style of bachata. As Los Tinellers, they started off as a traditional bachata group. In the late 1990s, they would re-invent themselves as Aventura and started to add a more Americanized style to the genre.

=== Influences ===
They have been influenced by many Latin and American artists. In Bachata, their influences include artists like Juan Luis Guerra, Raulín Rodríguez, Luis Vargas, and Anthony Santos. Romeo even considers Anthony as a father figure in the music business.

== Legacy ==
The group have been widely dubbed the Kings of Modern Bachata, K.O.B. for short. They are credited with making Bachata a musical genre recognized worldwide and for broadening its overall appeal. With their 2002 single Obsesión, the song had a wide cultural impact, launching their careers to heights they themselves never imagined. They have sold millions of albums, have broken numerous records, and have sold out multiple arenas and stadiums year over year during their heights as a band.

The group's musical style led to them being pioneers in creating the Urban Bachata sound, having inspired artists like Prince Royce, Leslie Grace, among others. They have paved the way for groups such as Xtreme, Bachata Heightz, 24 Horas, Optimo, among others.

== Members ==
=== Principal members ===
- Anthony "Romeo" Santos – lead vocals, backing vocals, songwriter, composer, producer (1994–2011, 2016, 2019–2021, 2024)
- Henry Santos – lead vocals, backing vocals, songwriter, composer, producer (1994–2011, 2016, 2019–2021, 2024)
- Lenny Santos – lead guitar, rhythm guitar, electric guitar, arranger, producer, band director (1994–2011, 2016, 2019–2021, 2024)
- Max Santos – bass guitar, rapper (1994–2011, 2016, 2019–2021, 2024)

=== Backing members ===
They weren't official members of group, but they held supporting roles.

- Toby Love – backing vocals, congas (2002, 2006, 2007)
- Judy Santos – female vocals (2002, 2003, 2005)

== Discography ==
=== Studio ===
As Los Tinellers

- Trampa de Amor (1996)

As Aventura

- Generation Next (1999)
- We Broke the Rules (2002)
- Love & Hate (2003)
- God's Project (2005)
- The Last (2009)

=== Live ===
- Unplugged (2004)
- K.O.B. Live (2006)
- Kings Of Bachata: Sold Out At Madison Square Garden (2007)
- Live From The World (2008) (Only available in Dominican Republic)

=== Greatest Hits or Compilation ===
- 14 + 14 (2011)
- Sólo Para Mujeres (2014)
- Todavía Me Amas: Lo Mejor De Aventura (2016)

=== DVDs ===
- Aventura In Concert: Sold Out At The United Palace (2003)
- We Broke the Rules (DVD) (2004)
- The Love & Hate Concert: Sold Out At The United Palace (2005)
- Kings Of Bachata: Sold Out At Madison Square Garden (2007)
- 14 + 14 (2011)

== Concert tours ==
- Love & Hate Tour (2004)
- God's Project Tour (2005–2006)
- K.O.B Live! (2007–08)
- Corazoncito World Tour (2008–09)
- The Last Tour (2009–2011)
- Aventura Reunion In NYC (2016)
- Inmortal Tour (2020–2021)
- Cerrando Ciclos (2024–2025)

== Awards and nominations ==
Aventura have won over 60 awards throughout their career. However, they have never won a Grammy or a Latin Grammy Award. They had one Latin Grammy Award nomination in 2007 for best Contemporary Tropical Album (for their K.O.B. Live album).

== See also ==
- List of Hispanic and Latino Americans
- List of people from the Dominican Republic
