= Cuándo Volverás =

1999 single by Aventura

Single by Aventura

from the album Trampa de Amor and Generation Next
- Released: 1995 (Original version); 1999 (Generation Next Version); 2004 (Edit)
- Recorded: 1995 (Original version); 1999 (Generation Next Version)
- Genre: Bachata
- Length: 4:38 (Original version); 3:30 (Generation Next Version); 3:05 (2004 Edit)
- Label: Premium Latin Music
- Songwriter: Anthony "Romeo" Santos
- Producer: Xandro Martinez

Aventura singles chronology
"Cuándo Volverás" (1999)	"Obsesión" (2002)

Music video
- "Cuándo Volverás" on YouTube

"Cuándo Volverás" (When Will You Return) is a song recorded by bachata group Aventura. It served as the group's debut single from their debut album Generation Next (1999). The song reached big recognition in many Spanish-speaking countries and among the Latin community in the United States, reaching number six in Italy, after its release in 2004. There is a fully Spanish version and a Spanglish (English and Spanish) version of this song.

== Background ==
The song was originally recorded back in 1995 for their album Trampa de Amor back when they were called Los Tinellers. This version was more traditional bachata based. Four years later, the modern version and the Spanglish version was released for their debut album, Generation Next.

== In multiple albums ==
Besides being in Trampa de Amor, Generation Next, 3 live albums, and multiple compilation albums, the song is also included in the second studio album, We Broke the Rules. as a replacement for "Perdi El Control". It is also part of to two special editions of their third studio album, Love & Hate. The 2004 special edition, which was exclusively for Italy, featured the Spanglish version and a 2004 edited version. The 2005 special edition, which was exclusively for Romania, had the Spanish version and a dance remix of the song.

== Music video ==
The music video of "Cuándo Volverás" was shot in New York where Aventura appears to try to sneak in a studio after a female police officer doesn't let them go in.

== Charts ==
Chart (2004)	Peak Position
Austria (Ö3 Austria Top 40)	69
Germany (GfK)	47
Italy (FIMI)	6
Switzerland (Schweizer Hitparade)	52
