= 2009 in Latin music =

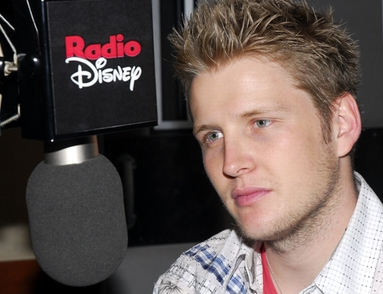
Mexico singer Alexander Acha won the Latin Grammy Award for Best New Artist.

This is a list of notable events in Latin music (music from Spanish- and Portuguese-speaking areas of Latin America, Europe, and the United States) that took place in 2009.

== Events ==
- April 23 – The 16th Billboard Latin Music Awards are held at the BankUnited Center at the University of Miami in Coral Gables, Florida.
  - Panamanian singer and songwriter Flex wins the Billboard Latin Music Award for Hot Latin Song of the Year for "Te Quiero".
  - 95/08 by Spanish singer and songwriter Enrique Iglesias wins the Billboard Latin Music Award for Top Latin Album of the Year.
  - Mexican-American musician Carlos Santana receives a Lifetime achievement award.
- November 5 – The 10th Annual Latin Grammy Awards are held at the Mandalay Bay Events Center in Las Vegas, Nevada.
  - Puerto Rican band Calle 13 and Mexican group Café Tacuba win the Latin Grammy Award for Record of the Year for "No Hay Nadie Como Tú".
  - Los de Atrás Vienen Conmigo by Calle 13 wins the Latin Grammy Award for Album of the Year.
  - Argentine artist Claudia Brant, Puerto Rican musician Luis Fonsi and American artist Gen Rubin win the Latin Grammy Award for Song of the Year for "Aquí Estoy Yo".
  - Alexander Acha wins Best New Artist.

== Number-one albums and singles by country ==
- List of number-one albums of 2009 (Mexico)
- List of number-one albums of 2009 (Spain)
- List of number-one singles of 2009 (Spain)
- List of number-one Billboard Top Latin Albums of 2009
- List of number-one Billboard Hot Latin Songs of 2009

== Awards ==
- 2009 Premio Lo Nuestro
- 2009 Billboard Latin Music Awards
- 2009 Latin Grammy Awards
- 2009 Tejano Music Awards

== Albums released ==
=== First quarter ===
==== January ====
Day	Title	Artist	Genre(s)	Singles	Label
1	Sepulveda Boulevard	Charlie Sepulveda and The Turnaround	Latin jazz		
1	Romântico ao Vivo	Harmonia do Samba	Samba		
13	Coba Coba	Novalima	Latin alternative		
20	A Man and His Songs: Alma de Poeta	Tite Curet Alonso	Tropical		Codigo Music
27	Mentir Por Amor	Conjunto Primavera	Norteño, Latin pop		Fonovisa
27	La Evolución Romantic Style	Flex	R&B, reggaeton, Latin pop	"Te Dejaré" "Dime Si Te Vas Con Él" "Te Amo Tanto"	EMI
27	Evolución de Amor	Los Temerarios	Ballad		Fonovisa
27	XV	El Poder del Norte	Norteño, ranchera		Disc Auvers
29	Necesito Más de Ti	Duelo	Norteño		Fonovisa
29	Yo No Canto, Pero Lo Intentamos	Espinoza Paz	Latin pop, banda, norteño		Disa

==== February ====
Day	Title	Artist	Genre(s)	Singles	Label
3	La Clika	Los Inquietos del Norte			
4	Áurea	Geoffrey Keezer		Latin jazz	
10	Brazilliance X4	Claudio Roditi		Latin jazz	
10	It's About Time	Orestes Vilató		Tropical	
17	Quiéreme Más	Patrulla 81	Tejano, duranguense		Disa
17	Live: En Vivo Desde México	Alacranes Musical	Tejano, banda, duranguense		Aguila Records
17	Vuelve Conmigo	Los Player's	Ranchera		Musart
17	En Vivo Desde Durango	Los Creadorez del Pasito Duranguense de Alfredo Ramírez	Banda, tejano, Latin pop		Disa
24	Al Cien Por Millón	El Trigillo Palma	Banda, tejano		Fonovisa
24	Barracuda	Kinky	Latin alternative		
24	Las Cosas Son Como Son	Ricardo Montaner	Latin pop, ballad	"Para Un Poco"	EMI
24	Corridos Con Banda	Dareyes de la Sierra	Norteño, ranchera, tejano		Disa
24	Paso Firme	Eddy Herrera	Merengue		

==== March ====
Day	Title	Artist	Genre(s)	Singles	Label
1	Ao Vivo na Ilha da Magia	Exaltasamba	Samba		
1	Trem da Minha Vida – Ao Vivo	Jorge Vercillo	MPB		
1	De Volta aos Bares	Bruno & Marrone	Música sertaneja		
1	As Músicas do Filme O Menino da Porteira	Daniel	Brazilian roots		
1	Despedida	Edson & Hudson	Música sertaneja		
3	Aquí Estaré	David Lee Garza & Los Musicales	Tejano		DLG Records
3	Sin Frenos	La Quinta Estación	Latin pop, pop rock	"Que te Quería" "Recuérdame"	Sony Music
3	Mi Complemento	Los Huracanes del Norte	Norteño, Latin pop		Garmex Music
3	Recordando Josefa	Avizo	Tejano		
10	Solo Por Ti	Aliados de la Sierra	Tejano, duranguense		American Show Latin
10	Nueva Ilusión	Majestad de la Sierra	Regional Mexican		Disa
10	Para Olvidarte de Mí	RBD	Latin pop, pop rock	"Para Olvidarte de Mí"	EMI
10	Kimba Fá	Eva Ayllón	Tejano, duranguense		American Show Latin
17	Calle Ilusión	Álex Ubago	Latin pop		
24	El Patrón	Tito El Bambino	Reggaeton, Latin pop	"El Amor" "Mi Cama Huele a Ti"	Universal Music Latin
24	Más Adelante	La Arrolladora Banda El Limón	Banda, corrido, Latin pop		Disa
24	Carcel de Sueños	Kinto Sol	Hardcore hip hop		Virus Enterprises
24	Yanni Voces	Yanni	Instrumental		Yanni Wake Entertainment
24	¿Y Tú Qué Harías?	Fidel Rueda & Los Buitres de Culiacán	Regional Mexican		Sony BMG
24	Across The Divide	Omar Sosa			
31	Somos Mucha... ¡Dinastía!	La Dinastia de Tuzantla Michoacan	Ranchera, Latin pop		Discos Ciudad
31	Sueños	Palomo	Regional Mexican		Disa
31	16 Narco Corridos	Larry Hernandez	Regional Mexican		

=== Second quarter ===
==== April ====
Day	Title	Artist	Genre(s)	Singles	Label
1	MTV ao Vivo	Arlindo Cruz	Samba		
7	Hierba Mala Nunca Muere	El Compa Sacra			
7	Flamenco	Enrique Morente	Flamenco		
8	Apasionado Por Tí	Rojo	Latin Christian		
9	El Mensaje	Rey Ruiz	Salsa	"Si Tú Te Vas" "La Ví Llegar"	
13	Aocaná	Ojos de Brujo			
14	Moviditas y Cumbias Bien Chulas	Los Caminantes	Tejano, Latin pop		Sony Music
14	Amantes	Ponzoña Musical	Banda, Latin pop		American Show Latin
14	The Last	Aventura	Bachata	"Por un Segundo" "All Up 2 You" "Su Veneno" "Dile al Amor" "El Malo"	Premium Latin
14	Dejame Soñar	Cumbre Norteña	Norteño		
14	Moving Forward	Bernie Williams			
15	Zii e Zie	Caetano Veloso			
21	Welcome to the Jungle	Franco El Gorila	Reggaeton, hip hop	"He Querido Quererte"	WY Records, Machete Music
21	Pienso En Ti	Laberinto	Tropical		Musart
21	La Introduccion	Carlos & Alejandra	Bachata	"Cuanto Duele"	
21	Se Renta Un Corazón	Cardenales de Nuevo León	Norteño		
27	O Pequeno Burguês!!	Martinho da Vila	Samba		
28	iDon	Don Omar	Reggaeton, electropop	"Virtual Diva" "Sexy Robótica" "Ciao Bella"	Machete Music
28	Compréndeme	Germán Montero	Banda, norteño, Latin pop		Fonovisa
28	El Culpable Soy Yo	Cristian Castro	Latin pop	"No Me Digas" "El Culpable Soy Yo"	Universal Music Latin
28	¿Quién Es Usted?	Sergio Vega	Norteño, ranchera		Disa
28	Por Si No Hay Mañana	Samuel Hernandez	Latin pop, tejano		SH Productions
28	Tu Esclavo y Amo	Lupillo Rivera	Regional Mexican		Disa
28	Da' Zoo	Da' Zoo	Dance-pop, Latin pop		Sony Music Latin
28	Se Nos Murio el Amor	El Guero Y Su Banda Centenario			
28	Malditas canciones	Coti	Latin pop		
28	Compréndeme	Germán Montero	Banda		
28	Siempre	Costumbre	Norteño		
28	Roupa Nova em Londres	Roupa Nova	Brazilian pop		

==== May ====
Day	Title	Artist	Genre(s)	Singles	Label
5	Pura Pasión	Los Horóscopos de Durango	Corrido, ranchera, duranguense		Disa
5	Bach in Havana	Tiempo Libre	Tropical		
5	Andrés: Obras Incompletas	Andrés Calamaro			
7	Hogar	Volován	Rock		
12	Cantora 1	Mercedes Sosa			
12	A Las Buenas y A Las Malas	Rosana			
12	Kenya Revisited Live	Bobby Sanabria	Latin jazz		
15	Orquesta Reciclando	Jarabe de Palo	Latin pop		
19	Pegando Con Tuba	Los Cuates de Sinaloa	Corrido, norteño, tejano		Sony Music Latin
19	Amatoria	Federico Aubele	Pop rock, electronica		ESL Music
19	Ciclos	Luis Enrique	Salsa	"Yo No Sé Mañana" "Como Volver a Ser Feliz" "Sonríe"	Top Stop Music
19	Free Tempo	Tempo			
26	La Revolución	Wisin & Yandel	Reggaeton, R&B, electropop	"Mujeres in the Club" "Abusadora" "Gracias a Ti"	WY Records, Machete
26	Una Copa Más	Dareyes de la Sierra	Norteño, ranchera, tejano		Disa
26	Simplemente... El Torito	Héctor Acosta	Bachata, merengue	"Tu Primera Vez" "No Me Lloren" "Me Puedo Matar"	D.A.M. Production
26	Vientos de Cambio	Cuisillos de Arturo Macias	Banda, corrido, Latin pop		Musart
26	Bach: Cello Suites	Andrés Díaz	Classical		

==== June ====
Day	Title	Artist	Genre(s)	Singles	Label
2	Como Un Tatuaje	K-Paz de la Sierra	Norteño, ranchera		Disa
2	Pese a Quien Le Pese	Los Rieleros del Norte	Norteño, tex-mex		Fonovisa
3	Sacos Plásticos	Titãs	Brazilian rock		
9	Estás Seleccionada	Grupo Machos	Banda, ranchera, tejano		Sony Music Latin
9	Commercial	Los Amigos Invisibles	Latin alternative		
9	Pode Entrar	Ivete Sangalo	Brazilian pop		
9	Cinema	Cachorro Grande	Brazilian rock		
12	Esperando Tu Voz	Paulina Aguirre	Latin Christian		
16	Desde La Patria En Vivo!	El Trono de México	Banda, norteño, tejano		Fonovisa
16	La Reina de la Banda	Graciela Beltrán	Banda, tejano, Latin pop		Fonovisa
16	10 Aniversario	Mariachi Divas de Cindy Shea	Mariachi		
16	Hubris I & II	Andreas Kisser	Brazilian rock		
23	Gran City Pop	Paulina Rubio	Latin pop, dance-pop	"Causa y Efecto" "Ni Rosas Ni Juguetes" "Algo de Ti"	Universal Music Latino
23	La Jefa	Alicia Villarreal	Latin pop		Fonovisa
23	Quiero Que Me Quieras	Huichol Musical	Banda		Latin Power Music
23	Fantasía Musical	Trebol Clan	Reggaeton	"Dígale" "Me Hipnotizas"	Machete Music
23	Gente común, sueños extraordinarios	Tercer Cielo	Latin Christian		
23	Te Acuerdas...	Francisco Céspedes	Latin pop		
23	No sé si es Baires o Madrid	Fito Páez	Latin pop		
25	Oro	Bengala	Latin alternative		
29	Things I Wanted To Do	Chembo Corniel	Latin jazz		
30	Cumbia Con Soul	Cruz Martínez y Los Super Reyes	Cumbia, Latin pop		Warner Music México
30	Pa' Alborotar a la Plebada	El Trigrillo Palma	Tejano		Fonovisa
30	Borders y Bailes	Los Texmaniacs	Tejano		
30	El Dueño del Flow	Omega "El Fuerte"	Merengue	"Si Te Vas/¿Qué Tengo Que Hacer?" "Merengue Electronico"	

=== Third quarter ===
==== July ====
Day	Title	Artist	Genre(s)	Singles	Label
7	Necesito de Ti	Vicente Fernández	mariachi, ranchera		Sony Music Latin
7	Si Tu Te Vas	Tierra Cali			
7	Vagarosa	CéU			
14	Y.	Bebe			
14	Corazón Ranchero	Shaila Dúrcal			
14	Divina	Stefani Montiel	Tejano		
14	Corazón Ranchero	Shaila Dúrcal	Ranchera		
14	Conjuntazzo	Joel Guzman and Sarah Fox	Tejano		
14	Paseo de Gracia	Vicente Amigo	Flamenco		
17	Esperando Verte	Niña Pastori	Flamenco		
20	Maria Gadú	Maria Gadú			
21	Não Vou Pro Céu, Mas Já Não Vivo no Chão	João Bosco	MPB		
21	Slow Music	Joyce	MPB		
23	Balaio de Amor	Elba Ramalho	Brazilian roots		
28	Avanzando en la Vida	Los Creadorez del Pasito Duranguense de Alfredo Ramírez			
28	Estoy de Pie	Marlon	Salsa	"Hagámoslo Aunque Duela"	

==== August ====
Day	Title	Artist	Genre(s)	Singles	Label
11	Sólo Contigo	Pesado			
17	Cantares del Subdesarrollo	Rubén Blades			
18	Contigo Para Siempre	Conjunto Atardecer			
18	Celebremos Juntos	Diomedes Díaz	Vallenato		
18	Mexicano Hasta las Pampas	Diego Verdaguer	Ranchero		
21	Siempre a Punto	Orquesta América	Tropical		
25	Pegadito Al Corazón	Joan Sebastian			
25	Esta Plena	Miguel Zenón		Latin jazz	

==== September ====
Day	Title	Artist	Genre(s)	Singles	Label
1	Multishow ao Vivo	Rita Lee	Brazilian pop		
1	Certa Manhã Acordei de Sonhos Intranquilos	Otto	Manguebeat, Rock, MPB		
8	La Granja	Los Tigres del Norte	norteño		Fonovisa
8	Acesa	Alcione	Samba		
8	Esse Alguém Sou Eu	Leonardo	Música sertaneja		
9	MPB Pras Crianças	Banda de Boca	Children's		
15	Mi Plan	Nelly Furtado	Latin pop	"Manos al Aire" "Más" "Bajo Otra Luz"	Nelstar, Universal Music Latino
15	Tributo 45 Aniversario	Mario Ortiz All Star Band	Salsa		
15	Off and On: The Music of Moacir Santos	Mark Levine and The Latin Tinge	Latin jazz		
15	Psychedelic Blues	Poncho Sanchez	Latin jazz		
22	Boleto de Entrada	Kany García	Latin pop	"Feliz" "Esta Vida Tuya Y Mía" "Para Volver a Amar" "Hoy"	Sony Music Latin
22	Album de Cuba	Lucrecia	Tropical		
25	Camisa 10 Joga Bola Até na Chuva	Charlie Brown Jr.	Brazilian rock		
28	Jenni: Super Deluxe	Jenni Rivera	banda	"Ovarios"	Fonovisa
29	Fuerza natural	Gustavo Cerati	Rock		
29	William Kraft: Encounters	Southwest Chamber Music and Tambuco Percussion Ensemble	Classical		

=== Fourth quarter ===
==== October ====
Day	Title	Artist	Genre(s)	Singles	Label
8	Desafiando la gravedad	Chenoa	Pop	"Duele" "Buenas Noticias"	
13	Se Pegó la Mania	Grupo Manía	Merengue	"Carita Linda"	
13	Salón Buenos Aires	Miguel del Águila	Classical		
20	Sin Mirar Atrás	David Bisbal	Latin pop	"Esclavo de Sus Besos" "Mi Princesa" "Sin Mirar Atrás" "24 Horas"	Universal Music Spain
20	Amarte a la Antigua	Pedro Fernández	Ranchera		
20	Con Banda	K-Paz de la Sierra	Banda		
20	Muy Personal	Álvaro Torres	Latin Christian		
22	Tua	Maria Bethânia			
23	Black Flamenco	Estrella	Latin pop		
27	Soy	Ednita Nazario	Latin pop		
27	El Último Trago	Concha Buika	Tropical		
27	A Night Of Classics In El Chuco	Little Joe & La Familia	Tejano		
27	Revolutionized	Ruben Ramos & The Mexican Revolution	Tejano		

==== November ====
Day	Title	Artist	Genre(s)	Singles	Label
3	Te Puedo Sentir	Alex Campos	Latin Christian		
10	Paraíso Express	Alejandro Sanz	Latin pop	"Looking for Paradise" "Desde Cuándo" "Nuestro Amor Será Leyenda" "Lola Soledad"	Warner Music Latina
10	El Patrón: La Victoria	Tito El Bambino	Reggaeton, Latin pop	"Feliz Navidad" "Te Pido Perdón" "Te Comencé a Querer"	Universal Music Latin
10	Yo Mismo	Víctor Manuelle	Salsa	"Mírame"	
10	La Bodega	Totó La Momposina	Tropical		
17	En Vivo Desde Culiacan	Larry Hernandez	Regional Mexican		
17	Cuéntame	Rosario	Latin pop		
17	Vinagre y Rosas	Joaquín Sabina	Latin pop		
17	Babilla	Vico C	Reggaeton		
17	Desde La Cantina Vol. 1.	Pesado	Norteño		
17	Retro-Corridos	Los Tucanes de Tijuana	Norteño		
17	Primera Fila	Thalía	Latin pop	"Equivocada" "Qué será de ti" "Con la Duda" "Estoy enamorado" "Enséñame a vivir" "El Próximo Viernes"	Sony Music Latin
17	La Melodia De La Calle: Updated	Tony Dize	Reggaeton	"Solos" "El Doctorado"	Pina Records, SML
23	Mi Navidad	Andrea Bocelli	Latin pop		
23	Con La Fuerza del Corrido	El Chapo de Sinaloa	Bamda		
24	Nouveau Latino	Nestor Torres	Latin jazz		
24	Volvio La Navidad	Johnny Ventura	Tropical		

==== December ====
Day	Title	Artist	Genre(s)	Singles	Label
1	El Príncipe	Cosculluela	Reggaeton		
1	Me Gusta Todo de Tí	Banda el Recodo	Banda	"Me Gusta Todo de Ti"	
1	La Gran Señora	Jenni Rivera	Ranchera	"Ya Lo Sé" "Por Que No Le Calas" "Déjame Volver Contigo" "Amarga Navidad" "La Gran Señora"	Fonovisa
1	Classic	Intocable	Norteño		
1	Horizonte Distante	Rosa de Saron	Latin Christian		
8	Dos Mundos: Evolución	Alejandro Fernández	Latin pop	"Se Me Va la Voz"	Universal Music Latino
8	Dos Mundos: Tradición	Alejandro Fernández	Ranchera	"Estuvé"	Universal Music Latino
8	¡Ando Bien Pedo!	Banda Los Recoditos	Banda	"Ando Bien Pedo"	Disa
8	Live Gira Mundial 09	Laura Pausini	Latin pop		
21	Éxitos y Más	NG2	Salsa	"Voy a Pintarte"	
22	Bueno y Más	Orquesta Guayacán	Salsa		

=== Dates unknown ===
Title	Artist	Genre(s)	Singles	Label
Hu Hu Hu	Natalia Lafourcade			
Coplas del Querer	Miguel Poveda	Flamenco		
Pelo Sabor do Gesto	Zélia Duncan	MPB		
Curtição	João Bosco & Vinícius	Música sertaneja		
Dramas y Caballeros	Luis Ramiro			
Despertar	India Martínez			
Gian Marco En Vivo Desde El Lunario	Gian Marco Zignago			
Métodos de Placer Instantáneo	Aleks Syntek	Latin pop		
X-Anniversarium	Estopa	Latin pop		
Jotdog	Jotdog	Latin pop		
Bipolar	El Cuarteto de Nos	Latin alternative		
Soy Tu Maestro	La Original Banda El Limón de Salvador Lizarraga	Banda		
Española	Niño Josele	Flamenco		
Devoción	Danilo Montero	Latin Christian		
Sete Chaves	NX Zero	Brazilian rock		
Tô Fazendo a Minha Parte	Diogo Nogueira	Samba		
MTV Especial Zeca Pagodinho Uma Prova de Amor ao Vivo	Zeca Pagodinho	Samba		
Inner World	Dori Caymmi	Samba		
Se For Pra Ser Feliz	Chitãozinho & Xororó	Música sertaneja		
Ao Vivo	Luan Santana	Música sertaneja		
Ao Vivo e em Cores em São Paulo	Victor & Leo	Música sertaneja		
En El Fin del Mundo	Chambao			
Legião Urbana e Paralamas Juntos	Legião Urbana / Os Paralamas do Sucesso	Punk rock, folk rock, ska		EMI
Bombay Bs. As.	34 Puñaladas	Tango		
Ensayos del Camarada Lacrasoft y Algunos Cómplices Metafísicos	34 Puñaladas	Pedro Mo		
Systema Solar	Systema Solar	Latin alternative, champeta		

== Best-selling records ==
=== Best-selling albums ===
The following is a list of the top 10 best-selling Latin albums in the United States in 2009, according to Billboard.

Rank	Album	Artist
1	The Last	Aventura
2	La Revolución	Wisin & Yandel
3	Palabras del Silencio	Luis Fonsi
4	Primera Fila	Vicente Fernández
5	Talento de Barrio	Daddy Yankee
6	Almas Gemelas	El Trono de México
7	Para Siempre	Vicente Fernández
8	La Mente Maestra	Nesty and Wisin & Yandel
9	5to Piso	Ricardo Arjona
10	El Patrón	Tito El Bambino

=== Best-performing songs ===
The following is a list of the top 10 best-performing Latin songs in the United States in 2009, according to Billboard.

Rank	Album	Artist
1	"Te Presumo"	Banda El Recodo
2	"El Amor"	Tito El Bambino
3	"Por Un Segundo"	Aventura
4	"Ya Es Muy Tarde"	La Arrolladora Banda El Limón
5	"No Me Doy Por Vencido"	Luis Fonsi
6	"Lo Intentamos"	Espinoza Paz
7	"Aquí Estoy Yo"	Luis Fonsi
8	"Espero"	Grupo Montez de Durango
9	"Loba"	Shakira
10	"Lloro Por Ti"	Enrique Iglesias

== Deaths ==
- January 13 – Pedro Aguilar, 81, Puerto Rican mambo dancer and choreographer
- January 20 – Ramón de Algeciras, 71, Spanish flamenco guitarist, composer and lyricist
- February 9 – Orlando "Cachaíto" López, 76, Cuban bassist (Buena Vista Social Club), complications from prostate surgery.
- February 15 – Joe Cuba, 77, American conga drummer, "Father of Latin Boogaloo"
- March 10 – *Ralph Mercado, 67, American music promoter (RMM Records & Video), cancer.
- March 12 – Quintín Cabrera, Uruguayan-Spanish singer and songwriter
- March 23:
  - Josep Solà, 78, Spanish composer
  - Roberto Villa, 24, Mexican drummer (Conjunto Atardecer)
- March 25 – Manny Oquendo, 78, American percussionist (Tito Puente, Tito Rodríguez), heart attack.
- April 1 – Pedro Infante, Jr., 59, Mexican singer
- April 2 – Rudy Ventura, 82, Spanish trumpet player and singer
- April 5 – Chano Lobato, Spanish singer
- April 6 – Mari Trini, 61, Spanish pop singer and actress.
- May 12 – Antonio Vega, 51, Spanish pop singer-songwriter (Nacha Pop), pneumonia.
- May 13 – Rafael Escalona, 81, Colombian Vallenato composer and troubador.
- May 18 – José Luis Caballero (singer), Mexican singer
- May 22 – Zé Rodrix, 61, Brazilian musician.
- June 1 – Silvio Barbato, 50, Italian-born Brazilian conductor and composer.
- July (unknown date) – Fransico Escamilla Chávez, guitarist and member of Los Dandys
- August 1 – Jesús Alberto Rey, Colombian composer
- August 16 – Carlos Ocaranza, Mexican singer
- August 20 – Manolo Torrente, Cuban singer
- September 11 – Julio Bovea, 75, Colombian singer and songwriter
- October 4 – Mercedes Sosa, 74, Argentinian folk singer, liver failure.
- November 7 – Carlos Lico, Mexican singer and songwriter
- December 25 – Norma Niurka, 67, Cuban journalist
