= Premio Lo Nuestro 2010 =

Latin Music awards show

22nd Lo Nuestro Awards
- Date: February 18, 2010
- Location: American Airlines Arena, Miami, FL
- Country: United States
- Hosted by: Ana Bárbara and Víctor Manuelle

Television/radio coverage
- Network: Univision

Premio Lo Nuestro 2010 was held on Thursday February 18, 2010 at the American Airlines Arena in Miami, FL was broadcast live on the Univision Network. The nominees were announced in December 2009 during a live televised morning show Despierta América! on Univision Network. This year marked the first time the awards are presented in High Definition.

== Performers ==
Presentations
| Artist | Song (s) |
|---|---|
| Chayanne | Medley (Opening Act) — 03:54 |
| Thalía | Medley (Opening Act) — 04:59 |
| Alejandro Fernández | Estuve (Opening Act) — 03:06 |
| Daddy Yankee | Descontrol |
| Banda el Recodo | Me Gusta Todo de Tí |
| Pee Wee | Quédate |
| David Bisbal | Mi Princesa |
| Jenni Rivera | Ya Lo Sé |
| Paulina Rubio | Ni Rosas Ni Juguetes |
| Tito El Bambino | Te Pido Perdón |
| Alejandro Fernández | Se Me Va la Voz (Special Performing: Career Achievement Award) — 06:39 |
| Aventura | Su Veneno & Dile al Amor |
| Espinoza Paz | Lo Intentamos |
| Chayanne | Me Enamore De Ti (Special Performing: Lifetime Achievement Award) |
| Paquita la del Barrio | Tu Ultima Parada & Rata de dos Patas — 04:56 |
| Luis Enrique | Yo No Sé Mañana |
| Cristian Castro and Ana Isabelle | Por Amarte Así |
| Nelly Furtado | Manos al Aire |
| Jorge Celedón, Hector "El Torito" Acosta & Jimmy Zambrano | Sin Perdon |
| Grupo Manía | Maria Lola |

== Presenters ==
- Natalia Jiménez
- William Levy
- Jacqueline Bracamontes
- Eiza González
- Franco "El Gorila"
- El Chapo de Sinaloa
- Luz Rios
- Carolina Tejera
- Arcángel
- Gloria Estefan
- Melina León
- Eddy Herrera
- Jose Luis Terrazas Jr.
- Fabian Muro
- Christian Chávez
- Carolina la O
- Marjorie de Sousa
- Gabriel Soto
- Lili Estefan
- Carlos & Alejandra
- Wisin & Yandel
- Don Francisco
- Miguel Galindo
- René Camacho
- Luis Fonsi
- Aleks Syntek
- Tati
- Diana Reyes
- Raúl González

== Special awards ==
=== Lifetime Achievement Award ===
- Chayanne

=== Special Career Achievement Award ===
- Alejandro Fernández

=== Young Artist Legacy Award ===
- Thalía

== Awards ==
=== General ===
| Categorie | Winner | Nominees |
|---|---|---|
| Premio Lo Nuestro Artist of the Year | Aventura | Flex; Luis Fonsi; Maná; Vicente Fernández |
| Collaboration of the Year | Luis Fonsi featuring Aleks Syntek, David Bisbal and Noel Schajris - "Aquí Estoy Yo" | Aventura featuring Akon and Wisin & Yandel - "All Up 2 You"; Calle 13 featuring Café Tacuba - "No Hay Nadie Como Tú"; Tommy Torres and Jesse & Joy - "Imparable" |

=== Pop ===
==== Album of the Year ====
- Ricardo Arjona — 5to Piso
- Fanny Lu — Dos
- Cristian Castro — El Culpable Soy Yo
- Paulina Rubio — Gran City Pop
- La 5ª Estación — Sin Frenos

==== Best Male Artist ====
- Cristian Castro
- Enrique Iglesias
- Luis Fonsi
- Ricardo Arjona
- Tommy Torres

==== Best Female Artist ====
- Fanny Lu
- Gloria Trevi
- Laura Pausini
- Nelly Furtado
- Paulina Rubio

==== Best Group or Duo ====
- Jesse & Joy
- La 5ª Estación
- Los Temerarios
- Playa Limbo
- Reik

==== Breakout Artist or Group of the Year ====
- Alexander Acha
- Nelly Furtado
- Sonohra
- Tati
- Victor & Leo

==== Song of the Year ====
- Luis Fonsi featuring Aleks Syntek, David Bisbal and Noel Schajris — "Aquí Estoy Yo"
- Playa Limbo — "Así Fue"
- Paulina Rubio — "Causa y Efecto"
- Ricardo Arjona — "Como Duele"
- La 5ª Estación — "Que te Quería"

=== Rock ===
==== Album of the Year ====
- La Secta AllStar — Fuego
- Los Fabulosos Cadillacs — La Luz del Ritmo
- Moderatto — Queremos Rock
- Zoé — Reptilectric

==== Artist of the Year ====
- Beto Cuevas
- Juanes
- La Secta AllStar
- Maná
- Motel

==== Song of the Year ====
- Los Rufianes — "Dame Tu Corazón"
- La Secta AllStar — "Déjalos Que Hablen"
- Beto Cuevas — "Hablame"
- Vivanativa — "Mariposa Mía"
- Los Fabulosos Cadillacs — "Should I Stay or Should I Go"

=== Tropical ===
==== Album of the Year ====
1. 15 Años de Corazon - Grupo Manía
2. Ciclos - Luis Enrique
3. El Mensaje - Rey Ruiz
4. La Introduccion - Carlos & Alejandra
5. The Last - Aventura

==== Best Male Artist ====
1. Domenic Marte
2. Fonseca
3. Gilberto Santa Rosa
4. Hector Acosta
5. Luis Enrique

==== Best Female Artist ====
1. Carolina la O
2. Marala
3. Melina León

==== Best Group or Duo ====
1. Adolescent's Orquesta
2. Aventura
3. Carlos & Alejandra
4. Grupo Manía
5. Jorge Celedón and Jimmy Zambrano

==== Soloist or Group Revelation of the Year ====
1. Carlos & Alejandra
2. Grupo Rush
3. Indio
4. Marcy Place
5. Rafely Rosario

==== Song of the Year ====
1. "Eres Asi" - Domenic Marte
2. "Llego el Amor" - Gilberto Santa Rosa
3. "Marialola" - Grupo Manía
4. "Por Un Segundo" - Aventura
5. "Yo No Sé Mañana" - Luis Enrique

==== Merengue Artist of the Year ====
1. Eddy Herrera
2. Elvis Crespo
3. Grupo Manía
4. Juan Luis Guerra
5. Rafely Rosario

==== Tropical Salsa Artist of the Year ====
1. Adolescent's Orquesta
2. Charlie Cruz
3. Gilberto Santa Rosa
4. Jerry Rivera
5. Luis Enrique

==== Tropical Traditional Artist of the Year ====
1. Aventura
2. Domenic Marte
3. Fonseca
4. Hector Acosta
5. Jorge Celedón and Jimmy Zambrano

=== Regional Mexican Music ===
==== Album of the Year ====
1. Más Adelante - La Arrolladora Banda El Limón
2. Nosotros Somos - Montéz de Durango
3. Para Siempre - El Chapo de Sinaloa
4. Sólo Contigo - Pesado
5. Te Presumo - Banda el Recodo

==== Male Artist of the Year ====
1. El Chapo de Sinaloa
2. Espinoza Paz
3. Germán Montero
4. Marco Antonio Solís
5. Vicente Fernández

==== Female Artist of the Year ====
1. Alicia Villarreal
2. Diana Reyes
3. Jenni Rivera
4. Luz Rios
5. Paquita la del Barrio

==== Group or Duo of the Year ====
1. Alacranes Musical
2. Banda el Recodo
3. Dareyes de la Sierra
4. Montéz de Durango
5. La Arrolladora Banda El Limón

==== Song of the Year ====
1. "El Último Beso" - Vicente Fernández
2. "Lo Intentamos" - Espinoza Paz
3. "Quiéreme Más" - Patrulla 81
4. "Te Presumo" - Banda el Recodo
5. "Ya Es Muy Tarde" - La Arrolladora Banda El Limón

==== Duranguense Artist of the Year ====
1. Alacranes Musical
2. El Trono de México
3. Montéz de Durango
4. K-Paz de la Sierra
5. Patrulla 81

==== Banda of the Year ====
1. Banda el Recodo
2. Dareyes de la Sierra
3. El Chapo de Sinaloa
4. Espinoza Paz
5. La Arrolladora Banda El Limón

==== Norteño Artist of the Year ====
1. Conjunto Primavera
2. Intocable
3. Los Inquietos del Norte
4. Los Tucanes de Tijuana
5. Pesado

==== Grupera Artist of the Year ====
1. Control
2. Huichol Musical
3. La Nobleza de Aguililla
4. Los Pikadientes de Caborca
5. Marco Antonio Solís

==== Ranchera Artist of the Year ====
1. Diego Verdaguer
2. Pedro Fernández
3. Pepe Aguilar
4. Vicente Fernández

=== Urban ===
==== Album of the Year ====
1. Down to Earth - Alexis & Fido
2. El Patrón - Tito El Bambino
3. La Evolución Romantic Style - Flex
4. Te Amo - Makano
5. Wisin & Yandel Presentan: La Mente Maestra - DJ Nesty (featuring Wisin & Yandel)

==== Artist of the Year ====
1. Daddy Yankee
2. Flex
3. R.K.M & Ken-Y
4. Tito El Bambino
5. Wisin & Yandel

==== Revelation of the Year ====
1. Arcángel
2. De La Ghetto
3. Franco "El Gorila"
4. Makano
5. Yomo

==== Song of the Year ====
1. "All Up 2 You" - Aventura (featuring Akon & Wisin & Yandel)
2. "Dime Si Te Vas Con Él" - Flex
3. "El Amor" - Tito El Bambino
4. "Me Estás Tentando" - Wisin & Yandel
5. "¿Qué Tengo Que Hacer?" - Daddy Yankee

=== Video ===
==== Video of the Year ====
1. La Perla - Calle 13 (featuring Rubén Blades)
2. Esclavo de Sus Besos - David Bisbal
3. Recuérdame - La 5ª Estación (featuring Marc Anthony)
4. Loco Por Ti - Los Temerarios
5. Cumbayá - Pee Wee
6. Loba - Shakira
