= Cerrando Ciclos =

2024–2025 concert tour by Aventura

- Tour by Aventura
- Start date: May 1, 2024
- End date: January 5, 2025
- Legs: 4
- No. of shows: 111
- Attendance: 910,000
- Box office: US $134.7 million

Aventura concert chronology
- Inmortal Tour (2020–2021); Cerrando Ciclos (2024-2025)

Cerrando Ciclos (Spanish for 'closing cycles') was a reunion concert tour by Dominican-American bachata group Aventura. It is considered to be their final tour as it is being reported that the band will officially retire this year. The tour started on May 1, 2024, at the Golden 1 Center in Sacramento, California, United States, and it ended on January 5, 2025, at Félix Sánchez Olympic Stadium in Santo Domingo, Dominican Republic.

Promoted as their ultimate tour together, it's the band first since their 2020–21 Inmortal Tour. It has received positive reviews by critics and fans alike. The tour was a box office success with several shows added in some cities due the high demand. As of December 2024, the tour grossed over US$134.7 million, selling over 910,000 tickets on 66 shows becoming Aventura's highest-grossing tour ever. It was also ranked 9th on the highest-grossing Latin tours in Billboard Boxscore History. With Cerrando Ciclos, Aventura broke severial records including the fastest ticket sales ever (3 shows in 10 hours) and the only act to sold out three and four consecutive shows at Estadio Olimpico Felix Sanchez in Santo Domingo.

== Background ==
On February 5, 2020 Aventura kick off Inmortal Tour, their first tour together on 10 years. However, due the COVID-19 pandemic the shows were cancelled. On Summer 2021, the tour was renamed as Inmortal Stadium Tour and visited Miami, Chicago, Los Angeles and East Rutherford. The tour ended on December 18–19 with two sold-out shows at Félix Sánchez Olympic Stadium in Santo Domingo, Dominican Republic. Following the end of the tour, the member of the band focused on their individual proyects.

The lead singer, Romeo Santos released his fifth studio album Formula Vol. 3 in September 2022 and promoted the album with Formula Vol 3: La Gira (2023) the following year which was raked at the top 10 Highest-Grossing Latin Tours in Billboard Boxscore History with US$106.1 million.

On February 26, 2024, the band post on social media a teaser of an upcoming proyect, causing speculation on the fans. The following day it's was announced that Aventura last reunion tour titled Cerrando Ciclos ('closing cycles') with 20 shows in the United States. The lead singer Romeo Santos explained "This year there is something that I must do and conclude,” Santos said in a statement. “I want you to join me on a day where I will be definitively closing cycles.”

On April 2, 2024, the band released the single "Brindo Con Agua" with Henry Santos on the lead vocals and served as the follow up of "Hermanita (2003)". It was their first single together in five years since "Inmortal" in 2019. In April 2024, a European Leg was announced marking the first concerts in the continent in 17 years. In May 2024, the Latin American shows were announced.

== Set list ==
1. "Por Un Segundo"
2. "Mi Niña Cambió"
3. "El Desprecio"
4. "La Boda"
5. "Los Infieles"
6. "Llorar"
7. "Dile al Amor"
8. "Angelito"
9. "Enséñame a Olvidar"
10. "Te Invito"
11. "9:15 (Nueve & Quince)"
12. "Todavia Me Amas"
13. "Brindo Con Agua"
14. "El Malo"
15. "El Perdedor"
16. "Mi Corazoncito"
17. "Su Veneno"
18. "Mujeriego"
19. "Amor de Madre"
20. "La Película"
21. "La Tormenta"
22. "Volvió La Traicionera"
23. "Our Song"
24. "Hermanita"
25. "Déjà Vu"
26. "Yo Quisiera Amarla"
27. "Tu Jueguito"
28. "Trampa de Amor"
29. "Un Poeta Enamorado"
30. "Amor Bonito"
31. "No lo perdona Dios"
32. "Cuando Volverás"
33. "Alexandra"
34. "Volví"
35. "Obsesión"

== Tour dates ==
List of 2024-2025 concerts
Date	City	Country	Venue		Attendance	Revenue
May 1, 2024	Sacramento	United States	Golden 1 Center			—N/a
May 2, 2024	San Jose	United States	SAP Center			—N/a
May 4, 2024	Los Angeles	United States	Crypto.com Arena			—N/a
May 5, 2024	Los Angeles	United States	Crypto.com Arena			—N/a
May 7, 2024	Ontario	United States	Toyota Arena			—N/a
May 8, 2024	Ontario	United States	Toyota Arena			—N/a
May 9, 2024	Glendale	United States	Desert Diamond Arena			—N/a
May 11, 2024	Houston	United States	Toyota Center			—N/a
May 12, 2024	Houston	United States	Toyota Center			—N/a
May 15, 2024	Charlotte	United States	Spectrum Center			—N/a
May 16, 2024	Charlotte	United States	Spectrum Center			—N/a
May 18, 2024	Milwaukee	United States	Fiserv Forum			—N/a
May 19, 2024	Rosemont (Note: Billed as Chicago in promotional material.)	United States	Allstate Arena			—N/a
May 20, 2024	Rosemont	United States	Allstate Arena			—N/a
May 23, 2024	New York City	United States	Madison Square Garden			—N/a
May 25, 2024	Washington D.C.	United States	Capital One Arena			—N/a
May 26, 2024	Washington D.C.	United States	Capital One Arena			—N/a
May 27, 2024	Hartford	United States	XL Center			—N/a
May 30, 2024	New York City (Note: Billed as Brooklyn in promotional material.)	United States	Barclays Center			—N/a
May 31, 2024	Reading	United States	Santander Arena			—N/a
June 1, 2024	Reading	United States	Santander Arena			—N/a
June 2, 2024	Newark	United States	Prudential Center			—N/a
June 3, 2024	Newark	United States	Prudential Center			—N/a
June 4, 2024	Newark	United States	Prudential Center			—N/a
June 5, 2024	Elmont (Note: Billed as Long Island in promotional material.)	United States	UBS Arena			—N/a
June 7, 2024	Toronto	Canada	Scotiabank Arena			—N/a
June 8, 2024	Montreal	Canada	Bell Centre			—N/a
June 11, 2024	Elmont	United States	UBS Arena			—N/a
June 12, 2024	Washington, D.C.	United States	Capital One Arena			—N/a
June 14, 2024	Orlando	United States	Kia Center			—N/a
June 15, 2024	Orlando	United States	Kia Center			—N/a
June 16, 2024	Atlanta	United States	State Farm Arena			—N/a
June 17, 2024	Atlanta	United States	State Farm Arena			—N/a
June 19, 2024	San Antonio	United States	Frost Bank Center			—N/a
June 21, 2024	Dallas	United States	American Airlines Center			—N/a
June 22, 2024	Dallas	United States	American Airlines Center			—N/a
June 25, 2024	Miami	United States	Kaseya Center			—N/a
June 26, 2024	Miami	United States	Kaseya Center			—N/a
June 28, 2024	Nashville	United States	Bridgestone Arena			—N/a
June 30, 2024	New York City	United States	Madison Square Garden			—N/a
July 3, 2024	Boston	United States	TD Garden			—N/a
July 5, 2024	Boston	United States	TD Garden			—N/a
July 6, 2024	Boston	United States	TD Garden			—N/a
July 8, 2024	Indianapolis	United States	Gainbridge Fieldhouse			—N/a
July 10, 2024	Denver	United States	Ball Arena			—N/a
July 11, 2024	Denver	United States	Ball Arena			—N/a
July 13, 2024	Chicago	United States	Allstate Arena			—N/a
July 17, 2024	Seattle	United States	Climate Pledge Arena			—N/a
July 18, 2024	Portland	United States	Moda Center			—N/a
July 20, 2024	Salt Lake City	United States	Delta Center			—N/a
July 23, 2024	Oakland	United States	Oakland Arena			—N/a
July 26, 2024	Anaheim	United States	Honda Center			—N/a
July 27, 2024	Paradise (Note: Billed as Las Vegas in promotional material.)	United States	T-Mobile Arena			—N/a
July 29, 2024	Phoenix	United States	Footprint Center			—N/a
July 30, 2024	El Paso	United States	El Paso County Coliseum			—N/a
August 1, 2024	Oklahoma City	United States	Paycom Center			—N/a
August 3, 2024	Hidalgo	United States	Payne Arena			—N/a
August 12, 2024	Mexico City	Mexico	Arena Ciudad de Mexico	22.048/22.048		—N/a
August 13, 2024	Mexico City	Mexico	Arena Ciudad de Mexico	22.048/22.048		—N/a
August 14, 2024	Guadalajara	Mexico	Estadio Akron			—N/a
August 16, 2024	Querétaro	Mexico	Estadio Corregidora			—N/a
August 18, 2024	Mexico City	Mexico	Arena Ciudad de Mexico			—N/a
August 20, 2024	Monterrey	Mexico	Estadio Banorte			—N/a
August 23, 2024	Puebla	Mexico	Centro Expositor Los Fuertes			—N/a
August 25, 2024	Mérida	Mexico	Estadio Carlos Iturralde			—N/a
August 31, 2024	Málaga	Spain	Marenostrum Fuengirola	—N/a	—N/a	
September 5, 2024	Barcelona	Spain	Palau Sant Jordi	—N/a	—N/a	
September 6, 2024	Barcelona	Spain	Palau Sant Jordi	—N/a	—N/a	
September 7, 2024	Madrid	Spain	Santiago Bernabéu Stadium	—N/a	—N/a	
September 8, 2024	Madrid	Spain	Santiago Bernabéu Stadium	—N/a	—N/a	
September 13, 2024	Tenerife	Spain	Port of Santa Cruz de Tenerife	—N/a	—N/a	
September 15, 2024	Valencia	Spain	Marina Sur	—N/a	—N/a	
September 21, 2024	Amsterdam	Netherlands	Ziggo Dome	—N/a	—N/a	
September 22, 2024	London	England	The O2 Arena	—N/a	—N/a	
September 23, 2024	Paris	France	Accor Arena	—N/a	—N/a	
September 25, 2024	Zürich	Switzerland	Hallenstadion	—N/a	—N/a	
September 26, 2024	Zürich	Switzerland	Hallenstadion	—N/a	—N/a	
September 28, 2024	Milan	Italy	Hippodrome of San Siro	—N/a	—N/a	
October 3, 2024	Panama City	Panama	Estadio Rod Carew	—N/a	—N/a	
October 5, 2024	San Jose	Costa Rica	Estadio Nacional	—N/a	—N/a	
October 8, 2024	San Juan	Puerto Rico	Coliseo de Puerto Rico	—N/a	—N/a	
October 9, 2024	San Juan	Puerto Rico	Coliseo de Puerto Rico	—N/a	—N/a	
October 10, 2024	San Juan	Puerto Rico	Coliseo de Puerto Rico	—N/a	—N/a	
October 11, 2024	San Juan	Puerto Rico	Coliseo de Puerto Rico	—N/a	—N/a	
October 12, 2024	San Juan	Puerto Rico	Coliseo de Puerto Rico	—N/a	—N/a	
October 13, 2024	San Juan	Puerto Rico	Coliseo de Puerto Rico	—N/a	—N/a	
October 16, 2024	Lima	Peru	Estadio Nacional	—N/a	—N/a	
October 17, 2024	Lima	Peru	Estadio Nacional	—N/a	—N/a	
October 19, 2024	Quito	Ecuador	Estadio Olímpico Atahualpa	—N/a	—N/a	
October 20, 2024	Quito	Ecuador	Estadio Olímpico Atahualpa	—N/a	—N/a	
October 23, 2024	Buenos Aires	Argentina	José Amalfitani Stadium	—N/a	—N/a	
October 24, 2024	Buenos Aires	Argentina	José Amalfitani Stadium	—N/a	—N/a	
October 26, 2024	Montevideo	Uruguay	Estadio Centenario	—N/a	—N/a	
October 29, 2024	Santiago	Chile	Estadio Nacional	—N/a	—N/a	
October 30, 2024	Santiago	Chile	Estadio Nacional	—N/a	—N/a	
November 2, 2024 (Note: Date changed. Before the concert would be on november 14.)	San Pedro Sula	Honduras	Estadio Olímpico Metropolitano	—N/a	—N/a	
November 5, 2024	Managua	Nicaragua	Estadio Nacional Soberanía	—N/a	—N/a	
November 7, 2024	Guatemala City	Guatemala	Estadio Cementos Progreso	—N/a	—N/a	
November 9, 2024	San Salvador	El Salvador	Estadio Jorge "El Mágico" González	—N/a	—N/a	
December 6, 2024	Elmont	United States	UBS Arena	—N/a	—N/a	
December 11, 2024	New Jersey	United States	Prudential Center	—N/a	—N/a	
December 12, 2024	Brooklyn	United States	Barclays Center	—N/a	—N/a	
December 14, 2024	Bogota	Colombia	Estadio el Campin	—N/a	—N/a	
December 15, 2024	Bogota	Colombia	Estadio el Campin	—N/a	—N/a	
December 18, 2024	Guayaquil	Ecuador	Estadio Modelo Alberto Spencer	—N/a	—N/a	
December 20, 2024	Medellin	Colombia	Estadio Atanasio Girardot	—N/a	—N/a	
December 21, 2024	Cali	Colombia	Estadio Olímpico Pascual Guerrero	—N/a	—N/a	
December 27, 2024	Santo Domingo	Dominican Republic	Estadio Olímpico Félix Sánchez	—N/a	—N/a	
December 28, 2024	Santo Domingo	Dominican Republic	Estadio Olímpico Félix Sánchez	—N/a	—N/a	
December 29, 2024	Santo Domingo	Dominican Republic	Estadio Olímpico Félix Sánchez	—N/a	—N/a	
January 5, 2025	Santo Domingo	Dominican Republic	Estadio Olímpico Félix Sánchez	—N/a	—N/a	

== Cancelled shows ==
List of cancelled concerts, showing date, city, country, venue, and reason for cancellation
Date	City	Country	Venue	Reason
August 18, 2024	Mexico City	Mexico	Campo Marte	Unknown
November 2, 2024	Caracas	Venezuela	Estadio Monumental Simon Bolivar	Concerns about Political and Social inestability
