= List of number-one Billboard Hot Tropical Songs of 2009 =

The Billboard Tropical Songs is a chart that ranks the best-performing tropical songs of the United States. Published by Billboard magazine, the data are compiled by Nielsen Broadcast Data Systems based on each single's weekly airplay.

== Chart history ==
Issue date	Song	Artist(s)	Reference(s)
January 3	"Te Regalo Amores"	R.K.M. & Ken-Y	
January 10	"Por un Segundo"	Aventura	
January 17	"Por un Segundo"	Aventura	
January 24	"Por un Segundo"	Aventura	
January 31	"Por un Segundo"	Aventura	
February 7	"Por un Segundo"	Aventura	
February 14	"Por un Segundo"	Aventura	
February 21	"Por un Segundo"	Aventura	
February 28	"Por un Segundo"	Aventura	
March 7	"Por un Segundo"	Aventura	
March 14	"Me Estás Tentando"	Wisin & Yandel featuring DJ Nesty	
March 21	"Me Estás Tentando"	Wisin & Yandel featuring DJ Nesty	
March 28	"Por un Segundo"	Aventura	
April 4	"Por un Segundo"	Aventura	
April 11	"Por un Segundo"	Aventura	
April 18	"El Amor"	Tito El Bambino	
April 25	"El Amor"	Tito El Bambino	
May 2	"El Amor"	Tito El Bambino	
May 8	"Llego el Amor"	Gilberto Santa Rosa	
May 16	"El Amor"	Tito El Bambino	
May 23	"Te Amo"	Makano	
May 30	"Te Amo"	Makano	
June 6	"Yo No Sé Mañana"	Luis Enrique	
June 13	"Yo No Sé Mañana"	Luis Enrique	
June 20	"Yo No Sé Mañana"	Luis Enrique	
June 27	"Yo No Sé Mañana"	Luis Enrique	
July 4	"Yo No Sé Mañana"	Luis Enrique	
July 11	"Yo No Sé Mañana"	Luis Enrique	
July 18	"Yo No Sé Mañana"	Luis Enrique	
July 25	"Yo No Sé Mañana"	Luis Enrique	
August 1	"Abusadora"	Wisin & Yandel	
August 8	"Yo No Sé Mañana"	Luis Enrique	
August 15	"Yo No Sé Mañana"	Luis Enrique	
August 22	"Yo No Sé Mañana"	Luis Enrique	
August 29	"Hagamoslo Aunque Duela"	Marlon Fernández	
September 5	"Manos al Aire"	Nelly Furtado	
September 12	"Manos al Aire"	Nelly Furtado	
September 19	"Manos al Aire"	Nelly Furtado	
September 26	"Loba"	Shakira	
October 3	"Hagamoslo Aunque Duela"	Marlon Fernández	
October 10	"Loba"	Shakira	
October 17	"Su Veneno"	Aventura	
October 24	"Su Veneno"	Aventura	
October 31	"Su Veneno"	Aventura	
November 7	"Su Veneno"	Aventura	
November 14	"Looking for Paradise"	Alejandro Sanz featuring Alicia Keys	
November 21	"Looking for Paradise"	Alejandro Sanz featuring Alicia Keys	
November 28	"Su Veneno"	Aventura	
December 5	"Mi Cama Huele A Ti"	Tito El Bambino featuring Zion & Lennox	
December 12	"Mi Cama Huele A Ti"	Tito El Bambino featuring Zion & Lennox	
December 19	"Gracias A Tí"	Wisin & Yandel featuring Enrique Iglesias	
December 26	"Mirame"	Víctor Manuelle	

== See also ==
- List of number-one Billboard Hot Latin Songs of 2009
- List of number-one Billboard Hot Latin Pop Airplay of 2009
