= List of Billboard Latin Rhythm Airplay number ones of 2009 =

The Billboard Latin Rhythm Airplay is a chart that ranks the most-played songs on Latin rhythm radio stations. Published by Billboard magazine, the data are compiled by Nielsen SoundScan based collectively on each single's weekly airplay.

== Chart history ==
Key
†	Indicates number 1 on Billboard's year-end Latin rhythm chart

Issue date	Song	Artist(s)	Ref.
January 3	"Te Regalo Amores"	R.K.M & Ken-Y	
January 10	"Por un Segundo"	Aventura	
January 17	"Por un Segundo"	Aventura	
January 24	"Virtual Diva"	Don Omar	
January 31	"Me Estás Tentando" †	Wisin & Yandel	
February 7	"Me Estás Tentando" †	Wisin & Yandel	
February 14	"Me Estás Tentando" †	Wisin & Yandel	
February 21	"Me Estás Tentando" †	Wisin & Yandel	
February 28	"Me Estás Tentando" †	Wisin & Yandel	
March 7	"Me Estás Tentando" †	Wisin & Yandel	
March 14	"Me Estás Tentando" †	Wisin & Yandel	
March 21	"Me Estás Tentando" †	Wisin & Yandel	
March 28	"Me Estás Tentando" †	Wisin & Yandel	
April 4	"Me Estás Tentando" †	Wisin & Yandel	
April 11	"Me Estás Tentando" †	Wisin & Yandel	
April 18	"El Amor"	Tito el Bambino	
April 25	"El Amor"	Tito el Bambino	
May 2	"El Amor"	Tito el Bambino	
May 9	"El Amor"	Tito el Bambino	
May 16	"El Amor"	Tito el Bambino	
May 23	"El Amor"	Tito el Bambino	
May 30	"El Amor"	Tito el Bambino	
June 6	"El Amor"	Tito el Bambino	
June 13	"El Amor"	Tito el Bambino	
June 20	"El Amor"	Tito el Bambino	
June 27	"El Amor"	Tito el Bambino	
July 4	"All Up 2 You"	Aventura featuring Akon and Wisin & Yandel	
July 11	"All Up 2 You"	Aventura featuring Akon and Wisin & Yandel	
July 18	"Abusadora"	Wisin & Yandel	
July 25	"Abusadora"	Wisin & Yandel	
August 1	"Abusadora"	Wisin & Yandel	
August 8	"Abusadora"	Wisin & Yandel	
August 15	"Abusadora"	Wisin & Yandel	
August 22	"Abusadora"	Wisin & Yandel	
August 29	"Abusadora"	Wisin & Yandel	
September 5	"Manos al Aire"	Nelly Furtado	
September 12	"El Amor"	Tito el Bambino	
September 19	"Manos al Aire"	Nelly Furtado	
September 26	"Manos al Aire"	Nelly Furtado	
October 3	"Manos al Aire"	Nelly Furtado	
October 10	"Mi Cama Huele a Ti"	Tito el Bambino featuring Zion & Lennox	
October 17	"Mi Cama Huele a Ti"	Tito el Bambino featuring Zion & Lennox	
October 24	"Su Veneno"	Aventura	
October 31	"Su Veneno"	Aventura	
November 7	"Mi Cama Huele a Ti"	Tito el Bambino featuring Zion & Lennox	
November 14	"Esclavo de Sus Besos"	David Bisbal	
November 21	"Mi Cama Huele a Ti"	Tito el Bambino featuring Zion & Lennox	
November 28	"Mi Cama Huele a Ti"	Tito el Bambino featuring Zion & Lennox	
December 5	"Mi Cama Huele a Ti"	Tito el Bambino featuring Zion & Lennox	
December 12	"Gracias a Ti"	Wisin & Yandel featuring Enrique Iglesias	
December 19	"Gracias a Ti"	Wisin & Yandel featuring Enrique Iglesias	
December 26	"Hasta Abajo "	Don Omar	

== See also ==
- List of number-one Billboard Hot Latin Songs of 2009
