= El Amor (Tito El Bambino song) =

Single by Tito El Bambino

from the album El Patrón
- Released: February 9, 2009
- Recorded: 2009
- Genre: Latin pop; cumbia; merengue
- Length: 4:07
- Label: Siente
- Songwriters: Efraín Fines; Joan Ortiz
- Producer: Nérol

Tito El Bambino singles chronology
"Under" (2008)	"El Amor" (2009)	"Mi Cama Huele a Ti" (2009)

Audio sample
- A 26-second sample of "El Amor" featuring part of the chorus.: file; help

"El Amor" (English: "Love") is a song by Puerto Rican singer Tito El Bambino. It was written by Tito and Joan Ortiz and released on February 9, 2009, as the second single from his third studio album, El Patrón (2009). The song blends the sounds of Latin pop with cumbia and merengue. A regional Mexican and a salsa version were recorded and included on the special edition of the album.

The song became a huge success in the United States reaching number one on both the Billboard Top Latin Songs chart and Billboard Tropical Songs chart. It also charted in Brazil and Venezuela. It also received several awards and nominations at various award shows between 2009 and 2010.

== Recording and composition ==
"El Amor" was written by Tito and Joan Ortiz, produced by Nérol, and arranged by Roberto Cora. Lyrically, the song speaks about the appreciation of love even if it blinds a person. Musically, the song combines the sounds of Latin pop and cumbia. In addition to the original track, Tito re-recorded the song with Jenni Rivera, La India, and Yolandita Monge separately. For his recording with La India, the song was recorded in salsa. Tito's duets with India and Rivera were included on the special edition of the album, El Patrón: La Victoría.

== Release and chart performance ==
The song was released on February 9, 2009, on radio stations in the United States and across Latin America by Siente Music, a subdivision of Universal Music Latin Entertainment and Venemusic. A music video was made to promote the single. The salsa version with La India was released digitally on August 31, 2009, as a single. On the Billboard Radio Songs chart, the song debuted at number 73 on the week of May 16, 2009 and peaked at number 72 on the week of June 6, 2009. On the Billboard Hot Latin Songs chart, the song debuted at number 49 on the week of February 28, 2009. It reached number one for the week of May 16, 2009, replacing "Tú No Eres Para Mi" by Fanny Lu and later succeeded by Makano for "Te Amo". On the Billboard Latin Pop Songs chart, the song debuted at number 39 on the week of March 14, 2009 and peaked at number three on the week of May 30, 2009. On the Billboard Tropical Songs chart, the song debuted at number 17 on the week of February 28, 2009. It reached number one for the week of April 18, 2009, replacing "Por un Segundo" by Aventura, and later succeeded by Gilberto Santa Rosa for "Llegó El Amor". On the Billboard Latin Rhythm Airplay chart, the song debuted at number 14 on the week of February 28, 2009. It reached number one for the week of April 18, 2009 replacing "Me Estás Tentando" by Wisin & Yandel featuring Nesty "La Mente Maestra" and was later succeeded by Aventura featuring Akon and Wisin & Yandel for "All Up 2 You". "El Amor" ended 2009 as the second-best performing song of the year. Outside of the United States, the song was successful in Mexico and Venezuela becoming a top-10 hit in both countries.

== Critical reception ==
On the review for the album, Jason Birchmeier of AllMusic considered the song to be the most stylistic experiment and primary highlight. He called it a heart-warming cumbia and said that it showcases Tito's singing ability. Birchmeier went on to say that it was "curious that "El Amor" is sequenced first, given how uncharacteristic it is of both Tito and El Patrón, yet it's the most sure-fire hit and gets the album off to a surprising start". Tijana Ilich of About.com commented that the single is the most popular from his album El Patron seems to be "El Amor" and that the song was a pure, sentimental pop cumbia.

== Accolades ==
At the 10th Annual Latin Grammy Awards, "El Amor" received a nomination for Best Tropical Song which was awarded to Luis Enrique for "Yo No Sé Mañana". At the Lo Nuestro Awards of 2010, the song received an award for Urban Song of the Year. At the Billboard Latin Music Awards of 2010, "El Amor" won four awards including Hot Latin Song of the Year, Latin Rhythm Airplay Song of the Year, and Latin Digital Download of the Year. The song also received three nominations for Latin Pop Airplay Song of the Year, Tropical Airplay Song of the Year, and Latin Master Ringtone of the Year. At the 2010 Juventud Awards, the song was awarded My Ringtone and a nomination for Catchiest Tune which was awarded to Aventura for "Dile al Amor". At the American Society of Composers, Authors and Publishers Awards of 2010, "El Amor" was named Latin Song of the Year.

== Track listing ==
US CD single

1. "El Amor" (album version) – 4:06
2. "El Amor" (instrumental) – 4:07

Official remixes

1. "El Amor" – (regional Mexican version) (featuring Jenni Rivera) – 4:08
2. "El Amor" – (salsa version) (featuring La India) – 4:16

== Charts ==
=== Weekly charts ===
Chart (2009)	Position
Chile (EFE)	9
Chilean Airplay (Los 40)	1
Colombia (EFE)	1
El Salvador(EFE)	2
Honduras (EFE)	1
Mexico (Monitor Latino)	10
US Radio Songs (Billboard)	79
US Hot Latin Songs (Billboard)	1
US Latin Pop Airplay (Billboard)	3
US Tropical Songs (Billboard)	1
US Latin Rhythm Songs (Billboard)	1
Venezuela Top 100 (Record Report)	9

=== Year-end charts ===
Chart (2009)	Position
US Latin Songs (Billboard)	2
US Latin Pop Songs (Billboard)	6
US Tropical Songs (Billboard)	5
US Latin Rhythm Songs (Billboard)	2

== See also ==
- Billboard Hot Latin Songs Year-End Chart
- List of number-one Billboard Hot Latin Songs of 2009
- List of number-one Billboard Hot Tropical Songs of 2009
- List of Billboard Latin Rhythm Airplay number ones of 2009
