= List of number-one Billboard Top Latin Albums of 2009 =

The Billboard Top Latin albums chart, published in Billboard magazine, is a record chart that features Latin music sales information. This data are compiled by Nielsen SoundScan from a sample that includes music stores, music departments at electronics and department stores, Internet sales (both physical and digital) and verifiable sales from concert venues in the United States.

== Albums ==
Chart date	Album	Artist	Reference
January 3	Primera Fila (Front row)	Vicente Fernández	
January 10	Primera Fila (Front row)	Vicente Fernández	
January 17	Primera Fila (Front row)	Vicente Fernández	
January 24	Primera Fila (Front row)	Vicente Fernández	
January 31	Primera Fila (Front row)	Vicente Fernández	
February 7	Para Siempre (Forever)	Vicente Fernández	
February 14	Necesito Más de Tí (I Need More From You)	Duelo	
February 21	Necesito Más de Tí (I Need More From You)	Duelo	
February 28	Para Siempre	Vicente Fernández	
March 7	Quiéreme Más (Love Me More)	Patrulla 81	
March 14	Quiéreme Más (Love Me More)	Patrulla 81	
March 21	Quiéreme Más (Love Me More)	Patrulla 81	
March 28	Quiéreme Más (Love Me More)	Patrulla 81	
April 4	Sin Frenos (Without Brakes)	La Quinta Estación	
April 11	Más Adelante (More Ahead)	La Arrolladora Banda El Limón	
April 18	Más Adelante (More Ahead)	La Arrolladora Banda El Limón	
April 25	Más Adelante (More Ahead)	La Arrolladora Banda El Limón	
May 2	Más Adelante (More Ahead)	La Arrolladora Banda El Limón	
May 9	El Patrón (The Boss)	Tito "El Bambino"	
May 16	IDon	Don Omar	
May 23	IDon	Don Omar	
May 30	IDon	Don Omar	
June 6	Yo No Canto, Pero lo Intentamos (I Don't Sing, But I Try)	Espinoza Paz	
June 13	La Revolución (The Revolution)	Wisin & Yandel	
June 20	La Revolución (The Revolution)	Wisin & Yandel	
June 27	The Last	Aventura	
July 4	The Last	Aventura	
July 11	The Last	Aventura	
July 18	The Last	Aventura	
July 25	The Last	Aventura	
August 1	The Last	Aventura	
August 8	The Last	Aventura	
August 15	The Last	Aventura	
August 22	The Last	Aventura	
August 29	The Last	Aventura	
September 5	The Last	Aventura	
September 12	The Last	Aventura	
September 19	The Last	Aventura	
September 26	La Granja	Los Tigres del Norte	
October 3	Mi Plan	Nelly Furtado	
October 10	La Granja	Los Tigres del Norte	
October 17	La Granja	Los Tigres del Norte	
October 24	The Last	Aventura	
October 31	The Last	Aventura	
November 7	Sin Mirar Atrás	David Bisbal	
November 14	Soy	Ednita Nazario	
November 21	Soy	Ednita Nazario	
November 28	Paraíso Express	Alejandro Sanz	
December 5	The Last	Aventura	
December 12	La Revolución	Wisin & Yandel	
December 19	Mi Navidad	Andrea Bocelli	
December 26	The Last	Aventura	
