= List of number-one Billboard Latin Pop Airplay songs of 2009 =

The Billboard Latin Pop Airplay chart ranks the best-performing Spanish-language pop music singles in the United States. Published by Billboard, the data are compiled by Nielsen SoundScan based collectively on each single's weekly airplay based on audience impressions.

== Chart history ==
Issue date	Song	Artist(s)	Ref.
January 3	"No Me Doy Por Vencido"	Luis Fonsi	
January 10	"No Me Doy Por Vencido"	Luis Fonsi	
January 17	"No Me Doy Por Vencido"	Luis Fonsi	
January 24	"No Me Doy Por Vencido"	Luis Fonsi	
January 31	"No Me Doy Por Vencido"	Luis Fonsi	
February 7	"No Me Doy Por Vencido"	Luis Fonsi	
February 14	"No Me Doy Por Vencido"	Luis Fonsi	
February 21	"No Me Doy Por Vencido"	Luis Fonsi	
February 28	"No Me Doy Por Vencido"	Luis Fonsi	
March 7	"No Me Doy Por Vencido"	Luis Fonsi	
March 14	"No Me Doy Por Vencido"	Luis Fonsi	
March 21	"Aquí Estoy Yo"	Luis Fonsi featuring Aleks Syntek, David Bisbal, and Noel Schajris	
March 28	"No Me Doy Por Vencido"	Luis Fonsi	
April 4	"No Me Doy Por Vencido"	Luis Fonsi	
April 11	"Aquí Estoy Yo"	Luis Fonsi featuring Aleks Syntek, David Bisbal, and Noel Schajris	
April 18	"Aquí Estoy Yo"	Luis Fonsi featuring Aleks Syntek, David Bisbal, and Noel Schajris	
April 25	"Tú No Eres Para Mi"	Fanny Lú	
May 2	"Tú No Eres Para Mi"	Fanny Lú	
May 9	"Tú No Eres Para Mi"	Fanny Lú	
May 16	"Que te Quería"	La 5ª Estación	
May 23	"Que te Quería"	La 5ª Estación	
May 30	"Que te Quería"	La 5ª Estación	
June 6	"Aquí Estoy Yo"	Luis Fonsi featuring Aleks Syntek, David Bisbal, and Noel Schajris	
June 13	"Aquí Estoy Yo"	Luis Fonsi featuring Aleks Syntek, David Bisbal, and Noel Schajris	
June 20	"Aquí Estoy Yo"	Luis Fonsi featuring Aleks Syntek, David Bisbal, and Noel Schajris	
June 27	"Causa Y Efecto"	Paulina Rubio	
July 4	"Causa Y Efecto"	Paulina Rubio	
July 11	"Causa Y Efecto"	Paulina Rubio	
July 18	"Causa Y Efecto"	Paulina Rubio	
July 25	"Causa Y Efecto"	Paulina Rubio	
August 1	"Causa Y Efecto"	Paulina Rubio	
August 8	"Causa Y Efecto"	Paulina Rubio	
August 15	"Causa Y Efecto"	Paulina Rubio	
August 22	"Loba"	Shakira	
August 29	"Loba"	Shakira	
September 5	"Loba"	Shakira	
September 12	"Loba"	Shakira	
September 19	"Loba"	Shakira	
September 26	"Loba"	Shakira	
October 3	"Loba"	Shakira	
October 10	"Loba"	Shakira	
October 17	"Loba"	Shakira	
October 24	"Loba"	Shakira	
October 31	"Loba"	Shakira	
November 7	"Esclavo de Sus Besos"	David Bisbal	
November 14	"Looking for Paradise"	Alejandro Sanz featuring Alicia Keys	
November 21	"Looking for Paradise"	Alejandro Sanz featuring Alicia Keys	
November 28	"Looking for Paradise"	Alejandro Sanz featuring Alicia Keys	
December 5	"Looking for Paradise"	Alejandro Sanz featuring Alicia Keys	
December 12	"Looking for Paradise"	Alejandro Sanz featuring Alicia Keys	
December 19	"Looking for Paradise"	Alejandro Sanz featuring Alicia Keys	
December 26	"Looking for Paradise"	Alejandro Sanz featuring Alicia Keys	

== See also ==
- List of number-one Billboard Latin Pop Albums of 2009
- List of number-one Billboard Hot Latin Songs of 2009
