= La Curita =

Song by Aventura

from the album The Last
- Released: June 9, 2009 (album release)
- Recorded: 2009
- Genre: Salsa; Bachata; Tropical
- Length: 4:21
- Label: Premium Latin Music & Sony Music Latin
- Songwriter: Anthony Santos
- Producers: Anthony Santos; Lenny Santos

"La Curita" (English: "The Band-Aid") is a song by the American music group Aventura. It is the fourteenth track from their fifth studio album The Last (2009).

== Chart performance ==
Chart (2011)	Peak position
US Hot Latin Songs (Billboard)	42
US Latin Pop Airplay (Billboard)	32
US Tropical Airplay (Billboard)	6
