= Mi Cama Huele a Ti =

Single by Tito El Bambino

from the album El Patrón
- Released: 2009
- Recorded: 2009
- Genre: Reggaeton
- Length: 4:07
- Label: Siente
- Songwriters: Efraín Fines; Felix Torres; Gabriel Pizarro; Alex Sosa
- Producers: Nérol; Monserrate

Tito El Bambino singles chronology
"El Amor" (2009)	"Mi Cama Huele a Ti" (2009)	"Feliz Navidad" (2009)

Zion & Lennox singles chronology
"Ella Me Motiva" (2009)	"Mi Cama Huele a Ti" (2009)	"Como Curar" (2010)

Charlie Cruz singles chronology
"Como La Primera Vez" (2009)	"Me Cama Huele a Ti (salsa version)" (2009)	"Necesito Mas de Ti" (2010)

"Mi Cama Huele a Ti" ("My Bed Smells Like You") is the second single by reggaeton artist Tito El Bambino from his third studio album El Patrón. The song features reggaeton duo, Zion & Lennox. Two remixes were done for the song: the first one being a ballad version of the song solely by Tito el Bambino, the other being a salsa version of the song replacing Tito el Bambino with Charlie Cruz. "Mi Cama Huele a Ti" received a Latin Billboard Music Award nomination for "Hot Latin Song of the Year, Vocal Event" and also a Lo Nuestro Award nomination for Collaboration of the Year.

== Track listing ==
Official remixes

1. "Mi Cama Huele a Ti" (pop version) – 3:54
2. "Mi Cama Huele a Ti" (salsa version) [Charlie Cruz featuring Zion & Lennox] – 4:35

== Charts ==
=== Weekly charts ===
Chart (2009)	Peak position
Chile (EFE)	1
US Hot Latin Songs (Billboard)	6
US Latin Pop Airplay (Billboard)	13
US Tropical Airplay (Billboard)	1

=== Year-end charts ===
Chart (2009)	Position
US Hot Latin Songs (Billboard)	48

== See also ==
- List of number-one Billboard Hot Tropical Songs of 2009
- List of Billboard Latin Rhythm Airplay number ones of 2009
