= She Wolf (Shakira song) =

2009 single by Shakira

Single by Shakira

from the album She Wolf
- Released: 6 July 2009 (Note: "Loba", the Spanish version of "She Wolf", was released on 6 July 2009, while the English version was released four days later.)
- Recorded: 2008
- Studio: La Marimonda (Nassau, Bahamas); Midnight Blue Studios (Miami, FL); Clinton Recording Studios (New York, NY); Studio Guillaume Tell (Paris, France); Electric Lady Studios (New York, NY); Platinum Sound Recording (New York, NY); The Sample Factory (London, England)
- Genre: Electropop; synth-pop; Italo disco; Hi-NRG
- Length: 3:10
- Label: Epic
- Composers: Shakira; John Hill; Sam Endicott
- Lyricist: Shakira
- Producers: Shakira; John Hill

Shakira singles chronology
"Hay Amores" (2007)	"She Wolf" (2009)	"Did It Again" (2009)

Music videos
- "She Wolf" on YouTube; "Loba" on YouTube

"She Wolf" is a song recorded by Colombian singer-songwriter Shakira for her eighth studio album of the same title (2009). Its lyrics were written by Shakira, whereas its music was composed by Shakira, John Hill, and Sam Endicott. Shakira and Hill also served as the producers of the track. A Spanish version titled "Loba", which features additional lyrical contributions by Jorge Drexler, was also recorded. Musically, "She Wolf" is a hi-NRG, Italo disco, synth-pop and electropop track detailing Shakira's boredom due to her uncaring partner, and how she looks for others to please her. The song was released as the lead single from She Wolf on 6 July 2009, by Epic Records.

Upon release, "She Wolf" was met with favorable reception from music critics, receiving praise for its inventiveness. Commercially, it peaked within the top 10 in 12 countries worldwide, and at number 11 on the US Billboard Hot 100. Meanwhile, "Loba" peaked atop both the Hot Latin Songs and Tropical Songs in the US, as well as the Mexican and Spanish charts. Furthermore, "She Wolf" was certified platinum by the Recording Industry Association of America (RIAA), for digital sales of one million units in the US.

An accompanying music video for "She Wolf" was directed by Jake Nava, and features Shakira dancing in various locations, such as a red cave and a golden cage. Critical reception towards the video was also positive, many of whom praised Shakira's dancing ability. For additional promotion, Shakira performed the song on a number of shows and music festivals. It was also a part of the setlist for The Sun Comes Out World Tour (2010–2011), El Dorado World Tour (2018) and Las Mujeres Ya No Lloran World Tour (2025).

== Background and composition ==
"She Wolf"
An 18 second sample of the chorus of "She Wolf". The song has a seventies-disco vibe to it.

In an interview with Rolling Stone, Shakira said that the idea for "She Wolf" came to her "very mysteriously", revealing "I was in the studio in a bad mood that day, then I got inspired and went to a corner and I wrote the lyrics and the melody in 10 minutes. The image of the she wolf just came to my head, and when I least expected it I was howling and panting". Initially, she felt unsure of being able to write the lyrics in English, reaching out to Sia and Seth MacFarlane for help but nothing came to fruition. Shakira ended up writing the entire lyrics by herself. The music was composed by Shakira with John Hill and Sam Endicott. Shakira and Hill also served as the producers of the song. Endicott, musician and lead singer of American post-punk band The Bravery, explained how he and Hill began working with Shakira, saying she "contacted him (Hill), asking if he had any stuff. We never had her in mind. We just made the thing independently of her, and then she liked it a lot, and she sang over it. She used some of the melodies we put in there and then wrote these crazy lyrics about being a werewolf. And that's how it happened". "She Wolf" contains a sample of the strings breakdown from "Good Times" by Chic. The single was described by Slant Magazine as a "sleek, hi-NRG/Italo throwback that's drenched in disco strings" and "sleek electropop". Mikael Wood from Spin identified the song's genre as synth-pop. Shakira also howls and pants at various times during the song. It is written in B minor key and is a fast dance groove with a tempo of 122 beats per minute. Shakira's vocal range on the song spans from B_{3} to D_{5}. One of the lines of the song, in which Shakira sings "I'm starting to feel just a little abused, like a coffee machine in an office", is often cited as an example of the unusual lyrics present in Shakira's songs.

The song was released by Epic Records as the lead single from the album of the same name. "She Wolf" was made available for digital download on iTunes on 10 July 2009. It was released as a CD single later on 21 September. A Spanish-language translation of the song titled "Loba", which features additional lyrical contributions from Jorge Drexler, was released on 6 July 2009.

== Critical reception ==
The song was well received by most music critics. David Balls from Digital Spy gave the song a positive review and said that the song "manages to be fresh and quirky while still sounding like a smash". Sal Cinquemani from Slant Magazine labelled "She Wolf" as a "sleek, hi-NRG/Italo throwback" and said that its lyrics "walk a fine line between campy and really campy". Michael Cragg from MusicOMH called it "three minutes of delicious pop, as camp as it is clever", and concluded that the song is "the kind of wonderfully bizarre couplet we’ve come to expect from Columbia’s shrinking violet". Jonathan Goss from Sabotage Times praised its lyrics and commended Shakira's use of the word "lycanthropy". He summed up the review by calling "She Wolf" a "modern classic". Spin critic Mikael Wood complemented it as "lovably bonkers." Fraser McAlpine from BBC Chart Blog gave it an overall positive review, but criticized Shakira's howling, calling it "half-hearted". Ben Ratliff from The New York Times, however, gave it a negative review, saying that the song is "undercooked and overwritten" and that it "reaches a special class of fascinating-awful".

At the 2009 International Dance Music Awards ceremony, "She Wolf" was nominated for "Best Latin Track", but lost to Pitbull's song "I Know You Want Me (Calle Ocho)". At the 2009 Los Premios MTV Latinoamérica awards ceremony, the song was nominated in the category "Canción Del Año" ("Song of the Year"). At the 2009 Premios 40 Principales awards ceremony, "Loba" won the award for "Best International Song in Spanish Language". At the 2009 Premios Shock award ceremony, the song was nominated "Best Radio Song". At the 2010 Premios Juventud awards ceremony, the song was nominated for "Mi Ringtone" ("My Ringtone"), but lost to Tito El Bambino's song "El Amor". At the 2010 Latin Billboard Music Awards, the song was nominated for "Latin Pop Airplay Song of the Year" and "Latin Digital Download of the Year", but lost both. At the 2010 ASCAP awards ceremony, Jorge Drexler won an award for his composition of "Loba". It was acknowledged as an award winning song at the 2011 BMI Latin Awards.

=== Lists ===
Critic/Publication	List	Rank	Ref.
SiriusXM	The 31 Best Halloween Songs, Ranked	12	
Cosmopolitan	The 99 Best Halloween Songs Your Party Playlist Needs ASAP	27	
Time Out	The 40 best Halloween songs of all time	9	

== Commercial performance ==
In Austria, the song entered and peaked at number three on the Austrian Singles Chart, spending a total of 19 weeks on the chart. In the Dutch-speaking Flanders region of Belgium, the song entered the Ultratop chart at number 48 and peaked at 16, spending a total of 15 weeks on the chart. It performed much better in the French-speaking Wallonia region of Belgium, where it entered the Ultratop chart at number eight and peaked at number five, spending a total of 21 weeks on the chart. "She Wolf" was Shakira's second consecutive single to peak at number five in the region, after "Beautiful Liar" (2007). In Finland, the song entered the Finnish Singles Chart at number 13 and peaked at number 6, spending a total of 13 weeks on the chart. In Germany, the song peaked at number two on the German Singles Chart. In Ireland, the song peaked at number two on the Irish Singles Chart, spending a total of 12 weeks on the chart. In Italy, "Loba" entered the Italian Singles Chart at number 12 and peaked at number three, spending a total of 22 weeks on the chart. It became Shakira's first single to receive a record certification in the country after the Federazione Industria Musicale Italiana (FIMI) certified the song platinum for selling 30,000 units. In Norway, "She Wolf" narrowly missed charting inside the top ten of the Norwegian Singles Chart by peaking at number 11. In Spain, "Loba" entered the Spanish Singles Chart at number 25 and peaked at number two. In this region, it was certified double-platinum by the Productores de Música de España (PROMUSICAE) for selling 80,000 units. In Switzerland, the song entered and peaked at number three on the Swiss Singles Chart, spending a total of 23 weeks on the chart. In this territory, it was certified gold by the International Federation of the Phonographic Industry (IFPI) for selling 10,000 units. In the United Kingdom, the song peaked at number four on the UK Singles Chart and spent a total of 16 weeks on the chart. The British Phonographic Industry (BPI) certified "She Wolf" platinum for sales and streams of 600,000 units.

In Canada, it peaked at number five on the Canadian Hot 100 chart, spending a total of 20 weeks on the chart. "Loba" became a success in Mexico, peaking at number one on the Monitor Latino airplay chart and receiving a platinum certification from the Asociación Mexicana de Productores de Fonogramas y Videogramas (AMPROFON). In the United States, "She Wolf" debuted at number 34 on the Billboard Hot 100 chart, becoming Shakira's highest debuting song on the chart. It later narrowly missed reaching inside the top 10 of the chart by peaking at number 11. "She Wolf" spent a total of 20 weeks on the chart. On the Hot Dance Club Songs chart, it peaked at number one and spent a total of 15 weeks on the chart. "She Wolf" became Shakira's second solo consecutive single to peak atop the chart after "Illegal" (2006). On the Pop Songs chart, it peaked at number 11 and spent 12 weeks on the chart. "She Wolf" remained as Shakira's highest-debuting single on the Billboard Hot 100 until "Can't Remember to Forget You" broke its record in 2014 by debuting at number 28. The Spanish-language translation "Loba" peaked at number one on Hot Latin Songs chart, spending a total of 22 weeks on the chart. It became Shakira's fourteenth top-ten single on the chart and tied her with American singer-songwriter Selena for having the fifth-most top-ten singles for a female artist. Later in 2010, Shakira became the third-ranking female artist with the highest number of top-ten singles on the chart after the release of "Loca". On the Tropical Songs chart, "Loba" peaked at number one, spending a total of 20 weeks on the chart. "She Wolf" was certified platinum in the United States for digital downloads of 1,000,000 copies by the Recording Industry Association of America (RIAA). As of March 2014, "She Wolf" stands as Shakira's second highest-selling digital song in the United States with sales of 1,812,000 units, behind her 2006 hit "Hips Don't Lie".

== Music video ==
=== Development and synopsis ===
The accompanying music video for the single was directed by Jake Nava who had previously collaborated with Shakira on the video for "Beautiful Liar" (2007). Its cinematography was handled by Pascal Lebègue, who also previously worked as director of photography for the music video of "Whenever, Wherever" (2001). The dance sequences in the video were choreographed by Nadine "Hi-Hat" Ruffin, and are said to incorporate ballet, popping and locking, tribal dance and moves similar to the ones in the 1983 film Flashdance. Talking about her dancing in the video, Shakira said, "I start doing all kinds of outrageous stuff and hanging upside down and doing stuff that wasn't planned. But it was kind of an improvisation. I just got caught in the moment." The music video premiered on 30 July 2009, on MTV and was made available for download on iTunes a day later on 31 July. The video for the Spanish-language translation "Loba" was released on the same day.

The video begins with Shakira getting out of bed in the middle of a full-moon night. Her nails begin to grow and she is shown lacing a pair of boots. Shakira then enters a closet, which leads to the inside of a glittering ruby-red cave, where she begins dancing wearing a black asymmetric bodysuit. The next scene depicts Shakira striking different poses inside a golden cage (with the sign "Do Not Feed the Animal" on top), clad in a skin-toned leotard. Shakira explained the usage of the golden cage in the video, saying that "I just wanted to express what it feels like for a she-wolf to be in captivity. To be in a golden cage. I think I've been in a golden cage most of my life. And now not anymore". The setting changes and Shakira is seen performing a dance routine in a club with many back-up dancers. A wolf is also shown walking in the club and transforming into a woman. Near to the end of the video, Shakira dances on a rooftop with a backdrop resembling San Francisco. As the song ends, she falls backwards from the roof and lands in her closet. The video ends with Shakira lying back in her bed and smiling as thunder cracks while the full moon is still high in the sky.

=== Reception ===
Critical reception towards the video was mostly positive. Adam Fairholm from the Internet Music Video Database praised Shakira's dance moves and flexibility in the video and complimented Nava's direction. James Montgomery from MTV also commended Shakira's dancing, noting that she "even manages to out-Beyoncé". He also complimented Shakira's body, commenting that her posterior is the "breakout star of the video". Anna Pickard from The Guardian appreciated the originality of the video and noted that "the moves contained in this video are not the kind of thing you see every day". Andrew Bast from The Daily Beast, however, gave the video a negative review and criticized it for being overly sexual.

At the 2009 Los Premios MTV Latinoamérica awards ceremony, the video received a nomination in the category "Video del Año" ("Video of the Year"). At the 2010 Premios Juventud awards ceremony, the video won the award for "Mi Video Favorito" ("My Favourite Video"). At the 2010 Premios Lo Nuestro, the video won the award for "Video del Año" ("Video of the Year"). On 28 April 2014, the video reached 100 million views on video-sharing website YouTube and was hence marked "Vevo Certified" by video hosting service Vevo. It is Shakira's tenth "Vevo Certified" video.

== Live performances ==
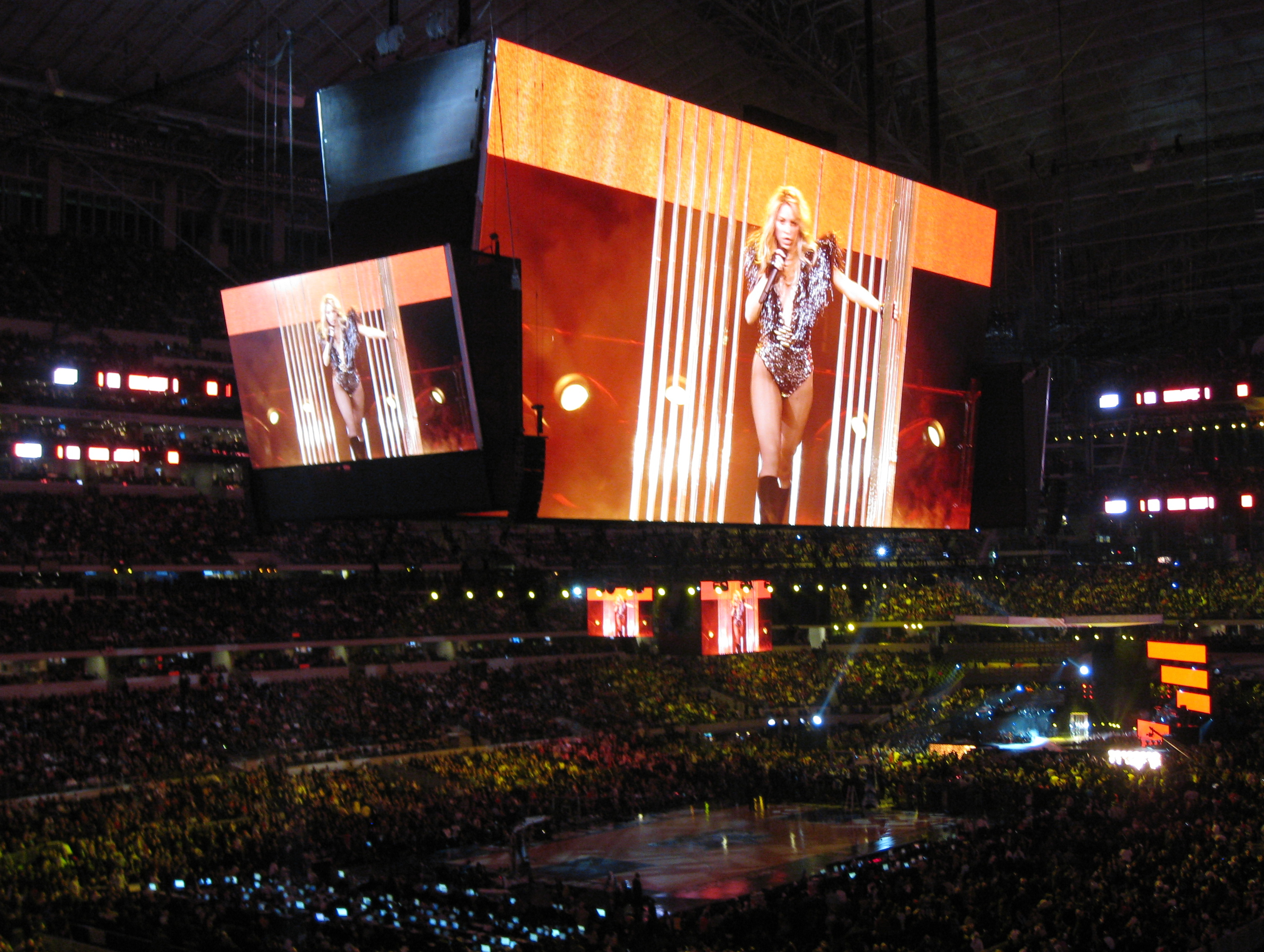
Shakira performing the song at the 2010 NBA All-Star Game

Shakira performed the song live for the first time on the finale of the season four of America's Got Talent, on 16 September 2009. On 17 September, she performed the song at the 2009 ALMA Awards ceremony. She performed "She Wolf" along with "Did It Again", the second single off the album, on the 18 September episode of Jimmy Kimmel Live! and the 17 October episode of Saturday Night Live. On 24 September, Shakira performed "She Wolf" and "Hips Don't Lie" on the BBC Radio 1Xtra Live Lounge. On 28 September, she performed the song on T4, a scheduling slot on Channel 4. On 25 September, she performed the song on Friday Night with Jonathan Ross, along with her hits "Whenever, Wherever" and "Hips Don't Lie".

On 14 February 2010, Shakira performed "She Wolf" and "Give It Up to Me", the third single off the album, during the halftime of the 2010 NBA All-Star Game. At the 2010 Rock in Rio festival held in Madrid, Spain, Shakira performed "Loba", the Spanish-language translation of the song. On 10 June, at the 2010 FIFA World Cup opening ceremony, Shakira performed "She Wolf", "Hips Don't Lie", and the official 2010 FIFA World Cup song, "Waka Waka (This Time For Africa)". On 26 June, Shakira performed the song at the Glastonbury Festival, which took place in Pilton, Somerset. The song was also included on the setlist of The Sun Comes Out World Tour in 2010 and 2011. The tour performance began with Shakira letting out a long howl and proceeding to dance with two female back-up dancers. The performance marked the first time back-up dancers were featured in the show. Dave Simpson from The Guardian commented that Shakira was "howling like a banshee" during the performance.

"She Wolf" was the second song on the setlist of Shakira's 2018 El Dorado World Tour, featured on her live album Shakira in Concert: El Dorado World Tour (2019), and the second to final song in her 2025-2026 Las Mujeres Ya No Lloran World Tour. She performed the song at the 2019 Davis Cup Finals Closing Ceremony alongside the singles "Tutu (Remix)" and "Dare (La La La)".

The song was performed by Shakira during the Super Bowl LIV halftime show.

== Track listings ==
- Digital EP – "She Wolf"
1. "She Wolf" – 3:07
2. "She Wolf" (Moto Blanco Club Mix) – 7:07
3. "She Wolf" (Moto Blanco Radio Mix) – 3:39
4. "She Wolf" (Calvin Harris Remix) – 4:46
5. "She Wolf" (Deeplick Club Remix) – 7:05
6. "She Wolf" (Deeplick Club Remix Radio Edit) – 3:25
7. "She Wolf" (Remix featuring T-Pain) – 3:18
- Digital EP – "She Wolf / Loba" (2023 re-release)
1. "She Wolf" – 3:07
2. "She Wolf" (sped-up) – 2:46
3. "Loba" – 3:07
4. "Loba" (sped-up) – 2:46
5. "She Wolf" (instrumental) – 3:07
- Digital EP/Mexican CD Maxi – ("Loba")
1. "Loba" – 3:07
2. "Loba" (Poncho Club Mix) – 3:50
3. "Loba" (Poncho Radio Mix) – 3:42
4. "Loba" (Deep Mariano Club Mix) – 5:05
5. "Loba" (Deep Mariano Radio Mix) – 4:34
- CD single
1. "She Wolf" – 3:07
2. "Loba" – 3:07
- Digital download ("She Wolf")
1. "She Wolf" – 3:07
- Digital download ("Loba")
1. "Loba" – 3:07
- Promo single ("Loba")
1. "Loba" (Salsa version) – 3:56

== Charts ==
=== Weekly charts ===
2009–2010 weekly chart performance for "She Wolf"
Charts (2009–2010)	Peak position
Australia (ARIA)	18
Austria (Ö3 Austria Top 40)	3
Belgium (Ultratop 50 Flanders)	16
Belgium (Ultratop 50 Wallonia)	5
Canada Hot 100 (Billboard)	5
Canada CHR/Top 40 (Billboard)	13
CIS Airplay (TopHit)	77
Croatia International Airplay (HRT)	2
Czech Republic Airplay (ČNS IFPI)	12
Denmark (Tracklisten)	16
European Hot 100 Singles (Billboard)	4
Finland (Suomen virallinen lista)	6
France Download (SNEP)	4
Germany (GfK)	2
Global Dance Songs (Billboard)	8
Hungary (Rádiós Top 40)	5
Ireland (IRMA)	2
Italy (FIMI)	11
Japan (Japan Hot 100)	9
Japanese Albums (Oricon) (Note: In Japan, "She Wolf" was released as an 8-track extended play (EP). Thus, it was eligible to enter solely the Oricon Albums Chart.)	174
Netherlands (Dutch Top 40)	22
Netherlands (Single Top 100)	13
New Zealand (Recorded Music NZ)	36
Norway (VG-lista)	11
Romania TV Airplay (Media Forest)	18
Russia Airplay (TopHit)	95
Scottish Singles Sales (Official Charts)	4
Slovakia Airplay (ČNS IFPI)	13
Spain (Promusicae)	2
Sweden (Sverigetopplistan)	17
Switzerland (Schweizer Hitparade)	3
UK Singles (Official Charts)	4
Ukraine Airplay (TopHit)	39
US Billboard Hot 100	11
US Digital Song Sales (Billboard)	7
US Dance Club Songs (Billboard)	1
US Pop Airplay (Billboard)	11
US Rhythmic Airplay (Billboard)	23

2009 weekly chart performance for "Loba"
Chart	Peak position
Chile (EFE)	8
CIS Airplay (TopHit)	16
Italy (FIMI)	3
Italy (Musica e dischi)	29
Mexico (Mexico Airplay)	1
Nicaragua (EFE)	5
Russia Airplay (TopHit)	64
Spain (Promusicae)	1
US Hot Latin Songs (Billboard)	1
US Latin Pop Airplay (Billboard)	1
US Tropical Airplay (Billboard)	1

2020 weekly chart performance for "She Wolf" / "Loba"
Chart	Peak position
Scotland (OCC)	96
US Digital Song Sales (Billboard)	30
US Latin Digital Songs (Billboard) "Loba"	3

=== Monthly charts ===
2009 monthly chart performance for "She Wolf"
Chart	Peak Position
Brazil (Brasil Hot 100 Airplay)	29
Brazil (Brasil Hot Pop Songs)	20

=== Year-end charts ===
2009 year-end chart performance for "She Wolf"
Chart	Peak Position
Austria (Ö3 Austria Top 40)	41
Belgium (Ultratop 50 Flanders)	88
Belgium (Ultratop 50 Wallonia)	51
Brazil (Crowley Broadcast Analysis)	33
Canada (Canadian Hot 100)	57
Croatia International Airplay (HRT)	26
European Hot 100 Singles (Billboard)	55
Germany (GfK)	39
Hungary (Rádiós Top 40)	67
Italy (FIMI)	7
Japan (Japan Hot 100)	58
Japan Adult Contemporary (Billboard)	50
Lebanon (Airplay Top 100)	15
Russia Airplay (TopHit)	98
Spain (PROMUSICAE)	7
Sweden (Sverigetopplistan)	81
Switzerland (Schweizer Hitparade)	39
UK Singles (OCC)	67
US Billboard Hot 100	64
US Dance Club Songs (Billboard)	13
US Hot Latin Songs (Billboard)	9
US Tropical Airplay (Billboard)	13

2009 year-end chart performance for "Loba"
Chart	Peak Position
Russia Airplay (TopHit)	191

2010 year-end chart performance for "She Wolf"
Chart (2010)	Peak position
Hungary (Rádiós Top 40)	48
Spain (PROMUSICAE)	45

2020 year-end chart performance for "She Wolf"
Chart	Position
US Latin Digital Songs (Billboard)	36

== Certifications ==
Certifications and sales for "She Wolf"
Region	Certification	Certified units/sales
Australia (ARIA)	Gold	35,000^{‡}
Brazil (Pro-Música Brasil)	Platinum	60,000^{‡}
Canada (Music Canada)	2× Platinum	160,000^{‡}
Denmark (IFPI Danmark)	Gold	45,000^{‡}
Germany (BVMI)	Gold	150,000^{‡}
Italy (FIMI)	Platinum	20,000^{*}
Mexico (AMPROFON)	Platinum	60,000^{*}
Mexico (AMPROFON) "Loba"	2× Diamond+Gold	630,000^{‡}
New Zealand (RMNZ)	Gold	15,000^{‡}
Spain (Promusicae)	2× Platinum	80,000^{*}
Spain (Promusicae) "Loba"	Gold	30,000^{‡}
Switzerland (IFPI Switzerland)	Gold	15,000^{^}
United Kingdom (BPI)	Platinum	600,000^{‡}
United States (RIAA)	Platinum	1,812,000
^{*} Sales figures based on certification alone.^{^} Shipments figures based on certification alone.^{‡} Sales+streaming figures based on certification alone.

== Release history ==
Release dates and formats for "She Wolf"
Region	Date	Format(s)	Version(s)	Label(s)	Ref.
Various	6 July 2009	Digital download	"Loba"	Epic	
Various	10 July 2009	Digital download	"She Wolf"	Epic	
United States	20 July 2009	Contemporary hit radio	"She Wolf"	Epic	
Australia	24 August 2009	CD; maxi CD	"She Wolf"	Sony Music Australia	
Japan	2 September 2009	Maxi CD	"She Wolf"	Sony Music Japan	
Germany	4 September 2009	CD	"She Wolf"; "Loba"	Sony Music Germany	
United Kingdom	21 September 2009	CD	"She Wolf"; "Loba"	RCA UK	

== See also ==
- Billboard Top Latin Songs Year-End Chart
- List of best-selling Latin singles
- List of number-one songs of 2009 (Mexico)
- List of number-one dance singles of 2009 (U.S.)
- List of number-one Billboard Hot Latin Songs of 2009
- List of number-one Billboard Hot Latin Pop Airplay of 2009
- List of number-one Billboard Hot Tropical Songs of 2009
