= El Desprecio (song) =

Promotional single by Aventura

from the album The Last
- Released: June 9, 2009 (album release)
- Recorded: 2008
- Genre: Bachata
- Length: 4:35
- Label: Premium Latin Music & Sony Music Latin
- Songwriters: Anthony Santos; Eric Rivera
- Producers: Anthony Santos; Lenny Santos

"El Desprecio" (English: "The Contempt") is a song by American music group Aventura. It is the eleventh track from their fifth studio album The Last (2009). The song was featured as a soundtrack for Grand Theft Auto IV's second expansion episode pack, The Ballad of Gay Tony.

== Chart performance ==
Chart (2010)	Peak position
US Tropical Airplay (Billboard)	40
