= The Last (album) =

Studio album by Aventura
- Released: June 9, 2009
- Recorded: 2008–2009
- Studios: Platinum Sound Recording, Legacy Recording Studios (New York City, New York); Skylight Recording, Kick Back Productions & Recording Studio, (New Jersey); The Hit Factory (Miami, Florida)
- Genres: Latin pop; bachata; tropical
- Length: 75:26
- Labels: Premium Latin; Sony Latin
- Producers: Anthony "Romeo" Santos; Gerry Grimaud Jr.; Henry Santos Jeter; Wyclef Jean; Jerry Duplessis; Logic; Tainy; Victor "El Nasi"; Marioso; Angel Fernandez

Aventura chronology
Kings of Bachata: Sold Out at Madison Square Garden (2007)	The Last (2009)	14 + 14 (2011)

Singles from The Last
- 1. "Por Un Segundo" Released: November 10, 2008; 2. "All Up 2 You" Released: April 27, 2009; 3. "Su Veneno" Released: June 30, 2009; 4. "Dile Al Amor" Released: October 13, 2009; 5. "El Malo" Released: March 11, 2010

The Last is the fifth and final studio album by the bachata group Aventura, released on June 9, 2009. In the "Intro" of this album, Anthony "Romeo" Santos states that this could possibly be their last album; his prediction came true in July 2011 when the group publicly confirmed it was breaking up for good.

The Last became the top selling Latin album of 2009 and 2010. The Last spent 23 weeks at number one in the Latin Billboard chart. The Last debuted at number 5 in the Billboard chart and number 1 in the Latin Billboard chart.

== Album information ==
One of the members of the group, the guitarist Lenny told MTV that the album was recorded in Wyclef's studio, and stated that Wyclef wanted to record a song with them. The song was "Spanish Fly", which features Wyclef Jean and Ludacris.

Rumors were circulating that this album would be the last of the group. In the "Intro" of this album, Anthony Santos states that this could possibly be their last album. However, the group said that this is their last album with their label Premium Latin Music. So there will still be Aventura albums to come in the near future, but however in 2011, that was rebuked after Santos announced that the group is breaking up for good.

Aside from their original Bachata sound, the album also explores new genres for the group. In the song "All Up 2 You", has a Europop dance sound with auto-tune effects. Also the songs "Spanish Fly" has a dance-pop sound. The New York Times called "The Last", Aventura's surest, catchiest record. The group collaborated with reggaeton duo Wisin & Yandel, Akon, Wyclef Jean, and Ludacris.

The album has become thus far the group's best album. The album spawned four hit singles, two which topped the Latin charts, and has been the #1 album for 23 weeks on Billboard Top Latin Albums. At the Premio Lo Nuestro 2010 awards, the album was awarded "Tropical Album of the Year". At the Billboard Latin Music Awards of 2010 in held in San Juan, Puerto Rico Aventura won nine awards including one for Album of the Year for "The Last"

== Singles ==
=== Main singles ===
"Por Un Segundo" is the first single release from the album, released November 10, 2008. It became the group's first number 1 on the Billboard Hot Latin Tracks chart. It also peaked at number 1 on both the Latin Rhythm and Tropical Songs Billboard charts.The music video was released in 2009 and features the winner of Cycle 8 of America's Next Top Model, Jaslene Gonzalez.

"All Up 2 You" was released as the second single. The song features R&B artist Akon, and reggaeton duo Wisin & Yandel and a remix with dancehall artist Adrian Banton. It peaked at number 4 on the Billboard Hot Latin Tracks chart, at number 2 on the Billboard Tropical Songs chart at number 1 on both the Latin Rhythm Songs charts. The music video was released on June 5, 2009.

"Su Veneno" was released as the third single on June 30, 2009. The song was released as a bolero version and a bachata version the following day. It peaked at number 4 on the Billboard Hot Latin Tracks chart, and at number 1 on the Billboard Tropical Songs chart, lasting 5 weeks on that spot. The music video for the Bachata version was released on July 20, 2009. The music video for the Bolero version was released the next day.

"Dile al Amor" was released as the fourth single on October 13, 2009. It peaked at number at number 2 on the Billboard Bubbling Under Hot 100 chart. It also peaked at number 1 on the Billboard Hot Latin Tracks chart, became the group's second number one on that chart. It also peaked at number 1 on the Billboard Tropical Songs chart, lasting 15 weeks on that spot. The music video was released on November 4, 2009.

"El Malo" was released as the fifth single on March 11, 2010. Initially, the song did not reach same success as the previous singles on the Hot Latin Tracks until it was re-released. It peaked at number 5 on the Billboard Hot Latin Tracks chart and at number 1 on the Billboard Tropical Songs charts. The music video was released on June 29, 2010.

=== Promotional single and other charted songs ===
"El Desprecio" was released as the promo single and only peaked number 40 on the Billboard Tropical Songs charts. It was featured on the soundtrack for Grand Theft Auto: The Ballad of Gay Tony, which is an expansion pack from Grand Theft Auto IV's Episodes from Liberty City.

"La Curita" is a Salsa song. It peaked at number 42 on the Billboard Hot Latin Tracks chart, at number 32 on the Billboard Latin Pop Songs chart, and at number 6 on the Billboard Tropical Songs chart.

Other songs that hit the charts was the song "Tu Jueguito", which peaked at number 27 on the Billboard Latin Pop Songs chart. On the Billboard Tropical Songs charts, the song "Peligro" peaked at number 40, and the song "La Tormenta" peaked at number 32.

== Chart performance ==
The Last debuted at number five in the U.S. Billboard 200 with sales of 47,000 units in its first week. The album also arrived at number-one on the Top Latin Albums chart, where it became their first chart-topper and holding the number one position for 16 non-consecutive weeks on the top Latin charts and becoming the best selling Latin album of 2009 with 246,000 copies sold. It sold over 500,000 copies worldwide.

== Critical reception ==
Professional ratings
Review scores
Source	Rating
Allmusic	3.5/5 stars
About.com	4.5/5 stars

John Bush of Allmusic gave the album a somewhat positive review. He called the lead single "Por un Segundo" a "straight bachata, rhythmic and sweet" and noted that the crossovers are put on the latter half of the album. Tijana Ilich of About.com praised the vocals of Anthony "Romeo" Santos and the called song "Soy Hombre" the best on the album. On the other hand, she criticized the lack of diversity on the album as "Basically all-bachata album".

== Track listing ==
All tracks are written by Anthony "Romeo" Santos, including where noted.

No.	Title	Writer(s)	Translation	Length
1.	"Intro" (The Last)			1:24
2.	"Por Un Segundo"		"For One Second"	4:15
3.	"Yo Quisiera Amarla"		"I Would Like To Love Her"	5:06
4.	"El Malo"		"The Bad Guy"	3:58
5.	"Dile Al Amor"		"Tell Love"	3:49
6.	"Su Veneno"		"Her Poison"	4:18
7.	"Tu Jueguito"		"Your Little Game"	3:42
8.	"Spanish Fly" (featuring Ludacris and Wyclef Jean)	Christopher Bridges, Wyclef Jean, Jerry Duplessis		3:57
9.	"Peligro"		"Danger"	4:38
10.	"La Tormenta"		"The Storm"	4:35
11.	"El Desprecio"		"The Contempt"	4:35
12.	"All Up 2 You" (featuring Akon and Wisin & Yandel)	Llandel Veguilla, Juan Luis Morera Luna, Aliaune Thiam, Marcos Masís		3:38
13.	"Skit"			4:05
14.	"La Curita"		"The Band-Aid"	4:21
15.	"Princesita"	Henry Santos Jeter	"Little Princess"	4:17
16.	"Su Vida"		"Her Life"	4:34
17.	"Soy Hombre" (featuring Arturo Sandoval)		"I'm A Man"	4:33
18.	"Gracias"		"Thank You"	7:33
Total length:				1:15:26

== Personnel ==
- Featured Artist – Akon
- Guiro – Albert Batista
- Guira – Alberto Batista
- Guest Artist, Viola, Violin – Ali Bello
- Composer – Aliaume Thiam
- Arranger, Audio Production, Horn Arrangements, Producer – Angel Fernandez
- Arranger, Composer, Producer – Anthony "Romeo" Santos
- Keyboards – Arden "Keyz" Altino
- Keyboards – Arden Altino
- Guest Artist, Trumpet – Arturo Sandoval
- Primary Artist – Aventura
- Bass, Bass Instrument – Carlos Henríquez
- Composer – Christopher Bridges
- Photography – Dale May
- Audio Engineer, Engineer – Dave Clauss
- Cello, Guest Artist – David Gotay
- Piano – Efrain "Junito" Davila
- Guest Artist, Guira, Guiro – Enrique Guira
- Arranger, Guitar, Acoustic Guitar, Electric Guitar, Background Vocals – Eric "Bori" Rivera
- Arranger, Guitar, Acoustic Guitar, Electric Guitar, Background Vocals – Eric 'Bori' Rivera
- Guest Artist, Tambors – Frank Junior Inoa
- Guest Artist, Guitar – Frank Mendez
- Guest Artist, Guitar – Frank Mendez
- Engineer – Franklin Romero
- Accordion, Guest Artist – Geovanny Polanco
- Audio Engineer, Audio Production, Acoustic Guitar, Mixing, Mixing Engineer, Producer, Vocals, Background Vocals – Gerry Grimaud Jr.
- Mixing, Mixing Engineer – Gerson Corniel
- Guest Artist, Vocals – Giselle Moya
- Congas, Guest Artist – Guillermo Frias
- Background Vocals – Henry Jeter
- Producer, Background Vocals – Henry Santos
- Composer, Producer – Henry Santos Jeter
- Bass, Bass Instrument, Composer, Producer – Jerry "Wonda" Duplessis
- Piano, Synthesizer – Joaquin Diaz
- Keyboards, Sound Effects – Joshua Mateo
- Composer – Juan Luis Morera
- Guest Artist, Vocals – Judy Marte
- Producer – Lamont "Logic" Coleman
- Guest Artist, Vocals – Lawreida Cartwright
- Arranger, Audio Production, Guitar, Producer – Lenny Santos
- Bongos, Guest Artist – Leonardo Reyes
- Bongos, Guest Artist – Leonardo Reyes
- Composer – Llandel Veguilla
- Featured Artist, Producer – Ludacris
- Bongos, Congas, Percussion, Timbales – Luisito Quintero
- Audio Production, Composer, Producer – Marcos Masis
- Engineer – Mark "Exit" Goodchild
- Audio Production, Arranger, Producer – Max Borghetti
- Bass, Bass Instrument – Max Santos
- Art Direction, Design, Photography – Michael Robinson
- Flute – Mitch Frohman
- Guest Artist, Vocals – Noa Neve
- Guest Artist – Noah Nevé
- Trombone – Ozzie Melendez
- Guest Artist, Guiro – Radhames Rey
- Flugelhorn, Guest Artist, Trumpet – Raul Agraz
- Bongos – Raul Biel
- Synthesizer – Ricky Gonzalez
- Arranger, Audio Production, Keyboards, Sound Effects, Background Vocals – Romeo
- Mastering, Mastering Engineer – Tom Brick
- Mastering, Mastering Engineer – Tom Coyne
- Guest Artist, Saxophone – William Jose Brito
- Guest Artist, Guitar – Wilmore "Bimbo" Franco
- Composer, Featured Artist – Wisin & Yandel
- Composer, Featured Artist, Guest Artist, Producer – Wyclef Jean
- Primary Artist – Yandel

== Producers ==
The album was produced mostly by Anthony "Romeo" Santos, Lenny Santos, and Gerry Grimaud, Jr. Other artist and producers were involve in producing the following tracks:

- Jerry Duplessis, Wyclef Jean, and Logic – Spanish Fly
- Tainy, Victor "El Nasi", Max Borghetti and Marioso – All Up 2 You
- Angel Fernandez – La Curita
- Henry Santos Jeter – Princesita

== Charts ==
=== Weekly charts ===
Chart (2009–11)	Peak position
Chilean Albums (FeriaDelDisco)	4
Ecuadorian Albums (Musicalisimo)	19
Mexican Albums (AMPROFON)	16
Swiss Albums (Schweizer Hitparade)	10
US Billboard 200	5
US Top Current Album Sales (Billboard)	5
US Top Latin Albums (Billboard)	1
US Tropical Albums (Billboard)	1
Venezuelan Albums (Recordland)	2

=== Year-end charts ===
Chart (2009)	Position
US Billboard 200	160
US Top Latin Albums (Billboard)	1
US Tropical Albums (Billboard)	1
Chart (2010)	Position
US Top Latin Albums (Billboard)	1
US Tropical Albums (Billboard)	1
Chart (2011)	Position
US Top Latin Albums (Billboard)	51
US Tropical Albums (Billboard)	7
Chart (2020)	Position
US Top Latin Albums (Billboard)	96
US Tropical Albums (Billboard)	18
Chart (2021)	Position
US Top Latin Albums (Billboard)	56
US Tropical Albums (Billboard)	9
Chart (2022)	Position
US Top Latin Albums (Billboard)	52
US Tropical Albums (Billboard)	7

== Sales and certifications ==
Region	Certification	Certified units/sales
Mexico (AMPROFON)	Platinum	80,000^{^}
United States (RIAA)	4× Platinum (Latin)	400,000^{^}
^{^} Shipments figures based on certification alone.

== Release history ==
Region	Date	Label
United States	June 9, 2009	Sony International
Canada	June 9, 2009	Strichcode
Germany	June 12, 2009	Strichcode
France	June 12, 2009	Strichcode
United Kingdom	September 9, 2009	Sony International

== See also ==
- List of number-one Billboard Top Latin Albums of 2009
- List of number-one Billboard Latin Albums from the 2010s
- List of number-one Billboard Tropical Albums from the 2000s
- List of number-one Billboard Tropical Albums from the 2010s
