= All Up 2 You =

Single by Aventura featuring Akon and Wisin & Yandel

from the album The Last
- Released: April 27, 2009 (Digital) June 5, 2009 (music video)
- Recorded: 2009
- Genre: R&B
- Length: 3:38
- Label: Premium Latin Music
- Songwriters: Anthony Santos, Llandel Veguilla, Luis Morera Luna, Marcos Masís, Aliaune Thiam
- Producers: Tainy, Victor "El Nasi", Max Borghetti, Marioso

Aventura singles chronology
| "Por Un Segundo" (2009) | "All Up 2 You" (2009) | "Su Veneno" (2009) |

Akon singles chronology
| "Overtime" (2009) | "All Up 2 You" (2009) | "We Don't Care" (2009) |

Wisin & Yandel singles chronology
| "Abusadora" (2009) | "All Up 2 You" (2009) | "Gracias a Ti" (2009) |

Music video
- "All Up 2 You" on YouTube

All Up 2 You is a promotional single by Aventura from their album The Last. The song features Akon and Wisin & Yandel. On April 23, the group performed the song at the 2009 Latin Billboard Music Awards. Aventura member Romeo uses the auto-tune effect in his vocals. A merengue remix was made for the song. The song was also included on Wisin & Yandel's re-release album La Revolución: Evolution, and for the Mexican and Brazilian edition there is a remix featuring dancehall artist Adrian Banton. In Premios Lo Nuestro 2010, the song was nominated for Urban Song of the Year, losing to Tito el Bambino's "El Amor" and Collaboration of the Year losing to Luis Fonsi's "Aquí Estoy Yo". In 2011, Aventura released a greatest hits album exclusively for Spain in which included a remix version of the song in the same genre as a bonus track. This version did not include Akon and it was renamed "Vete".

== Music video ==
Romeo, Akon and Wisin & Yandel in the music video for "All Up 2 You".

=== Development ===
The music video was filmed in May 2009 in Mondrian Hotel in Miami Beach, Florida and was directed by Jessy Terrero. It was premiered on June 5, 2009.

The music video it starts when Romeo calls Lenny, Henry, Max by Aventura along with Wisin & Yandel to talk about a mysterious package, later it shows the artists singing on a white room and in other shots outside in a garden. Different areas of the hotel are shown throughout the video while the artists sing along.

== Chart performance ==
| Chart (2009) | Peak position |
|---|---|
| Dominican Republic Airplay (Top Latino) | 2 |
| U.S. Billboard Hot Latin Tracks | 4 |
| U.S. Billboard Latin Rhythm Songs | 1 |
| U.S. Billboard Latin Tropical Songs | 2 |
| U.S. Billboard Latin Pop Songs | 14 |
| U.S. Bubbling Under Hot 100 Singles | 8 |
| U.S Heatseekers Songs | 41 |

== See also ==
- List of Billboard Latin Rhythm Airplay number ones of 2009
