= Quiéreme Más =

Studio album by Patrulla 81
- Released: February 17, 2009
- Genre: Duranguense
- Label: Disa
- Producer: Martín Velásquez

Patrulla 81 chronology
La Historia (2008)	Quiéreme Más (2009)

Quiéreme Más ("Love Me More") is the title of a studio album released by duranguense band Patrulla 81. This album became their first number-one set on the Billboard Top Latin Albums.

== Track listing ==
The track listing from Allmusic.

No.	Title	Writer(s)	Length
1.	"Quiéreme Más"	Héctor Fregoso	3:36
2.	"Por Amor"	J. Ángel Medina Soto	2:27
3.	"No Puedo Olvidarte"	Medina	3:15
4.	"Así Te Quería"	Medina	2:46
5.	"Reina de Mi Alma"	Medina	2:27
6.	"Que Poca Suerte"	Adolfo Ángel Alba	3:21
7.	"Cómo Pude Equivocarme"	Medina	3:12
8.	"Se Fué"	Medina	3:17
9.	"Si No Te Veo [Cumbia]"	Medina	2:19
10.	"Se Me Está Escapando"	Reyes Lugo	3:16
11.	"Serenata"	Medina	2:33
12.	"Tres Días"	Medina	2:39

== Charts ==
=== Weekly charts ===
Chart (2009)	Peak position
US Billboard 200	66
US Top Latin Albums (Billboard)	1
US Regional Mexican Albums (Billboard)	1

=== Year-end charts ===
Chart (2009)	Position
US Top Latin Albums (Billboard)	20

== Sales and certifications ==
Region	Certification	Certified units/sales
United States (RIAA)	Platinum (Latin)	100,000^{^}
^{^} Shipments figures based on certification alone.
