= Charlie Cruz =

- Born: 3 April 1975 (age 49)
- Origin: Puerto Rico
- Genres: Salsa
- Years active: 1997–present
- Labels: Ariola, Sir George, WEA Latina, Univision
- Website: MySpace Profile

Charlie Cruz (born 3 April 1975 in Río Piedras, Puerto Rico) has been in the Salsa scene for over 20 years. His start was well received by fans of Salsa music.

== Career ==
Born in 1975 in Puerto Rico Cruz was the oldest of seven siblings. He lived his adolescent years in Paterson, New Jersey, in the United States, where he grew to love salsa music. His models were exponents of the Afro-Caribbean genre such as Héctor Lavoe and Frankie Ruiz. His musical career started by singing chorus for his father, Fonzy Cruz, who recorded three records. In 1996, the younger Cruz decided to move to Puerto Rico to be closer to his family and musical roots. By so doing, he entered the salsa scene, working for two years as a vocalist in Domingo Quiñones' orchestra. At that time he took singing classes and studied piano as well.

In his 2nd CD as a soloist, Cruz hit the international scene with his album Imaginate. With the WEA Latina label, the production was helped by Sergio George who directed and arranged. In that album, Cruz was co- songwriter of "Y gritaré", together with Guadalupe García and Sergio George.

Few people know that before becoming a singer he worked for five years as a boxer and became a professional in the 132 pound weight class. But the pull of music was stronger still, impelling him into a career as professional music artist. His latest release: Asi Soy featured the song Hoy es el Dia.

Charlie Cruz, who today divides his time between Puerto Rico and Tampa, grew up in the small town of Naguabo. His love of salsa began as a 10-year-old, when he became a backup singer in the orchestra of his father, Fonzy Cruz. The more he was exposed to music, the more he loved it. As he gained stage experience and worked with established salsa hit makers, Cruz realized how much he truly loved the genre. His life changed drastically when he was invited to perform at a concert and share the stage with top acts like Gilberto Santa Rosa, Victor Manuelle and Tito Nieves. As a result of this performance, he was signed by Sir George Records. Under this label, he produced such hits as "Bombon de Azucar" and "Amarte es un problema." "Dejala que Baile," the first single off Mas de mi, features an upbeat, catchy flavor that will have every salsa fan swinging their hips on the dance floor.

== Discography ==
=== Albums ===
- La Magia De Amor (1997)
- Imagínate (album) (1999)
- Así Soy (2000)
- Un Chico Malo (2001)
- Juntos (2002)
- Ven a Mí (2003)
- Como Nunca (2004)
- Mala Remix Featuring Tonny Tun Tun produced by G1E Productionz (2005)
- Más De Mí (2006)
- Dinámico (2008)
- Sigo Aqui (2010)
- Huellas (2013)
- Tu Con El (2018)
