= Ciclos (Luis Enrique album) =

Studio album by Luis Enrique
- Released: 19 May 2009
- Recorded: 2008–2009
- Studio: Alliance Recording Studios (Hollywood, Florida, USA); The Hit Factory Critiera; Picks And Hammers; Sonic Projects Studios; The Tiki Room (Miami, Florida, USA)
- Genre: Salsa; latin pop; tropical
- Length: 47:37
- Label: Top Stop Music
- Producer: Bob Benozzo; Sergio George

Luis Enrique chronology
Dentro Y Fuera (2007)	Ciclos (2009)	Soy y Sere (2011)

Singles from Ciclos
- 1. "Yo No Sé Mañana" Released: 23 March 2009; 2. "Como Volver a Ser Feliz" Released: 14 September 2009; 3. "Sonríe" Released: 1 February 2010

Professional ratings
Review scores
Source	Rating
Allmusic	3.5/5 stars

Ciclos (English: Cycles) is the 17th studio album recorded by American salsa singer-songwriter Luis Enrique, The album was released by Top Stop Music on 19 May 2009 (see 2009 in music). The album became his first number-one set on the Billboard Tropical Albums chart since Una Historia Diferente in 1991.

== Track listing ==
1. "Yo No Sé Mañana" (Jorge Luís Piloto, Jorge Villamizar) – 4:19
2. "Cómo Volver a Ser Feliz" (Amaury Gutiérrez, Luis Enrique Mejia) – 4:11
3. "Sonríe" (Sergio George, Mejia, Fernando Osorio) – 4:14
4. "Sombras Nada Más" (Jose Maria Contursi, Francisco Lomuso) – 4:27
5. "Parte de Este Juego" (Gianmarco Zignago) – 4:02
6. "No Me Des la Espalda" (Gutierrez) – 4:46
7. "Autobiografía" (Mejia, Piloto) – 4:34
8. "Cambia" (Carlos Varela) – 4:59
9. "Inocencia" (Mejia, Osorio) – 4:19
10. "Abre Tus Ojos" (Mejia, Osorio ) – 3:47
11. "Yo No Sé Mañana" (Piloto, Villamizar) (Pop Version) – 3:51

== Credits and personnel ==
- Jose Aguirre – trumpet, horn arrangements
- Carlos Álvarez – mixing
- Juan Mario Aracil "Mayito" – engineer
- Alberto Barros – trombone
- Ahmed Barroso – guitar
- Bob Benozzo – arranger, keyboards, programming, producer, engineer
- LaTisha Cotto – director
- Tom Coyne – mastering
- Leonardo Di Angilla – percussion
- Luis Enrique – guitar, percussion, Chorus
- Sergio George – arranger, producer
- Guianko Gómez – chorus
- Andrés Hernández – Photographer
- Raúl Hernández – concept, cover design
- Lee Levin – drums
- Luis Márquez – horn arrangements
- Elio Rivagli – drums
- Héctor Rubén Rivera – production coordination
- Reuben Rodríguez – bass
- Yorgis Goiricelaya – bass
- Milton Salcedo – keyboards
- José Sibaja – trumpet
- Manolito – arranger
- Rafael Solano – conga, shekere
- Andrea Valfré – engineer
- Ismael Vergara – sax
- Robert Vilera – bongos, timbals, bell
- Sidney Swift – engineer

== Charts ==
=== Weekly charts ===
Chart (2009)	Peak position
US Billboard 200	126
US Independent Albums (Billboard)	18
US Top Latin Albums (Billboard)	2
US Tropical Albums (Billboard)	1

=== Year-end charts ===
Chart (2009)	Position
US Top Latin Albums (Billboard)	35
Chart (2010)	Position
US Top Latin Albums (Billboard)	59

=== Singles ===
Year	Chart	Single	Peak
2009	Billboard Hot Latin Songs	Como Volver a Ser Feliz	24
2009	Billboard Latin Pop Airplay	Como Volver a Ser Feliz	16
2009	Billboard Tropical/Salsa	Como Volver a Ser Feliz	6
2009	Billboard Hot Latin Tracks	Yo No Sé Mañana	6
2009	Billboard Latin Pop Airplay	Yo No Sé Mañana	28
2009	Billboard Latin Tropical Airplay	Yo No Sé Mañana	1
2009	Billboard Hot Latin Tracks	Yo No Sé Mañana	12
2009	Billboard Latin Pop Airplay	Yo No Sé Mañana	12
2009	Billboard Tropical Airplay	Yo No Sé Mañana	1
2010	Dutch Single Top 100	Yo No Sé Mañana	13
2010	Billboard Latin Pop Airplay	Sonrie	30
2010	Billboard Tropical/Salsa	Sonrie	17

== Sales and certifications ==
Region	Certification	Certified units/sales
United States (RIAA)	Gold (Latin)	50,000^{^}
United States (RIAA) DVD	Gold	50,000^{^}
^{^} Shipments figures based on certification alone.

== Awards ==
=== Latin Grammy Awards ===
The Album received five nominations for the Latin Grammy Awards of 2009. The album won the following awards:

- Best Salsa Album: Ciclos
- Best Tropical Song: "Yo No Sé Mañana" (Jorge Luis Piloto and Jorge Villamizar, songwriters)

The Album was also nominated for the following awards:

- Album of the Year: Ciclos
- Song of the Year: "Yo No Sé Mañana" (Jorge Luis Piloto and Jorge Villamizar, songwriters)
- Producer of the Year: Sergio George

=== Grammy Awards ===
The Album won the following at the 2010 Grammy Awards:

- Best Tropical Latin Album

== See also ==
- List of number-one Billboard Tropical Albums from the 2000s
