= El Patrón =

Studio album by Tito El Bambino
- Released: March 24, 2009
- Recorded: 2008
- Genre: Reggaeton; merengue; bachata
- Label: Universal Latino; Siente
- Producer: Nérol; Monserrate; Mambo Kingz; Robert Cora; Luis O'Neill; Haze; Ronnie Torres; Marioso

Tito El Bambino chronology
It's My Time (2007)	El Patrón (2009)	El Patrón: Invencible (2011)

Singles from El Patrón
- 1. "Vamos Pal Agua" Released: 2008; 2. "Under" Released: 2009; 3. "El Amor" Released: 2009; 4. "Mi Cama Huele A Ti" Released: 2009; 5. "Te Comencé A Querer" Released: 2010

Singles from El Patrón: La Victoria
- 1. "Feliz Navidad" Released: 2009; 2. "Te Pido Perdón" Released: 2010

El Patrón is the third studio album by Puerto Rican singer and songwriter Tito El Bambino, released on March 24, 2009, by Universal Music Latino. It was produced primarily by Monserrate with other contributions by Nérol, Marioso, Mambo Kingz, among others. El Patron was nominated for a Lo Nuestro Award for Urban Album of the Year. It also received a nomination for the Billboard Latin Music Award for Latin Rhythm Album of the Year in 2010. It sold 300,000 copies worldwide.

== Critical reception ==
Professional ratings
Review scores
Source	Rating
AllMusic	3.5/5 stars

In a mostly positive review, AllMusic writer, Jason Birchmeier says the album "finds him developing as an artist and experimenting with different styles without abandoning his reggaeton roots". He also went on to say that the album is a "solid effort filled with lots of good songs and a few excellent ones". He called "El Amor" the "most obvious stylistic experiment" and the "primary highlight", and said that it "showcases Tito's singing ability".

== Track listing ==
Standard edition
No.	Title	Length
1.	"El Amor"	4:07
2.	"Suéltate"	3:04
3.	"Mata"	4:58
4.	"Desnudarte"	2:56
5.	"Mi Cama Huele a Ti" (featuring Zion & Lennox)	3:45
6.	"Piropo"	3:13
7.	"Baila Sexy"	2:45
8.	"Perfumate"	2:36
9.	"Te Comencé a Querer"	3:28
10.	"Agárrala" (featuring Plan B)	4:22
11.	"Te Extraño"	3:32
12.	"Under"	2:43
13.	"Se Me Daña La Mente"	3:21
14.	"Somos Iguales"	3:31

== Special edition and re-edition ==
=== El Patrón: La Victoria ===
On January 26, 2010, through Siente Music, Tito "El Bambino" released a special re-edition of the album, called El Patron: La Victoria. It included a few new tracks, and new guest appearances by Jenni Rivera and La India.

El Patrón: La Victoria
No.	Title	Writer(s)	Producer	Length
1.	"Te Pido Perdón"	Efraín Fines	Nérol	2:51
2.	"Feliz Navidad"			3:26
3.	"El Amor"			4:07
4.	"Suéltate"			3:04
5.	"Mata"			4:58
6.	"Desnudarte"			2:56
7.	"Mi Cama Huele a Ti" (featuring Zion & Lennox)			3:45
8.	"Piropo"			3:13
9.	"Baila Sexy"			2:45
10.	"Te Comencé a Querer"			3:28
11.	"Agárrala" (featuring Plan B)			4:22
12.	"Te Extraño"			3:32
13.	"Somos Iguales"			3:30
14.	"El Amor (salsa version)" (featuring La India)			3:52
15.	"Mi Cama Huele A Ti (pop version)"			4:22
16.	"El Amor (remix)" (featuring Jenni Rivera)			4:08

El Patrón: La Victoria (special edition) – CD
No.	Title	Writer(s)	Producer	Length
17.	"Te Pido Perdón (banda version)" (featuring Banda El Recodo)	Efraín Fines	Nérol	2:51

El Patrón: La Victoria (special edition) – DVD (music videos)
No.	Title	Writer(s)	Producer	Length
1.	"Te Pido Perdón (banda version)" (featuring Banda El Recodo)	Efraín Fines	Nérol	3:02
2.	"Feliz Navidad"			3:29
3.	"El Amor"			4:22
4.	"Under"			2:50
5.	"El Amor (remix)" (featuring Jenni Rivera)			4:14

- The digital version doesn't include the songs "Feliz Navidad" and the banda version of "Te Pido Perdón". The songs "Under" and "Se Me Daña La Mente" were added even though the physical CD version of La Victoria edition didn't have them.

=== El Patrón: Invencible ===
In mid-2010, it had been confirmed that Tito "El Bambino" would release a new album, and that it will be a part two or three of his album, El Patrón. It was later released on February 8, 2010, through Siente Music, although instead of being a re-edition like La Victoria, it was more of different album with new songs and new guests appearances with new producers.

== Charts ==
Chart (2009)	Peak position
Mexican Albums Chart	1
US Billboard 200	138
US Billboard Top Rap Albums	21
US Billboard Top Latin Albums	1
US Billboard Latin Rhythm Albums	1
Venezuelan Albums (Recordland)	1

== Sales and certifications ==
Region	Certification	Certified units/sales
United States (RIAA)	2× Platinum (Latin)	200,000^{^}
^{^} Shipments figures based on certification alone.

== See also ==
- List of number-one Billboard Top Latin Albums of 2009
- List of number-one Billboard Latin Rhythm Albums of 2010

== Release history ==
List of release dates, showing country, record label, and catalog number
Region	Date	Format	Label	Catalog	Edition
United States	March 3, 2009	CD; digital download	Universal Latino; Siente	B001URKXPY	Standard
