= El Malo (song) =

Single by Aventura Remix featuring Sensato

from the album The Last
- Released: March 11, 2010
- Recorded: 2009
- Genre: Bachata
- Length: 3:58
- Label: Premium Latin Music
- Songwriter: Anthony "Romeo" Santos
- Producers: Lenny Santos; Anthony Santos; Henry Santos Jeter; Max Santos

Aventura singles chronology
"Dile al Amor" (2009)	"El Malo" (2010)	"El Desprecio" (2010)

Music video
- "El Malo" on YouTube

"El Malo" (English: The Bad Guy) is the fifth single released from Aventura's fifth and final studio album The Last (2009). The single was released on March 11, 2010, and reached #1 on Tropical Airplay. The music video was released on June 29, 2010. A remix was made with Sensato.

== Chart performance ==
At the time El Malo was released, the previous single by Aventura, Dile al Amor had dominated the charts in early 2010. El Malo was later re-released in mid-2010 where it peaked #2 on the Latin Tropical Airplay chart twice on July 10 and July 24 where the #1 position was being held off by Juan Luis Guerra's Bachata en Fukuoka. The single finally reached #1 on the Latin Tropical Airplay on the week of August 28, 2010. The single has also reached on the Top 10 on Top Latin Songs peaking at #5.

== Charts ==
=== Weekly charts ===
Chart (2010)	Peak position
Dominican Republic Airplay (Top Latino)	1
US Bubbling Under Hot 100 (Billboard)	16
US Hot Latin Songs (Billboard)	5
US Latin Pop Airplay (Billboard)	5
US Tropical Airplay (Billboard)	1

=== Year-end charts ===
Chart (2010)	Position
US Hot Latin Songs (Billboard)	11
US Tropical Airplay (Billboard)	5
Chart (2011)	Position
US Tropical Airplay (Billboard)	27
