= List of number-one Billboard Hot Latin Songs of 2009 =

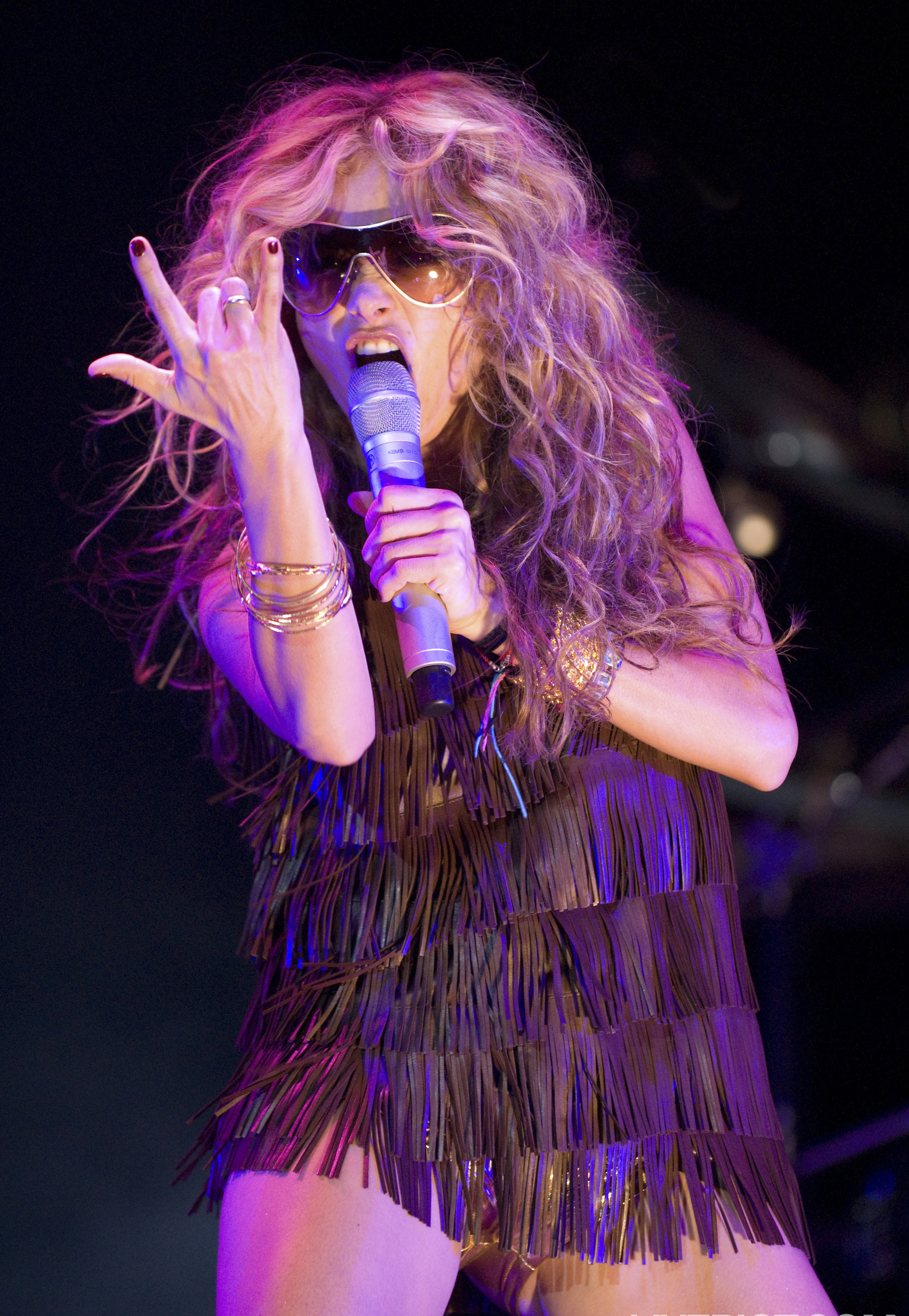
Mexican Pop singer Paulina Rubio's first single off her album, Gran City Pop, titled "Causa y Efecto" stayed at the top of the charts for 5 consecutive weeks becoming one of the four longest-running singles of the year, and the longest consecutive running single of the year.

The Billboard Hot Latin Tracks is a chart that ranks the best-performing Latin singles in the United States. Published by Billboard magazine, based collectively on each single's airplay. There were a total of 18 number-one Latin singles in 2009, although 19 claimed the top spot as Luis Fonsi's "No Me Doy Por Vencido" reached its peak position in 2008, and thus is excluded.

In 2009, six acts achieved their first U.S. number-one single either as a lead artist or a featured guest: Tito El "Bambino", Makano, Aleks Syntek, Noel Schajris, and Espinoza Paz. Nelly Furtado earned her first number-one Latin single as a solo artist in Spanish with "Manos Al Aire" from her first Spanish language album "Mi Plan". Luis Fonsi and Banda El Recodo each earned two number-one singles, while the duo Wisin & Yandel earned 3 number-one singles.

== Chart history ==
Issue date	Song	Artist(s)
January 3	"No Me Doy Por Vencido"	Luis Fonsi
January 10	"No Me Doy Por Vencido"	Luis Fonsi
January 17	"No Me Doy Por Vencido"	Luis Fonsi
January 24	"No Me Doy Por Vencido"	Luis Fonsi
January 31	"Por Un Segundo"	Aventura
February 7	"Por Un Segundo"	Aventura
February 14	"No Me Doy Por Vencido"	Luis Fonsi
February 21	"El Último Beso"	Vicente Fernández
February 28	"Te Presumo"	Banda el Recodo
March 7	"Te Presumo"	Banda el Recodo
March 14	"Te Presumo"	Banda el Recodo
March 21	"Me Estás Tentando"	DJ Nesty featuring Wisin & Yandel
March 28	"Te Presumo"	Banda El Recodo
April 4	"Dime Si Te Vas Con Él"	Flex
April 11	"Te Presumo"	Banda El Recodo
April 18	"Te Presumo"	Banda El Recodo
April 25	"Tú No Eres Para Mí"	Fanny Lú
May 2	"Tú No Eres Para Mí"	Fanny Lú
May 9	"Tú No Eres Para Mí"	Fanny Lú
May 16	"El Amor"	Tito El Bambino
May 23	"Te Amo"	Makano
May 30	"Te Amo"	Makano
June 6	"El Amor"	Tito El Bambino
June 13	"Aquí Estoy Yo"	Luis Fonsi featuring David Bisbal, Aleks Syntek and Noel Schajris
June 20	"Aquí Estoy Yo"	Luis Fonsi featuring David Bisbal, Aleks Syntek and Noel Schajris
June 27	"Causa y Efecto"	Paulina Rubio
July 4	"Causa y Efecto"	Paulina Rubio
July 11	"Causa y Efecto"	Paulina Rubio
July 18	"Causa y Efecto"	Paulina Rubio
July 25	"Causa y Efecto"	Paulina Rubio
August 1	"Abusadora"	Wisin & Yandel
August 8	"Lo Intentamos"	Espinoza Paz
August 15	"Lo Intentamos"	Espinoza Paz
August 22	"Lo Intentamos"	Espinoza Paz
August 29	"Loba"	Shakira
September 5	"Loba"	Shakira
September 12	"Manos al Aire"	Nelly Furtado
September 19	"Manos al Aire"	Nelly Furtado
September 26	"Manos al Aire"	Nelly Furtado
October 3	"Manos al Aire"	Nelly Furtado
October 10	"Loba"	Shakira
October 17	"Loba"	Shakira
October 24	"Loba"	Shakira
October 31	"Esclavo de Sus Besos"	David Bisbal
November 7	"Esclavo de Sus Besos"	David Bisbal
November 14	"Esclavo de Sus Besos"	David Bisbal
November 21	"Looking for Paradise"	Alejandro Sanz featuring Alicia Keys
November 28	"Esclavo de Sus Besos"	David Bisbal
December 5	"Looking for Paradise"	Alejandro Sanz featuring Alicia Keys
December 12	"Looking for Paradise"	Alejandro Sanz featuring Alicia Keys
December 19	"Gracias a Ti"	Wisin & Yandel featuring Enrique Iglesias
December 26	"Me Gusta Todo de Tí"	Banda El Recodo

== See also ==
- Top Latin Songs
