= Yo No Sé Mañana =

Song by Luis Enrique

Single by Luis Enrique

from the album Ciclos
- Released: March 23, 2009
- Recorded: 2008
- Genre: Salsa
- Length: 4:19 (salsa version); 3:51 (ballad version)
- Label: Top Stop
- Songwriters: Jorge Luis Piloto; Jorge Villamizar
- Producer: Bob Benozzo

Luis Enrique singles chronology
"En la Penumbra" (2007)	"Yo No Sé Mañana" (2009)	"Cómo Volver a Ser Feliz" (2009)

Audio sample
- "Yo No Sé Mañana": file; help

"Yo No Sé Mañana" (English: "I Don't Know Tomorrow") is a song performed by Nicaraguan-American salsa singer-songwriter Luis Enrique, released by Top Stop Music on March 23, 2009, as the first single from his 17th studio album Ciclos (2009). The song peaked at number six on the Top Latin Songs chart, his highest-peaking single since "Lo Que Es Vivir" in 1992, and it was his first number one single on the Latin Tropical Airplay chart since "Así Es La Vida" in 1994.

== Awards and nominations ==
The song received a Latin Grammy Award for Best Tropical Song and a nomination for Song of the Year. The song was nominated at the 2010 Lo Nuestro Awards for Tropical Song of the Year. The song was awarded a Billboard Latin Music award for "Tropical Airplay – Song of the Year".

== Charts ==
Chart (2009)	Peak position
Perú (UNIMPRO)	2
Netherlands (Dutch Top 40)	13
US Hot Latin Songs (Billboard)	6
US Latin Tropical Airplay (Billboard)	1
US Heatseekers Songs (Billboard)	42
Venezuela Record Report	1

== Certifications ==
Region	Certification	Certified units/sales
Mexico (AMPROFON)	Platinum	60,000^{*}
^{*} Sales figures based on certification alone.

== Christian Nodal version ==
"Yo No Sé Mañana"

Promotional single by Christian Nodal

from the album Me Dejé Llevar
- Released: July 14, 2017
- Genre: Mariachi bolero
- Length: 3:26
- Label: Fonovisa
- Songwriters: Jorge Luís Piloto; Jorge Villamizar

Mexican singer-songwriter Christian Nodal recorded "Yo No Sé Mañana" for his debut studio album, Me Dejé Llevar (2017), released as a promotional single from the album. Nodal's version was certified Gold (Latin) by the Recording Industry Association of America.

=== Certifications ===
Region	Certification	Certified units/sales
United States (RIAA) Christian Nodal cover	Gold (Latin)	30,000^{‡}
^{‡} Sales+streaming figures based on certification alone.

== Release history ==
Region	Date	Label
United States	March 23, 2009	Top Stop Music

== See also ==
- List of number-one Billboard Hot Tropical Songs of 2009
