= Patrulla 81 =

Mexican regional band

- Origin: Durango, Mexico
- Genres: Duranguense, Grupero
- Years active: 1981–present
- Labels: Garmex (1984-1994); Musart (1987-1990); Terrazas Records (2003-2004); Disa (2004-2008); Fonovisa (2009-2012); Cruz de Piedra Music (2020-Present)
- Members: José Ángel Medina Jr. 1996-present; José Ángel Medina III 2020-present; Enrique "Pollo" Facio 2010-2012, 2022-present; Gustavo Medina 2011-present; Miguel Medina 2014-present; Joel Olvera 2022-present; Bobby Sígala 2025-Present; Gerardo Vieyra 2023-Present; Marco Recendez 2024-Present
- Website: https://patrulla81.net/

Patrulla 81 is a regional Mexican band originally from the state of Durango. Group member José Ángel Medina formed the group in 1981. In 2004, the group released Cómo Pude Enamorarme de Ti, a hit in both the United States and Mexico. In December 2007, the band released a new album, A Mi Ley, featuring the single "Te Quiero Mucho." Patrulla 81's Quiéreme Más reached No. 1 on the Billboard Top Latin Albums chart in March 2009. In late 2009, the band released Sin Ti No Vive, which debuted on Billboard's Regional Mexican chart at No. 1.

On November 11, 2020, José Ángel Medina, vocalist and leader of Patrulla 81, died from complications of COVID-19. He had been battling the virus since October 16.

His son José Ángel Medina Jr. (known as Filo) as first-born, keyboardist and producer of Patrulla 81 for over 20 years took over the reins of the band.

== Discography ==
- 2004: Como Pude Enamorarme de Ti
- 2004: Soy de Durango: Sus Inicios Vol. 1
- 2004: En Vivo Desde Dallas, Texas
- 2005: Soy Duranguense 100%
- 2005: Divinas
- 2006: Como Me Haces Falta y Muchos Exitos Más
- 2006: Tierra Extraña
- 2006: 20 Reales Superexitos
- 2006: La Mejor de la Coleccion
- 2006: Los Super Exitos Payaso Loco
- 2007: Tu/Yo
- 2007: A Mi Ley
- 2007: En Concierto
- 2008: Corridos Duranguenses
- 2008: La Historia
- 2009: Quiéreme Más
- 2009: Sin Ti No Vivo
- 2009: Hola Soy Dora
- 2009: Seria Diamanta: 30 Súper Exitos
- 2009: Sus Mejores Exitos
- 2009: Coleccion Privada: Las 20 Exclusivas
- 2010: Te Pido Perdón
- 2011: Como El Fénix
- 2012: Se Supone
- 2012: Iconos: 25 Exitos
- 2013 (April): En Vivo
- 2013 (October): Quiero Saber de Ti
- 2014: Mi Amor
- 2017 Todo Se Paga
- 2021 Cultura Duranguense

Singles

- 2009 Quiéreme Más
- 2009 Sin Ti No Vivo
- 2011 A Veces
- 2012 Se Supone
- 2016 He Nacido Para Ti
- 2020 Ya No Puedo Olvidarte
- 2020 Pense
- 2020 Mi Virgen Ranchera
- 2021 Celoso (ft. Montéz de Durango)
- 2021 No Aprendí A Olvidar (ft. Montéz De Durango)
- 2021 ¿Que Voy Hacer?
- 2022 Amor y Lagrimas
- 2023 Sigue Viva
- 2025 Corazón Corazoncito
- 2026 No Puedes Mentir
- 2026 VIDA MIA
