= Su Veneno =

Single by Aventura

from the album The Last
- Released: June 30, 2009
- Recorded: 2009
- Genre: Bachata; bolero
- Length: 4:00 (Bachata version); 3:48 (Bolero version)
- Label: Premium Latin
- Songwriter: Anthony "Romeo" Santos
- Producers: Lenny Santos; Anthony Santos; Henry Santos Jeter; Max Santos

Aventura singles chronology
"All Up 2 You" (2009)	"Su Veneno" (2009)	"Dile al Amor" (2009)

Music video
- "Su Veneno (Bachata Version)" on YouTube "Su Veneno (Bolero Version)" on YouTube

"Su Veneno" (English: Her Poison) is American band Aventura's third single from their fifth and final studio album The Last (2009). The song spent four consecutive weeks at number-one on the tropical charts. A bolero version was made as well.

== Music video ==
"Su Veneno" has two different videos, a bachata and a bolero version.

== Chart performance ==
Chart (2009)	Peak position
Colombia (EFE)	9
Honduras (EFE)	1
U.S. Billboard Hot Latin Tracks	4
U.S. Billboard Latin Tropical Airplay	1
U.S. Billboard Heatseekers Songs	22

== See also ==
- List of number-one Billboard Hot Tropical Songs of 2009
- List of Billboard Latin Rhythm Airplay number ones of 2009
