= Dile al Amor =

"Dile Al Amor"

Single by Aventura

from the album The Last
- Released: October 13, 2009
- Recorded: 2009
- Genre: Bachata
- Length: 3:49
- Label: Premium Latin Music
- Songwriter: Anthony "Romeo" Santos
- Producer: Lenny Santos · Anthony Santos · Henry Santos Jeter · Max Santos

Aventura singles chronology
"Su Veneno" (2009)	"Dile Al Amor" (2009)	"El Malo" (2010)

Music video
- "Dile Al Amor" on YouTube

"Dile Al Amor" (English: Tell to the Love) is Aventura's fourth single from their fifth and final studio album The Last (2009). This was the second song from Aventura to reach number-one on Hot Latin Tracks.

== Music video ==
The music video was released on November 4, 2009. The video is Romeo having bad luck with love in his life, because of Cupid missing every arrow she throws.

== Charts ==
=== Weekly charts ===
Chart (2009–2010)	Peak position
Dominican Republic Airplay (Top Latino)	1
Mexican Airplay	1
Monitor Latino (Top 20 General)	1
Peru Airplay (UNIMPRO)	11
US Bubbling Under Hot 100 (Billboard)	2
US Hot Latin Songs (Billboard)	1
US Tropical Airplay (Billboard)	1
US Regional Mexican Airplay (Billboard)	36

=== Year-end charts ===
Chart (2010)	Position
US Hot Latin Songs (Billboard)	3

=== Decade-end charts ===
Chart (2010–2019)	Position
US Hot Latin Songs (Billboard)	29

== Certifications ==
Region	Certification	Certified units/sales
Spain (Promusicae)	Platinum	60,000^{‡}
^{‡} Sales+streaming figures based on certification alone.

== See also ==
- List of Billboard Latin Rhythm Airplay number ones of 2010
- List of number-one Billboard Tropical Songs of 2010
