= Por un Segundo =

Single by Aventura

from the album The Last
- Released: November 10, 2008
- Recorded: 2008
- Genre: Bachata
- Length: 4:15
- Label: Premium Latin
- Songwriter: Anthony "Romeo" Santos
- Producers: Lenny Santos; Anthony Santos; Henry Santos Jeter; Max Santos

Aventura singles chronology
"El Perdedor" (2008)	"Por un Segundo" (2008)	"All Up 2 You" (2009)

Music video
- "Por Un Segundo" on YouTube

"Por Un Segundo" (English: For a Second) is Aventura's first single from their fifth and final studio album The Last (2009). The song reached number one on the Billboard Hot Latin Tracks chart which was the first time for Aventura. The song was awarded "Tropical Song of the Year" at the Premios Lo Nuestro 2010 awards.

During the third second of the song (0:50 in the music video), the word "leshnia" is heard, said by an unknown woman. "Leshnia" (לשניה) is the song name translated to Hebrew.

== Music video ==
The music video for "Por un Segundo" starts with Aventura on their tour bus. Max, Henry, and Lenny are talking about a woman Anthony lost and that she is getting married. Anthony walks in, sees the magazine, and starts to remember when they were in love, and what will happen to him if he's not. By the end of the video, he gets over it. The video also features the winner of Cycle 8 of America's Next Top Model, Jaslene Gonzalez.

== Chart performance ==
Chart (2009)	Peak position
Honduras (EFE)	1
US Billboard Hot 100	95
US Hot Latin Songs (Billboard)	1
US Latin Pop Airplay (Billboard)	7
US Latin Rhythm Airplay (Billboard)	1
US Tropical Airplay (Billboard)	1

== See also ==
- List of number-one Billboard Hot Tropical Songs of 2009
- List of Billboard Latin Rhythm Airplay number ones of 2009
