= Chapter Dos: On the Verge =

Chapter Dos: On The Verge

Studio album by Xtreme
- Released: November 17, 2009
- Genre: Bachata
- Length: 48:57
- Label: Machete Music; Universal Music Latin Entertainment

Xtreme chronology
Chapter Dos (2008)	Chapter Dos: On The Verge (2009)	Los Subestimados (2011)

Singles from Chapter Dos: On the Verge
- 1. "Vuelve" Released: 2009; 2. "Baby, Baby" Released: September 29, 2009; 3. "Devuélveme La Navidad" Released: November 3, 2009

Chapter Dos: On the Verge is Xtreme's fourth bachata album. The album contained five new tracks, including the single "Vuelve". It also included two singles that peaked on the Billboard Tropical Airplay Chart, "Baby, Baby" which peaked at number 34, and "Devuélveme La Navidad" featuring Carlos & Alejandra which peaked at number 37. The album also contains 10 tracks from Chapter Dos, and the single "Shorty, Shorty" from Haciendo Historia. This album was either a sequel or a remake of the Chapter Dos album. On the Verge was a reality show that aired on Mun2 in 2009. The album is probably based on the reality show and the previous album.

== Track listing ==
No.	Title	Length
1.	"Vuelve"	3:45
2.	"Baby, Baby"	2:57
3.	"Devuélveme La Navidad" (featuring Carlos & Alejandra)	3:25
4.	"La Esquina De Don Andres (Paris Azul)"	2:54
5.	"Lloro y Lloro"	3:07
6.	"Through That Window (Enamorado Estoy)"	2:41
7.	"Su Ultimo Error"	3:26
8.	"Por Que Será"	3:19
9.	"Quisiera Ser"	3:06
10.	"Soundcheck" (Skit)	1:05
11.	"Super Fanática"	3:29
12.	"Te Recuerdas"	3:18
13.	"La Pesadilla"	4:08
14.	"Amigos Con Beneficios"	2:15
15.	"Friday Night" (feat YD)	2:59
16.	"Shorty, Shorty"	2:55
Total length:		48:57
