= List of awards and nominations received by Cristian Castro =

Cristian Castro awards and nominations
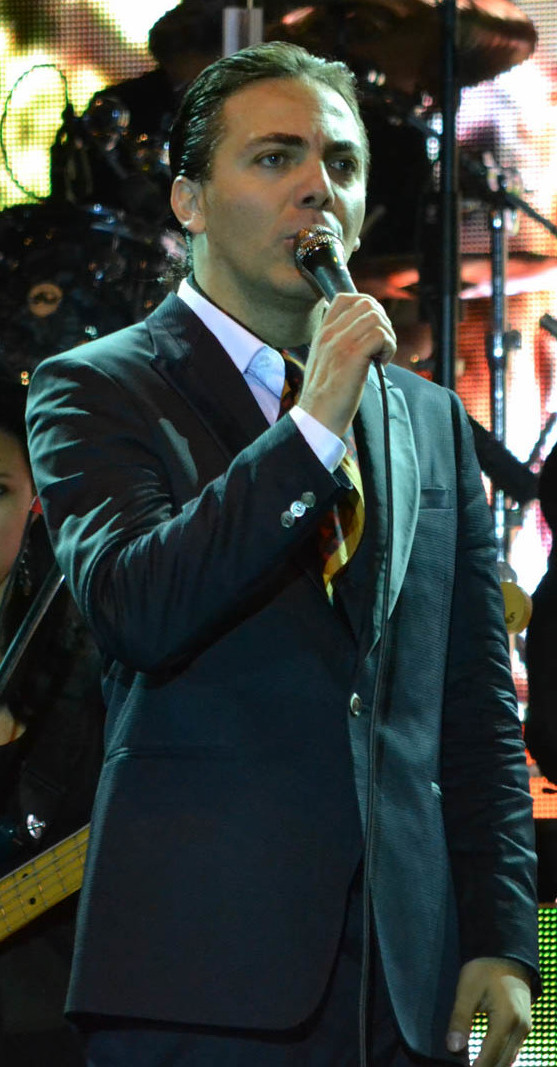
- Castro in 2015
Awards and nominations
Award	Wins	Nominations
Billboard Latin Music Awards	6	18
BMI Latin Awards	5	5
Grammy Awards	0	5
Latin Grammy Awards	0	2
Lo Nuestro Awards	4	21
Premios Juventud	0	3
Premios TVyNovelas	3	5
Premios Oye!	1	1

Totals (Note: Certain award groups do not simply award one winner. They acknowledge several different recipients, have runners-up, and have third place. Since this is a specific recognition and is different from losing an award, runner-up mentions are considered wins in this award tally. For simplification and to avoid errors, each award in this list has been presumed to have had a prior nomination.)
- Wins: 45
- Nominations: 95

Mexican pop singer and actor Cristian Castro is the recipient of various awards and nominations since his debut in media in the 1980s. Castro has sold over 12 million copies, making him one of the best-selling Latin music artists of all-time.

He achieved his first major awards as a child star with his role in Mame (1983), winning accolades on the El Heraldo de México Awards, Palmas de Oro and the Asociación Nacional de Críticos de Teatro de México. He won the Best Male Revelation for his acting in Las secretas intenciones (1992) at the Premios TVyNovelas.

As a singer, Castro garnered major awards and nominations with his debut album Agua Nueva (1992), including a Grammy Awards nomination for Best Latin Pop Performance, a Lo Nuestro Awards nomination as New Pop Artist of the Year, and was the recipient for TVyNovelas Awards and Premios Eres. Throughout the 1990s and since 2000s, Castro continued to achieve more awards and nominations, including Premios Juventud, Grammy Awards and Latin Grammy Awards, as well as various Billboard Latin Music Awards and BMI Latin Awards. His career has been recognized in Lo Nuestro Awards with a Young Lifetime Award, a Soberano International Awards and a BMI's Citation of Appreciation Award. He has also received a number of other special recognitions, including by mayors in Argentina and Peru.

== Awards and nominations ==
Award/organization (Note: Charts are not included, unless they are explicitly described as "awards" or specific trophies are given.)	Year	Nominee/work	Category	Result	Ref.
Asociación Nacional de Críticos de Teatro de México	1983	Cristian Castro (Mame)	Best Child Actor	Won	
Association of Latin Entertainment Critics (Latin ACE)	1997	No Puedo Apartarte de Mi	Best Album of the Year, Male	Nominated	
Billboard Latin Music Awards	1994	"Nunca Voy a Olvidarte"	Pop Song of the Year	Won	
Billboard Latin Music Awards	1996	"Vuélveme a Querer"	Hot Latin Song of the Year	Won	
Billboard Latin Music Awards	1998	"Lo Mejor de Mí"	Hot Latin Song of the Year	Won	
Billboard Latin Music Awards	1999	"Lo Mejor de Mí"	Hot Latin Song of the Year	Nominated	
Billboard Latin Music Awards	2000	Cristian Castro	Hot Latin Tracks Artist of the Year	Nominated	
Billboard Latin Music Awards	2000	Mi Vida Sin Tu Amor	Pop Album of the Year, Male	Nominated	
Billboard Latin Music Awards	2000	"Escondidos" (with Olga Tañón)	Hot Latin Tracks of the Year, Vocal Duo	Nominated	
Billboard Latin Music Awards	2001	Cristian Castro	Hot Latin Tracks Artist of the Year	Nominated	
Billboard Latin Music Awards	2001	"Por Amarte Así"	Latin Pop Track of the Year	Nominated	
Billboard Latin Music Awards	2002	Cristian Castro	Hot Latin Tracks Artist of the Year	Won	
Billboard Latin Music Awards	2002	Azul	Pop Album of the Year, Male	Nominated	
Billboard Latin Music Awards	2002	"Azul"	Latin Pop Airplay Track of The Year	Nominated	
Billboard Latin Music Awards	2003	Cristian Castro	Hot Latin Tracks Artist Of The Year	Nominated	
Billboard Latin Music Awards	2008	El Indomable	Regional Mexican Album of the Year, Male Solo Artist	Nominated	
Billboard Latin Music Awards	2012	Viva el Príncipe	Latin Album of the Year	Nominated	
Billboard Latin Music Awards	2012	Viva el Príncipe	Latin Pop Album of the Year	Nominated	
Billboard Latin Music Awards	2012	Cristian Castro	Latin Pop Albums Artist of the Year, Solo	Won	
Billboard Latin Music Awards	2012	Cristian Castro	Albums Artist of the Year, Male	Won	
BDSCertified Spin Award	2003	"Por Amarte Así"	50,000 Spins	Won	
BMI Latin Awards	2001	"Volver a amar"	Award-Winning Songs	Won	
BMI Latin Awards	2002	"Azul"	Award-Winning Songs	Won	
BMI Latin Awards	2007	"Te Buscaría"	Song List	Won	
BMI Latin Awards	2011	Cristian Castro	Special Citation of Appreciation	Honoree	
BMI Latin Awards	2011	"El Culpable Soy Yo"	Award-Winning Songs	Won	
Buhos de Oro (Golden Owls)	1993	Cristian Castro		Honoree	
Cadena Dial	2014	Cristian Castro	Dial Award	Won	
Casandra Awards	2009	Cristian Castro	Soberano International	Honoree	
El Heraldo de México Awards	1983	Cristian Castro (Mame)	Best Revelation	Won	
El Heraldo de México Awards	1996	Cristian Castro	Best Male Singer	Won	
Fan Choice Awards (Mexico) (Note: A Mexican fan-voted award.)	2015	Cristian Castro	Latin Pop Artist	Nominated	
Galardón a los Grandes (Mexico) (Note: An award given by Raul Velasco in Siempre en Domingo.)	1992	Cristian Castro		Won	
Galardón a los Grandes (Mexico)	1993	Cristian Castro	Special recognition	Honoree	
Galardón a los Grandes (Mexico)	2010	Cristian Castro	Pop Male Artist	Nominated	
Globo Awards (New York) (Note: transl. Globe Awards)	2000	Cristian Castro	Best Pop Male Artist	Won	
Grammy Awards	1993	Agua Nueva	Best Latin Pop Performance	Nominated	
Grammy Awards	1995	El Camino del Alma	Best Latin Pop Album	Nominated	
Grammy Awards	1998	Lo Mejor de Mí	Best Latin Pop Album	Nominated	
Grammy Awards	2002	Azul	Best Latin Pop Album	Nominated	
Grammy Awards	2008	El Indomable	Best Mexican/Mexican-American Album	Nominated	
Latin Grammy Awards	2007	El Indomable	Best Ranchero Album	Nominated	
Latin Grammy Awards	2011	Viva el Príncipe	Best Male Pop Vocal Album	Nominated	
Las Vegas International Press Association	2008	Cristian Castro	Máximo Orgullo Hispano	Honoree	
Lo Nuestro Awards	1993	Cristian Castro	New Pop Artist of the Year	Nominated	
Lo Nuestro Awards	1994	"Nunca Voy a Olvidarte"	Pop Song of the Year	Won	
Lo Nuestro Awards	1994	Cristian Castro	Pop Male Artist of the Year	Nominated	
Lo Nuestro Awards	1995	Cristian Castro	Pop Male Artist of the Year	Nominated	
Lo Nuestro Awards	1995	"Mañana, Mañana"	Pop Song of the Year	Nominated	
Lo Nuestro Awards	1995	El Camino del Alma	Pop Album of the Year	Nominated	
Lo Nuestro Awards	1996	Cristian Castro	Regional Mexican Male Artist of the Year	Won	
Lo Nuestro Awards	1997	Cristian Castro	Pop Male Artist of the Year	Nominated	
Lo Nuestro Awards	1998	"Lo Mejor de Mí"	Pop Song of the Year	Nominated	
Lo Nuestro Awards	1998	Lo Mejor de Mí	Pop Album of the Year	Nominated	
Lo Nuestro Awards	1998	"Si Tú Me Amaras"	Video of the Year	Nominated	
Lo Nuestro Awards	2000	Mi Vida Sin Tu Amor	Pop Album Artist of the Year	Nominated	
Lo Nuestro Awards	2000	Cristian Castro	Pop Male Artist of the Year	Nominated	
Lo Nuestro Awards	2000	Cristian Castro	Young Lifetime Award (Jovenes con Legado)	Honoree	
Lo Nuestro Awards	2001	Cristian Castro	Pop Male Artist of the Year	Nominated	
Lo Nuestro Awards	2002	Azul	Pop Album Artist of the Year	Nominated	
Lo Nuestro Awards	2002	"Azul"	Pop Song of the Year	Nominated	
Lo Nuestro Awards	2002	Cristian Castro	Pop Male Artist of the Year	Won	
Lo Nuestro Awards	2007	Cristian Castro	Pop Male Artist of the Year	Nominated	
Lo Nuestro Awards	2007	Días Felices	Pop Album of the Year	Nominated	
Lo Nuestro Awards	2007	"Amor Eterno"	Pop Song of the Year	Nominated	
Lunas del Auditorio	2012	Cristian Castro	Best Balada Singer	Won	
Lunas del Auditorio	2015	Cristian Castro	Best Balada Singer	Won	
MTV Millennial Awards	2014	Cristian Castro	Epicfail	Nominated	
National Auditorium of Mexico	2013	Cristian Castro	Paseo de La Luna Walk of Fame	Won	
Orgullosamente Latino Award	2006	"Amor eterno"	Best Latin Song	Shortlisted	
Palmas de Oro (Golden Palm)	1983	Cristian Castro (Mame)	Best Child Actor	Won	
Premios Eres	1993	Cristian Castro	Best Male Singer	Nominated	
Premios Eres	1993	Cristian Castro	Best New Solo Artist	Won	
Premios Eres	1993	Agua Nueva	Best Album	Nominated	
Premios Eres	1994	"Nunca Voy a Olvidarte"	Best Song of the Year	Won	
Premios Juventud	2004	Cristian Castro	Paparazzi's Favorite Target	Nominated	
Premios Juventud	2004	Cristian Castro And Gabriela Bo	Hottest Romance	Nominated	
Premios Juventud	2015	"La Malquerida" (with Jesús Navarro & Melissa Robles)	Best Telenovela Theme	Nominated	
Premio Maya Internacional (Argentina)	2023	Cristian Castro	Career Lifetime Award	Honoree	
Premios Oye!	2012	Cristian Castro	Best Solo Male Artist, Spanish-language	Won	
Premios Disco México	1993	"Para Ti"	National Balad Song, Male Artist	Won	
Premios Tú Música	1999	Cristian Castro	Best Balada Male Singer	Won	
Premios TVyNovelas	1993	Cristian Castro (Las secretas intenciones)	Best Male Revelation	Won	
Premios TVyNovelas	1993	Cristian Castro	Best Male Singer Revelation	Won	
Premios TVyNovelas	1994	Cristian Castro	Best Male Singer	Won	
Premios TVyNovelas	2013	"Corona de lágrimas"	Best Musical Theme	Nominated	
Premios TVyNovelas	2015	"Corona de lágrimas"	Best Musical Theme	Nominated	
Quiero Awards (Argentina)	2014	"Es Mejor Así" (featuring Reik)	Best Collaboration	Nominated	
Ritmo Latino Awards (Note: Also known as "Premio de la Gente" or Latin Music Fan Awards.)	2000	Cristian Castro	Pop Male Artist of the Year	Nominated	
Ritmo Latino Awards	2001	Mi Vida Sin Tu Amor	Album of the Year	Nominated	
Viña del Mar International Song Festival	2002	Cristian Castro	Antorcha de Plata (Silver Torch)	Silver	
Viña del Mar International Song Festival	2004	Cristian Castro	Antorcha de Plata (Silver Torch)	Silver	

== Other honors ==
List of state honors
Country	City/Gov./Entity	Year	Description	Status	Ref.
Argentina	Mayor Esteban Avilés	2024	Distinguished visitor of Villa Carlos Paz	Honoree	
Peru	Mayor Alfredo Zegarra Tejada	2017	Career Lifetime Award	Honoree	

List of plaques
Award/organization	Year	Nominee/work	Description	Result	Ref.
Sony Music	2016	Cristian Castro	Conmemorative plaque: 25 years of Career	Won	
Boca Juniors	2022	Cristian Castro	Special plaque	Won	
