= Bachata Number 1's, Vol. 2 =

Bachata #1's, Vol. 2

Compilation album by various artists
- Released: August 12, 2008
- Recorded: 1992–2008
- Genre: Bachata
- Length: 56:53
- Language: Spanish
- Label: Machete Music
- Producer: Anthony Santos, Lenny Santos, Ivy Queen, Edwin "EZP" Pérez, Marcos Sánchez

Various artists chronology
Bachata #1's (2007)	Bachata #1's, Vol. 2 (2008)	Bachata #1's, Vol. 3 (2010)

Bachata #1's, Vol. 2 is a compilation album released by Machete Music. The recording features tracks performed by several artist from the bachata genre, such as Aventura, Xtreme, Toby Love, Óptimo, Monchy & Alexandra, Leny, Domenic Marte, Zacarías Ferreíra, Frank Reyes, Carlos & Alejandra, Joe Veras, Yoskar "El Prabu Sarante", and Alex Bueno. It also features a bachata performed by Latin pop singer Luis Fonsi exclusive to this release.

Upon release, the album peaked at number twelve on the Billboard Top Latin Albums chart and number one on the Billboard Tropical Albums chart. It became the tenth best-selling Tropical Album of 2008 and 2009. Several songs included on this album were released as singles from their respective parent albums including Aventura's "Mi Corazoncito" and Toby Love's "Tengo Un Amor". The next installment of the Bachata #1's series was released in 2010.

== Background and repertoire ==
Aventura "Mi Corazoncito" (2006)
A 24-second sample of Aventura's R&B and bachata fusion "Mi Corazoncito" which topped Tropical and Latin Rhythm Airplay charts.

The Bachata #1's series is a collection of compilations of various artists centered on the genre of bachata. The first chapter in the series was released in 2007. A third volume, Bachata #1's, Vol. 3 was released in 2010 in the United States. Bachata #1's, Vol. 2 was released on August 12, 2008. "Mi Corazoncito", written by Anthony "Romeo" Santos and performed by Aventura, was released as the third and final single from the group's second live album, K.O.B. Live (2006). The song peaked at number fifteen on the Billboard Latin Pop Songs and number two on the Billboard Latin Songs charts, topping both the Billboard Tropical Songs and Billboard Latin Rhythm Songs charts, while an additional live version peaked at number ten on the Billboard Tropical Songs chart. The bachata-infused-R&B number, has been named one of their biggest hits along with "Los Infieles", "Un Beso", and "El Perdedor" among others. Xtreme's "Mientes" is originally from the duo's second studio album Haciendo Historia (2006), which also featured the group's R&B-leaning hit single "Shorty, Shorty". Puerto Rican Latin pop singer Luis Fonsi performs "Con Las Manos Vacías", a track exclusive to this release. "Tengo Un Amor" was written by Toby Love with additional composition by Edwin Perez who also handled production for the song. The song was written with Spanglish lyrics combining crunk hip hop with bachata. David Jefferies, while reviewing the parent album, called the song "an incredibly smooth, lush, and glittery ballad" while listing the song as a selected "Allmusic Pick". According to Billboard, the original version of the song is a "straightforward bachata song" while the remix, which is included on this release, with R.K.M & Ken-Y, known then as Rakim & Ken-Y provides "urban street cred".

Alex Bueno "Gotas De Pena" (1992)
A 30-second sample of the eldest track on the album "Gotas De Pena" performed by Alex Bueno originally in 1992.

The remix also features a verse by R.K.M where he raps to a rhythm of bachata infused with reggaetón, or bachaton. It peaked at number 100 on the Billboard Hot 100, sixty-nine on the Billboard Radio Songs, three on the Billboard Tropical Songs, and number two on the Billboard Latin Songs charts. The song also topped the Billboard Latin Rhythm Songs chart. Dominican bachata trio Óptimo impact the album with their debut single "Conéctate" from the album Óptimo FDL (2007). It was written by fellow bachata singer Watson Brazobán. It peaked at number fifty and eighteen on the Billboard Latin Songs and Billboard Tropical Songs charts respectively. "No Es Una Novela" by Monchy & Alexandra features pop-bachata ballad tempo with "romantic, slick, well-produced sound" as does the rest of compilation of hits Exitos y Más (2006), the parent album according to Evan Gutierrez of Allmusic. The song was released at the lead single in promotion of the album, which boosted sales of the compilation. It reached number twenty-nine on the Billboard Latin Songs chart, however topped the Billboard Tropical Songs chart. On his debut studio album One (2008), Dominican singer Leny covers "Pobre Corazón", originally performed by Puerto Rican singer Divino for reggaetón and bachata singer Ivy Queen's sixth studio album Sentimiento (2007). It was composed by Divino alongside Queen, who also produced the song with Marcos Sánchez. "Ya Que Te Vas a Ir", performed by Domenic Marte on his 2004 full-length album debut, Intimamente. Zacarías Ferreíra's "Es Tan Dificil" combines vallenato with bachata. Written by the Dominican composer Martín de León, "Quién Eres Tú" is performed by Frank Reyes on his fourth studio album Cuando Se Quiere Se Puede (2004) and reached a peak position of number seventeen on the Billboard Tropical Songs chart. Despite this, it has been named one of his biggest hits. "Explícame" is from Carlos & Alejandra's debut album La Introduccion (2009). It reached number thirty-two on the Billboard Tropical Songs chart. Joe Veras' "Intentalo Tú" appeared on Veras' ninth album Carta de Verano (2003). It reached number three on the Billboard Tropical Songs chart. "No Tengo Suerte En El Amor" by Yoskar "El Prabu Sarante" originates from his third album, 2002's No Es Casualidad, becoming a top-ten hit on the Billboard Tropical Songs chart. "Gotas de Pena" is the oldest track on the album, first appearing on the 1992 recording Exitos de Alex Bueno by Alex Bueno.

== Reception and commercial performance ==
Upon release, the recording debuted at number thirteen on the Billboard Top Latin Albums chart behind reggaeton singer Daddy Yankee's Talento De Barrio at number one for the issue date August 30, 2008. On the week of September 6, 2008, the album moved one position to number twelve. The following week of September 13, 2008, it fell to number fourteen before gradually following off the chart.

On the Billboard Tropical Albums chart, the album debuted at the top for the week of August 30, 2008 and dominated Tropical Album sales for four consecutive weeks. It charted simultaneously with the first installment in the Bachata #1's series which obtainted the number three spot. Bachata #1's, Vol. 2 became the tenth best-selling Tropical Album of 2008 and 2009.

== Track listing ==
No.	Title	Writer(s)	Performer(s)	Length
1.	"Mi Corazoncito"	Anthony Santos	Aventura	3:55
2.	"Mientes"	Michael Figueroa, Steven Tejada	Xtreme	3:41
3.	"Con Las Manos Vacías"	Daniel Cruz, Alejandro Jaén	Wason Brazoban	4:01
4.	"Tengo Un Amor" (Remix)	Octavio Rivera, Edwin Pérez, Gabriel Padilla	Toby Love featuring R.K.M & Ken-Y	4:21
5.	"Conéctate"	Watson Brazobán, Jorge Fonseca	Óptimo	3:30
6.	"No Es Una Novela"	Daniel Cruz	Monchy & Alexandra	3:40
7.	"Pobre Corazón"	Daniel Velazquez, Martha Pesante	Leny	4:15
8.	"Ya Que Te Vas A Ir"	Victor Reyes, Jaime Rovira	Domenic Marte	4:11
9.	"Es Tan Dificil"	Omar Geles	Zacarías Ferreíra	4:12
10.	"Quién Eres Tú"	Martín de León	Frank Reyes	4:22
11.	"Explícame"	Carlos Vargas	Carlos & Alejandra	3:39
12.	"Intentalo Tú"	Julian Guerrero	Joe Veras	4:05
13.	"No Tengo Suerte En El Amor"	Hector Peña	Yoskar "El Prabu Sarante"	4:00
14.	"Gotas De Pena"	Frantoni Santana	Alex Bueno	5:01
Total length:				56:53

== Charts ==
=== Weekly charts ===
Chart (2008)	Peak Position
US Top Latin Albums (Billboard)	12
US Tropical Albums (Billboard)	1

=== Yearly charts ===
Chart (2008)	Position
US Tropical Albums (Billboard)	10
Chart (2009)	Position
US Tropical Albums (Billboard)	10
