= Bachata Number 1's =

Bachata #1's

Compilation album by Various Artists
- Released: July 3, 2007
- Recorded: 1998–2007
- Genres: Bachata; R&B
- Length: 45:51
- Language: Spanish
- Label: Machete
- Producers: Anthony Santos; Lenny Santos; Sergio George; Franklin Romero

Various Artists chronology
| Bachata #1's (2007) | Bachata #1's, Vol. 2 (2008) |

Bachata #1's is a compilation album released by Machete Music on July 3, 2007. The album features several artists from the bachata genre, such as Xtreme, Aventura, Monchy & Alexandra, Alex Bueno, Frank Reyes, and Los Toros Band with production being handled by Anthony Santos, Lenny Santos, Sergio George and Franklin Romero among others. Musically, the album features musical arrangements combining bachata and R&B.

Upon release, the album peaked at number 139 on the Billboard 200, number six on the Billboard Latin Albums chart, and number one on the Billboard Tropical Albums chart. It became the seventh and second best-selling Tropical Album of 2007 and 2008 respectively. Several songs from the album were released as singles from their respective parent albums including Xtreme's "Shorty, Shorty" and "Un Beso" by Aventura. The second installment of the Bachata #1's series was released in 2008.

== Background and repertoire ==
The Bachata #1's series is a collection of compilations of various artists centered on the genre of bachata. Dominican duo Xtreme's "Shorty, Shorty" was released as the lead single from their second studio album, Haciendo Historia (2006). It debuted at number two on the Billboard Latin Songs chart, for the issue dated March 9, 2007. The song also managed to top the Billboard Tropical Songs chart. Musically, the song leans more toward Contemporary R&B. "Un Beso", written by Anthony "Romeo" Santos and performed by Aventura, was released as the fourth and final single from the group's fourth studio album, God's Project (2005). The song peaked at number six and two on the Billboard Latin Songs and Billboard Tropical Songs charts respectively. The bachata and R&B number, has been named one of their biggest hits along with "Los Infieles", "El Perdedor", and "Mi Corazoncito" among others. "Perdidos" performed by duo Monchy & Alexandra appears on their fourth studio album, Hasta El Fin (2004). It managed to make the Billboard Hot 100, peaking at number ninety-two on the chart. It topped the Billboard Tropical Songs chart and reached the number three spot on the Billboard Latin Songs chart. "Paso A Paso" is from the Alex Bueno album Bachata A Su Tiempo (1998). Monchy & Alexandra make their second appearance on the album with "Hasta El Fin" from the album of the same name. Nominated for a Billboard Latin Music Award and Premio Lo Nuestro for "Tropical Song of the Year", it peaked at number five on the Billboard Tropical Songs chart. "Te Extraño" is originally included on Xtreme's 2004 self-titled album. The song was the duo's first big hit in the United States. It reached number thirty-one on the Billboard Latin Songs chart and thirteen on the Billboard Tropical Songs chart. Aventura make another appearance with "Obsesión", from their second studio album We Broke The Rules (2002). It became popular in many countries, topping charts in Germany, France and Italy among others, with over 1.5 million sales. Following "Obsesión" is Frank Reyes with his 2006 single "Princesa" from his tenth major-label release Dosis de Amor (2005). It topped the Billboard Tropical Songs chart in 2006. "Dos Locos" by Monchy & Alexandra reached the top ten of the Billboard Tropical Songs chart. The subsequent track, "Hermanita" gives Aventura their third appearance the album and became a top ten single.

== Reception and commercial performance ==
Professional ratings
Review scores
| Source | Rating |
|---|---|
| Allmusic | (favorable) |

According to an editor for Allmusic, the 12-track collection contains material by artist performing in the Dominican-influenced genre of bachata, noting featured artist such as Aventura, Monchy & Alexandra, and Xtreme. He complimented "Aventura's light, lilting "Obsesion" and Xtreme's R&B-tinged "Te Extrano", naming them two highlights of the compilation. Musically, he noted the album's softer percussion and romanticism of its lyrics, which "are perfect for quieter moments on the dance floor."

Upon release, the album debuted at number 191 on the Billboard 200 for the week dated September 8, 2007. A week later, it fell off the chart and re-entered at number 171 for the week of September 22, 2007. It remained at that position the next week and in its fifth week fell to number 188. On the week dated October 20, 2007, the album rose 30 positions to number 158, only to again fall to number 170 the next issue. The following week, it rose 28 positions to number 142. In its ninth week, it rose another three positions to its peak position of number 139 for the week of November 10, 2007. It managed another week at number 161 and ended its reign on the chart at number 178, a week later. Bachata #1's debuted at number six and number one, respectively, on the Billboard Latin Albums and Billboard Tropical Albums charts. In August 2008, the album charted simultaneously on the latter, with the second installment in the Bachata #1's series, which had debuted atop of the chart. It obtained the number three position.

== Track listing ==
| No. | Title | Writer(s) | Performer(s) | Length |
|---|---|---|---|---|
| 1. | "Shorty, Shorty" | Danny Mejia | Xtreme | 2:56 |
| 2. | "Un Beso" | Anthony Santos | Aventura | 4:23 |
| 3. | "Perdidos" | Daniel Cruz, Jaime Rovira | Monchy & Alexandra | 4:27 |
| 4. | "Paso A Paso" | Ramon Cordero | Alex Bueno | 3:58 |
| 5. | "Hasta El Fin" | Cruz, Rovira | Monchy & Alexandra | 4:13 |
| 6. | "Te Extraño" | Mejia | Xtreme | 3:34 |
| 7. | "Obsesión" | Santos | Aventura | 4:11 |
| 8. | "Princesa" | Francisco Reyes | Frank Reyes | 3:24 |
| 9. | "Dos Locos" | Cruz, Rovira | Monchy & Alexandra | 4:05 |
| 10. | "Hermanita" | Santos | Aventura | 4:35 |
| 11. | "Honey, I Do" | Meija | Xtreme | 3:50 |
| 12. | "Querube" | Pedro Flores | Los Toros Band | 2:15 |
| Total length: | | | | 45:51 |

== Charts ==
=== Weekly charts ===
| Chart (2007) | Peak Position |
|---|---|
| US Billboard 200 | 139 |
| US Latin Albums (Billboard) | 6 |
| US Tropical Albums (Billboard) | 1 |

=== Yearly charts ===
| Chart (2007) | Position |
|---|---|
| US Latin Albums (Billboard) | 38 |
| US Tropical Albums (Billboard) | 7 |
| Chart (2008) | Position |
| US Latin Albums (Billboard) | 18 |
| US Tropical Albums (Billboard) | 2 |

== See also ==
- List of number-one Billboard Tropical Albums from the 2000s
