= Bachata Number 1's, Vol. 3 =

2010 compilation album by Various Artists

Bachata #1's, Vol. 3

Compilation album by Various Artists
- Released: March 30, 2010
- Recorded: 2006–2010
- Genre: Bachata
- Length: 44:20
- Language: Spanish
- Label: Machete Music
- Producers: Anthony Santos, Lenny Santos, Monserrate & DJ Urba, Ivy Queen, Los Magnificos, Polo Parra, Juan Luis Guzman, Irving Menendez

Various Artists chronology
Bachata #1's, Vol. 2 (2008)	Bachata #1's, Vol. 3 (2010)	Bachata #1's, Vol. 4 (2011)

Bachata #1's, Vol. 3 is a compilation album released by Machete Music on March 30, 2010. The album includes tracks recorded by several artists from the bachata genre, such as Aventura, Héctor Acosta, Xtreme, Ivy Queen, Grupo Rush, Andy Andy, Carlos & Alejandra, and Marcy Place. It also features select bachata versions of songs by reggaetón and Latin pop artists including R.K.M & Ken-Y, Alejandro Fernández, Luis Fonsi, and Cristian Castro.

Upon release, the album peaked at number forty-one on the Billboard Latin Albums chart and number four on the Billboard Tropical Albums chart. It became the twentieth best-selling Tropical Album of 2010. Several songs included on the album were released as singles from their respective parent albums including the opening "El Perdedor" by Aventura, "No Me Doy Por Vencido" by Luis Fonsi, and "Dime" by Ivy Queen. The fourth volume in the Bachata #1's series was released in 2011.

== Background and repertoire ==
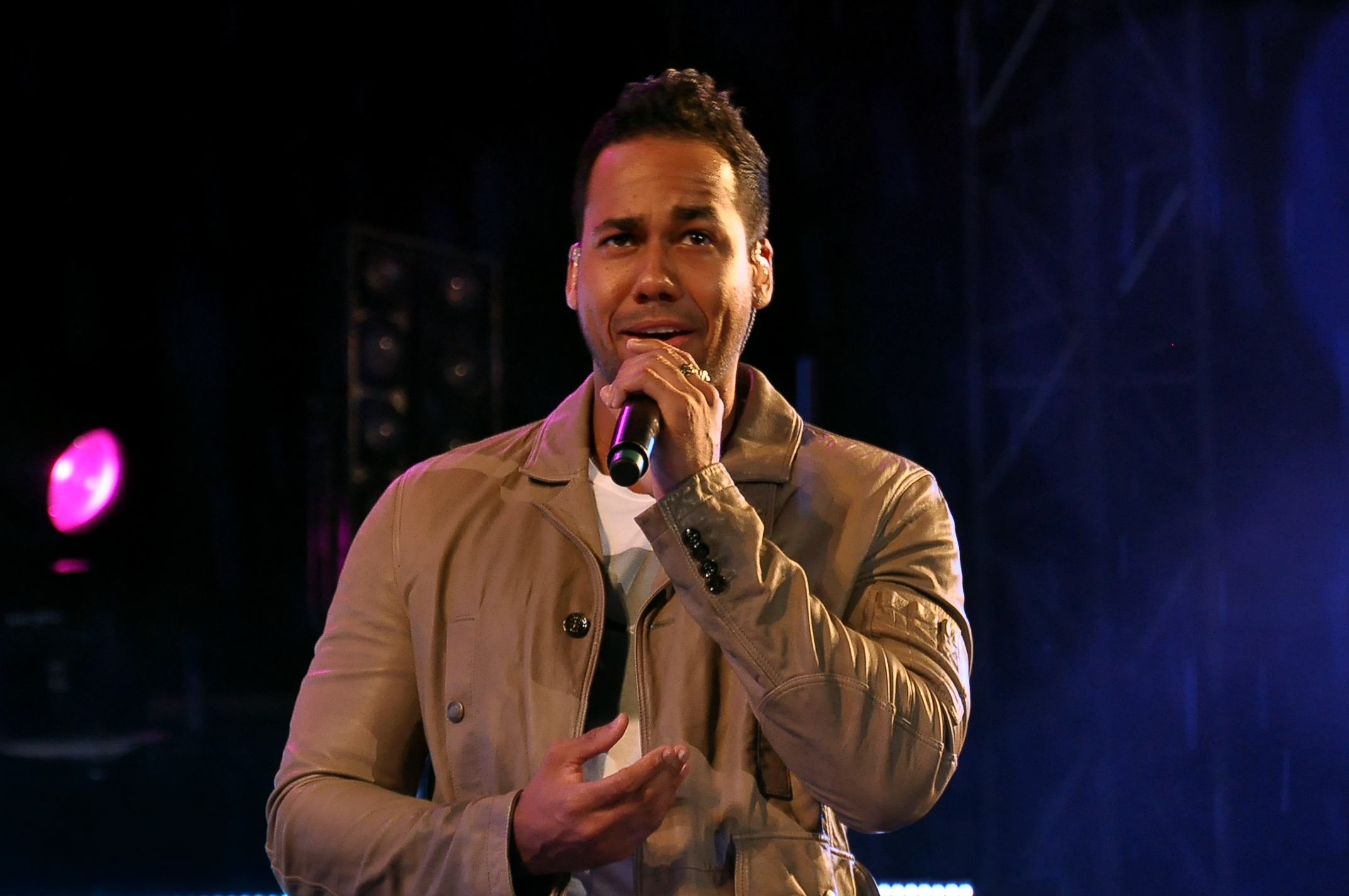
Lead singer of Aventura, Romeo Santos (pictured) wrote "El Perdedor".

The Bachata #1's series are several compilation albums of various artists centered on the genre of bachata. The first two in the series were released in 2008 and 2009, respectively. Bachata #1's, Vol. 3 was released by Machete Music digitally and physically on March 30, 2010 in the United States. "El Perdedor", written by Anthony "Romeo" Santos and performed by Aventura, was released as the third and final single from the group's second live album, K.O.B. Live (2006). The song peaked at number five on the Billboard Latin Songs chart, topping both the Billboard Tropical Songs and Billboard Latin Rhythm Songs charts. The bachata-infused-R&B number has been named one of their biggest hits along with "Los Infieles", "Un Beso", and "Mi Corazoncito" among others.

The second track, "Se Me Va La Voz" by Mexican singer Alejandro Fernández was released as the lead single from his fourteenth studio album Dos Mundos: Evolución (2009). It was named the highlight of the album by Jason Birchmeier of Allmusic. It topped the Billboard Latin Songs, Billboard Latin Pop Songs, and Billboard Tropical Songs charts. The bachata version, which is included on this release, features Héctor Acosta "El Torito". "No Me Doy Por Vencido" is originally from Puerto Rican singer Luis Fonsi's seventh studio album Palabras Del Sliencio (2008), which includes "unexpected musical styles" including the ranchera accents that can be found on "No Me Doy Por Vencido" and its "breathtaking chorus". It topped the Billboard Latin Songs, Tropical Songs, and Latin Pop Songs charts. Xtreme performs "Lloro y Lloro" from their second studio album Chapter Dos (2008). It, along with the album, takes influence of contemporary hip-hop and R&B. "Dime" was written by Puerto Rican singer Ivy Queen along with the producers Monserrate & DJ Urba. It was serviced to radio as the lead single from Queen's first live album, Ivy Queen 2008 World Tour LIVE! (2008) in both bachaton and bachata versions. It peaked at number eight on the Billboard Latin Songs chart, number four on the Billboard Tropical Songs chart, and number one on the Billboard Latin Rhythm Songs chart. It spent seven consecutive weeks atop the chart.

Héctor Acosta's "Sin Perdon" originates from his second studio album Mitad/Mitad (2008). It reached twenty-six on the Billboard Latin Songs chart, however topped the Billboard Tropical Songs chart. "Jasmine" is performed Dominican bachata group Grupo Rush's, which is composed of Damian, Migz, Lenny, and Khriz. It is a single from their debut album We On Fire (2009). The song became a top ten hit on the Billboard Tropical Songs chart. Dominican Bachata singer Andy Andy performs "Agua Pasada" which is from his seventh studio album Placer y Castigo (2009). It reached number eleven on the Billboard Tropical Songs chart. Puerto Rican reggaetón duo R.K.M & Ken-Y recorded "Vicio Del Pecado" in bachata in collaboration with Héctor Acosta, who makes his third appearance on this release. It was previously featured on the duo's second studio effort, The Royalty: La Realeza (2008). Carlos & Alejandra's "Cuanto Duele" appears on their debut album La Introduccion (2009) and the tenth track on this release. It reached number six on the Billboard Tropical Songs chart. "El Culpable Soy Yo" by Cristian Castro is from the album of the same name. It reached the top ten of both the Billboard Latin Songs and Tropical Songs chart. "Dame Un Chance (Nena)" is performed by urban bachata group Marcy Place from their debut album B From Marcy Place (2008). It peaked at number twenty-three on the Billboard Tropical Songs chart.

== Reception and commercial performance ==
Upon release, the album debuted at number forty-five on the Billboard Top Latin Albums chart for the week of April 17, 2010. Sales increased slightly and the album rose two positions to number forty-one for the week of April 24, 2010 It spent an additional week at that position before falling to number fifty-six, two weeks later on the issue date May 15, 2010. In its sixth week, the album again fell to number seventy. The recording ended its reign on the chart a week later at number seventy-four for the issue dated May 29, 2010.

On the Billboard Tropical Albums chart, the album debuted at number five behind Aventura's The Last, El Gran Combo de Puerto Rico's Sin Salsa No Hay Paraiso, Prince Royce's debut studio album and Ciclos by Luis Enrique for the week of April 17, 2010. In its second week, it rose to number four replacing Ciclos. It remained at the number four spot for four weeks. It spent nine weeks within the top ten of the chart. Bachata #1's, Vol. 3 became the twentieth best-selling Tropical Album of 2010. Five of the songs included on this release are number-one singles, these include "El Perdedor", "Se Me Va La Voz", "No Me Doy Por Vencido", "Dime", and "Sin Perdon".

== Track listing ==
- Track listing adapted from the album liner notes.

No.	Title	Writer(s)	Performer(s)	Length
1.	"El Perdedor"	Anthony Santos	Aventura	3:35
2.	"Se Me Va La Voz" (Bachata Version)	Roy Tabare	Alejandro Fernández featuring Héctor Acosta	3:16
3.	"No Me Doy Por Vencido" (Bachata Version)	Claudia Brant, Luis Fonsi	Luis Fonsi	3:49
4.	"Lloro y Lloro"	Steven Tejada	Xtreme	3:08
5.	"Dime"	Martha Pesante, Urbani Cedeño, Michael Monserrate	Ivy Queen	3:42
6.	"Sin Perdon"	Jorge Celedón	Héctor Acosta	4:06
7.	"Jasmine"	Edwin Garcia, Gabriel Gomez, Miguel Angel Perez	Grupo Rush	3:23
8.	"Agua Pasada"	Osmany Espinosa	Andy Andy	3:36
9.	"Vicio Del Pecado"	Juan Luis Guzman, Jose Nieves, Rafael Pina, Kenny Vazquez	R.K.M & Ken-Y featuring Héctor Acosta	3:57
10.	"Cuanto Duele"	Carlos Vargas	Carlos & Alejandra	3:32
11.	"El Culpable Soy Yo" (Bachata Version)	Gloria Espana	Cristian Castro featuring Carlos & Alejandra	4:04
12.	"Dame Un Chance (Nena)"	Juan Carlos Cabrera	Marcy Place	3:56
Total length:				44:20

== Charts ==
=== Weekly charts ===
Chart (2009)	Peak Position
US Top Latin Albums (Billboard)	41
US Tropical Albums (Billboard)	4

=== Yearly charts ===
Chart (2009)	Peak Position
US Tropical Albums (Billboard)	20

== Release history ==
Region	Date	Format	Label
Canada	March 30, 2010	Import	Machete Music
Germany	March 30, 2010	Import	Machete Music
France	March 30, 2010	Import	Machete Music
Italy	March 30, 2010	Import	Machete Music
Spain	March 30, 2010	CD, Import	Machete Music
United Kingdom	March 30, 2010	CD, Import	Machete Music
United States	March 30, 2010	CD, Digital download	Machete Music
