= Bachata Number 1's (disambiguation) =

Bachata Number 1's may refer to:

- Bachata Number 1's, 2007 compilation album
- Bachata Number 1's, Vol. 2, 2008 compilation album
- Bachata Number 1's, Vol. 3, 2010 compilation album
- Bachata #1's, Vol. 4, 2011 compilation album
- Bachata #1's, Vol. 5, 2011 compilation album

== See also ==
- Bachata Romántica: 1's, 2009 compilation album
- Bachata (disambiguation)
