= 2008 Latin Billboard Music Awards =

Annual American music awards ceremony

2008 Billboard Latin Music Awards
- Date: April 10, 2008
- Venue: Seminole Hard Rock Hotel & Casino, Hollywood, Florida

The 2008 Billboard Latin Music Awards, produced and broadcast live on Telemundo, was held on Thursday, April 10, 2008. The award show aired on Telemundo at 7pm EST.

The following list is the 2008 Billboard Latin Music Award Nominees and Winners (Winners are in bold)

== Host ==
- Aylín Mújica
- Alan Tacher

== Performers ==
- Ricardo Montaner, Olga Tañón, Noel Schajris, Yuridia, Diana Reyes, Víctor Manuelle - Opening Act All Together
- Enrique Iglesias - (Sang Donde Estan Corazon & Dimelo)
- Conjunto Primavera
- Juan Luis Guerra - (Sang Como Yo)
- Kany García, Belanova & Fanny Lu - (Kany García sang Hoy Ya Me Voy) (Fanny Lu sang Y Si Te Digo)
- Alejandro Fernández
- Aventura - (Sang Los Infieles y Mi Corazoncito)
- Marco Antonio Solís
- Camila with Alexis & Fido - (Sang Yo Quiero)
- A.B. Quintanilla & Kumbia All Starz with Melissa Jiménez from Universal Studios Hollywood, Ca - (Sang Rica Y Apretadita)
- Juanes - (Sang Gotas De Agua Dulce)
- La Arrolladora Banda El Limón & Alacranes Musical
- Wisin & Yandel - (Sang Ahora Es)
- Lucero (tribute to José Alfredo Jiménez)
- Chayanne - (Sang Lola) Closing Act

== Special awards ==
=== Lifetime achievement award ===
- Conjunto Primavera

=== Spirit of Hope Award ===
- Juanes

=== Your World Award (Premio Tu Mundo) ===
- RBD

== Hot Latin Songs of the Year ==
=== Hot Latin Song of the Year ===
- **Mi Corazoncito - Aventura**
- No Te Veo - Casa de Leones
- Dimelo - Enrique Iglesias
- Me Enamora - Juanes

=== Vocal Duet or Collaboration ===
- Impacto - Daddy Yankee featuring Fergie
- Te Lo Agradezco, Pero No - Alejandro Sanz featuring Shakira
- Siente El Boom - Tito El Bambino featuring Randy
- **Pegao - Wisin & Yandel featuring Los Vaqueros**

=== Artist of the Year ===
- **Juan Luis Guerra Y 440**
- Enrique Iglesias
- Maná
- Wisin & Yandel

== Latin Pop Albums ==
=== Latin Album of the Year ===
(New Category)

- Todo Cambió - Camila
- **El Cartel: The Big Boss - Daddy Yankee**
- Como Ama Una Mujer - Jennifer Lopez
- Wisin vs. Yandel: Los Extraterrestres - Wisin & Yandel

=== Male ===
- Quien Dijo Ayer - Ricardo Arjona
- Papito - Miguel Bosé
- Viento A Favor - Alejandro Fernández
- **La Vida... Es un Ratico - Juanes**

=== Female ===
- **Como Ama Una Mujer - Jennifer Lopez**
- Demasiado Fuerte - Yolandita Monge
- Real - Ednita Nazario
- Habla El Corazón - Yuridia

=== Duo or Group ===
- **Todo Cambió - Camila**
- Pasajero - Gypsy Kings
- Empezar Desde Cero - RBD
- Pasado - Sin Bandera

=== New Artist ===
- No Hay Espacio - Black Guayaba
- **Cualquier Dia - Kany García**
- Con Mi Soledad - Juan
- Kingcallero Del Amor - Gustavo Laureano

== Top Latin Albums Artist of the Year ==
- Aventura
- **Valentín Elizalde**
- Vicente Fernández
- Marco Antonio Solís

== Latin Rock/Alternative Album of the Year ==
- Fantasía Pop - Belanova
- No Hay Espacio - Black Guayaba
- Sí No - Café Tacuba
- **La Radiolina - Manu Chao**

== Tropical Album of the Year ==
=== Male ===
- **El Cantante - Marc Anthony**
- Una Navidad A Mi Estilo - Víctor Manuelle
- Canciones Clasicas De Marco Antonio Solís - Tito Nieves
- Contraste - Gilberto Santa Rosa

=== Female ===
- **90 Millas - Gloria Estefan**
- Lagrimas Calidas - Fanny Lu
- Exitos En 2 Tiempo

=== Duo Or Group ===
- Kings of Bachata: Sold Out at Madison Square Garden - Aventura
- **La Llave de Mi Corazón - Juan Luis Guerra Y 440**
- Los 4 Fantasticos - Karis
- United We Swing - Spanish Harlem Orchestra

=== New Artist ===
- En Primera Plana - Isaac Delgado
- **Mi Parranda - Andrés Jiménez: El Jibaro**
- Lagrimas Calidas - Fanny Lu

== Regional Mexican Album of the Year ==
=== Male Solo Artist ===
- El Indomable - Cristian Castro
- Te Va A Gustar - El Chapo de Sinaloa
- **Lobo Domesticado - Valentín Elizalde**
- Para Siempre - Vicente Fernández

=== Male Duo or Group ===
- Ahora Y Siempre - Alacranes Musical
- Recio, Recio Mis Creadorez - Los Creadorez Del Pasito Duraguense De Alfredo Ramirez
- **Agarrese - Grupo Montéz de Durango**
- Capaz de Todo Por Tí - K-Paz de la Sierra

=== Female Group or Female Solo Artist ===
- Promesas No - Graciela Beltrán
- Te Voy A Mostrar - Diana Reyes
- **La Diva En Vivo" - Jenni Rivera**
- Mi Vida Loca - Jenni Rivera

=== New Artist ===
- Con Los Ojos Cerrados - Aliados De La Sierra
- **Recio, Recio Mis Creadorez - Los Creadorez Del Pasito Duraguense De Alfredo Ramirez**
- El Regreso De Los Reyes - Cruz Martínez Presenta Los Super Reyes
- Voy A Convecerte - Los Primos De Durango

== Latin Pop Airplay Song of the Year ==
=== Male ===
- **Si Nos Quedara Poco Tiempo - Chayanne**
- Te Voy A Perder - Alejandro Fernández
- Dimelo - Enrique Iglesias
- Me Enamora - Juanes

=== Female ===
- Hoy Ya Me Voy - Kany García
- Que Hiciste - Jennifer Lopez
- **Eres Para Mi - Julieta Venegas**
- Como Yo Nadie Te Ha Amado - Yuridia

=== Duo or Group ===
- Me Muero - La 5ª Estación
- **Todo Cambio - Camila**
- Bendita Tu Luz - Maná featuring Juan Luis Guerra
- Ojalá Pudiera Borrarte - Maná

=== New Artist ===
- Ayer - Black Guayaba
- **Hoy Ya Me Voy - Kany García**
- Que Nos Paso - Kany García
- Enamorado - Gustavo Laureano

== Tropical Airplay Song of the Year ==
=== Male ===
- Mi Gente - Marc Anthony
- Dime Que Falto - Zacarias Ferreira
- **Mas Que Tu Amigo - Tito Nieves**
- En El Amor - Joe Veras

=== Female ===
- **No Llores - Gloria Estefan**
- No Te Pido Flores - Fanny Lu
- Y Si Te Digo - Fanny Lu
- Flaca O Gordita - Olga Tañón

=== Duo or Group ===
- **Mi Corazoncito - Aventura**
- La Llave de Mi Corazón - Juan Luis Guerra Y 440
- Que Me Des Tu Cariño - Juan Luis Guerra Y 440
- La Travesía - Juan Luis Guerra Y 440

=== New Artist ===
- Me Voy - Hector Acosta
- Quizas - Tony Dize
- No Te Pido Flores - Fanny Lu
- **Y Si Te Digo - Fanny Lu**

== Regional Mexican Airplay Song of the Year ==
=== Male Solo Artist ===
- **A Ti Si Puedo Decirte - El Chapo de Sinaloa**
- Estos Celos - Vicente Fernández
- Chuy Y Mauricio - El Potro De Sinaloa
- Eso Y Mas - Joan Sebastian

=== Male Group ===
- Por Amarte Así - Alacranes Musical
- **De Ti Exclusivo - La Arrolladora Banda El Limón**
- Mil Heridas - Cuisillos
- Lagrimas Del Corazon - Grupo Montéz de Durango

=== Female Group Or Female Solo Artist ===
- Es Cosa De El - Graciela Beltrán
- Como Te Va Mi Amor - Los Horóscopos de Durango
- Ahora Que Estuviste Lejos - Jenni Rivera
- **Mirame - Jenni Rivera**

=== New Artist ===
- **Cada Vez Que Pienso En Ti - Los Creadorez Del Pasito Duraguense De Alfredo Ramirez**
- Te Pido Que Te Quedes - Los Creadorez Del Pasito Duraguense De Alfredo Ramirez
- Tal Vez - Los Primos De Durango
- Paz En Este Amor - Fidel Rueda

== Latin Tour of the Year ==
- Vicente Fernández
- **Maná**
- Ricky Martin
- RBD

== Reggaeton ==
=== Album of the Year ===
- **El Cartel: The Big Boss - Daddy Yankee**
- Sentimiento - Ivy Queen
- Wisin vs. Yandel: Los Extraterrestres - Wisin & Yandel
- The Perfect Melody - Zion

=== Song of the Year ===
- No Te Veo - Casa de Leones
- Ayer La Vi - Don Omar
- Sola - Hector El Father
- **Igual Que Ayer - R.K.M & Ken-Y**

== Other Latin ==
=== Latin Ringtone of the Year ===
- Caballo Prieto Azabache - Antonio Aguilar
- Te Quise Olvidar - Grupo Montéz de Durango
- **Me Matas - R.K.M & Ken-Y**
- Hips Don't Lie - Shakira featuring Wyclef Jean

=== Latin Ringmaster of the Year ===
(New Category)

- Mi Corazoncito - Aventura
- **Lean Like A Cholo - Down AKA Kilo**
- Me Enamora - Juanes
- Si Dios Fuera Ilegal - Los Rehenes

=== Latin Dance Club Play Track of the Year ===
- **Whine Up - Kat DeLuna featuring Elephant Man**
- Do You Know? (The Ping Pong Song)/Dimelo - Enrique Iglesias
- Que Lloren - Ivy Queen
- Qué Hiciste - Jennifer Lopez

=== Latin Rap/Hip-Hop Album of the Year ===
- Atrevete - Jae-P
- Encuentros Musicales - Jae-P/Kinto Sol
- 15 Rayos - Kinto Sol
- **Los Hijos Del Maiz - Kinto Sol**

=== Latin Greatest Hits Album of the Year ===
- La Historia...Lo Mas Chulo, Chulo, Chulo - Los Caminantes
- **Historia De Un Idolo, Vol. 1 (Special Edition) - Vicente Fernández**
- La Historia Continua...Parte III - Marco Antonio Solís
- La Mejor...Coleccion - Marco Antonio Solís

=== Latin Compilation Album of the Year ===
- 30 Bachatas Pegaditas: Lo Nuevo Y Lo Mejor De 2007 - Various Artists
- **Bachata #1's - Various Artists**
- Now Latino 3 - Various Artists
- Top Latino V3 - Various Artists

=== Latin Jazz Album of the Year ===
- Hi-Lo Split - Marc Antione
- Raise Your Hand - Poncho Sanchez
- I'm Here - Ricardo Scales
- **The New Bossa Nova - Luciana Souza**

=== Latin Christian/Gospel Album of the Year ===
- Inolvidable - Julissa
- **Tu Amor - Danilo Montero**
- Gotta Have Musica Cristiana 2 - Various Artists
- Sinfonía del Alma - Marcos Witt

== People ==
=== Songwriter of the Year ===
- Juan Luis Guerra
- Anthony "Romeo" Santos
- Joan Sebastian
- **Marco Antonio Solís**

=== Producer of the Year ===
- **Juan Luis Guerra**
- Jesus Guillen
- Marco Antonio Solís
- Ernesto Perez Zagaste (El Chapo de Sinaloa)

== Labels ==
=== Publisher of the Year ===
- ARPA, BMI
- CRISMA, ASCAP
- **Sony/ATV Discos, ASCAP**
- WB Music, ASCAP

=== Publishing Corporation of the Year ===
- **EMI Music**
- Sony/ATV Music
- Universal Music
- Warner/Chappell Music

=== Hot Latin Songs Label of the Year ===
- EMI Televisa
- Fonovisa
- **Sony BMG Norte**
- Universal Latino

=== Top Latin Albums Label of the Year ===
- Machete
- Sony BMG Norte
- **UG**
- Universal Latino

=== Latin Pop Airplay Label of the Year ===
- EMI Televisa
- **Sony BMG Norte**
- Universal Latino
- Warner Latina

=== Tropical Airplay Label of the Year ===
- EMI Televisa
- Machete
- **Sony BMG Norte**
- Universal Latino

=== Regional Mexican Airplay Label of the Year ===
- Disa
- Edimonsa
- **Fonovisa**
- Univision

=== Latin Rhythm Airplay Label of the Year ===
- **Machete**
- Sony BMG Norte
- Universal Latino
- Universal Motown

=== Latin Pop Albums Label of the Year ===
- EMI Televisa
- **Sony BMG Norte**
- UG
- Universal Latino

=== Tropical Albums Label of the Year ===
- EMI Televisa
- **Sony BMG Norte**
- UG
- Universal Latino

=== Regional Mexican Albums Label of the Year ===
- Machete
- Sony BMG Norte
- **UG**
- Universal Latino

=== Latin Rhythm Albums Label of the Year ===
- IGA
- **Machete**
- UG
- Universal Latino
