= Cholo (subculture) =

Mexican-American subculture

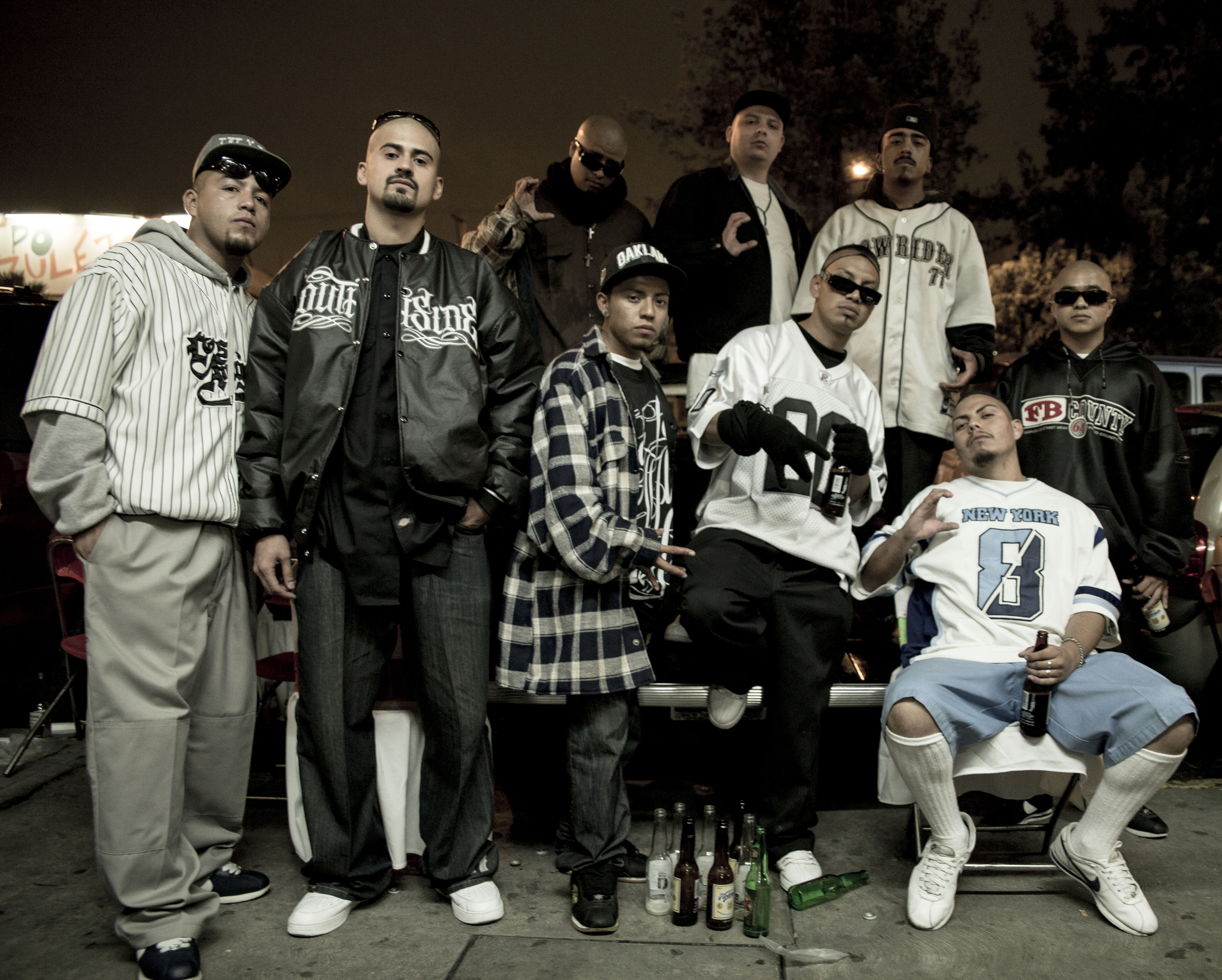
Cholo style, originating from Chicanos in the US, can be seen here as adopted by men from Cacos 13, a gang from Nezahualcóyotl.

A cholo or chola is a Chicano/a and subculture or life-style associated with a particular set of dress, behavior and philosophy which originated in Los Angeles. A veterano or veterana is an older member of the same subculture. Other terms referring to male members of the subculture may include vato and vato loco. Cholo was first reclaimed by Chicano youth in the 1960s and emerged as a popular identification in the late 1970s.

== Usage of terms ==
=== Historical ===
Cholo was originally used to denote a racialized individual of lower socioeconomic status. It first emerged in the early 17th century as a term used by Spanish colonizers. "The children of these they call cholos. Cholo is a word from the Windward Islands; it means dog, not of the purebred variety, but of very disreputable origin; and the Spaniards use it for insult and vituperation." In the latter part of the 19th century, it referred to "culturally marginal" mestizos of Native American origin, being applied to "peasant mestizos as a pejorative ethnic label to distinguish the rich, the upwardly mobile, and other aspiring members ... from the working class."

Clearly the origin is complex, Jose Cuellar writes in 1982:

Racial and cultural status, along with social class, are reflected in the term cholo itself, which was adopted in California in the 1960s by youth following the pachuco tradition, as a label for that identity (Cuellar 1982). In 1571, Fray Alonso de Molina, in his Nahuatl vocabulary (Vocabulario en Lengua Castellana y Mexicana Y Mexicana y Castellana), defined the word xolo as slave, servant, or waiter. The Porrúa Dictionary defines cholo, as used in the Americas, as a civilized Native American or a half-breed or mestizo of a European father and Native American mother. The word has historically been used along the borderland as a derogatory term to mean lower class Mexican migrants, and in the rest of Latin America to mean an acculturating Indian or peasant.

=== Pachucos ===
During the 1930s and 1940s, the Chicano look known as pachuco appeared and was associated with the zoot suit and hep cat subcultures. The press at the time accused the pachucos in the U.S. of gang membership, petty criminality, and a lack of patriotism during World War II leading to the Zoot Suit Riots. Continuing until the early 1970s, the typical Chicano hairstyle was a variant of the pompadour, piled high on the head and kept in place with pomade or brilliantine.

=== Reclamation ===
In the 1960s, the Chicano Movement turned the term cholo into a way to express Chicano pride and identity. Since then, it has been more widely reclaimed among Meso-Americans of mixed heritage.

== Prison culture ==
Prison in the Chicano gang culture has widely been accepted as a badge of honor for Latino gang members. Many who are deeply entrenched in street gangs such as Sureños, Norteños, or affiliated groups, prison serves as a central hub of power, gangster status, protection, and operational command rather than a deterrent. The influence of the Mexican Mafia along with the idolization of the senior members make prison time desirable specifically the high-security level 4 prisons yards.

== Style ==
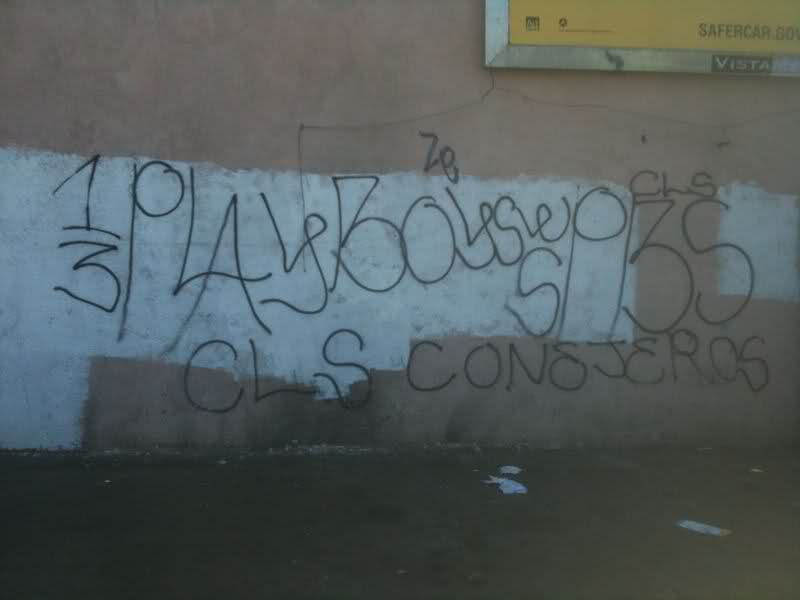
Cholo style graffiti in Los Angeles.

=== Cholo ===
Cholo style is often associated with wearing some combination of a tartan, flannel, or Pendleton shirt buttoned at the top over a white T-shirt or tanktop, a hair net over short hair combed straight back or a shaved head, a bandana tied around the head and pulled down just above the eyes, reverse baseball caps, dark sunglasses, loose-fitting khaki pants (chinos) or shorts, long chains, long socks, white tennis shoes, and stylized tattoos. The style has been described as both a necessity and a style of empowerment. Cholo style represents a large part of cholo subculture, although it does not represent it in its totality. Cholo style has been identified as combining the loose-fitting comfort of the traditional huipil and baggy draping of the zoot suit donned by the pachuco.

Adopting cholo style has also been identified as a way for youths to assert their Chicano identity, especially for those who are only English-speaking. James Diego Vigil analyzes how some barrios in the United States that were predominately Spanish-speaking in the 1960s became mostly English-speaking by the 1980s. Some use cholo style to deny their anglicization or cultural assimilation as well as to separate themselves from affiliating with Mexican migrants. As stated by Vigil, "much of this interethnic friction revolves around ... competition for scarce job resources, especially between members of the depressed underclass and desperate immigrants." However, it is also cultural, with "Mexicans making fun of a Chicano's inability to speak 'proper' Spanish and conversely" Chicanos and cholos sometimes using interethnic pejoratives against Mexican migrants, such as "chuntaro" and "wetback."

Cholo style graffiti is a unique writing and lettering style. The artist Chaz uses a calligraphic variant in his works. Retna's work is inspired by Cholo letters. This designation may also be associated with black ink tattoos, commonly involving calligraphy and art. A cholo might also stereotypically own a lowrider. Another staple of cholo fashion is long hair tied into braids as depicted by actor Danny Trejo.

The cholo/a subculture has spread to cities in the United States with large Chicano or Latino populations, including New York City. It has also been adopted as a subculture in Thailand as well as in Japan and has been introduced to Mexico (such as in Nogales, Sonora, and Mexico City) in a modified form as documented in the 2015 photo documentary book Cholumbianos by Amanda Watkins.

=== Chola ===
Chola style is often associated with wearing some combination of a long white T-shirt or tanktops, sometimes worn under plaid shirts, baggy jeans, flat black shoes, long hair, spiked bangs, dark or heavy eyeliner, and dark lipstick and lip liner. Chola style has been identified as exhibiting "a radically criminalized femininity, situating them in the purview of official and unofficial policing as well as legal and extralegal sanctions." Chola style is perceived with less menace than cholo style, although it has been described as more directly challenging to the gendered expectations placed on women.

== Criminalization ==
Chicano/a youth who adopt a cholo or chola culture endure criminalization, with police and other institutions equating cholo style with a 'gang member'. While older residents in barrios initially embraced cholas and cholos as "a larger subculture not necessarily associated with crime and violence (but rather with a youthful temporary identity), law enforcement agents, ignorant or disdainful of barrio life, labeled youth who wore clean white tennis shoes, shaved their heads, or long socks, as deviant."

Gilberto Rosas describes the fashion of cholos as a style which has become criminalized: "a radically conditioned choice to be visibly and self-consciously identified with a criminalized class". Because the way cholo style has been criminalized, it commonly excludes cholos from employment opportunities while opening them up to routine police harassment and arrest.

In a study of cholos in a Southern California community renamed "Riverland" (to protect the confidentiality of the participants), Victor Rios and Patrick Lopez-Aguado discuss how cholos are marked as "human targets" and come to understand their own perceived criminality. Rios and Lopez-Aguado identify that cholos experience routine harassment and arrest by police. As stated by Rios and Lopez-Aguado, cholos remain "steadfast in their stylistic stance because their visible opposition appeared to be the entire point", as it is "intentionally oppositional to the mainstream". Cholos are aware that their style will not grant them social mobility and often maintain their style after having been rejected by multiple institutions, including "family, schools, police, and the labor market". Rios and Lopez-Aguado explain:

Nonetheless, the feeling of dignity and affirmation often outweighed the punitive consequences meted out by the state ... Conscious of the few opportunities to find legitimate career paths, Latino youth adopted appearances they knew would block them from the low-level service positions they were expected to fill. They tapped into racist fears of their inherent criminality to create a public impression that would counter the image of the submissive, stigmatized servant. In a racialized, hyperexploited service economy, these youths deliberately put themselves out of service to retain their dignity.

== Media ==
=== Film ===
- There is a reference to "The Cholo" in Assault on Precinct 13 (1976), although it is used to refer specifically to a blood oath instead of a Mexican person.
- Boulevard Nights is a 1979 American neo noir crime film directed by Michael Pressman. It is about life in East Los Angeles and its street gangs.
- Born in East L.A. is a 1987 American comedy film written and directed by Cheech Marin, which makes several references to Cholos, their style of dress, and speaking.
- Stand and Deliver is a 1988 American drama film based on the true story of a high school mathematics teacher in LA.
- Blood In Blood Out is a 1993 American epic crime drama film about Cholo prison life directed by Taylor Hackford.
- Mi Vida Loca is a 1993 American drama film directed and written by Allison Anders, about Cholas growing up in the Echo Park section of Los Angeles.
- The 1993 action film Falling Down features a Cholo gang as minor antagonists in the first act, who harass Bill Foster (Michael Douglas) and later execute an unsuccessful drive-by shooting against him.
- The biographical film Selena (1997) features a scene where two Cholos recognize Selena (Jennifer Lopez) and offer to help her after her tour bus got stuck on the side of a highway.
- The film Next Friday (2000) features three Cholo brothers who serve as antagonists to the main characters.
- In the film Napoleon Dynamite (2004), Nano and Arturo De Silva play characters simply referred to as "Cholo No. 1" and "Cholo No. 2".
- In the film Knocked Up (2007), Ben (Seth Rogen) and Pete (Paul Rudd) have a back and forth joke where Pete says that Ben '...got dressed up like a Cholo on Easter to come to this party."
- In Logan (2017), the titular character begins the film defending his limo from individuals to whom Donald Pierce derogatorily refers as "Cholos," who are trying to strip the car's rims.

=== Games ===
- In the video game Grand Theft Auto: Vice City Stories (2006), there is a street gang called the Cholos who resemble the stereotypical gangster image of a Cholo.
- In the video game Grand Theft Auto: San Andreas (2004), there are two gangs called the Aztecas and Vagos. One of the supporting characters, Cesar Vialpando, is a member of the Aztecas and serves as a friend to the main character Carl "CJ" Johnson.
- In the video game Grand Theft Auto V (2013), several Latino street gangs are depicted, including the Vagos, Aztecas, and the Marabunta Grande.

=== Literature ===
- The Adventures of Chico Loco, a comic strip created by David Gonzalez popular in the late 1990s and early 2000s led to the production of toys known as "Homies," which have become collectibles across the world and have inspired numerous imitations. The Los Angeles Police Department stated that the toys promoted "gang life."

=== Music ===
- LA punk rock band The Dickies recorded "I'm a Chollo" for their album Dawn of the Dickies (1979).
- Prayers coined the term cholo goth to describe their electronic rock sound.
- Hip-Hop artists Delinquent Habits and Control Machete have been described as representing the Cholo subculture.
- Cholo gained even further notoriety in 2007 in the United States with the song "Lean Like a Cholo" by Down AKA Kilo.
- Chola style has been adopted by Christina Aguilera, Gwen Stefani ("Luxurious" and "Hollaback Girl"), Cher, Madonna, Missy Elliott, Selena Gomez, FKA Twigs, and Rihanna.
- Fergie's music videos "London Bridge" and "Glamorous" feature backup dancers dressed as Cholas.
- Alejandro Aranda performed an original song called "Cholo Love" during his run on American Idol.

=== Television ===
- In Mayans M.C., the motorcycles owned by EZ and Angel Reyes are referred to as "cholos chops" by two members of a hostile club.
- The show This Fool takes a comedic look on Cholo life experiences, culture and life-style.

== See also ==
- Eshays – A similar Australian subculture
- Pizza effect
