= Atlas (graffiti artist) =

American designer

Rick Ordonez
- Known for: Graffiti art, "kitty cat tagger"
- Style: Stylized cat characters

Rick Ordonez, also known as Atlas and known colloquially as the "kitty cat tagger," is an American graphic designer and graffiti artist from Alhambra, California.

In early 2010, Atlas transitioned from creating large ornate graphics to drawing stylized cat characters, particularly on or near Pasadena Freeway. In April, Andy "Midzt" Rios was wrongly arrested for tagging the cats. On June 30, Atlas was arrested without incident at his home. He was charged with allegedly causing $15,000 in damages and faced up to 90 days in jail and 300 hours of community service. Ordonez was described as a “cat-lover" who kept cats as pets. In an article for LA Weekly, he was described as "a nerdy guy who draws cats." When asked why he drew cats, he simply replied "I love cats."

Later that year, Atlas got his own show entitled "Rick Ordonez: Kitty Litter" at Mid-City Arts in November 2010. Gallery manager Medvin “Med” Sobio stated "I saw them and thought it was something completely different. Everybody’s out there doing big, bad graffiti things [to show that] 'I’m a big, bad guy,’ and here he is, doing cats." Ordonez remained anonymous for the show.

Atlas was part of the ESMoA art laboratory SCRATCH show in 2014.

== See also ==
- Man One
- Chaz Bojórquez
