= Man One =

Mural and graffiti artist

Man One (born Alejandro Poli Jr., 1971, in East Los Angeles) is a Los Angeles-based Mexican-American mural and graffiti artist best known for popularizing West Coast graffiti to an international audience and defining graffiti as a serious contemporary art form. Man One "never saw painting murals or doing graffiti as a ‘ghetto’ influence," but rather as a progression of contemporary art.

== Childhood and education ==
Man One is a first-generation American whose parents immigrated from Mexico to LA in the late 1960s. He began doing graffiti as a child in the 1980s, eventually graduating from Loyola Marymount University with a degree in art.

He cites influences ranging from Los Tres Grandes -- (Orozco, Rivera, and Siqueiros)-- to Dali, Duchamp, and Picasso, as well as earlier Los Angeles muralists like Willie Heron and Chaz Bojorquez.

== Career ==
Man One has created murals and large scales pieces and shown his artwork across the United States and worldwide, including Germany, Japan, Mexico, and Northern Ireland. In 2002, during the Los Angeles mural moratorium he founded Crewest Gallery which provided artists a legitimate space wherein to display their work. Crewest Gallery closed in 2014.

In 2006, Man One was commissioned to do a piece for the Los Angeles County Metropolitan Transportation Authority (MTA) on construction fences alongside an extension project.

Man One received a United States State Department Speaker and Specialist Grant to work with children in Panama building self-esteem through art. He was instrumental in lifting the Los Angeles mural moratorium, clearing the way for murals to become a permanent part of Los Angeles art and culture. He encourages others, saying, "Turn on some music, shake my spray cans and get lost in my own creative experience. That’s my favorite recipe. Peace is always right there, underneath our noses.

Man One has worked on large scale projects for commercial clients as well as painting live pieces at music events alongside the Wu-Tang Clan, P-funk, Blink 182 and the Black Eyed Peas.

Man One created #FacesLA, a series of portraits on building walls in Los Angeles featuring "the images of normal Angelenos." He has worked with the Los Angeles the Department of Cultural Affairs to get permits for these murals so they would permanent art fixtures.

In 2017, Man One illustrated the book, “Chef Roy Choi and the Street Food Remix (Readers to Eaters)” a children’s book about Los Angeles food innovator Roy Choi.

In 2022, he was selected to install a mural under a freeway overpass of the SR-57 for the city of Placentia entitled "The Good People Under Our Sun and Moon."

== See also ==
- Atlas
- Chaz Bojórquez
