= No Me Digas Que No (Xtreme song) =

Single by Xtreme featuring Adrienne Bailon

from the album Haciendo Historia
- Released: 2007
- Recorded: 2007
- Genre: Bachata
- Length: 3:38
- Label: La Calle Records; Univision Music Group
- Songwriters: Steven Tejada; Michael Figueroa

Xtreme singles chronology
"Hiliana" (2007)	"No Me Digas Que No" (2007)	"Through That Window (Enamorado Estoy)" (2008)

"No Me Digas Que No" (English: "Don't Say No To Me") is a song by American duo Xtreme with American singer Adrienne Bailon. It served as a single for the 2007 Platinum Edition of their second album, Haciendo Historia (2006).

== Charts ==
=== Weekly charts ===
Chart (2007–2008)	Peak Position
US Hot Latin Songs (Billboard)	26
US Latin Rhythm Airplay (Billboard)	3
US Tropical Airplay (Billboard)	24

=== Year-end charts ===
Chart (2008)	Position
US Latin Rhythm Airplay (Billboard)	16
