= Chapter Dos =

Studio album by Xtreme
- Released: November 24, 2008
- Genre: Bachata
- Length: 39:13
- Label: Machete Music

Xtreme chronology
Haciendo Historia (2006)	Chapter Dos (2008)	Chapter Dos: On the Verge (2009)

Singles from Chapter Dos
- 1. "Through That Window (Enamorado Estoy)" Released: 2008; 2. "Lloro y Lloro" Released: 2008; 3. "Su Ultimo Error" Released: 2008

Chapter Dos is the third album from Bachata group, Xtreme. It was released November 24, 2008. The single, "Through That Window (Enamorado Estoy)" peaked 27 on Billboard's Hot Latin Songs chart.

== Track listing ==
No.	Title	Length
1.	"La Esquina De Don Andres (Paris Azul)"	2:54
2.	"Lloro y Lloro"	3:07
3.	"Through That Window (Enamorado Estoy)"	2:41
4.	"Quiero"	3:20
5.	"Su Ultimo Error"	3:26
6.	"Por Que Será"	3:19
7.	"Esta Emergencia"	4:02
8.	"Quisiera Ser"	3:06
9.	"Soundcheck" (Skit)	1:05
10.	"Super Fanática"	3:29
11.	"Te Recuerdas"	3:18
12.	"La Función"	2:38
13.	"La Pesadilla"	4:08
Total length:		39:13

Bonus Track (Not available in the U.S.)
No.	Title	Length
14.	"Estampa"	2:47
Total length:		42:00

=== On The Verge ===
On November 17, 2009, Chapter Dos: On the Verge was released. This was either their fourth studio album, their first compilation album, or a re-edition of Chapter Dos based on the name. The words "On The Verge" are from their 2009 reality show from Mun2.

== Charts ==
=== Weekly charts ===
Chart (2006–07)	Peak Position
US Heatseekers Albums (Billboard)	7
US Top Latin Albums (Billboard)	16
US Tropical Albums (Billboard)	1

=== Year-end charts ===
Chart (2009)	Position
US Tropical Albums (Billboard)	5

== See also ==
- List of number-one Billboard Tropical Albums from the 2000s
