= ¿Adónde Se Fue? =

Single by Xtreme

from the album Haciendo Historia
- Released: 2007
- Recorded: 2006
- Genre: Bachata
- Length: 3:05
- Label: La Calle Records; Univision Music Group
- Songwriter(s): Steven Tejada; Michael Figueroa

Xtreme singles chronology
| "Shorty, Shorty" (2006) | "¿Adónde Se Fue?" (2007) | "Hiliana" (2007) |

Music video
- "¿Adónde Se Fue?" on YouTube

"¿Adónde Se Fue?", or simply "Adónde Se Fue" (English: "Where Did It Go") is a song by American duo Xtreme. It served as the second single for their second album, Haciendo Historia (2006). An R&B Version, which is listed as an R&B/Pop Version, is also featured in the album. A Pop Version was included in the Platinum Edition of the album replacing the R&B Version.

== Track listing ==
- CD single
1. "¿Adónde Se Fue?" (Bachata Version) - 3:05
2. "¿Adónde Se Fue?" (Pop Version)" - 3:07

== Charts ==
| Chart (2007) | Peak position |
|---|---|
| US Latin Rhythm Airplay (Billboard) | 17 |
| US Tropical Airplay (Billboard) | 24 |
