= La Introducción =

La Introduccion

Studio album by Carlos & Alejandra
- Released: April 21, 2009; 2010 (La Introducción... Continued)
- Genre: Bachata
- Length: 46:30
- Label: Machete Music & Universal Music Latin Entertainment

Singles from La Introduccion
- 1. "Cuanto Duele" Released: March 10, 2009; 2. "Perdóname" Released: 2009; 3. "Cafecito" Released: 2009

La Introducción (The Introduction) is the debut album of Bachata duo Carlos & Alejandra. It was released in 2009 by Machete Music and Universal Music Latin Entertainment. The album was nominated for Tropical Album of the Year at the Premios Lo Nuestro 2010 Awards. In 2010 the duo released an extended edition titled La Introducción...Continued. This version featured 3 additional songs.

== Singles ==
The album was supported by the singles Cafecito, Perdóname, and Cuanto Duele which peaked at number 6 on the Billboard Tropical Airplay chart.

== Track listing ==
No.	Title	Length
1.	"Explícame"	3:39
2.	"Arrepentimiento"	3:49
3.	"El Amor No Tiene Edad"	4:09
4.	"Cafecito"	3:32
5.	"Quizás (Bachata Version)"	4:04
6.	"Falso Sueño"	4:07
7.	"Cuánto Duele"	3:31
8.	"Ella & Él"	4:01
9.	"Esta Canción"	3:52
10.	"Perdóname"	3:20
11.	"Amor a Vista"	3:55
12.	"Quizás (R&B Version)"	3:34
Total length:		46:30

La Introducción...Continued
No.	Title	Length
13.	"El Pintor"	3:52
14.	"La Llamada"	3:36
15.	"Vendi Todo a.k.a Muestra De Amor"	3:29
Total length:		57:16

Music Videos
No.	Title	Length
1.	"Cuánto Duele"	3:44
2.	"Perdóname"	3:35
Total length:		7:19

== Personnel ==
- Guiro - Albert Batista
- Mixing - Alfredo Matheus Diez
- Audio Engineer, Bass Instrument, Keyboards - Antonio Rodriguez
- Composer - Carlos "Tapado" Vargas
- Primary Artist - Carlos y Alejandra
- Guitar - Clayton Steininger
- Guiro - Daniel Luna
- Guitar - Dennis Vargas
- Guitar - Eunel Torres
- Audio Engineer, Guitar - Gerson Corniel
- Guitar - Hector Villa
- Guitar - Ito Santos
- Composer - Jorge Luís Piloto
- Bongos, Conga Drum - Jose Perdomo
- Conga Drum - Orlando Batista
- Guitar - Pablo Rosario
- Bongos - Raúl Bier
- Composer - Roberto Feliz
- Composer - Yoel Henríquez

== Charts ==
Chart (2009)	Peak Position
US Tropical Albums (Billboard)	4
