= Baby, Baby (Xtreme song) =

Single by Xtreme

from the album Chapter Dos: On the Verge
- Released: September 29, 2009
- Recorded: 2009
- Genre: Bachata
- Length: 2:57
- Label: Machete Music & Universal Music Latin Entertainment
- Songwriter(s): Danny D (Danny Alfredo Mejía), Steve Styles (Steven Tejada), Felix Nunez

Xtreme singles chronology
"Vuelve" (2009)	"Baby, Baby" (2009)	"Devuélveme La Navidad" (2009)

Music video
- "Baby, Baby" on YouTube

"Baby, Baby" is a song by American duo Xtreme. It served as the second single for their fourth album, Chapter Dos: On the Verge (2009).

== Charts ==
Chart (2009)	Peak Position
US Tropical Airplay (Billboard)	34
