= Devuélveme La Navidad =

Single by Xtreme featuring Carlos & Alejandra

from the album Chapter Dos: On the Verge
- Released: November 3, 2009
- Recorded: 2009
- Genre: Bachata
- Length: 3:25
- Label: Machete Music & Universal Music Latin Entertainment

Xtreme singles chronology
"Baby, Baby" (2009)	"Devuélveme La Navidad" (2009)	"Y Vas A Llorar" (2010)

Music video
- "Devuélveme La Navidad" on YouTube

"Devuélveme La Navidad" (Give Me Christmas Back) is a song by Bachata duo Xtreme featuring Carlos & Alejandra, who are also a Bachata duo. It served as the third single for their fourth album, Chapter Dos: On the Verge (2009).

== Charts ==
Chart (2009)	Peak Position
US Tropical Airplay (Billboard)	37
