= Shorty, Shorty =

Single by Xtreme

from the album Haciendo Historia
- Released: 2006
- Genre: Bachata
- Length: 2:54
- Label: La Calle Records; Univision Music Group
- Songwriter(s): Steven Tejada

Xtreme singles chronology
"Honey I Do" (2005)	"Shorty, Shorty" (2006)	"¿Adónde Se Fue?" (2007)

Audio sample
- An 18 second sample of the R&B-infused Bachata song "Shorty, Shorty" sung by Xtreme in Spanglish.: file; help

Music video
- "Shorty, Shorty" on YouTube

"Shorty, Shorty" is a song by American duo Xtreme. It served as the first single for their second album, Haciendo Historia (2006). It is considered their most successful song to this day. It peaked at number two on the Billboard Hot Latin Songs chart. It also peaked at number one on the Billboard Tropical Airplay chart. They also recorded a fully Spanish Pop version and a remix version which were added as bonus tracks for the second album. The pop version was also added to the Platinum Edition of the album that was released in 2007 along with an English version of the song.

== Track listings and digital download formats ==
- Single
1. "Shorty, Shorty" – 2:54
- Remixes
1. "Shorty, Shorty" – 2:54
2. "Shorty, Shorty" (Remix HSP) – 2:58
3. "Shorty, Shorty" (Pop Version)" – 2:59
4. "Te Extraño"
- Mixes
1. "Shorty Shorty" (The Friscia / Lamboy Spanglish Club Mix) – 10:15
2. "Shorty Shorty" (The Friscia / Lamboy Extreme Dub) – 10:03
3. "Shorty Shorty" (Cotto's Reggaeton Spanglish Mix) – 3:24

== Charts ==
=== Weekly charts ===
Chart (2006–2007)	Peak Position
US Hot Latin Songs (Billboard)	2
US Latin Pop Airplay (Billboard)	28
US Latin Rhythm Airplay (Billboard)	3
US Tropical Airplay (Billboard)	1

=== Year-end charts ===
Chart (2007)	Position
US Hot Latin Songs (Billboard)	11
US Latin Rhythm Airplay (Billboard)	8
US Tropical Airplay (Billboard)	12

== See also ==
- List of Billboard Tropical Airplay number ones of 2007
