= Lloro y Lloro =

Single by Xtreme

from the album Chapter Dos
- Released: 2008
- Recorded: 2008
- Genre: Bachata
- Length: 3:07
- Label: Machete Music
- Songwriter: Steve Styles (Steven Tejada)

Xtreme singles chronology
"Through That Window (Enamorado Estoy)" (2008)	"Lloro y Lloro" (2008)	"Vuelve" (2009)

Music video
- "Lloro y Lloro" on YouTube

"Lloro y Lloro" (I Cry and I Cry) is a song by American duo Xtreme. It served as the second single for their third album, Chapter Dos (2008).

== Charts ==
Chart (2008)	Peak Position
US Latin Rhythm Airplay (Billboard)	30
