= Xtreme (album) =

Studio album by Xtreme
- Released: June 28, 2005; April 18, 2006 (Re-issue)
- Genre: Bachata
- Length: 40:15
- Labels: 2 Strong Music; SGZ International; Univision Music Group (Re-issue)

Xtreme chronology
We Got Next (2003)	Xtreme (2005)	Haciendo Historia (2006)

Singles from Xtreme
- 1. "Te Extraño" Released: 2005; 2. "Honey, I Do" Released: 2005

Xtreme is the bachata group Xtreme's first album under a recognized label, SGZ Entertainment. The album contains the singles, "Te Extraño" and "Honey I Do". The album was later re-issued under the Univision Music Group label after their acquisition of SGZ International. Only Steve Styles and Danny D were on the cover of the re-issued edition because Elvis Rosario had left the group.

== Track listing ==
No.	Title	Length
1.	"Te Extraño" (Bachata Version)	3:32
2.	"Ahora Vete"	3:47
3.	"Me Cambiaste La Vida" (featuring Tito Nieves)	3:19
4.	"Honey, I Do"	4:03
5.	"Mi Niña"	3:57
6.	"Ese Fui Yo"	2:56
7.	"Pardon Me"	3:53
8.	"Caricias"	3:43
9.	"Amor Destrozado"	3:22
10.	"Ya No Aguanto Mas"	3:25
11.	"Te Extraño" (R&B Version)	4:19
Total length:		40:15

== Charts ==
Chart (2005)	Peak Position
US Tropical Albums (Billboard)	14
