= Through That Window (Enamorado Estoy) =

Single by Xtreme

from the album Chapter Dos
- Released: October 7, 2008
- Recorded: 2008
- Genre: Bachata
- Length: 2:41
- Label: Machete Music
- Songwriter(s): Danny D (Danny Alfredo Mejía), Felix Nunez

Xtreme singles chronology
"No Me Digas Que No" (2007)	"Through That Window (Enamorado Estoy)" (2008)	"Lloro y Lloro" (2008)

Music video
- "Through That Window (Enamorado Estoy)" on YouTube

"Through That Window (Enamorado Estoy)",(English: "Through That Window (I'm In Love)") is a song by American duo Xtreme. It served as the first single for their third album, Chapter Dos (2008).

== Charts ==
Chart (2008)	Peak position
US Hot Latin Songs (Billboard)	27
US Latin Rhythm Airplay (Billboard)	8
US Tropical Airplay (Billboard)	5
