= Alfredo Zegarra Tejada =

Peruvian politician

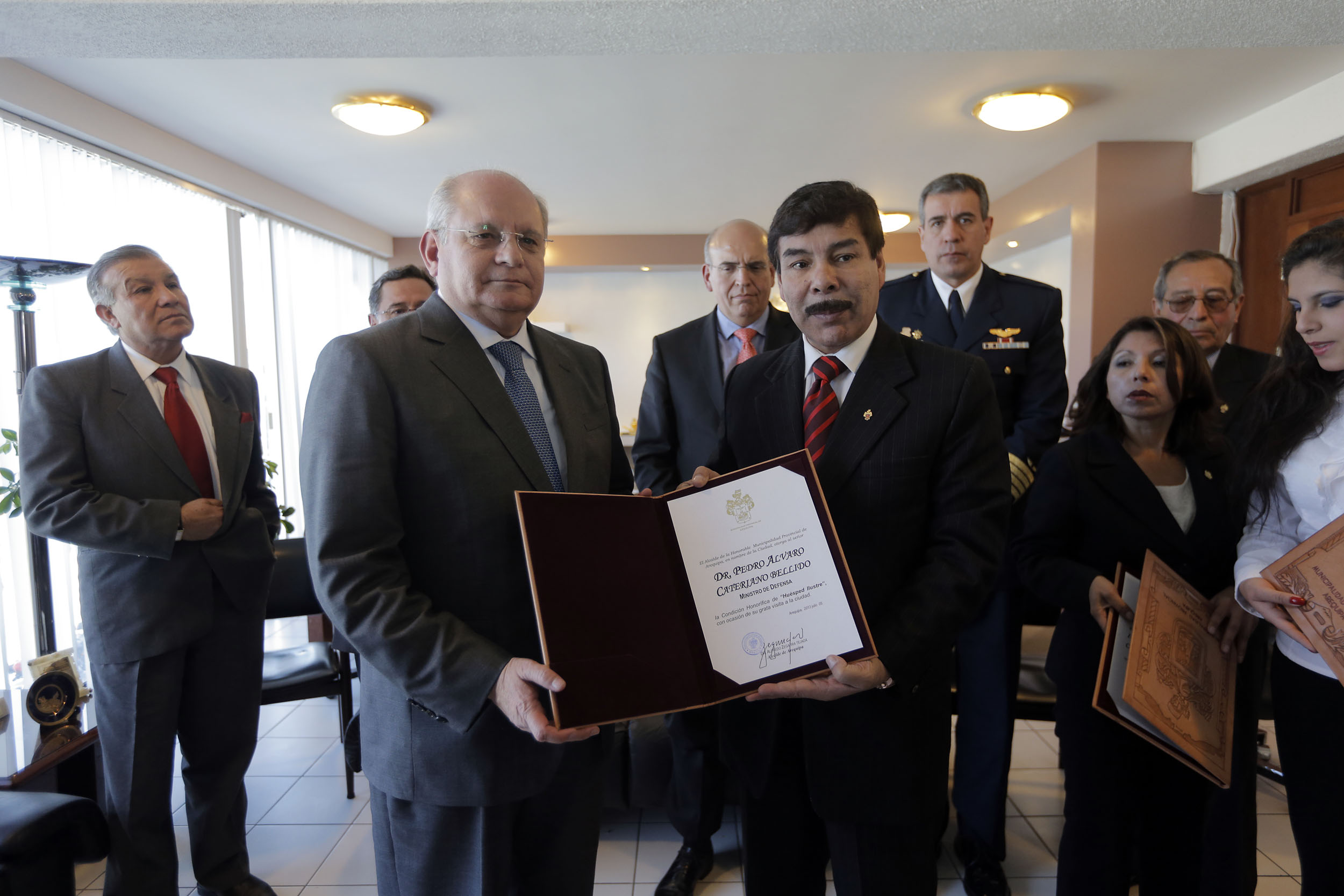
VISITA A LA CIUDAD DE AREQUIPA (9218960792)

Alfredo Zegarra Tejada Florentino (born October 16, 1951) is a Peruvian politician and the former mayor of Arequipa. He was elected as mayor in 2011. From 2003 to 2010, he was mayor of José Luis Bustamante District. He studied at the National University of Saint Augustine, and is married to Nelly Molina. Before entering politics, he was a physician.
