= Lean like a Cholo =

2007 single by Down AKA Kilo

"Lean Like a Cholo"

Single by Down AKA Kilo

from the album Definition of an Ese
- Released: April 10, 2007
- Recorded: 2007
- Genre: Chicano rap
- Length: 3:18
- Label: Silent Music
- Songwriter(s): J. Martinez/J. Starry
- Producer(s): Fingazz

Down AKA Kilo singles chronology
"Cali Cowboyz" (2007)	"Lean Like a Cholo" (2007)	"Definition of an Ese" (2007)

"Lean Like a Cholo" is the first single released by American rapper Down AKA Kilo from his album Definition of an Ese. It debuted on the U.S. Billboard Hot 100 at #93 in May 2007 and has peaked at #34. "Cholo" is a term used in Mexico and the southwestern United States. In modern Mexico and the U.S., "cholo" is a term implying a gangster or gang member. The big body guard from Jose Luis Sin Censura makes a guest appearance.

== Remixes ==
- The song "Tatted like a Cholo" by Tyga uses the same instrumental track.
- Parodies of the song include;" "Lean Like a Chola" by Carmen; the track "Eat like a Gordo," by Tattoo, a Los Angeles-based DJ from the hip-hop station Power 106 FM, has played on several Southern California radio stations and can be found around the Internet.
