= Down AKA Kilo =

American rapper

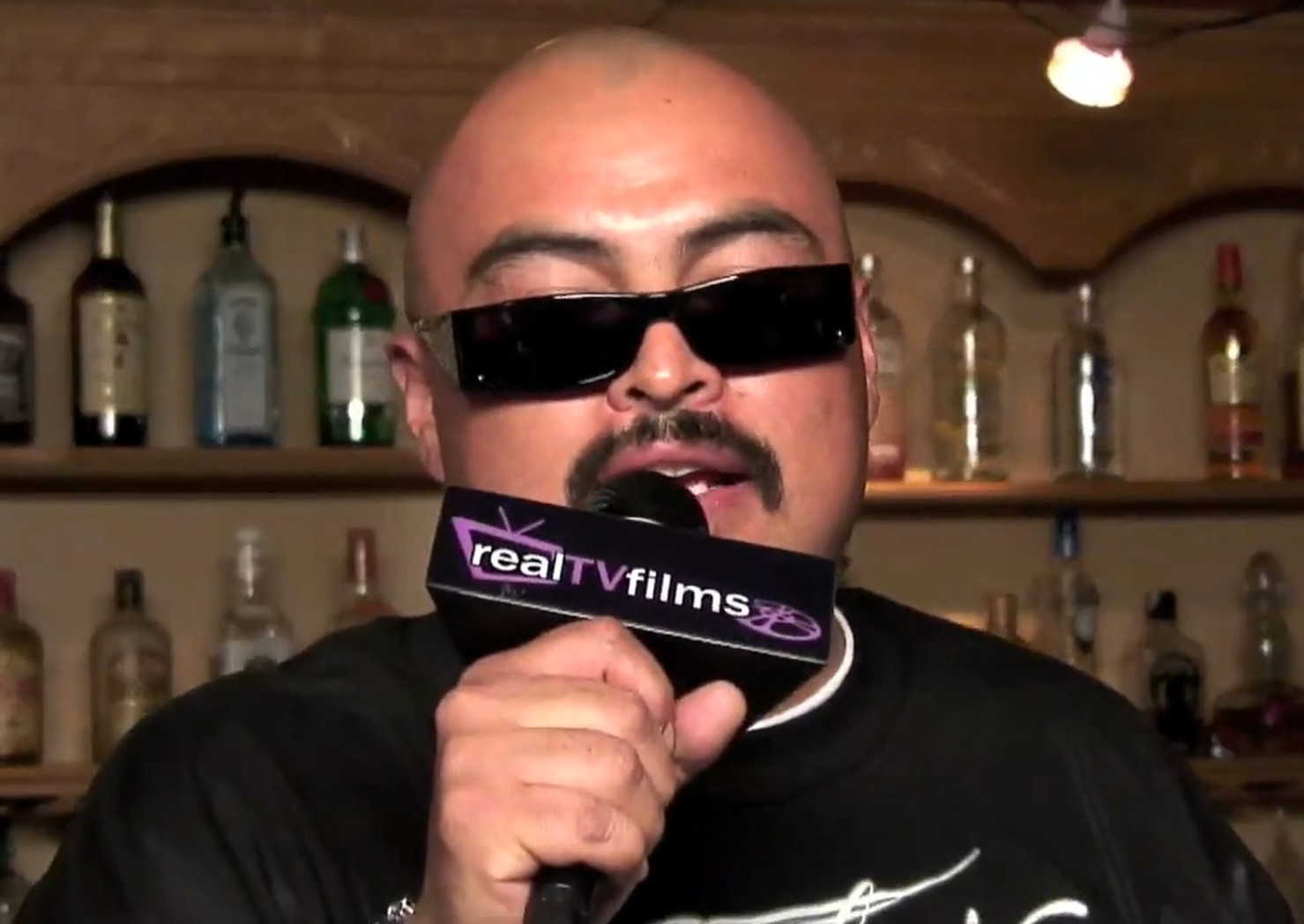
- Down AKA Kilo in 2009

Background information
- Born: Juan Jose Martinez; 1985 (age 40–41); Oxnard, California, U.S.
- Genres: Hip hop
- Occupation: Rapper
- Years active: 1998-present
- Labels: Familia Records, Silent Giant, Machete, Universal
- Website: www.myspace.com/downakakilo

Juan Jose Martinez (born 1985), better known by his stage name Down AKA Kilo, is an American rapper from Oxnard, California.

Martinez was born in Oxnard; his parents were undocumented immigrants from Mexico. Growing up, he listened to Cypress Hill and N.W.A and began rapping at age 13. He made his first recordings at the garage of childhood friend Edward "E-Dub" Rios, who would later become producer of the Power 106 radio show Pocos Pero Locos. He released his debut album California Cowboyz in 2003, and his second album Definition of an Ese in 2007, with two singles from the album, "Lean like a Cholo" and "Definition of an Ese."

On March 28, 2009, Down was injured in a car crash at Farmington, New Mexico and put in a coma while hospitalized.

== Discography ==
=== Albums ===
Year	Title	Peak chart position	
Year	Title	US R&B	US Heatseekers
2003	California Cowboyz: Released: July 8, 2003; Label: Down By Law (#1300), Silent Giant (#8006); Format: CD, digital download	—	—
2007	Definition of an Ese: Released: April 10, 2007; Label: Silent Giant (# 880110); Format: CD/DVD, digital download	70	11

=== Singles ===
Year	Title	Peak chart position		Album
Year	Title	US	US Rap	Album
2007	"Lean like a Cholo"	34	15	Definition of an Ese
