= Charles Bojórquez =

American painter

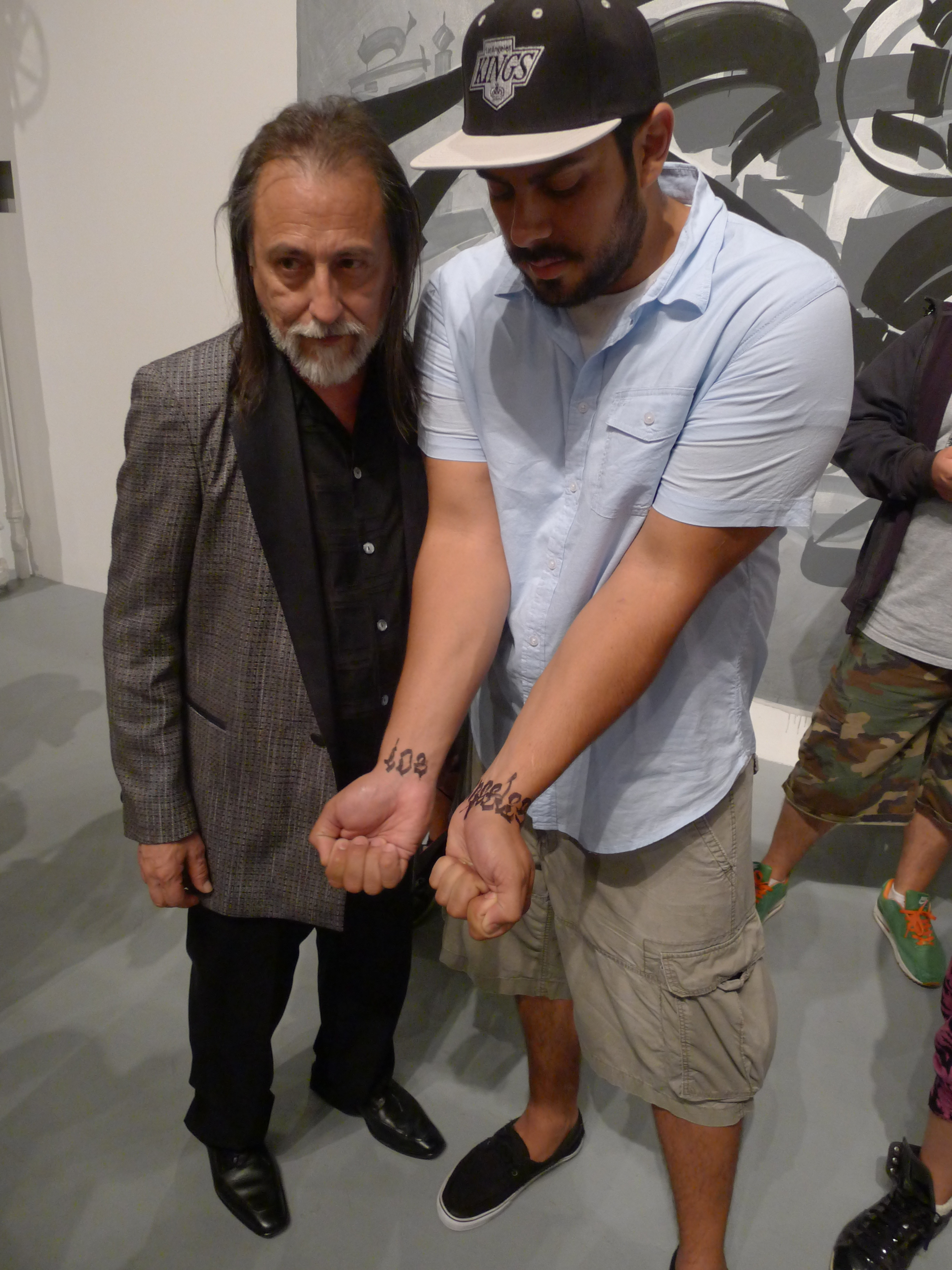
- Bojórquez (left) in 2011
- Born: 1949 (age 76–77); Highland Park, Los Angeles
- Education: Chouinard Art Institute, California State University Los Angeles, Pacific Asia Art Museum, Universidad de Arts Plásticas
- Notable work: Señor Suerte (1969), Placa/Rollcall (1980), Somos La Luz (1992)
- Style: Graffiti art

Charles "Chaz" Bojórquez is a Mexican-American Chicano graffiti artist and painter from Los Angeles who is known for his work in Cholo-style calligraphy. He is credited with bringing the Chicano and Cholo graffiti style into the established art scene.

== Personal life ==
Charles Bojórquez was born in Highland Park, Los Angeles in 1949. He began his art career with street art, tagging in his hometown neighborhood in the early 1970s.

Bojórquez received formal art training at the Chouinard Art Institute in Los Angeles (1968-1970) for ceramics and painting, California State University Los Angeles (1967-1968) for painting, the Pacific Asia Art Museum (1966-1968) for calligraphy, and at Universidad de Artes Plásticas in Guadalajara for Pre-Columbian art, sculpture, and ceramics.

At Chouinard Art Institute, he learned the fundamentals of art from the school’s founder, Mrs. Nelbert Chouinard, who was a disciplinarian for art fundamentals for art education at the school. She wanted him and other students to draw and paint for at least six hours a day and was taught that drawing was the fundamental toolbox for all artists in all disciplines. For the first two years, he would draw the human figure everyday, bones, muscles, posture and he would take those exercises and the knowledge of drawing into other classes that dealt with sculpture, fashion, abstract painting and ceramics. He applied his training when he started graffiti, to paint with his presence and attitude. He says he paints his letters to reflect his pride in his culture and graffiti style. He paints them clean, straight and with power. He states that throughout his life, he had always followed the rule of "drawing is the foundation of art."

Bojórquez began his professional career with a successful run in commercial art and graphic design, working for advertising agencies Jack Wodell Associates and Tony Seiniger and Associates, where he learned the techniques of typography.

In January 1979, Bojórquez set off on a global tour, studying communication and writing systems around the world. Bojórquez collected newspapers and other forms of typography, and studied the calligraphy of glyphs, engraved scripts, and tattoos. After Bojórquez concluded his journey and returned to Los Angeles in May 1980, he began to produce graffiti with a greater focus on typeface and calligraphy, and explored the use of canvas as a medium. His time abroad also influenced his positions on social issues, inspiring in his exploration into activism.

== Identity ==
Bojórquez states that he experienced some resistance from his family for identifying as Chicano and also identifying the type of art he did as graffiti art. He expressed that he did not fully realize he was Chicano until he was forty years old and that it was a process of self-acceptance.

== Works ==
Cholo-style graffiti is described as "one of the oldest forms of graffiti," which was "invented by Mexican Americans in the 1940s, when gangs marked their territories with roll-calls, or lists of names." Bojórquez and other Chicano artists were developing their own style of graffiti art known as West Coast Cholo, which was influenced by Mexican muralism and pachuco placas (tags which indicate territorial boundaries).

=== Señor Suerte ===
Translated to “Mr. Lucky,” Señor Suerte is widely recognized as “LA's first stenciled graffito.” The tag depicts a human skull adorned with a scarf and a wide brimmed hat, crossing his fingers in reference to his name. The first spray-painted stencil reproduction of Señor Suerte appeared in 1969, located on a stairway pillar at the Arroyo Seco Parkway until it was painted over in 1984, over 15 years since its creation.

The image of Señor Suerte went on to become a well known gang symbol, often associated with the Los Angeles County Avenues gang. Having spread throughout the Los Angeles prison system, the depiction of Señor Suerte as a tattoo was thought to protect the owner from gunshot wounds and other injuries.

Bojórquez eventually made the transition to stenciling Señor Suerte on canvas, presenting the work for the first time as a painting in 1975 at the Los Angeles Municipal Art Gallery. The work sold for $50,000 USD and was presented at the exhibition “'Los Angelenos/Chicano Painters of L.A.' Selections from the Cheech Marin Collection” at the Los Angeles County Museum of Art in 2008.

=== Placa/Rollcall ===
In his 1980 work Placa/Rollcall, Bojórquez fills the canvas to its bounds with a sequential list of names of some the significant figures in his life, playing with his signature cholo-calligraphic aesthetic. He pulls inspiration from the street tradition of placas, a symbol or word that demonstrates unwavering loyalty to a group or gang that can be reproduced on the street or skin. By listing the names of these individuals in this manner, with figures including Bojórquez's former girlfriend and other close friends, he is calling back to the gang tradition of using placas to mark territory, display loyalty, and act as a representation of a greater community.

Collaborations

In recent years, Bojórquez has been invited to collaborate with major international brands such as Nike, Converse, and Levi's to design shoes, clothing, skateboard decks, and more.
