= Haciendo Historia =

Studio album by Xtreme
- Released: November 21, 2006; November 20, 2007 (Platinum Edition)
- Genre: Bachata
- Length: 53:45
- Labels: La Calle Records & Univision Music Group

Xtreme chronology
Xtreme (2005)	Haciendo Historia (2006)	Chapter Dos (2008)

Singles from Haciendo Historia
- 1. "Shorty, Shorty" Released: 2006; 2. "¿Adónde Se Fue?" Released: 2007; 3. "Hiliana" Released: 2007

Singles from Haciendo Historia (Platinum Edition)
- 1. "No Me Digas Que No" Released: 2007; 2. "Poderte Amar Así a.k.a Deseos Por Mí" Released: 2008

Haciendo Historia (Making History) is Xtreme's second album. The album contains the singles "Shorty, Shorty" and "¿Adónde Se Fue?". The album has sold 18,000 copies as of February 2007. On November 20, 2007, the Platinum Edition was released with an additional four tracks. There were two different versions of the smash hit "Shorty Shorty", a fully English version and a fully Spanish version which was just referenced as a Pop version. The other two tracks were new songs in which one of them featured Adrienne Bailon. It was a two disc album. The first disc was a CD and the second one a DVD.

== Track listing ==
Standard Edition
No.	Title	Length
1.	"Game 7" (Intro)	2:05
2.	"Shorty, Shorty"	2:54
3.	"Hiliana"	2:57
4.	"¿Adónde Se Fue?"	3:05
5.	"Her Broken Heart"	3:15
6.	"Es Amor"	3:06
7.	"I'm Sorry" (Interdule)	1:19
8.	"Discúlpame"	2:55
9.	"The Way I Feel"	3:46
10.	"Te Vas De Aquí"	3:10
11.	"Mientes"	3:40
12.	"¿Adónde Se Fue?" (R&B/Pop Version)	3:21
13.	"Tú"	2:59
14.	"Si La Ves"	3:24
15.	"My Fantasy" (featuring Sofla Kingz)	3:35
16.	"Honey, I Do"	3:49
17.	"Overtime" (Outro)	4:14
Total length:		53:45

Bonus Tracks
No.	Title	Length
18.	"Shorty, Shorty (Remix HSP)"	3:01
19.	"Shorty, Shorty (Pop Version)"	2:59
20.	"Te Extraño"	3:32
Total length:		01:03:17

Platinum Edition - CD
No.	Title	Length
1.	"No Me Digas Que No" (featuring Adrienne Bailon)	3:38
2.	"Poderte Amar Así a.k.a Deseos Por Mí"	3:16
3.	"Shorty, Shorty"	2:54
4.	"Hiliana"	2:57
5.	"¿Adónde Se Fue?"	3:05
6.	"Her Broken Heart"	3:15
7.	"Es Amor"	3:06
8.	"I'm Sorry" (Interdule)	1:19
9.	"Discúlpame"	2:55
10.	"The Way I Feel"	3:46
11.	"Te Vas De Aquí"	3:10
12.	"Mientes"	3:40
13.	"¿Adónde Se Fue?" (Pop Version)	3:21
14.	"Tú"	2:59
15.	"Si La Ves"	3:24
16.	"My Fantasy" (featuring Sofla Kingz)	3:35
17.	"Honey, I Do"	3:49
18.	"Shorty, Shorty" (Pop Version)	2:59
19.	"Shorty, Shorty" (English Version)	2:57
Total length:		01:00:04

Platinum Edition - DVD
No.	Title	Length
1.	"¿Adónde Se Fue?" (Music Video)	3:05
2.	"Hiliana" (Music Video)	3:19
3.	"Shorty, Shorty" (Music Video)	2:57
4.	"Te Extraño" (Music Video)	3:37
5.	"¿Adónde Se Fue?" (Live)	3:13
6.	"Hiliana" (Live)	2:57
7.	"Te Extraño" (Live)	3:32
8.	"No Me Digas Que No" (featuring Adrienne Bailon) (Live)	3:46
9.	"Shorty, Shorty" (Live)	2:44
10.	"Making Of ¿Adónde Se Fue?"	5:04

== Charts ==
=== Weekly charts ===
Chart (2006–07)	Peak Position
US Heatseekers Albums (Billboard)	4
US Top Latin Albums (Billboard)	13
US Tropical Albums (Billboard)	2

=== Year-end charts ===
Chart (2007)	Position
US Top Latin Albums (Billboard)	35
US Tropical Albums (Billboard)	5
Chart (2008)	Position
US Tropical Albums (Billboard)	12

== Sales and certifications ==
Region	Certification	Certified units/sales
United States (RIAA)	Platinum (Latin)	100,000^{^}
^{^} Shipments figures based on certification alone.
