= Alex Bueno =

Dominican musical artist (1963–2026)

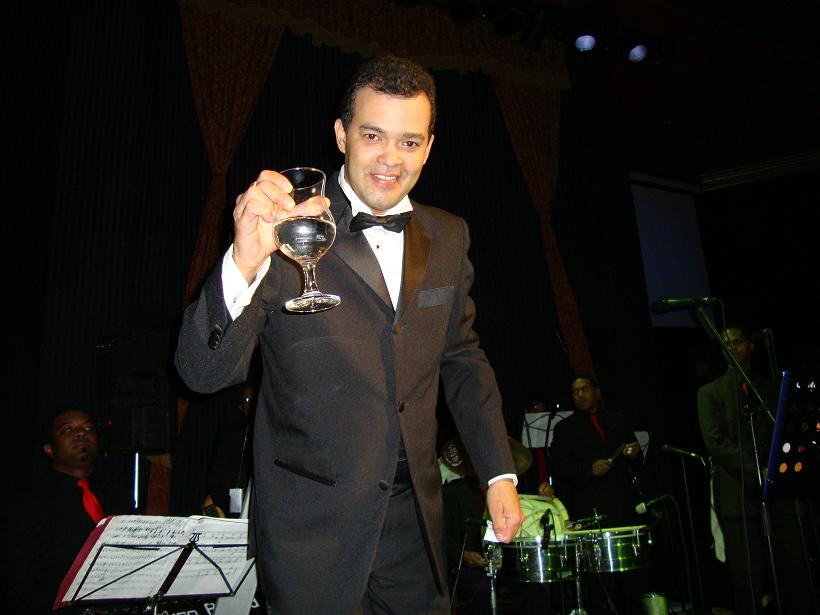

Background information
- Also known as: El Mayimbito; El Ruiseñor De La Sierra
- Born: Alejandro Wigberto Bueno López; 6 September 1963; San José de las Matas, Santiago Province, Dominican Republic
- Died: 18 June 2026 (aged 62) New York City, U.S.
- Genres: Merengue; Bachata; Salsa; Bolero; Ballad
- Occupations: Singer and guitarist
- Years active: 1978–2026
- Labels: Karen Records; J & N Records
- Spouse: Sarah Arias (m. 2013)

Alejandro Wigberto Bueno López (6 September 1963 – 18 June 2026), known professionally as Alex Bueno and affectionately by his nicknames "El Mayimbito" and "El Ruiseñor de la Sierra", was a singer and guitarist from the Dominican Republic. He specialized in merengue and bachata, but also had success in salsa, bolero, merengue típico, and ballad.

== Life and career ==
=== Background ===
Alex Bueno, the child of Santiago Bueno and Francisca López, hails from San José de las Matas, Dominican Republic. Growing up, Bueno was surrounded by music. His mother and grandmother would sing and play guitar, his father played guitar and violin, and his brother, Felipe Bueno, was also a singer. Always having a passion for music, Bueno would sing at family reunions, at school, and in his local church. Very early in the singer's life, at about 13 years of age, Bueno was exposed to alcohol. At 16 years of age, he began smoking marijuana, and at 17 years of age he began experimenting with cocaine. This early exposure would result in a very long, highly publicized struggle with substance and alcohol abuse.

Bueno struggled with alcoholism, but he was able to overcome it. He achieved complete sobriety in 2014. He credited this accomplishment to his renewed Christian faith, stating that he constantly prayed for the strength to stop. He claimed that by reconnecting with God, he was blessed and one day woke up no longer craving alcohol. He also attributed his recovery to the unwavering support of his wife, Sarah Arias, whom he married in 2013.

=== Career ===
Hoping to make a life out of his passion for music, Bueno moved to the capital of the Dominican Republic, Santo Domingo, in hopes of breaking out onto the music scene. He joined Gerardo Vera’s All-Stars in 1978 after winning first place in a local talent contest, which immediately showcased his exceptional vocal clarity. Later, in 1982, he formed Orquesta Liberación with the help of acclaimed saxophonist Andrés de Jesus. The group consisted of Bueno as the lead singer and quickly dominated the airwaves. While working with Orquesta Liberación, the group released four highly successful albums: "Alex y Orquesta Liberación", "Alex", "Negrita Ingrata", and "La Orquesta Tuca Musical Vol. 2".

In 1984, Bueno decided to pursue a solo career, allowing him greater freedom to explore different musical genres, particularly romantic ballads and salsa, proving his voice was not limited to just merengue. The years 1991 and 1992 were incredibly influential in Bueno's career as he released monumental hits such as "Jardín Prohibido", "Querida", "Esa Pared", and "Como Nadie". This era solidified his reputation as one of the premier vocalists in Latin America.

Further into his career, in 1998, Bueno made a pivotal shift and began to experiment with bachata, releasing the landmark album "Bachata a su Tiempo". At the time, bachata was still gaining mainstream acceptance, and Bueno's transition into the genre with his refined, melodic voice gave bachata a new level of romantic elegance and commercial viability. He continued to dominate the bachata charts into the 2000s, releasing massive hits such as "Busca un Confidente" and "Que Vuelva". Bueno's high-quality productions played a crucial role in the international explosion of bachata music.

Throughout his extensive career, Bueno collaborated with many other artists from the Dominican Republic, including Antony Santos, Romeo Santos, Fernando Villalona, and Juan Luis Guerra. As a result of his contributions to Latin culture, Bueno received numerous accolades, including performances at the Coca-Cola Music Stage in Puerto Rico, Soberano al Merito awards (the highest artistic honor in the Dominican Republic), Premio Lo Nuestro awards, and a Latin Grammy nomination for his acclaimed album "20 años después". Cementing his legacy, his life story and musical journey were slated to be immortalized in a documentary made in collaboration with Netflix.

=== Death ===
In September 2025, Bueno was diagnosed with a brain tumor. His health gradually deteriorated over the following months due to complications and metastasis. Bueno died at a hospital in New York City, on the morning of June 18, 2026, at the age of 62; his death was officially confirmed by his family and management team later that day.

== Discography ==
=== With Fernando Villalona ===
1982: ¡Feliz cumbé!

1. Feliz cumbé
2. Y ya pa' qué
3. Piel canela
4. En dónde estás
5. Yo quisiera
6. El jumo
7. Campesina dominicana
8. Concierto de Aranjuez
9. Lo que tengo

=== With Andrés de Jesús ===
1983: Como quisiera

1. Como quisiera
2. Porque solo a tu lado
3. Tengo miedo
4. El sacrificio
5. Porque te quiero
6. ¿Y cómo es él?
7. Las locas
8. Sigue tu vida

=== With Orquesta Liberación ===
1985: Alex & Orquesta Liberación

1. Querida
2. Me va, me va
3. El hijo de Yemaya
4. La radio
5. Indiferencia
6. Qué cara más bonita
7. Amor divino
8. La colegiala
9. Quiero conocerte
10. Esa pared

1985: Álex

1. Una paloma blanca
2. Me muero por ella
3. Corazón de madera
4. Quién te riza el pelo
5. Ojitos negros
6. Quiero abrazarte tanto
7. Mil amores
8. Un mechón de tu cabello
9. El hombre callejero
10. Dime cuando tú

1988: Con fe y sentimiento

1. Quiero que elijas el lugar
2. El niño y el canario
3. Amorcito de mi vida
4. Dímelo mi vida
5. A donde va nuestro amor
6. Lucía
7. Amarrao con fe
8. La ruleta (sé perder)

=== With Sergio Vargas ===
1988: Juntos

1. Maquinolandera
2. Columbia Rock
3. Amor amor
4. Causas y azares
5. Tu ausencia
6. En bandolera
7. El amor acaba
8. Sin ti no soy nada
9. Quiero perderme contigo
10. Quiero llenarte toda
11. Pero lo dudo

=== As a soloist ===
1990: Álex Bueno

1. A donde vayas
2. Si volvieras
3. María del Mar
4. Esa mujer
5. Noches de fantasía
6. El jardín prohibido
7. Gigante
8. Mi pobre corazón
9. Ninguno de los dos
10. El malquerido

1991: ¡Como nadie!

1. Como nadie
2. Número cero
3. El pitico
4. Soy rebelde
5. El talismán
6. Solo por el mundo
7. Una lágrima por tu amor
8. Entre tu amor y mi amor

1992: Ternuras

1. Un imposible amor
2. Por ella
3. Quiéreme
4. El hijo mío
5. Hipócrita
6. Amor de pobre
7. La distancia
8. Que voy hacer amor
9. Alguien durmió en mi cama
10. Desperté llamándote

1994: Amores que matan

1. Amores que matan
2. He vuelto a nacer
3. Si te vas
4. La prisa
5. Nuestro juramento
6. Él o yo
7. Las hojas verdes del verano
8. A quién
9. Aunque no me quieras más
10. Solo el amor

1996: Me equivoqué

1. Agua dulce, agua sala
2. Irresistible
3. Otro weekend sin ti
4. Mujer buena
5. Y qué culpa tengo yo
6. Si vos te vas
7. Te extraño
8. Me equivoqué
9. Los caminos de la vida
10. Quien soy yo sin ella

1997: Más ternura

1. Si la ves
2. Dime
3. A través de un cristal
4. Corona de oro
5. El eco de mi canto
6. Está es tu canción (Alguien cantó)
7. Acúsame
8. Pasacantando
9. Amor de antes
10. Veneno con miel

1998: Bachata a su tiempo

1. Busco un confidente
2. Ese hombre soy yo
3. Tengo pero me faltas tú
4. Perdóname
5. De madrugada
6. Si vinieras hoy
7. Paso a paso
8. Gotas de pena
9. Un poco de ti
10. Me duele
11. Lo que yo siento por ti

2000: Corazón duro

1. No te descuides
2. Que vuelva
3. Yo me iré
4. Sublime mujer
5. Corazón duro
6. Adiós
7. Quítame la vida
8. La pretendida
9. Solo sé que te quiero
10. Dame tu amor
11. Pasacantando

2001: Únicamente tú

1. Únicamente tú
2. He sabido que te amaba
3. Acuérdate de mí
4. Vuelve
5. Pensando en ti
6. Entrega
7. Qué cosas te hice yo
8. Amor sin esperanza
9. Mi pobre corazón
10. Adorada ilusión
11. Pena de hombre

2002: Solo merengue

1. Lluvia
2. Jamás podré olvidar
3. Mátame la pena
4. Solo me importas tú
5. Que daría yo
6. No me hables
7. Cuando quieras voy a verte (madre mía)
8. Entre tú y yo
9. El triste

2002: Pídeme

1. Si tú estuvieras
2. Vuela, mariposa
3. Ven, sálvame
4. Tres noches
5. Con el alma desnuda
6. Pídeme
7. Amarte así me hace mal
8. Corazón enamorado
9. Que nadie opine nada
10. Un minuto de ti
11. Mojado por ti

2007: Queda algo

1. A buscar qué
2. Quién lo haría por ti
3. Queda algo
4. Samaritana
5. Esta triste guitarra
6. Si yo pudiera
7. Nuestro amor
8. Olvídame tú (bachata)
9. Dime qué sientes
10. Una mañana
11. Y yo en mi rincón

2008: Mensajes

1. Un nuevo amor
2. Agárrense de las manos
3. Se busca
4. Aleluya
5. Cómo no creer en Dios
6. Jesucristo
7. Amigo
8. Después de la caída
9. El buen pastor
10. Dios debe estar muy triste
