= Te Extraño =

Single by Xtreme

from the album Xtreme
- Released: 2003 (Original); 2005 (Remake)
- Recorded: 2003 (Original); 2005 (Remake)
- Genre: Bachata
- Length: 4:00 (Original); 3:32 (2005 Remake); 4:19 (R&B)
- Label: 2 Strong Music; SGZ Entertainment; Univision Music Group
- Songwriters: Danny Mejia (Danny D), Anthony López

Xtreme singles chronology
"Te Extraño" (2003)	"Honey I Do" (2005)

Music video
- "Te Extraño" on YouTube

"Te Extraño" (English: "I Miss You") is a song by American group Xtreme. It serve as the first single for their self titled debut album, Xtreme (2005). The song was originally recorded in 2003 for their original first album, We Got Next (2003). They were independent at the time until they were signed with Sergio George's SGZ Entertainment in 2005 and then remade the song in 2005 as their debut single. An R&B version is also included on both albums.

== Music video ==
The music video shows the group, which included Elvis Rosario before his departure, performing on a stage while a few females watch them on a TV screen.

== Charts ==
Chart (2005–2006)	Peak Position
US Hot Latin Songs (Billboard)	31
US Latin Airplay (Billboard)	31
US Latin Rhythm Airplay (Billboard)	22
US Regional Mexican Airplay (Billboard)	34
US Tropical Airplay (Billboard)	13
