= El Culpable Soy Yo =

Studio album by Cristian Castro
- Released: April 28, 2009
- Recorded: October 2008 – February 2009; Cosmos Studios; Elith Sound Labs (Mexico City, Mexico); Signature Sound Studio; Studio West (San Diego, California); The Treehouse Recording Studios (Miami, Florida)
- Genre: Latin pop
- Length: 42:08
- Label: Universal Music Latino
- Producer: A.B. Quintanilla · Armando Ávila · Christian Leuzzi · Kiko Cibrián

Cristian Castro chronology
El Indomable (2007)	El Culpable Soy Yo (2009)	Viva el Principe (2010)

Singles from El Culpable Soy Yo
- 1. "No Me Digas" Released: March 2, 2009; 2. "El Culpable Soy Yo" Released: May 11, 2009

El Culpable Soy Yo (The Guilty I Am) is the 12th studio album recorded by Mexican singer-songwriter Cristian Castro, It was released by Universal Music Latino on April 28, 2009. The album was produced by A.B. Quintanilla. The 5th song on the album features his grandmother Socorro Castro mother of Verónica Castro. At the Premio Lo Nuestro 2010 awards, the album was nominated Pop Album of the Year losing to La Quinta Estación's Sin Frenos.

== Track listing ==
No.	Title	Writer(s)	Producer(s)	Length
1.	"En Este Bar (Odio Que Te Quiero)"	A.B. Quintanilla III, Luigi Giraldo	A.B. Quintanilla III, Luigi Giraldo	04:02
2.	"Como Dos Tontos"	Edgar Cortazar, Ernesto Cortazar	Kiko Cibrian	03:47
3.	"Ten Valor (No Te Alejes Mas)"	Cristian Castro, Armando Ávila, Christian Sánchez	Armando Ávila	03:47
4.	"Por La Espalda"	América Jiménez, Dany Tomas	Kiko Cibrian	03:58
5.	"Mi Bien Amada Y Yo (Mi Bien Amada)" (Featuring Socorro Castro)	Cristian Castro	Kiko Cibrian	04:31
6.	"Nuestra Verdad"	Christian Leuzzi	Christian Leuzzi	04:23
7.	"No Me Digas"	A.B. Quintanilla III, Luigi Giraldo	A.B. Quintanilla III, Luigi Giraldo	03:10
8.	"No Engañes Al Amor"	Christian Leuzzi	Christian Leuzzi	03:41
9.	"Eres Tú"	Patricia Loaiza, Reuven "Paquirri" Amiel	Kiko Cibrian	03:55
10.	"El Culpable Soy Yo"	Gloria España	Armando Ávila	03:39
11.	"No Me Digas (Balada Version)"	A.B. Quintanilla III, Luigi Giraldo	Luigi Giraldo	03:26

iTunes Bonus Tracks
No.	Title	Length
12.	"Seguir Sin Ti"	03:45
13.	"No Me Digas" ([House Remix])	04:31
Total length:		67:31

== Chart positions ==
Year	Chart	Peak
2009	Latin Pop Albums	3
2009	Top Latin Albums	7
