= El Indomable =

Studio album by Cristian Castro
- Released: June 26, 2007
- Recorded: 2006–2007
- Genre: Ranchera, mariachi
- Length: 46:42
- Label: Universal Music Mexico
- Producer: Pedro Ramírez, Vicente Fernández

Cristian Castro chronology
Días Felices (2005)	El Indomable (2007)	El Culpable Soy Yo (2009)

Singles from El Indomable
- 1. "Te Sigo Queriendo" Released: May 26, 2007; 2. "Tu Retirada" Released: June 29, 2007

El Indomable (The Indomitable) is the 11th studio album by Cristian Castro. It was his first ranchera and mariachi crossover attempt. It iwas produced by Pedro Ramírez and Vicente Fernández. The first single released from the album was José Alfredo Jiménez's "Tu Retirada". Up to July 11, 2007, the album has sold 12,868 copies in the US. El Indomable was nominated at The Latin Grammy Awards of 2007 for Regional Mexican Album of the Year.

== Track listing ==
1. ¿Que Amor Me Quedará?
2. Golondrina Presumida - (featuring Vicente Fernández)
3. Te Sigo Queriendo
4. Mi México De Ayer
5. No Volveré
6. Divina Ilusión
7. Tu Retirada
8. Sin Fé Y Sin Religión
9. Si Acaso Vuelves
10. El Indomable

Bonus tracks (gold edition)

1. Hay Un Momento
2. Presentimiento
3. La Caminera
4. Morena De Ojos Negros (featuring Vicente Fernández)
5. No Soy Monedita De Oro (iTunes exclusive)

== Chart positions ==
Year	Chart	Album	Peak
2007	Mexico AMPROFON Albums Chart	El Indomable	9
2007	U.S. Billboard Regional Mexican Albums	El Indomable	1
2007	U.S. Billboard 200	El Indomable	114
2007	U.S. Billboard Top Latin Albums	El Indomable	4

== Sales and certifications ==
Region	Certification	Certified units/sales
United States (RIAA)	Platinum (Latin)	100,000^{^}
^{^} Shipments figures based on certification alone.
