= Mi Corazoncito =

Single by Aventura

from the album K.O.B. Live
- Released: January 15, 2007
- Recorded: 2006
- Genre: Bachata
- Length: 3:54
- Label: Premium Latin
- Songwriter: Anthony "Romeo" Santos
- Producers: Lenny Santos; Anthony Santos; Henry Santos Jeter

Aventura singles chronology
"Los Infieles" (2006)	"Mi Corazoncito" (2007)	"El Perdedor" (2008)

Music video
- "Mi Corazoncito" on YouTube

"Mi Corazoncito" (English: My Little Heart) is Aventura's second single from their second live album K.O.B. Live (2006). The song reached big recognition in many Spanish-speaking countries and reached number two on the Billboard Hot Latin Tracks chart. The song was featured in GTA Online: The Contract (2021), in the fictional radio station Motomami Los Santos.

== Music video ==
The music video for "Mi Corazoncito" shows Romeo looking at a picture of a girl he is in love with and he is imagining that she is in love with him, while in reality, she keeps pushing him away. In the end, they end up being in love with each other.

== Charts ==
=== Weekly charts ===
Chart (2007)	Peak position
Switzerland (Schweizer Hitparade)	84
US Bubbling Under Hot 100 (Billboard)	7
US Hot Latin Songs (Billboard)	2
US Latin Rhythm Airplay (Billboard)	1
US Tropical Airplay (Billboard)	1
Chart (2008)	Peak position
US Latin Pop Airplay (Billboard)	15
Chart (2009)	Peak position
Nicaragua (EFE)	5

=== Year-end charts ===
Chart (2007)	Position
US Hot Latin Songs (Billboard)	1
Chart (2008)	Position
US Hot Latin Songs (Billboard)	30

== Awards ==
"Mi Corazoncito" received two awards in the 2008 Latin Billboard Music Awards for "Hot Latin Song of the Year" and "Tropical Airplay Song of the Year" by a Duo or Group. The song also received an award at the Premio Lo Nuestro 2008 for "Tropical Song of the Year".
