= Carlos & Alejandra =

American music duo

- Born: Carlos Vargas Franco Jr. August 27, 1984 (age 42); East Meadow, New York, U.S. Bianca Alejandra Feliz; January 4, 1987 (age 39); Santo Domingo, Dominican Republic
- Origin: Carlos; The Bronx, New York; Alejandra; Boston, Massachusetts, U.S.
- Genre: Bachata
- Years active: 2006-2016
- Labels: Romance Records; Machete Music; Universal Music Latin Entertainment
- Past members: Carlos Vargas; Alejandra Feliz

Carlos & Alejandra were an American music duo that focused on the genre of bachata. The duo is composed of members Carlos Vargas Franco Jr. and Bianca Alejandra Feliz. Despite the success of the duo, they split in 2016, with each following their own separate paths as solo artists.

== Early life ==
=== Carlos Vargas ===
Carlos Vargas Franco Jr. was raised in The Bronx, New York. He paired with Alejandra by music label Romance Records. He is of Dominican descent and born on August 27, 1984. Carlos was offered work in the bachata group Aventura, but he rejected the offer.

=== Alejandra Feliz ===
Born Bianca Alejandra Feliz on January 4, 1987, to a Dominican father and a Puerto Rican mother. She studied in Boston Arts Academy, and in Boston's Suffolk University graduating in Penal Law.

She worked in music, fashion and modelling and in 2004 won a beauty pageant contest crowned Miss Anacaona. She also took part in TV show Action Lights, Camera presenting a segment on fashion and show business. After one and a half years, she decided to concentrate fully on music. She met Carlos Vargas through mutual interest in bachata.

== History ==
=== Formation, La Introducción, and main stream success (2006-2016) ===
Carlos and Alejandra were working under Romance Records. Originally they were pursuing solo careers. Alejandra was pursuing an R&B career. However, The record label decided to unite the two and form a bachata duo. They released the single, "Explicame" for their first album, Destiny in 2007. It became an instant hit in the Billboard charts.

In 2009, they signed with Machete Music, thus release what is considered their debut album La Introducción on April 21, 2009. It featured the singles, "Cafecito", "Perdóname", and "Cuanto Duele" which peaked at number 6 on the Billboard Tropical Airplay chart. The album was a success as it peaked at number 4 on the Billboard Tropical Albums chart. It was nominated for Tropical Album of the Year in the Awards Ceremony Premios Lo Nuestro 2010. In 2010, they released an extended version titled "La Introducción...Continued".

In 2011 and 2012, they released a few singles to promote an album that was supposed to be released in 2012 or 2013. The album was going to be titled as Breaking Grounds. However, the album was never released. Instead, the group continued to release more singles until they would eventually separate in 2016.

=== Post-duo solo careers (2016-present) ===
==== Carlos ====
After the breakup, Carlos continued a solo career under the stage name Circharles. Under that name he released his solo album Alter Ego on February 21, 2017, with singles like "Empeñaria mi vida" and"Si Me Dejas". Later on, he released singles like "Besos Toxicos" and "Tu Judini".

==== Alejandra ====
After the break-up she embarked on a solo career. In 2017, she releases a song along with Dennis Fernando as a soundtrack for Season 2 of the Telemundo Colombian TV show Sin Senos Sí Hay Paraíso. On October 16, 2019, she released her solo album Ahora Es Que Falta in 2019.

== Discography ==
=== Albums ===
Together

- Destiny (2007)
- La Introduccion (2009)

Solo Albums

Circharles

- Alter Ego (2017)
- Nostalgia (2024)

EPs

- El Baul (2018)
- Esencia (2021)

Alejandra Feliz

- Ahora Es Que Falta (2019)

=== Singles ===
These singles are from songs not included in an album or singles from other artists.

==== Together ====
As Lead Artists

- 2006: "Doña Rosa"
- 2011: "Its Okay"
- 2012: "Melodia De Amor" (feat. Lenny Santos)
- 2012: "Karma"
- 2012: "En Sueños"
- 2013: "Mirame"
- 2013: "Como Quisiera"
- 2013: "Se Robo"
- 2014: "Tu Dolor De Cabeza"
- 2015: "Que Falto"
- 2016: "Quiero Ser"

Featurings

- 2009: "El Culpable Soy Yo (Bachata Version)" (with Cristian Castro)
- 2009: "Devuélveme La Navidad" (with Xtreme)

==== Solo Singles ====
===== Circharles =====
As Lead Singer

- 2017: "Besos Toxicos"
- 2018: "Tu Judini"
- 2018: "El Destrono"
- 2018: "Mi Venganza"
- 2019: "Que Me Escuchen"
- 2019: "Como Yo Hago"
- 2019: "Fue Mi Error"
- 2019: "Una Extraña Mas"
- 2019: "Vistete De Blanco"
- 2020: "Limpia Tus Lágrimas"
- 2020: "El Arte De Amar"
- 2021: "Arrepentida" (featuring Santana)
- 2022: "La Historia"
- 2022: "Fatal"

Featurings

- 2016: "El Día (Que Te Lleve El Diablo)" (with Exceder)
- 2018: "Era Mentira" (with Bachata Heightz)
- 2020: "Amigo" (with Brandon)

===== Alejandra Feliz =====
As Lead Singer

- 2017: "Fuiste Tú" (feat. Jeyro)
- 2017: "Pierdes Tu"
- 2019: "Animales" (From SP Polanco's Compilation Album Bchta Rising)
- 2021: "No Me Pregunten Por El"

Featurings

- 2017: "Nunca Me Fui" (with Dennis Fernando) - Sound Track for Season 2 of the Telemundo Colombian TV show Sin Senos Sí Hay Paraíso (With Out Brest, There Is A Paradise).
- 2019: "Creeme" (with Ricky G)
