= Xtreme (group) =

American music group

- Origin: Bronx, New York, U.S.
- Genres: Bachata
- Years active: 2003-2011, 2019-2020, 2022
- Labels: Univision Music Group (2006-2008); Universal/Machete (2008-2011)
- Members: Danny D Steve Styles
- Past members: Elvis Rosario

Xtreme is an American music duo consisting of members Danny D (born as Danny Alfredo Mejía on July 23, 1985) and Steve Styles (born as Steven Tejada on November 25, 1985) of Dominican descent. The duo focuses on the Dominican genre bachata. Xtreme was formed in 2003 and has enjoyed success among Hispanics in the United States. The original line-up included another vocalist, Elvis Rosario, who was also a guitarist in the group. He left after 2005 or 2006. Xtreme has enjoyed success with singles like Te Extraño, Shorty, Shorty, ¿Adónde Se Fue?, No Me Digas Que No, among others.

== History ==
=== Formation and We Got Next (2003-2004) ===
The group was discovered in 2003 by Andre "Dre" Hidalgo. He is the owner and founder of the independent record label 2 Strong Music, which started the careers of Bachata artists and groups such as Aventura and Prince Royce. Dre discovered Danny D at age 17. Later he added Elvis Rosario to the line-up. It also featured 3 more members as the band was originally a five-man group. They released their original first album, We Got Next, in 2003. The album featured the original versions of the songs "Te Extraño" and "Honey I Do", which both became successful later on. However, due to lack of recognition, the album didn't do well. In 2004, they would recruit Steve Styles and with the other 3 members no longer in the group, the band became a trio with the line-up being Styles, Danny, and Elvis. That year they released a remixed version of We Got Next.

=== A new beginning, debut album, Rosario's departure, and Haciendo Historia (2005-2007) ===
In 2005, the group signed to Sergio George's SGZ Entertainment. George, along with George Zamora, would re-invent the group and give them a new start. Their self-titled debut album, Xtreme, was released on June 28, 2005. This was Styles' first appearance on an album due to the fact that he was not part of the group back in 2003. The debut album peaked at number 14 on the Billboard Tropical Albums chart. Its lead single was a remake of the song "Te Extraño". This remake peaked at number 13 on the Billboard Tropical Airplay chart. In late 2005 or early 2006, Elvis Rosario departed from the group, which caused Xtreme to become a duo only consisting of Steve Styles and Danny D as the line-up that everyone knows today. The line-up that would become a success in the years that followed. Because of Rosario's departure, a re-issued version of the album was released on April 18, 2006, which only had Steve and Danny on the cover. This was also do to the fact that they signed with Univision Music Group.

Haciendo Historia, the group's second album, was released on November 21, 2006. On the Billboard charts it peaked at number 13 on the Top Latin Albums chart, at number 4 on the Heatseekers Albums chart, and at number 2 on the Tropical Albums chart. It is their first and only album to be certified platinum by the Recording Industry Association of America (RIAA) in the United States. The album's lead single, "Shorty, Shorty", is their most successful single on the Billboard charts. It peaked at number 2 on the Hot Latin Songs chart and at number 1 on the Tropical Airplay chart. On November 20, 2007, they released the Platinum Edition of the album. It included two versions of "Shorty, Shorty", one fully Spanish pop version, and a fully English version. It also featured two extra songs: "Poderte Amar Así a.k.a Deseos Por Mí" and "No Me Digas Que No", which featured Adrienne Bailon. It peaked at number 3 on the Billboard Latin Rhythm Airplay chart.

=== Chapter Dos, On The Verge, and last performances (2008-2011) ===
Their third album, Chapter Dos, was released on November 24, 2008. On the Billboard charts, it peaked at number 7 on the Heatseekers Albums chart, and at number 1 on the Tropical Albums chart, making it their first number 1 album on that chart. Its first single, "Through That Window (Enamorado Estoy)", did well on the Billboard charts as it peaked at number 27 on the Hot Latin Songs chart, at number 8 on the Latin Rhythm Airplay chart, and at number 5 on the Tropical Airplay chart. Its second single, "Lloro y Lloro", peaked at number 30 on the Billboard Latin Rhythm Airplay chart.

On May 7, 2009, Xtreme premiered on a reality show for Spanish cable network Mun2, On The Verge. On the Verge had the highest rated premiere in 2009, among any of Mun2's original shows. On November 17, 2009, they released Chapter Dos: On the Verge. It was based on the show and was their first album under Universal Music Latin Entertainment after Universal Music Group bought Univision Music Group. This was either a compilation, remake, or a sequel to Chapter Dos. It contained five new songs, ten songs from Chapter Dos, and "Shorty, Shorty" from Haciendo Historia. Of the five new songs; three were singles, two of which peaked on the Billboard Tropical Airplay chart. One was "Baby, Baby", which peaked at number 34. The other single was "Devuélveme La Navidad", which was a Christmas song and peaked at number 37. It featured the American bachata duo Carlos & Alejandra. In the same year, they released the EP 6 Super Hits. This is part of a series of albums involving multiple artists from Universal Music.

In 2010, they released the song "Y Vas A Llorar". It served as the single for the duo's first and only compilation album, Los Subestimados, which was released in 2011. In the same year, Xtreme went on a hiatus so the members could pursue solo careers. Their final concert was held at the 4th Annual Sydney International Bachata Festival in 2011. While they were performing "Te Extraño", Tanja 'La Alemana' Kensinger and Jorge 'Ataca' Burgos performed their famous bachata routine.

=== Hiatuses and reunions (2011–present) ===
After the separation, Danny D started a solo career. His first single, "Eres Mi Todo", was released on March 20 2012. It peaked at number 9 on the Billboard Tropical Airplay chart. Despite its success, he didn't release another single for the next four years. Steve Styles was originally planning to be a solo artist. He met with Lenny Santos (Len Melody) from Aventura to create a song. Since Aventura had also split in the same year, Lenny asked Styles if he wanted to form a new group. Styles agreed and along with Lenny's brother Max Santos (Max Agenda), they formed Vena. From 2011 to 2015 Styles released eight singles and an EP live album with them. He went solo in 2015. In 2016, he released his first solo single, "El Final", which was also a single that Lenny and Max Santos released under the Vena name featuring Mike Stanley. Also in 2016, Danny D's second single, "Quédate Un Minuto Mas", was released four years after his first solo single. He then released "Yo Intentare" on September 16 of that year. On May 14, 2017, he released "Your Love". On February 4, 2018, he was featured on the song "Dependo de Ti" by bachata singer Rolly Music. Both Styles and Danny performed shows in night clubs and festivals for the most part.

The duo reunited in 2019 for a reunion tour, their first tour together in seven years. They continued their solo work in 2020. Styles released the single "Yo Quiero Ser" on August 21, 2020. In the same year, Danny D released the single "Mátame" on February 28, 2020. He featured on the song "Dont Leave Me Alone" by D Hollywood on November 2, 2020. On May 14 2021, he released "Dreams", an English R&B song. On December 6, 2021, they announced their return on social media. On the same day, they announced their 2022 tour, their first tour since the COVID-19 pandemic. On New Year's Day, 2022, they announced that new music was coming for 2022. However, no new songs were ever released. Their tour would last the whole year, concluding in December of 2022.

The duo has continued their solo careers, as Styles is currently working on his first solo album. He posted a video on social media showing him working on his next solo project in a studio along with his former partner from Vena, Max Agende. Danny D re-released the single "Mátame" on May 19, 2023. This gained a little more success than the original 2020 version. On November 22, 2023 he released the single "Mujer Callejera". On January 17, 2024, he released a Christian single titled "Hermoso Momento", which is a cover of a song by Christian music group Kairo Worship. On March 18, 2024 he released "La Decisión".

== Discography ==
Studio albums

- 2003: We Got Next (2 Strong Music)
- 2005: Xtreme (SGZ Entertainment & Re-issued by Univision Music Group)
- 2006: Haciendo Historia (La Calle Records & Univision Music Group)
- 2008: Chapter Dos (Machete Music)
- 2009: Chapter Dos: On The Verge (Machete Music & Universal Music Latin Entertainment)

EPs

- 2009: 6 Super Hits

Compilation albums

- 2011: Los Subestimados

=== Singles ===
Year	Single	Chart positions						Album	Certifications
Year	Single	U.S. Hot Latin Songs	U.S. Latin Pop	U.S. Latin Rhythm	U.S. Latin Streaming Songs	U.S. Regional Mexican	U.S. Latin Tropical	Album	Certifications
2005	"Te Extraño"	31	—	22	9	34	13	Xtreme	
2005	"Honey I Do"	—	—	—	—	—	—	Xtreme	
2006	"Shorty, Shorty"	2	28	3	—	—	1	Haciendo Historia	
2007	"¿Adónde Se Fue?"	—	—	17	—	—	24	Haciendo Historia	
2007	"Hiliana"	—	—	—	—	—	—	Haciendo Historia	
2007	"No Me Digas Que No" (featuring Adrienne Bailon)	26	—	3	—	—	24	Haciendo Historia (Platinum Edition)	
2008	"Through That Window (Enamorado Estoy)"	27	—	8	—	—	5	Chapter Dos	
2008	"Lloro y Lloro"	—	—	30	—	—	—	Chapter Dos	
2009	"Vuelve"	—	—	—	—	—	—	Chapter Dos: On The Verge	
2009	"Baby, Baby"	—	—	—	—	—	34	Chapter Dos: On The Verge	
2009	"Devuélveme La Navidad" (featuring Carlos & Alejandra)	—	—	—	—	—	37	Chapter Dos: On The Verge	
2010	"Y Vas A Llorar"	—	—	—	—	—	—	Los Subestimados	
