= I Love You =

The phrase "I love you" is a declaration of love.

I Love You, I Love U, or I Luv U may refer to:

== Film and television ==
=== Films ===
- I Love You (1918 film), a silent drama written by Catherine Carr, starring Alma Rubens
- I Love You (1925 film), a German silent drama, starring Liane Haid
- I Love You (1938 film), a German drama directed by Herbert Selpin, starring Viktor de Kowa
- I Love You (1979 Kannada film), an Indian film starring Shankar Nag
- I Love You (1979 Telugu film), an Indian film directed by Vayunandana Rao, starring Chiranjeevi
- I Love You (1981 film), a Brazilian drama directed by Arnaldo Jabor, starring Sônia Braga
- I Love You (1982 film), a Pakistani Urdu film starring Waheed Murad
- I Love You (1986 film), a French-Italian drama directed by Marco Ferreri, starring Christopher Lambert
- I Love You (1992 film), an Indian Hindi-language film directed by Vara Prasad, starring Prashanth
- I Love You, a 2001 South Korean film starring Oh Ji-ho
- I Love You (2002 film), a Chinese drama directed by Zhang Yuan, starring Xu Jinglei
- I Love You (2004 film), an Indian Odia-language film directed by Hara Patnaik, starring Anubhav Mohanty
- I Love You (2005 Croatian film), directed by Dalibor Matanić, starring Krešimir Mikić
- I Love You (2007 Bengali film), an Indian Bengali-language film directed by Ravi Kinagi, starring Dev
- I Love You (2007 Mozambican film), a short film made for UNESCO and directed by Rogério Manjate
- I Love You (2012 film), a Bangladeshi film directed by Mushfiqur Rahman Gulzar starring Shakib Khan
- I Love You (2019 film), an Indian Kannada-language film directed by R. Chandru, starring Upendra
- I Love You (2023 film), an Indian Hindi-language film directed by Nikhil Mahajan, starring Rakul Preet Singh

=== Television ===
- I Love You, a 2010 TV comedy special by Jake Johannsen
- "I Love You" (Everybody Loves Raymond), a 1996 episode
- "I Love You" (The Good Doctor), a 2020 episode

== Music ==
=== Albums ===
- I Love You (Aaradhna album), 2006
- I Love You (Amanda Blank album), 2009
- I Love You (Diana Ross album) or the title song, 2006
- I Love You (Erica Campbell album), 2023
- I Love You (Megumi Nakajima album), 2010
- I Love You (Teen Jesus and the Jean Teasers album) or the title song, 2023
- I Love You (The Neighbourhood album), 2013
- I Love U (Mr. Children album), 2005
- I Love You (A Dedication to My Fans), by Jadakiss, 2011
- I Love You, by Desireless, 1994
- I Love You, by Elek Bacsik, 1975
- I Love You, by Imants Kalniņš, 1999
- I Love You, by People!, 1968
- I Love You, by Stephanie Nakasian, 2006
- I Love You, by T.Love, 1994
- I Love You (EP), by Said the Whale, or the title song, 2013

=== Songs ===
- "I Love You" (2NE1 song), 2012
- "I Love You" (Axwell & Ingrosso song), 2017
- "I Love You" (Billie Eilish song), 2019
- "I Love You" (Cliff Richard song), 1960
- "I Love You" (Climax Blues Band song), 1981
- "I Love You" (Cole Porter song), 1944
- "I Love You" (Donna Summer song), 1977
- "I Love You" (EXID song), 2018
- "I Love You" (Faith Evans song), 2002
- "I Love You" (Ghali song), 2019
- "I Love You" (Martina McBride song), 1999
- "I Love You" (Mary J. Blige song), 1995, not to be confused with "I Love U (Yes I Du)" (see below)
- "I Love You" (Otis Leavill song), 1969
- "I Love You" (Taeyeon song), 2010
- "I Love You" (Tone Damli song), 2010
- "I Love You" (Treasure song), 2020
- "I Love You" (Vanilla Ice song), 1990
- "I Love You" (Vasyl Lazarovich song), 2010
- "I Love You" (Woodkid song), 2013
- "I Love You" (Yello song), 1983
- "I Love You" (The Zombies song), 1965
- "I Love You (Miss Robot)", 1980, by The Buggles
- "I Love You (What Can I Say)", 1978, by Jerry Reed
- "(I Love You) For Sentimental Reasons", a 1945 popular song
- "Ily (I Love You Baby)", Surf Mesa song, 2019
- "I Love U" (The Chainsmokers song), 2022
- "I Love U" (Tila Tequila song), 2007
- "I Luv U" (Dizzee Rascal song), 2003
- "I Luv U" (The Ordinary Boys song), 2007
- "I Love You", by Amy Grant from Unguarded, 1997
- "I Love You", by Avril Lavigne from Goodbye Lullaby, 2011
- "I Love You", by Black Flag from My War, 1984
- "I Love You", by Celine Dion from Falling into You, also recorded by Faith Hill on Faith, 1996
- "I Love You", by Charice from Charice, 2010
- "I Love You", by Cheri Dennis from In and Out of Love, 2007
- "I Love You", by the Dandy Warhols from ...The Dandy Warhols Come Down, 1997
- "I Love You", by Dave Wang, 1987
- "I Love You", by Debbie Gibson, originally recorded by Yutaka Ozaki, 2010
- "I Love You", by Dru Hill from Dru World Order, 2002
- "I Love You", by Esser, 2009
- "I Love You", by Fontaines D.C. from Skinty Fia, 2022
- "I Love You", by G. Love and Special Sauce from G. Love and Special Sauce, 1994
- "I Love You", by GreatGuys, 2024
- "I Love You", by the Heartbreakers from L.A.M.F., 1977
- "I Love You", by Jim Reeves with Ginny Wright, 1964
- "I Love You", by Layton Greene from Tell Ya Story, 2020
- "I Love You", by Little Mix from Get Weird, 2015
- "I Love You", by Labi Siffre from Labi Siffre, 1970
- "I Love You", by Sabrina from A Flower's Broken, 2019
- "I Love You", by Saigon Kick from Water, 1993
- "I Love You", by Sarah McLachlan from Surfacing, 1997
- "I Love You", by Savage, the stage name of Italian musician Roberto Zanetti, 2020
- "I Love You", by Spacemen 3 from Recurring
- "I Love You", by Shinhwa from Winter Story, 2002
- "I Love You", by Steve Miller Band from Number 5, 1970
- "I Love You..." (Parts I & II), by Tatsuro Yamashita from Big Wave, 1984
- "I Love You", by The Volumes, 1962
- "I Love You", written by Robert Wright and George Forrest from the operetta Song of Norway
- "I Love You", theme song for the television program Barney & Friends
- "I Love You (Prelude to Tragedy)", by HIM from Razorblade Romance
- "I Love U", by Chris Brown from Graffiti
- "I Love U", by Usher from Coming Home
- "I Love U (Yes I Du)", by Mary J. Blige from Stronger with Each Tear, 1994
- "I Love U (You Know I Don't)", by the Frogs from My Daughter the Broad, 1996
- "The I Love You Song", from the Broadway musical The 25th Annual Putnam County Spelling Bee, 2005
- "I <3 You", by Marina from Princess of Power, 2025

=== Performers ===
- I Love You (Yah Tibyah La Blu), an American rock band

== Literature ==
- I Love You (comics), a 1955–1980 romance comic published by Charlton
- I Love Yoo, a 2017– webtoon series written and illustrated by Quimchee

== Other uses ==
- ILY sign, an informal expression in American Sign Language signifying love or esteem
- ILOVEYOU, a computer worm that appeared in May 2000

== See also ==
- 143 (Katy Perry album), whose title represents "I love you"
- Because I Love You (disambiguation)
- I Don't Love You (disambiguation)
- I Love Me (disambiguation)
- I Love You Too (disambiguation)
- I Loved You (disambiguation)
- I Will Always Love You (disambiguation)
- Je t'aime (disambiguation)
- Love (disambiguation)
- Love You (disambiguation)
- Te Amo (disambiguation)
