= Je t'aime =

Je t’aime (a French phrase meaning "I love you") may refer to:

== Music ==
- "Je t'aime" (Lara Fabian song), 1998
- "Je t'aime" (Armand Van Helden song), 2008
- "Je T'aime" (Joy song), 2021
- "Je t'aime", a 2020 song by Capital T
- "Je T'Aime", a song by Psychic TV
- "Je T'aime", a song by Vicious Pink
- "Je t'aime。", a 2021 song by Hoshimachi Suisei

== Film ==
- Je t'aime, a 2010 anime short film by Mamoru Oshii

== See also ==
- Je t'aime, je t'aime, a 1968 French science fiction film
- Je t'aime, je t'aime, je t'aime, a 1974 album by Johnny Hallyday
  - "Je t'aime, je t'aime, je t'aime" (song), the title song from the above album
- "Je t'aime... moi non plus", a 1967 song written by Serge Gainsbourg for Brigitte Bardot
- Je t'aime moi non plus (film), a 1976 film by Serge Gainsbourg
