= I Loved You (disambiguation) =

"I Loved You" is a 2014 song by Blonde.

I Loved You may also refer to:

== Poetry ==
- I Loved You (poem) (Я вас любил "Ya Vas liubil"; "I Loved You"), poem by Pushkin set by several Russian composers.

== Film ==
- I Loved You (film) 1967
- I Loved You, a trilogy of documentaries by Viktor Kossakovsky

== Music ==
- "I Loved You" (Dargomyzhsky song) (redirects to I Loved You (poem))
- "I Loved You", an 1834 song by Alexander Alyabyev
- "I Loved You", a song by Boris Sheremetev from I Met You, My Love
- "I Loved You", a song for voice and chamber ensemble by the composer Dirk Brossé
- "I Loved You", a 1974 song by Bob and Marcia
- "I Loved You", a song by Sarah Brightman from Who Wants to Live Forever EP
- "I Loved You", a song by Will Smith from Big Willie Style
- "I Loved You", a song by Day6 from Moonrise

== See also ==
- If I Loved You
- Till I Loved You (disambiguation)
- I Love You (disambiguation)
