= Te Amo =

Te Amo may refer to:

- Te Amo (album), a 2008 album by Makano
- Te Amo, an album by María Conchita Alonso
- "Te Amo" (Makano song), 2008
- "Te Amo" (Piso 21 and Paulo Londra song), 2018
- "Te Amo" (Rihanna song), 2010
- "Te Amo", a song by Alexander Acha
- "Te Amo", a song by Ash King from the movie Dum Maaro Dum
- "Te Amo", a song by Atlas Sound, from the album Parallax
- "Te Amo", a song by Franco De Vita from Al Norte del Sur
- "Te Amo", a song by Miyeon from My
- "Te Amo", a song by Neyma
- "Te Amo", a song by Rocío Dúrcal from Si Te Pudiera Mentir
- "Te Amo", a song by the band Stryper
- "Te Amo", the Spanish-language version of "Ti amo" by Umberto Tozzi
- Te amo, a 1986 Argentine film featuring Ricardo Darín
- Te Amo, a 2004 Philippine telenovela
- Te Amo Amaru-Tibble (born 1989), New Zealand netball player
- Te Amo, a brand of cigars produced in the Veracruz municipality of San Andrés Tuxtla
- Te Amo, Spanish title of the 1989 Indian film Maine Pyar Kiya

== See also ==
- Ti Amo (disambiguation)
- I Love You (disambiguation)
