= Ti Amo (disambiguation) =

"Ti amo" is a 1977 song by Umberto Tozzi, later covered by multiple artists.

Ti amo may also refer to:

- Ti Amo (album), a 2017 album by Phoenix
- Ti amo..., a 2006 album by Mina
- "Ti Amo" (Gina G song), a 1997 song by Gina G

== See also ==
- Te Amo (disambiguation)
- I Love You (disambiguation)
