= Prends ma vie =

Single by Johnny Hallyday

from the album Je t'aime, je t'aime, je t'aime
- Language: French
- English title: Take my life
- B-side: "Trop belle trop jolie"
- Released: 18 March 1974
- Recorded: 1973
- Genre: Rock, chanson
- Length: 3:03
- Label: Philips
- Songwriter(s): Michel Mallory, Jean Renard
- Producer(s): Jean Renard

Johnny Hallyday singles chronology
"Noël interdit" (1973)	"Prends ma vie" (1974)	"Je t'aime, je t'aime, je t'aime" (1974)

Music video
- "Prends ma vie" (French TV, 1974) on YouTube

"Prends ma vie" ("Take my life") is a song by French singer Johnny Hallyday. In March 1974 it was released as the lead single off of Hallyday's 1974 studio album Je t'aime, je t'aime, je t'aime.

== Composition and writing ==
The song was written by Michel Mallory and Jean Renard. The recording was produced by Jean Renard. The single is backed by "Trop belle trop jolie" ("Too beautiful, too pretty").

== Commercial performance ==
In France the single spent three weeks at no. 1 on the singles sales chart (in March–April 1974).

== Track listing ==
7" single Philips 6009 478 (1974, France)

Side 1. "Prends ma vie" (3:03)
Side 2. "Trop belle trop jolie" (3:33)

== Charts ==
Chart (1974)	Peak position
France (Singles Sales)	1
