= Till I Loved You =

Till I Loved You may refer to:

- "Till I Loved You" (song), a 1989 song by Plácido Domingo and Jennifer Rush
- Till I Loved You (album), a 1989 album by Barbra Streisand
- "Til I Loved You", a 1986 song by Restless Heart

== See also ==
- I Loved You (disambiguation)
- I Love You (disambiguation)
