= Love You =

Love You may refer to:

== Music ==
- The Beach Boys Love You, a 1977 album by the Beach Boys
- "Love You" (song), a 2006 song by Jack Ingram
- "Love You", a song by Anitta from Versions of Me
- "Love You", a song by The Free Design from ...Sing for Very Important People
- "Love You", a song by Sondre Lerche from Two Way Monologue
- "Love You", a song by Syd Barrett from The Madcap Laughs
- "L.o.v.e U", a 2007 song by Leah Dizon

== Television and film ==
- Love You (TV series), a 2011 Taiwanese drama
- Love You (film), a 1979 pornographic film
- Luv U, a 2012 Philippine teen comedy series

== See also ==
- Love Ya, an album by the Fullerton College Jazz Band
- "Love Ya", a song by Unklejam
- I Love You (disambiguation)
- Love You More (disambiguation)
