= I'll Always Love You =

I'll Always Love You may refer to:

== Music ==
- I'll Always Love You (album), a 1979 album by Anne Murray
- "I'll Always Love You", a 1950 single by Dean Martin
- "I'll Always Love You" (The Spinners song), 1965
- "I'll Always Love You" (Michael Johnson song), 1979
- "I'll Always Love You" (Taylor Dayne song), 1988

== Other uses ==
- I'll Always Love You (1933 film), an Italian film directed by Mario Camerini
- I'll Always Love You (1943 film), an Italian film remake directed by Mario Camerini
- I'll Always Love You, a children's book by Hans Wilhelm

== See also ==
- I Will Always Love You (disambiguation)
- "I'll Always Be In Love With You", a song by Morton Downey popularized by Kay Starr, also covered by Jack Pleis and by the Beatles
