= I Love Me =

I Love Me may refer to:

- I Love Me (film), directed by B. Unnikrishnan

== Songs ==
- "I Love Me" (song), by Demi Lovato
- "I Love Me", by Lil' Mo, from the album P.S. I Love Me
- "I Love Me", by Meghan Trainor, from the album Thank You

== See also ==
- I Love You (disambiguation)
- Narcissus (mythology)
  - Narcissism
