= Johnny Rider =

Single by Johnny Hallyday

from the album Rock 'n' Slow
- Language: French
- B-side: "Le Bol d'Or"
- Released: 18 September 1974
- Recorded: Spring–Summer 1974
- Studio: Studio LSB, Paris; Studio 92, Boulogne-Billancourt
- Genre: Rock
- Length: 3:39
- Label: Philips
- Songwriter(s): Michel Mallory, Sam Bernett, Jean-Marc Deutère
- Producer(s): Jean Renard

Johnny Hallyday singles chronology
"Je t'aime, je t'aime, je t'aime" (1974)	"Johnny Rider" (1974)	"Rock'n'roll man" (1974)

"Johnny Rider" is a song by French singer Johnny Hallyday. It was released as a single in September 1974 and included on his studio album Rock 'n' Slow, released two months later.

== Composition and writing ==
The song was written by Michel Mallory, Sam Bernett, and Jean-Marc Deutère. The recording was produced by Jean Renard. The song was imagined by Mallory and Bernett and set to music by the singer's musical director and keyboardist on stage, Jean-Marc Deuterre, as a Road movie musical and a “Western biker song” with a purely fictional plot, it is however inspired by Hallyday's motorcycle crossing that April on a Kawasaki 900 Z1 (which can be seen on the cover art, manufactured from 1973 to 1976), the Grand Canyon and the Death Valley. The single is backed by "Le Bol d'Or" ("The Golden Bowl").

== Commercial performance ==
In France the single spent one week at no. 1 on the singles sales chart (in October 1974).

== Track listing ==
7" single Philips 6009 545 (1974, France etc.)

A. "Johnny Rider" (3:39)
B. "Le Bol d'Or" (3:00)

== Personnel ==
- Jean-Pierre Azoulay – guitar
- Pat Donaldson – bass
- Tommy Brown – drums
- Jean-Marc Deuterre – organ
- René Morizur – saxophone
- Pierre Goasquen – trombone
- Guy Marco – trumpet

== Charts ==
Chart (1974)	Peak position
France (Singles Sales)	1
