= I Loved You (poem) =

1830 poem written by Alexander Pushkin

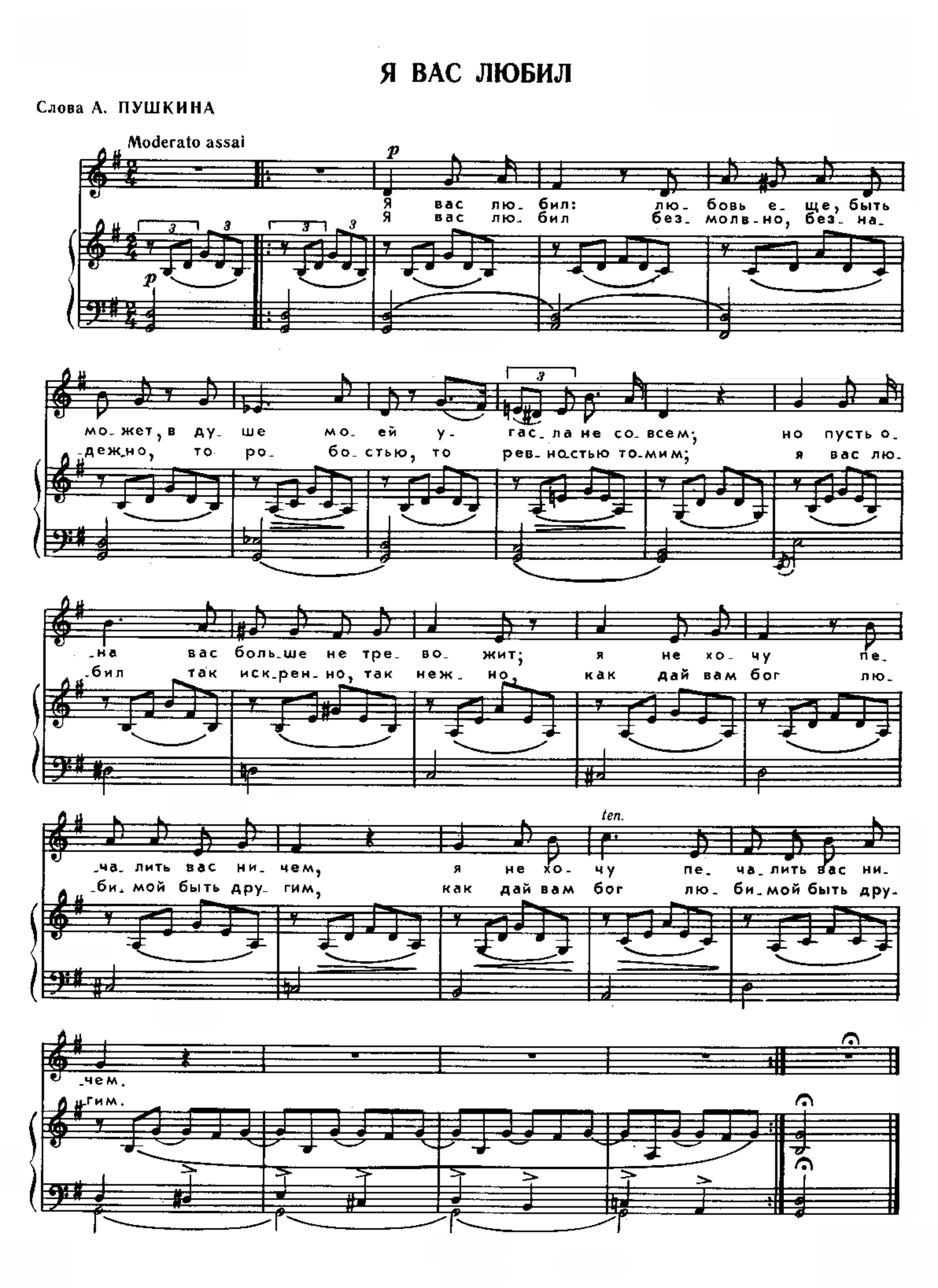
Dargomyzhsky's setting of the poem.

"I Loved You" (Russian: Я вас любил, Ya vas lyubíl) is a poem by Alexander Pushkin written in 1829 and published in 1830. It has been described as "the quintessential statement of the theme of lost love" in Russian poetry, and an example of Pushkin's attitude towards women.

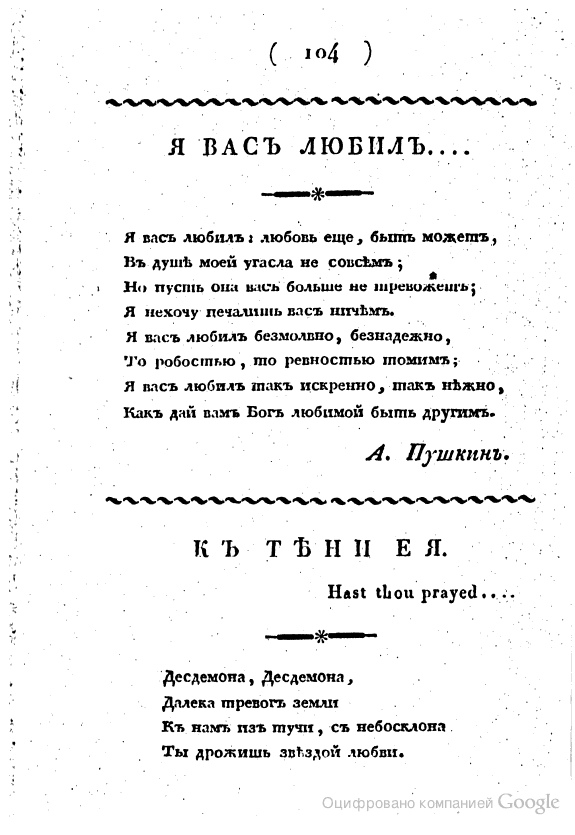
Original version

"Я вас любил: любовь еще, быть может..."
A poem by Alexander Pushkin

== Text ==
=== Russian (Cyrillic) ===
Romanization: (Note: Ya vas lyubíl: lyubóv' eshchyó, byt' mózhet, V dushé moyéy ugásla ne sovsém; No pust' oná vas ból'she ne trevózhit; Ya ne khochú pechálit' vas nichém. Ya vas lyubíl bezmólvno, beznadézhno, To róbost'yu, to révnost'yu tomím; Ya vas lyubíl tak ískrenno, tak nézhno, Kak day vam Bokh lyubímoy byt' drugím.)

Я вас любил: любовь ещё, быть может,
В душе моей угасла не совсем;
Но пусть она вас больше не тревожит;
Я не хочу печалить вас ничем.
Я вас любил безмолвно, безнадежно,
То робостью, то ревностью томим;
Я вас любил так искренно, так нежно,
Как дай вам Бог любимой быть другим.

=== English translation ===
As translated by Reginald Hewitt

I loved you; even now I may confess,
Some embers of my love their fire retain;
But do not let it cause you more distress,
I do not want to sadden you again.
Hopeless and tongue-tied, yet I loved you dearly
With pangs the jealous and the timid know;
So tenderly I loved you, so sincerely,
I pray God grant another love you so.

== Summary of the poem ==
Pushkin expresses his affectionate feelings towards a lady in this poem. The poet is melancholy about his unrequited love, and lets go knowing that the object of his affections can never love him back, so he wishes her to one day possess the kind of love that he has for her.

== Cultural references ==
=== Settings in music ===
- "I Loved You", a song by composer Alexander Dargomyzhsky (1832)
- "I Loved You", a song by composer Alexander Alyabyev (1834)
- "I Loved You", a song by composer Boris Sheremetev (1859)
- "I Loved You," a song by composer and arranger Claus Ogermann (1973)

=== In film ===
The poem has various references in Soviet and Russian film. Most recently in I Loved You, a trilogy of documentaries by Viktor Kossakovsky.
