= Noël interdit =

Single by Johnny Hallyday
- Language: French
- English title: Forbidden Christmas
- B-side: "Fou d'amour"
- Released: 15 November 1973
- Recorded: Fall 1973
- Genre: Rock, chanson, christmas
- Length: 2:49
- Label: Philips
- Songwriter(s): Michel Mallory, Johnny Hallyday
- Producer(s): Jean Renard

Johnny Hallyday singles chronology
"La Feu" (1973)	"Noël interdit" (1973)	"Prends ma vie" (1974)

Music video
- "Noël interdit" (French Swiss TV, 1974) on YouTube

"Noël interdit" (translation: Forbidden Christmas) is a Christmas song by French singer Johnny Hallyday. It was released as a single in November 1973.

== Composition and writing ==
The song was written by Michel Mallory and Johnny Hallyday, and the recording was produced by Jean Renard.

== Commercial performance ==
In France, the single spent one week at No. 1 on the singles sales chart (in December 1973).

== Track listing ==
7" single Philips JF 6009 419 (1973, France)

Side 1. "Noël interdit"
Side 2. "Fou d'amour"

== Charts ==
Chart (1973)	Peak position
France (Singles Sales)	1
