= Makano =

Panamanian singer

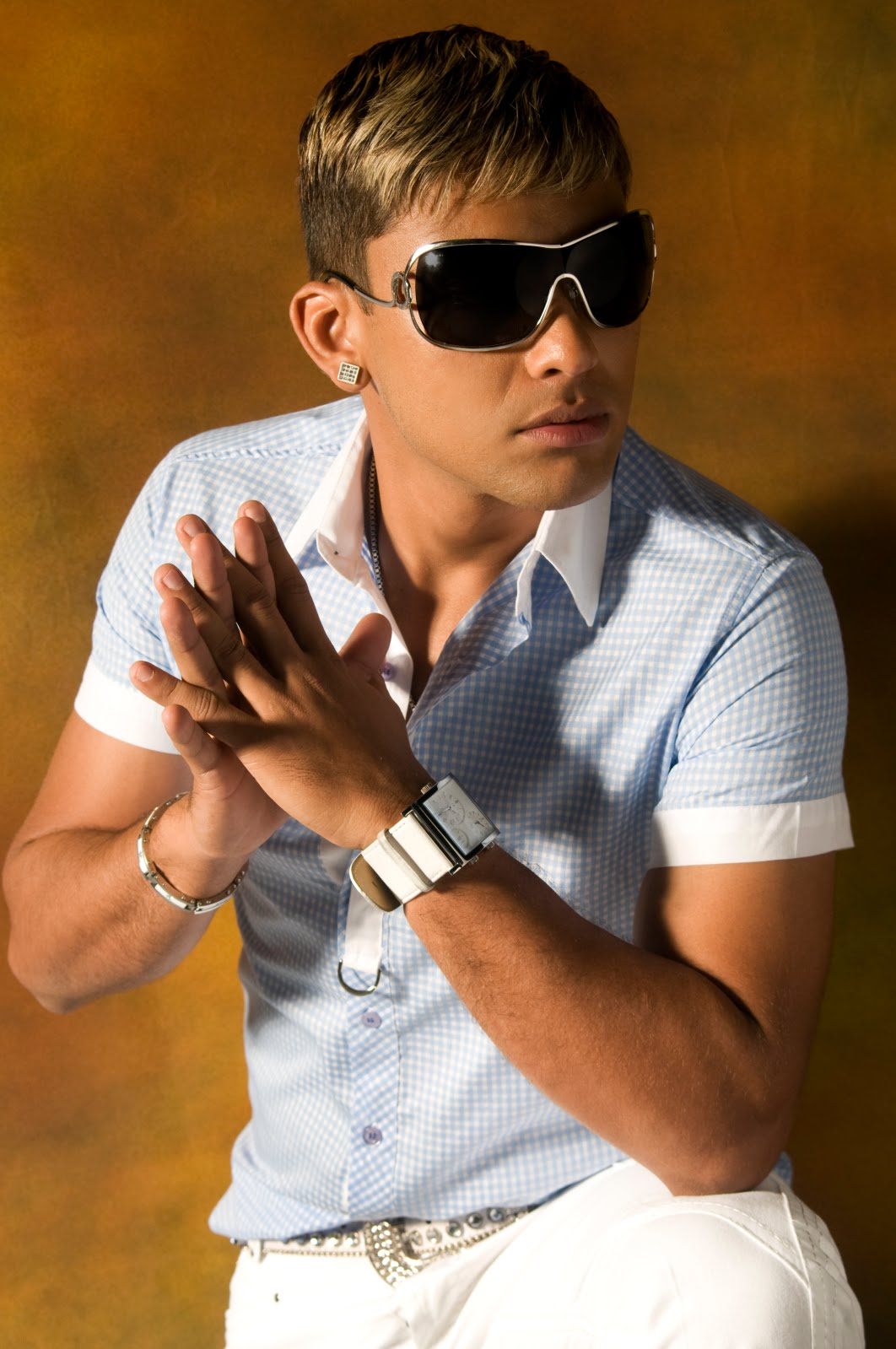

Background information
- Born: Hernán Enrique Jiménez Pino; May 7, 1983 (age 43); Panama City, Panama
- Genres: Reggaeton, Reggae en Español
- Occupation: Singer-songwriter
- Instrument: Vocals
- Years active: 1998–present
- Labels: Universal Music, Machete Music, Panama Music
- Website: makano.net

Hernán Enrique Jiménez Pino (born May 7, 1983), is a Panamanian singer better known by his stage name Makano. At the age of 12, Jiménez was part of a reggaeton group called "Los Makanos". The members of the group made a promise that the first of them to record a full album would carry on the group's name. Makano in Panama and Colombia means "strong like a tree".

When he was 16, Jiménez was writing quality music, but his father discouraged him from music, saying he needed to get a real job. After several years of trying, an opportunity appeared and Jimenez appeared on the CD La Alianza in 2004. Afterward, he was given the chance to record several songs, which later became number one hits in Panama. In 2007, Jimenez signed with Panama Music and recorded his first album as a solo singer: Te Amo Rosemary, which features the songs "Yo Quisiera Vivir", "Te Va a Doler", "Te Amo" and "Déjame Entrar".

In the week of May 23 and May 30, 2009, Te Amo was number 1 on Billboard Hot Latin Songs.

== Awards and nominations ==
- His first album, Te Amo, reached Gold for sales in the United States.
- Reached Platinum for digital download of his album Te Amo in Central America.
- Certification by RIAA for multiple weeks as a Number One Single for "Te Amo" in Billboard Magazine.
- "Best Breakthrough Artist" and "Best Hip Hop Artist" in Premios Texas 2009
- "Revelacion del Año Urbano" in Premios Lo Nuestro 2010
- Nominated for a Premio Billboard en Español as "Artist of the Year, Debut"

== Discography ==
=== Studio albums ===
- 2008: Te Amo
- 2010: Sin fronteras

=== Singles ===
- Atrévete (2004)
- Traición (2004)
- Si Tú No Le Dices (2008)
- Te Amo (2008)
- Déjame Entrar (2009)
- Su Nombre en Mi Cuaderno (feat. Josenid) (2009)
- Como Hago Para Olvidarte (2010)
- Somos Amantes (2010)
- Dejame Volver (2010)
- Por Estar a Tu Lado (2012)
- Tengo Miedo (2013)
- Nunca Me Amaste (2013)
- Eres Culpable (2015)
- Se Acabo (2016)
- Tu Desconfianza (2016)
- Me Rehúso (2016)
