= I Love You Too =

I Love You Too may refer to:

- I Love You Too (2001 film), a Dutch film by Ruud van Hemert
- I Love You Too (2010 film), an Australian film by Daina Reid
- "I Love You Too" (Entourage), an episode of Entourage
- I Love You Too, a 1989 album by Ted Hawkins
- "I Love You Too", a song by Aaradhna from I Love You
- "ILY2", a song by Charli XCX from Number 1 Angel
