= Te Amo (album) =

Studio album by Makano
- Released: November 18, 2008
- Recorded: 2008
- Genre: Reggaeton
- Label: Panama Music; Machete Music

Makano chronology
Te Amo (2008)	Sin Fronteras (2010)

Singles from Te Amo
- 1. "Te Amo" Released: November 1, 2008; 2. "Dejame Entrar" Released: January 15, 2009

Te Amo (I Love You) is the first studio album released by Panamanian singer-songwriter Makano on November 18, 2008. This album includes the single "Te Amo", which peaked at number-one in the Billboard Hot Latin Tracks chart. Te Amo was nominated for a Lo Nuestro Award for Urban Album of the Year.

== Track listing ==
All tracks are written by Eran Jiménez

No.	Title	Length
1.	"Te Amo"	3:47
2.	"Déjame Entrar"	3:43
3.	"Hambriento de Tí"	3:52
4.	"No Quise Hacerte Daño"	3:08
5.	"Te Va Doler"	2:56
6.	"Para Que Vuelvas a Mi Vida"	3:34
7.	"Si Tú No Le Dices"	3:06
8.	"Estoy Amando a Otra"	3:04
9.	"Traición"	2:27
10.	"Yo Quisiera Vivir"	4:08
11.	"Quisiera Creer"	2:46
12.	"Lo Prefieres a Él"	3:07
13.	"Te Quiero"	4:12

== Chart performance ==
Chart (2008)	Peak position
US Billboard Top Latin Albums	29
US Billboard Heatseekers	36

== Certification ==
Region	Certification	Certified units/sales
United States (RIAA)	Gold (Latin)	50,000^{^}
^{^} Shipments figures based on certification alone.
