= Because I Love You =

Because I Love You may refer to:

== Film ==
- Because I Love You (1928 film), a German silent film
- Because I Love You (2017 film), a South Korean film

== Music ==
- Because I Love You (album), by Yoo Jae-ha, or the title song, 1987
- "Because I Love You" (Badfinger song), 1981
- "Because I Love You" (Montaigne song), 2016
- "Because I Love You" (September song), 2008
- "Because I Love You (The Postman Song)", a song by Stevie B, 1990; covered by Groove Coverage, 2007
- "Because I Love You", a song by Billy Stewart, 1965
- "Because I Love You", a song by the Five Stairsteps, 1970
- "Because I Love You", a song by Georgie Fame, 1967
- "Because I Love You", a song by the Masters Apprentices, 1970
- "Because I Love You", a song by Shakin' Stevens from Let's Boogie, 1986

== See also ==
- Because I Loved You, or It's You I Have Loved, a 1929 German film
- Coz I Luv You (album), by Slade, 1972
  - "Coz I Luv You", the title song
- Cuz I Love You, an album by Lizzo, 2019
  - "Cuz I Love You" (song), the title song
