= I Love You (What Can I Say) =

Single by Jerry Reed

from the album Sweet Love Feelings
- Released: May 29, 1978
- Genre: Country
- Length: 3:39
- Label: RCA
- Songwriter: Deena Rose
- Producer: Jerry Reed

Jerry Reed singles chronology
"Sweet Love Feelings" (1978)	"I Love You (What Can I Say)" (1978)	"Gimme Back My Blues" (1978)

"I Love You (What Can I Say)" is a song written by Deena Kaye Rose (Note: Credited as Dick Feller; the song was written and released before Rose came out as transgender.) and recorded by American country music artist Jerry Reed. It was released in May 1978 as the third and final single from his album, Sweet Love Feelings. The song reached a peak of number 10 on the U.S. Billboard Hot Country Singles chart and number 7 on the Canadian RPM Country Tracks chart.

== Chart performance ==
Chart (1978)	Peak position
U.S. Billboard Hot Country Singles	10
Canadian RPM Country Tracks	7
