= Te Amo (Makano song) =

Single by Makano

from the album Te Amo
- Released: September 2008
- Recorded: June 2008
- Genre: Reggaetón Latin Pop
- Length: 3:47
- Label: Panama Music; Machete
- Songwriters: José Nieves (R.K.M), Rafael Pina Nieves, Kenny Vázquez (Ken-Y), Karl Palencia
- Producer: Fasther

Makano singles chronology
"Si Tú No le Dices" (2008)	"Te Amo" (2008)	"Déjame Entrar" (2009)

"Te Amo" ("I Love You") is a song written and performed by Panamanian reggaetón singer-songwriter Makano. It was released as the second single from his first international release of the same title. This single peaked at number-one in the Billboard Hot Latin Tracks chart.

== Song information ==
In late 2006, Panama Music signed Makano to record his first album. The deal became final in May 2007 and in the following month, the singer, along with his record producer and manager reviewed and selected the songs to be included on the album. They agreed that his music style would be romantic, but also wanted to be aggressive with the first single to be released. "Si Tú No Le Dices", produced by DJ Greg, was eventually released and became a hit in Panama. A few weeks later, two singles were released, "Fuera de Mi Vida" and "Te Amo", the latter a romantic song produced by Fasther. Both songs were well accepted by the Panamanian audience.

== Chart performance ==
"Te Amo" debuted at number 46 in the Billboard Hot Latin Songs chart on October 25, 2008. and slowly climbed to its peak at number 11, 20 weeks later. The song spent 25 weeks in the chart. After dropping the chart, the song moved to recurrent status, until two new remixes send the song soaring back in all the way to number one, becoming the second Panamanian to peak at number-one in the Hot Latin Tracks, after Flex's "Te Quiero". The song has been dominating radio airplay throughout Latin America, and also has become one of the most downloaded digital tracks and mobile ringtones in the US. The remixed versions of the single, the 'Reggaetón Remix' featuring R.K.M & Ken-Y, and the 'Regional Mexican version' with Germán Montero, have contributed to the chart-topping radio success of the single. "Te Amo" was certified gold for 125,000 digital downloads sold. The single was a massive success in Argentina in 2008 and later chosen as the Coca-Cola's Summer Song of 2010 in this country.

== Remixes ==
1. "Te Amo"
2. "Te Amo" Featuring MJ (Part 1)
3. "Te Amo" Featuring R.K.M & Ken-Y (Part 2)
4. "Te Amo" Featuring R.K.M & Ken-Y and MJ (Part 3)
5. "Te Amo" (Duranguense Version)

== Charts ==
Chart (2008)	Peak position
U.S. Billboard Hot Latin Songs	1
U.S. Billboard Latin Rhythm Airplay	2
U.S. Billboard Latin Tropical Airplay	1
