= I Will Always Love You (disambiguation) =

"I Will Always Love You" is a song written by Dolly Parton and covered by Whitney Houston.

I Will Always Love You or I'll Always Love You may also refer to:

== Music ==
- I Will Always Love You and Other Greatest Hits, an album by Dolly Parton
- I Will Always Love You: The Best of Whitney Houston, an album by Whitney Houston
- "I Will Always Love You" (Troop song), 1990
- "I Will Always Love You" (Whitney Houston recording), 1992
- "I Will Always Love You", a song by Kenny Rogers from Eyes That See in the Dark
- "I'll Always Love You", a song by Michael Johnson

== Other media ==
- I Will Always Love You (film), a Filipino movie starring Richard Gutierrez and Angel Locsin
- I Will Always Love You, a Gossip Girl novel by Cecily von Ziegesar

== See also ==
- I'll Always Love You (disambiguation)
- "Lovesong" (The Cure song)
- Inday Will Always Love You, a 2018 Philippine television drama
- We Will Always Love You, a 2020 album by the Avalanches
