= Love You More =

Love You More may refer to:

== Film and television ==
- Love You More (film), a 2008 British short film
- Love You More, a 2017 Amazon Video pilot that did not get picked up

== Literature ==
- Love You More, a 2011 suspense novel by Lisa Gardner
- Love You More, a 2026 novel by Emily Giffin

== Music ==
- Love You More (album), a 2011 album by Sanchez
- Love You More (EP), a 2010 EP by The Pierces
- "Love You More" (Buzzcocks song), 1978
- "Love You More" (Ginuwine song), 2003
- "Love You More" (JLS song), 2010
- "Love You More", a 2004 song by Eminem from Encore
- "Love You More", a 2016 song by Olly Murs from 24 Hrs
- "Love You More", a 2020 song by Steve Aoki featuring Lay Zhang and Will.i.am
- "Love You More", a 2021 song by Young Thug from Punk
- "Love U More", a 1992 song by Sunscreem
  - Covered as "Love You More" by Basshunter on Now You're Gone – The Album, 2008

== See also ==
- "Loving You More", a 1995 song by BT
- Loving You More... In The Spirit Of Etta James, a 2012 album by Leela James
