= Je t'aime, je t'aime, je t'aime (song) =

Single by Johnny Hallyday

from the album Je t'aime, je t'aime, je t'aime
- Language: French
- English title: I love you, I love you, I love you
- B-side: "Danger d'amour"
- Released: 14 May 1974
- Genre: Rock, chanson
- Length: 6:50 (album version); 4:24 (single version)
- Label: Philips
- Songwriter(s): Michel Mallory, Jean Renard
- Producer(s): Jean Renard

Johnny Hallyday singles chronology
"Prends ma vie" (1974)	"Je t'aime, je t'aime, je t'aime" (1974)	"Johnny Rider" (1974)

Music video
- "Je t'aime, je t'aime, je t'aime" (album version) (French TV, 1974) on YouTube

"Je t'aime, je t'aime, je t'aime" ("I love you, I love you, I love you") is a song by French singer Johnny Hallyday from his 1974 studio album Je t'aime, je t'aime, je t'aime. It was also released as the self-titled, second, and final single from the album.

== Composition and writing ==
The song was written by Michel Mallory and Jean Renard. The recording was produced by Jean Renard. The single is backed by "Danger d'amour" ("danger of love").

== Commercial performance ==
In France the single spent two weeks at no. 1 on the singles sales chart (in June–July 1974).

== Track listing ==
7" single Philips 6009 510 (1974, France etc.)

A. "Je t'aime, je t'aime, je t'aime" (4:24)
B. "Danger d'amour" (3:40)

== Charts ==
Chart (1974)	Peak position
France (Singles Sales)	1
