= Boris Sheremetev (composer) =

Russian composer

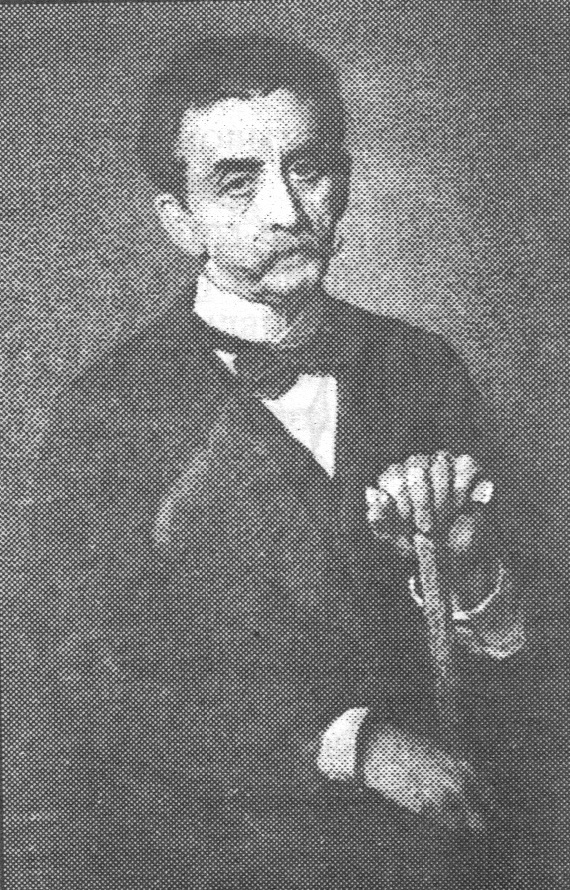
- Boris Sheremetev
- Born: 1822
- Died: 1906 (aged 83–84)
- Era: Romantic

Boris Sergeevich Sheremetev (Борис Сергеевич Шереметев; 1822–1906) was a Russian composer. His best known work today is the setting of Pushkin's poem "I Loved You", which has been recorded by artists including Dmitri Hvorostovsky.

== Works ==
- "I Loved You" ("Я Вас любил") on words by Pushkin
