= Declaration of love =

Expressing love for someone or something

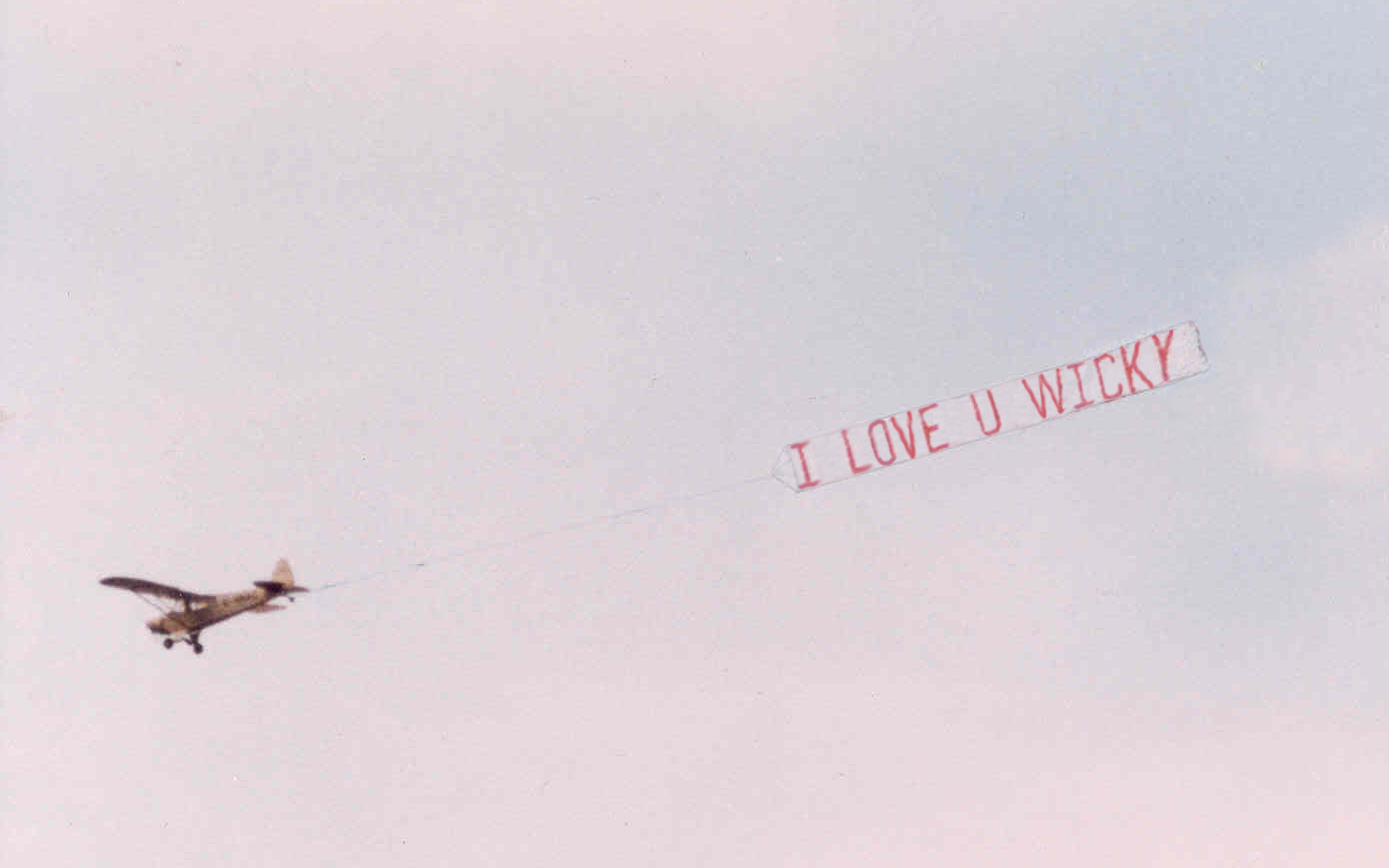
Aerial declaration of love to Wicky

A declaration of love, also known as a confession of love, is a form of expressing one's love for someone or something. It can be presented in various forms, such as love letters, speeches, or love songs. A love declaration is more often than not explicit and straightforward.

A declaration of love from one person to another is "a statement made by one person to another in which they say they are in love with the other person."

== Examples in art and literature ==
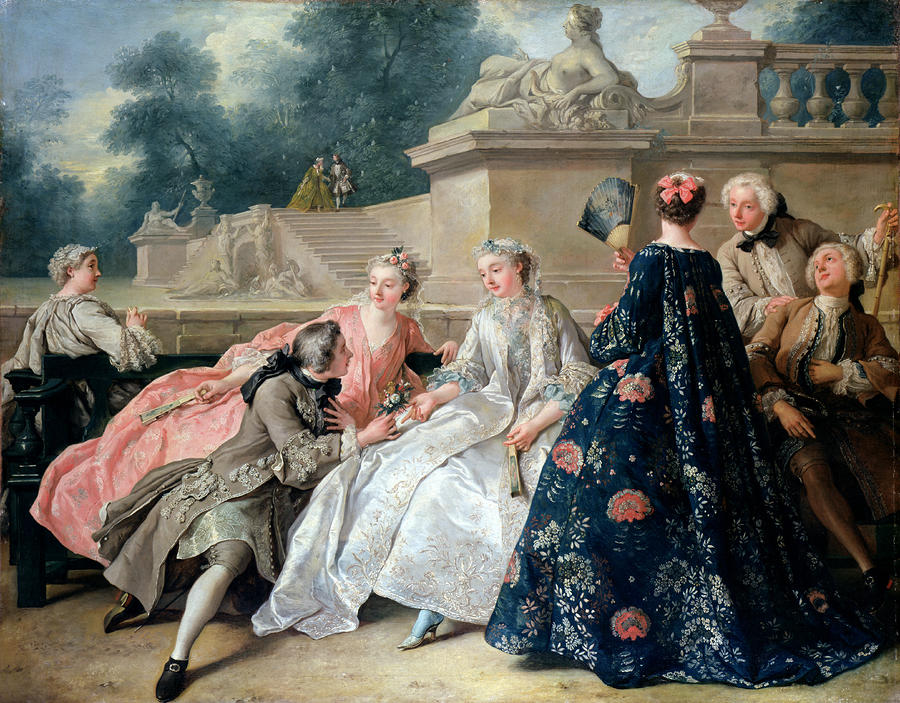
The Declaration of Love by Jean François de Troy

One widely referenced declaration of love comes from Shakespeare's Romeo and Juliet. In the balcony scene, Juliet declares her love for Romeo who stands outside her window:

My bounty is as boundless as the sea,
My love as deep; the more I give to thee,
The more I have, for both are infinite.

Romeo subsequently declares his love for Juliet to her, making it a declaration of mutual consent—an accepted love declaration—where both partners are in love.

An example of a less-successful declaration of love can be found in Jane Austen's Pride and Prejudice where Darcy declares his love for Elisabeth: "In vain have I struggled. It will not do. My feelings will not be repressed. You must allow me to tell you how ardently I admire and love you."

As it is a confession as well as a declaration, it comes as quite a shock to Elisabeth, who does not return Darcy's confession of love. However, she says she feels "a sense of obligation for the sentiments avowed, however unequally they may be returned." She adds that she has "never desired [his] good opinion" and that he has "certainly bestowed it most unwillingly," making it clear that his declaration is unwanted as well as unsuccessful.

== Historical occurrences ==
In the oldest existing text written in Icelandic, a faded and near illegible runic inscription from the 10th or 11th century, the word “ást” appears, which directly translates as love. It is speculated the author of the text was declaring their love for something.

== Non-verbal declarations ==
=== Love letters ===
A love letter is one of the most classical forms of non-verbal declarations of feelings of love. It allows for more specificity and a clearer point as the author of a love letter has time to think, rephrase, and edit the contents of their thoughts.

=== Permanent marks ===
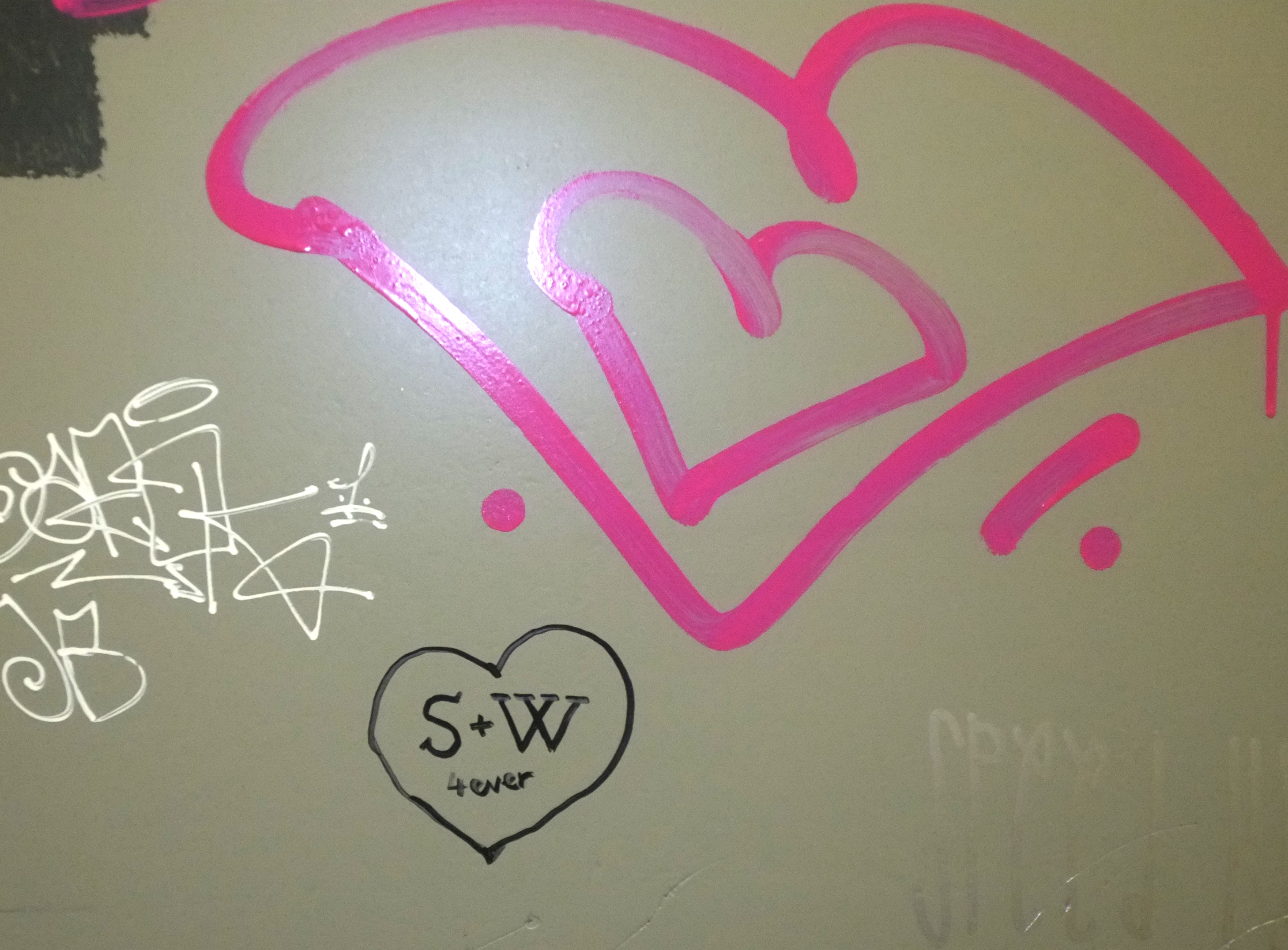
Lovers' graffiti on the door of a night club toilet stall in New York City, United States

Declarations of love can surface as permanent marks on urban environments and nature. They are considered vandalism by many municipalities and governments. When a declaration of love is made, it is often attempted to be made permanent. If the declaration is permanent it is considered everlasting or eternal.

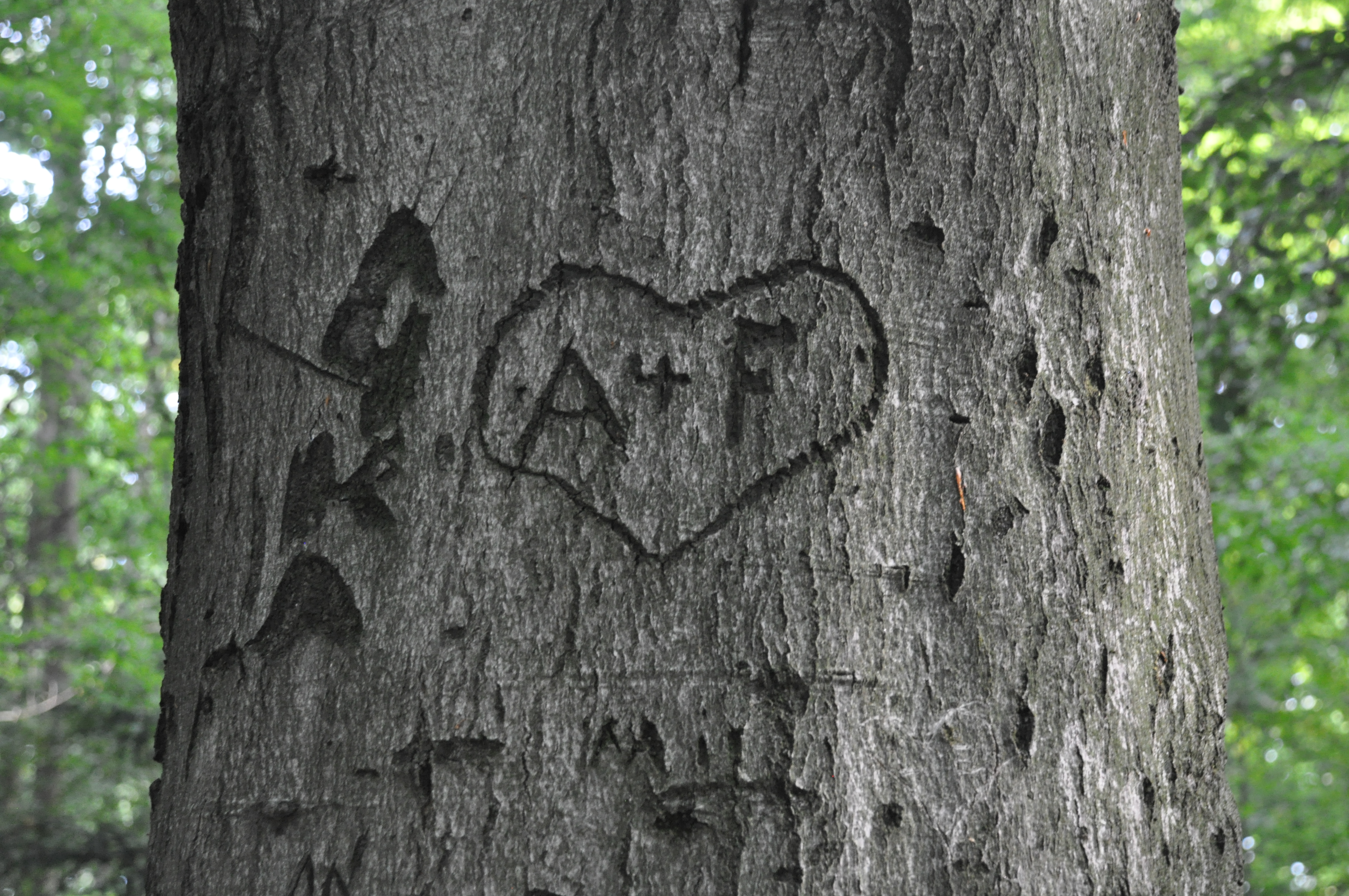
Lovers' carving on a tree in Schlosspark Machern, Germany

A classic example of this are lovers’ arborglyphs, carvings in living trees. A popular romantic image, they are known to spread disease between Beech trees.

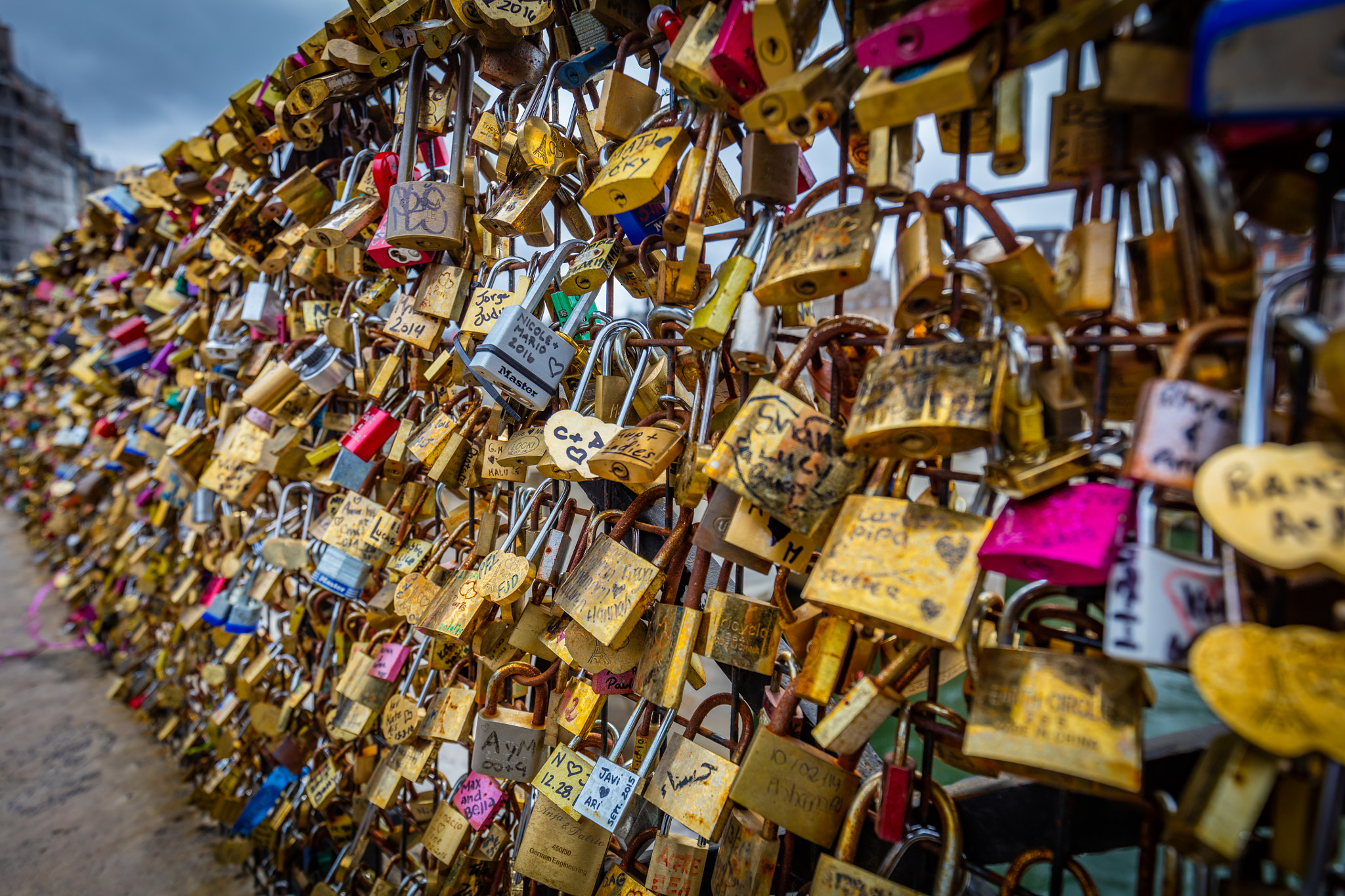
Love padlocks on a bridge in Paris

A more recent example of is the love lock, padlocks which are attached to landmarks and other constructions with the names of lovers engraved or written on them. They began appearing on the Pont des Arts bridge in Paris as early as 2008 and have since then become a widespread phenomenon. Now considered vandalism in many places around the world, they are regularly removed. An open petition has been made for them to be banned in Paris.
