= Je t'aime, je t'aime, je t'aime =

Studio album by Johnny Hallyday
- Released: May 29, 1974
- Label: Philips
- Producer: Jean Renard

Johnny Hallyday chronology
Live Olympia 1973 (1973)	Je t'aime, je t'aime, je t'aime (1974)	Rock'n'Slows (1974)

Singles from Chez moi
- 1. "Prends ma vie", c/w "Trop belle trop jolie" Released: March 18, 1974; 2. "Je t'aime, je t'aime, je t'aime", c/w "Danger d'amour" Released: May 14, 1974

Je t'aime, je t'aime, je t'aime is the 17th studio album by French singer Johnny Hallyday, released in 1974 on Philips Records.

== Commercial performance ==
The album spent several weeks at number one in France (according to the data compiled by Centre d'information et de documentation du disque).

== Track listing ==
No.	Title	Writer(s)	Length
1.	"Je t'aime, je t'aime, je t'aime"	Michel Mallory – Jean Renard	6:50
2.	"Mon amour perdu"	Michel Mallory	2:54
3.	"Hey Louisa"	Michel Mallory – Gary Wright	2:47
4.	"J'ai pleuré sur ma guitare (Loving Arms)"	Tom Jans – adaptation by Michel Mallory	3:01
5.	"Danger d'amour"	Michel Mallory – Johnny Hallyday	2:39
6.	"Prends ma vie"	Michel Mallory – Jean Renard	3:07
7.	"Je construis des murs autour de mes rêves"	Michel Mallory – Johnny Hallyday	3:02
8.	"Chanson pour Lily"	Michel Mallory	3:15
9.	"Trop belle, trop jolie"	Michel Mallory – Johnny Hallyday	3:39
10.	"Le Rock'n'Roll"	Michel Mallory	3:36
